= 2020 Washington House of Representatives election =

Washington House of Representatives elections, 2020
- November 3, 2020

All 98 seats in the Washington House of Representatives 50 seats needed for a majority
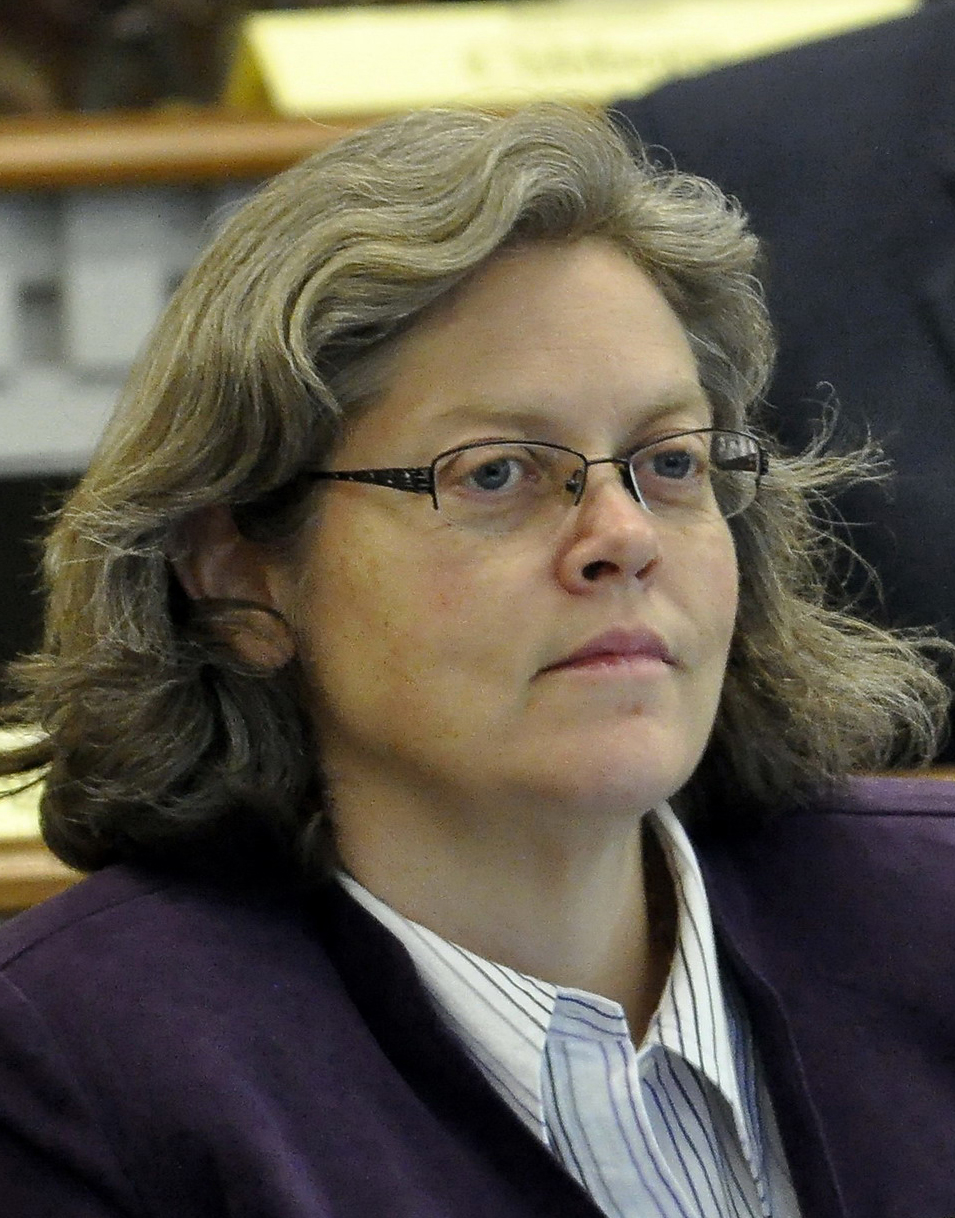

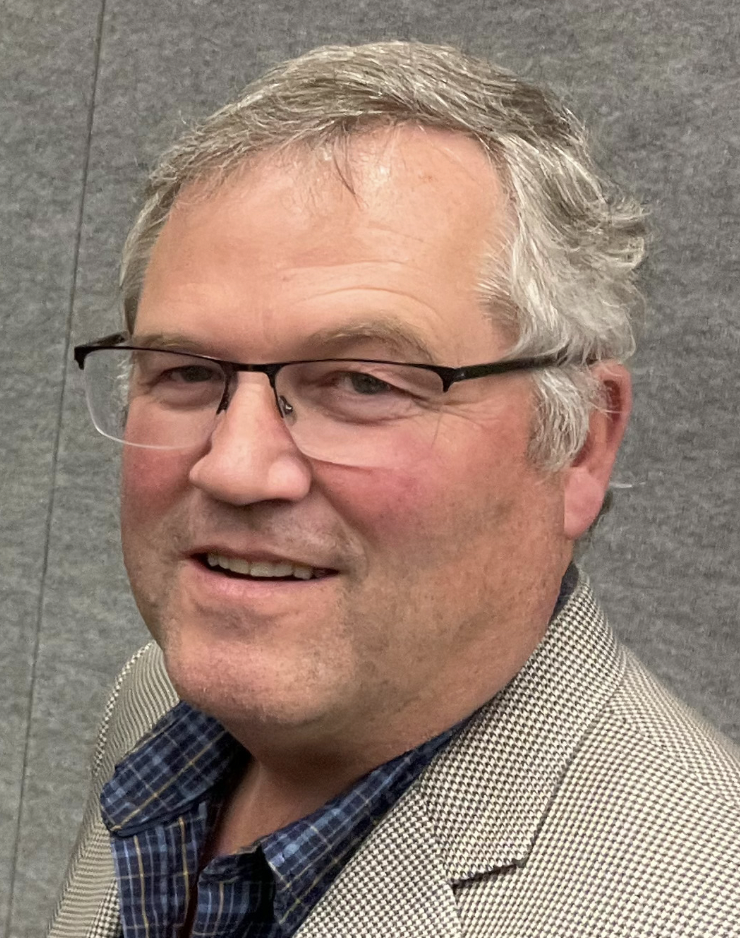
	Majority party	Minority party
Leader	Laurie Jinkins	J. T. Wilcox
Party	Democratic	Republican
Leader's seat	27th-Tacoma	2nd-Roy
Last election	57	41
Seats won	57	41
Seat change	Steady	Steady
Popular vote	4,192,370	3,138,925
Percentage	56.05%	41.96%
Swing	▼3.22%	▲3.92%
- Results: Democratic gain Republican gain Democratic hold Republican hold
Speaker of the House before election
Laurie Jinkins
Democratic
Elected Speaker of the House
Laurie Jinkins
Democratic

The 2020 Washington House of Representatives elections took place as part of the biennial United States elections on November 3, 2020. Washington state voters elected state representatives in all 98 seats of the House, electing two state representatives in each of the 49 Washington state legislative districts. State representatives serve two-year terms in the Washington House of Representatives.

Following the previous election in 2018, Democrats held a 57-to-41-seat majority over Republicans.

Democrats retained control of the Washington House of Representatives following the 2020 general election, with the balance of power remaining unchanged at 57 (D) to 41 (R).

Only one district, the 10th, elected its two representatives from different parties.

== Predictions ==
Source	Ranking	As of
The Cook Political Report	Safe D	October 21, 2020

== Overview ==
Washington State House elections, 2020 Primary election — August 4, 2020
Party	Votes	Percentage	Candidates	Advancing to general	Seats contesting
Democratic	2,518,292	54.49%	122	95	
Republican	1,974,470	42.72%	101	82	
Independent	60,523	1.31%	15	3	
Libertarian	31,688	0.69%	5	3	
Seattle People's	19,637	0.42%	1	1	
Alliance	7,479	0.16%	1	1	
Unity	3,361	0.07%	1	0	
Progressive	3,210	0.07%	2	0	
Socialist	3,000	0.06%	1	0	
Totals	4,621,660	100.00%	249	185	—

Washington State House elections, 2020 General election — November 3, 2020
Party	Votes	Percentage	Seats	+/–
Democratic	4,192,370	56.05%	57	Steady
Republican	3,138,925	41.96%	41	Steady
Libertarian	52,024	0.70%	0	Steady
Independent	50,147	0.67%	0	Steady
Seattle People's	31,029	0.41%	0	Steady
Alliance	15,452	0.21%	0	Steady
Totals	7,479,947	100.0%	98	—

== Summary of results by House district ==
The election resulted in Democratic Party members winning 57 seats and Republican Party members winning 41 seats, with no net change since the last election. Representatives Brian Blake (D) and Luanne Van Werven (R) lost reelection.

House district	Position	Incumbent	Party	Elected Representative	Party
1st	1	Davina Duerr	Dem	Davina Duerr	Dem
1st	2	Shelley Kloba	Dem	Shelley Kloba	Dem
2nd	1	Andrew Barkis	Rep	Andrew Barkis	Rep
2nd	2	J.T. Wilcox	Rep	J.T. Wilcox	Rep
3rd	1	Marcus Riccelli	Dem	Marcus Riccelli	Dem
3rd	2	Timm Ormsby	Dem	Timm Ormsby	Dem
4th	1	Matt Shea	Rep	Bob McCaslin Jr.	Rep
4th	2	Bob McCaslin Jr.	Rep	Rob Chase	Rep
5th	1	Bill Ramos	Dem	Bill Ramos	Dem
5th	2	Lisa Callan	Dem	Lisa Callan	Dem
6th	1	Mike Volz	Rep	Mike Volz	Rep
6th	2	Jenny Graham	Rep	Jenny Graham	Rep
7th	1	Jacquelin Maycumber	Rep	Jacquelin Maycumber	Rep
7th	2	Joel Kretz	Rep	Joel Kretz	Rep
8th	1	Brad Klippert	Rep	Brad Klippert	Rep
8th	2	Matt Boehnke	Rep	Matt Boehnke	Rep
9th	1	Mary Dye	Rep	Mary Dye	Rep
9th	2	Joe Schmick	Rep	Joe Schmick	Rep
10th	1	Norma Smith	Rep	Greg Gilday	Rep
10th	2	Dave Paul	Dem	Dave Paul	Dem
11th	1	Zack Hudgins	Dem	David Hackney	Dem
11th	2	Steve Bergquist	Dem	Steve Bergquist	Dem
12th	1	Keith Goehner	Rep	Keith Goehner	Rep
12th	2	Mike Steele	Rep	Mike Steele	Rep
13th	1	Tom Dent	Rep	Tom Dent	Rep
13th	2	Alex Ybarra	Rep	Alex Ybarra	Rep
14th	1	Chris Corry	Rep	Chris Corry	Rep
14th	2	Gina Mosbrucker	Rep	Gina Mosbrucker	Rep
15th	1	Bruce Chandler	Rep	Bruce Chandler	Rep
15th	2	Jeremie Dufault	Rep	Jeremie Dufault	Rep
16th	1	Bill Jenkin	Rep	Mark Klicker	Rep
16th	2	Skyler Rude	Rep	Skyler Rude	Rep
17th	1	Vicki Kraft	Rep	Vicki Kraft	Rep
17th	2	Paul Harris	Rep	Paul Harris	Rep
18th	1	Brandon Vick	Rep	Brandon Vick	Rep
18th	2	Larry Hoff	Rep	Larry Hoff	Rep
19th	1	Jim Walsh	Rep	Jim Walsh	Rep
19th	2	Brian Blake	Dem	Joel McEntire	Rep
20th	1	Richard DeBolt	Rep	Peter Abbarno	Rep
20th	2	Ed Orcutt	Rep	Ed Orcutt	Rep
21st	1	Strom Peterson	Dem	Strom Peterson	Dem
21st	2	Lillian Ortiz-Self	Dem	Lillian Ortiz-Self	Dem
22nd	1	Laurie Dolan	Dem	Laurie Dolan	Dem
22nd	2	Beth Doglio	Dem	Jessica Bateman	Dem
23rd	1	Sherry Appleton	Dem	Tarra Simmons	Dem
23rd	2	Drew Hansen	Dem	Drew Hansen	Dem
24th	1	Mike Chapman	Dem	Mike Chapman	Dem
24th	2	Steve Tharinger	Dem	Steve Tharinger	Dem
25th	1	Kelly Chambers	Rep	Kelly Chambers	Rep
25th	2	Chris Gildon	Rep	Cyndy Jacobsen	Rep
26th	1	Jesse Young	Rep	Jesse Young	Rep
26th	2	Michelle Caldier	Rep	Michelle Caldier	Rep
27th	1	Laurie Jinkins	Dem	Laurie Jinkins	Dem
27th	2	Jake Fey	Dem	Jake Fey	Dem
28th	1	Mari Leavitt	Dem	Mari Leavitt	Dem
28th	2	Christine Kilduff	Dem	Dan Bronoske	Dem
29th	1	Melanie Morgan	Dem	Melanie Morgan	Dem
29th	2	Steve Kirby	Dem	Steve Kirby	Dem
30th	1	Mike Pellicciotti	Dem	Jamila Taylor	Dem
30th	2	Jesse Johnson	Dem	Jesse Johnson	Dem
31st	1	Drew Stokesbary	Rep	Drew Stokesbary	Rep
31st	2	Morgan Irwin	Rep	Eric E. Robertson	Rep
32nd	1	Cindy Ryu	Dem	Cindy Ryu	Dem
32nd	2	Lauren Davis	Dem	Lauren Davis	Dem
33rd	1	Tina Orwall	Dem	Tina Orwall	Dem
33rd	2	Mia Gregerson	Dem	Mia Gregerson	Dem
34th	1	Eileen Cody	Dem	Eileen Cody	Dem
34th	2	Joe Fitzgibbon	Dem	Joe Fitzgibbon	Dem
35th	1	Dan Griffey	Rep	Dan Griffey	Rep
35th	2	Drew C. MacEwen	Rep	Drew C. MacEwen	Rep
36th	1	Noel Frame	Dem	Noel Frame	Dem
36th	2	Gael Tarleton	Dem	Liz Berry	Dem
37th	1	Sharon Tomiko Santos	Dem	Sharon Tomiko Santos	Dem
37th	2	Eric Pettigrew	Dem	Kirsten Harris-Talley	Dem
38th	1	June Robinson	Dem	Emily Wicks	Dem
38th	2	Mike Sells	Dem	Mike Sells	Dem
39th	1	Robert Sutherland	Rep	Robert Sutherland	Rep
39th	2	Carolyn Eslick	Rep	Carolyn Eslick	Rep
40th	1	Debra Lekanoff	Dem	Debra Lekanoff	Dem
40th	2	Alex Ramel	Dem	Alex Ramel	Dem
41st	1	Tana Senn	Dem	Tana Senn	Dem
41st	2	My-Linh Thai	Dem	My-Linh Thai	Dem
42nd	1	Luanne Van Werven	Rep	Alicia Rule	Dem
42nd	2	Sharon Shewmake	Dem	Sharon Shewmake	Dem
43rd	1	Nicole Macri	Dem	Nicole Macri	Dem
43rd	2	Frank Chopp	Dem	Frank Chopp	Dem
44th	1	John Lovick	Dem	John Lovick	Dem
44th	2	Jared Mead	Dem	April Berg	Dem
45th	1	Roger Goodman	Dem	Roger Goodman	Dem
45th	2	Larry Springer	Dem	Larry Springer	Dem
46th	1	Gerry Pollet	Dem	Gerry Pollet	Dem
46th	2	Javier Valdez	Dem	Javier Valdez	Dem
47th	1	Debra Entenman	Dem	Debra Entenman	Dem
47th	2	Pat Sullivan	Dem	Pat Sullivan	Dem
48th	1	Vandana Slatter	Dem	Vandana Slatter	Dem
48th	2	Amy Walen	Dem	Amy Walen	Dem
49th	1	Sharon Wylie	Dem	Sharon Wylie	Dem
49th	2	Monica Jurado Stonier	Dem	Monica Jurado Stonier	Dem

== Detailed Results by House District ==
- Note: Washington uses a top two primary system. Official primary results can be obtained here and official general election results here.

=== District 1 ===
1st House District Position 1 election, 2020
Primary election
Party	Candidate	Votes	%
Democratic	Davina Duerr (incumbent)	36,117	66.7
Republican	Adam Bartholomew	17,997	33.3
Total votes		54,114	100.0
General election
Democratic	Davina Duerr (incumbent)	58,019	66.5
Republican	Adam Bartholomew	29,256	33.5
Total votes		87,275	100.0
Democratic hold			

1st House District Position 2 election, 2020
Primary election
Party	Candidate	Votes	%
Democratic	Shelley Kloba (incumbent)	33,740	62.5
Republican	Jeb Brewer	13,521	25.1
Republican	Gary Morgan	6,685	12.4
Total votes		53,946	100.0
General election
Democratic	Shelley Kloba (incumbent)	55,622	63.7
Republican	Jeb Brewer	31,696	36.3
Total votes		87,318	100.0
Democratic hold			

=== District 2 ===
2nd House District Position 1 election, 2020
Primary election
Party	Candidate	Votes	%
Republican	Andrew Barkis (incumbent)	35,984	100.0
Total votes		35,984	100.0
General election
Republican	Andrew Barkis (incumbent)	65,621	100.0
Total votes		65,621	100.0
Republican hold			

2nd House District Position 2 election, 2020
Primary election
Party	Candidate	Votes	%
Republican	JT Wilcox (incumbent)	21,387	44.6
Democratic	Veronica Whitcher Rockett	14,642	30.5
Republican	Matt Marshall	11,945	24.9
Total votes		47,974	100.0
General election
Republican	JT Wilcox (incumbent)	53,552	65.7
Democratic	Veronica Whitcher Rockett	27,952	34.3
Total votes		81,504	100.0
Republican hold			

=== District 3 ===
3rd House District Position 1 election, 2020
Primary election
Party	Candidate	Votes	%
Democratic	Marcus Riccelli (incumbent)	21,707	59.8
Republican	Laura D. Carder	14,610	40.2
Total votes		36,317	100.0
General election
Democratic	Marcus Riccelli (incumbent)	40,124	60.6
Republican	Laura D. Carder	26,113	39.4
Total votes		66,237	100.0
Democratic hold			

3rd House District Position 2 election, 2020
Primary election
Party	Candidate	Votes	%
Democratic	Timm Ormsby (incumbent)	22,263	61.6
Republican	Bob Apple (Note: Listed on ballot as "Prefers R Party.")	13,851	38.4
Total votes		36,114	100.0
General election
Democratic	Timm Ormsby (incumbent)	41,298	62.8
Republican	Bob Apple	24,467	37.2
Total votes		65,765	100.0
Democratic hold			

=== District 4 ===
4th House District Position 1 election, 2020
Primary election
Party	Candidate	Votes	%
Republican	Bob McCaslin (pos. 2 incumbent)	20,120	38.8
Democratic	Lori Feagan	18,668	36.1
Republican	Mike Conrad	8,705	16.8
Republican	Dave Whitehead	4,316	8.3
Total votes		51,809	100.0
General election
Republican	Bob McCaslin (pos 2. incumbent)	54,119	60.4
Democratic	Lori Feagan	35,486	39.6
Total votes		89,605	100.0
Republican hold			

4th House District Position 2 election, 2020
Primary election
Party	Candidate	Votes	%
Democratic	Lance Gurel	17,503	34.5
Republican	Rob Chase	16,920	33.3
Republican	Leonard Christian	13,531	26.6
Republican	Nathan R. Sybrandy	2,851	5.6
Total votes		50,805	100.0
General election
Republican	Rob Chase	55,124	62.2
Democratic	Lance Gurel	33,554	37.8
Total votes		88,678	100.0
Republican hold			

=== District 5 ===
5th House District Position 1 election, 2020
Primary election
Party	Candidate	Votes	%
Democratic	Bill Ramos (incumbent)	33,297	59.2
Republican	Ken Moninski	19,601	34.8
Unity	Cyrus Krohn (Note: Listed on ballot as "Prefers Unity Restoration Party.")	3,361	6.0
Total votes		56,259	100.0
General election
Democratic	Bill Ramos (incumbent)	55,109	60.8
Republican	Ken Moninski	35,531	39.2
Total votes		90,640	100.0
Democratic hold			

5th House District Position 2 election, 2020
Primary election
Party	Candidate	Votes	%
Democratic	Lisa Callan (incumbent)	38,801	100.0
Total votes		38,801	100.0
General election
Democratic	Lisa Callan (incumbent)	64,086	100.0
Total votes		64,086	100.0
Democratic hold			

=== District 6 ===
6th House District Position 1 election, 2020
Primary election
Party	Candidate	Votes	%
Republican	Mike Volz (incumbent)	27,620	55.0
Democratic	Zack Zappone	22,598	45.0
Total votes		50,218	100.0
General election
Republican	Mike Volz (incumbent)	44,537	52.0
Democratic	Zack Zappone	41,153	48.0
Total votes		85,690	100.0
Republican hold			

6th House District Position 2 election, 2020
Primary election
Party	Candidate	Votes	%
Republican	Jenny Graham (incumbent)	27,341	54.9
Democratic	Tom McGarry	14,624	29.4
Democratic	Christian M. McLachlan	7,806	15.7
Total votes		49,771	100.0
General election
Republican	Jenny Graham (incumbent)	46,158	54.3
Democratic	Tom McGarry	38,803	45.7
Total votes		84,961	100.0
Republican hold			

=== District 7 ===
7th House District Position 1 election, 2020
Primary election
Party	Candidate	Votes	%
Republican	Jacquelin Maycumber (incumbent)	40,356	72.7
Democratic	Georgia D. Davenport	15,169	27.3
Total votes		55,525	100.0
General election
Republican	Jacquelin Maycumber (incumbent)	61,485	71.9
Democratic	Georgia D. Davenport	23,973	28.1
Total votes		85,458	100.0
Republican hold			

7th House District Position 2 election, 2020
Primary election
Party	Candidate	Votes	%
Republican	Joel Kretz (incumbent)	41,264	77.0
Independent	JJ Wandler (Note: Listed on ballot as "Prefers Independent Party.")	12,339	23.0
Total votes		53,603	100.0
General election
Republican	Joel Kretz (incumbent)	62,615	75.1
Independent	JJ Wandler	20,735	24.9
Total votes		83,350	100.0
Republican hold			

=== District 8 ===
8th House District Position 1 election, 2020
Primary election
Party	Candidate	Votes	%
Republican	Brad Klippert (incumbent)	32,491	67.2
Democratic	Shir Regev	15,866	32.8
Total votes		48,357	100.0
General election
Republican	Brad Klippert (incumbent)	51,981	65.8
Democratic	Shir Regev	26,979	34.2
Total votes		78,960	100.0
Republican hold			

8th House District Position 2 election, 2020
Primary election
Party	Candidate	Votes	%
Republican	Matt Boehnke (incumbent)	36,388	83.0
Alliance	Larry Stanley (Note: Listed on ballot as "Prefers The Alliance Party.")	7,479	17.0
Total votes		43,867	100.0
General election
Republican	Matt Boehnke (incumbent)	59,046	79.3
Alliance	Larry Stanley	15,452	20.7
Total votes		74,498	100.0
Republican hold			

=== District 9 ===
9th House District Position 1 election, 2020
Primary election
Party	Candidate	Votes	%
Republican	Mary Dye (incumbent)	29,082	78.7
Libertarian	Brett Borden	7,889	21.3
Total votes		36,971	100.0
General election
Republican	Mary Dye (incumbent)	48,408	75.1
Libertarian	Brett Borden	16,091	24.9
Total votes		64,499	100.0
Republican hold			

9th House District Position 2 election, 2020
Primary election
Party	Candidate	Votes	%
Republican	Joe Schmick (incumbent)	29,808	100.0
Total votes		29,808	100.0
General election
Republican	Joe Schmick (incumbent)	53,707	100.0
Total votes		53,707	100.0
Republican hold			

=== District 10 ===
10th House District Position 1 election, 2020
Primary election
Party	Candidate	Votes	%
Republican	Greg Gilday	28,368	46.4
Democratic	Angie Homola	16,004	26.2
Democratic	Suzanne Woodard	10,803	17.7
Democratic	Scott McMullen	4,163	6.8
Democratic	Ivan Lewis	1,828	2.9
Total votes		61,166	100.0
General election
Republican	Greg Gilday	45,768	50.5
Democratic	Angie Homola	44,877	49.5
Total votes		90,645	100.0
Republican hold			

10th House District Position 2 election, 2020
Primary election
Party	Candidate	Votes	%
Republican	Bill Bruch	30,248	48.7
Democratic	Dave Paul (incumbent)	29,215	47.1
Progressive	Taylor Zimmermann	2,592	4.2
Total votes		62,055	100.0
General election
Democratic	Dave Paul (incumbent)	46,199	50.4
Republican	Bill Bruch	45,461	49.6
Total votes		91,660	100.0
Democratic hold			

=== District 11 ===
11th House District Position 1 election, 2020
Primary election
Party	Candidate	Votes	%
Democratic	David Hackney	16,306	46.1
Democratic	Zack Hudgins (incumbent)	12,020	33.9
No party preference	Jay Stark (Note: Listed on ballot as "States No Party Preference.")	7,066	20.0
Total votes		35,392	100.0
General election
Democratic	David Hackney	36,414	63.5
Democratic	Zack Hudgins (incumbent)	20,974	36.5
Total votes		57,388	100.0
Democratic hold			

11th House District Position 2 election, 2020
Primary election
Party	Candidate	Votes	%
Democratic	Steve Bergquist (incumbent)	27,010	71.4
Republican	Sean Atchison	10,798	28.6
Total votes		37,808	100.0
General election
Democratic	Steve Bergquist (incumbent)	47,074	70.8
Republican	Sean Atchison	19,456	29.2
Total votes		66,530	100.0
Democratic hold			

=== District 12 ===
12th House District Position 1 election, 2020
Primary election
Party	Candidate	Votes	%
Republican	Keith Goehner (incumbent)	32,409	64.7
Democratic	Adrianne Moore	17,684	35.3
Total votes		50,093	100.0
General election
Republican	Keith Goehner (incumbent)	45,817	60.4
Democratic	Adrianne Moore	29,998	39.6
Total votes		75,815	100.0
Republican hold			

12th House District Position 2 election, 2020
Primary election
Party	Candidate	Votes	%
Republican	Mike Steele (incumbent)	37,110	100.0
Total votes		37,110	100.0
General election
Republican	Mike Steele (incumbent)	57,281	100.0
Total votes		57,281	100.0
Republican hold			

=== District 13 ===
13th House District Position 1 election, 2020
Primary election
Party	Candidate	Votes	%
Republican	Tom Dent (incumbent)	31,136	74.5
Democratic	Eduardo Castañeda-Díaz	9,553	22.8
Democratic	John 'the man' Malan (Note: Listed on ballot as "Prefers Classical Democrat Party.")	1,136	2.7
Total votes		41,825	100.0
General election
Republican	Tom Dent (incumbent)	47,701	71.4
Democratic	Eduardo Castañeda-Díaz	19,104	28.6
Total votes		66,805	100.0
Republican hold			

13th House District Position 2 election, 2020
Primary election
Party	Candidate	Votes	%
Republican	Alex Ybarra (incumbent)	33,029	100.0
Total votes		33,029	100.0
General election
Republican	Alex Ybarra (incumbent)	55,215	100.0
Total votes		55,215	100.0
Republican hold			

=== District 14 ===
14th House District Position 1 election, 2020
Primary election
Party	Candidate	Votes	%
Republican	Chris Corry (incumbent)	24,450	62.3
Democratic	Tracy Rushing	13,864	35.3
Education Party	William Razey (Note: Listed on ballot as "Prefers Education Party.")	954	2.4
Total votes		39,268	100.0
General election
Republican	Chris Corry (incumbent)	39,519	59.7
Democratic	Tracy Rushing	26,721	40.3
Total votes		66,240	100.0
Republican hold			

14th House District Position 2 election, 2020
Primary election
Party	Candidate	Votes	%
Republican	Gina Mosbrucker (incumbent)	28,966	100.0
Total votes		28,966	100.0
General election
Republican	Gina Mosbrucker (incumbent)	39,285	59.8
Democratic	Devin Kuh	26,435	40.2
Total votes		65,720	100.0
Republican hold			

=== District 15 ===
15th House District Position 1 election, 2020
Primary election
Party	Candidate	Votes	%
Republican	Bruce Chandler (incumbent)	16,545	67.7
Democratic	Jack McEntire	7,892	32.3
Total votes		24,437	100.0
General election
Republican	Bruce Chandler (incumbent)	26,784	58.0
Democratic	Jack McEntire	19,376	42.0
Total votes		46,160	100.0
Republican hold			

15th House District Position 2 election, 2020
Primary election
Party	Candidate	Votes	%
Republican	Jeremie Dufault (incumbent)	16,691	68.2
Democratic	AJ Cooper	7,782	31.8
Total votes		24,473	100.0
General election
Republican	Jeremie Dufault (incumbent)	27,313	59.1
Democratic	AJ Cooper	18,873	40.9
Total votes		46,186	100.0
Republican hold			

=== District 16 ===
16th House District Position 1 election, 2020
Primary election
Party	Candidate	Votes	%
Republican	Mark Klicker	25,437	66.7
Democratic	Frances Chvatal	12,702	33.3
Total votes		38,139	100.0
General election
Republican	Mark Klicker	38,570	63.6
Democratic	Frances Chvatal	22,056	36.4
Total votes		60,626	100.0
Republican hold			

16th House District Position 2 election, 2020
Primary election
Party	Candidate	Votes	%
Republican	Skyler Rude (incumbent)	26,461	70.0
Democratic	Carly Coburn	11,359	30.0
Total votes		37,820	100.0
General election
Republican	Skyler Rude (incumbent)	41,142	68.2
Democratic	Carly Coburn	19,163	31.8
Total votes		60,305	100.0
Republican hold			

=== District 17 ===
17th House District Position 1 election, 2020
Primary election
Party	Candidate	Votes	%
Republican	Vicki Kraft (incumbent)	24,504	53.3
Democratic	Tanisha L. Harris	21,485	46.7
Total votes		45,989	100.0
General election
Republican	Vicki Kraft (incumbent)	41,908	51.1
Democratic	Tanisha L. Harris	40,137	48.9
Total votes		82,045	100.0
Republican hold			

17th House District Position 2 election, 2020
Primary election
Party	Candidate	Votes	%
Republican	Paul Harris (incumbent)	25,213	69.4
Republican	Bryan White	11,119	30.6
Total votes		36,332	100.0
General election
Republican	Paul Harris (incumbent)	48,392	70.7
Republican	Bryan White	20,020	29.3
Total votes		68,412	100.0
Republican hold			

=== District 18 ===
18th House District Position 1 election, 2020
Primary election
Party	Candidate	Votes	%
Republican	Brandon Vick (incumbent)	34,229	60.9
Republican	Kassandra Bessert	21,999	39.1
Total votes		56,228	100.0
General election
Republican	Brandon Vick (incumbent)	57,566	61.3
Democratic	Kassandra Bessert	36,414	38.7
Total votes		93,980	100.0
Republican hold			

18th House District Position 2 election, 2020
Primary election
Party	Candidate	Votes	%
Republican	Larry Hoff (incumbent)	31,791	56.4
Democratic	Donna L. Sinclair	24,604	43.6
Total votes		56,395	100.0
General election
Republican	Larry Hoff (incumbent)	53,773	57.1
Democratic	Donna L. Sinclair	40,457	42.9
Total votes		94,230	100.0
Republican hold			

=== District 19 ===
19th House District Position 1 election, 2020
Primary election
Party	Candidate	Votes	%
Republican	Jim Walsh (incumbent)	27,203	57.7
Democratic	Marianna Everson	10,525	22.3
Democratic	Clint Bryson	9,447	20.0
Total votes		47,175	100.0
General election
Republican	Jim Walsh (incumbent)	43,315	59.4
Democratic	Marianna Everson	29,625	40.6
Total votes		72,940	100.0
Republican hold			

19th House District Position 2 election, 2020
Primary election
Party	Candidate	Votes	%
Republican	Joel McEntire	25,081	53.3
Democratic	Brian E. Blake (incumbent)	21,960	46.7
Total votes		47,041	100.0
General election
Republican	Joel McEntire	38,369	52.6
Democratic	Brian E. Blake (incumbent)	34,599	47.4
Total votes		72,968	100.0
Republican gain from Democratic			

=== District 20 ===
20th House District Position 1 election, 2020
Primary election
Party	Candidate	Votes	%
Republican	Peter Abbarno	25,368	47.2
Democratic	Timothy Zahn	14,056	26.1
Republican	Brian Lange	12,881	23.9
No party preference	Kurtis Engle	1,502	2.8
Total votes		53,807	100.0
General election
Republican	Peter Abbarno	58,484	70.8
Democratic	Timothy Zahn	24,079	29.2
Total votes		82,563	100.0
Republican hold			

20th House District Position 2 election, 2020
Primary election
Party	Candidate	Votes	%
Republican	Ed Orcutt (incumbent)	39,842	73.5
Democratic	Will Rollet	14,356	26.5
Total votes		54,198	100.0
General election
Republican	Ed Orcutt (incumbent)	60,030	72.9
Democratic	Will Rollet	22,352	27.1
Total votes		82,382	100.0
Republican hold			

=== District 21 ===
21st House District Position 1 election, 2020
Primary election
Party	Candidate	Votes	%
Democratic	Strom H. Peterson (incumbent)	25,272	55.6
Republican	Brian Thompson	15,829	34.9
Democratic	Gant Diede	4,307	9.5
Total votes		45,408	100.0
General election
Democratic	Strom H. Peterson (incumbent)	50,793	64.6
Republican	Brian Thompson	27,801	35.4
Total votes		78,594	100.0
Democratic hold			

21st House District Position 2 election, 2020
Primary election
Party	Candidate	Votes	%
Democratic	Lillian Ortiz-Self (incumbent)	29,673	64.8
Republican	Amy Schaper	15,034	32.8
No party preference	Willie Russell	1,110	2.4
Total votes		45,817	100.0
General election
Democratic	Lillian Ortiz-Self (incumbent)	51,619	66.0
Republican	Amy Schaper	26,607	34.0
Total votes		78,226	100.0
Democratic hold			

=== District 22 ===
22nd House District Position 1 election, 2020
Primary election
Party	Candidate	Votes	%
Democratic	Laurie Dolan (incumbent)	35,514	60.9
Republican	J. D. Ingram	16,796	28.8
Libertarian	Allen Acosta	3,004	5.2
Socialist	Jonny Meade	3,000	5.1
Total votes		58,314	100.0
General election
Democratic	Laurie Dolan (incumbent)	59,959	66.6
Republican	J. D. Ingram	30,075	33.4
Total votes		90,034	100.0
Democratic hold			

22nd House District Position 2 election, 2020
Primary election
Party	Candidate	Votes	%
Republican	Dusty Pierpoint	20,652	35.5
Democratic	Jessica Bateman	19,236	33.1
Democratic	Mary Ellen Biggerstaff	7,858	13.5
Democratic	Glenda Breiler	7,397	12.7
Democratic	Anthony Novack	3,019	5.2
Total votes		58,162	100.0
General election
Democratic	Jessica Bateman	54,219	60.0
Republican	Dusty Pierpoint	36,203	40.0
Total votes		90,422	100.0
Democratic hold			

=== District 23 ===
23rd House District Position 1 election, 2020
Primary election
Party	Candidate	Votes	%
Democratic	Tarra Simmons	24,191	45.2
Republican	April Ferguson	18,868	35.2
Democratic	Leslie J. Daugs	7,932	14.8
Democratic	Lou Krukar	1,653	3.1
Democratic	James Beall	889	1.7
Total votes		53,533	100.0
General election
Democratic	Tarra Simmons	53,154	62.0
Republican	April Ferguson	32,620	38.0
Total votes		85,774	100.0
Democratic hold			

23rd House District Position 2 election, 2020
Primary election
Party	Candidate	Votes	%
Democratic	Drew Hansen (incumbent)	34,572	63.8
Republican	Elaina Gonzales-Blanton	19,575	36.2
Total votes		54,147	100.0
General election
Democratic	Drew Hansen (incumbent)	53,425	62.3
Republican	Elaina Gonzales-Blanton	32,317	37.7
Total votes		85,742	100.0
Democratic hold			

=== District 24 ===
24th House District Position 1 election, 2020
Primary election
Party	Candidate	Votes	%
Democratic	Mike Chapman (incumbent)	34,982	55.6
Republican	Sue Forde	17,920	28.5
Republican	Daniel Charles Svoboda (Note: Listed on ballot as "Prefers Trump Republican Party.")	9,966	15.9
Total votes		62,868	100.0
General election
Democratic	Mike Chapman (incumbent)	49,965	54.2
Republican	Sue Forde	42,207	45.8
Total votes		92,172	100.0
Democratic hold			

24th House District Position 2 election, 2020
Primary election
Party	Candidate	Votes	%
Democratic	Steve Tharinger (incumbent)	28,800	46.5
Republican	Brian Pruiett	16,755	27.1
Republican	Jodi Wilke	11,348	18.3
Democratic	Darren Corcoran	5,026	8.1
Total votes		61,929	100.0
General election
Democratic	Steve Tharinger (incumbent)	49,262	53.7
Republican	Brian Pruiett	42,515	46.3
Total votes		91,777	100.0
Democratic hold			

=== District 25 ===
25th House District Position 1 election, 2020
Primary election
Party	Candidate	Votes	%
Republican	Kelly Chambers (incumbent)	25,342	55.8
Democratic	Jamie Smith	20,060	44.2
Total votes		45,402	100.0
General election
Republican	Kelly Chambers (incumbent)	41,055	53.5
Democratic	Jamie Smith	35,742	46.5
Total votes		76,797	100.0
Republican hold			

25th House District Position 2 election, 2020
Primary election
Party	Candidate	Votes	%
Republican	Cyndy Jacobsen	24,682	54.5
Democratic	Brian Duthie	20,569	45.5
Total votes		45,251	100.0
General election
Republican	Cyndy Jacobsen	40,242	52.5
Democratic	Brian Duthie	36,406	47.5
Total votes		76,648	100.0
Republican hold			

=== District 26 ===
26th House District Position 1 election, 2020
Primary election
Party	Candidate	Votes	%
Republican	Jesse L. Young (incumbent)	30,095	52.6
Democratic	Carrie Hesch	23,404	40.8
Democratic	Drew Darsow	3,797	6.6
Total votes		57,296	100.0
General election
Republican	Jesse L. Young (incumbent)	47,171	52.8
Democratic	Carrie Hesch	42,113	47.2
Total votes		89,284	100.0
Republican hold			

26th House District Position 2 election, 2020
Primary election
Party	Candidate	Votes	%
Democratic	Joy Stanford	24,820	43.0
Republican	Michelle Caldier (incumbent)	21,551	37.3
Republican	Alisha Beeler	11,412	19.7
Total votes		57,783	100.0
General election
Republican	Michelle Caldier (incumbent)	48,973	54.9
Democratic	Joy Stanford	40,189	45.1
Total votes		89,162	100.0
Republican hold			

=== District 27 ===
27th House District Position 1 election, 2020
Primary election
Party	Candidate	Votes	%
Democratic	Laurie Jinkins (incumbent)	32,636	81.9
Democratic	Ryan Talen	7,194	18.1
Total votes		39,830	100.0
General election
Democratic	Laurie Jinkins (incumbent)	54,770	81.8
Democratic	Ryan Talen	12,158	18.2
Total votes		66,928	100.0
Democratic hold			

27th House District Position 2 election, 2020
Primary election
Party	Candidate	Votes	%
Democratic	Jake Fey (incumbent)	32,871	75.5
Independent	Barry Knowles	10,671	24.5
Total votes		43,542	100.0
General election
Democratic	Jake Fey (incumbent)	52,081	72.1
Independent	Barry Knowles	20,177	27.9
Total votes		72,258	100.0
Democratic hold			

=== District 28 ===
28th House District Position 1 election, 2020
Primary election
Party	Candidate	Votes	%
Democratic	Mari Leavitt (incumbent)	24,845	57.2
Republican	Kevin Ballard	18,575	42.8
Total votes		43,420	100.0
General election
Democratic	Mari Leavitt (incumbent)	39,973	57.3
Republican	Kevin Ballard	29,785	42.7
Total votes		69,758	100.0
Democratic hold			

28th House District Position 2 election, 2020
Primary election
Party	Candidate	Votes	%
Democratic	Dan Bronoske	22,679	52.5
Republican	Chris Nye	10,817	25.0
Republican	Jamie Michaud	9,711	22.5
Total votes		43,207	100.0
General election
Democratic	Dan Bronoske	38,365	55.1
Republican	Chris Nye	31,227	44.9
Total votes		69,592	100.0
Democratic hold			

=== District 29 ===
29th House District Position 1 election, 2020
Primary election
Party	Candidate	Votes	%
Democratic	Melanie Morgan (incumbent)	18,509	62.2
Republican	Koshin Mohamed Fidaar	11,268	37.8
Total votes		29,777	100.0
General election
Democratic	Melanie Morgan (incumbent)	36,634	63.8
Republican	Koshin Mohamed Fidaar	20,745	36.2
Total votes		57,379	100.0
Democratic hold			

29th House District Position 2 election, 2020
Primary election
Party	Candidate	Votes	%
Republican	Terry Harder	11,874	39.0
Democratic	Steve Kirby (incumbent)	9,330	30.6
Democratic	Sharlett Mena	9,248	30.4
Total votes		30,452	100.0
General election
Democratic	Steve Kirby (incumbent)	34,149	59.1
Republican	Terry Harder	23,619	40.9
Total votes		57,768	100.0
Democratic hold			

=== District 30 ===
30th House District Position 1 election, 2020
Primary election
Party	Candidate	Votes	%
Democratic	Jamila Taylor	15,773	43.8
Independent Republican	Martin A. Moore	9,849	27.4
Republican	Janis Clark	6,139	17.1
Democratic	Cheryl Hurst	4,226	11.7
Total votes		35,987	100.0
General election
Democratic	Jamila Taylor	36,338	57.9
Independent Republican	Martin A. Moore	26,406	42.1
Total votes		62,744	100.0
Democratic hold			

30th House District Position 2 election, 2020
Primary election
Party	Candidate	Votes	%
Democratic	Jesse Johnson (incumbent)	20,606	57.1
Republican	Jack Walsh	12,075	33.5
Republican	Mark Greene	2,148	6.0
Republican	Chris Dowllar	1,241	3.4
Total votes		36,070	100.0
General election
Democratic	Jesse Johnson (incumbent)	37,941	60.3
Republican	Jack Walsh	24,948	39.7
Total votes		62,889	100.0
Democratic hold			

=== District 31 ===
31st House District Position 1 election, 2020
Primary election
Party	Candidate	Votes	%
Republican	Drew Stokesbary (incumbent)	32,702	63.1
Democratic	Katie Young	16,765	32.4
No party preference	Zach Stover	2,321	4.5
Total votes		51,788	100.0
General election
Republican	Drew Stokesbary (incumbent)	54,517	63.5
Democratic	Katie Young	31,306	36.5
Total votes		85,823	100.0
Republican hold			

31st House District Position 2 election, 2020
Primary election
Party	Candidate	Votes	%
Republican	Eric E. Robertson	19,096	37.1
Democratic	Thomas R. Clark	17,308	33.6
Republican	Jerimy Kirschner	15,078	29.3
Total votes		51,482	100.0
General election
Republican	Eric E. Robertson	53,858	63.0
Democratic	Thomas R. Clark	31,657	37.0
Total votes		85,515	100.0
Republican hold			

=== District 32 ===
32nd House District Position 1 election, 2020
Primary election
Party	Candidate	Votes	%
Democratic	Cindy Ryu (incumbent)	29,641	65.2
Democratic	Shirley Sutton	11,368	25.0
Democratic	Keith Smith	4,451	9.8
Total votes		45,460	100.0
General election
Democratic	Cindy Ryu (incumbent)	52,703	72.8
Democratic	Shirley Sutton	19,658	27.2
Total votes		72,361	100.0
Democratic hold			

32nd House District Position 2 election, 2020
Primary election
Party	Candidate	Votes	%
Democratic	Lauren Davis (incumbent)	34,915	74.2
No party preference	Tamra Smilanich (Note: Listed on primary ballot as "Prefers Non Partisan Party" and on general election ballot as "States No Party Preference.")	7,791	16.6
Democratic	Gray Petersen	4,314	9.2
Total votes		47,020	100.0
General election
Democratic	Lauren Davis (incumbent)	59,115	86.5
No party preference	Tamra Smilanich	9,235	13.5
Total votes		68,350	100.0
Democratic hold			

=== District 33 ===
33rd House District Position 1 election, 2020
Primary election
Party	Candidate	Votes	%
Democratic	Tina L. Orwall (incumbent)	26,424	100.0
Total votes		26,424	100.0
General election
Democratic	Tina L. Orwall (incumbent)	43,397	71.5
Republican	Kerry French	17,270	28.5
Total votes		60,667	100.0
Democratic hold			

33rd House District Position 2 election, 2020
Primary election
Party	Candidate	Votes	%
Democratic	Mia Su-Ling Gregerson (incumbent)	24,105	77.1
Libertarian	Marliza Melzer	7,159	22.9
Total votes		31,264	100.0
General election
Democratic	Mia Su-Ling Gregerson (incumbent)	42,578	73.8
Libertarian	Marliza Melzer	15,123	26.2
Total votes		57,701	100.0
Democratic hold			

=== District 34 ===
34th House District Position 1 election, 2020
Primary election
Party	Candidate	Votes	%
Democratic	Eileen L. Cody (incumbent)	49,238	100.0
Total votes		49,238	100.0
General election
Democratic	Eileen L. Cody (incumbent)	73,609	100.0
Total votes		73,609	100.0
Democratic hold			

34th House District Position 2 election, 2020
Primary election
Party	Candidate	Votes	%
Democratic	Joe Fitzgibbon (incumbent)	49,241	100.0
Total votes		49,241	100.0
General election
Democratic	Joe Fitzgibbon (incumbent)	73,231	100.0
Total votes		73,231	100.0
Democratic hold			

=== District 35 ===
35th House District Position 1 election, 2020
Primary election
Party	Candidate	Votes	%
Republican	Dan Griffey (incumbent)	32,459	58.3
Democratic	Colton Myers	23,234	41.7
Total votes		55,693	100.0
General election
Republican	Dan Griffey (incumbent)	49,314	58.4
Democratic	Colton Myers	35,131	41.6
Total votes		84,445	100.0
Republican hold			

35th House District Position 2 election, 2020
Primary election
Party	Candidate	Votes	%
Republican	Drew C. MacEwen (incumbent)	30,723	55.2
Democratic	Darcy Huffman	23,506	42.2
Shortstop Party	Earl W. Burt (Note: Listed on ballot as "Prefers Shortstop Party.")	1,433	2.6
Total votes		55,662	100.0
General election
Republican	Drew C. MacEwen (incumbent)	47,618	56.5
Democratic	Darcy Huffman	36,668	43.5
Total votes		84,286	100.0
Republican hold			

=== District 36 ===
36th House District Position 1 election, 2020
Primary election
Party	Candidate	Votes	%
Democratic	Noel Christina Frame (incumbent)	57,886	100.0
Total votes		57,886	100.0
General election
Democratic	Noel Christina Frame (incumbent)	86,090	100.0
Total votes		86,090	100.0
Democratic hold			

36th House District Position 2 election, 2020
Primary election
Party	Candidate	Votes	%
Democratic	Liz Berry	33,333	51.5
Democratic	Sarah Reyneveld	27,365	42.2
Democratic	Jeffrey M. Cohen	4,078	6.3
Total votes		64,776	100.0
General election
Democratic	Liz Berry	55,717	58.7
Democratic	Sarah Reyneveld	39,131	41.3
Total votes		94,848	100.0
Democratic hold			

=== District 37 ===
37th House District Position 1 election, 2020
Primary election
Party	Candidate	Votes	%
Democratic	Sharon Tomiko Santos (incumbent)	40,028	77.8
Democratic	John Stafford	6,141	11.9
Democratic	William Burroughs	2,829	5.5
No party preference	John Dickinson	2,483	4.8
Total votes		51,481	100.0
General election
Democratic	Sharon Tomiko Santos (incumbent)	63,557	82.8
Democratic	John Stafford	13,165	17.2
Total votes		76,722	100.0
Democratic hold			

37th House District Position 2 election, 2020
Primary election
Party	Candidate	Votes	%
Democratic	Kirsten Harris-Talley	26,940	51.3
Democratic	Chukundi Salisbury	12,141	23.1
Democratic	Andrea Caupain	5,845	11.1
Republican	Stephen Richter	4,480	8.5
Democratic	Robert Redwine	1,300	2.5
Democratic	Andy Goeres	1,230	2.3
Progressive	Kathy M. Woodward	618	1.2
Total votes		52,554	100.0
General election
Democratic	Kirsten Harris-Talley	50,780	66.4
Democratic	Chukundi Salisbury	25,706	33.6
Total votes		76,486	100.0
Democratic hold			

=== District 38 ===
38th House District Position 1 election, 2020
Primary election
Party	Candidate	Votes	%
Democratic	Emily Wicks	19,502	49.5
Republican	Bert Johnson	14,961	38.0
Democratic	Lacey Sauvageau	2,873	7.3
Libertarian	Jorge Garrido	2,068	5.2
Total votes		39,404	100.0
General election
Democratic	Emily Wicks	39,730	59.0
Republican	Bert Johnson	27,651	41.0
Total votes		67,381	100.0
Democratic hold			

38th House District Position 2 election, 2020
Primary election
Party	Candidate	Votes	%
Democratic	Mike Sells (incumbent)	25,215	68.6
Libertarian	David Wiley	11,568	31.4
Total votes		36,783	100.0
General election
Democratic	Mike Sells (incumbent)	43,178	67.5
Libertarian	David Wiley	20,810	32.5
Total votes		63,988	100.0
Democratic hold			

=== District 39 ===
39th House District Position 1 election, 2020
Primary election
Party	Candidate	Votes	%
Republican	Robert J. Sutherland (incumbent)	30,685	61.4
Democratic	Claus Joens	19,303	38.6
Total votes		49,988	100.0
General election
Republican	Robert J. Sutherland (incumbent)	48,716	60.1
Democratic	Claus Joens	32,349	39.9
Total votes		81,065	100.0
Republican hold			

39th House District Position 2 election, 2020
Primary election
Party	Candidate	Votes	%
Republican	Carolyn Eslick (incumbent)	24,389	49.1
Democratic	Ryan Johnson	17,775	35.7
Republican	Sandy Mesenbrink	7,558	15.2
Total votes		49,722	100.0
General election
Republican	Carolyn Eslick (incumbent)	51,067	63.1
Democratic	Ryan Johnson	29,833	36.9
Total votes		80,900	100.0
Republican hold			

=== District 40 ===
40th House District Position 1 election, 2020
Primary election
Party	Candidate	Votes	%
Democratic	Debra Lekanoff (incumbent)	41,704	100.0
Total votes		41,704	100.0
General election
Democratic	Debra Lekanoff (incumbent)	64,898	100.0
Total votes		64,898	100.0
Democratic hold			

40th House District Position 2 election, 2020
Primary election
Party	Candidate	Votes	%
Democratic	Alex Ramel (incumbent)	39,524	68.6
Republican	Russ Dzialo	18,114	31.4
Total votes		57,638	100.0
General election
Democratic	Alex Ramel (incumbent)	58,915	68.2
Republican	Russ Dzialo	27,408	31.8
Total votes		86,323	100.0
Democratic hold			

=== District 41 ===
41st House District Position 1 election, 2020
Primary election
Party	Candidate	Votes	%
Democratic	Tana Senn (incumbent)	38,802	100.0
Total votes		38,802	100.0
General election
Democratic	Tana Senn (incumbent)	63,815	100.0
Total votes		63,815	100.0
Democratic hold			

41st House District Position 2 election, 2020
Primary election
Party	Candidate	Votes	%
Democratic	My-Linh Thai (incumbent)	30,617	59.2
Republican	Al Rosenthal	14,004	27.1
Independent	Harlan Gallinger	3,821	7.4
Democratic	Aaron Leedham	3,290	6.3
Total votes		51,732	100.0
General election
Democratic	My-Linh Thai (incumbent)	55,609	66.7
Republican	Al Rosenthal	27,808	33.3
Total votes		83,417	100.0
Democratic hold			

=== District 42 ===
42nd House District Position 1 election, 2020
Primary election
Party	Candidate	Votes	%
Republican	Luanne Van Werven (incumbent)	32,535	51.9
Democratic	Alicia Rule	30,167	48.1
Total votes		62,702	100.0
General election
Democratic	Alicia Rule	47,260	51.2
Republican	Luanne Van Werven (incumbent)	45,104	48.8
Total votes		92,364	100.0
Democratic gain from Republican			

42nd House District Position 2 election, 2020
Primary election
Party	Candidate	Votes	%
Republican	Jennifer Sefzik	31,599	50.5
Democratic	Sharon Shewmake (incumbent)	31,008	49.5
Total votes		62,607	100.0
General election
Democratic	Sharon Shewmake (incumbent)	47,702	51.7
Republican	Jennifer Sefzik	44,501	48.3
Total votes		92,203	100.0
Democratic hold			

=== District 43 ===
43rd House District Position 1 election, 2020
Primary election
Party	Candidate	Votes	%
Democratic	Nicole Macri (incumbent)	59,163	92.0
Republican	Leslie Klein	4,159	6.5
No party preference	Brandon Franklin	957	1.5
Total votes		64,279	100.0
General election
Democratic	Nicole Macri (incumbent)	86,409	91.0
Republican	Leslie Klein	8,552	9.0
Total votes		94,961	100.0
Democratic hold			

43rd House District Position 2 election, 2020
Primary election
Party	Candidate	Votes	%
Democratic	Frank Chopp (incumbent)	31,414	50.2
Seattle People's Party	Sherae Lascelles (Note: Listed on ballot as "Prefers Seattle People's Party Party.")	19,637	31.4
Democratic	Jessi Murray	11,520	18.4
Total votes		62,571	100.0
General election
Democratic	Frank Chopp (incumbent)	61,788	66.6
Seattle People's Party	Sherae Lascelles	31,029	33.4
Total votes		92,817	100.0
Democratic hold			

=== District 44 ===
44th House District Position 1 election, 2020
Primary election
Party	Candidate	Votes	%
Democratic	John Lovick (incumbent)	30,314	55.6
Republican	John T. Kartak	24,194	44.4
Total votes		54,508	100.0
General election
Democratic	John Lovick (incumbent)	50,729	57.2
Republican	John T. Kartak	37,962	42.8
Total votes		88,691	100.0
Democratic hold			

44th House District Position 2 election, 2020
Primary election
Party	Candidate	Votes	%
Republican	Mark A. James	25,594	47.4
Democratic	April Berg	17,587	32.6
Democratic	Anne Anderson	10,800	20.0
Total votes		53,981	100.0
General election
Democratic	April Berg	45,572	51.8
Republican	Mark A. James	42,417	48.2
Total votes		87,989	100.0
Democratic hold			

=== District 45 ===
45th House District Position 1 election, 2020
Primary election
Party	Candidate	Votes	%
Democratic	Roger Goodman (incumbent)	39,079	73.0
Republican	John P. Gibbons	14,446	27.0
Total votes		53,525	100.0
General election
Democratic	Roger Goodman (incumbent)	60,186	71.7
Republican	John P. Gibbons	23,778	28.3
Total votes		83,964	100.0
Democratic hold			

45th House District Position 2 election, 2020
Primary election
Party	Candidate	Votes	%
Democratic	Larry Springer (incumbent)	36,657	67.8
Republican	Amber Krabach	17,392	32.2
Total votes		54,049	100.0
General election
Democratic	Larry Springer (incumbent)	56,562	67.0
Republican	Amber Krabach	27,817	33.0
Total votes		84,379	100.0
Democratic hold			

=== District 46 ===
46th House District Position 1 election, 2020
Primary election
Party	Candidate	Votes	%
Democratic	Gerry Pollet (incumbent)	53,779	85.9
Republican	Eric J. Brown	8,830	14.1
Total votes		62,609	100.0
General election
Democratic	Gerry Pollet (incumbent)	76,563	83.9
Republican	Eric J. Brown	14,704	16.1
Total votes		91,267	100.0
Democratic hold			

46th House District Position 2 election, 2020
Primary election
Party	Candidate	Votes	%
Democratic	Javier Valdez (incumbent)	52,007	83.0
Republican	Beth Daranciang	10,679	17.0
Total votes		62,686	100.0
General election
Democratic	Javier Valdez (incumbent)	74,377	81.7
Republican	Beth Daranciang	16,705	18.3
Total votes		91,082	100.0
Democratic hold			

=== District 47 ===
47th House District Position 1 election, 2020
Primary election
Party	Candidate	Votes	%
Democratic	Debra Entenman (incumbent)	23,837	57.0
Republican	Kyle Lyebyedyev	17,963	43.0
Total votes		41,800	100.0
General election
Democratic	Debra Entenman (incumbent)	42,147	58.6
Republican	Kyle Lyebyedyev	29,719	41.4
Total votes		71,866	100.0
Democratic hold			

47th House District Position 2 election, 2020
Primary election
Party	Candidate	Votes	%
Democratic	Pat Sullivan (incumbent)	23,717	56.5
Republican	Ted Cooke	12,817	30.5
Republican	Joseph Cimaomo, Jr.	4,154	9.9
Republican	Peter Thompson, Jr.	1,286	3.1
Total votes		41,974	100.0
General election
Democratic	Pat Sullivan (incumbent)	42,399	58.9
Republican	Ted Cooke	29,595	41.1
Total votes		71,994	100.0
Democratic hold			

=== District 48 ===
48th House District Position 1 election, 2020
Primary election
Party	Candidate	Votes	%
Democratic	Vandana Slatter (incumbent)	30,657	72.1
Republican	Victor H. Bishop	11,286	26.5
No party preference	Scott Dusenbery	595	1.4
Total votes		42,538	100.0
General election
Democratic	Vandana Slatter (incumbent)	49,426	71.3
Republican	Victor H. Bishop	19,884	28.7
Total votes		69,310	100.0
Democratic hold			

48th House District Position 2 election, 2020
Primary election
Party	Candidate	Votes	%
Democratic	Amy Walen (incumbent)	28,930	68.1
Republican	Tim J. Hickey	11,059	26.0
Democratic	Morgan Puchek	2,500	5.9
Total votes		42,489	100.0
General election
Democratic	Amy Walen (incumbent)	49,213	71.0
Republican	Tim J. Hickey	20,115	29.0
Total votes		69,328	100.0
Democratic hold			

=== District 49 ===
49th House District Position 1 election, 2020
Primary election
Party	Candidate	Votes	%
Democratic	Sharon Wylie (incumbent)	23,149	57.4
Republican	Justin Forsman	12,525	31.0
Independent	Kelli Danielle Fiskum	4,688	11.6
Total votes		40,362	100.0
General election
Democratic	Sharon Wylie (incumbent)	45,684	63.1
Republican	Justin Forsman	26,736	36.9
Total votes		72,420	100.0
Democratic hold			

49th House District Position 2 election, 2020
Primary election
Party	Candidate	Votes	%
Democratic	Monica Stonier (incumbent)	24,130	60.6
Republican	Park Llafet	12,929	32.4
Independent	Troy Potter	2,792	7.0
Total votes		39,851	100.0
General election
Democratic	Monica Stonier (incumbent)	45,578	62.6
Republican	Park Llafet	27,211	37.4
Total votes		72,789	100.0
Democratic hold			

== See also ==
- 2020 Washington elections
  - 2020 Washington State Senate election
  - 2020 Washington gubernatorial election
  - 2020 Washington lieutenant gubernatorial election
  - 2020 United States presidential election in Washington (state)
  - 2020 United States House of Representatives elections in Washington
