= June Leonard =

American politician

Member of the Washington House of Representatives from the 11th district
- In office 1985 – April 21, 1994 Serving with Eugene V. Lux, Margarita Prentice, Velma Veloria
- Preceded by: Avery Garrett
- Succeeded by: Eileen Cody

Personal details
- Born: Seattle, Washington
- Died: April 21, 1994 Seattle, Washington
- Party: Democratic

June Leonard (died April 21, 1994) was an American politician. She was a Democrat, representing District 11 in the Washington House of Representatives which included areas from Kennydale, downtown Renton, and up both sides of the Duwamish River corridor (I-5) into downtown Seattle, from 1985 to 1994.
