= Whole Washington =

Healthcare advocacy organization

- The Whole Washington logo
- Formation: 2017
- Tax ID no.: 81-5318858
- Purpose: Universal health care advocacy
- Location: Washington state
- Executive director: Andre Stackhouse
- Website: wholewashington.org

Whole Washington is a statewide universal healthcare advocacy organization in Washington state that advocates for universal single-payer healthcare for Washington and the United States of America. Whole Washington is a 501(c)(4) organization and has campaigns for statewide single payer healthcare in Washington via both the state legislature and statewide ballot initiative. It is also a supporter of single payer at the federal level through Medicare for All as introduced into the US Congress by Pramila Jayapal in the House of Representatives and Bernie Sanders in the Senate.

== History ==
Whole Washington was founded in 2017 in order to run a ballot measure campaign to legally establish a universal single payer healthcare plan for Washington state. In 2018 Erin Georgen filed a ballot initiative to the people (I-1600) to establish a statewide single payer healthcare plan called the Whole Washington Health Trust. The campaign was entirely volunteer run and collected over 100,000 signatures which was short of the necessary number to put the initiative on the ballot.

In 2019 Senator Bob Hasegawa (WA-11) introduced the first legislative version of the Washington Health Trust into the state Senate as SB.5222. Since its debut, the bill has been reintroduced three additional times but never been given a public hearing or floor vote. In 2025 it was debuted into the state House by Representative Lisa Parshley as HB.1445.

In 2021 Whole Washington ran an updated version of I-1600 as an initiative to the legislature (I-1362) but the campaign was suspended in August 2021 due to public health concerns during the spike of the Delta variant of COVID-19.

In 2022, campaign director Andre Stackhouse filed I-1471 on behalf of Whole Washington but the initiative did not ultimately collect enough signatures to make the ballot.

== Structure ==
Whole Washington is a 501(c)(4) nonprofit organization which organizes at the state and federal levels of government on healthcare issues, especially the advocacy of single payer healthcare. It pursues political change through both legislation and the ballot initiative process.

== Policy proposal ==
Whole Washington has since 2017 run multiple ballot initiatives and had multiple bills introduced into the Washington state legislature. While there have been variations between those policy proposals, they have all been different versions of statewide single payer healthcare for Washington state in which a public nonprofit insurance plan (called the Washington Health Trust in the latest version of the policy proposal) would be established by the Washington state government that all residents of the state would be eligible for. The plan's coverage includes dental, hearing, vision, reproductive care and other healthcare services not covered by traditional Medicare.

== Polling ==
A 2010 poll conducted by the University of Washington School of Public Health found that Washington voters favored universal health care even if it meant paying higher taxes by a margin of 10%.

In 2017, Northwest Progressive Institute (NPI) commissioned and released a poll of 887 likely Washington state voters via landline conducted by Public Policy Polling. The poll results showed 64 percent of those polled supported expanding Medicare to provide universal health coverage to all Americans—with 50 percent strongly supporting it and 14 percent somewhat supporting it. The 32 percent that opposed the initiative was broken down into 9 percent somewhat opposed and 23 percent strongly opposed. Of those polled, 4 percent were undecided or not sure.

== Selected Endorsements ==
Whole Washington's and its proposal the Washington Health Trust has been endorsed by a combination of labor unions, grassroots organizations, former and current legislators, city councils, and the Washington State Democratic Party (statewide as well as at the district and county level). Some of the endorsers include:

- Our Revolution (nationally and the Washington chapter)
- NAYA Action Fund
- Washington Poor People's Campaign
- Progressive Victory
- Seattle City Council
- Aberdeen City Council
- Tenants Union of Washington State
- Transit Riders Union
- International Brotherhood of Electrical Workers (IBEW) Local 46
- Society of Professional Engineering Employees in Aerospace (SPEEA) Local 2001
- Industrial Workers of the World - Tacoma
- Green Party - Washington
- Bob Hasegawa - a Washington state senator
- Marko Liias - a Washington state senator
- Kshama Sawant - a former member of the Seattle City Council
- Liz Berry (politician) - a representative in the Washington House of Representatives
- Katie Wilson - Mayor of Seattle
- Frank Chopp - Former Speaker of the Washington House of Representatives

== See also ==
- Single-payer healthcare
- Universal health care
- Physicians for a National Health Program
- Healthcare-NOW!
- National Nurses United
