= Washington's 11th legislative district =

American legislative district

Washington's 11th legislative district map

Washington's 11th legislative district is one of forty-nine districts in Washington state for representation in the state legislature.

After the 2010 redistricting process, the district included southern Seattle, Renton, Tukwila, and a portion of Kent. After the 2020 redistricting, the district included the cities of Tukwila, Renton, and a portion of Kent.

The district's legislators are state senator Bob Hasegawa and state representatives David Hackney (position 1) and Steve Bergquist (position 2), all Democrats.

== Recent elections results ==
=== State Senate ===
Washington's 11th State Senate District, 2024
Primary election
Party	Candidate	Votes	%
Democratic	Bob Hasegawa (incumbent)	21,167	95.3
Write-in		1,046	4.7
Total votes		22,213	100.0
General election
Democratic	Bob Hasegawa (incumbent)	47,324	95.6
Write-in		2,168	4.4
Total votes		49,492	100.0

=== State House of Representatives, Position 1 ===
Washington's 11th State House District Position 1, 2024
Primary election
Party	Candidate	Votes	%
Democratic	David Hackney (incumbent)	20,702	95.3
Write-in		1,019	4.7
Total votes		21,721	100.0
General election
Democratic	David Hackney (incumbent)	46,438	95.9
Write-in		1,978	4.1
Total votes		48,416	100.0

{{Election box open primary general election no change

Washington's 11th State House District Position 1, 2022
Primary election
Party	Candidate	Votes	%
Democratic	David Hackney (incumbent)	17,845	69.27
Republican	Stephanie Peters	7,868	30.5
Write-in		48	0.2
Total votes		25,761	100.0
Democratic	David Hackney (incumbent)	32,292	69.4
Republican	Stephanie Peters	14,204	30.5
Write-in		54	0.1
Total votes		46,550	100.0

=== State House of Representatives, Position 2 ===
Washington's 11th State House District Position 2, 2024
Primary election
Party	Candidate	Votes	%
Democratic	Steve Bergquist (incumbent)	20,342	80.3
Libertarian	Justin Greywolf	4,607	18.2
Write-in		372	1.5
Total votes		25,321	100.0
General election
Democratic	Steve Bergquist (incumbent)	43,389	76.9
Libertarian	Justin Greywolf	12,508	22.2
Write-in		541	1.0
Total votes		56,438	100.0

Washington's 11th State House District Position 2, 2022
Primary election
Party	Candidate	Votes	%
Democratic	Steve Bergquist (incumbent)	17,694	68.2
Republican	Jeanette Burrage	8,192	31.6
Write-in		42	0.2
Total votes		25,928	100.0
General election
Democratic	Steve Bergquist (incumbent)	31,979	68.4
Republican	Jeanette Burrage	14,747	31.5
Write-in		46	0.1
Total votes		46,772	100.0

=== Results ===
2024 United States presidential election in Washington's 11th Legislative District
Party	Candidate	Votes	%
Democratic	Kamala Harris; Tim Walz	43,168	66.6%
Republican	Donald Trump; JD Vance	19,238	29.7%
We the People	Robert F. Kennedy Jr. (withdrawn); Nicole Shanahan (withdrawn)	740	1.1%
Green	Jill Stein; Butch Ware	677	1.0%
Libertarian	Chase Oliver; Mike ter Maat	258	0.4%
Socialism and Liberation	Claudia de la Cruz Karina Garcia	168	0.3%
Justice for All	Cornel West; Melina Abdullah	148	0.2%
Independent	Shiva Ayyadurai; Crystal Ellis	50	0.1%
Socialist Equality	Joseph Kishore Jerome White	20	0.0%
Socialist Workers	Rachele Fruit Dennis Richter	20	0.0%
Write-in		339	0.5%
Total votes		64,826	100.00%

== Past legislators ==
=== Statehood-1932 ===
During this period, the state senate and state house districts were geographically distinct.

Year	Senate		House	
Year	Senator	Senate District Geography	House Position 1	House District Geography
1st (1889-1890)	Jacob Hunsaker (R)	Klickitat and Skamania counties		
2nd (1891-1892)	Eugene T. Wilson (R)	Douglas and Kittitas counties	House District Established	Columbia County
2nd (1891-1892)	Eugene T. Wilson (R)	Douglas and Kittitas counties	John L. Sharpstein (D)	Columbia County
3rd (1893-1894)	C. I. Helm (R)	Douglas and Kittitas counties	A. Cameron (R)	Columbia County
4th (1895-1896)	C. I. Helm (R)	Douglas and Kittitas counties	J. W. Morgan (R)	Columbia County
5th (1897-1898)	Daniel Paul (D)	Douglas and Kittitas counties	A. Mathiot (SvR)	Columbia County
6th (1899-1900)	Daniel Paul (D)	Douglas and Kittitas counties	Grant Copeland (R)	Columbia County
7th (1901-1902)	John P. Sharp (R)	Douglas and Kittitas counties	Grant Copeland (R)	Columbia County
8th (1903-1904)	Oliver T. Cornwell (R) (Note: Redistricted from the 9th senate district)	Douglas and Kittitas counties	Conrad Knoblock (R)	Columbia County
9th (1905-1906)	C. T. Hutson (R)	Adams, Franklin, and Walla Walla (part)	F. M. Weatherford (D)	Chehalis County (Note: Chehalis County is now named Grays Harbor County.)
10th (1907-1908)	C. T. Hutson (R)	Adams, Franklin, and Walla Walla (part)	M. M. Godman (D)	Chehalis County
11th (1909-1910)	John D. Bassett (R)	Adams, Franklin, and Walla Walla (part)	R. A. Jackson (R)	Chehalis County
12th (1911-1912)	John D. Bassett (R)	Adams, Franklin, and Walla Walla (part)	Joseph A. Fontaine (D)	Chehalis County
13th (1913-1914)	Daniel A. Scott (R)	Adams, Franklin, and Walla Walla (part)	Joseph A. Fontaine (D)	Chehalis County
14th (1915-1916)	Daniel A. Scott (R)	Adams, Franklin, and Walla Walla (part)	John F. Rockhill (R)	Chehalis County
15th (1917-1918)	Oliver T. Cornwell (R)	Adams, Franklin, and Walla Walla (part)	George Spalinger (D)	Chehalis County
16th (1919-1920)	Oliver T. Cornwell (R)	Adams, Franklin, and Walla Walla (part)	Harry F. Kennedy (R)	Chehalis County
17th (1921-1922)	Oliver T. Cornwell (R)	Adams, Franklin, and Walla Walla (part)	Harry F. Kennedy (R)	Chehalis County
18th (1923-1924)	Oliver T. Cornwell (R)	Adams, Franklin, and Walla Walla (part)	Harry F. Kennedy (R)	Chehalis County
19th (1925-1926)	William H. Kirkman (R)	Adams, Franklin, and Walla Walla (part)	Ed Davis (R) (Note: Elected Speaker of the House for the 21st legislative session (1925-26))	Chehalis County
20th (1927-1928)	William H. Kirkman (R)	Adams, Franklin, and Walla Walla (part)	Ed Davis (R)	Chehalis County
21st (1929-1930)	Charles F. Stinson (R)	Adams, Franklin, and Walla Walla (part)	Ed Davis (R)	Chehalis County
22nd (1931-1932)	Charles F. Stinson (R)	Adams, Franklin, and Walla Walla (part)	Ed Davis (R)	Chehalis County

=== 1933-Present ===
After the passage of Initiative 57 and the 1930 redistricting cycle, the state senate and state house districts were geographically similar. While some senate districts would occasionally be broken up into house seats A and B, seats A and B were always contained in the Senate district boundaries.

The 10th Legislative district's state senate and house seats are identical geographically from 1933 to the present day.

Year	Senate	House		District Geography
Year	Senator	House Position 1	House Position 2	District Geography
23rd (1933-1934)	Arthur E. Cox (R) (Note: Resigned prior to the 24th legislative session.)	Earl W. Benson (R)	Edwin L. Brunton (R)	Walla Walla County
24th (1935-1936)	Edwin L. Brunton (R) (Note: Appointed 1935 to serve unexpired term)	Henry J. Copeland (R) (Note: Appointed by Walla Walla County Commissioners)	Leland Richmond (D)	Walla Walla County
25th (1937-1938)	Henry J. Copeland (R)	Charles B. Auker (R)	C. N. Eaton (R)	Walla Walla County
26th (1939-1940)	Henry J. Copeland (R)	C. N. Eaton (R)	C. Wayne Swegle (D)	Walla Walla County
27th (1941-1942)	Henry J. Copeland (R)	C. N. Eaton (R)	Milton R. Loney (R)	Walla Walla County
28th (1943-1944)	Henry J. Copeland (R)	C. N. Eaton (R)	Milton R. Loney (R)	Walla Walla County
29th (1945-1946)	Henry J. Copeland (R)	C. N. Eaton (R)	Milton R. Loney (R)	Walla Walla County
30th (1947-1948)	Henry J. Copeland (R)	C. N. Eaton (R)	Milton R. Loney (R)	Walla Walla County
31st (1949-1950)	Henry J. Copeland (R)	Arthur A. Bergevin (D)	James D. Stonecipher (R)	Walla Walla County
32nd (1951-1952)	Henry J. Copeland (R)	Milton R. Loney (R)	James D. Stonecipher (R)	Walla Walla County
33rd (1953-1954)	Henry J. Copeland (R)	Milton R. Loney (R)	Lester L. Robison (R)	Walla Walla County
34th (1955-1956)	Henry J. Copeland (R)	Milton R. Loney (R)	Lester L. Robison (R)	Walla Walla County
35th (1957-1958)	Herbert H. Freise (R)	H. Maurice Ahlquist (R)	Thomas L. Copeland (R)	Walla Walla County
36th (1959-1960)	Herbert H. Freise (R)	H. Maurice Ahlquist (R)	Thomas L. Copeland (R)	Walla Walla County
37th (1961-1962)	Herbert H. Freise (R)	H. Maurice Ahlquist (R)	Thomas L. Copeland (R)	Walla Walla County
38th (1963-1964)	Herbert H. Freise (R)	H. Maurice Ahlquist (R)	Thomas L. Copeland (R)	Walla Walla County
39th (1965-1966)	Herbert H. Freise (R)	H. Maurice Ahlquist (R)	Thomas L. Copeland (R)	Walla Walla County
40th (1967-1968)	Herbert H. Freise (R)	House District 11-A	House District 11-B	1965 Redistricting
40th (1967-1968)	Herbert H. Freise (R)	Thomas L. Copeland (R) (Note: Interim Speaker, 1970 Ex. Session, Speaker Pro Tempore)	Vaughn Hubbard (R)	District 11-A: Asotin, Columbia, Garfield and Walla Walla (part) District 11-B: Walla Walla (part) (Note: Combined, house districts 11-A and 11-B composed the 11th state senate district and included all of Walla Walla County.)
41st (1969-1970)	Hubert F. Donohue (D)	Thomas L. Copeland (R)	Vaughn Hubbard (R)	District 11-A: Asotin, Columbia, Garfield and Walla Walla (part) District 11-B: Walla Walla (part)
42nd (1971-1972)	Hubert F. Donohue (D)	Thomas L. Copeland (R)	Vaughn Hubbard (R)	District 11-A: Asotin, Columbia, Garfield and Walla Walla (part) District 11-B: Walla Walla (part)
43rd (1973-1974)	Gary Grant (D) (Note: Resigned Nov. 23, 1977; Elected to King County Council.)	House Position 1	House Position 2	1972 Redistricting
43rd (1973-1974)	Gary Grant (D)	Bud Shinpoch (D) (Note: Resigned house seat; Appointed Dec. 7, 1977; Elected Nov. 1978 to serve unexpired term in the state senate)	John A. Bagnariol (D) (Note: Elected Speaker of the House for the 45th and 46th legislative sessions (1977-80))	King County (part)
44th (1975-1976)	Gary Grant (D)	Bud Shinpoch (D)	John A. Bagnariol (D)	King County (part)
45th (1977-1978)	Gary Grant (D)	Bud Shinpoch (D)	John A. Bagnariol (D)	King County (part)
45th (1977-1978)	Bud Shinpoch (D)	Avery Garrett (D) (Note: Appointed Dec. 9, 1977 to serve unexpired term)	John A. Bagnariol (D)	King County (part)
46th (1979-1980)	Bud Shinpoch (D)	Avery Garrett (D)	John A. Bagnariol (D)	King County (part)
47th (1981-1982)	Bud Shinpoch (D)	Avery Garrett (D)	Michael E. Patrick (R)	King County (part)
48th (1983-1984)	Bud Shinpoch (D)	Avery Garrett (D)	Eugene V. Lux (D) (Note: Resigned house seat; Appointed May 31, 1988 to serve in the state senate)	King County (part)
49th (1985-1986)	Avery Garrett (D) (Note: Deceased Apr. 13, 1988)	June Leonard (D) (Note: Deceased Apr. 21, 1994)	Eugene V. Lux (D)	King County (part)
50th (1987-1988)	Avery Garrett (D)	June Leonard (D)	Eugene V. Lux (D)	King County (part)
50th (1987-1988)	Eugene V. Lux (D)	June Leonard (D)	Margarita Prentice (D) (Note: Appointed May 31, 1988 to serve unexpired term)	King County (part)
50th (1987-1988)	Leo K. Thorsness (R) (Note: Elected Nov. 8, 1988 to serve unexpired term)	June Leonard (D)	Margarita Prentice (D)	King County (part)
51st (1989-1990)	Leo K. Thorsness (R)	June Leonard (D)	Margarita Prentice (D)	King County (part)
52nd (1991-1992)	Leo K. Thorsness (R)	June Leonard (D)	Margarita Prentice (D)	King County (part)
53rd (1993-1994)	Margarita Prentice (D)	June Leonard (D)	Velma Veloria (D)	King County (part)
53rd (1993-1994)	Margarita Prentice (D)	Eileen Cody (D) (Note: Appointed May 31, 1994 to serve unexpired term)	Velma Veloria (D)	King County (part)
54th (1995-1996)	Margarita Prentice (D)	Eileen Cody (D)	Velma Veloria (D)	King County (part)
55th (1997-1998)	Margarita Prentice (D)	Eileen Cody (D)	Velma Veloria (D)	King County (part)
56th (1999-2000)	Margarita Prentice (D)	Eileen Cody (D)	Velma Veloria (D)	King County (part)
57th (2001-2002)	Margarita Prentice (D)	Eileen Cody (D)	Velma Veloria (D)	King County (part)
58th (2003-2004)	Margarita Prentice (D)	Zack Hudgins (D)	Velma Veloria (D)	King County (part)
59th (2005-2006)	Margarita Prentice (D)	Zack Hudgins (D)	Bob Hasegawa (D)	King County (part)
60th (2007-2008)	Margarita Prentice (D)	Zack Hudgins (D)	Bob Hasegawa (D)	King County (part)
61st (2009-2010)	Margarita Prentice (D)	Zack Hudgins (D)	Bob Hasegawa (D)	King County (part)
62nd (2011-2012)	Margarita Prentice (D)	Zack Hudgins (D)	Bob Hasegawa (D)	King County (part)
63rd (2013-2014)	Bob Hasegawa (D)	Zack Hudgins (D)	Steve Bergquist (D)	King County (part)
64th (2015-2016)	Bob Hasegawa (D)	Zack Hudgins (D)	Steve Bergquist (D)	King County (part)
65th (2017-2018)	Bob Hasegawa (D)	Zack Hudgins (D)	Steve Bergquist (D)	King County (part)
66th (2019-2020)	Bob Hasegawa (D)	Zack Hudgins (D)	Steve Bergquist (D)	King County (part)
67th (2021-2022)	Bob Hasegawa (D)	David Hackney (D)	Steve Bergquist (D)	King County (part)
68th (2023-2024)	Bob Hasegawa (D)	David Hackney (D)	Steve Bergquist (D)	King County (part)
69th (2025-2026)	Bob Hasegawa (D)	David Hackney (D)	Steve Bergquist (D)	King County (part)

== Key ==
Democratic (D)
Republican (R)
Silver Republican (SvR)

== See also ==
- Washington Redistricting Commission
- Washington State Legislature
- Washington State Senate
- Washington House of Representatives
- Washington (state) legislative districts
