= Eileen Cody =

American politician from Washington

Member of the Washington House of Representatives from the 34th district
- In office January 13, 2003 – January 9, 2023 Serving with Joe McDermott, Sharon Nelson, Joe Fitzgibbon
- Preceded by: Toni Lysen
- Succeeded by: Emily Alvarado

Member of the Washington House of Representatives from the 11th district
- In office May 31, 1994 – January 13, 2003 Serving with Velma Veloria
- Preceded by: June Leonard
- Succeeded by: Zack Hudgins

Personal details
- Born: January 5, 1954 (age 72) Jefferson, Iowa, U.S.
- Party: Democratic
- Spouse: Thomas "Tom" L. Mitchell
- Education: College of Saint Mary (ADN); Creighton University (BSN)
- Profession: Registered nurse

Eileen L. Cody (born January 5, 1954) is an American politician of the Democratic Party. She was a member of the Washington House of Representatives from 1994–2023. She represented the 11th legislative district from 1994–2003, and represented the 34th legislative district from 2003–2023.

== Career ==
Cody is a retired nurse who specialized in rehabilitation for patients with multiple sclerosis.

=== Washington State Legislature ===
Cody was appointed to the state house in 1994 after her predecessor June Leonard died on April 21, 1994. When Washington redistricted following the 2000 census, Cody switched districts and ran in the 34th district. During her time in the legislature, she served as the chair of the House Health Care & Welfare committee.

In 2004, the Washington chapter of the American Nurses Association celebrated their accomplishment of having 8 registered nurses elected to the Washington legislature which was the largest number of nurses in any state legislature at the time. Alongside Cody, the other 7 nurses in the legislature at the time were Sen. Rosa Franklin (D-29), Sen. Margarita Prentice (D-11), Sen. Rosemary McAuliffe (D-1), Sen. Cheryl Pflug (R-5), Rep. Dawn Morrell (D-25), Rep. Judy Clibborn (D-41), and Rep. Tami Green (D-28). By 2020, Cody was the only remaining registered nurse in the legislature and left the legislature with no registered nurses after her retirement.

When Cody announced she would not seek reelection in 2022, she had been serving in the legislature for 28 years and was the longest serving active member of the legislature.
