= Green Party of Washington State =

Washington State affiliate of the Green Party

- Headquarters: PO Box 70493, Seattle WA 98127
- Ideology: Green politics
- Political position: Left-wing
- National affiliation: Green Party of the United States
- Colors: Green

Website
- https://greenpartywashington.org/

The Green Party of Washington State (GPWA) is the state party organization for Washington affiliated with the Green Party of the United States. As of 2017, GPWA has 9 affiliated local parties with at-large members and numerous locals in formation throughout the state. In 2010, party members met to formally reconstitute the party. Since that time the Green Party of Washington Coordinating Council has been working to promote growth of the party to improve grassroots democracy in Washington State and the U.S. in support of the Green Party's Four Pillars and Ten Key Values while offering voters a non-corporate-controlled alternative to the current two-party political system.

== Candidates ==
In 1998, during the Green Party of Seattle's first year of existence, two members were elected to the Seattle City Council.

In 2001, Washington Republicans recruited and assisted several people to run as Green Party of Washington candidates for local office.

In 2008 Duff Badgley from Seattle ran as a Green Party member for Washington State Governor and Garry Muuell from Hoquiam ran in CD 6 for US House of Representatives.

In 2010, Howard A. Pellett from Anacortes ran for State Senator in LD 40. He also previously ran twice for Skagit County Commissioner and twice for Skagit County Representative and for many years he was President of the Skagit County Green Party.

In 2010, Roy Olson from Olympia ran for CD 9 US Representative.

In 2012, Howard A. Pellet from Anacortes again ran for State Senatator in LD 40.

In 2014, Bob Lewis, a union activist and grocery store manager from the Puget Sound region, ran for District 21, position 2 of the Washington House of Representatives. He finished in 4th place in the Top Two primary.

In 2014, Douglas Milholland ran for CD 6 for the US House of Representatives.

In 2024, Andre Stackhouse, a universal healthcare advocate and executive director of Whole Washington, ran for Governor of Washington and was endorsed by the Green Party of Washington.

=== Presidential nominee results ===
Since 1996, the Green Party of Washington State has placed the nominee of the Green Party of the United States on the statewide presidential ballot. The highest vote total came in 2000, when Ralph Nader received over 103,000 votes. The lowest vote total came in 2004, when David Cobb was the nominee. His campaign received only 2,974 votes.

Year	Nominee	Votes
1996	Ralph Nader	60,322 (2.68%)
2000	Ralph Nader	103,002 (4.14%)
2004	David Cobb	2,974 (0.10%)
2008	Cynthia McKinney	3,819 (0.13%)
2012	Jill Stein	20,928 (0.67%)
2016	Jill Stein	51,066 (1.7%)
2020	Howie Hawkins	18,289 (0.45%)
