= Single-payer healthcare =

System of health care

Single-payer healthcare is a type of universal healthcare, in which the costs of essential healthcare for all residents are covered by a single public system (hence "single-payer"). Single-payer systems may contract for healthcare services from private organizations (as is the case in Canada) or may own and employ healthcare resources and personnel (as is the case in the United Kingdom). "Single-payer" describes the mechanism by which healthcare is paid for by a single public authority, not a private authority, nor a mix of both.

== Description ==
Within single-payer healthcare systems, a single government or government-related source pays for all covered healthcare services. In 2010, the World Health Organization's member countries adopted universal healthcare as a goal; this goal was also adopted by the United Nations General Assembly in 2015 as part of the 2030 Agenda for Sustainable Development.

A single-payer health system establishes a single risk pool, consisting of the entire population of a geographic or political region. It also establishes a single set of rules for health care rationing, services offered, reimbursement rates, drug prices, and minimum standards for required services. Health care rationing can include cost–utility analysis and waiting lists.

In wealthy nations, single-payer healthcare is typically available to all citizens. Examples include the United Kingdom's National Health Service, Australia's Medicare, Canada's Medicare, Spain's National Health System, Taiwan's National Health Insurance and Italy's National Health System (SSN Servizio Sanitario Nazionale).

=== History of the term ===
The term was coined in the 1990s to characterize the differences between the Canadian healthcare system with those such as the United Kingdom's NHS. In the Canadian healthcare system, the government pays private agencies to provide healthcare for qualifying individuals. In other systems, the government both funds and delivers care.

Typically, "single-payer healthcare" refers to health insurance provided as a public service and offered to citizens and legal residents; it does not usually refer to delivery of healthcare services. The fund can be managed by the government directly or as a publicly owned and regulated agency. Single-payer contrasts with other funding mechanisms like "multi-payer" (multiple public and/or private sources), "two-tiered" (defined either as a public source with the option to use qualifying private coverage as a substitute, or as a public source for catastrophic care backed by private insurance for common medical care), and "insurance mandate" (citizens are required to buy private insurance which meets a national standard and which is generally subsidized). Some systems combine elements of these four funding mechanisms.

In contrast to the standard usage of the term, some writers describe all publicly administered systems as "single-payer plans", and others have described any system of healthcare which intends to cover the entire population, such as voucher plans, as "single-payer plans", although these usages generally do not meet strict definitions of the term.

== Regions with single-payer systems ==
Several nations worldwide have single-payer health insurance programs. These programs generally provide some form of universal health care, which is implemented in a variety of ways. In some cases doctors are employed and hospitals are run by the government, such as in the UK or Spain. Alternatively, the government may purchase healthcare services from outside organizations, such as the approach taken in Canada.

=== Canada ===
Healthcare in Canada is delivered through a publicly funded health care system, which is mostly free at the point of use and has most services provided by private entities. The system was established by the provisions of the Canada Health Act of 1984. The government assures the quality of care through federal standards. The government does not participate in day-to-day care or collect any information about an individual's health, which remains confidential between a person and their physician.

Canada's provincially based Medicare systems show administrative simplicity, every doctor handles the insurance claim against the provincial insurer. There is no need for the person who accesses healthcare to be involved in billing and reclaim.

In general, costs are paid through funding from income taxes. A health card is issued by the Provincial Ministry of Health to each individual who enrolls for the program and everyone receives the same level of care.

There is no need for a variety of plans because virtually all essential basic care is covered, including maternity and infertility problems. Depending on the province, dental and vision care may not be covered but are often insured by employers through private companies. In some provinces, private supplemental plans are available for those who desire private rooms if they are hospitalized.

Cosmetic surgery and some forms of elective surgery are not considered essential care and are generally not covered. These can be paid out-of-pocket or through private insurers. Health coverage is not affected by loss or change of jobs, and there are no lifetime limits or exclusions for pre-existing conditions.

Pharmaceutical medications are covered by public funds, privately out-of-pocket or through employment-based private insurance. Drug prices are negotiated with suppliers by the federal government to control costs.

Family physicians (often known as general practitioners or GPs in Canada) are chosen by individuals. If a patient wishes to see a specialist or is counseled to see a specialist, a referral can be made by a GP.

Canadians do wait for some treatments and diagnostic services. The median wait time for diagnostic services such as MRI and CAT scans (Note: Diagnostic tests defined as the following: non-emergency magnetic resonance imaging (MRI) devices; computed tomography (CT or CAT) scans; and angiographies that use X-rays to examine the inner opening of blood-filled structures such as veins and arteries.) is two weeks, with 86.4% waiting less than three months. The median wait time for surgery is four weeks, with 82.2% waiting less than three months.

While physician income initially boomed after the implementation of a single-payer program, a reduction in physician salaries followed, which many feared would be a long-term result of government-run healthcare. However, by the beginning of the 21st century, medical professionals were again among Canada's top earners.

=== Taiwan ===
Healthcare in Taiwan is administered by the Department of Health of the Executive Yuan. As with other developed economies, Taiwanese people are well-nourished but face such health problems as chronic obesity and heart disease.

In 2002, Taiwan had nearly 1.6 physicians and 5.9 hospital beds per 1,000 population, and there were a total of 36 hospitals and 2,601 clinics in the island. Health expenditures constituted 5.8% of the GDP in 2001, 64.9% of which coming from public funds.

Despite the initial shock on Taiwan's economy from increased costs of expanded healthcare coverage, the single-payer system has provided protection from greater financial risks and has made healthcare more financially accessible for the population, resulting in a steady 70% public satisfaction rating.

The current healthcare system in Taiwan, known as National Health Insurance (NHI), was instituted in 1995. NHI is a single-payer compulsory social insurance plan which centralizes the disbursement of health care funds. The system promises equal access to health care for all citizens, and the population coverage had reached 99% by the end of 2004.

NHI is mainly financed through premiums, which are based on the payroll tax, and is supplemented with out-of-pocket payments and direct government funding. In the initial stage, fee-for-service predominated for both public and private providers. Most health providers operate in the private sector and form a competitive market on the health delivery side. However, many healthcare providers took advantage of the system by offering unnecessary services to a larger number of patients and then billing the government.

In the face of increasing loss and the need for cost containment, NHI changed the payment system from fee-for-service to a global budget, a kind of prospective payment system, in 2002. Taiwan's success with a single-payer health insurance program is owed, in part, to the country's human resources and the government's organizational skills, allowing for the effective and efficient management of the government-run health insurance program.

=== South Korea ===
South Korea used to have a multipayer social health insurance universal healthcare system, similar to systems used in countries like Japan and Germany, with healthcare societies providing coverage for the whole populace. Prior to 1977, the country had voluntary private health insurance, but reforms initiated in 1977 resulted in universal coverage by 1989. A major healthcare financing reform in 2000 merged all medical societies into the National Health Insurance Service. This new service became a single-payer healthcare system in 2004.

== Regions with "Beveridge Model" systems ==
=== Nordic countries ===
The Nordic countries are sometimes considered to have single-payer health care services, as opposed to single-payer national health care insurance like Taiwan or Canada. This is a form of the "Beveridge Model" of health care systems that features public health providers in addition to public health insurance.

The term "Scandinavian model" or "Nordic model" of health care systems has a few common features: largely public providers, limited private health coverage, and regionally-run, devolved systems with limited involvement from the central government. Due to this third characteristic, they can also be argued to be single-payer only on a regional level, or to be multi-payer systems, as opposed to the nationally run health coverage found in Taiwan and South Korea.

=== United Kingdom ===
Healthcare in the United Kingdom is a devolved matter, meaning that England, Scotland, Wales, and Northern Ireland all have their own system of private and publicly funded healthcare, generally referred to as the National Health Service (NHS). With largely public or government-owned providers, this also fits into the "Beveridge Model" of health care systems, sometimes considered to be single-payer, with relatively little private involvement compared to other universal systems. Each country's having different policies and priorities has resulted in a variety of differences existing between the systems. That said, each country provides public healthcare to all UK permanent residents that is free at the point of use, being paid for from general taxation.

In addition, each also has a private sector which is considerably smaller than its public equivalent, with provision of private healthcare acquired by means of private health insurance, funded as part of an employer funded healthcare scheme or paid directly by the customer, though provision can be restricted for those with conditions such as HIV/AIDS.

The individual systems are:

- England: National Health Service (NHS)
- Scotland: NHS Scotland
- Wales: NHS Wales
- Northern Ireland: Health and Social Care (HSC)

In England, funding from general taxation is channeled through NHS England, which is responsible for commissioning mainly specialist services and primary care, and Clinical Commissioning Groups (CCGs), which manage 60% of the budget and are responsible for commissioning health services for their local populations.

These commissioning bodies do not provide services themselves directly, but procure these from NHS Trusts and Foundation Trusts, as well as private, voluntary, and social enterprise sector providers.

== Regions with hybrid single-payer/private insurance systems ==
=== Australia ===
Healthcare in Australia is provided by both private and government institutions. Medicare is the publicly funded universal health care venture in Australia. It was instituted in 1984 and coexists with a private health system. For example, Medicare covers all of the cost for an Australian citizen in a public hospital, while it only covers 75% of the cost in a private hospital. Medicare is funded partly by a 2% income tax levy (with exceptions for low-income earners), but mostly out of general revenue. An additional levy of 1% is imposed on high-income earners without private health insurance.

As well as Medicare, there is a separate Pharmaceutical Benefits Scheme that considerably subsidises a range of prescription medications. The Minister for Health administers national health policy, elements of which (such as the operation of hospitals) are overseen by individual states.

=== India ===
India has a universal multi-payer health care model that is paid for by a combination of public and private health insurances along with the element of almost entirely tax-funded public hospitals. The public hospital system is essentially free for all Indian residents except for small, often symbolic co-payments in some services. At the federal level, a national health insurance program was launched in 2018 by the Government of India, called Ayushman Bharat. This aimed to cover the bottom 50% (500 million people) of the country's population working in the unorganized sector (enterprises having less than 10 employees) and offers them free treatment even at private hospitals. For people working in the organized sector (enterprises with more than 10 employees) and earning a monthly salary of up to Rs 21000 are covered by the social insurance scheme of Employees' State Insurance which entirely funds their healthcare (along with pension and unemployment benefits), both in public and private hospitals. People earning more than that amount are provided health insurance coverage by their employers through the many public or private insurance companies. As of 2020, 300 million Indians are covered by insurance bought from one of the public or private insurance companies by their employers as group or individual plans. Unemployed people without coverage are covered by the various state insurance schemes if they do not have the means to pay for it.

In 2019, the total net government spending on healthcare was $36 billion or 1.23% of its GDP. Since the country's independence, the public hospital system has been entirely funded through general taxation.

=== Israel ===
Healthcare in Israel is universal and participation in a medical insurance plan is compulsory. All Israeli residents are entitled to basic health care as a fundamental right. The Israeli healthcare system is based on the National Health Insurance Law of 1995, which mandates all citizens who are residents of the country to join one of four official health insurance organizations, known as Kupat Holim (קופת חולים - "Sick Funds") which are run as not-for-profit organizations and are prohibited by law from denying any Israeli resident membership. Israelis can increase their medical coverage and improve their options by purchasing private health insurance. In a survey of 48 countries in 2013, Israel's health system was ranked fourth in the world in terms of efficiency, and in 2014 it ranked seventh out of 51. In 2020, Israel's health system was ranked third most efficient in the world. In 2015, Israel was ranked sixth-healthiest country in the world by Bloomberg rankings and ranked eighth in terms of life expectancy.

=== Spain ===
Building upon less structured foundations, in 1963 the existence of a single-payer healthcare system in Spain was established by the Spanish government. The system was sustained by contributions from workers, and covered them and their dependents.

The universality of the system was established later in 1986. At the same time, management of public healthcare was delegated to the different autonomous communities in the country. While previously this was not the case, in 1997 it was established that public authorities can delegate management of publicly funded healthcare to private companies.

Additionally, in parallel to the single-payer healthcare system there are private insurers, which provide coverage for some private doctors and hospitals. Employers will sometimes offer private health insurance as a benefit, with 14.8% of the Spanish population being covered under private health insurance in 2013.

In 2000, the Spanish healthcare system was rated by the World Health Organization as the 7th best in the world.

Spain's healthcare system ranks 19th in Europe according to the 2018 Euro health consumer index.

=== United States ===
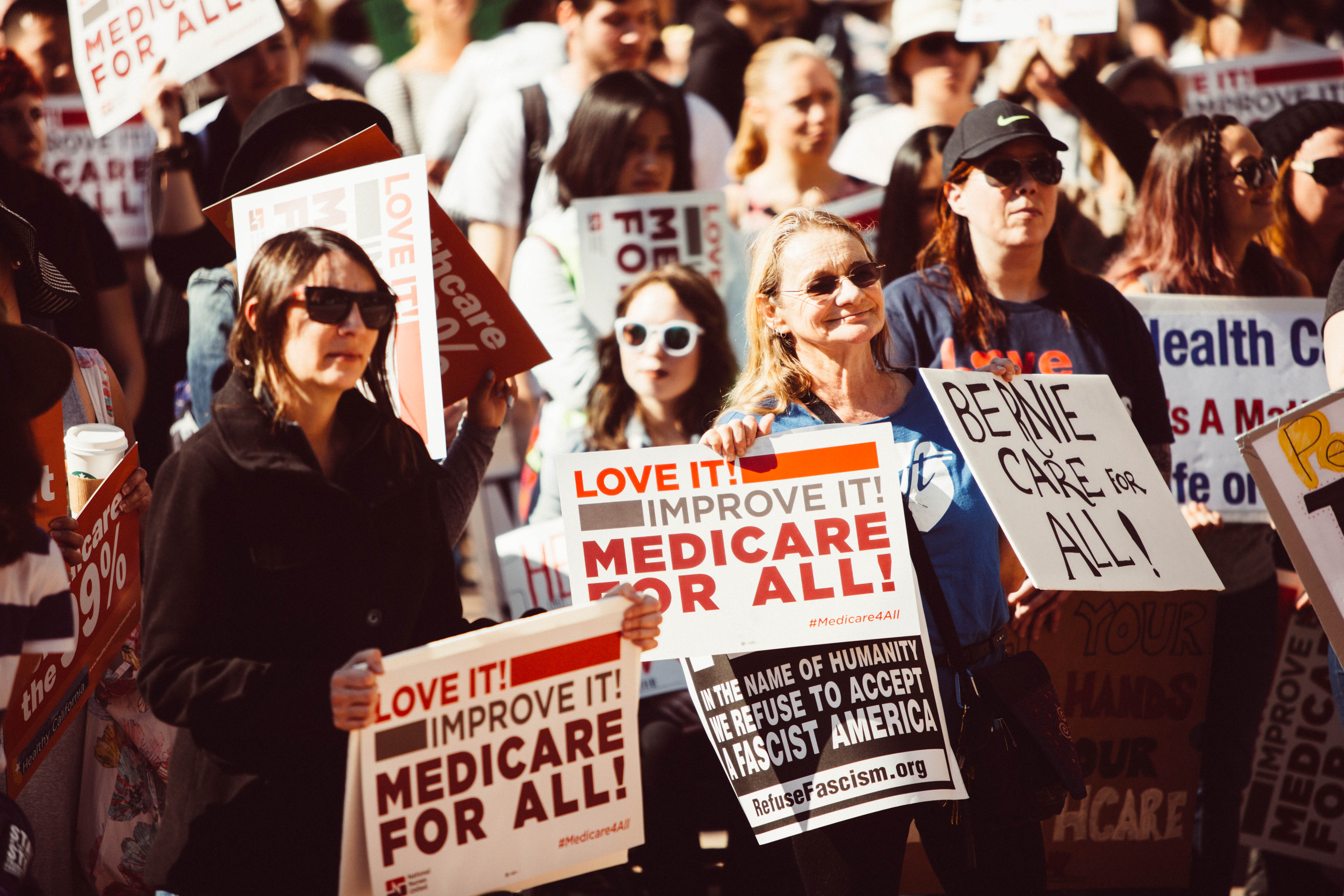
Rally for Medicare for All in Los Angeles in 2017

Medicare in the United States is a public healthcare system, but is restricted to persons age 65 and older, people under 65 who have specific disabilities, and anyone with end-stage renal disease. Several proposals for a universal single-payer healthcare system in the United States have been made. The Medicare for All Act was introduced in the House of Representatives in February 2003; it has been reintroduced several times. In July 2018, over 60 Democrats in United States House of Representatives announced the formation of a Medicare for All Caucus. On March 17, 2021, exactly a year after COVID-19 had appeared in every U.S. state, House Democrats introduced the Medicare for All Act of 2021 with 112 supporters.

Advocates argue that preventive healthcare expenditures can save several hundreds of billions of dollars per year because publicly funded universal healthcare would benefit employers and consumers, that employers would benefit from a bigger pool of potential customers and that employers would likely pay less, would be spared administrative costs, and inequities between employers would be reduced. Prohibitively high cost is the primary reason Americans give for problems accessing health care. At over 27 million, the number of people without health insurance coverage in the United States is one of the primary concerns raised by advocates of health care reform. Lack of health insurance is associated with increased mortality – about sixty thousand preventable deaths per year, depending on the study. A study done at Harvard Medical School with Cambridge Health Alliance showed that nearly 45,000 annual deaths are associated with a lack of patient health insurance. The study also found that uninsured, working Americans have a risk of death about 40% higher compared to privately insured working Americans.

Backers of single-payer or Medicare for All note that minorities and the poor, as well as rural residents in general, are less able to afford private health insurance, and that those who can must pay high deductibles and co-payments that threaten families with financial ruin. Advocates have estimated a long-term savings amounting to 40% of all national health expenditures due to the extended preventive health care, although estimates from the Congressional Budget Office and The New England Journal of Medicine have found that preventive care is more expensive due to increased utilization.

Any national system would be paid for in part through taxes replacing insurance premiums, but advocates also believe savings would be realized through preventive care and the elimination of insurance company overhead and hospital billing costs. A 2008 analysis of a single-payer bill by Physicians for a National Health Program estimated the immediate savings at $350 billion per year. The Commonwealth Fund believes that, if the United States adopted a universal health care system, the mortality rate would improve and the country would save approximately $570 billion a year.

==== National policies and proposals ====
Government is increasingly involved in U.S. health care spending, paying about 45% of the $2.2 trillion the nation spent on individuals' medical care in 2004. However, studies have shown that the publicly administered share of health spending in the U.S. may be closer to 60% as of 2002.

According to Princeton University health economist Uwe Reinhardt, U.S. Medicare, Medicaid, and State Children's Health Insurance Program (SCHIP) represent "forms of 'social insurance' coupled with a largely private health-care delivery system" rather than forms of "socialized medicine". In contrast, he describes the Veterans Administration healthcare system as a pure form of socialized medicine because it is "owned, operated and financed by government."

In a peer-reviewed paper published in the Annals of Internal Medicine, researchers of the RAND Corporation reported that the quality of care received by Veterans Administration patients scored significantly higher overall than did comparable metrics for patients currently using United States Medicare.

The Medicare for All Act is a perennial piece of legislation introduced many times in the United States House of Representatives by then Representative John Conyers (D-MI). The act would establish a universal single-payer health care system in the United States, the rough equivalent of Canada's Medicare, the United Kingdom's National Health Service, and Taiwan's Bureau of National Health Insurance, among other examples. The bill was first introduced in 2003 and has been reintroduced in each Congress since. During the 2009 health care debates over the bill that became the Patient Protection and Affordable Care Act, H.R. 676 was expected to be debated and voted upon by the House in September 2009, but was never debated. In the wake of Bernie Sanders' 2016 presidential campaign, in which a push for universal healthcare featured prominently, single-payer proposals gained traction. Conyers reintroduced his bill in the House of Representatives in January 2017. Four months later, the bill was supported by 112 co-sponsors, surpassing for the first time the 25% mark of co-sponsorship. In September of the same year, Sanders himself, together with 16 co-sponsors, introduced a Medicare-for-all bill in the Senate (S. 1804).

An analysis of a Mercatus Center study of the 2017 proposal by economist Jeffrey Sachs found that "it rightfully and straightforwardly concludes that M4A would provide more health care coverage at lower cost than the status quo, projecting a net reduction in national health expenditures of roughly $2 trillion over a 10-year period (2022-2031), while also enabling increased health care coverage." However, Mercatus scholar Robert Graboyes pointed out that the study had deliberately taken for granted the assumptions of the bill's advocates for the sake of argument: "If M4A yielded every benefit and saving Sanders foresees, how would federal government finances change?" He went on: "Sanders assumes we can slam doctors, nurses, hospitals, drug companies, and others with enormous pay cuts, and yet expect them to happily provide even more services and products than they do now. He also assumes federal bureaucrats … will be paragons of efficient management."

The Congressional Budget Office and related government agencies scored the cost of a single-payer health care system several times since 1991. The Government Accountability Office published a report in 1991 noting that "[I]f the US were to shift to a system of universal coverage and a single payer, as in Canada, the savings in administrative costs [10 percent of health spending] would be more than enough to offset the expense of universal coverage."

The CBO scored the cost in 1991, noting that "the population that is currently uninsured could be covered without dramatically increasing national spending on health" and that "all US residents might be covered by health insurance for roughly the current level of spending or even somewhat less, because of savings in administrative costs and lower payment rates for services used by the privately insured."

A CBO report in 1993 stated that "[t]he net cost of achieving universal insurance coverage under this single payer system would be negative" in part because "consumer payments for health would fall by $1,118 per capita, but taxes would have to increase by $1,261 per capita" in order to pay for the plan. A July 1993 scoring also resulted in positive outcomes, with the CBO stating that, "[a]s the program was phased in, the administrative savings from switching to a single-payer system would offset much of the increased demand for health care services.

Later, the cap on the growth of the national health budget would hold the rate of growth of spending below the baseline." The CBO also scored Sen. Paul Wellstone's American Health and Security Act of 1993 in December 1993, finding that "by year five (and in subsequent years) the new system would cost less than baseline."

A 2014 study published in the journal BMC Medical Services Research by James Kahn, et al., found that the actual administrative burden of health care in the United States was 27% of all national health expenditures. The study examined both direct costs charged by insurers for profit, administration and marketing but also the indirect burden placed on health care providers like hospitals, nursing homes and doctors for costs they incurred in working with private health insurers including contract negotiations, financial and clinical record-keeping (variable and idiosyncratic for each payer).

Kahn, et al. estimate that the added cost for the private insurer health system in the US was about $471 billion in 2012 compared to a single-payer system like Canada's. This represents just over 20% of the total national healthcare expenditure in 2012. Kahn asserts that this excess administrative cost will increase under the Affordable Care Act with its reliance on the provision of health coverage through a multi-payer system.

A February 2020 study published in The Lancet found that the proposed Medicare for All Act would save 68,000 lives and $450 billion in national healthcare expenditure annually. According to a 2022 study published in the Proceedings of the National Academy of Sciences of the United States of America, a single payer universal healthcare system would have saved 212,000 lives and averted over $100 billion in medical costs during the COVID-19 pandemic in the United States in 2020 alone. Roughly 16% of all COVID-19 deaths occurred in the US, despite having only 4% of the world's population.

==== State proposals ====
Several single-payer state referendums and bills from state legislatures have been proposed, but with the exception of Vermont, all have failed. In December 2014, Vermont canceled its plan for single-payer health care.

===== California =====
California attempted passage of a single-payer health system by initiative in 1994, as Proposition 186, which got 27% of the vote.

Multiple legislative proposals have been proposed in the state legislature, one of the earliest by Senator Nicholas Petris. The first successful passage of legislation through the California State Legislature, SB 840 or "The California Universal Healthcare Act" (authored by Sheila Kuehl), occurred in 2006 and again in 2008. Both times, Governor Arnold Schwarzenegger vetoed the bill. State Senator Mark Leno has reintroduced the bill in the legislative session afterwards.

On February 17, 2017, SB 562, which is also known as "The Healthy California Act" was introduced to the California State Senate. This bill is a $400 billion plan that was sponsored by the California Nurses Association to implement single-payer healthcare in California. Under this bill, which was co-authored by State Senators Ricardo Lara (D-Bell Gardens) and Toni Atkins (D-San Diego), Californians would have health coverage without having to pay any premiums, co-pays, or deductibles. Under this proposed bill, all California residents will be covered in the Healthy California Act SB 562 regardless of their immigration status. This bill will also include transient students that attend California institutions who purchased their healthcare program through the school. Services that will be covered by this bill will need to be determined as medically necessary by the patient's chosen health care provider. These services will range from preventive services to emergency services, in addition to prescription drugs services. SB 562 passed in the State Senate on June 1, 2017, with a vote of 23–14. When the bill was sent to the State Assembly, it was put on hold by Assembly Speaker Anthony Rendon, who expressed concern over financing.

According to SB 562, a Healthy California Trust Fund would be established to provide funding for the bill. Currently, states receive funding from the federal government for certain healthcare services such as Medicaid and Medicare. In addition to taxes, these funds would be pooled into the new trust fund and provide the sources of funding needed to implement The Healthy California Act. However, California must first obtain a waiver from the federal government which would allow California to pool all the money received from these federal programs into one central fund. A new bill, AB 1400, proposed by Assemblymember Ash Kalra in 2021, would have established single-payer healthcare in California under the name of CalCare. The bill was ultimately withdrawn by Kalra before a floor vote could be held on it in January 2022 because AB 1400 did not have the votes to pass if one was to be held.

In 2019, California Governor Gavin Newsom appointed a "Healthy California for All" (HCFA) commission to study the feasibility of adopting a universal health care system with unified financing, such as a single-payer system, in California.

===== Colorado =====
The Colorado State Health Care System Initiative, Amendment 69, was a citizen-initiated constitutional amendment proposal in November 2016 to vote on a single-payer healthcare system called ColoradoCare. The system would have been funded by a 10% payroll tax split 2:1 between employers and employees. This would have replaced the private health insurance premiums currently paid by employees and companies. It would have begun operating in 2019 and was estimated to require revenue of $38 billion annually (from the Federal government and payroll taxes) and provide coverage for all residents, with no deductibles.

The ballot measure was rejected by 79% of voters.

===== Connecticut =====
Four bills to study or establish a statewide single-payer health plan have been introduced in the Connecticut General Assembly since 2021: HB 5340 in 2021 and HB 5773 in 2025 to establish a single-payer health plan in Connecticut; and HB 7101 in 2025 and HB 5041 in 2026 to establish a commission to conduct an economic analysis of establishing a single-payer health plan. The first three proposals died in committee; the fourth has been tabled.

In 2025, State Representative Josh Elliott, who had previously introduced HB 5773, announced his candidacy for governor of connecticut in 2026, challenging incumbent Governor Ned Lamont on a platform that includes establishing universal healthcare. Lamont later announced his own plan for a single-payer healthcare system—called the "Connecticut option"—during his 2026 State of the Union address, proposing HB 5041 to establish a commission for studying a universal healthcare system.

===== Hawaii =====
In 2009, the Hawaii state legislature passed a single-payer healthcare bill that was vetoed by Republican Governor Linda Lingle. While the veto was overridden by the legislature, the bill was not implemented.

===== Illinois =====
In 2007, the Health Care for All Illinois Act was introduced and the Illinois House of Representatives' Health Availability Access Committee passed the single-payer bill favorably out of committee by an 8–4 vote. The legislation was eventually referred back to the House rules committee and not taken up again during that session.

===== Massachusetts =====
Massachusetts had passed a universal healthcare program in 1986, but budget constraints and partisan control of the legislature resulted in its repeal before the legislation could be enacted.

Question 4, a nonbinding referendum, was on the ballot in 14 state districts in November 2010, asking voters, "[S]hall the representative from this district be instructed to support legislation that would establish healthcare as a human right regardless of age, state of health or employment status, by creating a single payer health insurance system like Medicare that is comprehensive, cost effective, and publicly provided to all residents of Massachusetts?" The ballot question passed in all 14 districts that offered the question.

===== Maine =====
In June 2021 LD 1045 became law without the signature of Governor Janet Mills. The law would establish a board called the Maine Healthcare Board which would be tasked to design, implement, and maintain a state health insurance plan called the Maine Healthcare Plan which would cover all residents of the state of Maine. However, neither the board of the Maine Healthcare Plan have been created because they are contingent on the passage of the federal legislation H.R.3775, the State-Based Universal Health Care Act.

In 2020 Maine AllCare, a statewide chapter of Physicians for a National Health Program organized as a 501(c)(3), launched a 501(c)(4) called Maine Healthcare Action to run a statewide ballot initiative directing the legislature to establish a universal, publicly funded health care system that covers everyone in the state by 2024. The campaign needed 63,000 valid signatures from registered Maine voters to get on the 2022 ballot. The campaign was suspended in April 2022 after collecting more than 41,150 signatures from voters across all 16 counties in Maine. In a blogpost Maine Healthcare Action said the reason was that they were not on track to collect the needed signatures by the June deadline.

===== Minnesota =====
The Minnesota Health Act, which would establish a statewide single-payer health plan, has been presented to the Minnesota legislature regularly since 2009. The bill was passed out of both the Senate Health Housing and Family Security Committee and the Senate Commerce and Consumer Protection Committee in 2009, but the House version was ultimately tabled.

In 2010, the bill passed the Senate Judiciary Committee on a voice vote as well as the House Health Care & Human Services Policy and Oversight Committee. In 2011, the bill was introduced as a two-year bill in both the Senate and House, but did not progress. It has been introduced again in the 2013 session in both chambers.

===== Montana =====
In September 2011, Governor Brian Schweitzer announced his intention to seek a waiver from the federal government allowing Montana to set up a single-payer healthcare system. Governor Schweitzer was unable to implement single-payer health care in Montana, but did make moves to open government-run clinics, and in his final budget as governor, increased coverage for lower-income Montana residents.

===== New York =====
New York State has been attempting passage of the New York Health Act, which would establish a statewide single-payer health plan, since 1992. The New York Health Act passed the Assembly four times: once in 1992 and again in 2015, 2016, and 2017, but has not yet advanced through the Senate after referrals to the Health Committee. On all occasions, the legislation passed the Assembly by an almost two-to-one ratio of support.

===== Oregon =====
The state of Oregon attempted to pass single-payer healthcare via Oregon Ballot Measure 23 in 2002, and the measure was rejected by a significant majority.

===== Pennsylvania =====
The Family Business and Healthcare Security Act has been introduced in the Pennsylvania legislature numerous times, but has never been able to pass.

===== Vermont =====
Vermont passed legislation in 2011 creating Green Mountain Care. When Governor Peter Shumlin signed the bill into law, Vermont became the first state to functionally have a single-payer health care system. While the bill is considered a single-payer bill, private insurers can continue to operate in the state indefinitely, meaning it does not fit the strict definition of single-payer.

Representative Mark Larson, the initial sponsor of the bill, has described Green Mountain Care's provisions "as close as we can get [to single-payer] at the state level." Vermont abandoned the plan in 2014, citing costs and tax increases as too high to implement.

===== Washington =====
There have been multiple campaigns for statewide single payer in Washington state. In 2018 a 501(c)(4) called Whole Washington ran an initiative to the people (I-1600) for a statewide single payer plan called the Whole Washington Health Trust - they did not collect enough signatures to make it onto the ballot. Washington has also passed legislation to create a universal healthcare work group that is tasked with creating a statewide universal healthcare plan by 2026. In 2021, Senate Bill 5204, a legislative version of Whole Washington's ballot initiative, was introduced into the state legislature by Senator Bob Hasegawa. It has seven cosponsors, though it has never been introduced into the Washington House of Representatives.

==== Public opinion ====
Advocates for single-payer healthcare point out support in polls, although the polling is mixed depending on how the question is asked. Polls from Harvard University in 1988, the Los Angeles Times in 1990, and the Wall Street Journal in 1991 all showed strong support for a health care system comparable to the system in Canada.

A 2001 article in the public health journal Health Affairs studied fifty years of American public opinion of various health care plans and concluded that, while there appears to be general support of a "national health care plan", poll respondents "remain satisfied with their current medical arrangements, do not trust the federal government to do what is right, and do not favor a single-payer type of national health plan."

Between 2001 and 2013, however, polling support declined. A 2007 Yahoo/AP poll showed 54% of respondents considered themselves supporters of "single-payer health care", and 49% of respondents in a 2009 poll for Time magazine showed support for "a national single-payer plan similar to Medicare for all." Polls by Rasmussen Reports in 2011 and 2012 showed 49% opposed to single-payer healthcare. In April 2019, a Kaiser Family Foundation poll showed 56% of Americans favor "a national health plan, sometimes called Medicare-for-all", with support remaining steady over the previous two years.

A majority of Democratic Party voters support Medicare for all.

==== Advocacy groups ====
Physicians for a National Health Program, National Nurses United, the American Medical Student Association, Healthcare-NOW!, Public Citizen, and the California Nurses Association are among advocacy groups that have called for the introduction of a single-payer healthcare program in the United States.

A 2007 study published in the Annals of Internal Medicine found that 59% of physicians "supported legislation to establish national health insurance" while 9% were neutral on the topic, and 32% opposed it. In January 2020, The American College of Physicians endorsed the concept of single-payer system for the US and published a series of articles supporting this in the Annals of Internal Medicine.

== See also ==
- All-payer rate setting
- Global health
- Health care
- Health equity
- Health care reform debate in the United States
- International comparisons of health care systems – tabular comparisons of the US, Canada, and other countries not shown above
- National health insurance
- Public health insurance option ("the public option")
