= Bob Hasegawa =

American labor leader and politician

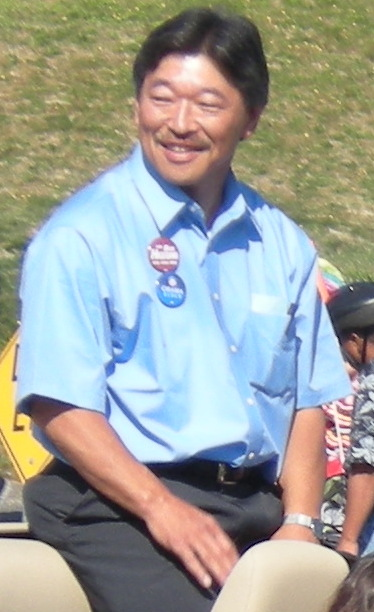

Member of the Washington State Senate from the 11th district
- Incumbent
- Assumed office January 14, 2013
- Preceded by: Margarita Prentice

Member of the Washington House of Representatives from the 11th district
- In office January 10, 2005 – January 14, 2013
- Preceded by: Velma Veloria
- Succeeded by: Steve Bergquist

Personal details
- Born: Robert Alan Hasegawa; September 22, 1952 (age 74) Seattle, Washington, U.S.
- Party: Democratic
- Education: Shoreline Community College (AA); Antioch University Seattle (BA); University of Washington (MPA)
- Website: Official

Robert Alan Hasegawa (born September 22, 1952) is an American labor leader and politician serving as a member of the Washington State Senate, representing the 11th Legislative District since January 2013. Hasegawa is a lifelong resident of Seattle's Beacon Hill. He previously served in the Washington State House of Representatives, and is retired from the Teamsters Union where he was a member and union leader for over 32 years.

== Early life and education ==
Bob Hasegawa grew up in Seattle, and lives in the Beacon Hill residence he grew up in. The son of Japanese immigrants, his parents, aunts, uncles, and grandparents were interned by the Federal government of the United States during World War II.

Graduating from Cleveland High School in 1970, Hasegawa studied physics at the University of Washington. He went on to graduate from Antioch University Seattle with dual concentrations in Labor Relations and Organizational and Social Change. Hasegawa also received a Master of Public Administration from the Daniel J. Evans School of Public Policy and Governance at the University of Washington. He holds an associate degree in labor studies from Shoreline Community College and studied information technology at Seattle Central Community College.

His daughter, Toshiko Grace Hasegawa, has served as an elected Commissioner on the Seattle Port Commission since 2022.

== Career ==
Hasegawa worked as a commercial truck driver, is a certified transport operator, and is a journey-level heavy construction equipment operator. He holds a Class A-Commercial Drivers License, with endorsements for hazardous material, doubles and triple trailer, tank cargo, non-air brake, and pilot car driving. He is also DHS and FAA certified for Seattle–Tacoma International Airport and Boeing Field.

=== Activism ===
Hasegawa is a longtime labor and social justice activist from Seattle. He was elected head of the largest Teamsters trucking local workers union in the Pacific Northwest (Teamsters Local 174) for three terms (nine years), and was also a leader in the national Teamsters pro-union democracy reform movement, TDU (Teamsters for a Democratic Union). He was an executive board member of the King County Labor Council, AFL-CIO representing the transportation trades. He was the first Asian American to run for International Vice President of the Teamsters Union, in 2001. On June 30, 2001, "Bob Hasegawa Day" was proclaimed in honor of his labor activism by Seattle Mayor Paul Schell and King County Executive Ron Sims. He received an award that was created in honor of the memory of Silme Domingo and Gene Viernes, labor activists who were killed opposing the regime of Ferdinand Marcos.

Hasegawa serves on the national executive board of the Asian Pacific American Labor Alliance, AFL-CIO (APALA) as well as on the APALA Seattle Chapter Executive Board, and has served on numerous other boards of community-based organizations.

=== Politics ===
Hasegawa ran to succeed Representative Velma Veloria in the Washington State House of Representatives in 2004. He defeated a crowded field of Democrats in the primary election, and went on to win the general election with almost two-thirds of the vote.

In early 2012, Hasegawa announced that he was running to succeed Margarita Prentice in the Washington State Senate. Hasegawa eventually won the November 6 election, and took office in January 2013.

Hasegawa announced in 2017 that he would run for mayor of Seattle. He received 8.4% of the vote in the primary election.

== Political positions ==
=== Healthcare ===
Hasegawa has advocated for universal public healthcare since running in his first election in 2004. In 2019 he introduced a legislative version of The Washington Health Trust, a statewide universal healthcare proposal originally introduced to the public by Whole Washington as a ballot initiative, into the Washington State Senate as SB.5222. In 2022 Hasegawa was the primary sponsor of SJM 8006 requesting a federal-state partnership towards the establishment of a universal single-payer healthcare both statewide in Washington and federally.

=== Housing ===
Homelessness and housing affordability are big issues in Seattle. Hasegawa has publicly stated his focus on increasing housing, investing in more public housing, and protecting renters. In the Senate, he has supported legislation designed to increase the amount of affordable rental housing. He co-sponsored legislation to increase funding for local homeless housing and assistance programs.

=== Taxes ===
Hasegawa has long criticized Washington's tax structure. As a mayoral candidate, he has publicized his opposition to the sweet-beverage tax voted on by the Seattle City Council, calling the tax "regressive." While he voted for the Sound Transit 3 package, Hasegawa has criticized Sound Transit. He has publicly expressed concerns about the effect the increased taxation of ST3 has on low-income residents.

In 2026, as state senator, Hasegawa cosponsored the SB 6346 “millionaire tax” bill, establishing Washington’s first income tax on annual income over $1 million.

=== State bank ===
Hasegawa has long been an advocate for public banking. He has repeatedly introduced legislation to create a state bank in Washington (the "Washington Investment Trust") that would be modeled after the Bank of North Dakota, which is the only current public bank in the United States. Proponents of public banking argue that such banks help stabilize economies, aid long-term growth, and help balance government budgets. He has publicly stated that it would reduce debt servicing costs, generate revenue, and increase the options the state and local jurisdictions have to finance infrastructure projects. A proposal for a municipal bank in Seattle is a component of Hasegawa's mayoral platform.

=== Affirmative action ===
Hasegawa supported Initiative-1000, a measure to re-legalize affirmative action in Washington, in the State Senate.

== Electoral history ==
=== 2024 ===
Washington's 11th Legislative District State Senate District, 2024
Primary election
Party	Candidate	Votes	%
Democratic	Bob Hasegawa (incumbent)	21,167	95.3
Write-in		1,046	4.7
Total votes		22,213	100.0
General election
Democratic	Bob Hasegawa (incumbent)	47,324	95.6
Write-in		2,168	4.4
Total votes		49,492	100.0

=== 2020 ===
Washington's 11th legislative district State Senate Election, 2020
Primary election
Party	Candidate	Votes	%
Democratic	Bob Hasegawa (incumbent)	29,869	100.0
Total votes		29,869	100.0
General election
Democratic	Bob Hasegawa (incumbent)	54,606	100.0
Total votes		54,606	100.0
Democratic hold			

=== 2016 ===
2016 Washington Senate Election, District 11
Party	Candidate	Votes	%
Democratic	Bob Hasegawa	38,785	76.36
Libertarian	Dennis Price	12,010	23.64
Total votes		50,795	100

=== 2012 ===
2012 Washington Senate Election, District 11
Party	Candidate	Votes	%
Democratic	Bob Hasegawa	34,301	69.34
Republican	Kristin Thompson	15,170	30.66
Total votes		49,471	100

=== 2010 ===
2010 Washington House of Representatives Election, District 11 Pos.2
Party	Candidate	Votes	%
Democratic	Bob Hasegawa	22,105	70.07
Republican	John Potter	9,442	29.93
Total votes		31,547	100

=== 2008 ===
2008 Washington House of Representatives Election, District 11 Pos.2
Party	Candidate	Votes	%
Democratic	Bob Hasegawa	29,289	73.92
Republican	John Potter	10,335	26.08
Total votes		39,624	100

=== 2006 ===
2006 Washington House of Representatives Election, District 11 Pos.2
Party	Candidate	Votes	%
Democratic	Bob Hasegawa	18,589	72.30
Republican	John Potter	7,123	27.70
Total votes		25,712	100

=== 2004 ===
2004 Washington House of Representatives Election, District 11 Pos.2
Party	Candidate	Votes	%
Democratic	Bob Hasegawa	25,714	66.32
Republican	Ruth Gibbs	13,058	33.68
Total votes		38,772	100

2004 Washington House of Representatives Election, District 11 Pos.2 Democratic Primary
Party	Candidate	Votes	%
Democratic	Bob Hasegawa	5,454	43.00
Democratic	Rosemary Quesenberry	5,235	41.27
Democratic	Ed Prince	1,359	10.71
Democratic	Marvin Rosete	636	5.01
Total votes		12,684	100
