= J. W. Morgan =

American politician (1843–1928)

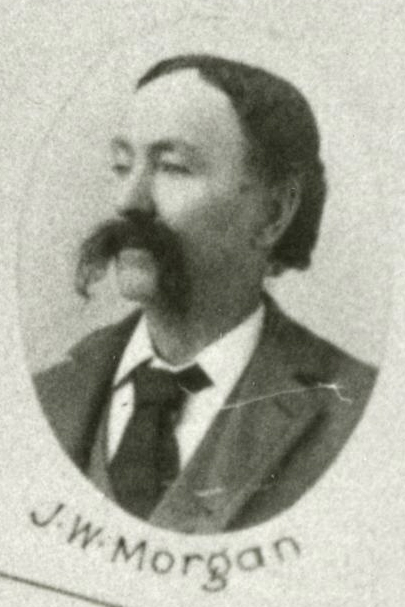
- Morgan in 1895

Member of the Washington House of Representatives for the 11th district
- In office 1895–1897

Personal details
- Born: January 1843 Pennsylvania, United States
- Died: July 13, 1928 (aged 85) Waitsburg, Washington, United States
- Party: Republican

James W. Morgan (January 1843 – July 13, 1928) was an American politician in the state of Washington. He served in the Washington House of Representatives from 1895 to 1897.
