= C. N. Eaton =

American politician

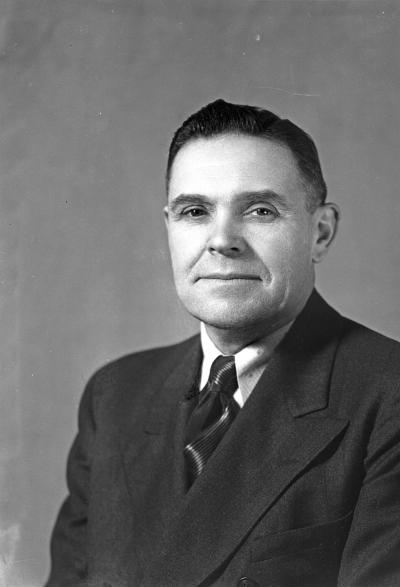
- Eaton in 1939

Member of the Washington House of Representatives for the 11th district
- In office 1937–1949

Personal details
- Born: August 8, 1887 Waitsburg, Washington, United States
- Died: September 13, 1978 (aged 91) Waitsburg, Washington, United States
- Party: Republican

Clarence Neace Eaton (August 8, 1887 – September 13, 1978) was an American politician in the state of Washington. He served in the Washington House of Representatives from 1937 to 1949.
