= Zack Hudgins =

American politician

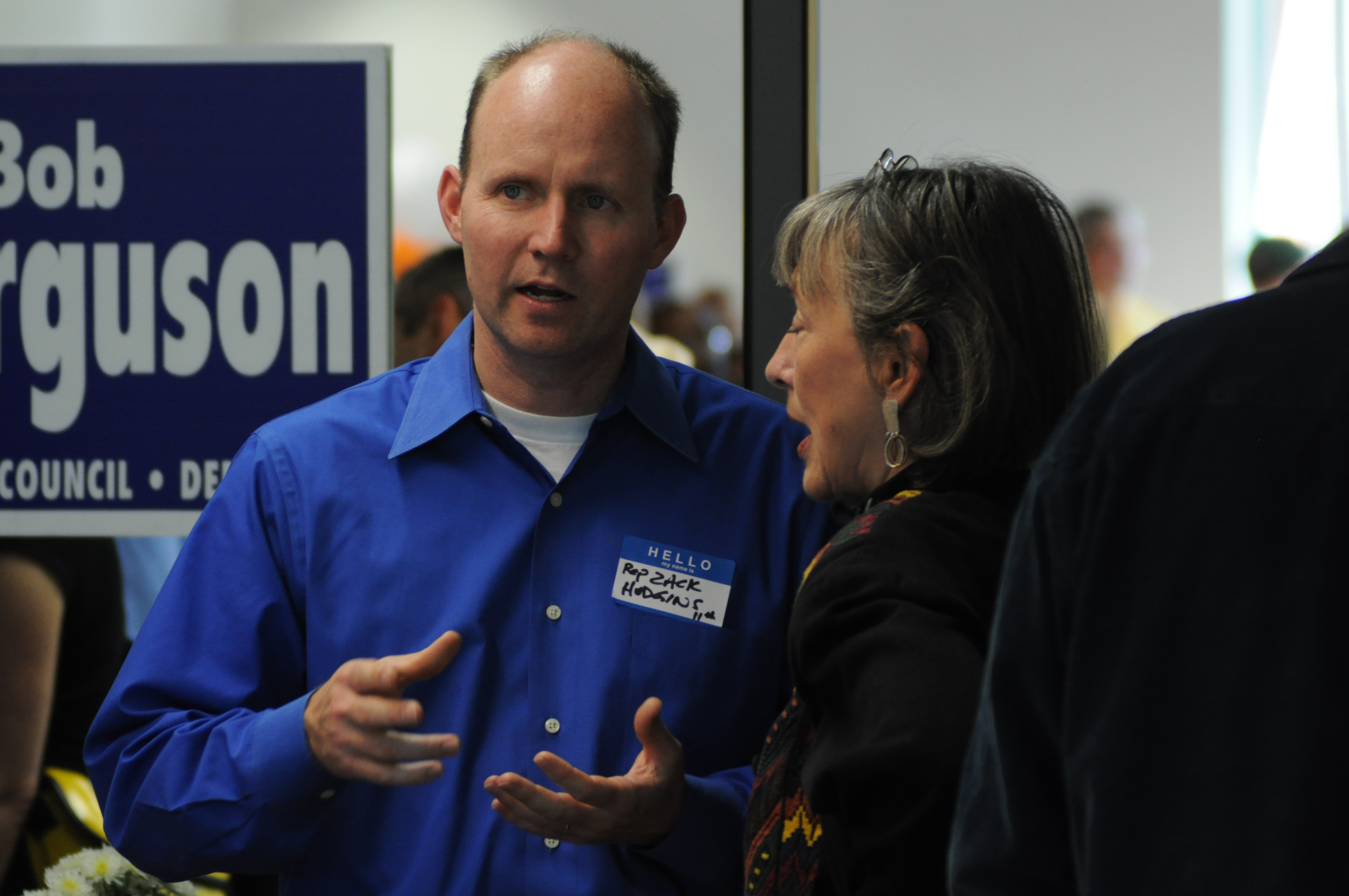

Member of the Washington House of Representatives from the 11th district
- In office January 13, 2003 – January 11, 2021
- Preceded by: Eileen Cody
- Succeeded by: David Hackney

Personal details
- Born: Zachary Lucas Hudgins; December 12, 1968 (age 57) Austin, Texas, U.S.
- Party: Democratic
- Spouse: Gabriela Juana Quintana
- Children: 1
- Education: University of Notre Dame (BA)
- Website: Official

Zachary Lucas Hudgins (born December 12, 1968) is an American politician who served as a member of the Washington House of Representatives for the 11th Legislative District from 2003 to 2021. His District included Renton, Tukwila and South Seattle.

== Early life and education ==
Born in Austin, Texas, Hudgins has a degree from the University of Notre Dame in Notre Dame, Indiana.

== Career ==
Prior to his career in politics, Hudgins worked at Amazon.com as a project manager and program manager with Microsoft. He has also worked as a campaign manager for various Democratic congressional candidates.

=== Politics ===
On November 1, 2011, Hudgins announced his candidacy for the office of the Secretary of State of Washington in the 2012 general election. On March 12, 2012, Hudgins withdrew from the race, focusing instead on running for an additional term representing the 11th District.

Zack Hudgins ran for the office of King County Director of Elections in 2015, losing to Julie Wise, the Deputy Director of the Department.

His committee assignments included Business & Financial Services, General Government Appropriations & Oversight (Chair) and Ways & Means. He is active in the Beacon Alliance of Neighbors and the SW King County Chamber of Commerce. He is also a member of the Greater Renton Chamber of Commerce and the Highlands Community Association. Hudgins has led seminars on democracy in the newly independent republics of Ukraine and Kyrgyzstan and in Iraq, with the National Democratic Institute.

He was defeated in the 2020 primary election by fellow Democrat David Hackney who criticized his moderate voting record.
