= Margarita Prentice =

American politician (1931–2019)

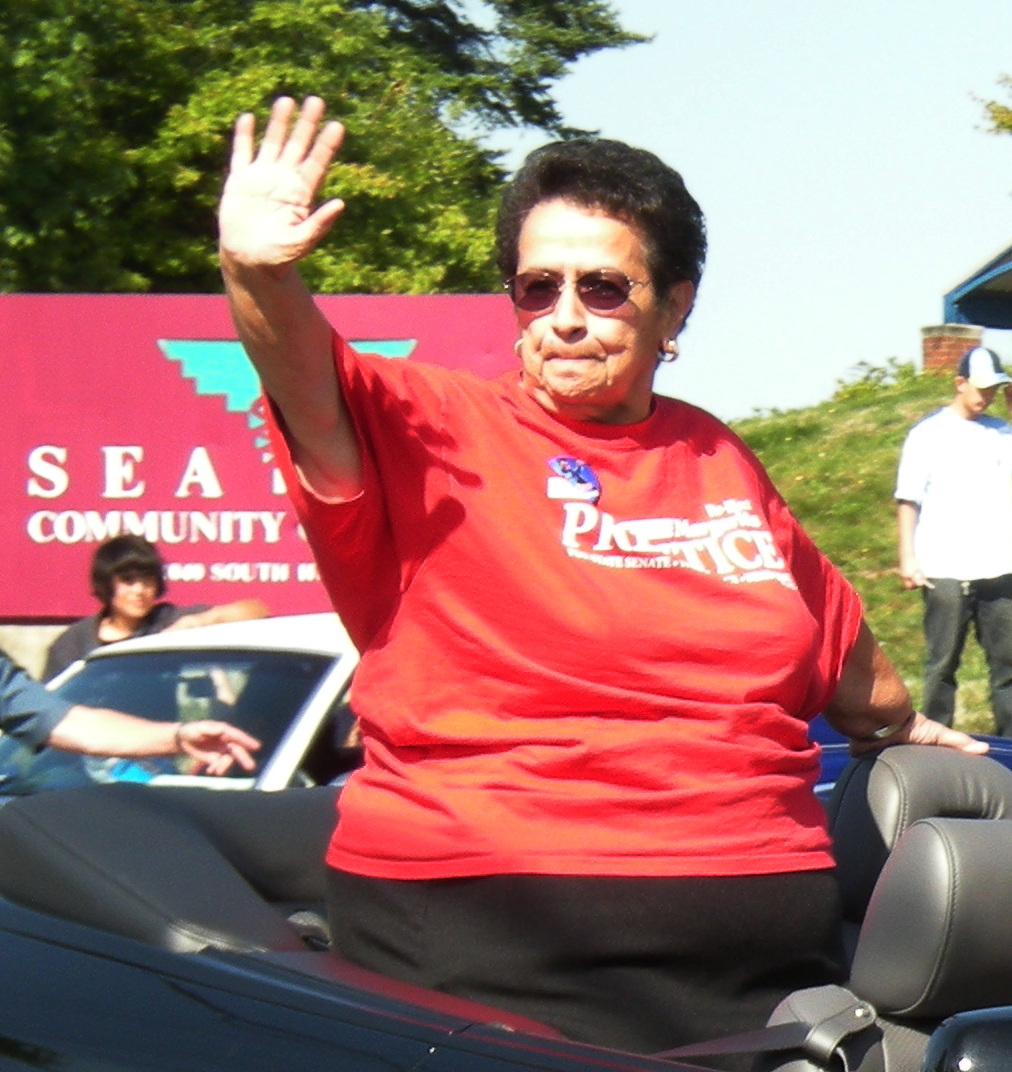
- Prentice during 2008 Fiestas Patrias parade, South Park, Seattle, Washington.

President pro tempore of the Washington Senate
- In office January 10, 2011 – December 10, 2012
- Preceded by: Rosa Franklin
- Succeeded by: Tim Sheldon

Member of the Washington Senate from the 11th district
- In office January 11, 1993 – January 14, 2013
- Preceded by: Leo K. Thorsness
- Succeeded by: Bob Hasegawa

Member of the Washington House of Representatives from the 11th district
- In office May 31, 1988 – January 11, 1993
- Preceded by: Eugene V. Lux
- Succeeded by: Velma R. Veloria

Personal details
- Born: Margarita López Prentice; February 22, 1931 San Bernardino, California, U.S.
- Died: April 2, 2019 (aged 88) Bryn Mawr, Washington, U.S.
- Party: Democratic
- Spouse: Bill
- Website: margaritaprentice.com

Margarita López Prentice (February 22, 1931 – April 2, 2019) was a Washington state legislator. A Democrat, she represented the 11th District, which includes Seattle's Beacon Hill, South Park and portions of Renton, Kent, Tukwila, Burien, and SeaTac.

== Early life ==
Prentice, who was of Mexican American descent, attended Phoenix College. She also attended Youngstown State University in Ohio. She was trained at St. Joseph's Hospital School of Nursing in Phoenix, Arizona and also attended the University of Washington.

== Public service ==
Prentice was elected to the Washington House of Representatives in 1988, taking office the following January. She served until 1992, when she was elected to the Washington State Senate, taking office in January 1993. Her final term ended in January 2013. Prentice was the current Chair of the Senate Ways and Means Committee. She was also the former chair and current member of the Senate Financial Institutions and Insurance Committee and serves on the Labor, Commerce, Research and Development Committee. Prentice also served as an ex-officio member of the Washington State Gambling Commission.

== Positions ==
=== Gambling ===
On June 7, 2006, legislation that Prentice pushed through made it illegal to gamble on-line in Washington state.

The legislation's implementation was delayed until courts ruled on its legality. A week before the law took practical effect, Dan "Wretchy" Martin won an on-line poker tournament and netted $160,000 for his efforts.

Mr. Martin has won more than $2 million playing poker on-line. Regarding Martin's statement's about the possibility of leaving his home state to pursue his life's dream and chosen profession, Sen. Prentice said:

"I just think some of these arguments are utter nonsense," Prentice told ESPN.com. "You mean you're going to move so you can play poker? Gee, lots of luck in your life. … I have nothing against card playing. That's fine. If you want to do that, but I'm sure not going to worry about someone … you know. Let them go pump gas."

=== Farm workers ===
==== Collective bargaining ====
In 1993, Prentice was a sponsor of SB 5347 to permit farm and agricultural workers to "self-organize, to join employee organizations, to bargain collectively and to engage in other lawful concerted activities for mutual aid and protection, or to refrain from such activities. . . ."

==== Temporary housing ====
In 1995, Prentice was a sponsor of SB 5503 which directed the Washington Department of Housing to begin reporting on the status of temporary worker housing conditions and to develop livable and decent temporary worker housing in Washington State. In 1998, she was a co-sponsor of SB 6168 which made "it easier and cheaper for farmers and others to construct seasonal housing for temporary workers." It also allocated $2 million to develop housing for low-income farm workers.

==== Extension of tax exemption laws ====
In 1997, Prentice was a sponsor of SB 5193. At the time, sales and use tax exemptions were only available to workers for housing provided by an employer. This legislation extended that exemption to agricultural employee housing provided by housing authorities, government agencies and non-profit agencies, provided that at least 80% of the occupants were agricultural employees with incomes less than 50% of the median income level. That legislation was passed by the Washington Legislature in a 138 to 4 vote. It became effective on May 20, 1997.

=== Anti-discrimination ===
In addition, Prentice worked to prohibit discrimination in housing, employment and insurance based on sexual orientation. In 2007, she prime-sponsored a bill extending retirement benefits to domestic partners.

=== Veterans' benefits ===
In 2007, Prentice prime-sponsored bills asking that the federal government to provide veterans' benefits owed to Filipino veterans. She was also the prime sponsor of a bill providing for the exclusion of veterans benefits from the income calculation for the retired person property tax relief program.

=== Sports arena in the 11th district ===
Prior to the Seattle SuperSonics departure from Seattle, Prentice supported funding a new sports complex that would have accommodated them, among others. Prentice explained her support of a proposal to locate a new arena in her district in a February 9, 2007 op-ed in the Seattle Times for "the economic activity the new center will bring to the region ... [and as a] valuable community asset that will create jobs and promote the development of new hotels and great restaurants." Prentice went on to contend that funding the new center would "have almost no impact on King County taxpayers, and no new general taxes [were] are even being considered to pay for the arena."

=== Financial institutions committee ===
==== Interstate bank branching ====
While the chair of the Senate Financial Institutions and Insurance Committee, Prentice sponsored the first bills in Interstate Bank Branching.

==== Federal share insurance for credit unions ====
Prentice also sponsored legislation transitioning credit unions to federal share insurance while serving as the chair of the Senate Financial Institutions Committee.

==== Payday lending ====
In 1995, Prentice and eight other members of the Senate Financial Institutions and Housing Committee were the first to sponsor legislation (SB 5279) regulating payday lending in Washington. According to the Washington State Legislature Final Bill Report on SB 5279, it was introduced because: "Short-term small loans serve a credit need in the community. . . . It is better to regulate the activity than to simply ignore it or prohibit it." This legislation was approved by the Washington Legislature in a 144 to 1 vote and became effective July 23, 1995. When the $15 fee per $100 borrowed on a two-week term is converted into an APR (annualized percentage rate) it is approximately 390%. News sources have reported on Prentice's opposition to attempts to cap the allowable fees on these loans to 36% APR.

== Campaign contributions ==
Prentice is a fund raising heavy hitter for herself and for the State Democratic party. August 2008 Washington Public Disclosure Commission records show that Prentice raised more than $231,000 in the 2008 election year reporting period.

In a series of articles attacking Prentice, the Seattle Stranger dubbed her "Senator MoneyTree" because of her acceptance of contributions from Moneytree, a financial services company founded and headquartered in her district. Washington State Public Disclosure Commission records as of August 19, 2008 indicate that there have been no Moneytree-related contributions to the Senator since 2004 and that in the past combined 10 years, Prentice accepted a total of $1,050 from Moneytree and/or its principals – less than half of one percent of contributions the Senator raised in the 2008 reporting period alone.

== Recognition ==
Throughout her legislative career, Prentice received recognition for her political and civic work. In 2006, she received the following honors:

- Outstanding Legislator by the Children's Alliance
- Legislator of the Year, Retail Association and Mortgage Brokers Association
- Legislator of the Year, Washington Health Care Association
- Legislator of the Year, Washington State Labor Council
- Legislator of the Year, Washington State Nurses Association
- Legislator of the Year, Home Health Care Association
- King County Nurse of the Year
- Champion of Health Care, Valley Medical Center
- Distinguished Service Award, Washington Association of Homes for the Aging
- Legislator of the Year, Washington State Dental Hygienists' Association

== Civic memberships and activities ==
Prentice is a member of various civic and political organizations including: American Civil Liberties Union, Amnesty International, Democratic National Committee, First Vice President of the Washington State Nurses Association for 1968–1972, Labor Officer of the Washington State Nurses Association for 1974–1978, Sierra Club, Renton Historical Society, Audubon Society, and Humane Society of United States.

== Personal life ==
Prentice attended Phoenix College; Youngstown State University, St. Joseph's Hospital School of Nursing in Phoenix and the University of Washington. A nurse for more than 20 years, she worked in various capacities, including hospital administrator and various assignments as a registered nurse. She also served as a member of the Renton school board.

She had three children and five grandchildren. Prentice died at the age of 88 at her home in Bryn Mawr on April 2, 2019.

== See also ==
- Washington State Legislature

Washington State Senate
Preceded by Rosa Franklin	President pro tempore of the Washington Senate; 2011–2012	Succeeded by Tim Sheldon
