= Milton R. Loney =

American politician

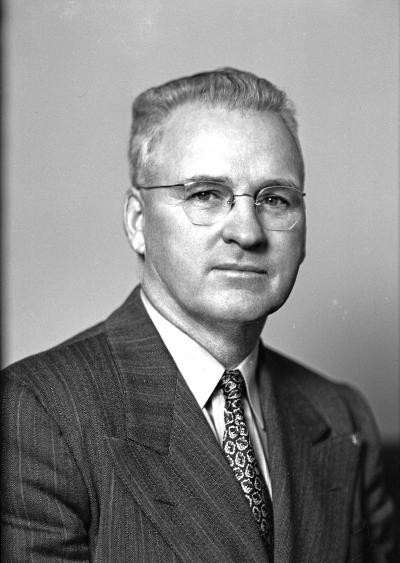
- Loney in 1947

Member of the Washington House of Representatives for the 11th district
- In office 1941–1957

Personal details
- Born: October 17, 1888 Pendleton, Oregon, United States
- Died: April 1, 1957 (aged 68) Walla Walla, Washington, United States
- Party: Republican

Milton R. Loney (October 17, 1888 – April 1, 1957) was an American politician in the state of Washington. He served Washington House of Representatives from 1941 to 1957.
