= David Hackney =

American politician from Washington

Member of the Washington House of Representatives from the 11th district
- Incumbent
- Assumed office January 11, 2021 Serving with Steve Bergquist
- Preceded by: Zack Hudgins

Personal details
- Born: George David Hackney; December 15, 1965 (age 60) Cleveland, Ohio, U.S.
- Party: Democratic
- Education: Cornell University (BA); Harvard University (JD, MPA)

George David Hackney (born December 15, 1965) is an American attorney and politician who is a member of the Washington House of Representatives from the 11th district. Elected in 2020, he assumed office on January 11, 2021.

== Early life and education ==
Hackney was born in Cleveland, Ohio and lived in five states as a child. Hackney earned a Bachelor of Arts degree from Cornell University, Juris Doctor from Harvard Law School, and Master of Public Administration from Harvard Kennedy School. He was a member of Delta Kappa Epsilon and played football his freshman year.

== Career ==
After graduating from law school, Hackney worked as an attorney and activist. Hackney served as a prosecutor for the United States Department of Justice in California and taught trial advocacy through the United Nations. He later worked in human resources and employee relations at Amazon.

Prior to his 2020 election, Hackney served on the Washington State Human Rights Commission. In the 2020 Democratic primary for District 11 of the Washington House of Representatives, Hackney defeated Democratic incumbent Zack Hudgins. He assumed office on January 11, 2021. A political progressive, Hackney criticized Hudgins' moderate voting record during the primary campaign.
