= Steve Bergquist =

American educator and politician from Washington State (born 1979)

Member of the Washington House of Representatives from the 11th district
- Incumbent
- Assumed office January 14, 2013 Serving with David Hackney
- Preceded by: Bob Hasegawa

Personal details
- Born: Steven Anton Bergquist; September 7, 1979 (age 46) Washington
- Party: Democratic
- Education: University of Washington (BA); Western Washington University (MAT)
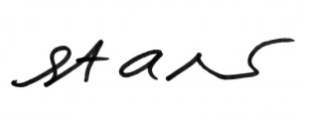
- Signature
- Website: Official

Steven Anton Bergquist (born September 7, 1979) is an American politician and educator serving as a member of the Washington House of Representatives from the 11th Legislative District.

== Education ==
Bergquist earned a Bachelor of Arts degree from the University of Washington, where he double-majored in political science and history. He then earned a Master of Arts in Teaching and social studies from Western Washington University.

== Career ==
After earning his master's degree, Bergquist worked as a teacher in Renton, Washington. Bergquist also operated a small business. He was first elected in to the Washington House of Representatives in 2012, succeeding Bob Hasegawa.

== Personal life ==
Bergquist and his wife, Avanti, have two children. Bergquist's wife works as a physician.
