= Velma Veloria =

American politician from Washington

Member of the Washington House of Representatives from the 11th district
- In office January 2003 – January 2004
- Succeeded by: Bob Hasegawa

Personal details
- Born: October 22, 1950 (age 75) Bani, Pangasinan, Philippines
- Spouse: Alonzo
- Education: San Francisco State College
- Occupation: Labor Activist, politician

Velma R. Veloria (born October 22, 1950) is a former politician from Washington. Veloria was the first Filipino American as well as the first Asian American woman to be elected to the Washington State Legislature as a member of Washington House of Representatives. She served from 1993 to 2004.

== Early life ==
On October 22, 1950, Veloria was born in Bani, Pangasinan, Philippines. In 1962, Veloria immigrated to the United States.

== Education ==
Veloria earned a Bachelor of Science degree in Medical Technology from San Francisco State College.

== Career ==
=== Labor activism in 1970s and 1980s ===
Veloria visited family in the Philippines during the dictatorship of Ferdinand Marcos. Some of her cousins were members of Imelda Marcos's Blue Ladies, but others were in the New People's Army, and they showed Veloria the conditions that impoverished Filipinos were living in.

Veloria decided to become an activist with Katipunan Ng Demokratikong Pilipino (KDP, the Union of Democratic Filipinos). She wanted to pressure the Marcos dictatorship by stopping U.S. support for it. During the 1970s and 1980s, Veloria was a labor activist in San Francisco, Seattle, and New York. She worked at the Office of Professional Employees International Union (OPEIU), ILWU Local 37 (cannery workers), and Service Employees' International Union (SEIU).

In 1981, the KDP asked her to work in Seattle because the city's unions had been going through a tumultuous reform movement. Seattle-linked Alaska cannery workers unions had been changing under the efforts of union activists like Gene Viernes and Silme Domingo. Viernes and Domingo were officers in the ILWU Local 37 as well as members of KDP, but they were assassinated for their work. Union leaders and reformers soon created the Committee for Justice for Domingo and Viernes to push the police to investigate their deaths. Although the murders had been framed as gang-related violence, the committee and KDP showed that they were politically tied to the Marcos dicatorship. Veloria joins the group while continuing reformer efforts to organize workers and protest the Marcos regime.

After the 1986 People Power Revolution was able to nonviolently force Marcos out of power, the KDP disbanded. Veloria joined Jesse Jackson's Rainbow Coalition in 1988, along with many other former KDP members.

=== Legislation in 1990s and 2000s ===
From 1990 to 1991, Veloria worked as a legislative aide to Art Wang who chaired the Finance Committee.

On November 3, 1992, Veloria won election to the Washington House of Representatives for District 11. In January 1993, Veloria became the first Asian-American woman and first Filipino American in that position. She served until 2004. With her election, she became the first Filipina in a state legislature in the continental U.S. Among Washington's five Asian-American state legislators at the time, Veloria, Gary Locke, Art Wang, Paul Shinn, and Stan Fleming, Veloria was the only woman.

Veloria introduced an anti-human trafficking bill in 2003 which made Washington the first state to criminalize the practice. She had been motivated to pass the bill after repeated murders of "mail-order brides" in the state. Veloria, Sutapa Basu, and other women's rights activists attended trainings by the Center for Women Policy Studies and led arguments for the bill's passage.

=== Advocacy ===
In 2019, the Filipino Community of Seattle and HumanGood Affordable Housing began constructing the Filipino Community Village, an affordable housing space and community center near Rainier Valley and Beacon Hill. The project took ten years to plan, and Veloria and Alma Kern were its co-chairs.

== Awards ==
- 2019 Curriculum and Community Innovation Scholar. First recipient. Faculty award honored at University of Washington.
- 2022 Lifetime Achievement Award from the Equity in Education Coalition.

== Personal life ==
Veloria's husband is Alonzo Suson. Veloria and her family live in Seattle, Washington.
