= 2010 Washington House of Representatives election =

Washington State House elections, 2010
- November 2, 2010

98 seats of the Washington State House of Representatives 50 seats needed for a majority
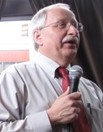

	Majority party	Minority party
Leader	Frank Chopp	Richard DeBolt
Party	Democratic	Republican
Leader's seat	43rd-Seattle	20th-Centralia
Last election	62	36
Seats before	61	37
Seats won	56	42
Seat change	▼5	▲5
Popular vote	2,141,975	2,359,589
Percentage	46.9%	51.6%
Swing	▼11.4%	▲11.0%
- Results: Republican gain Democratic hold Republican hold
House Speaker before election
Frank Chopp
Democratic
Elected House Speaker
Frank Chopp
Democratic

The Washington State House elections, 2010 had primaries held on August 17, 2010 and general elections held on November 2, 2010, determining who would represent each of the 49 Legislative Districts in the state of Washington in the Washington State House of Representatives. Representatives are elected for two-year terms.

The August 17, 2010, election determined which two candidates appeared on the November ballot. Each candidate was allowed to select a party preference, which was "not restricted to... an established major or minor party." Republicans gained five seats in this election, leading to a spread of 56 Democrats and 42 Republicans.

== Overview ==
=== Results ===
Washington State House Elections, 2010 Primary election — August 17, 2010
Party	Votes	Percentage	Candidates	Advancing to general	Seats contesting
Republican	1,675,307	51.39%	137	90	
Democratic	1,502,632	46.10%	133	80	
Independent	67,730	2.08%	21	5	
Conservative	6,713	0.21%	1	1	
Constitution	4,758	0.15%	1	0	
Green	2,666	0.08%	1	0	
Totals	3,259,806	100.00%	294	176	—

Washington State House Elections, 2010 General election — November 2, 2010
Party	Votes	Percentage	Seats	+/–
Republican	2,359,589	51.63%	41	▲4
Democratic	2,141,975	46.87%	57	▼4
Independent	58,691	1.28%	0	Steady
Constitution	9,736	0.21%	0	Steady
Totals	4,569,991	100.00%	98	—

=== Composition ===
Elections	Seats
Democratic Incumbent and Uncontested	6
Races w/ two Democrats in General	2
Republican Incumbent and Uncontested	12
Races w/ two Republicans in General	8
Contested, Open Seats	

== Predictions ==
Source	Ranking	As of
Governing	Lean D	November 1, 2010

== Election results ==
=== District 1 ===
Washington's 1st Legislative District House 1 primary election, 2010
Party	Candidate	Votes	%
Democratic	Derek Stanford	7,057	26.01
Republican	Dennis Richter	6,452	23.78
Democratic	Vince DeMiero	6,263	23.09
Republican	Sandy Guinn	6,144	22.65
Republican	Dick Lapinski	1,213	4.47
Invalid or blank votes			
Total votes		27,129	100.00
Turnout			

Washington's 1st Legislative District House 2 primary election, 2010
Party	Candidate	Votes	%
Republican	Heidi Munson	13,183	49.95
Democratic	Luis Moscoso	7,074	26.80
Democratic	Dave Griffin	6,135	23.25
Invalid or blank votes			
Total votes		26,392	100.00
Turnout			

Washington's 1st Legislative District House 1 general election, 2010
Party	Candidate	Votes	%
Democratic	Derek Stanford	29,181	53.20
Republican	Dennis Richter	25,672	46.80
Invalid or blank votes			
Total votes		54,853	100.00
Turnout			

Washington's 1st Legislative District House 2 general election, 2010
Party	Candidate	Votes	%
Democratic	Luis Moscoso	27,736	50.95
Republican	Heidi Munson	26,704	49.05
Invalid or blank votes			
Total votes		54,440	100.00
Turnout			

=== District 2 ===
Washington's 2nd Legislative District House 1 primary election, 2010
Party	Candidate	Votes	%
Republican	Representative Jim McCune	16,401	61.06
Democratic	Marilyn Rasmussen	10,460	38.94
Invalid or blank votes			
Total votes		26,861	100.00
Turnout			

Washington's 2nd Legislative District House 2 primary election, 2010
Party	Candidate	Votes	%
Republican	J.T. Wilcox	14,467	58.72
Republican	Representative Tom Campbell	10,172	41.28
Invalid or blank votes			
Total votes		24,639	100.00
Turnout			

Washington's 2nd Legislative District House 1 general election, 2010
Party	Candidate	Votes	%
Republican	Representative Jim McCune	31,459	58.99
Democratic	Marilyn Rasmussen	21,872	41.01
Invalid or blank votes			
Total votes		53,331	100.00
Turnout			

Washington's 2nd Legislative District House 2 general election, 2010
Party	Candidate	Votes	%
Republican	J.T. Wilcox	29,995	60.30
Republican	Representative Tom Campbell	19,751	39.70
Invalid or blank votes			
Total votes		49,746	100.00
Turnout			

=== District 3 ===
Washington's 3rd Legislative District House 1 primary election, 2010
Party	Candidate	Votes	%
Republican	Dave White (Note: Prefers G.O.P. Party)	6,030	31.57
Democratic	Andy Billig	5,894	30.86
Democratic	Bob Apple	3,894	20.39
Democratic	Louise Chadez	3,284	17.19
Invalid or blank votes			
Total votes		19,102	100.00
Turnout			

Washington's 3rd Legislative District House 2 primary election, 2010
Party	Candidate	Votes	%
Democratic	Representative Timm Ormsby	11,625	62.24
Republican	Morgan Oyler	5,876	31.46
	Hector E. Martinet	1,176	6.30
Invalid or blank votes			
Total votes		18,677	100.00
Turnout			

Washington's 3rd Legislative District House 1 general election, 2010
Party	Candidate	Votes	%
Democratic	Andy Billig	20,291	60.32
Republican	Dave White	13,348	39.68
Invalid or blank votes			
Total votes		33,639	100.00
Turnout			

Washington's 3rd Legislative District House 2 general election, 2010
Party	Candidate	Votes	%
Democratic	Representative Timm Ormsby	20,596	60.96
Republican	Morgan Oyler	13,189	39.04
Invalid or blank votes			
Total votes		33,785	100.00
Turnout			

=== District 4 ===
Washington's 4th Legislative District House 1 primary election, 2010
Party	Candidate	Votes	%
Republican	Representative Larry Crouse	24,974	100.00
Invalid or blank votes			
Total votes		24,974	100.00
Turnout			

Washington's 4th Legislative District House 2 primary election, 2010
Party	Candidate	Votes	%
Republican	Representative Matt Shea	24,709	100.00
Invalid or blank votes			
Total votes		24,709	100.00
Turnout			

Washington's 4th Legislative District House 1 general election, 2010
Party	Candidate	Votes	%
Republican	Representative Larry Crouse	43,339	100.00
Invalid or blank votes			
Total votes		43,339	100.00
Turnout			

Washington's 4th Legislative District House 2 general election, 2010
Party	Candidate	Votes	%
Republican	Representative Matt Shea	43,425	100.00
Invalid or blank votes			
Total votes		43,425	100.00
Turnout			

=== District 5 ===
Washington's 5th Legislative District House 1 primary election, 2010
Party	Candidate	Votes	%
Republican	Representative Jay Rodne	20,059	61.03
Democratic	Gregory Hoover	12,809	38.97
Invalid or blank votes			
Total votes		32,868	100.00
Turnout			

Washington's 5th Legislative District House 2 primary election, 2010
Party	Candidate	Votes	%
Republican	Representative Glenn Anderson	18,827	57.92
Democratic	David Spring	8,144	25.05
Democratic	Dean Willard	5,535	17.03
Invalid or blank votes			
Total votes		32,506	100.00
Turnout			

Washington's 5th Legislative District House 1 general election, 2010
Party	Candidate	Votes	%
Republican	Representative Jay Rodne	38,029	59.79
Democratic	Gregory Hoover	25,575	40.21
Invalid or blank votes			
Total votes		63,604	100.00
Turnout			

Washington's 5th Legislative District House 2 general election, 2010
Party	Candidate	Votes	%
Republican	Representative Glenn Anderson	36,170	57.34
Democratic	David Spring	26,907	42.66
Invalid or blank votes			
Total votes		63,077	100.00
Turnout			

=== District 6 ===
Washington's 6th Legislative District House 1 primary election, 2010
Party	Candidate	Votes	%
Republican	Representative Kevin Parker	27,882	100.00
Invalid or blank votes			
Total votes		27,882	100.00
Turnout			

Washington's 6th Legislative District House 2 primary election, 2010
Party	Candidate	Votes	%
Democratic	Representative John Driscoll	15,904	40.49
Republican	John Ahern	13,119	33.40
Republican	Shelly O'Quinn	10,258	26.11
Invalid or blank votes			
Total votes		39,281	100.00
Turnout			

Washington's 6th Legislative District House 1 general election, 2010
Party	Candidate	Votes	%
Republican	Representative Kevin Parker	45,650	100.00
Invalid or blank votes			
Total votes		45,650	100.00
Turnout			

Washington's 6th Legislative District House 2 general election, 2010
Party	Candidate	Votes	%
Republican	John Ahern	32,133	51.78
Democratic	Representative John Driscoll	29,923	48.22
Invalid or blank votes			
Total votes		62,056	100.00
Turnout			

=== District 7 ===
Washington's 7th Legislative District House 1 primary election, 2010
Party	Candidate	Votes	%
Republican	Representative Shelly Short	27,084	100.00
Invalid or blank votes			
Total votes		27,084	100.00
Turnout			

Washington's 7th Legislative District House 2 primary election, 2010
Party	Candidate	Votes	%
Republican	Representative Joel Kretz	27,477	100.00
Invalid or blank votes			
Total votes		27,477	100.00
Turnout			

Washington's 7th Legislative District House 1 general election, 2010
Party	Candidate	Votes	%
Republican	Representative Shelly Short	41,839	100.00
Invalid or blank votes			
Total votes		41,839	100.00
Turnout			

Washington's 7th Legislative District House 2 general election, 2010
Party	Candidate	Votes	%
Republican	Representative Joel Kretz	41,998	100.00
Invalid or blank votes			
Total votes		41,998	100.00
Turnout			

=== District 8 ===
Washington's 8th Legislative District House 1 primary election, 2010
Party	Candidate	Votes	%
Republican	Brad Klippert	20,223	64.75
Democratic	Carol L Moser	11,009	35.25
Invalid or blank votes			
Total votes		31,232	100.00
Turnout			

Washington's 8th Legislative District House 2 primary election, 2010
Party	Candidate	Votes	%
Republican	Representative Larry Haler	24,882	100.00
Invalid or blank votes			
Total votes		24,882	100.00
Turnout			

Washington's 8th Legislative District House 1 general election, 2010
Party	Candidate	Votes	%
Republican	Brad Klippert	32,555	61.32
Democratic	Carol L Moser	20,532	38.68
Invalid or blank votes			
Total votes		53,087	100.00
Turnout			

Washington's 8th Legislative District House 2 general election, 2010
Party	Candidate	Votes	%
Republican	Representative Larry Haler	43,092	100.00
Invalid or blank votes			
Total votes		43,092	100.00
Turnout			

=== District 9 ===
Washington's 9th Legislative District House 1 primary election, 2010
Party	Candidate	Votes	%
Republican	Representative Susan Fagan	20,771	100.00
Invalid or blank votes			
Total votes		20,771	100.00
Turnout			

Washington's 9th Legislative District House 2 primary election, 2010
Party	Candidate	Votes	%
Republican	Representative Joe Schmick	15,623	71.96
Republican	Glen R. Stockwell	6,089	28.04
Invalid or blank votes			
Total votes		21,712	100.00
Turnout			

Washington's 9th Legislative District House 1 general election, 2010
Party	Candidate	Votes	%
Republican	Representative Susan Fagan	33,864	100.00
Invalid or blank votes			
Total votes		33,864	100.00
Turnout			

Washington's 9th Legislative District House 2 general election, 2010
Party	Candidate	Votes	%
Republican	Representative Joe Schmick	29,056	77.83
Republican	Glen R. Stockwell	8,275	22.17
Invalid or blank votes			
Total votes		37,331	100.00
Turnout			

=== District 10 ===
Washington's 10th Legislative District House 1 primary election, 2010
Party	Candidate	Votes	%
Republican	Representative Norma Smith	27,511	96.99
Democratic	Laura Lewis (Note: Write-In)	853	3.01
Invalid or blank votes			
Total votes		28,364	100.00
Turnout			

Washington's 10th Legislative District House 2 primary election, 2010
Party	Candidate	Votes	%
Republican	Representative Barbara Bailey	23,153	60.88
Democratic	Tom Riggs	14,880	39.12
Invalid or blank votes			
Total votes		38,033	100.00
Turnout			

Washington's 10th Legislative District House 1 general election, 2010
Party	Candidate	Votes	%
Republican	Representative Norma Smith	36,190	60.58
Democratic	Laura Lewis	23,546	39.42
Invalid or blank votes			
Total votes		59,736	100.00
Turnout			

Washington's 10th Legislative District House 2 general election, 2010
Party	Candidate	Votes	%
Republican	Representative Barbara Bailey	34,700	57.95
Democratic	Tom Riggs	25,175	42.05
Invalid or blank votes			
Total votes		59,875	100.00
Turnout			

=== District 11 ===
Washington's 11th Legislative District House 1 primary election, 2010
Party	Candidate	Votes	%
Democratic	Representative Zack Hudgins	11,107	72.57
	Sarah Sanoy-Wright	4,199	27.43
Invalid or blank votes			
Total votes		15,306	100.00
Turnout			

Washington's 11th Legislative District House 2 primary election, 2010
Party	Candidate	Votes	%
Democratic	Representative Bob Hasegawa	10,765	65.02
Republican	John Potter	4,530	27.36
	Jackie Moore	1,261	7.62
Invalid or blank votes			
Total votes		16,556	100.00
Turnout			

Washington's 11th Legislative District House 1 general election, 2010
Party	Candidate	Votes	%
Democratic	Representative Zack Hudgins	22,189	73.49
	Sarah Sanoy-Wright	8,004	26.51
Invalid or blank votes			
Total votes		30,193	100.00
Turnout			

Washington's 11th Legislative District House 2 general election, 2010
Party	Candidate	Votes	%
Democratic	Representative Bob Hasegawa	22,105	70.07
Republican	John Potter	9,442	29.93
Invalid or blank votes			
Total votes		31,547	100.00
Turnout			

=== District 12 ===
Washington's 12th Legislative District House 1 primary election, 2010
Party	Candidate	Votes	%
Republican	Representative Cary Condotta	22,977	100.00
Invalid or blank votes			
Total votes		22,977	100.00
Turnout			

Washington's 12th Legislative District House 2 primary election, 2010
Party	Candidate	Votes	%
Republican	Representative Mike Armstrong	17,310	61.83
Republican	Cliff Courtney	10,684	38.17
Invalid or blank votes			
Total votes		27,994	100.00
Turnout			

Washington's 12th Legislative District House 1 general election, 2010
Party	Candidate	Votes	%
Republican	Representative Cary Condotta	35,630	100.00
Invalid or blank votes			
Total votes		35,630	100.00
Turnout			

Washington's 12th Legislative District House 2 general election, 2010
Party	Candidate	Votes	%
Republican	Representative Mike Armstrong	23,643	53.62
Republican	Cliff Courtney	20,448	46.38
Invalid or blank votes			
Total votes		44,091	100.00
Turnout			

=== District 13 ===
Washington's 13th Legislative District House 1 primary election, 2010
Party	Candidate	Votes	%
Republican	Representative Judith Warnick	21,764	100.00
Invalid or blank votes			
Total votes		21,764	100.00
Turnout			

Washington's 13th Legislative District House 2 primary election, 2010
Party	Candidate	Votes	%
Republican	Representative Bill Hinkle	22,140	88.65
Bull Moose Party	Anthony (El Tigrero) Novack	2,834	11.35
Invalid or blank votes			
Total votes		24,974	100.00
Turnout			

Washington's 13th Legislative District House 1 general election, 2010
Party	Candidate	Votes	%
Republican	Representative Judith Warnick	34,889	100.00
Invalid or blank votes			
Total votes		34,889	100.00
Turnout			

Washington's 13th Legislative District House 2 general election, 2010
Party	Candidate	Votes	%
Republican	Representative Bill Hinkle	34,923	85.06
Bull Moose Party	Anthony (El Tigrero) Novack	6,134	14.94
Invalid or blank votes			
Total votes		41,057	100.00
Turnout			

=== District 14 ===
Washington's 14th Legislative District House 1 primary election, 2010
Party	Candidate	Votes	%
Republican	Representative Norm Johnson	10,129	44.26
Republican	Michele Strobel	8,053	35.19
Democratic	Scott Brumback	4,702	20.55
Invalid or blank votes			
Total votes		22,884	100.00
Turnout			

Washington's 14th Legislative District House 2 primary election, 2010
Party	Candidate	Votes	%
Republican	Representative Charles Ross	18,784	100.00
Invalid or blank votes			
Total votes		18,784	100.00
Turnout			

Washington's 14th Legislative District House 1 general election, 2010
Party	Candidate	Votes	%
Republican	Representative Norm Johnson	19,044	52.50
Republican	Michele Strobel	17,229	47.50
Invalid or blank votes			
Total votes		36,273	100.00
Turnout			

Washington's 14th Legislative District House 2 general election, 2010
Party	Candidate	Votes	%
Republican	Representative Charles Ross	31,374	100.00
Invalid or blank votes			
Total votes		31,374	100.00
Turnout			

=== District 15 ===
Washington's 15th Legislative District House 1 primary election, 2010
Party	Candidate	Votes	%
Republican	Representative Bruce Chandler	12,999	68.48
Democratic	Paul Spencer	5,983	31.52
Invalid or blank votes			
Total votes		18,982	100.00
Turnout			

Washington's 15th Legislative District House 2 primary election, 2010
Party	Candidate	Votes	%
Republican	Representative David Taylor	12,485	66.78
Democratic	Thomas (Tom) T. Silva	6,210	33.22
Invalid or blank votes			
Total votes		18,695	100.00
Turnout			

Washington's 15th Legislative District House 1 general election, 2010
Party	Candidate	Votes	%
Republican	Representative Bruce Chandler	20,712	64.13
Democratic	Paul Spencer	11,585	35.87
Invalid or blank votes			
Total votes		32,297	100.00
Turnout			

Washington's 15th Legislative District House 2 general election, 2010
Party	Candidate	Votes	%
Republican	Representative David Taylor	19,951	62.50
Democratic	Thomas (Tom) T. Silva	11,970	37.50
Invalid or blank votes			
Total votes		31,921	100.00
Turnout			

=== District 16 ===
Washington's 16th Legislative District House 1 primary election, 2010
Party	Candidate	Votes	%
Republican	Representative Maureen Walsh	22,137	82.31
Constitution	Brenda High	4,758	17.69
Invalid or blank votes			
Total votes		26,895	100.00
Turnout			

Washington's 16th Legislative District House 2 primary election, 2010
Party	Candidate	Votes	%
Republican	Representative Terry Nealey	22,975	100.00
Invalid or blank votes			
Total votes		22,975	100.00
Turnout			

Washington's 16th Legislative District House 1 general election, 2010
Party	Candidate	Votes	%
Republican	Representative Maureen Walsh	33,793	77.63
Constitution	Brenda High	9,736	22.37
Invalid or blank votes			
Total votes		43,529	100.00
Turnout			

Washington's 16th Legislative District House 2 general election, 2010
Party	Candidate	Votes	%
Republican	Representative Terry Nealey	36,405	100.00
Invalid or blank votes			
Total votes		36,405	100.00
Turnout			

=== District 17 ===
Washington's 17th Legislative District House 1 primary election, 2010
Party	Candidate	Votes	%
Democratic	Representative Tim Probst	13,752	53.01
Republican	Brian Peck	12,188	46.99
Invalid or blank votes			
Total votes		25,940	100.00
Turnout			

Washington's 17th Legislative District House 2 primary election, 2010
Party	Candidate	Votes	%
Republican	Paul Harris	14,384	55.73
Democratic	Monica Stonier	8,473	32.83
Democratic	Martin (MD) Hash	2,952	11.44
Invalid or blank votes			
Total votes		25,809	100.00
Turnout			

Washington's 17th Legislative District House 1 general election, 2010
Party	Candidate	Votes	%
Democratic	Representative Tim Probst	26,298	53.18
Republican	Brian Peck	22,269	46.82
Invalid or blank votes			
Total votes		47,567	100.00
Turnout			

Washington's 17th Legislative District House 2 general election, 2010
Party	Candidate	Votes	%
Republican	Paul Harris	25,342	53.62
Democratic	Monica Stonier	21,924	46.38
Invalid or blank votes			
Total votes		47,266	100.00
Turnout			

=== District 18 ===
Washington's 18th Legislative District House 1 primary election, 2010
Party	Candidate	Votes	%
Democratic	Dennis Kampe	10,991	31.92
Republican	Ann Rivers	9,359	27.18
Republican	Jon Russell	7,718	22.41
Neither Party	Jon T. Haugen	2,333	6.78
Republican	Brandon Vick	2,033	5.90
Independent	Richard Carson	1,424	4.14
Republican	Anthony Bittner	575	1.67
Invalid or blank votes			
Total votes		34,433	100.00
Turnout			

Washington's 18th Legislative District House 2 primary election, 2010
Party	Candidate	Votes	%
Republican	Representative Ed Orcutt	26,161	100.00
Invalid or blank votes			
Total votes		26,161	100.00
Turnout			

Washington's 18th Legislative District House 1 general election, 2010
Party	Candidate	Votes	%
Republican	Ann Rivers	37,317	60.16
Democratic	Dennis Kampe	24,717	39.84
Invalid or blank votes			
Total votes		62,034	100.00
Turnout			

Washington's 18th Legislative District House 2 general election, 2010
Party	Candidate	Votes	%
Republican	Representative Ed Orcutt	47,595	100.00
Invalid or blank votes			
Total votes		47,595	100.00
Turnout			

=== District 19 ===
Washington's 19th Legislative District House 1 primary election, 2010
Party	Candidate	Votes	%
Democratic	Representative Dean Takko	16,110	56.61
Republican	Kurt Swanson	12,349	43.39
Invalid or blank votes			
Total votes		28,459	100.00
Turnout			

Washington's 19th Legislative District House 2 primary election, 2010
Party	Candidate	Votes	%
Democratic	Representative Brian Blake	15,615	55.81
Lower Taxes Party	Tim Sutinen	12,362	44.19
Invalid or blank votes			
Total votes		27,977	100.00
Turnout			

Washington's 19th Legislative District House 1 general election, 2010
Party	Candidate	Votes	%
Democratic	Representative Dean Takko	26,504	59.40
Republican	Kurt Swanson	18,118	40.60
Invalid or blank votes			
Total votes		44,622	100.00
Turnout			

Washington's 19th Legislative District House 2 general election, 2010
Party	Candidate	Votes	%
Democratic	Representative Brian Blake	23,354	52.42
Lower Taxes Party	Tim Sutinen	21,201	47.58
Invalid or blank votes			
Total votes		44,555	100.00
Turnout			

=== District 20 ===
Washington's 20th Legislative District House 1 primary election, 2010
Party	Candidate	Votes	%
Republican	Representative Richard DeBolt	21,984	65.85
Democratic	Corinne Tobeck	11,403	34.15
Invalid or blank votes			
Total votes		33,387	100.00
Turnout			

Washington's 20th Legislative District House 2 primary election, 2010
Party	Candidate	Votes	%
Republican	Representative Gary Alexander	26,121	100.00
Invalid or blank votes			
Total votes		26,121	100.00
Turnout			

Washington's 20th Legislative District House 1 general election, 2010
Party	Candidate	Votes	%
Republican	Representative Richard DeBolt	36,363	64.20
Democratic	Corinne Tobeck	20,278	35.80
Invalid or blank votes			
Total votes		56,641	100.00
Turnout			

Washington's 20th Legislative District House 2 general election, 2010
Party	Candidate	Votes	%
Republican	Representative Gary Alexander	44,715	100.00
Invalid or blank votes			
Total votes		44,715	100.00
Turnout			

=== District 21 ===
Washington's 21st Legislative District House 1 primary election, 2010
Party	Candidate	Votes	%
Democratic	Representative Mary Helen Roberts	14,779	56.75
Republican	Ed Borey	11,261	43.25
Invalid or blank votes			
Total votes		26,040	100.00
Turnout			

Washington's 21st Legislative District House 2 primary election, 2010
Party	Candidate	Votes	%
Democratic	Representative Marko Liias	12,891	50.17
Republican	Elizabeth Scott	8,403	32.70
Republican	Alan D. Tagle	3,185	12.40
SeniorSide Party	Mike Huisman	1,215	4.73
Invalid or blank votes			
Total votes		25,694	100.00
Turnout			

Washington's 21st Legislative District House 1 general election, 2010
Party	Candidate	Votes	%
Democratic	Representative Mary Helen Roberts	26,612	56.33
Republican	Ed Borey	20,633	43.67
Invalid or blank votes			
Total votes		47,245	100.00
Turnout			

Washington's 21st Legislative District House 2 general election, 2010
Party	Candidate	Votes	%
Democratic	Representative Marko Liias	25,491	54.22
Republican	Elizabeth Scott	21,519	45.78
Invalid or blank votes			
Total votes		47,010	100.00
Turnout			

=== District 22 ===
Washington's 22nd Legislative District House 1 primary election, 2010
Party	Candidate	Votes	%
Republican	Jason Hearn	11,796	34.28
Democratic	Chris Reykdal	9,322	27.09
Democratic	Stew Henderson	7,950	23.10
Democratic	Judi Hoefling	2,701	7.85
Democratic	Steve Robinson (Note: Prefers Progressive Democratic Party)	1,741	5.06
Democratic	Jeremy Miller (Note: Prefers Demo Party)	514	1.49
Democratic	F. G. (Fred) Jensen (Note: Prefers Prolife Democrat Party)	390	1.13
Invalid or blank votes			
Total votes		34,414	100.00
Turnout			

Washington's 22nd Legislative District House 2 primary election, 2010
Party	Candidate	Votes	%
Democratic	Representative Sam Hunt	20,559	63.19
No Party Preference	Chris Ward	9,001	27.67
Democratic	Justin Kover	2,975	9.14
Invalid or blank votes			
Total votes		32,535	100.00
Turnout			

Washington's 22nd Legislative District House 1 general election, 2010
Party	Candidate	Votes	%
Democratic	Chris Reykdal	34,600	60.71
Republican	Jason Hearn	22,392	39.29
Invalid or blank votes			
Total votes		56,992	100.00
Turnout			

Washington's 22nd Legislative District House 2 general election, 2010
Party	Candidate	Votes	%
Democratic	Representative Sam Hunt	39,261	71.89
No Party Preference	Chris Ward	15,351	28.11
Invalid or blank votes			
Total votes		54,612	100.00
Turnout			

=== District 23 ===
Washington's 23rd Legislative District House 1 primary election, 2010
Party	Candidate	Votes	%
Democratic	Representative Sherry Appleton	18,406	53.59
Republican	Pete DeBoer	15,943	46.41
Invalid or blank votes			
Total votes		34,349	100.00
Turnout			

Washington's 23rd Legislative District House 2 primary election, 2010
Party	Candidate	Votes	%
Democratic	Representative Christine Rolfes	19,003	56.13
Republican	James M. Olsen	11,211	33.11
Republican	Aaron Winters	3,642	10.76
Invalid or blank votes			
Total votes		33,856	100.00
Turnout			

Washington's 23rd Legislative District House 1 general election, 2010
Party	Candidate	Votes	%
Democratic	Representative Sherry Appleton	30,666	54.28
Republican	Pete DeBoer	25,829	45.72
Invalid or blank votes			
Total votes		56,495	100.00
Turnout			

Washington's 23rd Legislative District House 2 general election, 2010
Party	Candidate	Votes	%
Democratic	Representative Christine Rolfes	32,351	57.60
Republican	James M. Olsen	23,812	42.40
Invalid or blank votes			
Total votes		56,163	100.00
Turnout			

=== District 24 ===
Washington's 24th Legislative District House 1 primary election, 2010
Party	Candidate	Votes	%
Democratic	Representative Kevin Van De Wege	23,484	54.46
Republican	Dan Gase	11,754	27.26
Republican	Craig Durgan	7,887	18.29
Invalid or blank votes			
Total votes		43,125	100.00
Turnout			

Washington's 24th Legislative District House 2 primary election, 2010
Party	Candidate	Votes	%
Democratic	Steve Tharinger	15,940	37.66
Republican	Jim McEntire	15,852	37.46
Democratic	John (Jack) Dwyer	6,128	14.48
Republican	Larry Carter	4,402	10.4
Invalid or blank votes			
Total votes		42,322	100.00
Turnout			

Washington's 24th Legislative District House 1 general election, 2010
Party	Candidate	Votes	%
Democratic	Representative Kevin Van De Wege	34,977	56.18
Republican	Dan Gase	27,277	43.82
Invalid or blank votes			
Total votes		62,254	100.00
Turnout			

Washington's 24th Legislative District House 2 general election, 2010
Party	Candidate	Votes	%
Democratic	Steve Tharinger	32,300	52.33
Republican	Jim McEntire	29,427	47.67
Invalid or blank votes			
Total votes		61,727	100.00
Turnout			

=== District 25 ===
Washington's 25th Legislative District House 1 primary election, 2010
Party	Candidate	Votes	%
Republican	Representative Bruce Dammeier	16,281	64.88
Democratic	John Thompson	8,814	35.12
Invalid or blank votes			
Total votes		25,095	100.00
Turnout			

Washington's 25th Legislative District House 2 primary election, 2010
Party	Candidate	Votes	%
Democratic	Representative Dawn Morrell	10,287	40.29
Republican	Hans Zeiger	9,164	35.89
Republican	Steven Vermillion	4,044	15.84
Democratic	Ron Morehouse	1,247	4.88
Independent	Larry Johnson	548	2.15
Independent	Bryan Shaner	243	0.95
Invalid or blank votes			
Total votes		25,533	100.00
Turnout			

Washington's 25th Legislative District House 1 general election, 2010
Party	Candidate	Votes	%
Republican	Representative Bruce Dammeier	31,419	63.66
Democratic	John Thompson	17,935	36.34
Invalid or blank votes			
Total votes		49,354	100.00
Turnout			

Washington's 25th Legislative District House 2 general election, 2010
Party	Candidate	Votes	%
Republican	Hans Zeiger	24,919	50.05
Democratic	Representative Dawn Morrell	24,872	49.95
Invalid or blank votes			
Total votes		49,791	100.00
Turnout			

=== District 26 ===
Washington's 26th legislative district House 1 election, 2010
Party	Candidate	Votes	%
Republican	Representative Jan Angel	33,716	60.75
Democratic	Sumner Schoenike	21,785	39.25
Invalid or blank votes			
Total votes			100.00
Turnout			

Washington's 26th legislative district House 2 election, 2010
Party	Candidate	Votes	%
Democratic	Representative Larry Seaquist	28,942	52.17
Republican	Doug Richards	26,535	47.83
Invalid or blank votes			
Total votes			100.00
Turnout			

=== District 27 ===
Washington's 27th legislative district House 1 primary election, 2010
Party	Candidate	Votes	%
Democratic	Laurie Jinkins	6,818	32.9
Democratic	Jessica Smeall	1,259	6.08
Democratic	Janis (Gall-Martin) Gbalah	793	3.83
Democratic	Jake Fey	6,046	29.17
Independent	Ken Nichols	5,808	28.03
Invalid or blank votes			
Total votes			100.00
Turnout			

Washington's 27th legislative district House 2 primary election, 2010
Party	Candidate	Votes	%
Democratic	Representative Jeannie Darneille	11,415	54.41
Republican	Jon M. Higley	7,643	36.43
Democratic	Jon Cronk	1,921	9.16
Invalid or blank votes			
Total votes			100.00
Turnout			

Washington's 27th legislative district House 1 general election, 2010
Party	Candidate	Votes	%
Democratic	Laurie Jinkins	19,503	54
Democratic	Jake Fey	16,611	46
Invalid or blank votes			
Total votes			100.00
Turnout			

Washington's 27th legislative district House 2 election, 2010
Party	Candidate	Votes	%
Democratic	Representative Jeannie Darneille	24,296	62.85
Republican	Jon M. Higley	14,363	37.15
Invalid or blank votes			
Total votes			100.00
Turnout			

=== District 28 ===
Washington's 28th legislative district House 1 general election, 2010
Party	Candidate	Votes	%
Democratic	Representative Troy Kelley	21,347	52.87
Republican	Steve O'Ban	19,026	47.13
Invalid or blank votes			
Total votes		40,373	100.00
Turnout			

Washington's 28th legislative district House 2 primary election, 2010
Party	Candidate	Votes	%
Democratic	Representative Tami Green	11,581	47.72
Republican	Brian Wurts	6,073	25.03
Republican	Paul Wagemann	6,613	27.25
Invalid or blank votes			
Total votes			100.00
Turnout			

Washington's 28th legislative district House 2 general election, 2010
Party	Candidate	Votes	%
Democratic	Representative Tami Green	20,712	51.53
Republican	Paul Wagemann	19,481	48.47
Invalid or blank votes			
Total votes		40,193	100.00
Turnout			

=== District 29 ===
Washington's 29th legislative district House 1 primary election, 2010
Party	Candidate	Votes	%
Democratic	Connie Ladenburg	5,966	45.49
Democratic	Jonathan Johnson	1,989	15.17
Republican	Steven T. Cook	3,567	27.2
Republican	Bruce Parks	1,593	12.15
Invalid or blank votes			
Total votes			100.00
Turnout			

Washington's 29th legislative district House 1 general election, 2010
Party	Candidate	Votes	%
Democratic	Connie Ladenburg	15,934	59.94
Republican	Steven T. Cook	10,651	40.06
Invalid or blank votes			
Total votes			100.00
Turnout			

Washington's 29th legislative district House 2 general election, 2010
Party	Candidate	Votes	%
Democratic	Representative Steve Kirby	17,146	64.66
Republican	Jesse Miller	9,373	35.34
Invalid or blank votes			
Total votes			100.00
Turnout			

=== District 30 ===
Washington's 30th legislative district House 1 election, 2010
Party	Candidate	Votes	%
Democratic	Representative Mark Miloscia	22,726	59.5
Republican	Shawn Sullivan	15,466	40.5
Invalid or blank votes			
Total votes			100.00
Turnout			

Washington's 30th legislative district House 2 primary election, 2010
Party	Candidate	Votes	%
Democratic	Carol Gregory	9,227	44.01
Republican	Anthony Kalchik	1,832	8.74
Republican	Ed Barney	2,641	12.6
Republican	Katrina Asay	5,629	26.85
Republican	Jerry Galland	1,636	7.8
Invalid or blank votes			
Total votes			100.00
Turnout			

Washington's 30th legislative district House 2 general election, 2010
Party	Candidate	Votes	%
Democratic	Carol Gregory	18,829	49.60
Republican	Katrina Asay	19,130	50.40
Invalid or blank votes			
Total votes		37,959	100.00
Turnout			

=== District 31 ===
Washington's 31st legislative district House 1 primary election, 2010
Party	Candidate	Votes	%
Republican	Cathy Dahlquist	9,237	36.81
Democratic	Peggy Levesque	7,783	31.01
Republican	Shawn Bunney	8,077	32.18
Invalid or blank votes			
Total votes			100.00
Turnout			

Washington's 31st legislative district House 2 primary election, 2010
Party	Candidate	Votes	%
Democratic	Representative Christopher Hurst (Note: Prefers Independent Democratic Party)	14,094	57.97
Republican	Patrick Reed	7,614	31.32
Republican	Daniel Geske	2,606	10.72
Invalid or blank votes			
Total votes			100.00
Turnout			

Washington's 31st legislative district House 1 general election, 2010
Party	Candidate	Votes	%
Republican	Cathy Dahlquist	22,254	53.17
Republican	Shawn Bunney	20,479	46.83
Invalid or blank votes			
Total votes			100.00
Turnout			

Washington's 31st legislative district House 2 general election, 2010
Party	Candidate	Votes	%
Democratic	Representative Christopher Hurst	27,396	58.03
Republican	Patrick Reed	19,815	41.97
Invalid or blank votes			
Total votes			100.00
Turnout			

=== District 32 ===
Washington's 32nd legislative district House 1 primary election, 2010
Party	Candidate	Votes	%
Democratic	Doris McConnell	6,227	19.99
Democratic	Cindy Ryu	13,179	42.3
Republican	Art Coday	11,747	37.71
Invalid or blank votes			
Total votes			100.00
Turnout			

Washington's 32nd legislative district House 2 primary election, 2010
Party	Candidate	Votes	%
Democratic	Representative Ruth Kagi	17,693	56.48
Democratic	Stan Lippmann	2,448	7.81
Republican	Gary Gagliardi	11,185	35.71
Invalid or blank votes			
Total votes			100.00
Turnout			

Washington's 32nd legislative district House 1 general election, 2010
Party	Candidate	Votes	%
Democratic	Cindy Ryu	33,550	61.15
Republican	Art Coday	21,314	38.85
Invalid or blank votes			
Total votes			100.00
Turnout			

Washington's 32nd legislative district House 2 general election, 2010
Party	Candidate	Votes	%
Democratic	Representative Ruth Kagi	35,344	64.47
Republican	Gary Gagliardi	19,480	35.53
Invalid or blank votes			
Total votes			100.00
Turnout			

=== District 33 ===
Washington's 33rd legislative district House 1 election, 2010
Party	Candidate	Votes	%
Democratic	Representative Tina Orwall		
Invalid or blank votes			
Total votes			100.00
Turnout			

Washington's 33rd legislative district House 2 election, 2010
Party	Candidate	Votes	%
Democratic	Representative Dave Upthegrove		
Invalid or blank votes			
Total votes			100.00
Turnout			

=== District 34 ===
Washington's 34th legislative district House 1 general election, 2010
Party	Candidate	Votes	%
Democratic	Representative Eileen Cody	38,774	80.59
Republican	Ray Carter (Note: Prefers Reluctantly R Party)	9,338	19.41
Invalid or blank votes			
Total votes			100.00
Turnout			

Washington's 34th legislative district House 2 primary election, 2010
Party	Candidate	Votes	%
Democratic	Joe Fitzgibbon	9,315	34.61
Democratic	Mike Heavey	8,814	32.75
Independent	Geoffrey Mac McElroy	4,954	18.41
Democratic	Marcee Stone	3,830	14.23
Invalid or blank votes			
Total votes			100.00
Turnout			

Washington's 34th legislative district House 2 general election, 2010
Party	Candidate	Votes	%
Democratic	Joe Fitzgibbon	26,187	57.3
Democratic	Mike Heavey	19,514	42.7
Invalid or blank votes			
Total votes			100.00
Turnout			

=== District 35 ===
Washington's 35th legislative district House 2 primary election, 2010
Party	Candidate	Votes	%
Democratic	Representative Fred Finn	16,127	46.62
Republican	Linda Simpson	14,125	40.83
Independent	Glenn Gaither	4,339	12.54
Invalid or blank votes			
Total votes			100.00
Turnout			

Washington's 35th legislative district House 1 general election, 2010
Party	Candidate	Votes	%
Democratic	Representative Kathy Haigh	28,590	50.91
Republican	Daniel (Dan) Griffey	27,566	49.09
Invalid or blank votes			
Total votes			100.00
Turnout			

Washington's 35th legislative district House 2 general election, 2010
Party	Candidate	Votes	%
Democratic	Representative Fred Finn	29,543	53.46
Republican	Linda Simpson	25,724	46.54
Invalid or blank votes			
Total votes			100.00
Turnout			

=== District 36 ===
Washington's 36th legislative district House 1 election, 2010
Party	Candidate	Votes	%
Democratic	Representative Reuven Carlyle		
Invalid or blank votes			
Total votes			100.00
Turnout			

Washington's 36th legislative district House 2 election, 2010
Party	Candidate	Votes	%
Democratic	Representative Mary Lou Dickerson	49,778	81.29
Republican	Jill England	11,459	18.71
Invalid or blank votes			
Total votes			100.00
Turnout			

=== District 37 ===
Washington's 37th legislative district House 1 election, 2010
Party	Candidate	Votes	%
Democratic	Representative Sharon Tomiko Santos		
Invalid or blank votes			
Total votes			100.00
Turnout			

Washington's 37th legislative district House 2 election, 2010
Party	Candidate	Votes	%
Democratic	Representative Eric Pettigrew	30,787	84.37
Democratic	John Stafford	5,702	15.63
Invalid or blank votes			
Total votes			100.00
Turnout			

=== District 38 ===
Washington's 38th legislative district House 1 election, 2010
Party	Candidate	Votes	%
Democratic	Representative John McCoy	21,875	57.89
Republican	Hugh Fleet	15,910	42.11
Invalid or blank votes			
Total votes			100.00
Turnout			

Washington's 38th legislative district House 2 election, 2010
Party	Candidate	Votes	%
Democratic	Representative Mike Sells	22,043	58.55
Republican	Iris Lilly	15,602	41.45
Invalid or blank votes			
Total votes			100.00
Turnout			

=== District 39 ===
Washington's 39th legislative district House 1 election, 2010
Party	Candidate	Votes	%
Republican	Representative Dan Kristiansen	31,578	59.44
Democratic	Eleanor Walters	21,544	40.56
Invalid or blank votes			
Total votes			100.00
Turnout			

Washington's 39th legislative district House 2 election, 2010
Party	Candidate	Votes	%
Republican	Representative Kirk Pearson		
Invalid or blank votes			
Total votes			100.00
Turnout			

=== District 40 ===
Washington's 40th legislative district House 1 primary election, 2010
Party	Candidate	Votes	%
Republican	Dusty Gulleson	5,295	15.66
Republican	Chuck Carrell	1,487	4.40
Happiness Party	Doug (Yoshe) Revelle	647	1.91
Republican	Mike Newman	5,876	17.38
Democratic	Kristine Lytton	8,896	26.31
Democratic	Tom Pasma	5,308	15.70
Democratic	Thomas Boucher	2,698	7.98
Democratic	Justin Van Dyk	1,027	3.04
Republican	Donna R. Miller	2,579	7.63
Invalid or blank votes			
Total votes			100.00
Turnout			

Washington's 40th legislative district House 2 primary election, 2010
Party	Candidate	Votes	%
Democratic	Representative Jeff Morris	18,348	51.56
Green	Howard Pellett	2,666	7.49
Republican	John Swapp	14,575	40.95
Invalid or blank votes			
Total votes			100.00
Turnout			

Washington's 40th legislative district House 1 general election, 2010
Party	Candidate	Votes	%
Democratic	Kristine Lytton	33,304	57.31
Republican	Mike Newman	24,812	42.69

Washington's 40th legislative district House 2 general election, 2010
Party	Candidate	Votes	%
Democratic	Representative Jeff Morris	33,064	56.87
Republican	John Swapp	25,079	43.13

=== District 41 ===
Washington's 41st legislative district House 1 primary election, 2010
Party	Candidate	Votes	%
Democratic	Representative Marcie Maxwell	17,411	52.07
Republican	Peter Dunbar	16,029	47.93
Invalid or blank votes			
Total votes			100.00
Turnout			

Washington's 41st legislative district House 2 primary election, 2010
Party	Candidate	Votes	%
Democratic	Representative Judy Clibborn	18,947	56.50
Republican	Stephen Strader	12,853	38.33
Independent	Orion S. Webster	1,736	5.18
Invalid or blank votes			
Total votes			100.00
Turnout			

Washington's 41st legislative district House 1 general election, 2010
Party	Candidate	Votes	%
Democratic	Representative Marcie Maxwell	32,205	54.11
Republican	Peter Dunbar	27,309	45.89
Invalid or blank votes			
Total votes			100.00

Washington's 41st legislative district House 2 general election, 2010
Party	Candidate	Votes	%
Democratic	Representative Judy Clibborn	35,015	59.99
Republican	Stephen Strader	23,350	40.01
Invalid or blank votes			
Total votes			100.00
Turnout			

=== District 42 ===
Washington's 42nd legislative district House 1 primary election, 2010
Party	Candidate	Votes	%
Republican	Jason Overstreet	15,852	45.66
Democratic	Al Jensen	9,285	26.75
Republican	Michael C. Smith	1,522	4.38
Democratic	Richard May	4,963	14.30
Independent	Craig Mayberry	3,094	8.91
Invalid or blank votes			
Total votes			100.00
Turnout			

Washington's 42nd legislative district House 2 primary election, 2010
Party	Candidate	Votes	%
Democratic	Representative Kelli Linville	18,460	51.89
Republican	Vincent Buys	17,116	48.11
Invalid or blank votes			
Total votes			100.00
Turnout			

Washington's 42nd legislative district House 1 general election, 2010
Party	Candidate	Votes	%
Republican	Jason Overstreet	31,885	52.75
Democratic	Al Jensen	28,558	47.25
Invalid or blank votes			
Total votes		61,062	100.00
Turnout			

Washington's 42nd legislative district House 2 general election, 2010
Party	Candidate	Votes	%
Democratic	Representative Kelli Linville	30,454	49.87
Republican	Vincent Buys	30,608	50.13
Invalid or blank votes			
Total votes		61,062	100.00
Turnout			
Republican gain from Democratic			

=== District 43 ===
Washington's 43rd legislative district House 1 election, 2010
Party	Candidate	Votes	%
Democratic	Representative Jamie Pedersen		
Invalid or blank votes			
Total votes			100.00
Turnout			

Washington's 43rd legislative district House 2 election, 2010
Party	Candidate	Votes	%
Democratic	Representative Frank Chopp		
Republican	Kim Verde		
Invalid or blank votes			
Total votes			100.00
Turnout			

=== District 44 ===
Washington's 44th legislative district House 1 election, 2010
Party	Candidate	Votes	%
Democratic	Representative Hans Dunshee		
Republican	Shahram Hadian		
Republican	Bob McCaughan		
Invalid or blank votes			
Total votes			100.00
Turnout			

Washington's 44th legislative district House 2 election, 2010
Party	Candidate	Votes	%
Republican	Representative Mike Hope	38,816	65.25
Democratic	John Boerger	20,673	34.75
Invalid or blank votes			
Total votes			100.00
Turnout			

=== District 45 ===
Washington's 45th legislative district House 1 election, 2010
Party	Candidate	Votes	%
Democratic	Representative Roger Goodman	29,242	51.33
Republican	Kevin Haistings	27,731	48.67
Invalid or blank votes			
Total votes			100.00
Turnout			

Washington's 45th legislative district House 2 election, 2010
Party	Candidate	Votes	%
Democratic	Representative Larry Springer	33,083	58.22
Republican	Mark Isaacs	23,738	41.78
Invalid or blank votes			
Total votes			100.00
Turnout			

=== District 46 ===
Washington's 46th legislative district House 1 election, 2010
Party	Candidate	Votes	%
Democratic	David Frockt		
Invalid or blank votes			
Total votes			100.00
Turnout			

Washington's 46th legislative district House 2 election, 2010
Party	Candidate	Votes	%
Democratic	Representative Phyllis Gutierrez Kenney		
Independent	Beau Gunderson		
Invalid or blank votes			
Total votes			100.00
Turnout			

=== District 47 ===
Washington's 47th legislative district House 1 primary election, 2010
Party	Candidate	Votes	%
Democratic	Representative Geoff Simpson	9,716	38.8
Republican	Nancy Wyatt	5,418	21.64
Republican	Mark Hargrove	9,908	39.57
Invalid or blank votes			
Total votes			100.00
Turnout			

Washington's 47th legislative district House 1 general election, 2010
Party	Candidate	Votes	%
Democratic	Representative Geoff Simpson	19,943	43.67
Republican	Mark Hargrove	25,728	56.33
Invalid or blank votes			
Total votes			100.00
Turnout			

Washington's 47th legislative district House 2 general election, 2010
Party	Candidate	Votes	%
Democratic	Representative Pat Sullivan	25,813	57.13
Republican	Rodrigo M. Yanez	19,368	42.87
Invalid or blank votes			
Total votes			100.00
Turnout			

=== District 48 ===
Washington's 48th legislative district House 1 election, 2010
Party	Candidate	Votes	%
Democratic	Representative Ross Hunter	25,981	54
Republican	Diane Tebelius	21,283	46
Invalid or blank votes			
Total votes			100.00
Turnout			

Washington's 48th legislative district House 2 election, 2010
Party	Candidate	Votes	%
Democratic	Representative Deborah Eddy	25,941	57.31
Republican	Philip L. Wilson	19,321	42.69
Invalid or blank votes			
Total votes			100.00
Turnout			

=== District 49 ===
Washington's 49th legislative district House 1 election, 2010
Party	Candidate	Votes	%
Democratic	Representative Jim Jacks	23,381	57.14
Republican	Bill Cismar	17,540	42.86
Invalid or blank votes			
Total votes			100.00
Turnout			

Washington's 49th legislative district House 2 election, 2010
Party	Candidate	Votes	%
Democratic	Representative Jim Moeller	21,975	53.48
Republican	Craig Riley	19,118	46.52
Invalid or blank votes			
Total votes			100.00
Turnout			
