= Josh Penner =

American politician (born 1982)

Member of the Washington House of Representatives from the 31st district
- Incumbent
- Assumed office January 13, 2025 Serving with Drew Stokesbary
- Preceded by: Eric Robertson

Personal details
- Born: Joshua Andrew Penner; August 4, 1982 (age 44) Bonney Lake, Washington
- Party: Republican
- Children: 4
- Education: Saint Martin's University, BA; Harvard University, ALM

Joshua Andrew Penner (born August 4, 1982) is a Republican member of Washington House of Representatives for District 31. Penner took office on January 15, 2025.

== Early life and education ==
Penner was raised in Bonney Lake, Washington. He graduated from Sumner High School, Saint Martin's University (BA), and Harvard Extension School (ALM).

== Career ==
Penner has been the mayor of Orting, Washington, since 2018. He is a small business owner. He is the CEO of Inquisic.AI.

He is a U.S. Marine Corps veteran, having served as a radio operator in Iraq.

In November 2025, Penner was elected to the Washington House of Representatives for the 31st District. He received 61.08% of the vote.

He serves on the board of directors for the Association of Washington Cities.

== Personal life ==
Penner married his high school sweetheart, Patricia (Tricia), in August 2005. She is a teacher for the Bethel School District.
