= Nettie Smith =

Washington State politician

Nettie Luella Smith

Member of the Washington House of Representatives from the 32nd district
- In office 1943 (appointed) – January 13, 1947 Serving with Richard H. Murphy
- Preceded by: Jurie B. Smith
- Succeeded by: Wesley R. Eldridge; Agnes M. Gehrman

Personal details
- Born: April 22, 1886 Des Moines, Iowa, U.S.
- Died: April 25, 1962 (aged 76) Seattle, Washington, U.S.
- Party: Democratic
- Spouse: Jurie B. Smith
- Occupation: Senior Clerk

Nettie Luella Smith (née Purinton; April 22, 1886 – April 25, 1962) was an American politician who served as a member of the Washington House of Representatives from 1943 to 1947. She represented Washington's 32nd legislative district as a Democrat.

Born in Iowa, she moved to Seattle in 1926 and had five sons and a daughter. She was initially appointed to serve out the unexpired term of her husband Jurie B. Smith after his death just after the November 1942 general election; she then won reelection in 1944. Jurie had served in the legislature since 1932 and had been the leader of the progressive wing of the Democratic Party. She was affiliated with the Order of the Eastern Star.

Her grandson was "The Frugal Gourmet" Jeff Smith.
