= Carolyn Edmonds =

American politician

Member of the King County Council from the 1st district
- In office January 1, 2002 – January 1, 2006
- Preceded by: Maggie Fimia
- Succeeded by: Bob Ferguson

Member of the Washington House of Representatives from the 32nd district
- In office January 11, 1999 – January 1, 2002
- Preceded by: Patty Butler
- Succeeded by: Maralyn Chase

Personal details
- Party: Democratic

Carolyn Edmonds is an American politician who served as a member of the King County Council from 2002 to 2006. A member of the Democratic Party, she represented the 1st district.
