= Mary Skinner =

Washington State politician

Member of the Washington House of Representatives from the 14th district
- In office January 9, 1995 – January 12, 2009
- Preceded by: Betty Edmondson
- Succeeded by: Norm Johnson

Personal details
- Born: June 7, 1945 (age 81) California, U.S.
- Died: February 5, 2009 (aged 63) Yakima, Washington, U.S.
- Party: Republican
- Education: Central Washington University (B.A.); Yakima Valley Community College (now Yakima Valley College)
- Occupation: Teacher (junior high)

Mary Skinner (June 7, 1945 – February 5, 2009) was an American politician who served as a member of the Washington House of Representatives for seven consecutive terms from 1995 to 2009. She represented Washington's 14th legislative district as a Republican. She was the daughter of migrant workers and a great niece of Venustiano Carranza, a former President of Mexico.

Herself raised as a farm worker, she was one of a growing number of Mexican American women who entered politics in Washington State from the 1980s.

In 2005 to 2007, she served as the Republican Caucus vice-chair, and she held positions on various state commissions and committees in the course of her career. She served on numerous committees, with leadership roles on the health care committee (vice chair, 1997–99 and 2001–03) and trade and economic development committee (ranking minority member, 2003–05).

Outside the legislature, she served on the boards of Yakima Valley Community College (now Yakima Valley College), as well as its foundation; Heritage College; Capitol Theatre; and represented Washington's 3rd congressional district on the Washington State Board of Education. She also performed community service in other capacities for several healthcare and educational institutions. She was affiliated with the Washington Athletic Club, the American Association of University Women (Walla Walla and Olympia), Junior League (Yakima and Olympia), and PEO.

She died at her home in Yakima on February 5, 2009.
