= Morgan Irwin =

American law enforcement officer and politician from Washington

Member of the Washington House of Representatives from the 31st district
- In office January 9, 2017 – January 11, 2021
- Preceded by: Christopher Hurst
- Succeeded by: Eric Robertson

Personal details
- Born: 1983 (age 42–43) Seattle, Washington, U.S.
- Party: Republican
- Spouse: Melissa Irwin
- Children: 3
- Education: Washington State University
- Occupation: Police Officer, Politician

Morgan Thomas Lewis Irwin (born 1983) is an American law enforcement officer and politician from Washington. Irwin is a former Republican member of Washington House of Representatives, representing the 31st Legislative District from 2017 to 2021. He previously was the ranking Republican member on the House Civil Rights & Judiciary Committee.

== Education ==
In 2007, Irwin earned a Bachelor's degree in Agricultural Business / Economics from Washington State University.

== Career ==
Irwin was a police officer with Seattle Police Department.

Irwin was first appointed in 2017, filling a vacancy caused by Representative-elect Phil Fortunato's selection to succeed Senator Pam Roach, who had resigned to join Pierce County Council. After being retained to fill remainder of his term in a 2017 special election, he was reelected in 2018.

Irwin gained notoriety in 2018 when he stole a jet ski on Lake Washington in order to contact two kayakers who were pretending to be in distress.

== Awards ==
- 2020 Guardians of Small Business. Presented by NFIB.

== Personal life ==
Irwin's wife is Melissa Irwin. They have three children. Irwin and his family live in Enumclaw, Washington.
