= Hymes =

Hymes is a surname. Notable people with the surname include:

- Cheryl Hymes (born 1954), American politician
- Dell Hymes (1927–2009), American linguist, anthropologist, and folklorist
- Edward Hymes (1908–1962), American bridge player
- Laurie Hymes, American voice actress
- Randy Hymes (born 1979), American football player
