= Eric Robertson (politician) =

American politician (1963–2026)

Member of the Washington House of Representatives from the 31st district
- In office January 11, 2021 – January 13, 2025 Serving with Drew Stokesbary
- Preceded by: Morgan Irwin
- Succeeded by: Josh Penner
- In office January 9, 1995 – May 31, 1998
- Preceded by: Judith Roland
- Succeeded by: Darrel Gordon

Personal details
- Born: December 6, 1963 Washington, D.C., U.S.
- Died: April 29, 2026 (aged 62)
- Party: Republican
- Spouse: Carolyn (nee Hosford) Robertson (1989–2010)
- Children: 5
- Occupation: Trooper, US Marshal, Politician
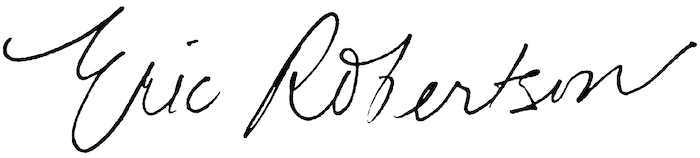
- Signature

Eric E. Robertson (December 6, 1963 – April 29, 2026) was an American law enforcement officer and politician from Washington. Robertson was a Republican member of Washington House of Representatives for District 31. Robertson first took office on January 9, 1995.

== Early life and education ==
On December 6, 1963, Robertson was born in Washington, D.C. to Eugene and Lois (Matthews) Robertson. Robertson grew up in Buckley, Washington. He attended Green River College and City University. In 1985, Robertson graduated from Washington State Patrol Academy. In 1999, he graduated from FBI National Academy.

== Career ==
In 1983, Robertson was hired by the Washington State Patrol and in 1985, he became a Trooper for Washington State Patrol. Robertson attained the rank of Captain, serving Director of the Office of Government & Media Relations and Commander of the Office of Professional Standards, until 2002.

On November 8, 1994, Robertson won the election and became a Republican member of Washington House of Representatives for District 31, Position 1. He defeated Judi Roland with 57.77% of the votes. On November 5, 1996, as an incumbent, Robertson won the election and continued serving Washington House of Representatives for District 31, Position 1 by defeating Darrell Carrier with 64.25% of the votes. On January 3, 1997, Robertson was elected as the House Republican Caucus Chair.

In 2002, Robertson was appointed by President George W. Bush to become the US Marshal for United States Marshals Service for Western Washington. He served as a US Marshal until 2007. In 2007, Robertson became an Administrator for Valley Regional Fire Authority, until retirement in 2018.

On November 3, 2020, Robertson won the election and became a Republican member of Washington House of Representatives for District 31, Position 2. Robertson defeated Thomas R. Clark with 62.98% of the votes.

== Personal life and death ==
Robertson was married to Carolyn Hosford. They had five adult children. Robertson lived in Sumner, Washington. He died on April 29, 2026, at the age of 62.

== Awards ==
- 2006 Director's Honorary Award. Presented by United States Marshals Service Director John Clark.
- 2011 Lion of the Year. Presented by Auburn Noon Lions.
- 2012 Melvin Jones Fellow Award. Presented by Auburn Noon Lions.
- 2018 President's Award. Presented by Washington Fire Chiefs Association.
