= Judith Roland =

Washington State politician

Member of the Washington House of Representatives from the 31st district
- In office January 14, 1991 – January 9, 1995
- Preceded by: Mike Todd
- Succeeded by: Eric Robertson

Personal details
- Born: 1943 (age 82–83) Florida, U.S.
- Party: Democratic
- Occupation: Small business owner

Judith "Judi" Roland (born 1943) is a former American politician who served as a member of the Washington House of Representatives from 1991 to 1995. She represented Washington's 31st legislative district as a Democrat. She also served on the Auburn City Council.
