= Darlene Fairley =

American politician

Darlene Cook Fairley

Member of the Washington Senate from the 32nd district
- In office January 9, 1995 – January 10, 2011
- Preceded by: Al Williams
- Succeeded by: Maralyn Chase

Personal details
- Party: Democratic
- Spouse: Michael Gilbert Fairley
- Committees: Government Operations and Elections Committee, Health and Long-Term Care, Ways and Means

Darlene Cook Fairley (born 1943) was a member of the Washington State Senate from 1995 to 2011 representing the 32nd District. In the Senate, she chaired the Government Operations and Elections Committee.

== Education ==
Fairly earned in B.S. in Political Science from the University of Washington in 1967.

== Career ==
Fairley became a Lake Forest Park councilmember in January 1992 and was first elected to the State Senate in 1994. She succeeded Democrat Al Williams, who retired instead of moving when the 32nd district's boundaries were changed.

== Personal life ==
Fairley married Michael Gilbert Fairley in 1969. Fairley became disabled when her spine was crushed in a traffic accident involving a drunk driver in August 1977.
