= Maralyn Chase =

American politician

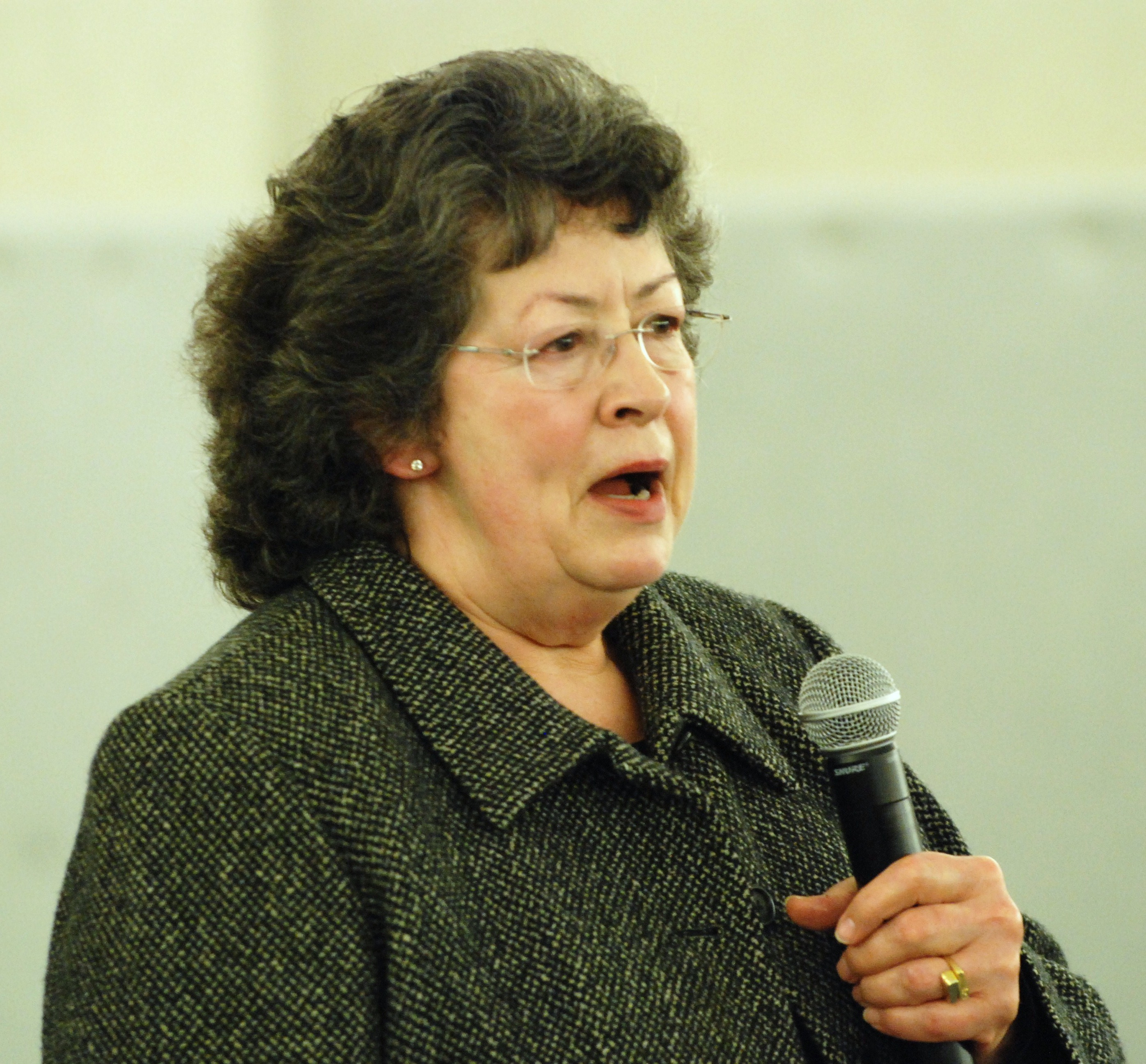
- Chase in 2008

Member of the Washington Senate from the 32nd district
- In office January 10, 2011 – January 14, 2019
- Preceded by: Darlene Fairley
- Succeeded by: Jesse Salomon

Member of the Washington House of Representatives from the 32nd district
- In office January 7, 2002 – January 10, 2011
- Preceded by: Carolyn Edmonds
- Succeeded by: Cindy Ryu

Personal details
- Born: Maralyn A. Mayfield; January 6, 1942 (age 84) Yakima, Washington, U.S.
- Party: Democratic
- Spouse: widowed
- Education: University of Washington
- Profession: educator, business owner
- Website: Official

Maralyn A. Chase (née Mayfield, born January 6, 1942) is a former Democratic member of the Washington State Senate, representing the 32nd district from 2011 to 2019. Before her election to the Senate, she served in the Washington State House of Representatives from 2002 to 2011.

== Career ==
In 1997, Chase became an associate of Women's Institute for Freedom of the Press (WIFP). WIFP is an American nonprofit publishing organization. The organization works to increase communication between women and connect the public with forms of women-based media.

Chase was appointed by the legislature after Representative Carolyn Edmonds resigned in November 2001 to serve on the King County Council. She was reelected in 2002, 2004, 2006, and 2008.

In 2010, Chase ran for the Senate seat vacated by Senator Darlene Fairley. She was reelected in 2014, and lost her reelection in 2018 to Jesse Salomon.

An amendment added to Senate Bill 5575 by Maralyn Chase added a Georgia-Pacific paper mill in Camas, WA to the list of pre-1999 biomass facilities that may generate renewable electricity.

== Election results ==
=== 2008 ===
2008 Washington General Election
Party	Candidate	Votes	%	±%
Democratic	Maralyn Chase		69%	
Republican	Alex Rion		31%	

2008 Washington Top-Two Election
Party	Candidate	Votes	%	±%
Democratic	Maralyn Chase		63%	
Republican	Alex Rion		27%	
Independent	Maragret Wiggens		10%	

=== 2006 ===
2006 Washington General Election
Party	Candidate	Votes	%	±%
Democratic	Maralyn Chase		72%	
Republican	Norine Federow		28%	

=== 2004 ===
2004 Washington General Election
Party	Candidate	Votes	%	±%
Democratic	Maralyn Chase		100%	

=== 2002 ===
2002 Washington General Election
Party	Candidate	Votes	%	±%
Democratic	Maralyn Chase		58%	
Republican	Robert Ramson		42%	

2002 Washington Primary Election
Party	Candidate	Votes	%	±%
Democratic	Maralyn Chase		35%	
Republican	Robert Ramson		34%	
Democratic	Kevin Grossman		32%	
