= Betty Edmondson =

American politician (1924–1998)

Betty L. Edmondson

Member of the Washington House of Representatives from the 14th district
- In office January 1991 – January 9, 1995
- Preceded by: Shirley Doty
- Succeeded by: Mary Skinner

Personal details
- Born: Betty Riggs; February 23, 1924 Camarillo, California, U.S.
- Died: April 16, 1998 (aged 74) Yakima, Washington, U.S.
- Party: Republican
- Spouse: Merwin “Mer” Edmondson
- Children: 3
- Education: University of Washington B.A.

Betty L Edmondson (February 23, 1924 – April 16, 1998) was an American politician who served in the Washington State House of Representatives from the 14th district from 1991 to 1995. She also served on the Yakima City Council and was the first female mayor of Yakima, serving for three terms.

Edmondson died on April 16, 1998, due to bone cancer.
