= Shirley Doty =

American politician

Member of the Washington House of Representatives from the 14th district
- In office 1985–1991
- Succeeded by: Betty Edmondson

Personal details
- Born: February 1, 1930 Anchorage, Alaska
- Died: October 9, 2001 (aged 71) Yakima, Washington
- Party: Republican

Shirley Louise Doty (February 1, 1930 – October 9, 2001) was an American politician. She was a Republican, representing District 14 in the Washington House of Representatives which included parts of Yakima County including Yakima, Selah, Cowiche-Naches Heights and West Valley, from 1985 to 1991. She was also a member of Yakima City Council.
