= Kristine Lytton =

American politician (born 1960)

Member of the Washington House of Representatives from the 40th district
- In office January 10, 2011 – January 14, 2019
- Preceded by: Dave Quall
- Succeeded by: Debra Lekanoff

Personal details
- Born: Kristine C. Alderson; 1960 (age 65–66) Illinois
- Party: Democratic
- Education: Lewis and Clark Community College (AA); Southern Illinois University (attended); University of Missouri (attended)

Kristine C. Lytton (née Alderson, born 1960) is an American politician.

Lytton was born in Illinois in 1960. She lives in Anacortes, Washington with her husband and family. She served on the Anacortes School Board. Lytton is a member of the Democratic Party. She served on the Washington House of Representatives, from 2010 to 2019, representing the 40th district.
