= Debra Lekanoff =

American politician from Washington state

Member of the Washington House of Representatives from the 40th district
- Incumbent
- Assumed office January 14, 2019 Serving with Alex Ramel
- Preceded by: Kristine Lytton

Personal details
- Born: February 26, 1971 (age 55) Yakutat, Alaska, U.S.
- Party: Democratic

Debra E. Lekanoff (born February 26, 1971) is a Democratic member of the Washington Legislature representing the State's 40th House district for position 1. She is a member of the Tlingit tribe and was credited with being the first female tribal member to serve in the Washington House of Representatives. However, Lois Stratton was actually the first female tribal member to serve in the Washington House of Representatives, starting her first term in 1979, making Lekanoff the second female tribal member to serve in this position.

== Career ==
Lekanoff won the election on 6 November 2018 from the platform of the Democratic Party. She secured sixty-seven percent of the vote, while her closest rival, Republican Michael Petrish, secured thirty-three percent.

Lekanoff was the head sponsor of the Missing and Murdered Indigenous Women's and People's Alert System, the first nationwide alert system for missing Indigenous people in the United States (House Bill 1725). On 31 March 2022, Washington State Governor Jay Inslee signed six bills into law, two of which focus on helping missing Indigenous people that will take effect June 9.

== Personal life ==
Lekanoff is Aleut from the Pribilof Islands and Tlingit from Yakutat in Alaska.

== Electoral history ==
August 2018 State Representative Position 1 Primary
Party	Candidate	Votes	%
Democratic	Alex Ramel	7,684	19.13
Democratic	Debra Lekanoff	11,323	28.19
Republican	Michael Petrish	8,446	21.03
Republican	Daniel Miller	2,686	6.69
Democratic	Rud Browne	7,394	18.41
Democratic	Tom Pasma	2,629	6.55

November 2018 State Representative Position 1 General election
Party	Candidate	Votes	%
Democratic	Debra Lekanoff	48,153	67.02
Republican	Michael Petrish	23,692	32.98

== See also ==
- List of Native American politicians
- Native American women in politics
