= Jeff Morris (politician) =

American politician from Washington

Speaker pro tempore of the Washington House of Representatives
- In office January 14, 2008 – January 10, 2011
- Preceded by: John Lovick
- Succeeded by: Jim Moeller

Member of the Washington House of Representatives from the 40th district
- In office January 13, 1997 – January 6, 2020
- Preceded by: Cheryl Hymes
- Succeeded by: Alex Ramel

Personal details
- Born: Jeffrey Robert Morris; February 24, 1964 (age 62) Anacortes, Washington, U.S.
- Party: Democratic
- Education: Central Washington University
- Occupation: Politician
- Website: Official

Jeffrey Robert Morris (born February 24, 1964) is an American politician who served as a member of the Washington House of Representatives, representing the 40th district from 1997 to 2020. A member of the Democratic Party, Morris was one of three self-identified American Indians, along with John McCoy (Tulalip Tribes) and Jay Rodne (Bad River Band of Chippewa), in the Washington State Legislature.

== Early life and education ==
Jeff Morris is a fourth-generation native of Guemes Island. He also lived in Anacortes, Washington, where he graduated Anacortes High School in 1982. He graduated from Central Washington University.

== Career ==
Based in Anacortes, Morris became active in the Democratic Party and successfully ran for the state House of Representatives in 1996 to represent the 40th Legislative District. Repeatedly re-elected, he served as chairman of the Technology and Economic Development Committee and is also a member of the Environment and Transportation committees. He has previously served as speaker pro tempore, House floor leader, and chairman of the Finance and Technology, Energy, and Communications committees.

Morris served on the executive committee of the National Conference of State Legislatures and is the past chairman of the Council of State Governments-West and past president of the Pacific Northwest Economic Region.

He retired mid-term in 2020 to take a job in the private sector, and activist Alex Ramel was appointed to serve for the remainder of his term.
