= 2010 Washington's 21st Legislative District, House 2 election =

Washington's 21st Legislative District, House 2 election, 2010 had attracted attention from local media as being one of the top five races to care about statewide, as well as national attention from politically liberal groups Open Left and People For the American Way. The election resulted in the re-election of incumbent Democrat Marko Liias by a margin of about 9 percentage points.

== Primary election ==
Marko Liias's first challenger in the top-two primary was Republican Elizabeth Scott. Scott first publicly considered running after speaking at a Tax Day, April 15, 2009 rally in Everett, WA, where hundreds protested large government bailouts, debt, spending and taxes. On July 4, Scott announced her candidacy for 21st Legislative District State Representative, position 2. On Sunday, August 23, 2009, her expected campaign launch was reported in the Everett Herald regional newspaper. By April 2010, Scott had raised over $20,000, received many grassroots volunteers and attracted media attention for her fundraising efforts. Liias called Scott's candidacy "serious" and branded her grassroots supporters a "mob" in a fundraising email.

When Alan Tagle entered the race as a second Republican candidate, local GOP leadership expressed unfamiliarity with Tagle and endorsed Scott, who pointed to her key endorsements from other GOP leaders. During filing week, Mike Huisman of the self-styled SeniorSide Party emerged as a fourth candidate. As of July 22, 2010, Scott had raised $43,033.17, Liias $75,052.28, Tagle $675, and Huisman $0. In the top-two primary, Scott and Liias easily advanced with 32.6 and 50.1%, respectively.

== General election ==
On October 7, the progressive group Open Left reported that the politically liberal advocacy group People For the American Way had given financial support to state legislators Liias and Mike Frerichs of Illinois, and singled out those state legislators to receive special attention and financial support. By October 16, Liias had raised $131,580.09 and spent $111,548.08, while Scott had raised $80,841.15 and spent $59,242.67. Seattle Gay News called the race one of the five races across the state to care about. Liias won reelection with 54% of the vote, though Scott won more votes than any Republican candidate for the district since 2000.

== Attack sites ==
An attack site emerged in June which accused Scott of being a "carpetbagger", "career union soldier" and "not a real conservative". Tagle accused Liias supporters of posting that site and another site which condemned Tagle for running a bikini barista. Liias denied the charge while Scott and local GOP leaders suggested that Tagle was behind the first attack site. After Scott and Liias won the primary, both attack sites were closed down.

=== Marko Madness ===
After the primary, a group called Red Snohomish PAC, led by Liias's 2008 election opponent Andrew Funk, put up a site called Marko Madness. The site, as described by the local media,

has a March-madness basketball tournament-type bracket with competition among what it says are flaws in Liias’ personal, financial or political background. Each week, it highlights two of those flaws. The site asks readers to choose which of the two should advance to semi-final competition, with the semi-final winners advancing to a final, from which one will be selected for a campaign commercial.

The form was like that of the Elite 8 bracket in March Madness. Liias responded by adding a section called "Curing Marko Madness" to his website with the comment, "The best cure for Marko Madness is a dose of the truth." While Liias has told Scott to call for a stop to the site, Scott stated the site was unconnected to her campaign. As one local media outlet summarized, "Scott and Liias have each accused the other of violating a pledge to run clean campaigns based on issues."
