= Ruth Kagi =

American politician from Washington

Member of the Washington House of Representatives from the 32nd district
- In office January 11, 1999 – January 14, 2019
- Preceded by: Grace E. Cole
- Succeeded by: Lauren Davis

Personal details
- Born: Ruth LeCocq; August 14, 1945 (age 81) Seattle, Washington, U.S.
- Party: Democratic
- Education: University of Washington, Syracuse University
- Occupation: Politician

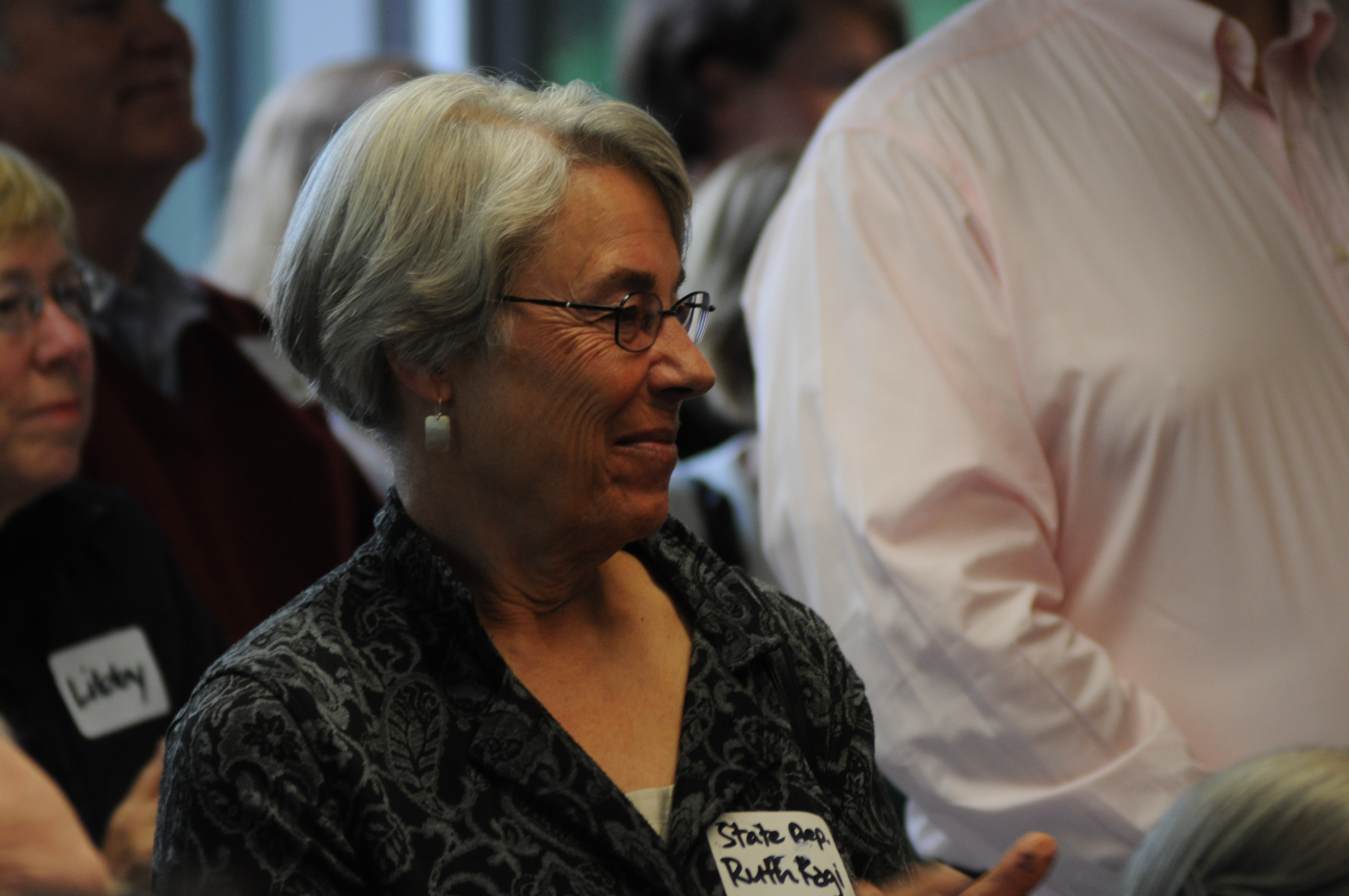
Ruth Kagi, member of the Washington State House of Representatives from the 32nd District, photographed at King County Council member Bob Ferguson's annual Shrimp Feed, a Democratic Party get-together at Northgate Community Center, Seattle, Washington.

Ruth LeCocq Kagi (born August 14, 1945) is an American politician from Washington. Kagi is a former Democratic member of the Washington House of Representatives, representing the 32nd district.

She did not seek re-election in 2018, and was succeeded by Lauren Davis.

== Personal life ==
Kagi's husband is Mark. Kagi has two children and three step-children. Kagi and her family live in Shoreline, Washington.
