= Dean Willard =

American politician

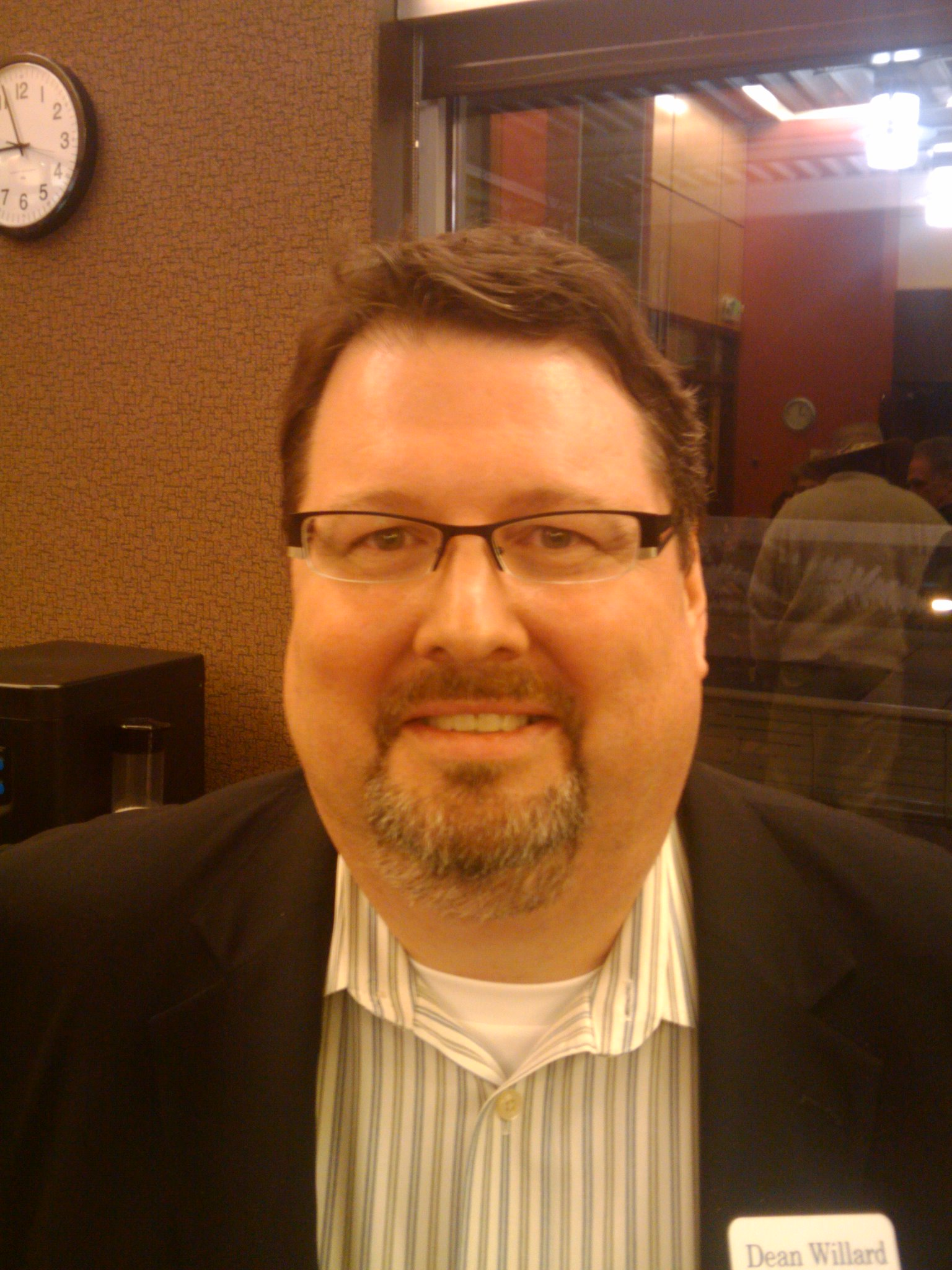
Dean Willard

Dean Willard was a candidate for the Seattle Port Commission, fifth position, in 2011.

== Biography ==
As a senior in high school, Willard interned with Alaska Attorney General Wilson Condon. Willard attended Brigham Young University in Idaho.

From June 1993 to July 1995, Willard was the Vice President of Perception Management, a public relations and political campaign consulting company. He was responsible for information technology functions. In August 1995, he was a Partner and Technology Consultant at Accenture and stayed there until October 2006, where he then became the Vice President of Enterprise Information Security at T-Mobile USA. In 2008, he left T-Mobile USA to start his own IT Security consulting business, working as a technology management and information security consultant.

He is married to Dorothy Willard.

=== Politics ===
==== Behind-the-scenes work ====
As a member of the 5th District Democrats, he has been a district committeeman, and the chairman of the King County Democrats endorsements committee. Willard worked behind the scenes on several campaigns including Joe Mallahan's recent Seattle mayoral campaign. Willard managed Oregon Democratic State Rep. Tim Josi's 1990 political campaign, and served as his legislative assistant during his freshman term for the 1991 session.

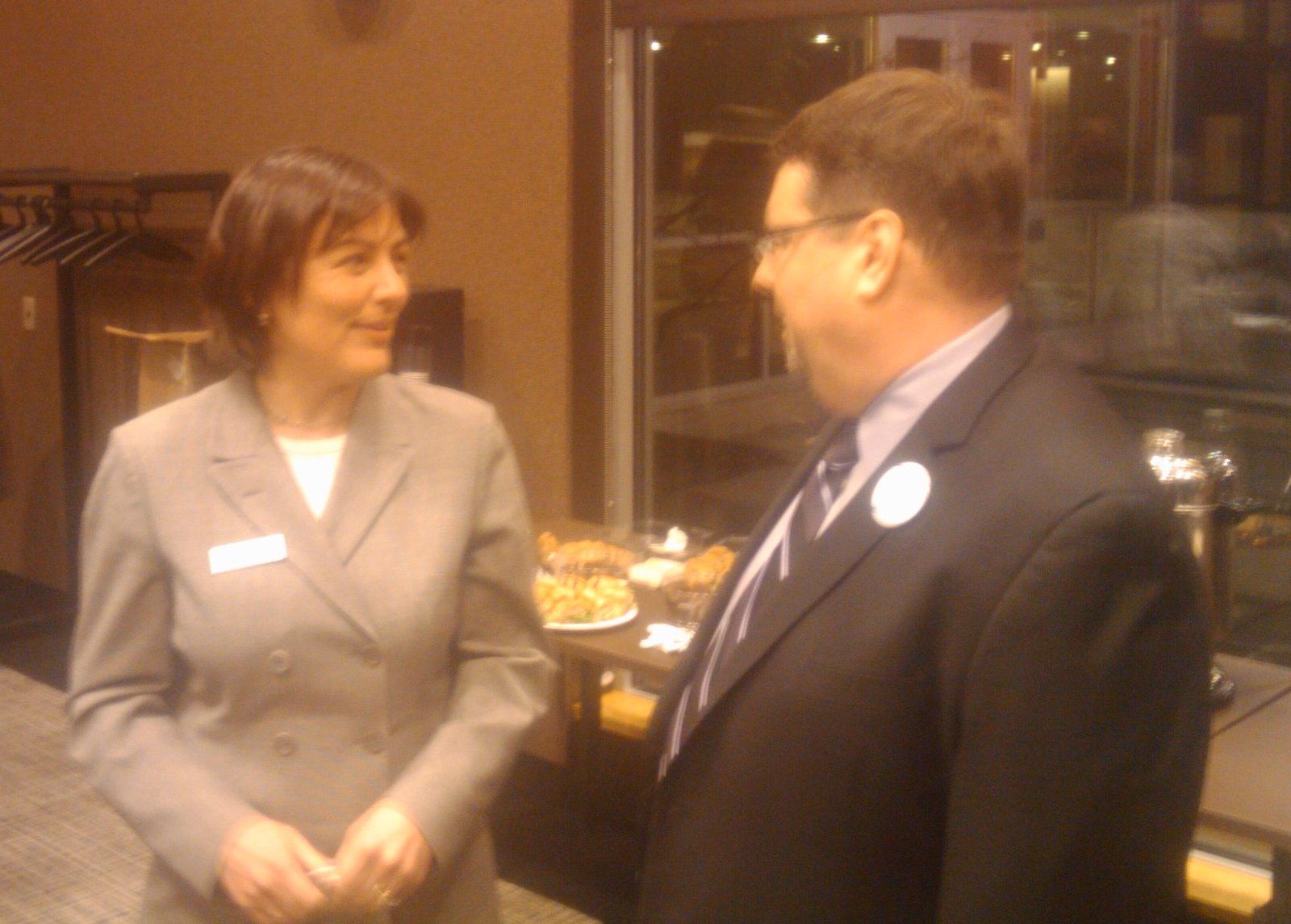
Willard and congress candidate Suzan DelBene.

==== 2010 Campaign for state representative ====
Willard challenged the incumbent, Representative Glenn Anderson, for position 2 in the 5th Legislative District on the grounds that the constituents are not well represented in the all-Republican district. The district has changed over the last ten years since his opponent was first elected. His platform issues includes tax reform and funding for schools. He has criticized the current tax system as over-reliant on sales taxes and as regressive. He has also criticized the Business and Occupation Tax, calling it unfair to small businesses, and stated that exemptions on property tax often favor large businesses. Willard says that K-12 basic education is in a very poor state due to the lack of proper funding. Willard cites his corporate and entrepreneurial experience as a means to solve the state's ongoing budget crisis, with stated goals of promoting economic development and improving the public school system. Willard was endorsed by the 5th Legislative District.

==== 2011 Campaign for Seattle Port Commissioner ====
Willard ran against incumbent Republican Bill Bryant but lost by more than 20 percentage points. Will "Walkin' Will" Knedlik withdrew from the race. Willard had endorsements from the 5th Dems and the 37th Dems.

=== Community service ===
Willard is on the board of directors for the Seattle Youth Symphony, the steering committee for Treehouse for Kids Golf Tournament, and the Washington Community For Self-Help Gala.

== See also ==
- Washington State House elections, 2010
