= Norm Johnson (politician) =

American politician from Washington

Member of the Washington House of Representatives from the 14th district
- In office January 12, 2009 – January 14, 2019
- Preceded by: Mary Skinner
- Succeeded by: Chris Corry

Personal details
- Born: Norman Martin Johnson; July 29, 1938 (age 88) Toppenish, Washington, U.S.
- Party: Republican
- Education: Washington State University (BA); Central Washington University (BA); Heritage University (MA)

Norman Martin Johnson (born July 29, 1938) is an American politician of the Republican Party. He was a member of the Washington House of Representatives, representing the 14th district.

== Awards ==
- 2014 Guardians of Small Business award. Presented by NFIB.
