= Christopher Hurst (politician) =

American politician from Washington

Member of the Washington House of Representatives from the 31st district
- In office January 8, 2007 – January 9, 2017
- Preceded by: Jan Shabro
- Succeeded by: Morgan Irwin
- In office January 11, 1999 – January 13, 2003
- Preceded by: Les Thomas
- Succeeded by: Jan Shabro

Personal details
- Born: Christopher Arthur Hurst; October 12, 1954 (age 71) Seattle, Washington, U.S.
- Party: Independent Democratic (2011–present)
- Other political affiliations: Democratic (before 2011)
- Spouse: April Hurst (m. 1979)
- Children: 2
- Profession: police detective pilot and flight instructor
- Website: Official

Christopher Arthur Hurst (born October 12, 1954) is an American politician of the Democratic Party who served as a member of the Washington House of Representatives, representing the 31st Legislative District from 1999 to 2003 and again from 2007 to 2017.
