= The Missing and Murdered Indigenous Women's and People's Alert System =

2022 Washington State law

The Missing and Murdered Indigenous Women's and People's Alert System is the first nationwide alert system for missing Indigenous people in the United States (House Bill 1725). On 31 March 2022, Washington State Governor Jay Inslee signed 6 bills into law, 2 of which focus on helping missing Indigenous people that will take effect June 9. This bill, originally proposed by Washington Attorney General Bob Ferguson, is an Amber-Alert-type system that notifies police and other public broadcasting systems (such as highway billboards, social media, and radio stations) in local and regional areas when a report has been made by a family member of a missing Indigenous person. Washington State has a similar "Silver Alert" for vulnerable adults who have gone missing. While the alert system includes Indigenous men and children, it has a primary focus on Indigenous women, since "the crisis began as a women's issue, and it remains primarily a women's issue." according to public testimony.

== Influences ==
The bill's head sponsor, Debra Lekanoff, is a member of the Aleut and Tlingit tribe of Washington State. She is quoted saying "It's not just an Indian issue, it's not just an Indian responsibility. Our sisters, our aunties, our grandmothers are going missing every day...and it's been going on for far too long." This social problem of missing and murdered Indigenous women is not new, with organizations like No More Stolen Sisters or Missing and Murdered Indigenous Women (MMIW) fighting to bring light to this issue, but having difficulty doing so, as it is not very present in mainstream media. Native Women's Wilderness states that, as of 2016, the National Crime Information Center has reported more than 5,700 cases of missing Indigenous women in the United States. In addition, The United States Department Of Justice has only reported 116 cases. Additionally, the Sovereign Bodies Institute (an Indigenous advocacy group) conducted a search for missing Indigenous women and uncovered 18 cases of missing or murdered Indigenous women, and found that an estimated 62% of them were not listed in state or federal databases for missing persons. Additionally, the Urban Indian Health Institute identified 506 unique cases of missing and murdered American Indian and Alaska Native women and girls across the 71 selected cities—128 (25%) were missing persons cases, 280 (56%) were murder cases, and 98 (19%) had an unknown status, and 75% had no listed tribal affiliation. It is also important to note that Seattle, Washington has the highest number of murdered Indigenous people in the United States (38 murders), and Tacoma, Washington has the highest number of missing Indigenous people in the United States (13 missing).

On October 31, 2025, human remains found earlier that year in June were confirmed to be that of Tulalip woman Mary Johnson-Davis. Johnson-Davis' November 2020 disappearance and subsequent media coverage had spurred the writing of House Bill 1725. Johnson-Davis' sisters Gerry Davis and Nona Blouin had been involved in attempts to have her disappearance investigated. They named additional struggles in the handling of her case including law enforcement jurisdictions on tribal land and correct identification of their races affecting crime data; as the family is of both Native and French-Canadian descent.

In 2022, Washington State Patrol tribal liasion Patti Gosch had also named this as an issue, stating most people on the initial version of the Washington missing Indigenous persons list had been incorrectly listed as a different race. Abigail Echo-hawk, Executive Vice President of the Seattle Indian Health Board, also mentioned similar issues of inaccurate racial identity data being entered by law enforcement agencies.

Cities with Most Murders of Indigenous Women	Cities with Most Missing Indigenous Women	Areas with Most Missing Indigenous Women
Seattle, WA (38)	Tacoma, WA (13)	Anchorage, AK (6)
Tucson, AZ (30)	Gallup, NM (12)	Tulsa, OK (5)
Anchorage, AK (27)	Omaha, NE (11)	Farmington/San Juan County, NM (5)
Salt Lake City, UT (22)	Phoenix, AZ (8)	Gallup/McKinleyCounty, NM (5)
Albuquerque, NM (16)	Seattle, WA (7)	Seattle/King County, WA (5)
Billings, MT (16)	Minneapolis/St. Paul, MN (6)	Robeson County, NC (4)
Minneapolis/St. Paul, MN (10)	Billings, MT (5)	Albuquerque, NM (3)
Tacoma, WA (10)	Tulsa, OK (4)	Fairbanks, AK (3)
Gallup, NM (9)	Albuquerque, NM (3)	Lawton, OK (3)
Denver, CO (8)	Anchorage, AK (3)	Tacoma/Pierce County, WA (3)
Chicago, IL (7)	Fairbanks, AK (3)	Coconino County, AZ (3)
Oklahoma City, OK (7)	Farmington, NM (3)	Muskogee County, OK (3)
Phoenix, AZ (6)	Rapid City, SD (3)	

Data collected from Urban Indian Health Institute

=== Statistics on Missing and Murdered Indigenous Women ===
All statistics retrieved from NativeWomensWildreness.org

- Indigenous Women (girls +) are murdered 10x higher than all other ethnicities.
- Murder is the 3rd leading cause of death for Indigenous Women (Centers for Disease Control).
- More than 4 out of 5 Indigenous Women have experienced violence (84.3%) (National Institute of Justice Report).
- More than half of Indigenous Women experience sexual violence (56.1%).
- More than half of Indigenous Women have been physically abused by their intimate partners (55.5 percent).
- less than half of Indigenous Women have been stalked in their lifetime (48.8 percent).
- Indigenous Women are 1.7 times more likely than Anglo-American women to experience violence.
- Indigenous Women are 2xs more likely to be raped than Anglo-American white women.
- The murder rate of Indigenous Women is 3xs higher than Anglo-American women.

== Additional Bill ==
In addition to the Missing and Murdered Indigenous Women's and Peoples Alert System being signed into law, another bill was signed as well. This bill requires county coroners as well as medical examiners to identify and notify family members of a murdered Indigenous person. This is relevant because a number of murdered Indigenous people are mistakenly identified as Hispanic if identified at all. This seems to create an issue due to Indigenous cultural or religious rituals or ceremonies that commonly take place following an Indigenous death. Additionally, it can help bring closure to families who have lost someone, rather than never knowing what happened to them.

== Moving Forward ==
Moving forward, Washington States initiative to implement this system is likely to create a domino effect on other states. Oregon, Wisconsin, and Arizona have all taken action to increase visibility of missing and murdered Indigenous people and women. This seems to be gaining traction at the national level too, as the United States Department Of The Interior partnered with the Bureau of Indian Affairs and Operation Lady Justice Initiative launched a unit named the Missing and Murdered Unit in April 2021, implemented by the Biden Administration to solve cases of missing Indigenous people that have gone cold. So far, they have put together 7 teams staffed with criminal investigators, tribal law enforcement, and the United States Department of Justice.
