= Lauren Davis (politician) =

American politician from Washington

Member of the Washington House of Representatives from the 32nd district
- Incumbent
- Assumed office January 14, 2019 Serving with Cindy Ryu
- Preceded by: Ruth Kagi

Personal details
- Born: 1986 (age 39–40)
- Party: Democratic
- Education: Brown University
- Occupation: Non-Profit Executive, politician

Lauren Davis (born 1986) is a member of the Washington House of Representatives, representing the 32nd legislative district.

== Career ==
Davis is the Executive Director of the Washington Recovery Alliance, a role she took on after helping found the organization. She has also worked at the Bill & Melinda Gates Foundation and helped develop school suicide prevention programs. She was a Fulbright fellow in Ghana and has taught graduate level social work classes at the University of Washington.

Before entering policy Davis was a caretaker for a friend, which inspired her to be the citizen co-sponsor behind HB1713, also known as Ricky's Law. The bill was named after her friend.

In 2018, Ruth Kagi, Davis's predecessor, announced that she was not going to seek reelection. During this election, the three main candidates were Davis, Democrat and Shoreline City Council Member Chris Roberts, and Republican Frank Deisler. Davis won 74.4% of the vote against Deisler.

In 2020, Davis ran for a second term in office, gaining 79.39% of the vote against independent Tamra Smilanich. During her second term in office, Davis was involved in creating Washington state's 988 Suicide and Crisis Lifeline, as well as expanding funding for substance abuse services and domestic violence victims.

In 2022, Davis ran for a third term in office, winning 79.5% of the vote against Republican challenger Anthony Hubbard. In 2023, Davis created HB1715, which looked to expand protections for victims of domestic violence. In May 2023, the bill was signed into law by Governor Jay Inslee.

In 2026, Davis ran for a fifth term in office, against Democrat Imraan Siddiqi.
