= Geoff Simpson =

American politician from Washington

Member of the Washington House of Representatives from the 47th district
- In office January 8, 2001 – January 10, 2011
- Preceded by: Phil Fortunato
- Succeeded by: Mark Hargrove

Personal details
- Born: Washington
- Party: Democratic
- Education: Saint Louis School (Honolulu, HI)
- Occupation: firefighter, small business owner

Military service
- Allegiance: United States of America
- Branch/service: United States Navy
- Years of service: 1981-1986
- Rank: E-5

Geoffrey H. Simpson is an American firefighter and politician who served as a member of the Washington House of Representatives, representing the 47th district from 2001 to 2011. A member of the Democratic Party, Simpson previously served as a member of the City Council of Covington, Washington and as Mayor Pro Tempore of Covington.

== Political career ==
Simpson is a member of the Transportation Committee, the Insurance, Financial Services, and Consumer Protection Committee, and the Local Government Committee, where he serves as chairman.

Simpson's legislative career has focused on several key issues and problems. The second bill Simpson introduced after being elected to the state legislature was to equalize the penalty for hit-and-run death with the penalty for vehicular homicide involving alcohol. Simpson's inspiration for the legislation came from a first-hand experience as a Kent firefighter when he was dispatched to the scene of a hit-and-run that resulted in the death of Carol Thueringer. Simpson also sponsored HB 2713 which expanded the state database of DNA samples from criminals primarily convicted of sex-related offenses.

In the wake of reports of price gouging by various merchants around the state of Washington after the September 11, 2001 attack on America, Simpson introduced legislation to protect consumers from the practice. In January 2003, Rep. Simpson introduced legislation to regulate the practice referred to as "dead peasants insurance" whereby corporations purchased life insurance on employees without that employee's knowledge or consent.

On January 19, 2004, Simpson introduced HB 2660 which was signed into law and required a DUI offender to install an ignition interlock device as a condition of restoration of their driving rights. The legislation was hailed by Mothers Against Drunk Driving (MADD) as the first of its kind in the nation.

In February 2005, Simpson introduced a bill that passed the Washington State House focused on offering financial incentives for state employees who choose to purchase prescription drugs from Canada. The bill authorized state agencies to buy prescription drugs directly from Canada pending FDA approval. Governor Gary Locke created a Washington State website to assist residents in purchasing drugs from Canada.

In the 2006 legislative session Simpson supported HB 2292, which regulated medical malpractice by focusing on patient safety, insurance industry reform, and health care liability reform by reducing cost of dispute resolution without infringing on fundamental rights of individuals.

In the 2010 legislative session, Simpson was the prime sponsor for HB's 2830 and 2831 which increased regulatory tools for the Department of Financial Institutions to intervene when financial institutions were in financial trouble. The legislation increases the Department's ability to suspend officers who commit fraud and the ability to impose civil fines on law-breakers. Simpson also sponsored HB 2739 in the 2010 session, the House companion of a new law to increase the safety of children in school crosswalk zones by allowing crossing guards to report vehicles driving dangerously to police who can issue double fines after investigation.

== Associations and Endorsements ==
In 2003 Simpson was declared Legislator of the Year by the Washington Council of Police and Sheriffs.

In May 2006, Simpson was awarded the 2006 Community Champion Award from Futurewise.

In 2008, Simpson was endorsed by the Sierra Club for his work on the House Transportation Committee.

== Personal life ==
Prior to elective office, Simpson served in the United States Navy and as a Boeing firefighter for 5 years. He has been a firefighter for the Kent, Washington Fire Department since September 1990 and is the former owner of a small business. He attended Bellevue Community College, Edmonds Community College, and Highline Community College. He was named a "Certified Municipal Leader" by the Association of Washington Cities in 2000. He has three children.

In October 2003, Simpson was dispatched to the scene of a murder where at least one victim was identified and a severely wounded 7-year-old girl was found. Simpson and three other fire fighters entered the scene without police backup to rescue the girl and provide medical assistance. The four fire fighters were honored for their heroism with departmental Distinguished Service Awards.

=== Domestic violence ===
On April 27, 2008, Simpson was arrested and charged in King County District Court with fourth-degree assault and interfering with a domestic violence report after an alleged altercation with his ex-wife. Simpson immediately declared the charges "unwarranted" and predicted his exoneration. On May 28, 2008, the prosecutor in the case dropped the charges against Simpson, saying that he "no longer believes there is sufficient evidence to proceed with the charges."

On July 9, 2010 the Seattle City Attorney's office charged Rep. Simpson with one count of assault stemming from an alleged incident of domestic violence at Seattle Children's Hospital on May 22, 2010. According to news sources, "A social worker told police she saw Simpson "barrel" into the room, push the former wife and shut the door. He 'closed the blinds and barricaded himself inside using his body' and was yelling inside, according to the report. Once he came out, he left the property, witnesses said."

== Electoral history ==
Washington House of Representatives, 47th District
Year	Democrat	Votes	Pct	Republican	Votes	Pct	Libertarian	Votes	Pct
2000	Geoffrey Simpson	21,989	50.15%	Phil Fortunato	21,856	49.85%			
2002	Geoffrey Simpson	16,666	51.55%	Phil Fortunato	15,665	48.45%			
2004	Geoffrey Simpson	26,152	51.79%	Steve Altick	23,396	46.33%	Duane Grindstaff	952	1.89%
2006	Geoffrey Simpson	22,210	59.66%	Donna Watts	15,016	40.34%			
2008	Geoffrey Simpson	27,439	52.62%	Mark Hargrove	24,707	47.38%			
2010	Geoffrey Simpson	19,943	43.67%	Mark Hargrove	25,728	56.33%			
