= 2016 Washington gubernatorial election =

- November 8, 2016
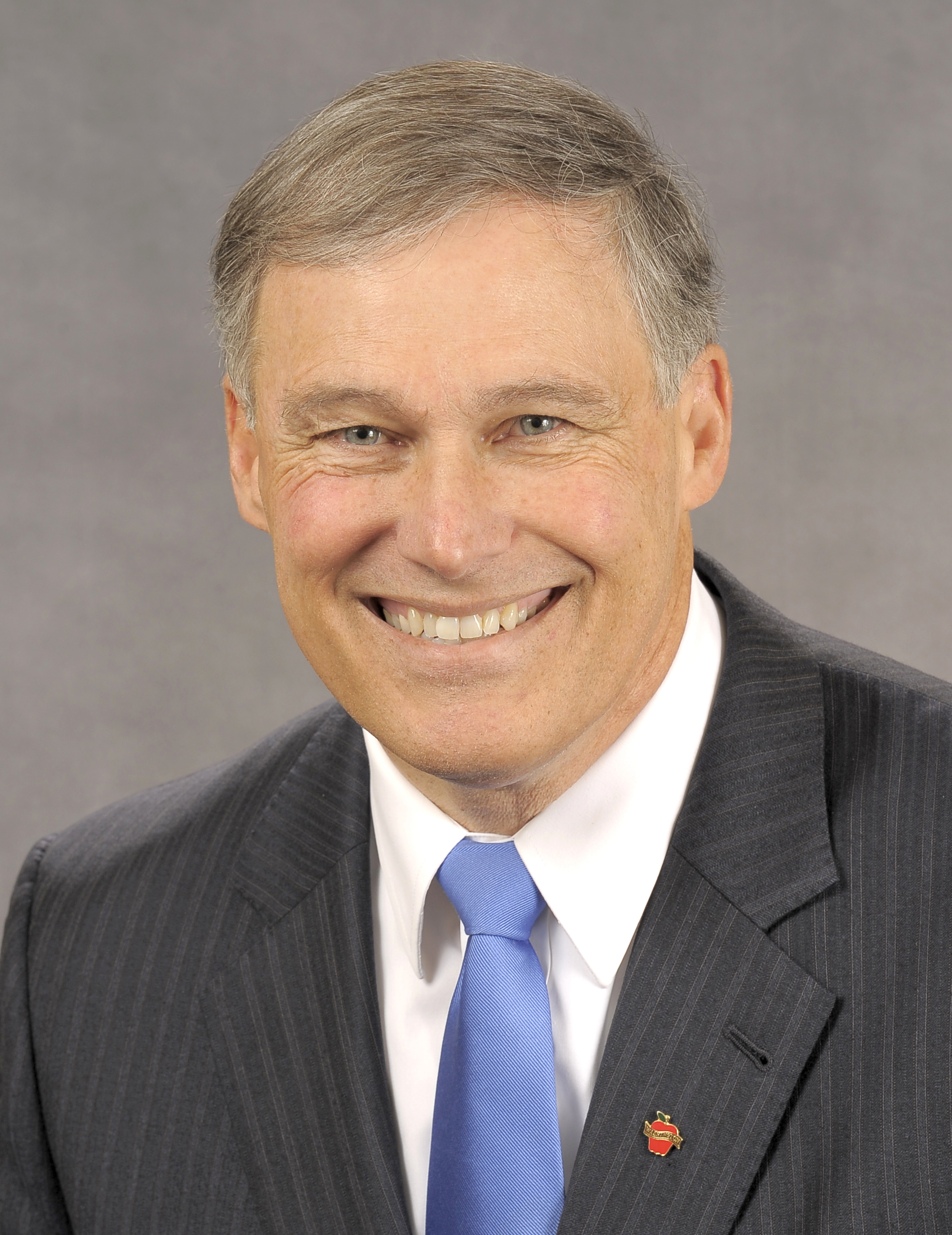

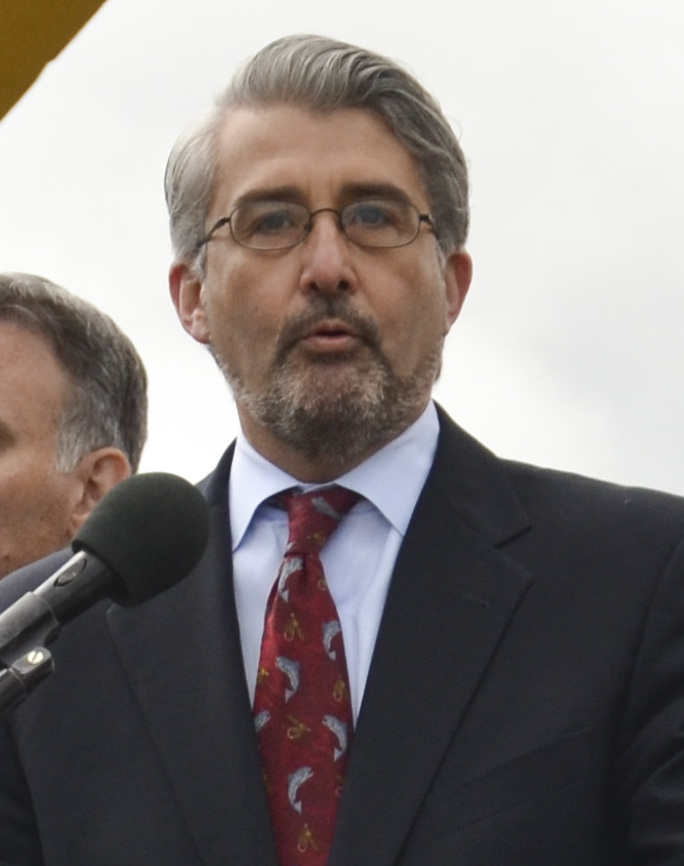
Candidate	Jay Inslee	Bill Bryant
Party	Democratic	Republican
Popular vote	1,760,520	1,476,346
Percentage	54.25%	45.49%
- Inslee: 40–50% 50–60% 60–70% 70–80% 80–90% >90% Bryant: 50–60% 60–70% 70–80% 80–90% >90% Tie: 50% No data
Governor before election
Jay Inslee
Democratic
Elected Governor
Jay Inslee
Democratic

The 2016 Washington gubernatorial election was held on November 8, 2016.

Under Washington's top-two primary law, all candidates appear on the same ballot, regardless of party. In the August 2 primary, residents voted for one of several candidates from a range of party affiliations. The top two finishers, incumbent Governor Jay Inslee (Democratic) and Port of Seattle Commissioner Bill Bryant (Republican), moved on to the November general election, which Inslee won.

Pacific County voted for a Republican gubernatorial candidate for the first time since 1964 and Grays Harbor County did so for the first time since 1924. As of 2026, this was the last gubernatorial election in Washington in which the margin of victory was within single digits.

== Background ==
Democratic governor Christine Gregoire declined to seek a third term in 2012. Democratic former U.S. Representative Jay Inslee was elected to succeed her, defeating Republican Rob McKenna, the outgoing Attorney General of Washington, by 51.5% to 48.5%.

== Primary election ==
=== Democratic Party ===
==== Declared ====
- James Robert Deal
- Johnathan Dodds
- Jay Inslee, incumbent governor
- Patrick O'Rourke

=== Republican Party ===
==== Declared ====
- Bill Bryant, former Seattle Port Commissioner
- Goodspaceguy, perennial candidate
- Bill Hirt

==== Declined ====
- Andy Hill, state senator
- Steve Litzow, state senator (running for reelection)
- Rob McKenna, former Attorney General of Washington and candidate for governor in 2012
- Dave Reichert, U.S. Representative for Washington's 8th congressional district (ran for reelection)

=== Third Party and independent candidates ===
==== Declared ====
- David Blomstrom (Fifth Republic)
- Christian Joubert (Holistic)
- Mary Martin (Socialist Workers)
- Steve Rubenstein (Independent)

==== Declined ====
- Randy Dorn, State Superintendent of Public Instruction

=== Polling ===
Hypothetical polling

with Inslee, Bryant, and Dorn

Poll source	Date(s) administered	Sample size	Margin of error	Jay Inslee (D)	Bill Bryant (R)	Randy Dorn (I)	Undecided
Elway Poll	April 14–17, 2016	503	± 3.5%	41%	26%	7%	25%

=== Results ===
County results Inslee: 40–50%; 60–70%; Bryant: 40–50%; 50–60%; 60–70%

Congressional district results Inslee: 40–50%; 50–60%; 60–70%; 70–80%; Bryant: 40–50%; 50–60%

Blanket primary results
Party	Candidate	Votes	%
Democratic	Jay Inslee (incumbent)	687,412	49.30
Republican	Bill Bryant	534,519	38.33
Republican	Bill Hirt	48,382	3.47
Democratic	Patrick O'Rourke	40,572	2.91
Independent	Steve Rubenstein	22,582	1.62
Democratic	James Robert Deal	14,623	1.05
Democratic	Johnathan Dodds	14,152	1.01
Republican	Goodspaceguy	13,191	0.95
Socialist Workers	Mary Martin	10,374	0.74
Independent	David Blomstrom	4,512	0.32
Independent	Christian Joubert	4,103	0.29
Total votes		1,394,422	100.00

==== By congressional district ====
District	Inslee	Bryant	Representative
1st	46%	43%	Suzan DelBene
2nd	50%	36%	Rick Larsen
3rd	40%	42%	Jaime Herrera Beutler
4th	31%	55%	Dan Newhouse
5th	38%	46%	Cathy McMorris Rodgers
6th	49%	38%	Derek Kilmer
7th	75%	17%	Jim McDermott
8th	40%	49%	Dave Reichert
9th	61%	28%	Adam Smith
10th	46%	41%	Denny Heck

== General election ==
=== Debates ===
- Complete video of debate, October 19, 2016 - C-SPAN

=== Predictions ===
Source	Ranking	As of
The Cook Political Report	Safe D	August 12, 2016
Daily Kos	Safe D	November 8, 2016
Rothenberg Political Report	Safe D	November 3, 2016
Sabato's Crystal Ball	Safe D	November 7, 2016
Real Clear Politics	Lean D	November 1, 2016
Governing	Likely D	November 7, 2016

=== Endorsements ===
Jay Inslee (D)

U.S Presidents

- Barack Obama, 44th President of the United States

Newspapers

- The News Tribune
- The Olympian
- The Seattle Times
- The Stranger
Bill Bryant (R)

U.S. Senators

- Slade Gorton, former U.S. Senator from Washington

U.S. Representatives

- Sid Morrison, former U.S. Representative from Washington's 4th congressional district
- Dan Newhouse, U.S. Representative from Washington's 4th congressional district

Statewide officials

- Dan Evans, 16th Governor of Washington and former U.S. Senator from Washington
- Rob McKenna, 17th Attorney General of Washington and runner up for governor in 2012

State legislators

- Jan Angel, state senator
- Mary Dye, state representative
- Curtis King, state senator
- Brad Klippert, state representative
- Matt Manweller, state representative
- Joe Schmick, state representative
- Maureen Walsh, state representative

Newspapers

- The Spokesman-Review
- Tri-City Herald
- Walla Walla Union-Bulletin
- Yakima Herald-Republic

=== Polling ===
Aggregate polls

Source of poll aggregation	Dates administered	Dates updated	Jay Inslee (D)	Bill Bryant (R)	Other/Undecided (Note: Calculated by taking the difference of 100% and all other candidates combined.)	Margin
Real Clear Politics	October 6 – November 2, 2016	November 2, 2016	50.7%	42.3%	7.0%	Inslee +8.4%

View source data.

Poll source	Date(s) administered	Sample size	Margin of error	Jay Inslee (D)	Bill Bryant (R)	Undecided
SurveyMonkey	November 1–7, 2016	1,451	± 4.6%	55%	42%	3%
Insights West	November 4–6, 2016	402	± 4.9%	49%	40%	10%
SurveyMonkey	October 31 – November 6, 2016	1,292	± 4.6%	55%	42%	3%
SurveyMonkey	October 28 – November 3, 2016	944	± 4.6%	56%	41%	3%
SurveyUSA	October 31 – November 2, 2016	667	± 3.9%	50%	43%	6%
SurveyMonkey	October 27 – November 2, 2016	807	± 4.6%	56%	41%	3%
SurveyMonkey	October 26 – November 1, 2016	698	± 4.6%	55%	41%	4%
SurveyMonkey	October 25–31, 2016	745	± 4.6%	55%	42%	3%
Elway Poll	October 20–22, 2016	502	± 4.5%	51%	39%	10%
KCTS 9/YouGov	October 6–13, 2016	750	± 4.4%	51%	45%	4%
Strategies 360/KOMO News	September 29 – October 3, 2016	500	± 4.4%	50%	40%	8%
Elway Poll	August 9–13, 2016	500	± 4.5%	48%	36%	16%
Moore Information	May 16–18, 2016	500	± 4.0%	43%	36%	18%
Elway Poll	April 14–17, 2016	503	± 3.5%	48%	36%	16%
Elway Poll	December 28–30, 2015	500	± 4.5%	39%	30%	31%
Public Policy Polling	May 14–17, 2015	879	± 3.3%	46%	34%	21%

Hypothetical polling

Jay Inslee vs. Andy Hill

Poll source	Date(s) administered	Sample size	Margin of error	Jay Inslee (D)	Andy Hill (R)	Undecided
Public Policy Polling	May 14–17, 2015	879	± 3.3%	45%	31%	24%

Jay Inslee vs. Rob McKenna

Poll source	Date(s) administered	Sample size	Margin of error	Jay Inslee (D)	Rob McKenna (R)	Undecided
Public Policy Polling	May 14–17, 2015	879	± 3.3%	43%	38%	19%

Jay Inslee vs. Dave Reichert

Poll source	Date(s) administered	Sample size	Margin of error	Jay Inslee (D)	Dave Reichert (R)	Undecided
Public Policy Polling	May 14–17, 2015	879	± 3.3%	45%	34%	22%

Jay Inslee vs. generic Republican

Poll source	Date(s) administered	Sample size	Margin of error	Jay Inslee (D)	Generic Republican	Undecided
Elway Poll	December 28–30, 2015	500	± 4.5%	30%	25%	45%

Jay Inslee vs. generic opponent

Poll source	Date(s) administered	Sample size	Margin of error	Jay Inslee (D)	Generic Opponent	Undecided
Moore Information	May 16–18, 2016	500	± 4.0%	38%	47%	15%
Moore Information	May 2015	500	± 4.0%	38%	44%	18%

Generic Democrat vs. generic Republican

Poll source	Date(s) administered	Sample size	Margin of error	Generic Democrat	Generic Republican	Other	Undecided
Moore Information	May 16–18, 2016	500	± 4.0%	41%	34%	5%	20%
Moore Information	May 2015	500	± 4.0%	34%	30%	16%	20%

=== Results ===
2016 Washington gubernatorial election
Party	Candidate	Votes	%	±%
Democratic	Jay Inslee (incumbent)	1,760,520	54.25%	+2.71%
Republican	Bill Bryant	1,476,346	45.49%	−2.97%
Write-in		8,416	0.26%	N/A
Total votes		3,245,282	100.00%	N/A
Democratic hold				

==== By county ====
County results
County	Jay Inslee Democratic		Bill Bryant Republican		Write-in Various		Margin		Total votes
County	#	%	#	%	#	%	#	%	Total votes
Adams	1,533	32.64%	3,151	67.10%	12	0.26%	-1,618	-34.45%	4,696
Asotin	4,149	42.46%	5,609	57.40%	13	0.13%	-1,460	-14.94%	9,771
Benton	31,128	37.95%	50,730	61.84%	172	0.21%	-19,602	-23.90%	82,030
Chelan	13,866	40.94%	19,934	58.86%	65	0.19%	-6,068	-17.92%	33,865
Clallam	19,354	48.87%	20,108	50.78%	140	0.35%	-754	-1.90%	39,602
Clark	96,032	47.93%	103,787	51.80%	560	0.28%	-7,755	-3.87%	200,379
Columbia	688	31.50%	1,491	68.27%	5	0.23%	-803	-36.77%	2,184
Cowlitz	19,593	42.75%	26,116	56.98%	124	0.27%	-6,523	-14.23%	45,833
Douglas	5,441	34.73%	10,197	65.09%	28	0.18%	-4,756	-30.36%	15,666
Ferry	1,360	37.56%	2,252	62.19%	9	0.25%	-892	-24.63%	3,621
Franklin	9,731	40.27%	14,387	59.54%	45	0.19%	-4,656	-19.27%	24,163
Garfield	370	29.65%	875	70.11%	3	0.24%	-505	-40.46%	1,248
Grant	9,242	32.16%	19,401	67.50%	99	0.34%	-10,159	-35.35%	28,742
Grays Harbor	14,038	48.43%	14,843	51.20%	107	0.37%	-805	-2.78%	28,988
Island	21,797	50.16%	21,560	49.61%	98	0.23%	237	0.55%	43,455
Jefferson	13,399	65.24%	7,049	34.32%	90	0.44%	6,350	30.92%	20,538
King	677,943	67.69%	321,242	32.07%	2,409	0.24%	356,701	35.61%	1,001,594
Kitsap	66,392	52.47%	59,762	47.23%	368	0.29%	6,630	5.24%	126,522
Kittitas	7,984	41.66%	11,139	58.13%	40	0.21%	-3,155	-16.46%	19,163
Klickitat	4,517	41.82%	6,260	57.96%	24	0.22%	-1,743	-16.14%	10,801
Lewis	11,163	32.09%	23,539	67.66%	86	0.25%	-12,376	-35.58%	34,788
Lincoln	1,616	27.92%	4,160	71.89%	11	0.19%	-2,544	-43.96%	5,787
Mason	13,126	45.92%	15,365	53.75%	93	0.33%	-2,239	-7.83%	28,584
Okanogan	7,437	43.06%	9,794	56.71%	39	0.23%	-2,357	-13.65%	17,270
Pacific	5,313	49.29%	5,428	50.36%	37	0.34%	-115	-1.07%	10,778
Pend Oreille	2,520	36.50%	4,364	63.21%	20	0.29%	-1,844	-26.71%	6,904
Pierce	176,825	49.94%	176,287	49.79%	953	0.27%	538	0.15%	354,065
San Juan	7,509	68.89%	3,356	30.79%	35	0.32%	4,153	38.10%	10,900
Skagit	28,273	49.47%	28,701	50.22%	173	0.30%	-428	-0.75%	57,147
Skamania	2,476	44.35%	3,094	55.42%	13	0.23%	-618	-11.07%	5,583
Snohomish	182,544	52.12%	166,770	47.61%	937	0.27%	15,774	4.50%	350,251
Spokane	106,009	45.87%	124,576	53.91%	508	0.22%	-18,567	-8.03%	231,093
Stevens	7,148	31.02%	15,851	68.79%	45	0.20%	-8,703	-37.77%	23,044
Thurston	71,835	54.67%	59,014	44.91%	559	0.43%	12,821	9.76%	131,408
Wahkiakum	941	39.89%	1,413	59.90%	5	0.21%	-472	-20.01%	2,359
Walla Walla	10,705	41.77%	14,880	58.06%	44	0.17%	-4,175	-16.29%	25,629
Whatcom	62,634	56.45%	47,953	43.22%	370	0.33%	14,681	13.23%	110,957
Whitman	8,727	49.41%	8,892	50.35%	43	0.24%	-165	-0.93%	17,662
Yakima	35,162	44.96%	43,016	55.00%	34	0.04%	-7,854	-10.04%	78,212
Totals	1,760,520	54.25%	1,476,346	45.49%	8,416	0.26%	284,174	8.76%	3,245,282

Counties that flipped from Democratic to Republican

- Grays Harbor (largest city: Aberdeen)
- Pacific (largest city: Raymond)

Counties that flipped from Republican to Democratic

- Island (largest city: Oak Harbor)
- Kitsap (largest city: Bremerton)
- Pierce (largest city: Tacoma)

==== By congressional district ====
Inslee won six of ten congressional districts.

District	Inslee	Bryant	Representative
1st	51%	49%	Suzan DelBene
2nd	57%	43%	Rick Larsen
3rd	45%	55%	Jaime Herrera Beutler
4th	40%	60%	Dan Newhouse
5th	44%	56%	Cathy McMorris Rodgers
6th	54%	46%	Derek Kilmer
7th	78%	22%	Jim McDermott
7th	78%	22%	Pramila Jayapal
8th	46%	54%	Dave Reichert
9th	67%	33%	Adam Smith
10th	53%	47%	Denny Heck
