= Cheryl Hymes =

American politician

Member of the Washington House of Representatives from the 40th district
- In office 1995–1997
- Succeeded by: Jeff Morris

Personal details
- Born: 1954 (age 71–72) Texas
- Party: Republican
- Education: University of Nebraska–Lincoln

Cheryl Hymes (born 1954) was an American politician. She was a Republican, representing District 40 in the Washington House of Representatives which included parts of Skagit, San Juan, and part of Whatcom County, from 1995 to 1997. Hymes served as vice-chair of the House Health Committee during her time in the legislature.
