= Charles Ross (Washington politician) =

American funeral director and politician from Washington

Member of the Washington House of Representatives from the 14th district
- In office January 8, 2007 – December 31, 2014
- Preceded by: James Clements
- Succeeded by: Gina Mosbrucker

Personal details
- Born: Portsmouth, Virginia, U.S.
- Party: Republican
- Spouse: CarriAnn Ross
- Children: 2
- Education: Mt. Hood Community College; Yakima Valley College

Military service
- Allegiance: United States
- Branch/service: United States Navy
- Years of service: 1990–1994

Charles R. Ross is an American funeral director and politician from Washington. Ross is a Republican Party member of the Washington House of Representatives, representing the 14th district.

== Career ==
In 1990 after graduating from Naches Valley High School, he enlisted in the United States Navy on August 27. After completing his basic training in San Diego, CA he was assigned to VAQ-134 an Electronic Warfare Squadron of EA-6B’s based at NAS Whidbey Island. In November 1992 he deployed with his squadron onboard the aircraft carrier USS Kitty Hawk (CV-63). During this West Pac he participated in Operation Restore Hope off the coast of Somalia and then moved to the Persian Gulf to conduct combat operations in Southern Iraq. He was awarded the Joint Meritorious Unit Award, Meritorious Unit Commendation, Armed Forces Expeditionary Medal, National Defense Medal and the Southwest Asia Service Medal. Ross was honorably discharged from active duty on June 15, 1994.

In 1996, Ross became a funeral director.

In 2006, Ross won the election and became a Republican Party member of the Washington House of Representatives for District 14. In 2014 Ross was elected Yakima County Auditor

== Awards ==
- 2014 Guardians of Small Business award. Presented by NFIB.
- 2007, 2012 Cornerstone Award presented by the Association of Washington Business (AWB)
- Legislator of the Year from the Washington Council of Police and Sheriffs (WACOPS), 2008
- 2016 County Auditor of the Year presented by the Washington Secretary of State for providing outstanding election services.

== Personal life ==
Ross' wife is CarriAnn Ross. They have two children. Ross and his family life in Naches, Washington.
