= Alex Ramel =

American politician and activist

Member of the Washington House of Representatives from the 40th district
- Incumbent
- Assumed office January 6, 2020 Serving with Debra Lekanoff
- Preceded by: Jeff Morris

Personal details
- Born: 1977 (age 48–49) Denver, Colorado, U.S.
- Party: Democratic
- Education: Western Washington University

Alexander W. Ramel (born 1977) is an American politician and activist serving as a member of the Washington House of Representatives from the 40th district, which includes San Juan County and portions of Whatcom and Skagit Counties.

== Early life and education ==
Ramel was born and raised in Denver, Colorado. He earned a Bachelor of Arts in Environmental Policy and Planning from the Huxley College of the Environment at Western Washington University.

== Career ==
Prior to entering politics, Ramel worked as a community organizer in Bellingham, Washington. He served as President of the Kulshan Community Land Trust. After the resignation of incumbent Democrat Jeff Morris, Ramel was appointed to fill out the remainder of his term. He took office on January 6, 2020, and was retained in the office in the November 2020 general election.

== Awards ==
- 2021 City Champion Awards. Presented by Association of Washington Cities (AWC).
