= Bill Bryant (politician) =

American politician (born 1957)

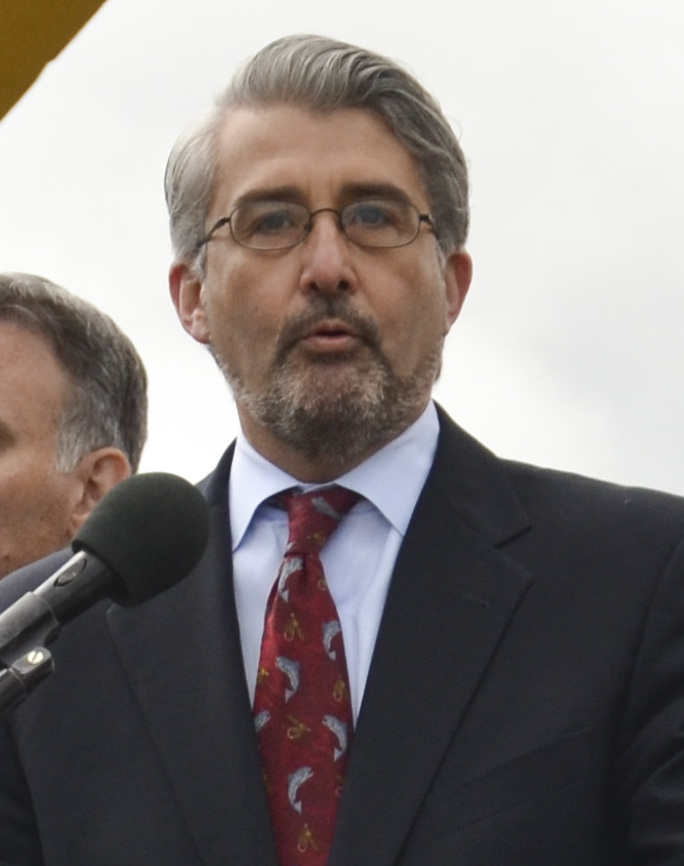
- Bryant in 2012

Member of the Seattle Port Commission Position 5
- In office January 1, 2008 – January 1, 2016
- Preceded by: Alec Fisken
- Succeeded by: Fred Felleman

Personal details
- Born: William Lee Bryant Jr. June 20, 1957 (age 69) Morton, Washington, U.S.
- Party: Republican
- Spouse: Barbara Feasey (m. 1989)
- Education: Georgetown University (BS)

William Lee Bryant Jr. (born June 20, 1957) is an American businessman and politician from the state of Washington. A Republican, he served on the Seattle Port Commission from 2008 to 2016. In the 2016 Washington gubernatorial election, as one of the top two finishers in the blanket primary, he participated in the general election, losing to incumbent Democrat Jay Inslee.

== Early life and education ==
Bryant was born in Morton, Washington, and attended Capital High School in Olympia. He earned a degree in trade and diplomacy from Georgetown University's School of Foreign Service.

== Political career ==
Bryant was first elected to the Port of Seattle Commission in 2007, narrowly defeating incumbent Alec Fisken. He was reelected in 2011 against Democrat Dean Willard with over 60% of the vote, a remarkable share for a Republican in King County.

=== Gubernatorial campaign ===
On May 14, 2015, Bryant announced his campaign for Governor of Washington in the 2016 election, running as a Republican. He has made reduction of traffic congestion and traffic noise on the 520 bridge as major goals of his campaign. Bryant also supported same-sex marriage as well as abortion rights and opposed capital punishment, placing him in the socially liberal faction of the Republican Party, while opposing raising the statewide minimum wage, making him fiscally conservative. On November 8, 2016, Bryant lost the election to incumbent Democrat Jay Inslee, receiving 45.5% of the vote to Inslee's 54.2%. Bryant won 30 of 39 counties, with many of his greatest margins in Washington's most rural areas. Inslee won 68% of the vote in King County, Washington's largest, which proved decisive. Bryant remains the last Republican gubernatorial candidate in Washington to come within single digits of winning.

Party political offices
Preceded by Rob McKenna	Republican nominee for Governor of Washington; 2016	Succeeded by Loren Culp
