= Cathy Dahlquist =

American politician from Washington

Member of the Washington House of Representatives from the 31st district
- In office January 10, 2011 – January 12, 2015
- Preceded by: Dan Roach
- Succeeded by: Drew Stokesbary

Personal details
- Born: October 22, 1960 (age 65)
- Party: Republican
- Education: University of Alabama, Tuscaloosa

Catherine C. Dahlquist (born October 22, 1960) is an American politician who served as a member of the Washington House of Representatives, representing the 31st district from 2011 to 2015. A member of the Republican Party, she was a candidate for the Washington State Senate in 2014, losing in the general election.
