= Drew Stokesbary =

American politician (born 1985)

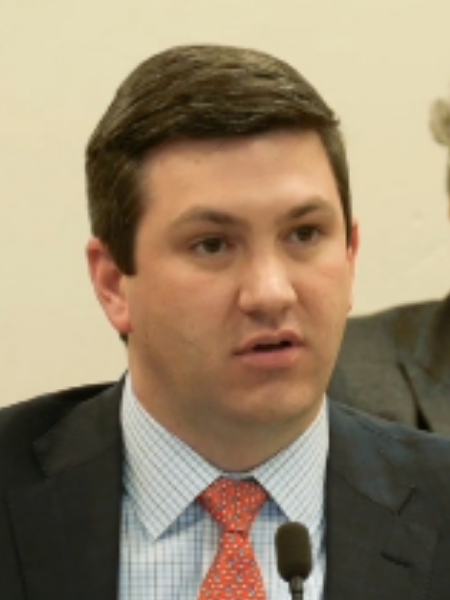

Minority Leader of the Washington House of Representatives
- Incumbent
- Assumed office April 23, 2023
- Preceded by: J. T. Wilcox

Member of the Washington House of Representatives from the 31st district
- Incumbent
- Assumed office January 12, 2015 Serving with Josh Penner
- Preceded by: Cathy Dahlquist

Personal details
- Born: Andrew Ryan Stokesbary; 1985 (age 40–41) Washington, U.S.
- Party: Republican
- Education: Duke University (BA); University of Notre Dame (JD)
- Website: State House website

Andrew Ryan Stokesbary (born 1985) is an American attorney and politician. He serves in the Washington House of Representatives, where he is currently the ranking Republican member on the House Appropriations Committee. During his second term, he was elected Minority Floor Leader. He also sits on the House Finance Committee.

Stokesbary was first elected in 2014, defeating Democrat Mike Sando. He previously worked as an aide to Pete von Reichbauer, a King County councilmember.

In 2019, Stokesbary introduced legislation that would permit NCAA athletes enrolled at Washington colleges to receive compensation. Similar bills were subsequently filed in California and Colorado, and by Congressman Mark Walker (R-NC).

Stokesbary reportedly considered running for Governor of Washington in 2020.

Following J. T. Wilcox's resignation from the position, Stokesbary became the Washington House Minority Leader after the close of the 2023 legislative session.

== Personal life ==
Stokesbary lives with his wife and two sons in Auburn. He is a graduate of Duke University, where he was the Blue Devil mascot, and Notre Dame Law School. Outside of the Legislature, he works as a lawyer for startups and emerging companies and sits on the board of the Auburn Valley YMCA.

== Electoral history ==
State Representative, Legislative District 31 (Pos. 1) – 2014 General Election
Party	Candidate	Votes	%	±%
Republican	Drew Stokesbary	24,190	61.03%	
Democratic	Mike Sando	15,446	38.97%	

State Representative, Legislative District 31 (Pos. 1) – 2016 General Election
Party	Candidate	Votes	%	±%
Republican	Drew Stokesbary (Incumbent)	42,776	71.59%	
Libertarian	John Frostad	16,976	28.41%	

State Representative, Legislative District 31 (Pos. 1) – 2018 General Election
Party	Candidate	Votes	%	±%
Republican	Drew Stokesbary (Incumbent)	36,844	58.92%	
Democratic	Victoria Mena	25,688	41.08%	

State Representative, Legislative District 31 (Pos. 1) – 2020 General Election
Party	Candidate	Votes	%	±%
Republican	Drew Stokesbary (Incumbent)	54,517	63.46%	
Democratic	Katie Young	31,306	36.44%	

Washington House of Representatives
Preceded by J. T. Wilcox	Minority Leader of the Washington House of Representatives; 2023–present	Incumbent
