= Cindy Ryu =

American politician

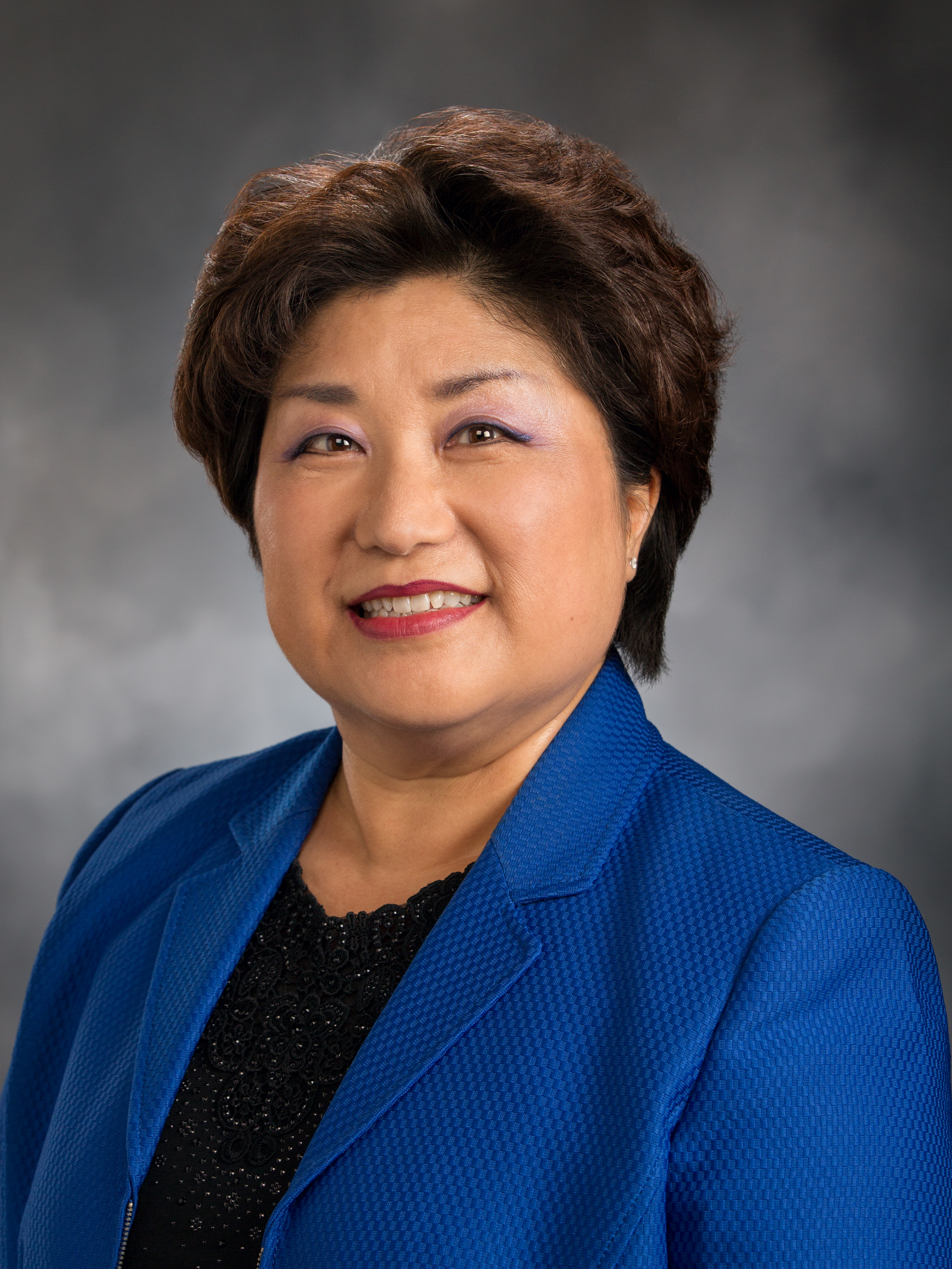

Member of the Washington House of Representatives from the 32nd district
- Incumbent
- Assumed office January 10, 2011 Serving with Lauren Davis
- Preceded by: Maralyn Chase

Personal details
- Born: Kim Sin Hi Seoul, South Korea
- Party: Democratic
- Spouse: Cody Ryu
- Education: University of Washington (BS, MBA)

Cindy Ryu (née Kim) is an American politician. A Democrat, she represents District 32 in the Washington House of Representatives. Ryu was the first Korean-American woman to be elected a mayor in the United States. She is the Chair of the Innovation, Community & Economic Development, and Veterans Committee and works on issues such as broadband deployment, catalytic converter thefts, consumer protection, outdoor recreation funding, increasing housing supply, tourism, and resilience of small businesses, communities, infrastructure and the environment.

== Early life and education ==
Ryu was born in South Korea, then her family moved to Brunei and the Philippines before settling in Gate, Washington, in 1969. She graduated from Centralia High School in Centralia, Washington and went on to earn a Bachelor of Science in microbiology and a Master of Business Administration in operations management from the University of Washington.

== Career ==
While serving as a member of the Shoreline City Council, Ryu was elected mayor in 2008, becoming the first female Korean-American mayor in the United States. Cindy was president of both the Shoreline Chamber of Commerce and its Dollars For Scholars Chapter. She helped create Shoreline's Green Business Program.

Following a loss in her candidacy for Shoreline City Council, Ryu ran for a seat in the Washington House of Representatives for the 32nd legislative district in 2010. She faced Republican Art Coday and won the general election with 61.02% of the vote, becoming the first Korean-American woman to hold office in that chamber. Ryu served on the Community and Economic Development and Housing Committee during her first term in office.

In 2012, Ryu was re-elected, winning 69.9% of the vote against Republican challenger Randy Hayden. In her sophomore term as representative, Ryu was elected by her peers as the vice chair of the Business and Financial Services Committee. In 2014, Ryu ran unopposed. She was chair of the House Community Development, Housing and Tribal Affairs Committee.

In the 2016 election, Ryu defeated Republican challenger Alvin Rutlege, winning 76% of the vote. She was chair of the Members of Color Caucus and focused on increasing data privacy during her term as chair. In 2018, Ryu defeated Republican challenger Dio Boucsieguez, winning 75.8% of the vote. She was a member of the Appropriations committee. She also joined the Consumer Protection & Business committee.

In 2020, Ryu defeated Democratic challenger Shirley Sutton, winning 72.8% of the vote. She chaired the Community and Economic Development Committee.

In 2022, Ryu defeated Lori Theis, who was affiliated with the Election Integrity Party. Ryu won 82% of the vote. Ryu is the chair of the Innovation, Community & Economic Development, & Veterans Committee, as well as a member of the Appropriations and Consumer Protection & Business Committees. She is past Chair of Women In Government, a national organization of women state legislators. Ryu serves on the FCC Intergovernmental Advisory Committee and is the President of PNWER.org
