= Elizabeth Scott (politician) =

American politician and educator from Washington

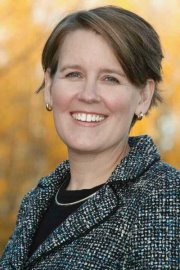
- Scott in 2010

Member of the Washington House of Representatives from the 39th district
- In office January 14, 2013 – January 9, 2017
- Preceded by: Kirk Pearson
- Succeeded by: John Koster

Personal details
- Born: Elizabeth K. Warfel; February 11, 1966 (age 60) Illinois
- Party: Republican
- Education: Southern Illinois University Carbondale; Seattle Pacific University
- Website: www.elizabethscottforcongress.com

Elizabeth K. Scott (née Warfel; born February 11, 1966) is an American politician and educator who served as member of the Washington House of Representatives, representing the 39th district from 2013 to 2017. A member of the Republican Party, she ran unsuccessfully for the state house in 2010 in the "heavily Democratic" 21st district, but since moved to the 39th district and was first elected to office there in 2012.

== Background ==
A self-identified strong proponent of individual rights and liberties, she has been a featured speaker at Tea Party events in Everett, Monroe, Olympia, and Puyallup from Tax Day 2009 until the present, speaking to audiences as large as four thousand people. In 2009, Scott served on the Edmonds Citizens' Levy Review Committee, where she argued against a proposed multimillion-dollar tax increase. A self-described "Midwest farm girl," Scott is also a member of the Washington State Farm Bureau, the National Rifle Association, and the Snohomish County Chapter of the Citizens' Alliance for Property Rights.

== 2010 Campaign ==
On July 4, Scott announced her candidacy for 21st Legislative District State Representative, position 2. In the top-two primary Scott bested two fellow candidates, a Republican and an independent, to advance to the general election against incumbent democrat Marko Liias. She was endorsed by state Republican leaders including then Attorney General Rob McKenna and U.S. Senate candidate Dino Rossi. In the general election, she reportedly won over 21,000 votes (45.6%), yet Liias still comfortably won by a margin of about 4,000 votes.

== State Legislator ==
After the 2010 loss, Scott moved to Monroe, in the more rural 39th legislative district. She ran for the open representative, position 2 seat left by Kirk Pearson, who was in turn running for the open state senate. Scott won second place in a crowded top-two primary against three Republicans and two Democrats, narrowly edging out Republican Monroe mayor Robert G. Zimmerman to face first place Eleanor Walters in the general election. Scott won the November election, 53% to Walters' 47%.

In her 2014 re-election bid Scott quadrupled her margin of victory from 6 percentage points to 24 (63% to 37%).

== Congressional Campaign ==
In 2015, Elizabeth Scott announced her candidacy for Washington's First Congressional District, held by incumbent Suzan DelBene. Scott campaigned for nearly 11 months before suspending her candidacy in May, 2016, citing health concerns. Scott was diagnosed with whooping cough earlier in 2016.

== Awards ==
- 2014 Guardians of Small Business award. Presented by NFIB.

== See also ==
- Washington's 39th Legislative District
- Washington State Legislature
- Washington House of Representatives
