= Mark Hargrove =

American pilot and politician from Washington

Member of the Washington House of Representatives from the 47th district
- In office January 10, 2011 – January 14, 2019
- Preceded by: Geoff Simpson
- Succeeded by: Debra Entenman

Personal details
- Born: Mark Donald Hargrove; November 25, 1956 (age 69) San Antonio, Texas, U.S.
- Party: Republican
- Spouse: Sandy Hargrove
- Children: 2
- Education: United States Air Force Academy
- Occupation: Pilot, educator, politician
- Military career
- Allegiance: United States
- Branch: United States Air Force

Mark Donald Hargrove (born November 25, 1956) is an American USAF pilot, commercial pilot instructor, educator, and politician from Washington. Hargrove is a former Republican member of Washington House of Representatives from 2011 to 2019.

== Early life ==
On November 21, 1956, Hargrove was born in San Antonio, Texas.

== Education ==
In 1979, Hargrove earned a Bachelor of Science degree in engineering mechanics from United States Air Force Academy.

== Career ==
In 1980, Hargrove became a C-141 pilot for the USAF, until 1984. In 1984, Hargrove became a math instructor for United States Air Force Academy Preparatory School, until 1987. In 1987, Hargrove became an instructor pilot for Boeing.

On November 2, 2010, Hargrove won an election and became a Republican member of the Washington House of Representatives for District 47, Position 1. Hargrove defeated Geoff Simpson with 56.33% of the votes. Hargrove began his term on January 10, 2011. On November 6, 2012, as an incumbent, Hargrove won the election and continued serving Washington House of Representatives for District 47, Position 1. Hargrove defeated Bud Sizemore with 50.15% of the votes. On November 4, 2014, as an incumbent, Hargrove won the election and continued serving Washington House of Representatives for District 47, Position 1. Hargrove defeated Chris Barringer with 55.67% of the votes. On November 8, 2016, as an incumbent, Hargrove won the election and continued serving Washington House of Representatives for District 47, Position 1. Hargrove defeated Brooke Valentine with 57.08% of the votes.

== Awards ==
- 2012 Cornerstone Award. Presented by the Association of Washington Business (AWB).
- 2014 Guardians of Small Business award. Presented by NFIB.
- 2019 The Tony LeVier Flight Test Safety Award. Presented by the Society of Experimental Test Pilots (SETP).

== Personal life ==
Hargrove's wife is Sandy Hargrove. They have two children. Hargrove and his family live in Covington, Washington.
