= Kirk Pearson (politician) =

American politician from Washington

Member of the Washington Senate from the 39th district
- In office January 14, 2013 – November 12, 2017
- Preceded by: Val Stevens
- Succeeded by: Keith Wagoner

Member of the Washington House of Representatives from the 39th, Position 2 district
- In office January 8, 2001 – January 14, 2013
- Preceded by: John Koster
- Succeeded by: Elizabeth Scott

Personal details
- Born: Kirk John Pearson; September 22, 1958 (age 68) Everett, Washington
- Party: Republican
- Education: Wenatchee Valley College (attended); Central Washington University (attended)
- Website: Official

Kirk John Pearson (born September 22, 1958) is an American politician. He was a member of the Washington State Senate from 2013 to 2017 and before that served as a member of the Washington House of Representatives from 2001 to 2013. In both positions he served as a member of the Republican Party representing the 39th district. It includes most of Snohomish and Skagit counties, as well as some of northern King County.

He previously served as Planning Commissioner for the City of Monroe from 1989 to 1992; and special assistant to U.S. representative Jack Metcalf. He is a past member of the Correctional Industries Board, the Pacific Fisheries Legislative Task Force, and Sentencing Guidelines Commission.

Pearson was raised in Monroe, Washington, where he graduated from Monroe High School in 1977. He attended Wenatchee Valley College and Central Washington University. He resigned as state senator in 2017 to become the state director of the United States Department of Agriculture's Office of Rural Development.
