= Washington's 40th legislative district =

Coordinates: 48°33′N 122°37′W

Map of Washington's 40th legislative district

Washington's 40th legislative district is one of forty-nine districts in Washington state for representation in the state legislature.

The district includes San Juan County as well as portions of Whatcom and Skagit counties.

The district's legislators are state senator Liz Lovelett and state representatives Debra Lekanoff (position 1) and Alex Ramel (position 2), all Democrats.

== See also ==
- Washington Redistricting Commission
- Washington State Legislature
- Washington State Senate
- Washington House of Representatives
