= Washington's 32nd legislative district =

American legislative district

Coordinates: 47°46′N 122°19′W

Map of Washington's 32nd legislative district

Washington's 32nd legislative district is one of forty-nine districts in Washington state for representation in the state legislature.

It includes the cities of Lynnwood, Edmonds (both in Snohomish County) and Shoreline (in King County).

The district's legislators are state senator Jesse Salomon and state representatives Cindy Ryu (position 1) and Lauren Davis (position 2), all Democrats.

== See also ==
- Washington Redistricting Commission
- Washington State Legislature
- Washington State Senate
- Washington House of Representatives
