= Washington's 14th legislative district =

American legislative district

Coordinates: 46°20′N 121°0′W

Washington's 14th legislative district map, after court-ordered redistricting in 2024

Washington's 14th legislative district is one of forty-nine districts in Washington state for representation in the state legislature.

Following the 2011 Washington State redistricting, The district includes all of Klickitat and Skamania counties, most of western Yakima County, and a slice of eastern Clark County.

This mostly rural district is represented by state senator Curtis King and state representatives Gloria Mendoza (position 1) and Deb Manjarrez (position 2), all Republicans.

The district boundaries were redrawn in 2024 following a court ordered that found that the existing borders violated Latino voting rights.

== See also ==
- Washington Redistricting Commission
- Washington State Legislature
- Washington State Senate
- Washington House of Representatives
