= Washington's 31st legislative district =

American legislative district

Coordinates: 47.176°N 121.792°W

Map of Washington's 31st legislative district

Washington's 31st legislative district is one of forty-nine districts in Washington for representation in the state legislature.

This district covers parts of southeastern King County, and parts of Pierce County, including the cities of Enumclaw, Buckley, Bonney Lake, Auburn, Sumner, Edgewood, South Prairie, Wilkeson and Carbonado.

The district's legislators are state senator Phil Fortunato and state representatives Drew Stokesbary (position 1) and Eric Robertson (position 2), all Republicans.

== See also ==
- Washington Redistricting Commission
- Washington State Legislature
- Washington State Senate
- Washington House of Representatives
