= Washington's 1st legislative district =

American legislative district

Coordinates: 47°48′N 122°13′W

Washington 1st legislative district map

Washington's 1st legislative district is one of 49 districts in Washington state and is responsible for representation in the state legislature.

The district's legislators are state senator Derek Stanford and state representatives Davina Duerr (position 1) and Shelley Kloba (position 2), all Democrats.

Patty Murray, Washington's current senior U.S. Senator and the fourth-highest-ranking Democrat and highest-ranking woman in the Senate, previously represented the 1st legislative district in the Washington State Senate for the 1989–1993 term before being elected to the United States Senate. However, much of what was once her district is now included in the 32nd district, as she lived at the time in what is now Shoreline.

1st legislative district (2012-2021)

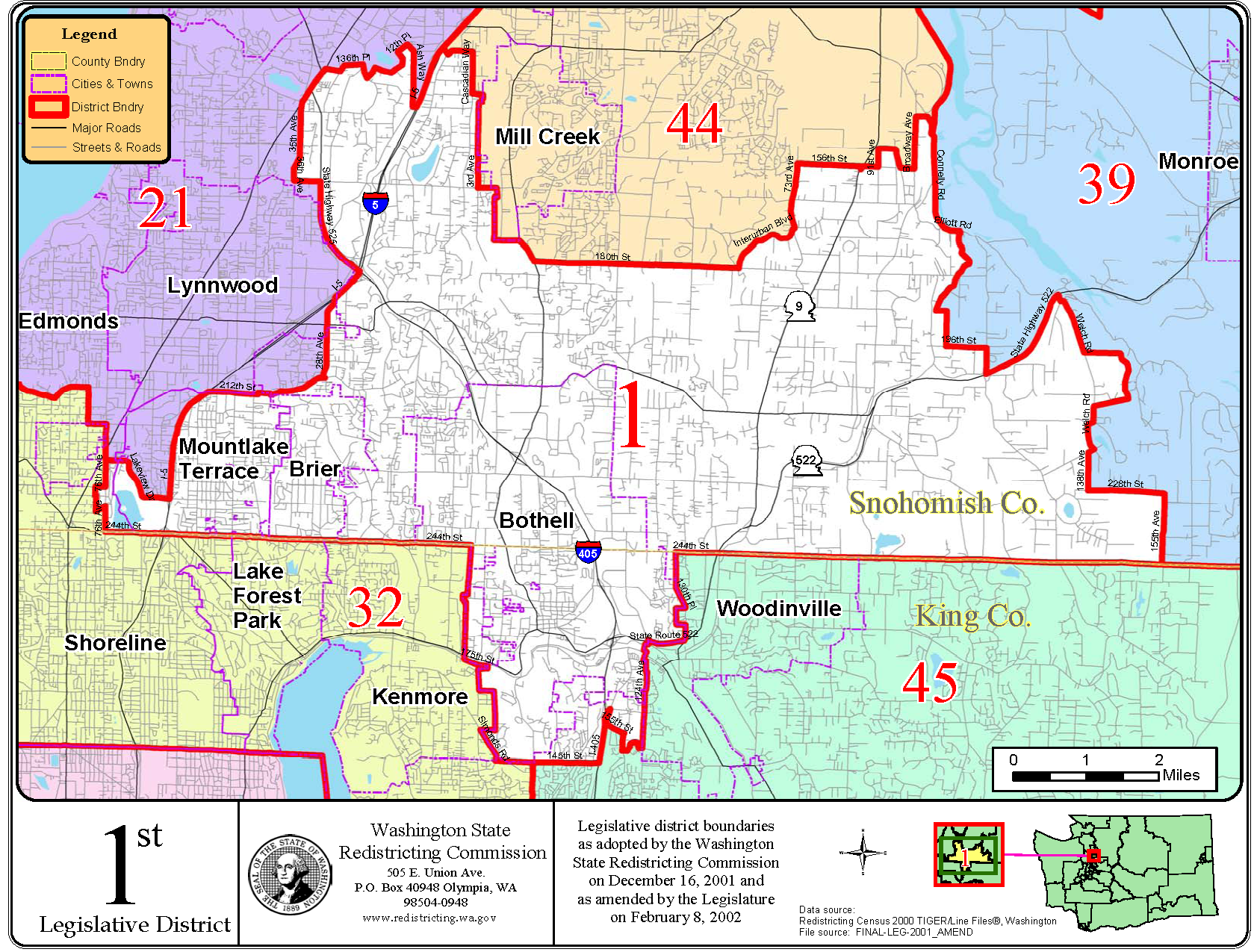
1st legislative district map, 2002–2012.

== 2012 redistricting ==
Following the 2010 United States census, the Washington Redistricting Commission was tasked with redrawing Washington's 49 legislative and 10 congressional districts. Before redistricting, Washington's 1st legislative district included a greater portion of unincorporated Snohomish County, particularly in the area west of Mill Creek, and none of the city of Kirkland was within its borders.

== Recent election results ==
=== State senator ===
2004 general election
Party	Candidate	Votes	%
Democratic	Rosemary McAuliffe	33,389	56.96
Republican	Jason Bontrager	25,229	43.04

2008 general election
Party	Candidate	Votes	%
Democratic	Rosemary McAuliffe	36,628	57.95
Republican	Dennis Richter	26,583	42.05

2012 general election
Party	Candidate	Votes	%
Democratic	Rosemary McAuliffe	37,316	55.49
Republican	Dawn McCravey	29,932	44.51

2016 general election
Party	Candidate	Votes	%
Democratic	Guy Palumbo	40,758	56.92
Republican	Mindie Wirth	30,850	43.08

2020 general election
Party	Candidate	Votes	%
Democratic	Derek Stanford	55,496	63.27
Republican	Art Coday	32,168	36.67

=== State Representative, position 1 ===
2002 general election
Party	Candidate	Votes	%
Democratic	Al O'Brien	17,501	49.92
Republican	Joshua Freed	16,485	47.02
Libertarian	Charlie Jackson	1,073	3.06

2004 general election
Party	Candidate	Votes	%
Democratic	Al O'Brien	31,238	53.72
Republican	Jeff Merrill	25,037	43.06
Libertarian	Terry Bartlett Buholm	1,872	3.22

2006 general election
Party	Candidate	Votes	%
Democratic	Al O'Brien	32,274	100

2008 general election
Party	Candidate	Votes	%
Democratic	Al O'Brien	48,791	100

2010 general election
Party	Candidate	Votes	%
Democratic	Derek Stanford	29,181	53.20
Republican	Dennis Richter	25,672	46.80

2012 general election
Party	Candidate	Votes	%
Democratic	Derek Stanford	37,824	57.85
Republican	Sandy Guinn	27,559	41.57

2014 general election
Party	Candidate	Votes	%
Democratic	Derek Stanford	25,276	58.43
Republican	Mark Davies	17,985	46.09

2016 general election
Party	Candidate	Votes	%
Democratic	Derek Stanford	43,207	60.97
Republican	Neil Thannisch	27,661	39.03

2018 general election
Party	Candidate	Votes	%
Democratic	Derek Stanford	47,881	69.59
Republican	Josh Colver	20,925	30.41

2020 general election
Party	Candidate	Votes	%
Democratic	Davina Duerr	58,019	66.43
Republican	Adam Bartholomew	29,256	33.5

=== State Representative, position 2 ===
2002 general election
Party	Candidate	Votes	%
Democratic	Jeanne Edwards	17,626	50.40
Republican	Leo Van Hollebeke	17,346	49.60

2004 general election
Party	Candidate	Votes	%
Democratic	Mark Ericks	29,767	51.25
Republican	Joshua Freed	28,313	48.75

2006 general election
Party	Candidate	Votes	%
Democratic	Mark Ericks	25,739	61.90
Republican	Mark Davies	15,843	38.10

2008 general election
Party	Candidate	Votes	%
Democratic	Mark Ericks	47,846	100

2010 general election
Party	Candidate	Votes	%
Democratic	Luis Moscoso	27,736	50.95
Republican	Heidi Munson	26,704	49.05

2012 general election
Party	Candidate	Votes	%
Democratic	Luis Moscoso	38,346	61.14
Independent	Mark T. Davies	24,373	38.86

2014 general election
Party	Candidate	Votes	%
Democratic	Luis Moscoso	23,198	53.91
Republican	Edward J. Barton	19,834	46.09

2016 general election
Party	Candidate	Votes	%
Democratic	Shelley Kloba	39,076	55.18
Republican	Jim Langston	31,739	44.82

2018 general election
Party	Candidate	Votes	%
Democratic	Shelley Kloba	43,560	63.4
Republican	Debra Blodgett	25,148	36.6

2020 general election
Party	Candidate	Votes	%
Democratic	Shelley Kloba	55,622	63.65
Republican	Jeb Brewer	31,696	36.27

== Past legislators ==
=== Statehood-1932 ===
During this period, the state senate and state house districts were geographically distinct.

Year	Senate		House		
Year	Senator	Senate District Geography	House Position 1	House Position 2	House District Geography
1st (1889-1890)	H. E. Houghton (R)	Spokane and Stevens Counties			
2nd (1891-1892)	F. H. Luce (R)	Lincoln and Okanogan Counties	House District Established		Stevens County (Note: Stevens County included Pend Oreille County until Pend Orielle was created in 1911.)
2nd (1891-1892)	F. H. Luce (R)	Lincoln and Okanogan Counties	John; Metcalf (P.P.)		Stevens County
3rd (1893-1894)	Richard A. Hutchinson (D)	Lincoln and Okanogan Counties	Samuel; Denn (P.P.)		Stevens County
4th (1895-1896)	Richard A. Hutchinson (D)	Lincoln and Okanogan Counties	Forrest Phelps (P.P.), (Pop.) (Note: Switched to the Populist Party for the 1894 election.)		Stevens County
5th (1897-1898)	F. M. Baum (D)	Lincoln and Okanogan Counties	Forrest Phelps (P.P.), (Pop.)		Stevens County
6th (1899-1900)	F. M. Baum (D)	Lincoln, Okanogan, and Chelan Counties	George M. Welty (Cit.)		Stevens County
7th (1901-1902)	Gotlieb Garber (D)	Lincoln, Okanogan, and Chelan Counties	Alex A. Anderson (D)		Stevens County
8th (1903-1904)	George J. Hurley (R)	Douglas, Ferry, and Okanogan Counties	Martin J. Maloney (D)	Position Established	Stevens County
8th (1903-1904)	George J. Hurley (R)	Douglas, Ferry, and Okanogan Counties	Martin J. Maloney (D)	Jerry; Cooney (D)	Stevens County
9th (1905-1906)	J. I. Pogue (R)	Douglas, Ferry, and Okanogan Counties	J. A. Kellogg (R)	Martin J. Maloney (D)	Stevens County
10th (1907-1908)	J. I. Pogue (R)	Douglas, Ferry, and Okanogan Counties	R. D. McRae (R)	A. W. McMorran (R)	Stevens County
11th (1909-1910)	Evan C. Davis (R)	Douglas, Ferry, and Okanogan Counties	R. A. Thayer (R)	Henry R. Spedden (R)	Stevens County
12th (1911-1912)	Evan C. Davis (R)	Douglas, Ferry, Grant, and Okanogan Counties	Henry R. Spedden (R)	S. J. Appleman (R)	Stevens County
13th (1913-1914)	Arthur McGuire (D)	Douglas, Ferry, Grant, and Okanogan Counties	Walter D. Smith (D)	J. C. Hutchinson (D)	Stevens County
14th (1915-1916)	Arthur McGuire (D)	Douglas, Ferry, Grant, and Okanogan Counties	John Olson (R)	J. F. Jarvis (D)	Stevens County
15th (1917-1918)	Jesse W. Faulkner (D)	Douglas, Ferry, Grant, and Okanogan Counties	Z. E. Hayden (R)	John Selmer (D)	Stevens County
16th (1919-1920)	Jesse W. Faulkner (D)	Douglas, Ferry, Grant, and Okanogan Counties	Albert I. Kulzer (D)	Al Weatherman (D)	Stevens County
17th (1921-1922)	H. D. McMillen (R)	Douglas, Ferry, Grant, and Okanogan Counties	J. M. Glasgow (R)	John T. Raftis (R)	Stevens County
18th (1923-1924)	H. D. McMillen (R)	Douglas, Ferry, Grant, and Okanogan Counties	J. M. Glasgow (R)	Herman F. Josefsky (R)	Stevens County
19th (1925-1926)	Horace E. Smith (R)	Douglas, Ferry, Grant, and Okanogan Counties	J. M. Glasgow (R)	Herman F. Josefsky (R)	Stevens County
20th (1927-1928)	Horace E. Smith (R)	Douglas, Ferry, Grant, and Okanogan Counties	Herman F. Josefsky (R)	George L. Denman (R)	Stevens County
21st (1929-1930)	Horace E. Smith (R)	Douglas, Ferry, Grant, and Okanogan Counties	George L. Denman (R)	J. M. Glasgow (R)	Stevens County
22nd (1931-1932)	Horace E. Smith (R)	Douglas, Ferry, Grant, and Okanogan Counties	George L. Denman (R)	S. W. Wurzburg (R)	Stevens County

=== 1933-Present ===
After the passage of Initiative 57 and the 1930 redistricting cycle, the state senate and state house districts were geographically similar. While some senate districts would occasionally be broken up into house seats A and B, seats A and B were always contained in the Senate district boundaries.

The 1st Legislative district's state senate and house seats are identical geographically from 1933 to the present day.

Year	Senate	House		District Geography
Year	Senator	House Position 1	House Position 2	District Geography
23rd (1933-1934)	Horace E. Smith (R)	E. F. Banker (D) (Note: Resigned May 17, 1933)	John R. Jones (D)	Douglas and Okanogan Counties
23rd (1933-1934)	Horace E. Smith (R)	B. L. Smith (D) (Note: Appointed 1933 to serve remaining term)	John R. Jones (D)	Douglas and Okanogan Counties
24th (1935-1936)	Horace E. Smith (R)	John R. Jones (D)	B. L. Smith (D)	Douglas and Okanogan Counties
25th (1937-1938)	J. M. Koontz (D)	Robert M. French (R)	John R. Jones (D)	Douglas and Okanogan Counties
26th (1939-1940)	J. M. Koontz (D)	Robert M. French (R)	John R. Jones (D)	Douglas and Okanogan Counties
27th (1941-1942)	Don T. Miller (D)	Robert M. French (R)	John R. Jones (D)	Douglas and Okanogan Counties
28th (1943-1944)	Don T. Miller (D)	Robert M. French (R)	Frank B. Malloy (R)	Douglas and Okanogan Counties
29th (1945-1946)	Don T. Miller (D)	Robert M. French (R)	Frank B. Malloy (R)	Douglas and Okanogan Counties
30th (1947-1948)	Don T. Miller (D)	Robert M. French (R)	Frank B. Malloy (R)	Douglas and Okanogan Counties
31st (1949-1950)	Robert M. French (R) (Note: Resigned before the 1955 session)	Wilbur G. Hallauer (D)	John R. Jones (D)	Douglas and Okanogan Counties
32nd (1951-1952)	Robert M. French (R)	Wilbur G. Hallauer (D)	John R. Jones (D)	Douglas and Okanogan Counties
33rd (1953-1954)	Robert M. French (R)	Wilbur G. Hallauer (D)	John R. Jones (D)	Douglas and Okanogan Counties
34th (1955-1956)	George D. Zahn (R) (Note: Appointed Jan 10, 1955 to serve unexpired term)	Horace W. Bozarth (D)	Wilbur G. Hallauer (D)	Douglas and Okanogan Counties
35th (1957-1958)	Wilbur G. Hallauer (D)	Horace W. Bozarth (D)	John Goldmark (D)	Douglas and Okanogan Counties
36th (1959-1960)	Wilbur G. Hallauer (D)	Horace W. Bozarth (D)	John Goldmark (D)	Douglas and Okanogan Counties
37th (1961-1962)	Wilbur G. Hallauer (D)	Horace W. Bozarth (D)	John Goldmark (D)	Douglas and Okanogan Counties
38th (1963-1964)	Wilbur G. Hallauer (D)	Horace W. Bozarth (D)	Joe Haussler (D)	Douglas and Okanogan Counties
39th (1965-1966)	Wilbur G. Hallauer (D)	Horace W. Bozarth (D)	Joe Haussler (D)	Douglas and Okanogan Counties
40th (1967-1968)	Wilbur G. Hallauer (D)	Alan Bluechel (R)	Francis E. Holman (R)	1965 Redistricting
40th (1967-1968)	Wilbur G. Hallauer (D)	Alan Bluechel (R)	Francis E. Holman (R)	King County (part)
41st (1969-1970)	Francis E. Holman (R)	Alan Bluechel (R)	Arthur C. Brown (R)	King County (part)
42nd (1971-1972)	Francis E. Holman (R)	Alan Bluechel (R)	Arthur C. Brown (R)	King County (part)
43rd (1973-1974)	Ray Van Hollebeke (D)	Arthur C. Brown (R) (Note: Resigned on Jun 15, 1976. Appointed to Pollution Control Hearings Board)	Rick S. Bender (D)	1972 Redistricting
43rd (1973-1974)	Ray Van Hollebeke (D)	Arthur C. Brown (R)	Rick S. Bender (D)	King (part) and Snohomish (part)
44th (1975-1976)	Ray Van Hollebeke (D)	Arthur C. Brown (R)	Rick S. Bender (D)	King (part) and Snohomish (part)
44th (1975-1976)	Ray Van Hollebeke (D)	Vern Daeley (R) (Note: Appointed Aug 4, 1976)	Rick S. Bender (D)	King (part) and Snohomish (part)
44th (1975-1976)	Ray Van Hollebeke (D)	Audrey Gruger (D) (Note: Elected Nov 2, 1976. Sworn in Dec 3, 1976 to serve unexpired term) (Note: Resigned Jan 10, 1982. Elected to King County Council district 1)	Rick S. Bender (D)	King (part) and Snohomish (part)
45th (1977-1978)	Ray Van Hollebeke (D)	Audrey Gruger (D)	Rick S. Bender (D)	King (part) and Snohomish (part)
46th (1979-1980)	Ray Van Hollebeke (D)	Audrey Gruger (D)	Rick S. Bender (D)	King (part) and Snohomish (part)
47th (1981-1982)	Bill Kiskaddon (R)	Audrey Gruger (D)	Rick S. Bender (D)	King (part) and Snohomish (part)
47th (1981-1982)	Bill Kiskaddon (R)	Grace E. Cole (D) (Note: Appointed Jan 11, 1982 to serve unexpired term.)	Rick S. Bender (D)	King (part) and Snohomish (part)
48th (1983-1984)	Bill Kiskaddon (R)	Nancy Rust (D)	Donn Charnley (D)	King (part) and Snohomish (part)
49th (1985-1986)	Bill Kiskaddon (R)	Nancy Rust (D)	Grace E. Cole (D)	King (part) and Snohomish (part)
50th (1987-1988)	Bill Kiskaddon (R)	Nancy Rust (D)	Grace E. Cole (D)	King (part) and Snohomish (part)
51st (1989-1990)	Patty Murray (D)	Nancy Rust (D)	Grace E. Cole (D)	King (part) and Snohomish (part)
52nd (1991-1992)	Patty Murray (D)	Nancy Rust (D)	Grace E. Cole (D)	King (part) and Snohomish (part)
53rd (1993-1994)	Rosemary McAuliffe (D)	Barbara Cothern (D)	Linda S. Johnson (D)	King (part) and Snohomish (part)
54th (1995-1996)	Rosemary McAuliffe (D)	Ian Elliot (R)	Mike Sherstad (R)	King (part) and Snohomish (part)
55th (1997-1998)	Rosemary McAuliffe (D)	Al O'Brien (D)	Mike Sherstad (R)	King (part) and Snohomish (part)
56th (1999-2000)	Rosemary McAuliffe (D)	Al O'Brien (D)	Jeanne Edwards (D)	King (part) and Snohomish (part)
57th (2001-2002)	Rosemary McAuliffe (D)	Al O'Brien (D)	Jeanne Edwards (D)	King (part) and Snohomish (part)
58th (2003-2004)	Rosemary McAuliffe (D)	Al O'Brien (D)	Jeanne Edwards (D)	King (part) and Snohomish (part)
59th (2005-2006)	Rosemary McAuliffe (D)	Al O'Brien (D)	Mark Ericks (D) (Note: Resigned Sept. 7th, 2010. Appointed U.S. Marshal for the Western District of Washington)	King (part) and Snohomish (part)
60th (2007-2008)	Rosemary McAuliffe (D)	Al O'Brien (D)	Mark Ericks (D)	King (part) and Snohomish (part)
61st (2009-2010)	Rosemary McAuliffe (D)	Al O'Brien (D)	Mark Ericks (D)	King (part) and Snohomish (part)
61st (2009-2010)	Rosemary McAuliffe (D)	Al O'Brien (D)	Luis Moscoso (D) (Note: Elected Nov 2, 2010. Sworn in Dec 3, 2010 to serve unexpired term)	King (part) and Snohomish (part)
62nd (2011-2012)	Rosemary McAuliffe (D)	Derek Stanford (D) (Note: Resigned July 1, 2019. Appointed to vacant state senate seat)	Luis Moscoso (D)	King (part) and Snohomish (part)
63rd (2013-2014)	Rosemary McAuliffe (D)	Derek Stanford (D)	Luis Moscoso (D)	King (part) and Snohomish (part)
64th (2015-2016)	Rosemary McAuliffe (D)	Derek Stanford (D)	Luis Moscoso (D)	King (part) and Snohomish (part)
65th (2017-2018)	Guy Palumbo (D) (Note: Resigned May 24, 2019)	Derek Stanford (D)	Shelley Kloba (D)	King (part) and Snohomish (part)
66th (2019-2020)	Guy Palumbo (D)	Derek Stanford (D)	Shelley Kloba (D)	King (part) and Snohomish (part)
66th (2019-2020)	Derek Stanford (D) (Note: Appointed July 1, 2019)	Davina Duerr (D) (Note: Appointed July 1, 2019)	Shelley Kloba (D)	King (part) and Snohomish (part)
67th (2021-2022)	Derek Stanford (D)	Davina Duerr (D)	Shelley Kloba (D)	King (part) and Snohomish (part)
68th (2023-2024)	Derek Stanford (D)	Davina Duerr (D)	Shelley Kloba (D)	King (part) and Snohomish (part)
69th (2025-2026)	Derek Stanford (D)	Davina Duerr (D)	Shelley Kloba (D)	King (part) and Snohomish (part)

== Key ==
Democratic (D)
Populist (Pop)
Republican (R)

- P.P. is People's Party which was closely associate with the Populist Party.
- Cit. is Citizen's Party which was a minor party.

== See also ==
- Washington Redistricting Commission
- Washington State Legislature
- Washington State Senate
- Washington House of Representatives
- Washington (state) legislative districts
