= Nancy Rust =

American politician (1928–2018)

Nancy S. Rust

Member of the Washington House of Representatives from the 44th Pos.1 district
- In office January 12th 1981 – January 10, 1983
- Preceded by: Donn Charnley
- Succeeded by: Jeanine H. Long

Member of the Washington House of Representatives from the 1st Pos.1 district
- In office January 10, 1983 – January 11, 1993 Serving with Donn Charnley (1983-84); Grace E. Cole (1985-92)
- Preceded by: Audrey Gruger
- Succeeded by: Barbara S. Cothern

Member of the Washington House of Representatives from the 32nd Pos.1 district
- In office January 11, 1993 – January 13, 1997
- Preceded by: Joanne J. Brekke
- Succeeded by: Patty Butler

Personal details
- Born: September 15, 1928 Iowa City, Iowa, U.S.
- Died: June 16, 2018 (aged 89) Seattle, Washington, U.S.
- Party: Democratic

Nancy Shuttleworth Rust (September 15, 1928 – June 16, 2018) was an American politician in the state of Washington. She served in the Washington House of Representatives for the 44th, 1st, and 32nd districts from 1981 to 1997.
