= John Goldmark =

American politician (1917–1979)

Member of the Washington House of Representatives from the 1st district
- In office January 14, 1957 – January 14, 1963 Serving with Horace W. Bozarth
- Preceded by: Wilbur G. Hallauer
- Succeeded by: Joe Haussler

Personal details
- Born: October 7, 1917 Scarsdale, New York, U.S.
- Died: October 31, 1979 (aged 62) Seattle, Washington, U.S.
- Party: Democratic
- Children: Peter J. Goldmark
- Education: Haverford College; Harvard Law School

John E. Goldmark (October 7, 1917 – October 31, 1979) was an American politician in the state of Washington. He served as a Democrat in the Washington House of Representatives between 1956 and 1962, during which time he was chair of the Ways and Means Committee.

In 1962, he brought a libel case against former legislator Albert F. Canwell and a number of other parties for a series of editorials written about him and his wife in local papers, alleging that they were sympathetic to the Communist Party. He won the case and was awarded $40,000 in damages, but the award was overturned following the Supreme Court's decision in New York Times Co. v. Sullivan.

== Early life ==
Goldmark was born on October 7, 1917, in Scarsdale, New York. He was the only child of Charles J. Goldmark, an electrical engineer of Austrian Jewish descent, and Ruth Ingersoll, an academic in English literature. His uncle was Louis Brandeis, a Supreme Court justice, and his mother was a descendant of the 18th-century preacher Jonathan Edwards. His mother died shortly after his birth and Goldmark grew up outside of New York City, attending a number of Quaker boarding schools. He graduated from Haverford College, where he was first in his class, and from Harvard Law School in 1941, where he was a member of the law review.

== Early career ==
Goldmark intended to work in public service but when World War II began, he applied for a commission with the U.S. Navy and, in the interim, moved to Washington, D.C., to work at the Office of Price Administration in 1941. While working there, he met his future wife Irma "Sally" Ringe, who was working on the New Deal, and the couple fell in love. At the time of their courtship she had been a member of the American Communist Party since 1935, paying dues and attending study groups, but Goldmark was averse to the organization and she later stated that she resigned her membership in 1943, the year after they married. He was called up by the Navy during the summer of 1942 as an apprentice seaman, and went through officer training before being commissioned at the rank of ensign in December. While back in D.C. for bomb disposal training, he married Ringe and the couple had their first child, Charles, in January 1944. A few days later, Goldmark was deployed to Oceania where he worked in bomb disarmament in New Guinea and Australia. He was seconded to the Army to work in bomb and missile disarmament during the campaign to re-capture the Philippines.

Following his discharge after the war in 1945, Goldmark and his family moved west, where he believed people were "less twisted up in tradition, class and inhibitions." They relocated first to White Salmon, Washington, where he worked for an orchardist and where, in 1946, their second child Peter was born. In the spring of the following year, the family moved to Okanogan County, where Goldmark bought a 500-acre (200 ha) wheat and cattle ranch on the Colville Indian Reservation, 250 miles (400 km) northeast of Seattle. The family briefly encountered issues with Ringe's past – she was questioned in 1949 by two Federal Bureau of Investigation (FBI) agents about her experiences in the Communist Party and in 1956, she was subpoenaed to testify at a Seattle hearing of the United States House Un-American Activities Committee (HUAC) – but they believed those concerns were behind them. Goldmark had joined the Navy reserves as a commander and he received top security clearance, even after an interview in which he mentioned his wife's past. He became involved in community organizations in Okanogan, including the Grange and the Wheat Grower's Association. He served on the Rural Electrification Board in the 1950s, where he pushed for public hydropower using the recently constructed Grand Coulee Dam, as electricity was controlled by the Washington Water Power Company, which charged higher prices than most farmers could afford. Supporters of the dam were nicknamed "Coulee Communists" at the time.

== Political career ==
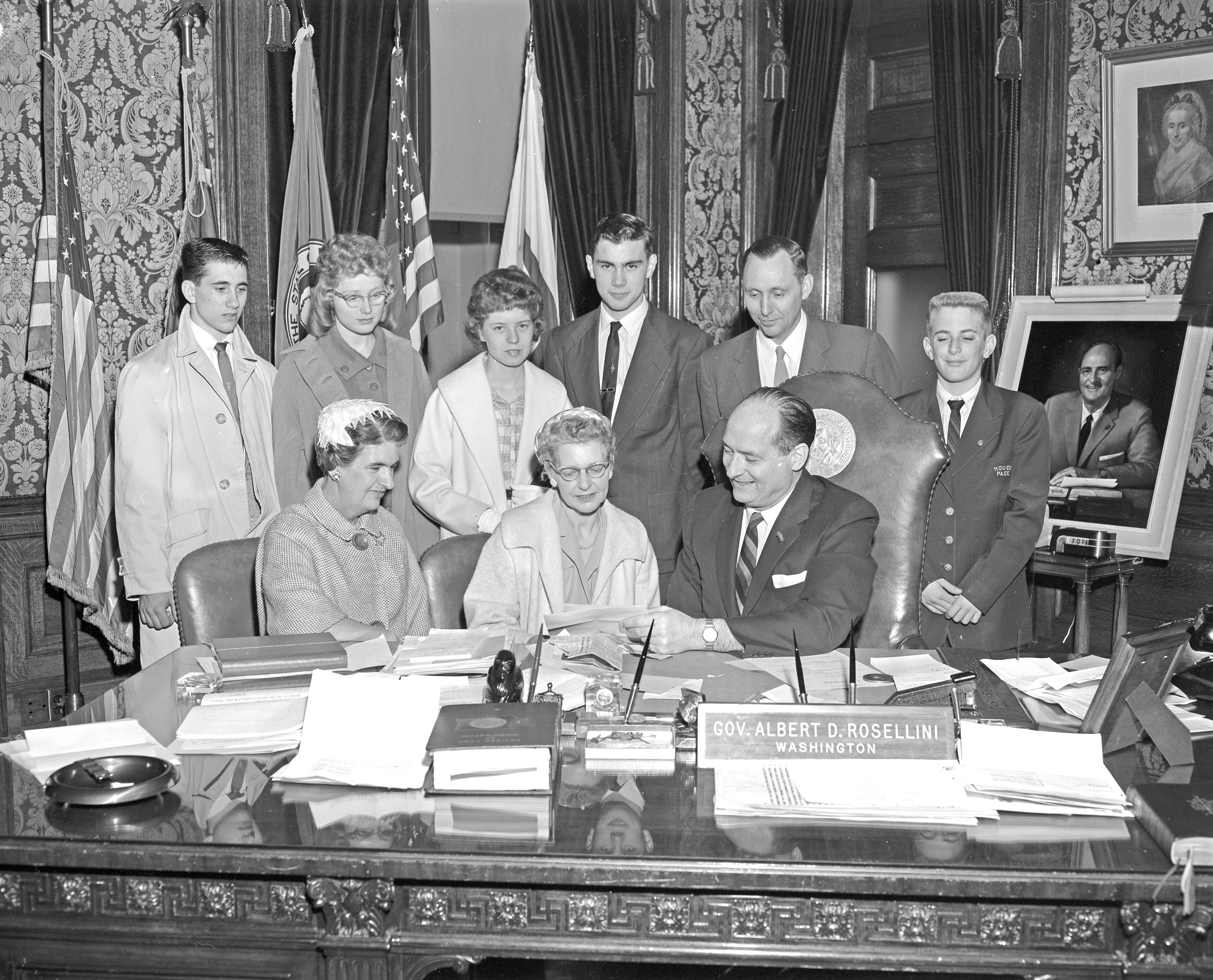
Goldmark with Governor Albert Rosellini and others in 1961

Goldmark was also active in Democratic politics; he started a local branch of the Young Democrats, was elected president of the state organization by 1951 and the following year was a delegate for Adlai Stevenson at the 1952 Democratic National Convention. In the 1956 election, he successfully ran for a seat in the Washington House of Representatives. He was a representative of the 1st district, a rural Democratic district which comprised two representatives and a state senator from Douglas and Okanogan counties, replacing Wilbur G. Hallauer who had run for the Washington State Senate.

Goldmark had earned a pilot's license in 1949 and was known initially for flying his plane to the state capital in Olympia. He served a total of six years in the legislature, where he was actively involved with budget and tax issues and argued in favor of public electrical power. He was known as a liberal Democrat, who supported road improvements, public parks and public libraries. He supported the American Civil Liberties Union (ACLU), sponsoring a bill they drafted to protect due process and the right to free speech in trade unions in 1959, and became a member of their state committee. He also encouraged the creation of a state art commission.

Goldmark was re-elected three times to the legislature, in 1956, 1958 and 1960, by a margin of three-to-two. He ran to be speaker of the house in 1960 but withdrew to support John L. O'Brien, who appointed him as a floor lieutenant. The same year, he was a keynote speaker at a campaign meeting in Seattle for John F. Kennedy during his presidential campaign and was a delegate at the 1960 Democratic National Convention, again voting for Stevenson. He was chair of the House ways and means committee, becoming the most powerful House Democrat besides the speaker, and the legislative budget committee in 1961.

== Accusation of communism ==
Prior to the 1962 election, the anti-communism movement had begun to grow locally, with the formation of the Okanogan County Anti-Communism League in 1961, led by Loris Gillespie, a businessman and former county Republican chair, and Don Caron, state coordinator of the John Birch Society who had become a cause célèbre for quitting his job with the U.S. Forest Service when they asked him to stop running his anti-communist column in the Okanogan Independent. Study groups began to appear across the county to listen to tapes by Fred Schwarz and Ronald Reagan and discuss the threat of communism. A local pastor who preached against false claims of communism was moved out of the county and local residents began to protest the proposed affiliation of the local library with the North Central Regional Library and films such as Inherit the Wind and Exodus, fearing these were all signs of communism.

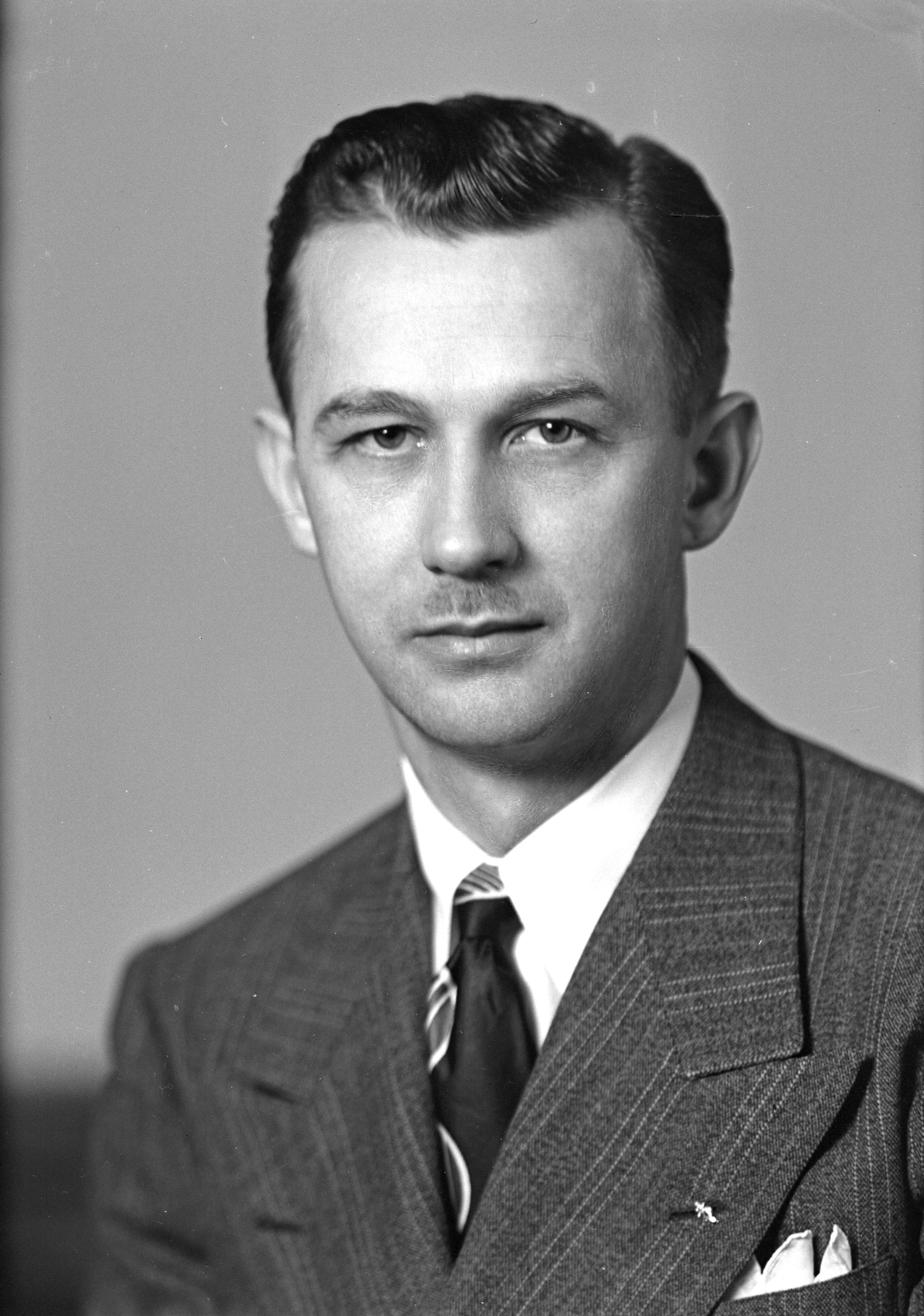
Albert F. Canwell in 1947

During Goldmark's last term in office, articles began to appear about him in local papers. There had been previous rumors that he was a communist during his re-election campaigns but he had always been successful in the elections. After the 1961 legislative session, he returned to his ranch where he began to hear new rumors that he and his wife were affiliated with the Communist Party. The renewed efforts were spearheaded by Ashley Holden, a former editor for The Spokesman-Review and fervent opponent of public power, and Albert F. Canwell, a former Republican legislator and head of the state Un-American Activities Committee. After leaving office, Canwell established the "American Intelligence Service", through which he maintained files on local figures he suspected of communism and published this information in his newsletter The Vigilante. He had been told in 1956 by an employee of HUAC that Ringe was a former member of the Communist Party. In January 1962, along with Holden, he published an article in his newsletter about a state legislator married to "Irma Mae Ringe", identified as a former communist who had studied with Victor Perlo, which alleged that her husband supported the Communist regime in China. Goldmark was not named, although some local people were aware of his wife's maiden name.

When the primary campaign kicked-off in July, articles began to appear which named Goldmark, claiming that he intended to repeal the McCarran Act, that his wife had known Alger Hiss and that he would not salute the American flag. Canwell distributed an interview where he claimed that Ringe had been in the Communist Party until at least 1948 and that Goldmark was affiliated with the ACLU, which he claimed was a communist front. On August 23, 1962, Canwell held a rally at the local American Legion hall, which was attended by 150 people. He and Gillespie, the "anti-subversive chairman" of the organization, held what they described as a non-political meeting. Canwell repeated his allegations that the ACLU was a communist organization and implied that Ringe was being blackmailed by the Communist Party into drafting liberal bills. During the event, state senator Hallauer went on stage, claiming the meeting was a personal attack on him and Goldmark. He was removed from the stage as, he later claimed, the crowd cheered for him to be thrown out. The event was summarised by Holden in the Tonasket Tribune, where he also wrote an editorial claiming that Goldmark was "a tool of a monstrous conspiracy" and "the idol of the Pinkos and ultra-liberals who infest every session of the legislature".

Goldmark lost by a three to one margin in the September primary, coming fourth out of five challengers, and Democrats Horace W. Bozarth and Joe Haussler were ultimately elected in the 1962 general election for the 1st district. In 1960, he had received 4,395 votes in the primary but in 1962, he received 2,567 votes compared to the 6,521 and 5,568 votes received by his successful opponents. Following his loss, Canwell described his talk at the Legion Hall as "the bullet that got Goldmark" in his newsletter.

== Libel case ==
Furious, Goldmark and his wife filed suit for $225,000 against the Tonasket Tribune, Holden, Canwell, Gillespie and Caron. The couple claimed they were the victims of libel, as the defendants had falsely claimed that they were members of, or sympathetic to, the Communist Party. The John Birch Society was initially listed as a defendant on charges of conspiracy, but these were dismissed prior to the hearing in September 1963. Judge Theodore S. Turner presided over the trial, which was held locally, beginning on November 4, 1963. The defendants and their attorney, E. Glenn Harmon, claimed that Goldmark and his wife were still communists. Holden contended that the lawsuit was an "effort to scare the living daylights out of conservatives everywhere in the nation". Goldmark and his attorney, William L. Dwyer, both argued that he had never been a member or a supporter of the Communist Party. Three weeks into the trial, President John F. Kennedy was assassinated, prompting concerns by the claimants that the verdict could be affected by rumors that his killer was a Marxist.

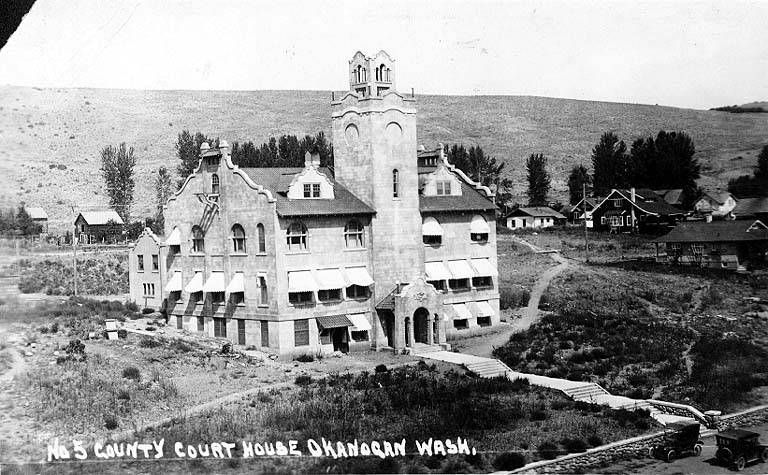
The Okanogan County courthouse circa 1923

A number of prominent witnesses testified for both sides, with the defendants bringing various anti-communists experts to speak about the scale of the communist conspiracy, including congressman Donald Jackson and former communists John Lautner and Karl Prussion. The defendants claimed that Goldmark and his wife were in a communist forced marriage and that Ringe listening to folk music was evidence that she was still sympathetic to the communist agenda. The accusations extended to their son, Charles, who attended Reed College which had recently hosted a talk by Gus Hall, a Communist Party secretary. Herbert Philbrick, a former spy for the FBI, testified that the ACLU was a communist front. The claimants called witnesses who included actor Sterling Hayden, writer Paul Jacobs, senator Harry P. Cain, state representative Slade Gorton and their elder son.

The trial lasted 43 days and ended with the defendants' attorneys arguing in their closing statement that there was not a conspiracy to defame Goldmark and they had simply been campaigning against an elected official. In his closing statement, defense attorney Joseph Wicks compared communism to an infection, similar to a dog with rabies, and asked how a communist could believe in God, causing the religious Ringe to leave the courtroom in tears. Dwyer argued on behalf of the claimants that the issue was one of fairness and that the defendants went too far in harming Goldmark's reputation.

=== Ruling ===
The jury deliberated for five days, before finding in Goldmark's favor on five of his nine claims on January 22, 1964. They awarded him damages of $40,000, one of the largest amounts awarded in the state for a libel trial. Ringe was not awarded anything in damages. Each of the defendants was found guilty, with the most damages awarded against Holden for his editorial, although the jury did not rule that there had been a conspiracy. The verdict made national headlines, receiving favorable coverage in newspapers including The Portland Oregonian, The Washington Post and Time magazine. Timothy Egan wrote that the trial "had done to the Red Scare what the Scopes monkey trial had (at least temporarily) done to Creationism".

The defendants appealed and on December 18, 1964, Turner overturned the judgment due to a ruling by the United States Supreme Court in March 1964. The court had held in the case of New York Times Co. v. Sullivan on March 9, 1964, that public officials could not claim damages for comments about any actions in relation to their official duties unless there was proof of malice. Turner said that while the case proved that the defendants had falsely claimed that Goldmark was a communist, it had not been proven that this was done maliciously. The defendants considered this a victory, with Canwell describing Ringe as a lesbian communist, but Goldmark chose not to appeal the decision and request a new trial as his concern was proving the charges were false, which had been accomplished.

== Later life and legacy ==
Goldmark retired from public life; the family initially returned to the ranch but in 1966, he was unseated by a horse and nearly died from hypothermia before he was found. He broke his hip, forcing him to relearn how to walk. He and Ringe moved to Madrona, Seattle, where he became a trial attorney. Ringe worked to turn a former fire station into a local branch of the Seattle Public Library and it was named the Madrona-Sally Goldmark Branch in her honor. Goldmark was diagnosed with lymph cancer in 1973 and died on October 31, 1979. A documentary television show titled Suspect about his case aired on KING-TV.

Goldmark's wife Irma died in 1985, the same year that, on December 24, a stranger named David L. Rice broke into the house of their son Charles, chloroformed him, his wife Annie and their two sons and murdered them. Rice believed that he was fighting a war against communism and he had heard through a meeting of the local chapter of the Duck Club, an anti-Semitic and anti-communist organization, that the Goldmarks were communists. Rice's lawyers would claim at trial that he had confused Charles for his father, whom the founder of the Seattle chapter of the Duck Club, Homer Brand, had described as the regional director of the Communist Party. Goldmark's second son Peter J. Goldmark was elected as the Washington State Commissioner of Public Lands in 2008.
