= Washington State Department of Corrections =

Law enforcement agency

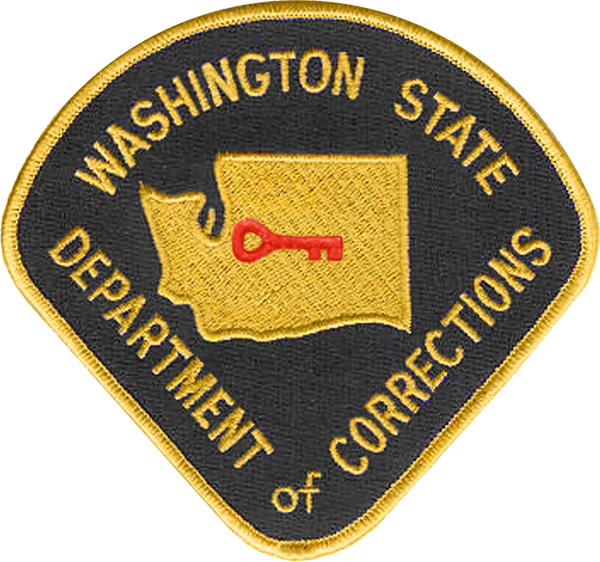

- Badge patch of the Washington State Department of Corrections
- Abbreviation: WADOC
- Motto: Working together for safe communities.

Agency overview
- Formed: July 1, 1981
- Preceding agency: Washington Department of Social and Health Services
- Employees: 11,385 (2019)
- Annual budget: $2.2 billion USD (2021)

Jurisdictional structure
- Operations jurisdiction: Washington, United States
- Map of Washington State Department of Corrections's jurisdiction
- Area: 71,300 square miles (185,000 km^{2})
- Population: 7.82 million (2025 est.)
- General nature: Civilian police

Operational structure
- Headquarters: Tumwater, Washington
- Peace Officers: Limited Authority
- Agency executive: Tim Lang, Secretary of Corrections

Facilities
- Work releases: 16
- Prisons: 12

Website
- Washington State Department of Corrections website

The Washington State Department of Corrections (WADOC) is a department of the government of the State of Washington. WADOC is responsible for administering adult corrections programs operated by the state. This includes state correctional institutions and programs for people supervised in the community. Its headquarters are in Tumwater, Washington.

== History ==
The modern Washington Department of Corrections is a relatively young state agency. Agency oversight of correctional institutions in Washington State went through several transitions during the 20th century before the WADOC's creation in 1981.

Prior to the 1970s, state correctional facilities were managed by the Washington Department of Institutions. governor Daniel J. Evans consolidated the Department of Institutions, Department of Public Assistance & Vocational Rehabilitation, and other related departments into the Washington State Department of Social and Health Services (DSHS) in the 1970s.

On July 1, 1981, the Washington State Legislature transferred the administration of adult correctional institutions from the Washington State Department of Social and Health Services, Division of Adult Corrections (DSHS) to the newly created Washington State Department of Corrections as part of the 1981 Corrections Reform Act.

== Organizational structure ==
The Washington Department of Corrections organizational structure includes six major divisions:

- Women’s Prisons
- Men’s Prisons
- Community Corrections
- Administrative Operations
- Health Services
- Reentry

Each division has an assistant secretary who oversees the division's operations.

The secretary of corrections is the executive head of the department. The secretary is appointed by the governor with the consent of the state Senate.

== Department facilities ==
=== Prisons ===
The department currently operates 11 adult prisons, of which 9 are male institutions and two are female institutions. The department confines over 12,000 people in these facilities, with each varying in size and mission across the state.

The Washington State Legislature in the 2025 legislative session passed a budget to close the Mission Creek Corrections Center for Women (MCCCW). Its closure is planned for September 2025, with all Incarcerated Individuals being moved to the Washington Corrections Center for Women (WCCW). With MCCCW's closure, the WCCW will be the only facility left in the Women's Prison Division.

=== Work releases ===
The department currently has 12 work release facilities. All but two of these facilities are operated by contractors, who manage the daily safety and security and have oversight of the facilities full-time (24 hours a day, 7 days per week). Department staff are located on site to assist in supervision, monitoring, and case management of those under supervision, as well as monitoring of the contracts.

Formerly incarcerated people housed in work release facilities have progressed from full confinement to partial confinement, and are required to seek, secure, and maintain employment in the community, as well as pay for their room and board. This model is designed to provide some foundation for employment and housing when the formerly incarcerated are released to communities.

=== Field offices ===
Community Supervision occurs at 86 varied locations in the community to include: field offices, community justice centers, Community Oriented Policing (COP) Shops and outstations. Activities of supervised people in the community are monitored, which includes home visits, by a Community Corrections Officer to ensure compliance with court, or known as the Indeterminate Sentence Review Board (ISRB), which was the Washington State Board of Prison Terms and Paroles, only those individuals who have been deemed rehabilitated by the ISRB are placed on Parole and department conditions of supervision, such as Community Supervision and/or Community Custody.

== Community Justice Centers ==
The Community Justice Centers are responsible for aiding offenders who are reentering the community by providing them with various resources and a designated place to go to receive additional opportunities to ensure their success once they reenter the community.

There are six Community Justice Centers in the state of Washington:

1. Everett Justice Center
2. Seattle Justice Center
3. Spokane Justice Center
4. Tacoma Justice Center
5. Vancouver Justice Center
6. Yakima Justice Center

All the justice centers are staffed by the department and are nonresidential facilities. The main resources provided by these centers include reentry planning, mental health services, sex offense treatment, anger management, parenting education, financial literacy, and housing and employee assistance. While this list does not include all the programs and resources provided by these centers, these are the major ones to note.

The centers also provide sanctions to individuals upon their reentry to aid them in accountability and ensure they are receiving the necessary help to ensure they are successful upon their reentry.

== Death row ==
In 2014, Governor Jay Inslee announced a moratorium on carrying out the death penalty in Washington State. According to Inslee, "Equal justice under the law is the state's primary responsibility. And in death penalty cases, I'm not convinced equal justice is being served. The use of the death penalty in this state is unequally applied, sometimes dependent on the budget of the county where the crime occurred." The moratorium means that if a death penalty case comes to the governor's desk for action, he will issue a reprieve. However, this action does not commute the sentences of those on death row or issue any pardons. The majority of Washington's death penalty sentences are overturned and those convicted of capital offenses are rarely executed, indicating questionable sentencing in many cases. Since 1981, the year Washington State's current capital laws were put in place, 32 defendants have been sentenced to die. Of those, 18 have had their sentences converted to life in prison and one was set free. This has raised issues in accountability, as there have been multiple inmates serving life sentences that have killed other inmates that have stated that there's nothing more they can do to them because they are already serving a life sentence.

Prior to Inslee's moratorium, Washington's capital punishment law required that capital punishment imposed by the state's courts be carried out at the Washington State Penitentiary in Walla Walla. Procedures for conducting executions are supervised by the Penitentiary Superintendent. Washington utilizes two methods of execution: lethal injection and hanging. Lethal injection is used unless the inmate under sentence of death chooses hanging as the preferred execution method.

Within 10 days of a trial court entering a judgment and sentence imposing the death penalty, male defendants under sentence of death are transferred to the Penitentiary, where they remain in a segregation unit [Intensive Management Unit North (IMU-N) at the prison] pending appeals, and until a death warrant is issued setting the date for the execution. Female defendants under sentence of death are housed at the Washington Corrections Center for Women near Gig Harbor before being transferred to the Penitentiary no later than 72 hours prior to a scheduled execution, also housed in IMU North, although the execution chamber is located in Unit 6.

78 persons have been executed in Washington since 1904, the most recent being Cal Coburn Brown, in 2010.

As of 2023, the death penalty was repealed in Washington State.

== Correctional Industries ==
The Washington Department of Corrections revenue-generating, industry job training, and factory food production branch is Washington State Correctional Industries. It is a member of the National Correctional Industries Association.

Correctional Industries began centralizing food production at the Airway Heights Correctional Center in 1995. In the years since, freshly cooked food for incarcerated people in Washington prisons has gradually and in large part been replaced by factory processed, prepackaged food.

== Private contracts ==
=== Private prisons ===
On May 21, 2015, The GEO Group announced the signing of a contract with the Washington Department of Corrections for the out-of-state housing of up to 1,000 prisoners at the company-owned North Lake Correctional Facility in Baldwin, Michigan, with a contract term of five years inclusive of renewal option periods.

=== Food vendors ===
Under the Washington state Food Umbrella Contract, WA DOC's Correctional Industries procures products from Food Services of America, Liberty Distributing, Medosweet Farms, Spokane Produce, Terry Dairy's, Triple "B" Corporations, and Unisource. WA DOC also contracts with Evergreen Vending, Coca-Cola, and other private food vendors for its facility vending machines.

=== Communications ===
WA DOC contracts with JPay, a private company that charges the incarcerated and their families for electronic mail, photo-sharing, money transfer, and video visiting services. Phone services for the incarcerated and their families are through WA DOC's contract with Global Tel Link.

== Secretary of Corrections ==
The secretary of corrections in Washington State is a cabinet level position appointed by the state governor. This position differs from the historical director of the Washington Department of Institutions in its educational requirements. In the 1950s and 1960s, Washington law mandated that directors of the Department of Institutions were required to hold graduate degrees. The modern Washington Department of Corrections has no such requirements for its secretary of corrections.

The position is responsible for administration of various adult correctional programs as well as overall management of the department. The position can also delegate tasks to various other departments and administrations including, Budget Strategy and Technology Administration, Chief Medical Officer, Communications Office, Employee and Business Support Services Administration, Equity, Diversity, Inclusion, & Respect (EDIR), Indeterminate Sentence Review Board (ISRB), and Office of Indian Policy.

The Office of Deputy Secretary (which is separate from the Office of the Secretary) also oversees some major operational areas including the Community Corrections Division, Health Services Division, Prisons Division and the Reentry Division.

=== Amos Reed ===
Amos Reed, appointed by Governor John Spellman, served as the first Washington state secretary of corrections from 1981 to 1986.

Prior to his position as secretary, Reed served as an administrator in the Oregon Department of Corrections from 1969 to 1975.

=== Chase Riveland ===
Chase Riveland was appointed Secretary of Corrections by Governor Booth Gardner in 1986. He retired in 1997. Riveland drew criticism from Republican lawmakers who felt he was not harsh enough on incarcerated people. However, his cautions against politically-driven policies have proven prescient in the mass incarceration decades that followed his time as secretary. By 2008, the number of people incarcerated in Washington had more than tripled since the time Riveland first came to WADOC.

=== Joseph D. Lehman ===
Joe Lehman was a graduate of St. Martin's College and Pacific Lutheran University. He spent 21 years as a probation and parole officer and deputy secretary in Washington's prison system. Lehman was appointed secretary of Corrections by Governor Gary Locke in 1997, and served until 2005. Prior to serving as WADOC secretary, Lehman oversaw Pennsylvania's largest prison expansion in state history and then worked for the Maine correctional system. In 1994, Lehman won the Association of State Correctional Administrators Francke Award. Lehman's starting salary as WADOC secretary was $93,659 He oversaw WADOC at a time when the department had a budget of $765 million, with 12,825 incarcerated people and 6,300 employees]

=== Harold Clarke ===
Harold Clarke, appointed by Governor Christine Gregoire, served as Secretary of Corrections from 2005 until his resignation in late 2007. Prior to his appointment, he directed the Nebraska Department of Corrections, where he had climbed through the ranks for over twenty years. He resigned as WADOC secretary amid controversy over probation supervision to take a position as commissioner of the Massachusetts Department of Corrections.

=== Eldon Vail ===
Eldon Vail returned from retirement after 31 years with WADOC to serve as Acting Secretary of Corrections until his formal appointment as Secretary by Governor Christine Gregoire in 2008. Vail resigned amid controversy over an affair with a subordinate in 2011.

=== Bernard Warner ===
Bernard Warner was appointed by Governor Christine Gregoire as Secretary of Corrections in 2011. Warner resigned in 2015 to take a position at a private Salt Lake City corrections industry.

=== Dan Pacholke ===
Governor Jay Inslee appointed Dan Pacholke Secretary of Corrections in 2015. Pacholke began his career in WADOC in 1982 as a correctional officer at McNeil Island Corrections Center. He worked his way through the ranks until he was appointed secretary. Pacholke resigned after a short tenure amid controversy over a WADOC computer glitch that caused the somewhat early release of approximately 3,000 incarcerated people over more than a decade. Some formerly incarcerated people who had established new lives upon early release were reincarcerated in response to public and political outcry over the early releases. The early release scandal became an expression of more complex political relationships in anticipation of the 2016 Washington State election season. In a resignation email to Senator Mike Padden—one of the most conservative members of the Washington State Senate's Law and Justice Committee—Pacholke wrote, "I notify you now of my resignation. I hope it helps meet your need for blood. I hope it gives you fodder for the press and fulfills your political needs so you can let this agency, our agency, heal." Former secretary of corrections Bernie Warner told the media he did not know about the computer glitch until notified by Governor Jay Inslee's general counsel. However, Pacholke told the media that Warner's assistant secretary knew of the mistaken early release of prisoners as early as 2012. At least two people were killed in homicides linked to prisoners who had mistakenly been released early, and families of the deceased in each of those cases went on to file wrongful death lawsuits against the agency. One of those lawsuits resulted in a $3.25 million settlement paid out by the DOC.

Since leaving WADOC, Pacholke has become the co-director at Segregation Solutions. He co-authored a report with Sandy Felkey Mullins on segregation practices for the U.S. Department of Justice Bureau of Justice Assistance titled "More Than Emptying Beds: A Systems Approach to Segregation Reform".

=== Richard Morgan ===
Richard "Dick" Morgan returned from retirement after more than three decades of employment with WA DOC to be appointed by Governor Jay Inslee as acting secretary, effective March 14, 2016. He served in the role of secretary until January 12, 2017. Morgan had previously served as a member of the Indeterminate Sentence Review Board and of the Washington Coalition to Abolish the Death Penalty.

=== Jody Becker-Green ===
Former Washington State Department of Social and Health Services employee Jody Becker-Green was appointed by Governor Jay Inslee as acting secretary from January 10, 2017 to April 25, 2017, becoming the first woman to serve in this role.

=== Stephen Sinclair ===
Stephen Sinclair was appointed WA DOC secretary by Governor Jay Inslee on April 25, 2017. He began his career at the agency as a correctional officer and gained progressively greater responsibilities as investigator, sergeant, associate superintendent, superintendent and assistant secretary.

As superintendent of the Washington State Penitentiary, Sinclair created the Sustainable Practices Lab. In addition to his role as secretary, he was the DOC co-director of the Sustainability in Prisons Project at The Evergreen State College.

=== Cheryl Strange ===
On April 29, 2021, Washington State Governor Jay Inslee appointed Cheryl Strange as the Washington DOC's first permanent female secretary. Prior to her appointment, Strange was Secretary of the Washington State Department of Social and Health Services. She had previously served as the CEO of Western State Hospital. After retiring from the DOC in January 2025, Strange spent a four month stint as Secretary of the Department of Social and Health Services at the request of Governor Bob Ferguson.

=== Tim Lang ===
On December 15, 2024, Governor-elect Bob Ferguson nominated Tim Lang to head WADOC after the retirement of Secretary Strange in January 2025. Previously, Tim Lang and Bob Fergusson worked together in the Washington State Attorney General's Office, With Bob Fergusson serving as Attorney General and Tim Lang leading the Corrections Division of the AGO. In his time as the head of the Corrections Division, Tim Lang was the lead counsel for WADOC during lawsuits and aided the department with legal inquiries. Tim Lang's appointment as WADOC Secretary was effective January 15, 2025.

== Staff ==
=== Paramilitary culture ===
WADOC is a paramilitary organization and values respect for chain of command and seniority. Custody ranks are modelled after military ranks. Officers are not given a rank, with Sergeants acting as the first line supervisors. Lieutenants are usually commanders of a shift, with them being regarded as more administrative than custody. Every level three custody facility has a Captain as the head of custody staff for the facility, with level two facilities having a Lieutenant as the head of custody staff. Some facilities, such as the Monroe Correctional Complex (MCC) has multiple Captains for the different units due to the size of the facility.

=== Labor union ===
Non-management positions in the Washington Department of Corrections are negotiated by the Teamsters Local 117 labor union. and the Washington Federation of State Employees.

=== Honor guard ===
WADOC Honor Guard protocols are governed by WADOC Policy 870.440. Individual WADOC correctional facilities are not required to maintain an Honor Guard. As of 2013, only five of WADOC's 11 facilities maintained an active Honor Guard. Facility superintendents and Chiefs of Emergency Operation are responsible for selecting Honor Guard members and approving Honor Guard participation in local events.

=== Line of duty deaths ===
The most well-known line of duty death in recent WADOC history was that of Jayme Biendl in 2011. This incident has been called "the Washington Department of Corrections 9/11", as it resulted in dramatic changes to WADOC security protocols and programs for incarcerated people. An annual Behind the Badge memorial run is held in honor of Biendl's service.

== Ombudsman ==
In 2007, the Washington Religious Society of Friends (Quakers) spearheaded legislative efforts to create an independent ombudsman position that would provide an alternative avenue of mediation between WADOC, WADOC staff, incarcerated people, and family members of the incarcerated. The resulting bill, SB 5295—sponsored by state Senators Jim Kastama, Dan Swecker, Karen Fraser, Jeanne Kohl-Welles, Chris Marr, Debbie Regala, Marilyn Rasmussen, and Rosemary McAuliffe—was not successful. In the years since, many other community groups have added their support for these legislative efforts. Annual attempts to pass an independent ombudsman bill began in 2013 with SB 5177, sponsored by Senators Mike Carrell and Steve Conway. In 2014, Senators Conway, Jeannie Darneille, Steve O'Ban, Jeanne Kohl-Welles, and Annette Cleveland sponsored SB 6399. In 2015, Senators Jeannie Darneille, Rosemary McAuliffe, Jeanne Kohl-Welles, Steve O'Ban, Maralyn Chase, Bob Hasegawa, Karen Keiser, Kirk Pearson, Steve Conway, and David Frockt sponsored SB 5505, with Representatives Luis Moscoso, Roger Goodman, Eric Pettigrew, Sherry Appleton, Tina Orwall, Timm Ormsby, and Laurie Jinkins sponsoring companion bill HB 2005.

In the 2016 legislative session, Senators Mark Miloscia, Christine Rolfes, Kirk Pearson, Steve O'Ban, Steve Conway, and Rosemary McAuliffe sponsored unsuccessful SB 6154, with Representatives Luis Moscoso, Eric Pettigrew, Sherry Appleton, Tina Orwall, David Sawyer, Cindy Ryu, Derek Stanford, Gerry Pollet, Teri Hickel, Steve Bergquist, and Sharon Tomiko Santos sponsoring companion HB 2817.

In the 2017-2018 legislative session an ombudsman bill, HB 1889, passed both chambers of the legislature.

WADOC opposed these legislative efforts. In 2016, WADOC created its own internal ombudsman position. Carlos Lugo, who had previously worked on a special WADOC project concerning visitation access for Latino incarcerated people, was hired as the first WADOC ombudsman.

== Contraband ==
The WADOC Intelligence and Investigations Unit asked the FBI to become involved in the investigation of employee contraband smuggling at WADOC's Monroe Correctional Complex smuggling in December 2015. A correctional officer was arrested on September 29, 2016. FBI agents determined the officer was accepting bribes of up to $1,000 to smuggle contraband into the prison.

== Sustainability in Prisons Project ==
At Cedar Creek Corrections Center in 2003, the Washington State Department of Corrections and The Evergreen State College founded the Sustainability in Prisons Project (SPP). Dan Pacholke was Cedar Creek Correctional Center's superintendent at the time, and started composting and water catchment programs to save money and create meaningful work for the men incarcerated at the minimum security facility. Dr. Nalini Nadkarni, a member of the faculty at Evergreen, asked for incarcerated people to join her in a study to grow native mosses, and Cedar Creek welcomed her proposal. From here, the partnership between Evergreen and WADOC strengthened and expanded. In the decade plus since, SPP has expanded to several other WADOC prisons. Incarcerated people raise endangered species and carry out impressive composting operations using recycled construction materials.

== Timeline of key events ==
- 1981 - New Department of Corrections is created to oversee correctional institutions previously overseen by Department of Social and Health Services.
- 1984 - Sentencing Review Act (SRA) overhauls state's criminal code.
- 1995 - Correctional Industries centralized factory food production begins at Airway Heights Correctional Center.
- 2000s - Incarcerated people are required to order food packages from a few select contract vendors instead of local grocery stores.
- 2003 - DOC and Evergreen State College collaborate to found the Sustainability in Prisons Project
- 2009 - Incarcerated people are required to wear uniforms instead of personal clothing.
- 2011 - Line of duty death of Officer Jayme Biendl brings increased attention to security.
- 2015 - State Senate passes SB 5650, establishing a medical subaccount exempt from WADOC deductions to incarcerated people's personal accounts.
- 2016 - WADOC hires an internal ombudsman. Secretary Dick Morgan publicly states that the WADOC will phase out the use of the word "offender".

== Washington Way ==
The Washington Way is a WADOC initiative partnered with Amend at the University of California San Francisco focused on building a humane corrections environment and changing prison culture. Washington Way takes principles from Norwegian correctional styles. WADOC has made several visits to Norwegian prisons to see how they operate, and partners with Oregon, California, among other US states to improve correctional practices in the US.

== See also ==
- List of law enforcement agencies in Washington (state)
- List of U.S. state prisons
- List of United States state correction agencies
