= Murder of the Goldmark family =

1985 antisemitic and anticommunist mass murder

- Location: Seattle, Washington, U.S.
- Date: December 24, 1985; 40 years ago
- Deaths: 4
- Perpetrator: David Lewis Rice
- Motive: Anti-communism; Antisemitism
- Verdict: Guilty
- Convictions: Aggravated first degree murder (4 counts)
- Sentence: Death; commuted to life imprisonment

On December 24, 1985 (Christmas Eve), David Lewis Rice murdered the entire Goldmark family at their house in Seattle, believing the father Charles Goldmark was a major Jewish Communist official plotting to surrender America to a World Communist government.

John E. Goldmark was a leading Democratic local leader. He was elected as a state representative in the Washington House of Representatives in Olympia in 1956. In 1962, Goldmark was accused by two local newspapers of being a Communist sympathizer. The newspaper staff used as arguments in their campaign the fact that Charles Goldmark (John's son) went to the liberal Reed College and that Sally (John's wife) had joined the Communist Party of the United States (CPUSA) during the Great Depression. Sally's interest in folk music was also cited as evidence of her communist sympathies. The former Republican state legislator and former chairman of the Washington State Un-American Activities Committee Albert F. Canwell, in a taped interview, had accused Sally of having belonged to the CPUSA in 1948 - five years later than when she claimed to have left the party. Canwell once referred to Sally Goldmark as a "lesbian communist."

John Goldmark died in October 1979 from cancer, while Sally Goldmark died in May 1985.Their son Charles was a lawyer, and he served as a legal counsel for the Washington State Democratic Party. He also served as the delegate for Gary Hart during the 1984 Democratic National Convention. David Lewis Rice was a welder who was dismissed due to bankruptcy. He was homeless in 1982 when a new love interest introduced him to the Duck Club, an antisemitic, anti-communist, right-wing and ultra-nationalist study group led by the retired U.S. Army Colonel Gordon "Jack" Mohr, self-proclaimed "national military commander" of the Christian Patriots Defense League. Rice started to believe in a "Communist conspiracy aided by the international bankers and the Federal Reserve Board", as his defense counsel later said. Among the subjects discussed during the Duck Club meetings were the alleged Communist ties of the Goldmark family, leading Rice to research the subject. Rice concluded that Charles Goldmark was the “regional director of the American Communist Party” and that Rice had to act to save America.

== Background ==
=== The Goldmark family ===
==== Moving to Washington ====
In 1942, John Goldmark, a Harvard-educated lawyer and U.S. Navy officer from New York State, married, in Washington D.C., Irma "Sally" Ringe, a New Deal worker from Brooklyn, New York. After World War II, they moved to Washington State with their son, Charles, born in January 1944, and bought a ranch 250 miles northeast of Seattle, in Okanogan County, Washington, out of a desire to live off the land.

By the 1960s, the Goldmark ranch was 500 acres. They cultivated wheat and raised cattle there. John Goldmark became a leading Democratic local leader, being elected as a state representative in the Washington House of Representatives in Olympia in 1956. Goldmark was re-elected two more times in the Okanogan Republican-leaning district.

==== Accusations of Communism ====
In 1962, while Goldmark prepared for his fourth re-election, he was accused by two local newspapers of being a Communist sympathizer.

Catching Up With John

... he has voted invariably with the extreme leftists and has sponsored measures designed to socialize our economy and convert us into a Welfare State ... In his campaign at home he has deceived the people with high-sounding phrases, all the while carefully concealing his true political philosophies ... But the voters ... are at last finding out that John Goldmark is not their representative; that he is a tool of a monstrous conspiracy to remake America into a totalitarian state which would throttle freedom and crush individual initiative.

— Ashley Holden, Tonasket Tribune

In the "Catching Up With John" editorial in the Tonasket Tribune by editor Ashley Holden, John Goldmark was accused of being complicit in “a monstrous conspiracy to remake America into a totalitarian state which would throttle freedom and crush individual initiative.” On another occasion, Holden described Goldmark as "the idol of the Pinkos and ultra-liberals who infest every session of the legislature." Holden and other confederates used as arguments in their campaign the fact that Charles Goldmark went to the liberal Reed College and that Sally, during the Great Depression, joined the Communist Party of the United States (CPUSA). Sally's interest in folk music was also cited as evidence of her communist sympathies. Former Republican state legislator and former chairman of the Washington State Un-American Activities Committee Albert F. Canwell, in a taped interview, accused Sally of having belonged to the CPUSA in 1948 - five years later than when she claimed to have left the party. Canwell once referred to Sally Goldmark as a "lesbian communist."

On August 23, 1962, a "non-political" rally was held at an Okanogan American Legion hall, presided over by Loris Gillespie, a local orchardist and former county Republican chairman. Gillespie accused the American Civil Liberties Union, of whose state committee John Goldmark was a member, of being a Communist front. Ashley Holden published the article "Commie Front Exposed by Al Canwell in Legion Talk" about this incident in the same Tonasket Tribune issue along with his editorial "Catching Up With John." After this 1962 political campaign smear, John Goldmark lost the nomination of his party.

The Goldmarks then hired attorney William Lee Dwyer and sued Holden and his allies for libel, winning $40,000 (U.S.) in damages. This ruling was later reversed on the basis of New York Times Co. v. Sullivan in a ruling which stated that, although the accusations were clearly false, there was no evidence they were done with malice.

The Goldmark family later moved to Seattle. John Goldmark never held political office again and died in 1979 of cancer. Sally Goldmark died in early 1985.

==== Charles Goldmark ====
After graduating from Reed College in Portland, Oregon, Charles enrolled in Yale Law School and joined an officers training program to become a military intelligence officer. While serving in Europe, he met Annie J. Carlstén, a French interpreter whose father was Swedish while her mother was French. Annie and Charles soon married, moved to Seattle, and had two sons. Charles joined the law firm Davis, Wright, Todd, Riese, and Jones, before leaving the firm in 1976 with his friend, Jim Wickwire (one of the first two U.S. mountain climbers to reach the K2 peak), to begin a new law firm, Wickwire, Lewis, Goldmark, and Schorr. Charles specialized in civil litigation. Meanwhile, his wife, Annie, continued her career in translating.

In addition to his legal work, Charles also worked in politics, becoming a legal counsel for the Washington State Democratic Party and serving as the delegate for Gary Hart during the 1984 Democratic National Convention.

=== David Lewis Rice ===
David Lewis Rice was born in 1958 in Durango, Colorado. His family moved during his childhood along with the father, who traveled across the Southwestern United States for his work in construction. At age four, Rice ran into a sliding glass door which shattered, cutting his right eyebrow and leaving him partially blind in that eye. At age ten, after an argument with his brother, he locked the door of his room and attempted to commit suicide by hanging himself. As a teenager, Rice had grown to 6 feet 2 inches (187.96 cm). Rice dropped out of high school in the 10th grade and joined the US Navy before being discharged during training. Later, Rice married and had a son, but his wife sued for divorce. He worked as a welder before being dismissed due to bankruptcy.

In 1982, Rice was living in Seattle, sleeping in homeless shelters or in cars before meeting 40-year-old naturopath Anne Davis, with whom he had a relationship, before moving to her Capitol Hill apartment to live from time to time. Anne Davis introduced Rice to the Duck Club, an antisemitic, anti-communist, right-wing and ultra-nationalist study group led by retired U.S. Army Colonel Gordon "Jack" Mohr, self-proclaimed "national military commander" of the Christian Patriots Defense League, and whose Seattle chapter was led by former Boeing employee Homer Brand. Rice was so enamored with Mohr's articles, he attempted to contact Mohr in Mississippi where he lived, only to be rebuffed. Rice started to believe in a "Communist conspiracy aided by the international bankers and the Federal Reserve Board", as his defense counsel later said.

Among the subjects discussed during Duck Club meetings were the alleged Communist ties of the Goldmark family, leading Rice to research the subject. Rice concluded that Charles Goldmark was the “regional director of the American Communist Party” and that Rice had to act to save America. Meanwhile, Rice's financial situation began to worsen, as he found himself deeper and deeper in debt and his unemployment compensation ran out 4 or 5 months prior to the murders.

== Murder ==
=== Preparation ===
Rice's girlfriend, Anne Davis, had gone on vacation for Christmas and had left food and money for him with the understanding he would be out when she came back. Rice pawned Davis's television for $10.

Days before the murders, Rice tested chloroform on himself and bought a pair of manacles and a toy pistol. He also bought an M1 Garand but decided not to use it because of the noise it would have made. These items and other tools and weapons appeared in a list entitled "Basic Armament for One Man Mission" in a notebook, written by Rice, found by police in a search of Anne Davis' apartment two days after the crime.

Rice planned to torture Charles to force him to give a list of Communist operatives and then murder him, in order to work his way up to the ladder of the Communist hierarchy. Rice also wanted the Goldmarks' money, since he imagined they were wealthy. It was later determined that Rice's motivation to commit the murders was based equally on both political and financial factors.

On approximately November 1, Rice traveled to the Goldmarks' neighborhood to "see what kind of house it was and just to check out the neighborhood" and failed to see to what Charles and Annie looked like. One week later, Rice visited Goldmark's office building but failed to see Charles and in December he went back to their house and was not able to see if they lived there.

=== Massacre of the Goldmark family ===
On Christmas Eve 1985, Rice, posing as a taxi cab driver who had a package to deliver, gained entry to the Seattle home of Charles Goldmark. Rice had previously gone to the house of a neighbor before learning he was mistaken, and then going to the Goldmarks' house.

Rice confessed to having wanted for the previous six months to murder the Goldmarks, but insisted that he did not include the Goldmark children, who he thought would have been absent the day of the killings. Rice stated: "The children - I didn't expect them." However once he found them in the house on the day of the attack Rice determined that he had to kill them as well.

At 7:10 p.m., he tied the family up: Charles, his wife Annie, and their two children, 12-year-old Derek and 10-year-old Colin. He then chloroformed them after robbing them of their valuables (including a bank card Charles gave him a false access number for, and the keys for their car) and learning guests were coming for 7:30. Fearing he could not have enough time to extract information about the Communist conspiracy from Charles, and that the Goldmark family could identify him, he searched for a weapon, settled for a steam iron and a kitchen knife and bludgeoned and stabbed them to death before leaving.

During the investigation, it was determined that, after they were chloroformed, Rice first struck Charles with four to five blows with the pointed edge of the steam iron to the head and then did the same to Annie, striking her strongly enough to cause her to move; after additional blows, she ceased to move. Rice then did the same to the children before checking whether their father was still alive by seeing whether the arteries on the neck still had any activity pointing to a beating pulse. Finding both Charles and Annie were still alive, Rice "decided to complete the job with the knife" and started with Charles, inserting the blade in the wound created by the bludgeoning, hitting the opposite end of the skull to a depth of five inches through the brain. Rice did the same to the children and then, not finding any skull injury on Annie, stabbed her in the chest.

=== Discovery of the bodies ===
As planned, at 7:30 p.m., the guests arrived at the Goldmark residence, rang the doorbell and, since nobody answered, went back home. Once there, they phoned the Goldmarks and grew alarmed when the Goldmarks still did not answer, at which point the guests returned to the Goldmark residence.

This time they heard moaning from inside the house. They drove to the nearby home of Jeffrey Haley, where they knew they could find a key to the Goldmark house, then returned to open the door with Jeffrey and his brother Peter. Once there, they climbed the stairs, entered the room and saw the entire family had been tied up. Annie had been stabbed in her chest while Charles and their two sons appeared to have been wounded in the head. Both parents had been handcuffed with their arms behind their backs. Charles was yelling and thrashing on the floor, not noticing the Haleys were present; the latter used a hacksaw to remove the handcuffs of Charles to ease his distress.

Police officers and firefighters came to the house. The police gathered evidence, finding the clothes iron and the kitchen knife, while firefighters helped the victims. Annie was pronounced dead at the scene. The firemen could not insert their fingers inside the sweaters that were so tightly wound around the necks of the boys. Blood was splattered on nearly every wall, especially around the bodies of the victims, indicating that the victims were struck while they were on the floor. The victims were soon sent to Harborview Medical Center where Colin died four days later, Charles held on for 16 days, and Derek lasted 37 days.

On the same evening, Christmas Eve 1985, shortly after his murderous assault on the Goldmark family, Rice made an attempt to retrieve items bearing his fingerprints at the crime scene, but gave up on that idea after seeing the heavy police presence there.

=== Arrest of David Lewis Rice ===
Two days later, on December 26, police received a phone call from Robert Brown, a.k.a. Husayn Omar Sayfuddiya, a Duck Club acquaintance with whom Rice lived since the murders, to tell them he believed his guest had been involved in the murders of the Goldmark family, basing this on a confession Rice wrote in his guestbook consisting of the sentence "To whom it may concern, I am the person you are looking for in the Goldmark case." Police came to Brown's residence, where he confirmed the guest was David Rice.

While waiting for detectives to come, police saw someone matching the description of Rice and pursued him. As they were closer to catching him, Rice drank a potion later revealed to be liquid nicotine.

At the police station, after receiving a Miranda warning, Rice was shown his guestbook and he confirmed his possession of the book and his authorship of several messages, including the confession. (Note: To whom it may concern, I am the person you are looking for in the Goldmark case. I know that what I did was a very terrible thing. That is why I am as you see me now. I want it perfectly understood that no one else had anything whatsoever to do with what I did. I went to great lengths to make sure of that. The person that I live with doesn't even know that I am wanted on a different charge. She received a couple of messages on her machine, but I erased them before she got to them. I did not use the rifle that I purchased a few weeks ago, instead, I fooled them with a toy pistol which you will find in the storage locker. I threw the rifle ["pistol" was originally written, then crossed out] away a couple of weeks ago. Again, I want it understood that no one knew anything about this, so please do not cause any unnecessary suffering to innocent people. I think that I've already done enough. I guess I should tell you why I did what I did. That way, you won't have to ask other people about it. My life is a mess. It has been since my wife left. Anne has been trying to help me straighten it out, but I'm afraid) He agreed to complete the confession, and wrote the following:

I am afraid that she isn't able to do much for me. I am much too far gone. When I left high school, I could go out and get a job in any town, at any time I needed one. When I got married, jobs were starting to get scarce. I had to do more walking & searching to find work. I found myself more and more on the unemployment line, which was getting longer and longer. I went to the government offices to see what I could do to alleviate my employment situation, and they recommended that I go to school & learn engineering.

At this point Rice asked for an attorney and Seattle lawyer William Lanning came to speak to him for an hour and a half, concluding with Lanning telling the policemen his client agreed to speak to them even though he knew his declarations could be used against him. Rice confessed the crime to two detectives in a tape-recorded testimony, explaining his motivations, his preparations for the attacks, and manner of the murders.

Rice also told Homer Brand that he “dumped the top communist. There were four involved.” After Rice's arrest, information and documents about municipal bond lawyer and civic activist James R. Ellis were found among his belongings, leading to speculation that Ellis was the next target.

== Legal process ==
At trial, Rice invoked the insanity defense, arguing that he was not responsible for the crime; his lawyer, Anthony Savage, stated that Rice's associations with right-wing groups exacerbated his paranoid delusional disorder, which three doctors, examining Rice, all diagnosed. Prosecution was assured by Bill Downing and his assistant Bob Lasnik.

Rice was convicted on June 5, 1986, of aggravated murder for the four deaths and was sentenced to death five days later, on June 10, 1986.

The conviction was later overturned on the grounds that Lannen had provided him with an incompetent defense. Rice repeatedly displayed psychotic symptoms throughout his trial, but his attorney failed to emphasize them in his defense.

In 1998, Rice pleaded guilty to the crimes in exchange for avoiding the death penalty. He remains in prison serving out a life sentence.

In the circles in which the defendant moved, there had been under discussion of John Goldmark's activities without any great attention being given to the accuracy of the false allegations.

— William Downing, New York Times

The Goldmark Murders remain one of the most notorious antisemitic hate crimes as well as politically motivated killings in recent memory in the United States, even though the victims were not actually Jewish and Communist as the killer mistakenly believed. There was a controversy over whether Rice had been influenced by the Duck Club. It also remains a cause célèbre of capital punishment proponents, since Rice avoided death based only on the ineptitude of his attorney's work at trial.

Rice is currently incarcerated in Washington State Penitentiary and was interviewed for the 1987 PBS documentary, Faces of the Enemy.

== Legacy ==
In 1986, the Goldmark Foundation was established, with the purpose of giving to the cause the Goldmark family would have supported, contributing more than $200,000 to various local causes, or $500,000 if matching dollars were also counted. In the beginning, it gave small grants, around $2,500, to small nonprofit groups that needed modest boosts, before switching to give more substantial grants, in the range of $25,000 range, to make an enduring impact. Among the beneficiaries were:

- The Young Men’s Christian Association, to help disadvantaged children to attend Camp Orkila on Orcas Island, in the Salish Sea, where the Goldmark children went to camp.
- The nonprofit Legal Foundation of Washington, which counts Charles Goldmark among its founders, to pay for the Goldmark Equal Access to Justice Internships for law students, providing law interns to organizations that cannot usually afford them yet need them in order to function.
- The Seattle-Nantes Sister City Association for scholarships furthering understanding between France and the United States.
- The Bush School, where the Goldmark boys studied.
- The Harborview Medical Center.
- The Victims Assistance Unit of the Seattle Police Department, whose work for the victims after the massacre were saluted by friends.

In 1992, a plaque was inaugurated in Seattle, at Madrona Drive and Lake Washington Boulevard, in the newly named Goldmark Overlook, to honor the Goldmark family. This plaque read:

"This Overlook is Named in Memory of Charles, Annie, Derek and Colin Goldmark, Who Loved Seattle and Its Open Spaces."

It was the first time in Seattle that private citizens who had been murder victims ever received a memorial. The Goldmark Foundation donated $15,000 for the $83,000 overlook, a part of the plan by the local Parks and Recreation Department to beautify the lakefront.

Charles Goldmark's brother, Peter J. Goldmark, is former Washington State Commissioner of Public Lands and head of the Washington Department of Natural Resources.

== Bibliography ==
- Rule, Ann (1994). "Black Christmas". You Belong to Me and Other True Crime Cases. Simon and Schuster.
