= Senator Palumbo =

Senator Palumbo may refer to:

- Anthony Palumbo (born 1970), New York State Senate
- Corey Palumbo (born 1972), West Virginia State Senate
- Guy Palumbo (born 1973), Washington State Senate
- Mario Palumbo (1933–2004), West Virginia State Senate
