= Senator Garber =

Senator Garber may refer to:

- Daniel Garber (politician) (1875–1959), Nebraska State Senate
- Gottlieb Garber (1859–1932), Washington State Senate
- Jacob A. Garber (1879–1953), Virginia State Senate
- Martin Garber (1829–1903), Iowa State Senate
