= Grace Cole =

Grace Cole may refer to:

- Grace "Gracie" Cole (1924–2006), British trumpeter and bandleader
- Grace Cole (politician) (1922–2001), American politician
