= Ericks =

Ericks is a surname. Notable people with the surname include:

- John Ericks (born 1967), American baseball player
- Mark Ericks, American politician
- Siv Ericks (1918–2005), Swedish actress
