= Joe Wicks =

Joe Wicks may refer to:

- Joe Wicks (coach) (born 1985), British fitness coach, television presenter and author
- Joe Wicks (EastEnders), a character from British soap opera EastEnders
- Joseph Wicks (1896–1984), US judge of the Okanogan County, Washington and Ferry County, Washington Superior Court
