= List of Washington state work releases =

This is a list of state work releases in Washington housing adult inmates administered by the Washington State Department of Corrections (WADOC).

== Overview ==
The department currently has 13 work release facilities. All but two of these facilities is operated by contractors, who manage the daily safety and security and have oversight of the facilities full-time (24-hours a day, 7-days per week). Department staff are located on-site to assist in supervision, monitoring, and case management of the offenders and monitoring of the contracts.

Offenders housed in work release facilities have progressed from full confinement to partial confinement and are required to seek, secure and maintain employment in the community, and contribute to their cost of room and board. This model is designed to ensure offenders have employment and housing plans when they are released to communities.

== Current Work Releases ==
Facility	Location	County	Population Gender(s)	Specialized Population
Ahtanum View Work Release	Yakima	Yakima County	Male; Female	N/A
Bellingham Work Release	Bellingham	Whatcom County	Male; Female	N/A
Bishop Lewis Work Release	Seattle	King County	Male	N/A
Brownstone Work Release	Spokane	Spokane County	Male	N/A
Clark County Work Release	Vancouver	Clark County	Male; Female	N/A
Eleanor Chase House Work Release	Spokane	Spokane County	Female	N/A
Helen B. Ratcliff Work Release	Seattle	King County	Female	N/A
Longview Work Release	Longview	Cowlitz County	Male; Female	N/A
Olympia Work Release	Olympia	Thurston County	Male; Female	N/A
Peninsula Work Release	Port Orchard	Kitsap County	Male; Female	N/A
Progress House Work Release	Tacoma	Pierce County	Male; Female	N/A
Reynolds Work Release	Seattle	King County	Male	N/A
Tri-Cities Work Release	Kennewick	Benton County	Male; Female	N/A
