= Cothern =

Cothern is a surname. Notable people with the surname include:

- Barbara Cothern, American politician
- D. Jason Cothern (born 1970), United States Space Force major general

== See also ==
- Cotter family
