= Mike Sherstad =

American politician

Member of the Washington House of Representatives from the 1st district Position 2
- In office January 9, 1995 – January 11, 1999
- Preceded by: Linda S. Johnson
- Succeeded by: Jeanne Edwards

Personal details
- Born: May 18, 1965 (age 61) Seattle, Washington
- Party: Republican

Mike Sherstad (born May 18, 1965) is an American politician who represented the 1st district in the Washington House of Representatives from 1995 to 1999.
