= Joseph Wicks =

American judge

Joseph Wicks (September 19, 1896– January 1984) was a judge of the Okanogan County, Washington and Ferry County, Washington Superior Court, where he served for 15 years, and as one of the defense attorneys in Goldmark vs. Canwell.

== Life and work ==
Wicks, one-quarter Cherokee, was born in Braggs, Indian Territory and was enrolled in the Cherokee Nation. He graduated in 1917 from a Baptist Mission school, Bacone College, and joined the U.S. Army, where he served in France during World War I, returning the U.S. in 1919. He attended the University of Oklahoma 1919–1920, then served as a deputy U.S. marshal in Muskogee, Oklahoma 1921–1923. He studied law at George Washington University in Washington, D.C. 1923–1926, and clerked in the Department of Justice. He was admitted to the Oklahoma Bar but did not practice there. Instead, he spent a year working for the U.S. Treasury Department before becoming an FBI agent, a position he held until 1928. According to Lawney Reyes, he worked closely with Eliot Ness, and was instrumental in putting Al Capone in prison.

He briefly went into private practice in 1928 in Alaska, but soon relocated to Washington state, his home for the rest of his life. He practiced law in Seattle, Grand Coulee and Okanogan. He came to Grand Coulee around the time construction was beginning on the Grand Coulee Dam. He became Grand Coulee's first city attorney, despite being a Republican in the overwhelmingly Democratic town. He was elected a Washington Superior Court judge in 1946, serving in Okanogan and Ferry counties until 1960.

After leaving the bench, he returned to private practice, establishing Wicks Thomas firm in Okanogan. In 1963 and 1964 Wicks served as one of the defense attorneys in Goldmark vs. Canwell, in which state legislator John Goldmark unsuccessfully brought a libel action against Albert F. Canwell, who accused him of being a member of the Communist Party. From 1965 to 1970 he was tribal attorney for the Colville Confederated Tribes. In 1973 he served on pro tempore on the Washington Supreme Court, dealing with the constitutional questions of Yelle vs. Kramer.
