= Wilbur G. Hallauer =

American politician

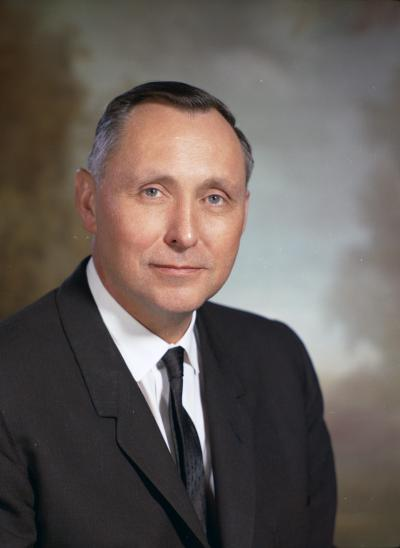
- Hallauer in 1967

Member of the Washington House of Representatives from the 1st district
- In office January 10, 1949 – January 14, 1957
- Preceded by: Robert M. French
- Succeeded by: John Goldmark

Member of the Washington Senate from the 1st district
- In office January 14, 1957 – January 13, 1969
- Preceded by: George D. Zahn
- Succeeded by: Francis E. Holman

Personal details
- Born: May 29, 1914 Webster, New York, U.S.
- Died: December 19, 2013 (aged 99) Oroville, Washington, U.S.
- Party: Democratic
- Education: University of Washington

Wilbur George "Web" Hallauer (May 29, 1914 – December 19, 2013) was a politician in the U.S. state of Washington.

Hallauer was born 1914 in Webster, New York, to George and Amelia (née Klauss) Hallauer, his father a fruit farmer and merchant. The family relocated to near Yakima, Washington around 1926 and Hallauer attended the local high school (class of 1931), Yakima Junior College, and the University of Washington. After university, he worked in the geology field.

After starting his political career as a member of the city council of Oroville, Washington in 1943, he served in the Washington State Senate for District 1, encompassing parts of King County from 1957 to 1969. He also served in that same district from 1949 to 1957 in the Washington House of Representatives. He was a Democrat. From 1977 to 1980, Hallauer served as the state director of ecology, appointed by governor Dixy Lee Ray.

In 1942, he married Rose Marie Scacco, and the couple had two daughters. After divorcing his first wife in 1967, he later married Jo Pardee, the couple remained married until her death in 2010, aged 92. He resided in Oroville, and occasionally at a property in Savary Island, British Columbia. He published an autobiography in 2008.

Hallauer died in his sleep in Oroville in December 2013. He was 99.
