= Shelley Kloba =

American politician from Washington

Member of the Washington House of Representatives from the 1st district
- Incumbent
- Assumed office January 9, 2017 Serving with Davina Duerr
- Preceded by: Luis Moscoso

Personal details
- Born: Shelley A. Regan; 1966 or 1967 (age 59–60)
- Party: Democratic
- Education: University of Illinois (BS)
- Website: Official

Shelley A. Kloba (née Regan, born 1966 or 1967) is an American politician of the Democratic Party. She is a member of the Washington House of Representatives, representing the 1st district. She served on the Kirkland City Council from 2013 to 2016.
