= Fairfield, Washington =

- Town
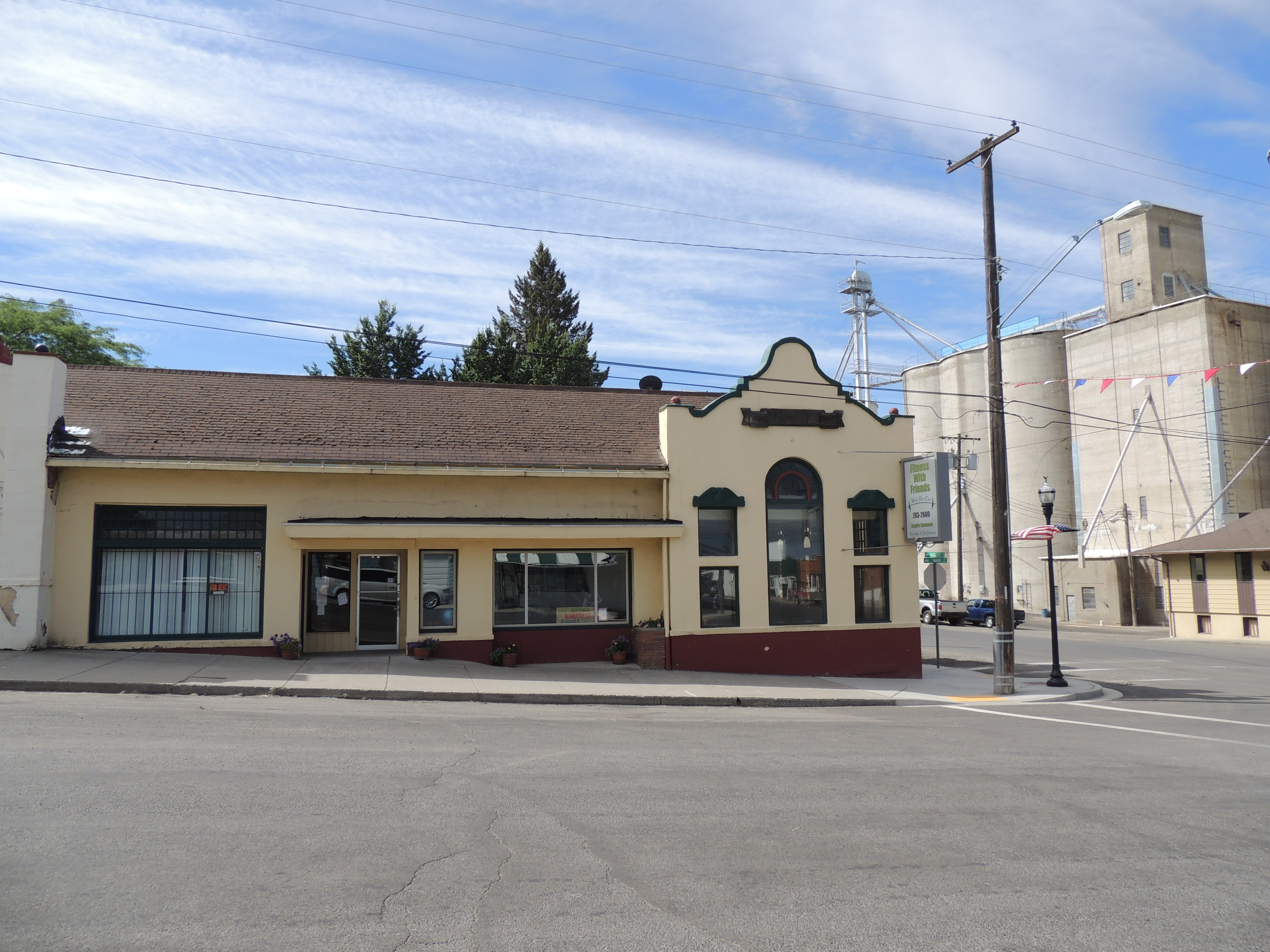
- Downtown Fairfield, July 2013

- Location of Fairfield, Washington
- Coordinates: 47°23′05″N 117°10′29″W
- Country: United States
- State: Washington
- County: Spokane

Government
  - Type: Mayor–council
  - Mayor: David Rafferty

Area
  - Total: 0.61 sq mi (1.59 km^{2})
  - Land: 0.61 sq mi (1.59 km^{2})
  - Water: 0 sq mi (0.00 km^{2})
- Elevation: 2,576 ft (785 m)

Population (2020)
  - Total: 589
  - Density: 959/sq mi (370/km^{2})
- Time zone: UTC−8 (Pacific (PST))
  - Summer (DST): UTC−7 (PDT)
- ZIP Code: 99012
- Area code: 509
- FIPS code: 53-22990
- GNIS feature ID: 2412612
- Website: fairfieldwa.com

Fairfield is a town in Spokane County, Washington, United States. The population was 589 at the 2020 census.

== History ==
In 1888, E.H. Morrison named Fairfield after a town his wife lived in "of that name in the East". Fairfield was officially incorporated on March 3, 1905.

== Flag Day ==
Fairfield is known for its long history celebrating Flag Day. In 2010, the town described itself as the "first city in all of the U.S. to celebrate Flag Day for 100 years". In the morning, there is a Fun Run at 7:00, followed by the official Flag Day parade down Main Street at approximately 10:30. Throughout the day, there are fun games and booths and a beer garden that's open all day.

== Businesses ==
Fairfield has several small businesses along Highway 27 and two blocks east along Main Street, including Fairfield Dental Clinic, St. John Hardware and Implement, Bank of Fairfield (main branch), Owl Pharmacy, Seehorn Tire, grain elevators, Westbound Systems and the U.S. Post Office. Western Insurance (Previously Fairfield Waverly Insurance) has operated in Fairfield since 1916.

== Education ==
Public education in Fairfield is serviced by Liberty School District #362.

There is a public library in Fairfield, which is part of the Spokane County Library District.

== Geography ==
According to the United States Census Bureau, the town has a total area of 0.62 square miles (1.61 km^{2}), all of it land.

== Demographics ==
Historical population
Census	Pop.	Note	%±
1910	308		—
1920	413		34.1%
1930	381		−7.7%
1940	364		−4.5%
1950	369		1.4%
1960	367		−0.5%
1970	469		27.8%
1980	582		24.1%
1990	446		−23.4%
2000	494		10.8%
2010	612		23.9%
2020	589		−3.8%
U.S. Decennial Census

=== 2010 census ===
As of the 2010 census, there were 612 people, 225 households, and 153 families living in the town. The population density was 987.1 inhabitants per square mile (381.1/km^{2}). There were 240 housing units at an average density of 387.1 per square mile (149.5/km^{2}). The racial makeup of the town was 96.1% White, 0.3% African American, 1.1% Native American, 0.2% Asian, 0.8% from other races, and 1.5% from two or more races. Hispanic or Latino of any race were 1.5% of the population.

There were 225 households, of which 32.4% had children under the age of 18 living with them, 53.8% were married couples living together, 9.8% had a female householder with no husband present, 4.4% had a male householder with no wife present, and 32.0% were non-families. Of all households 26.2% were made up of individuals, and 13.4% had someone living alone who was 65 years of age or older. The average household size was 2.59 and the average family size was 3.07.

The median age in the town was 40.2 years. Of the residents 24.7% were under the age of 18; 6.1% were between the ages of 18 and 24; 24.7% were from 25 to 44; 25.1% were from 45 to 64; and 19.4% were 65 years of age or older. The gender makeup of the town was 52.5% male and 47.5% female.

=== 2000 census ===
As of the 2000 census, there were 494 people, 172 households, and 121 families living in the town. The population density was 786.1 people per square mile (302.8/km^{2}). There were 194 housing units at an average density of 308.7 per square mile (118.9/km^{2}). The racial makeup of the town was 94.74% White, 0.81% African American, 1.21% Native American, 0.40% Asian, 1.01% from other races, and 1.82% from two or more races. Hispanic or Latino of any race were 2.43% of the population.

There were 172 households, out of which 32.0% had children under the age of 18 living with them, 59.9% were married couples living together, 6.4% had a female householder with no husband present, and 29.1% were non-families. Of all households 25.0% were made up of individuals, and 12.2% had someone living alone who was 65 years of age or older. The average household size was 2.57 and the average family size was 3.11.

In the town, the age distribution of the population shows 25.3% under the age of 18, 6.1% from 18 to 24, 24.5% from 25 to 44, 21.3% from 45 to 64, and 22.9% who were 65 years of age or older. The median age was 41 years. For every 100 females, there were 104.1 males. For every 100 females age 18 and over, there were 99.5 males.

The median income for a household in the town was $29,545, and the median income for a family was $40,694. Males had a median income of $30,625 versus $23,250 for females. The per capita income for the town was $14,022. About 17.1% of families and 20.5% of the population were below the poverty line, including 22.2% of those under age 18 and 13.5% of those age 65 or over.

== Notable people ==
- Horace W. Bozarth, businessman and farmer, member of the Washington House of Representatives
- Edward Kienholz, artist
- Richard Farnsworth, actor

== See also ==
- List of cities and towns in Washington
