= Davina Duerr =

American politician and architect

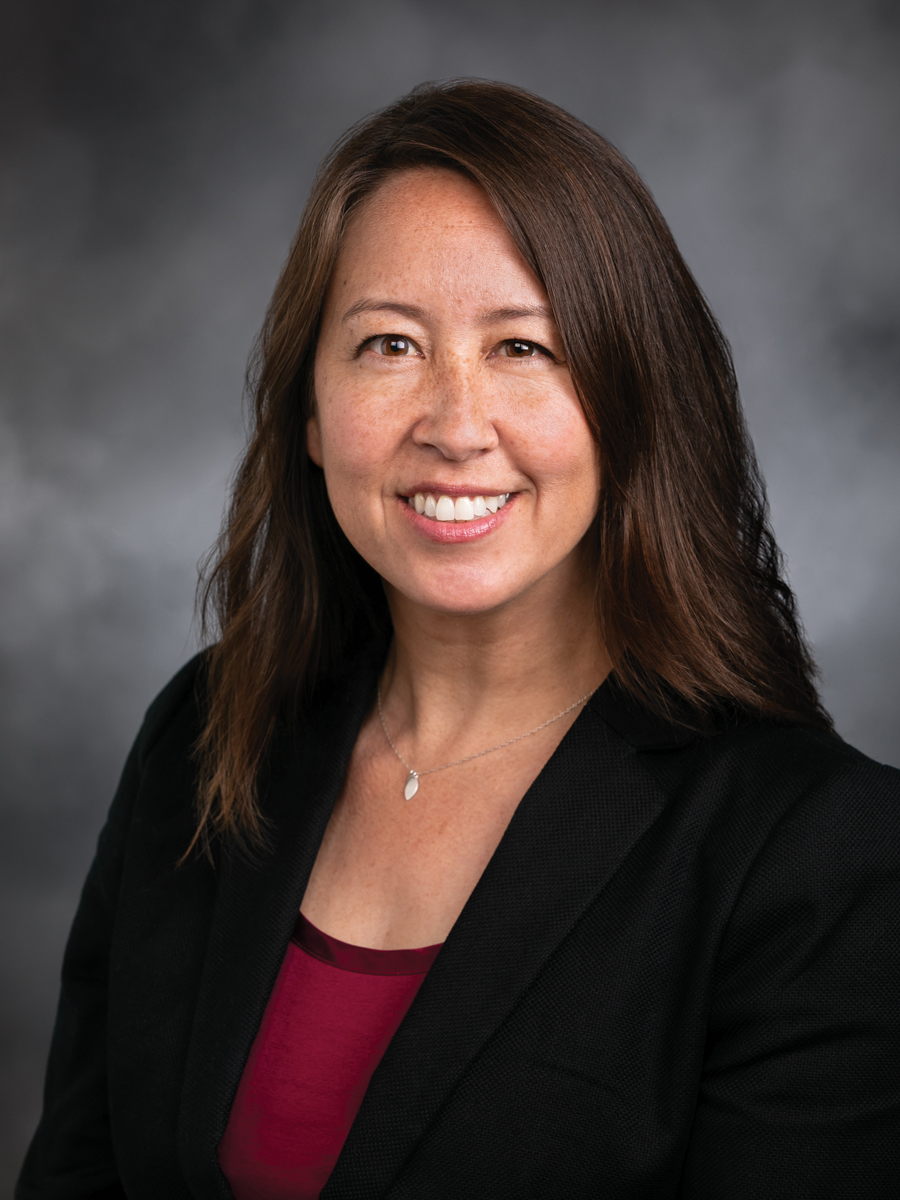

Member of the Washington House of Representatives from the 1st district
- Incumbent
- Assumed office July 1, 2019 Serving with Shelley Kloba
- Preceded by: Derek Stanford

Personal details
- Born: Davina Williams; March 3, 1971 (age 55)
- Party: Democratic
- Education: Syracuse University (BA)
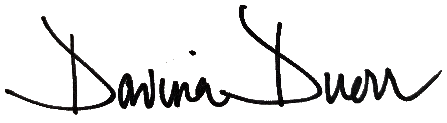
- Signature

Davina Williams Duerr (born March 3, 1971) is an American politician and architect who serves as a member of the Washington State House of Representatives, a position that she was appointed to on July 1, 2019. A member of the Democratic Party, she also served on the Bothell City Council for three years prior to being elected to her current position.

== Early life and education ==
Davina was born on March 3, 1971, the daughter of a Taiwanese immigrant. She grew up in Upstate New York and attended Syracuse University, where she graduated with a Bachelor of Arts in architecture and a minor in environmental geography.

== Career ==
In addition to serving in the state's House of Representatives, she works as a senior interior architect at an architecture firm in Bellevue, Washington.

Duerr is a former Deputy Mayor for the Bothell city council, on which she served from 2016 to 2019. She then went on to be appointed as a member of the Washington State House of Representatives, taking over Derek Stanford's seat after he was appointed to the Washington State Senate. Duerr was subsequently elected to a full term on November 3, 2020.

Before she was appointed, Duerr served on the Bothell Landmarks Preservation Board for ten years. She also co-founded the M.I.L.K. Money Project, which provides academic and financial services to underprivileged students.

=== Tenure ===
In her time as a representative, Duerr has focused on the issues of transportation and climate change. For example, she has served on the Eastside Transportation Partnership in an attempt to ease traffic and commute times in Bothell.

== Legislative positions ==
Duerr supports several environmental causes, including a reduction in the use of single-use plastic, lowering the level of acceptable greenhouse gasses, and environmental restoration initiatives.

Her voting record includes support for establishing background checks for the purchase of firearms. In 2020, Duerr sponsored a bill that would allot funds to improve local infrastructure in hopes of spurring economic development.

While on the Bothell City Council, she supported affordable housing in established Bothell neighborhoods.

== Awards ==
- 2021 City Champion Awards. Presented by Association of Washington Cities (AWC).
