= Linda S. Johnson =

American politician

Member of the Washington House of Representatives from the 1st district
- In office 1993–1995

Personal details
- Born: 1950 (age 75–76) Texas
- Party: Democratic
- Education: Shoreline Community College
- Alma mater: University of Texas; University of Washington

Linda Sue Johnson (born 1950) was an American politician. She was a Democrat, representing District 1 in the Washington House of Representatives which included parts of King and Snohomish counties, from 1993 to 1995.
