= Horace W. Bozarth =

American politician

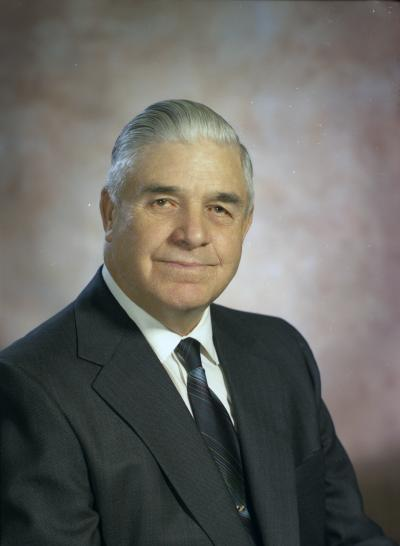
- Bozarth in 1971

Member of the Washington House of Representatives for the 1st district
- In office 1955–1967
- Preceded by: John R. Jones

Member of the Washington House of Representatives for the 12th district
- In office 1967–1973

Personal details
- Born: July 29, 1894 Fairfield, Washington, United States
- Died: June 2, 1976 (aged 81) Washington, United States
- Party: Democratic

Horace William Bozarth (July 29, 1894 – June 2, 1976) was an American politician in the state of Washington. He served in the Washington House of Representatives from 1961 to 1971.
