= Mark Ericks =

American politician

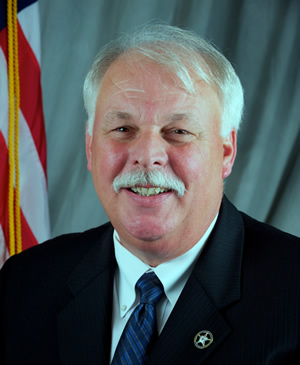

United States Marshal for the Western District of Washington
- In office September 9, 2010 – February 12, 2013
- President: Barack Obama
- Preceded by: William J. Hawe

Member of the Washington House of Representatives from the 1st district
- In office January 10, 2005 – September 7, 2010
- Preceded by: Jeanne Edwards
- Succeeded by: Luis Moscoso

Personal details
- Born: Mark Lloyd Ericks; July 24, 1951 (age 75)
- Party: Democratic
- Spouse: Deborah L. Parker
- Education: FBI National Academy; Northwest Law Enforcement Command College
- Profession: U.S. Marshal; State Representative; Chief of police Police detective Police officer
- Website: Official website

Mark Lloyd Ericks (born July 24, 1951) is a retired United States marshal and former Washington State representative.
