= Donn Charnley =

American politician (1928–2023)

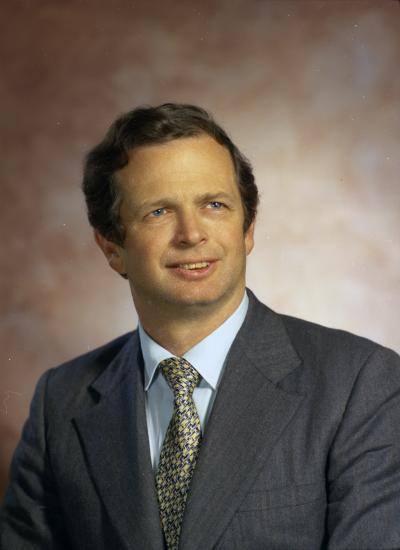
- Charnley in 1971

Member of the Washington House of Representatives 44th Pos. 1
- In office January 11, 1971 – November 25, 1980

Member of the Washington State Senate for the 44th
- In office January 11, 1971 – November 25, 1980

Washington House of Representatives 1st Pos.2
- In office January 10, 1983 – January 11, 1985

Member of the U.S. House of Representatives from 's Washington House of Representatives district
- In office January 10, 1983 – January 11, 1985

Personal details
- Born: April 3, 1928 Detroit, Michigan, United States
- Died: February 5, 2023 (aged 94)
- Party: Democratic
- Education: University of Washington Bachelor's and Masters in Geology and University of Minnesota M.A.
- Occupation: Professor of Geology at Shoreline Community College

Donn Charnley (April 3, 1928 – February 5, 2023) was an American politician in the state of Washington. Charnley served in the Washington House of Representatives and Washington State Senate as a Democrat from the 1st and 44th Districts from 1971 until 1985. In his second stint in the House from1983–1985, Charnley served as the Majority Whip.

== Early life and career ==
Charnely was born in Detroit to journalism professor Mitchell Charnley and writer Margery “Peg” Lindsay. He graduated from Broadway High School in Seattle in 1945. Charnley graduated with a bachelor's and master's degree in geology from the University of Washington, and later a master's degree in Educational Psychology from the University of Minnesota in 1965.

In 1964, Charnley started teaching at Shoreline Community College, retiring in 1996. After spending his first ten years in the Seattle Public Schools including a time at West Seattle High School.

== Political career ==
Charnley ran for, and was elected to, the Washington House of Representatives in 1970 in the 44th Legislative District. He served in this position until 1980. During this time served on the Transportation Committee and Local Government Committee.

In 1980, Charnley was elected to the Washington State Senate, serving until 1983. In 1982, Charnley was reelected to the State House in the 1st Legislative District. In 1984, Charnley unsuccessfully ran for the State Senate in the 1st Legislative District against Bill Kiskaddon by a 52 percent to 48 percent margin.
