= Jeanne Edwards =

American politician

Member of the Washington House of Representatives from the 1st district
- In office 1999–2005

Personal details
- Born: September 8, 1928 Detroit, Michigan
- Died: June 26, 2011 (aged 82) Bothell, Washington
- Party: Democratic

Jeanne Alice Edwards (September 8, 1928 – June 26, 2011) was an American politician. She was a Democrat, and represented District 1 in the Washington House of Representatives which included parts of northeast King County and south Snohomish County, from 1999 to 2005.

== Biography ==
Jeanne Edwards was of Irish descent and grew up in Colorado attending Catholic schools. From 1983 to 1993, she worked in hospital administration and public relations for Everett General Hospital. She served seven years on the Bothell City Council, four years on the board of directors for Community Transit and on the board of the Snohomish Health District. She retired from public service in 2008. Edwards died June 26, 2011, following a 13-year battle with kidney disease.
