= Guy Palumbo =

American politician and businessman

Member of the Washington Senate from the 1st district
- In office January 9, 2017 – May 24, 2019
- Preceded by: Rosemary McAuliffe
- Succeeded by: Derek Stanford

Personal details
- Born: 1973 (age 52–53) Bronx, New York
- Party: Democratic
- Education: Bentley University (BS)
- Website: Official

Guy F. Palumbo (born 1973) is an American politician and businessman who served in the Washington State Senate representing the 1st district. He resigned in May 2019 to take a position as a senior manager with Amazon. He was succeeded by Derek Stanford.
