= Rosemary McAuliffe =

American politician

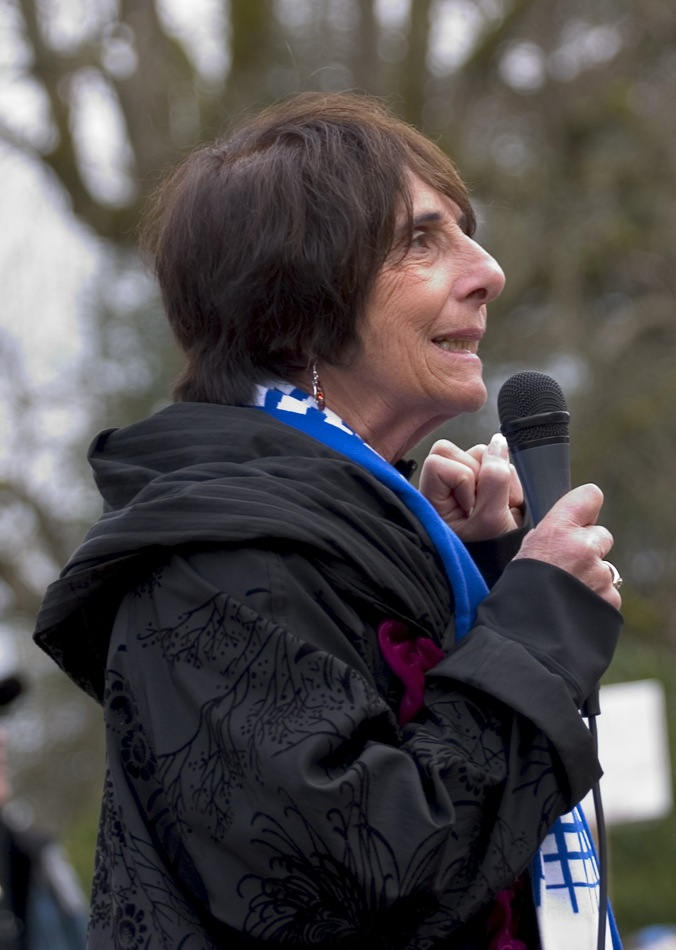
- McAuliffe in 2011

Bothell City Council, Position No. 3
- In office January 1, 2018 – January 1, 2022
- Preceded by: Del Spivey
- Succeeded by: Jenne Alderks

Member of the Washington Senate from the 1st district
- In office January 11, 1993 – January 9, 2017
- Preceded by: Patty Murray
- Succeeded by: Guy Palumbo

Personal details
- Born: Rosemary Ann Belmont; August 1, 1940 (age 86) Seattle, Washington, U.S.
- Party: Democratic
- Spouse: James Michael McAuliffe (1962-2021)
- Education: Seattle University (BS)
- Profession: Nurse; Small business owner
- Website: Official

Rosemary Ann McAuliffe (née Belmont; born August 1, 1940) is an American politician from the state of Washington. A member of the Democratic Party, she served in the Washington State Senate from 1993 to 2017.

== Early life and education ==
Rosemary Belmont was born on August 1, 1940. She attended Seattle University. She worked as a registered nurse and became interested in public education, which inspired her to enter public service.

== Career ==
McAuliffe served 14 years on the Northshore School District Board of Education and as chair of the Bothell Downtown Management Association, leading to the area's revitalization.

=== Washington State Senate (1993-2017) ===
She was elected as the Washington State Senator for the 1st District in 1992, beginning her term in 1993. This district includes Bothell, Mountlake Terrace, Brier, Maltby and parts of Lynnwood, Edmonds, and unincorporated Snohomish County.

She served on the Washington State Senate's Early Learning & K-12 Education Committee as a ranking member, as well as on the Higher Learning Committee and Joint Select Committee on Education Accountability.

=== Bothell City Council (2018-2022) ===
McAuliffe ran for Bothell city council in 2017. She won the election and served on the council from January 1, 2018, to January 1, 2022. She narrowly lost reelection in 2021.

== Personal life ==
McAuliffe married businessman Jim McAuliffe in 1962, with whom she had five sons and a daughter. She was married to McAuliffe until his death in 2021 in an accident.
