= Derek Stanford (politician) =

American statistician and politician from Washington

Member of the Washington State Senate from the 1st district
- Incumbent
- Assumed office July 1, 2019
- Preceded by: Guy Palumbo

Member of the Washington House of Representatives from the 1st district
- In office January 10, 2011 – July 1, 2019
- Preceded by: Al O'Brien
- Succeeded by: Davina Duerr

Personal details
- Born: October 18, 1970 (age 55) Michigan
- Party: Democratic
- Spouse: Cheryl A. Degolier
- Education: Harvey Mudd College (BS); Claremont Graduate University (MS); University of Washington (PhD); Advisor: Adrian Raftery
- Profession: Director of Analytics; Statistician
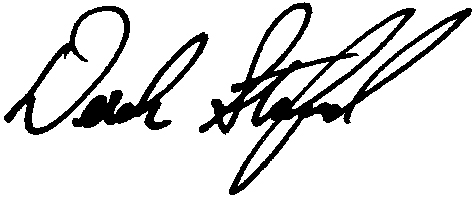
- Signature
- Website: Official

Derek C. Stanford (born October 18, 1970) is an American statistician and politician serving as a member of the Washington State Senate, representing the 1st district since 2019. A member of the Democratic Party, he previously served as a member of the Washington House of Representatives from 2011 to 2019.

In July 2019, Stanford was appointed to the Washington Senate after previously serving in the Washington House of Representatives. He was appointed to complete the term of Guy Palumbo who resigned to lobby for Amazon. Stanford was replaced in the House by Bothell City Councilmember Davina Duerr.
