= Luis Moscoso =

American politician (born 1950)

Member of the Washington House of Representatives from the 1st district
- In office December 3, 2010 – January 9, 2017
- Preceded by: Mark Ericks
- Succeeded by: Shelley Kloba

Personal details
- Born: Luis Saúl Moscoso; May 13, 1950 (age 76) Dubuque, Iowa, U.S.
- Party: Democratic
- Education: University of Iowa (BA)
- Profession: Government Relations Director; Union President; Transit Operator, Trainer, Dispatcher, and Supervisor
- Website: Official

Luis Saúl Moscoso (born May 13, 1950) is a former Washington State Representative from the 1st Legislative District, Position 2. He is a retired public servant having served 33 years in the public sector. He most recently served as the Director of Government Relations for the Washington Public Employees Association/UFCW Local 365 in Olympia, Washington where he oversaw and coordinated the WPEA's Legislative-Political program and issues advocacy agendas.

Moscoso served three terms as Secretary of the Washington State Democratic Party. He is President of the Board of the Institute for Washington's Future and has served on various public and community boards including the Transportation Policy Board (Puget Sound Regional Council), City of Mountlake Terrace Community Policing Advisory Board and the Neutral Zone.

He is an organizer and former Executive Committee member of the NAACP-Snohomish County. He organized the Snohomish County Citizens Committee for Human Rights that wrote and promoted a local county ordinance to establish a local Human Rights Commission.

Moscoso, a first generation Peruvian American, moved from Iowa to Snohomish County, Washington in 1976 after receiving his Bachelor of Arts in Anthropology from the University of Iowa. He later joined Community Transit and organized Amalgamated Transit Union Local 1576 for county bus drivers in 1977, serving four terms as their first President/Business Agent.
