= Duck Club =

The Duck Club was a right-wing organization within the United States, founded in 1980 by a Florida businessman Robert White when he was diagnosed with cancer. In summer 1980 White published a magazine, and a cartoon featuring a duck in a B1 bomber defending the Panama Canal became the namesake of the clubs White founded. In 1983, White's cancer was responding to treatment and he began to restructure the Duck Club organization to stem financial losses.

Among White's subscribers, David Lewis Rice was a member of the Duck Club. In 1985, Rice murdered four members of the Goldmark family in Seattle, mistakenly believing them to be Communists.

A 1988 report by the Center for World Indigenous Studies lists the Duck Club as one of several anti-Native American organizations operating in support of the Northwest Territorial Imperative, an irredentist movement to establish a White homeland in the Pacific Northwest.

On July 19, 1988, Robert White was shot and killed in rural Belize, in what was believed to be a robbery.
