= Gottlieb Garber =

American politician

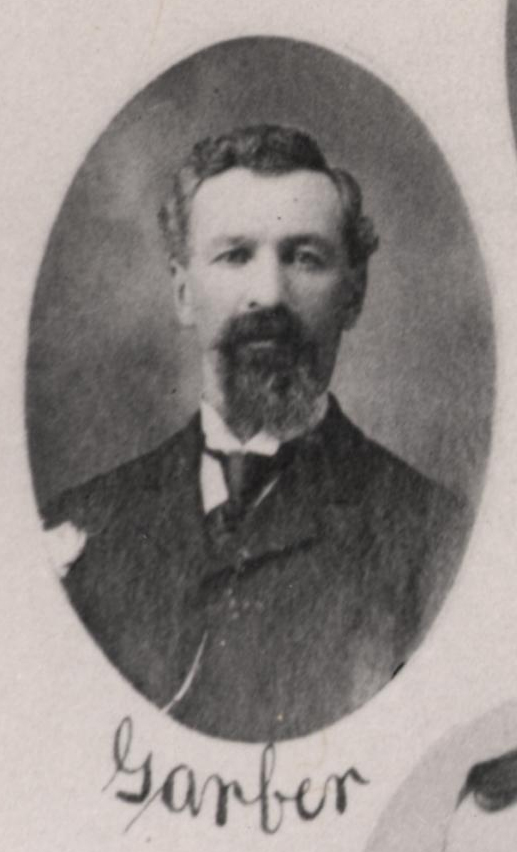
- Garber in 1901

Member of the Washington Senate from the 1st district
- In office January 14, 1901 – January 12, 1903
- Preceded by: F. M. Baum
- Succeeded by: George J. Hurley

Personal details
- Born: January 16, 1859 Switzerland
- Died: December 20, 1932 (aged 73) Kennewick, Washington, U.S.
- Party: Democratic

Gottlieb Garber (January 16, 1859 – December 20, 1932) was an American politician in the state of Washington. He served in the Washington State Senate from 1901 to 1903.
