= George M. Welty =

American politician

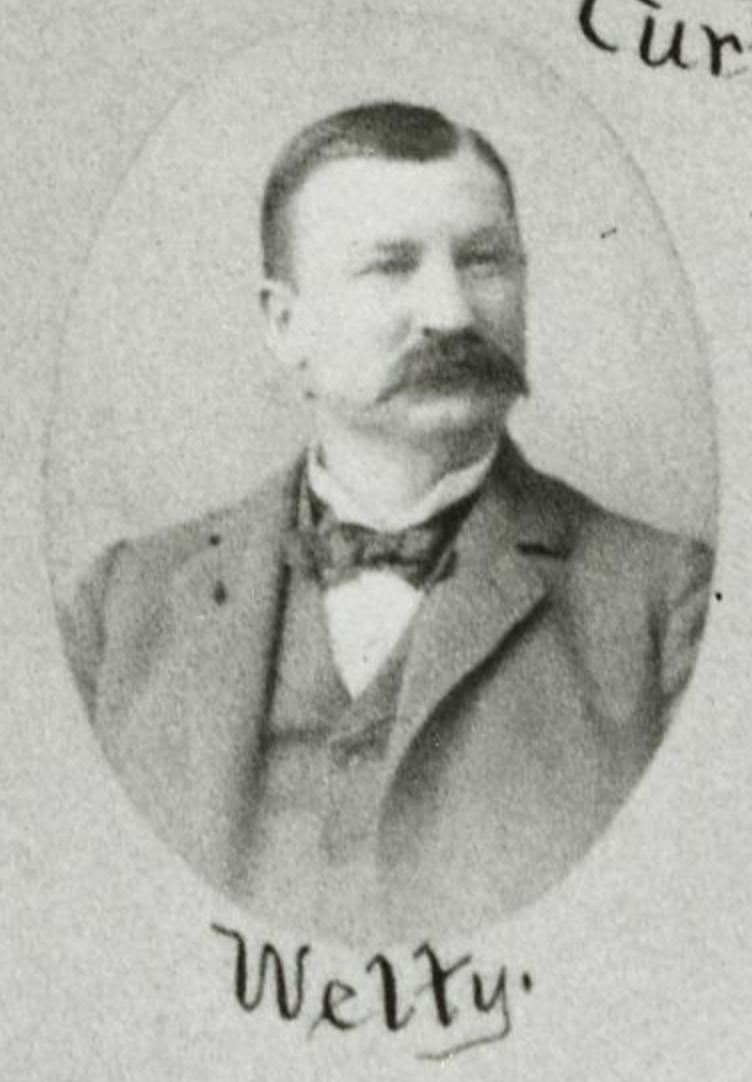
- Welty in 1899

Member of the Washington House of Representatives for the 1st district
- In office 1899–1901

Personal details
- Born: August 25, 1864 Lancaster County, Pennsylvania, United States
- Died: 1942 (aged 77–78)
- Party: Citizen's

George McClellan Welty (August 25, 1864 – 1942) was an American politician in the state of Washington. He served in the Washington House of Representatives.
