= Barbara Cothern =

American politician

Member of the Washington House of Representatives from the 1st district
- In office 1993–1995

Personal details
- Party: Democratic

Barbara S. Cothern was an American politician who served in the Washington State House for the 1st district. She was also a member of Snohomish County Council.
