= John R. Jones (Washington politician) =

American politician

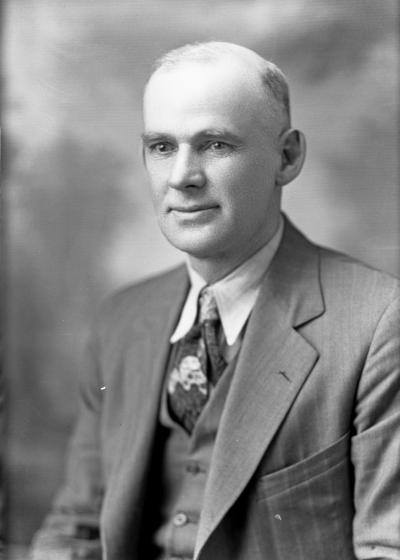
- Jones in 1933

Member of the Washington House of Representatives for the 1st district
- In office 1933–1955

Member of the Washington House of Representatives for the 18th district
- In office 1923–1933

Personal details
- Born: July 27, 1876 Lyons, Nebraska, United States
- Died: July 30, 1972 (aged 96) Waterville, Washington, United States
- Party: Democratic

John Robert Jones (July 27, 1876 – July 30, 1972) was an American politician in the state of Washington. He served in the Washington House of Representatives from 1923 to 1955.
