= Grace Cole (politician) =

American politician

Member of the Washington House of Representatives from the 1st district
- In office 1985–1999
- In office January 11, 1982 – 1983

Personal details
- Born: November 9, 1922 Idaho, US
- Died: March 17, 2001 (aged 78) Seattle, Washington, US
- Party: Democratic
- Education: Oregon State University

Grace Esther Cole (née Verhei; November 9, 1922 – March 17, 2001) was an American politician. She was a Democrat, representing District 1 in the Washington House of Representatives which included parts of King County, from 1882 to 1983, and 1985 to 1999. Cole was raised in Sagle, Idaho and attended Washington State College.
