= Albert F. Canwell =

American politician

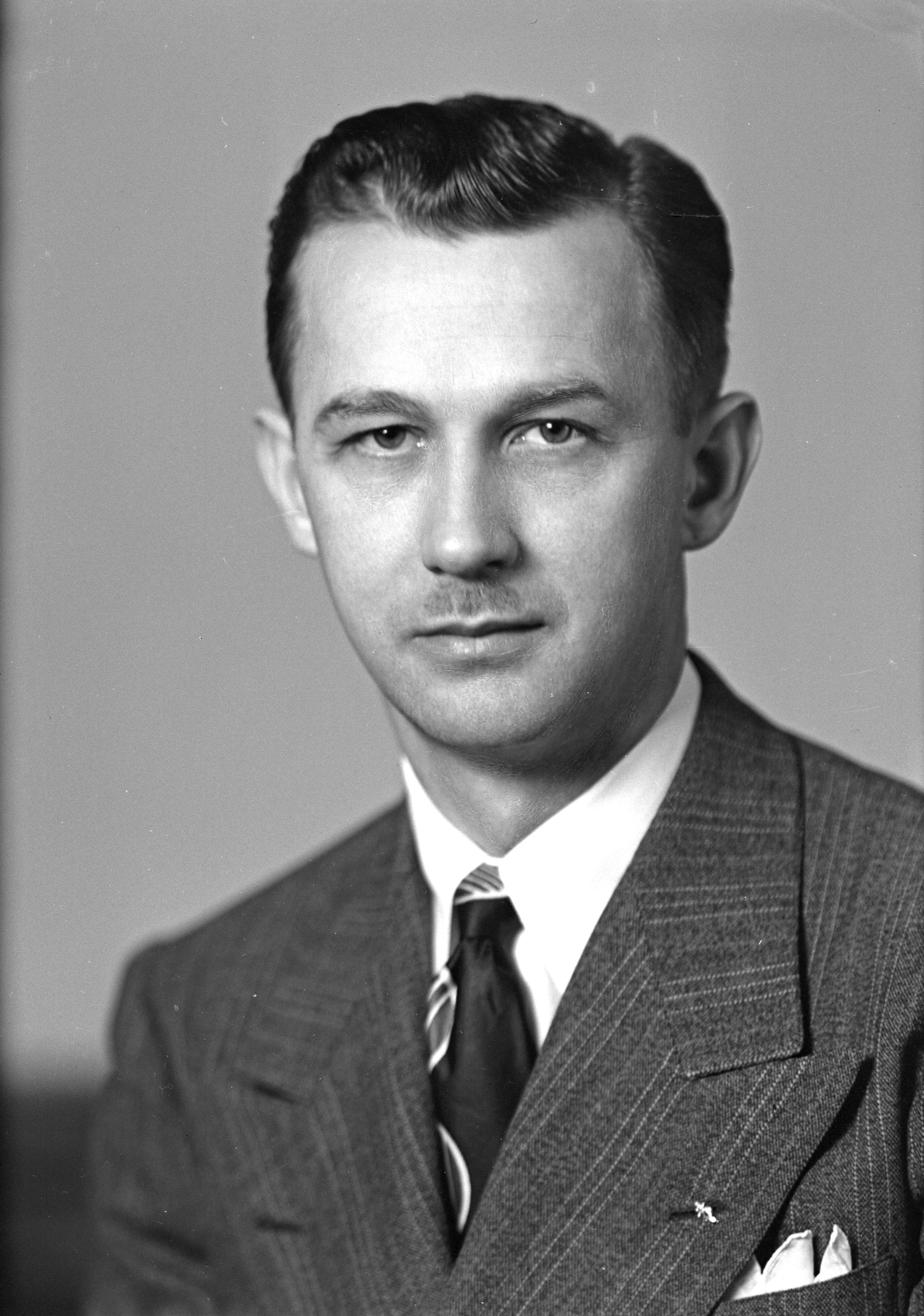
- Canwell c. 1947

Member of the Washington House of Representatives from the 5th (Spokane) district
- In office 1947–1949
- Succeeded by: Don Magnuson

Personal details
- Born: Albert Franklyn Canwell; January 11, 1907 Spokane, Washington, USA
- Died: April 1, 2002 (aged 95) Spokane, Washington, USA
- Party: Republican
- Occupation: journalist, state representative, professional anti-communist
- Known for: Canwell Committee

Albert Franklyn Canwell (January 11, 1907 – April 1, 2002) was an American journalist and politician who served as a member of the Washington State legislature from 1947 to 1949. He is best remembered as the namesake of the Washington legislature's Canwell Committee to investigate communist influence in Washington state, patterned after the House Committee on Un-American Activities (HUAC) of the United States Congress.

== Background ==
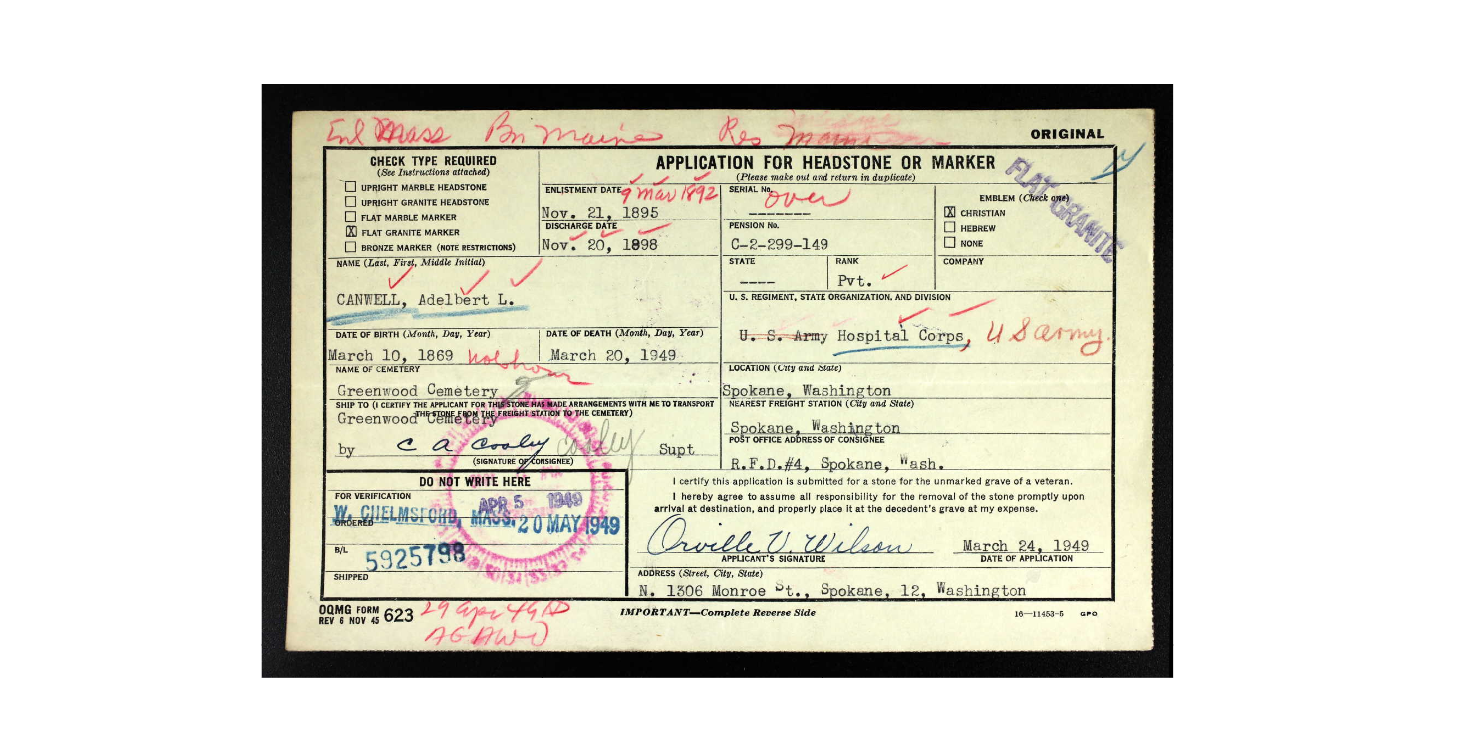
Al's father, Adelbert Lee Canwell, served in the Spanish–American War.

Albert Franklyn Canwell, known as "Al" to his friends, was born January 11, 1907, in Spokane, Washington.

His paternal grandfather, James Canwell (1840-1876), was a farmer from the New England state of Maine who served on the Union side in the American Civil War in the 1st Maine Cavalry before being taken as a prisoner-of-war. His father also served in the U.S. Cavalry as a member of the 1st Cavalry Regiment and later of the 4th Cavalry Regiment, and served in the Spanish–American War as a private in the United States Army. He served at various cavalry forts in the Arizona Territory and Territory of Alaska as well as at Fort Walla Walla in Washington state.

His father mustered out of the cavalry in 1900 and with his wife, Ingeborg Christina Espelund Canwell (1876-1967), the Norwegian daughter of immigrants to the United States, decided to settle in a rural part of Eastern Washington near the city of Spokane. The Canwell Glacier in Alaska is named for his father.

Due to their physical distance from the facility Canwell was held out of the local one-room school until the age of 8, being taught to read and write at home under the tutelage of his mother. The family moved to Spokane in 1916, where his father would ultimately become a member of the Teamster's Union. Albert passed the years of World War I as a schoolboy in various public schools of the city.

== Career ==
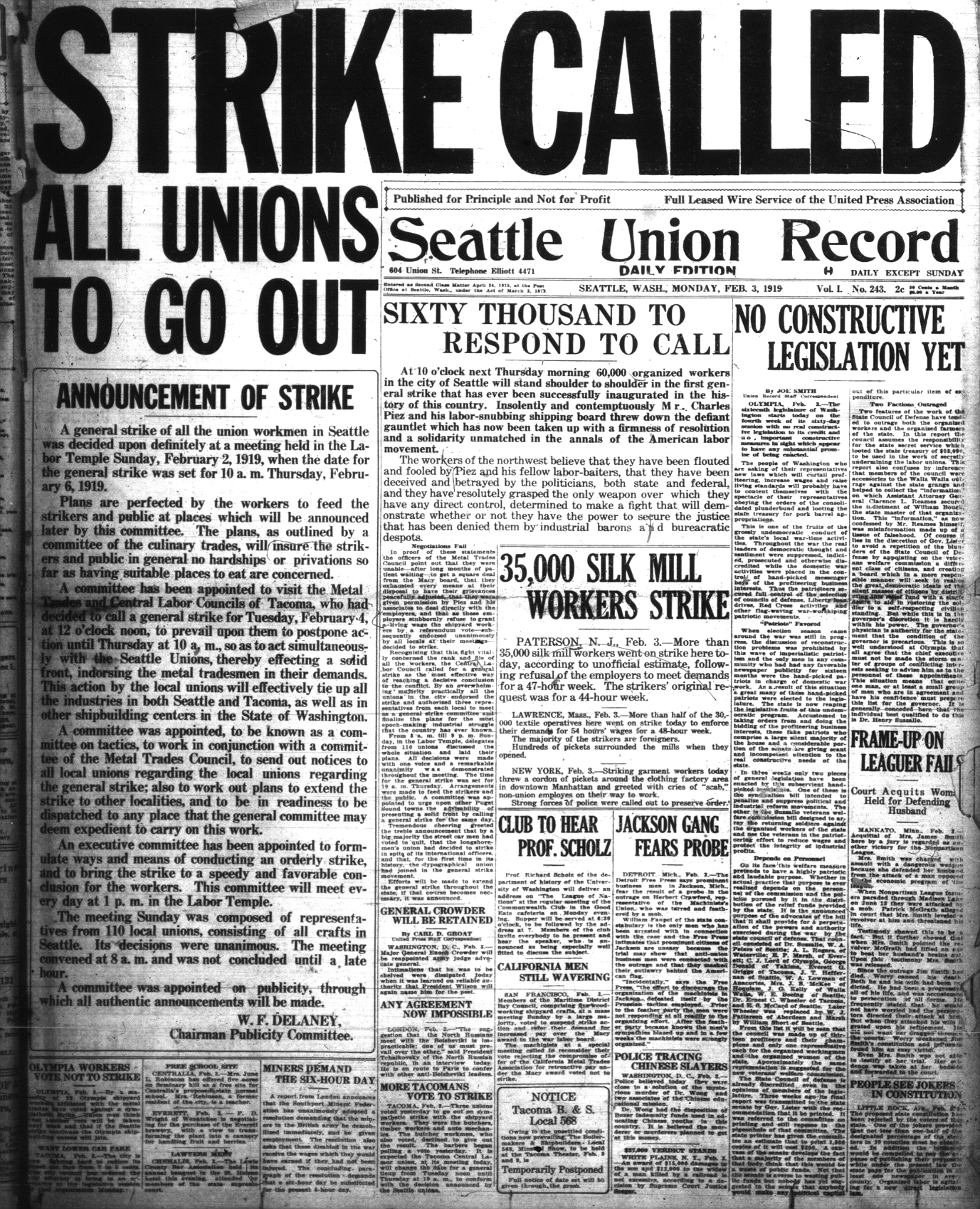
The Seattle General Strike of 1919 shook up the rather progressive Seattle area (here, cover of the Union Record for Monday, February 3, 1919)

In the years after the war, the young Canwell took time off school to work as an itinerant fruit picker, earning money and traveling to see the states of the Pacific coast. He also worked briefly as an assistant to an explosives specialist in the construction of a dam on the Hood River. He would continue traveling seasonally, working somewhat more lucratively as a fruit and produce packager until 1928 — a trade which included short stints riding freight trains and staying for a day or two in hobo camps.

It was in this period that Canwell was first exposed to radical industrial unionism in the form of the Industrial Workers of the World (IWW), commonly known as "Wobblies." Canwell later recalled:

The Wobbly organization or IWW was very, very prominent and very active. In general they were not a very desirable lot. I remember one incident. I was coming home from the Kennewick area. I had worked down there and ended up with a little money — not very much — and decided to ride a freight train back to Spokane. I boarded a flatcar and somewhere along the line a couple of fellows were working the train. You either had to have a Wobbly card or get off the train. That's cold turkey — supposed to pay a dollar for a red card, and that wasn't the sort of think I was likely to do. In Kennewick, I had bought a regular horse pistol. It was a .45 Colt; badly worn and dangerous to shoot, but I bought it for five dollars and I had this. When I was confronted with 'Either pay for this red ticket or get off the train!' I decided that wasn't the way it would be and I displayed this firearm that should have had wheels on it. Anyway, these two guys just took off, jumped off the train into the sagebrush head-over-heels. That's all I saw of them. That was one of my experiences with labor organizing.

After 1928, Canwell left produce packing for good, taking a job as an employee of a large Spokane bookstore for two years before going to work for the Seventh-day Adventist Church in Montana selling books door-to-door. In 1932 Canwell moved to Yakima and later to Ellensburg, where he worked for a regional advertising newspaper and in job printing. He soon made his way to Western Washington, settling in the Seattle area, where he made important contacts with the publisher of the Seattle Star and the Seattle Post-Intelligencer.

Canwell became a general assignment news reporter for International News Service (INS), for whom he covered such fare as ongoing labor disputes in the Detroit auto industry and the 1933 Chicago World's Fair. He continued to maintain a home base in Yakima throughout this period.

In covering the sometimes sensational labor strife in the Upper Midwest during the Great Depression era, Canwell again came face to face with radical labor organizers, this time in the orbit of the Communist Party, USA. In the process of interviewing auto workers, Canwell began to observe what he believed was dissonance between the actual perspective of rank-and-file workers, who in general did not express "any resistance to management that had substance" and the agenda of the union leadership. Canwell felt that the turmoil was "created by professional radicals who were, in general, Communists and Communist-trained labor leaders." He later declared:

I don't think there would be any organized activity back here in the labor field in the way of strikes without the Communist experts working there. I remember discussing the thing with John L. Lewis...[and] he, among others, said that the ablest organizers and the ablest leadership in labor was provided by the Communist element; they specialized in it."

Canwell emerged as a dedicated conservative Republican, viewing the New Deal of President Franklin D. Roosevelt as "a socialist venture and a repudiation of our free-enterprise, capitalist system." He would remain a committed anti-communist for the rest of his life.

In 1938, Canwell returned to his native Spokane, motivated to do so by his friend Ashley Holden, political editor of the Spokane Spokesman-Review. In addition to his written journalism, Canwell began developing as a photo-journalist, taking numerous photographs of prominent people. He also began systematically collecting and organizing files of radical publications and maintaining research notes on leading participants in the radical movement.

In the early 1940s, Canwell worked as the chief of the Spokane County Identification Bureau, attached to the Spokane County Sheriff's Office, replacing an individual who had been called up for military service during World War II. He also simultaneously worked for one year with the Identification Office of the Federal Narcotics Bureau. Although he anticipated being drafted himself, Canwell was never called into military service during the war years.

With the end of the war Canwell left the employ of the Sheriff's Office and took up life as a small scale cattle rancher.

=== Washington House of Representatives ===
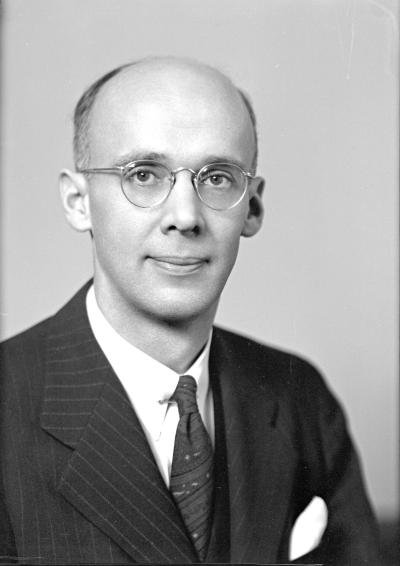
Washington House Speaker Herbert M. Hamblen (1947) appointed Canwell as Canwell Committee chair

Canwell was elected to the Washington state House of Representatives in November 1946. He made two primary promises to the voters of his Spokane district during the 1946 campaign — to oppose new taxes and to take action against the spread of Communism in America. In an effort to fulfill this campaign promise, Canwell actively participated in helping to write the House resolution which established a Washington State legislative committee to investigate the activities of the Communist Party USA in the state.

=== Canwell committee ===
On March 8, 1947, the legislature's House Concurrent Resolution No. 10 established a Joint Legislative Fact-Finding Committee on Un-American Activities. Speaker of the House Herbert M. Hamblen — also hailing from the Eastern Washington city of Spokane — tapped Canwell as the chairman of this interim committee. The committee consisted of 5 Republicans and 2 Democrats. The committee consequently became known as the Canwell Committee among the public and in the press.

The committee was funded by the private donation of Fritz Jewitt, a wealthy lumberman and conservative political activist.

The Canwell Committee met for the first time on January 27, 1948, at the Seattle Armory.

Canwell's national supporter was China Lobby leader Alfred Kohlberg of New York City. "We had become, I’d say, good friends or people who respected each other, as the years progressed."

=== Subsequent political career ===
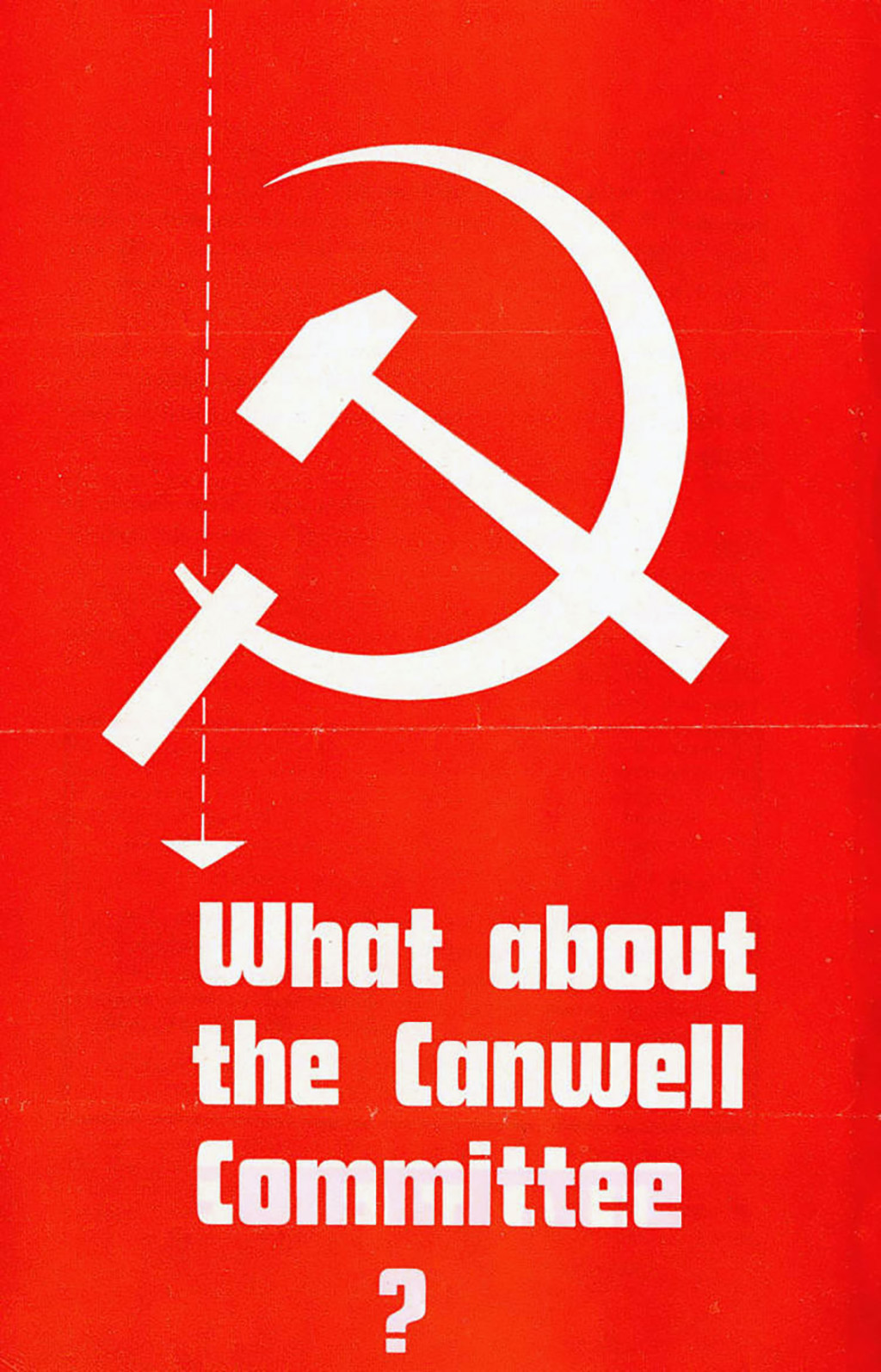
Cover of a pamphlet for Canwell's State Senate campaign, 1948

In the election of 1948 Canwell attempted to move from the House to the State Senate, running as the Republican nominee in the November general election. He was defeated in that bid.

Not deterred by his 1948 loss, Canwell ran for the United States Senate in 1950, but fell to defeat in the Republican primary.

In 1952, Washington was awarded another seat in Congress as a result of the census of 1950 and Canwell ran for the new at-large seat. Although he emerged victorious in the Republican primary, he was defeated by Democrat Don Magnuson in the November general election.

=== American Intelligence Service ===
Following his electoral defeat Canwell launched a business called the American Intelligence Service from a downtown Spokane office. In this capacity he published an anti-communist newsletter called The Vigilante.

== Death ==
Canwell died age 95 on April 1, 2002, at his home on the Little Spokane River.

== See also ==
- Canwell Committee
- Washington House of Representatives
- Anti-Communism
- Alfred Kohlberg
