= 2006 Washington House of Representatives election =

Washington State House elections, 2006
- November 7, 2006

98 seats of the Washington State House of Representatives 50 seats needed for a majority
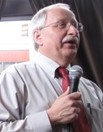

	Majority party	Minority party
Leader	Frank Chopp	Richard DeBolt
Party	Democratic	Republican
Leader's seat	43rd-Seattle	20th-Centralia
Last election	55	43
Seats before	56	42
Seats won	62	36
Seat change	▲6	▼6
Popular vote	2,075,413	1,646,030
Percentage	55.74%	44.21%
- Results: Democratic gain Democratic hold Republican hold
House Speaker before election
Frank Chopp
Democratic
Elected House Speaker
Frank Chopp
Democratic

The 2006 Washington State House elections took place on November 7, 2006. Voters in all 49 of Washington's legislative districts voted for their representatives. Washington State Senate elections were also held on November 7.

== Overview ==
Washington State House elections, 2006
Party	Votes	Percentage	Seats	+/–
Democratic	2,075,413	55.74%	63	▲6
Republican	1,646,030	44.21%	35	▼6
Progressive Party	2,081	0.06%	—	—
Totals	5,311,847	100.00%	98	—

== Predictions ==
Source	Ranking	As of
Rothenberg	Lean D	November 4, 2006

== Election results ==
=== District 1 ===
Washington's 1st legislative district House 1 election, 2006
Party	Candidate	Votes	%
Democratic	Al O'Brien	32,274	100
Total votes		32,274	100.00

Washington's 1st legislative district House 2 election, 2006
Party	Candidate	Votes	%
Democratic	Mark Ericks	25,739	61.90
Republican	Mark Davies	15,843	38.10
Total votes			100.00

=== District 2 ===
Washington's 2nd legislative district House 1 election, 2006
Party	Candidate	Votes	%
Democratic	Jean Marie Christenson	16,997	43.47
Republican	Jim McCune	22,107	56.53
Total votes			100.00

Washington's 2nd legislative district House 2 election, 2006
Party	Candidate	Votes	%
Democratic	Jeff Stephan	15,734	40.39
Republican	Tom Campbell	23,221	59.61
Total votes			100.00

=== District 3 ===
In 2004, Alex Wood was challenged by David Stevens and won with 61.61% of the vote.

Washington's 3rd legislative district House 1 election, 2006
Party	Candidate	Votes	%
Democratic	Alex Wood	19,801	67.31
Republican	Laura D. Carder	9,618	32.69
Total votes		29,419	100.00

Washington's 3rd legislative district House 2 election, 2006
Party	Candidate	Votes	%
Democratic	Timm Ormsby	23,682	100.00
Total votes		23,682	100.00

=== District 4 ===
Seat 1

- Larry Crouse (R) - Incumbent

In 2004, Larry Crouse was challenged by Jim Peck (D) and won with 61.55% of the vote.

Seat 2

- Lynn Schindler (R) - Incumbent
- Ed Foote (D) - Challenger

In 2004, Lynn Schindler was challenged by Ed Foote (D) and won with 65.85% of the vote.

=== District 5 ===
Seat 1

- Jay Rodne (R)

In 2004, Jay Rodne was challenged by Jeff Griffin (D) and Keith Kemp (L) and won with 52.36% of the vote.

Seat 2

- Glenn Anderson (R)

In 2004, Glenn Anderson was challenged by Barbara de Michele (D) and Beau Gunderson (L) and won with 54.07% of the vote.

=== District 6 ===
Seat 1

- John W. Serben (R) - Incumbent
- Donald A. Barlow (D) (WINNER)
  - Website: https://web.archive.org/web/20060827122542/http://www.electdonbarlow.com/
  - Info: Spokane Spokesman Review

In 2004, John Serben ran against Don Barlow (D) for an open seat (vacated when Brad Benson ran for State Senate) and won with 51.90% of the vote.

Seat 2

- John Ahern (R) - Incumbent (WINNER)
- Barbara Lampert (D)

In 2004, John Ahern was challenged by Douglas Dobbins (D) and won with 60.56% of the vote.

=== District 7 ===
Seat 1

- Bob Sump (R) - Incumbent
- Jack Miller (D) - Challenger
  - Website: https://web.archive.org/web/20060525060604/http://www.electjackmiller.com/

In 2004, Bob Sump was challenged by Jack Miller (D) and Dave Wordinger (L) and won with 64.12% of the vote.

Seat 2

Joel Kretz (R) - Incumbent

In 2004, Joel Kretz ran against Yvette Joseph (D) for an open seat (vacated when Cathy McMorris ran for Congress) and won with 65.15% of the vote.

=== District 8 ===
Seat 1

- Shirley Hankins (R) - Incumbent

In 2004, Shirley Hankins was challenged by Rick Dillender (D) and won with 73.28% of the vote.

Seat 2

- Larry Haler (R) - Incumbent
  - Website: http://www.larryhaler.com

In 2004, Larry Haler was challenged by Jerad Koepp (D) and won with 69.82% of the vote.

=== District 9 ===
Seat 1

  - Steve Hailey (R)
  - Joe Schmick (R)
  - Glen R. Stockwell (R)
  - Tedd Nealey (R)
  - Caitlin Ross (D)

Current incumbent Don Cox (R) is not seeking re-election in 2006.

Seat 2

  - David W. Buri (R) - Incumbent

=== District 10 ===
Seat 1

- Christopher Strow (R)

Seat 2

- Barbara Bailey (R) - Incumbent
- Tim Knue (D) - Challenger

=== District 11 ===
Position 1

- Zack Hudgins (D) - Incumbent

Position 2

- Bob Hasegawa (D) - Incumbent
- John Potter (R)

=== District 12 ===
Position 1

- Cary Condotta (R) - Incumbent

Position 2

- Mike Armstrong (R) - Incumbent

=== District 13 ===
Position 1

- Judith (Judy) Warnick (R)
- Max Golladay (R)

Current incumbent Janéa Holmquist (R) is running for State Senator.

Position 2

- Bill Hinkle (R) - Incumbent

=== District 14 ===
Position 1

- Mary Skinner (R) - Incumbent
- Don Hinman (D)

Position 2

- Ron Bonlender (D)
- Sandra Belzer Swanson (R)
- James Keightley (R)
- Harold F. Koempel (R)
- Charles R. Ross (R)
- Glen Blomgren (R)

Current Incumbent James Clements (R) is not seeking re-election in 2006.

=== District 15 ===
Position 1

- Bruce Chandler (R) - Incumbent
- Glen Howard Pinkham (D)

Position 2

- Dan Newhouse (R) - Incumbent
- William J. Yallup (D)

=== District 16 ===
Position 1

- Maureen Walsh (R) - Incumbent
- Patrick Guettner (R)
- George Fearing (D)

Position 2

- Bill Grant (D) - Incumbent
- Sheryl Cox (R)
- Kevin Young (R)

=== District 17 ===
Seat 1

- Jim Dunn (R) - Incumbent
- Pat Campbell (D) - Challenger
- Jack Burkman (D) - Challenger

Seat 2

- Deb Wallace (D) - Incumbent
- Paul Harris (R) - Challenger

=== District 18 ===
Position 1

- Richard Curtis (R) - Incumbent
- Jonathan Fant (D)

Position 2

- Ed Orcutt (R) - Incumbent
- Julie McCord (D)

=== District 19 ===
Position 1

- Dean Takko (D) - Incumbent
- Tim Sutinen (R) - Challenger

Position 2

- Brian Blake (D) - Incumbent
- Keath Huff (R) - Challenger

=== District 20 ===
Position 1

- Richard DeBolt (R) - Incumbent, House Minority Leader
- Mike Rechner (D)

Position 2

- Gary C. Alexander (R) - Incumbent

=== District 21 ===
Position 1

- Mary Helen Roberts (D) - Incumbent

Position 2

- Brian Sullivan (D) - Incumbent

=== District 22 ===
Seat 1

- Brendan W. Williams (D) - Incumbent

Seat 2

- Sam Hunt (D) - Incumbent
- Kevin Bonagofski (R)

=== District 23 ===
Position 1

- Sherry Appleton (D) - Incumbent
- Earl Johnson (R)

Position 2

- Beverly Woods (R) - Incumbent
- Christine Rolfes (D)

=== District 24 ===
Seat 1

- James Buck (R) - Incumbent
- Kevin Van de Wege (D) - Challenger

James Buck was challenged by Van de Wege in 2002, and won with 51%.

Seat 2

- Lynn Kessler (D) - Incumbent, House Majority Leader

=== District 25 ===
Position 1

- Joyce McDonald (R) - Incumbent
- Jonathan E. Bristol - (D)

Position 2

- Dawn Morrell (D) - Incumbent
- Wally Nash (R)

=== District 26 ===
Seat 1

- Patricia Lantz (D) - Incumbent
- Beckie Krantz (R) - Challenger

Seat 2

- Larry Seaquist (D)
- Ronald Boehme (R)
- Trent England (R)

Current Seat 2 Representative Derek Kilmer (D) is running for the State Senate seat left open by the retirement of Bob Oke, which leaves the race for this seat an open race.

=== District 27 ===
Seat 1

- Dennis Flannigan (D) - Incumbent
- Stan Barker (politician) (R)

Seat 2

- Jeannie Darneille (D) - Incumbent
- Bret Edensword (R)

=== District 28 ===
Position 1

- Troy Kelley (D) (cw)
- Don Anderson (R) (cw)
- Stan Flemming (R)

Current incumbent Gigi Talcott (R) is not seeking re-election in 2006.

Position 2

- Tami Green (D) - Incumbent (cw)
- Bob Lawrence (R)
- Jim Oliver (R)

=== District 29 ===
Position 1

- Steve Conway (D) - Incumbent

Position 2

- Steve Kirby (D) - Incumbent

=== District 30 ===
Position 1

- Mark Miloscia (D) - Incumbent
- Anthony Kalchik (R)

Position 2

- Skip Priest (R) - Incumbent
- Helen Stanwell (D)

=== District 31 ===
Seat 1

- Dan Roach (R) - Incumbent
- Karen Willard (D) - Challenger

Seat 2

- Jan Shabro (R) - Incumbent
- Christopher Hurst (D) - Challenger and former House member

=== District 32 ===
Position 1

- Maralyn Chase (D) - Incumbent
- Norine Federow (R)

Position 2

- Ruth Kagi (D) - Incumbent
- Steve Gibbs (R)

=== District 33 ===
Position 1

- Shay Schual-Berke (D) - Incumbent
- Mike Cook (R)

Position 2

- Dave Upthegrove (D) - Incumbent

=== District 34 ===
Position 1

- Eileen L. Cody (D) - Incumbent

Position 2

- Joe McDermott (D) - Incumbent
- Savun Neang (R)

=== District 35 ===
Position 1

- Kathy Haigh (D) - Incumbent
- Marco Brown (R)

Position 2

- William 'IKE' Eickmeyer (D) - Incumbent
- Randy Neatherlin (R)

=== District 36 ===
Position 1

- Helen Sommers (D) - Incumbent

Position 2

- Mary Lou Dickerson (D) - Incumbent

=== District 37 ===
Position 1

- Sharon Tomiko Santos (D) - Incumbent

Position 2

- Eric Pettigrew (D) - Incumbent
- Kwame Wyking Garrett (R)

=== District 38 ===
Position 1

- John McCoy (D) - Incumbent
- Kim Halvorson (R)

Position 2

- Mike Sells (D) - Incumbent

=== District 39 ===
Seat 1

- Dan Kristiansen (R) - Incumbent
- Scott Olson (D) - Challenger

Seat 2

- Kirk Pearson (R) - Incumbent

=== District 40 ===
Position 1

- Dave Quall (D) - Incumbent
- Yoshe Revelle (R)

Position 2

- Jeff Morris (D) - Incumbent

=== District 41 ===
Position 1

- Fred Jarrett (R) - Incumbent
- Dale Murphy (D)

Position 2

- Judy Clibborn (D) - Incumbent
- Erik Fretheim (R)

=== District 42 ===
Seat 1

- Doug Ericksen (R) - Incumbent
  - Website: http://dougericksen.com/
- Jasper MacSlarrow (D) - Challenger
  - Website: http://www.votejasper.com/

Seat 2

- Kelli Linville (D) - Incumbent
- Craig Mayberry (R) - Challenger

=== District 43 ===
Seat 1

- Dick Kelley (D) Kelley in 2006
- Jamie Pedersen (D) People for Pedersen
- Bill Sherman (D) billsherman.com
- Stephanie Pure (D) People for Pure
- Jim Street (D) JimStreet.org
- Lynne Dodson (D) LynneToWin.org
- Hugh Foskett (R)
- Linde Knighton (Progressive) voteknighton.org

Ed Murray is stepping down from his House seat to run for the State Senate.

Rough road ahead for non-Democrat candidates in 43rd

Seat 2

- Frank Chopp (D) - Current Speaker of the House
- Will "Chopper" Sohn (R) Will Sohn For Representative

=== District 44 ===
Position 1

- Hans Dunshee (D) - Incumbent
- Mike Hope (R)

Position 2

- John Lovick (D) - Incumbent
- Robert Legg (R)

=== District 45 ===
Seat 1

- Roger Goodman (D)
- Jeffrey Possinger (R)
  - Current Rep. Toby Nixon (R) is running for the open Senate seat.

Seat 2

- Larry Springer (D) - Incumbent
- Tim Lee (R)

=== District 46 ===
Position 1

- Jim McIntire (D) - Incumbent
  - Website: https://web.archive.org/web/20060829232052/http://jimmcintire.com/

Position 2

- Phyllis Gutierrez Kenney (D) - Incumbent
  - Website:

=== District 47 ===
Seat 1

- Geoff Simpson (D) - Incumbent
  - Website: http://www.votesimpson.com/
- Donna Watts (R)
  - Website: https://web.archive.org/web/20070502190510/http://www.donnawatts.org/

Seat 2

- Pat Sullivan (D) - Incumbent
  - Website: http://www.votepatsullivan.com/
- Andrew Franz (R)
  - Website: https://web.archive.org/web/20061106034048/http://www.andrewfranz.org/

=== District 48 ===
Seat 1

- Ross Hunter (D) - Incumbent, Ross Hunter
- Nancy Potts (R) Nancy Potts

Seat 2

- Deb Eddy (D) Deb Eddy
- ~~Santiago Ramos (D) (cw)~~
- Brett Olson - (R) Bret Olson for 48th District Representative

Seat 2 became an open seat on March 14, 2006, when Rodney Tom announced his candidacy for the Senate, switching parties from Republican to Democrat in the process.

=== District 49 ===
Washington's 49th legislative district House 1 election, 2006
Party	Candidate	Votes	%
Democratic	Charles Fromhold	21,735	64.68
Republican	Nancy De Leo	11,867	35.32
Total votes		33,602	100.00

Washington's 49th legislative district House 2 election, 2006
Party	Candidate	Votes	%
Democratic	James Moeller	20,630	61.36
Republican	Sharon Long	12,989	38.64
Total votes		33,619	100.00
