= 2008 Washington State Senate election =

Washington State Senate elections, 2008
- November 4, 2008

25 seats of the Washington State Senate 25 seats needed for a majority
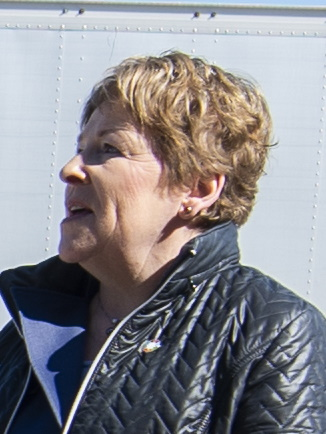

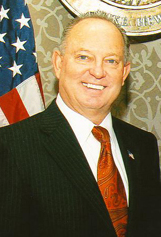
	Majority party	Minority party
Leader	Lisa Brown	Mike Hewitt
Party	Democratic	Republican
Leader's seat	3rd-Spokane	16th-Walla Walla
Last election	32	17
Seats won	31	18
Seat change	▼1	▲1
- Results: Republican gain Democratic hold Republican hold No election
Majority Leader before election
Lisa Brown
Democratic
Elected Majority Leader
Lisa Brown
Democratic

Voters in 26 of Washington's 49 legislative districts voted for their state senators in the 2008 Washington State Senate elections on November 4, 2008. All vote totals are from the Washington Secretary of State's website.

25 seats were regularly scheduled to be up this cycle, along with 1 additional seat holding a special election to fill an unexpired term: the 34th district, held by appointed Senator Joe McDermott, whose former incumbent Erik Poulsen vacated the seat.

== Overview ==
Washington State Senate elections, 2008
Party	Votes	Percentage	Seats	+/–
Democratic	774,925	54.15%	31	-1
Republican	645,664	45.11%	18	+1
Independent	10,598	0.74%		
Invalid or blank votes			—	—
Totals	1,431,187	100.00%	49	—

Pre-election	Seats
Democratic-Held	32
Republican-Held	17

Elections	Seats
Democratic Incumbent and Uncontested	2
Races w/ two Democrats in General	2
Republican Incumbent and Uncontested	4
Races w/ two Republicans in General	0
Contested, Open Seats	

Post-election	Seats
Democratic-Held	31
Republican-Held	18
Total	49

== Predictions ==
Source	Ranking	As of
Stateline	Safe D	October 15, 2008

== Seats up for election ==
These are the final, official results as taken from the website of the Secretary of State of Washington.

=== District 1 ===
Washington's 1st legislative district election, 2008
Party	Candidate	Votes	%
Democratic	Rosemary McAuliffe Campaign website	36,628	57.95
Republican	Dennis Richter Campaign website	26,583	42.05
Invalid or blank votes			
Total votes		63,211	100.00
Turnout			
Democratic hold			

=== District 2 ===
Washington's 2nd legislative district election, 2008
Party	Candidate	Votes	%
Democratic	Marilyn Rasmussen Campaign website	30,206	48.37
Republican	Randi Becker Campaign website	32,244	51.63%
Invalid or blank votes			
Total votes		62,450	100.00
Turnout			
Republican gain from Democratic			

=== District 3 ===
Washington's 3rd legislative district election, 2008
Party	Candidate	Votes	%
Democratic	Lisa Brown	30,893	74.46
Independent	John Moyna Campaign website	10,598	25.54
Invalid or blank votes			
Total votes		41,491	100.00
Turnout			
Democratic hold			

=== District 4 ===
Washington's 4th legislative district election, 2008
Party	Candidate	Votes	%
Republican	Bob McCaslin, Sr.	36,745	57.5
Democratic	Judi Owens Campaign website	27,163	42.5
Invalid or blank votes			
Total votes		63,908	100.00
Turnout			
Republican hold			

=== District 5 ===
Washington's 5th legislative district election, 2008
Party	Candidate	Votes	%
Republican	Cheryl Pflug Campaign website	43,178	59.95
Democratic	Phyllis Huster Campaign website	28,851	40.05
Invalid or blank votes			
Total votes		72,029	100.00
Turnout			
Republican hold			

=== District 9 ===
Washington's 9th legislative district election, 2008
Party	Candidate	Votes	%
Republican	Mark G. Schoesler	41,263	100.00
Invalid or blank votes			
Total votes		41,263	100.00
Turnout			
Republican hold			

=== District 10 ===
Washington's 10th legislative district election, 2008
Party	Candidate	Votes	%
Democratic	Mary Margaret Haugen Campaign website	36,835	53.58
Republican	Linda Haddon Campaign website	31,917	46.42
Invalid or blank votes			
Total votes		68,752	100.00
Turnout			
Democratic hold			

=== District 11 ===
Washington's 11th legislative district election, 2008
Party	Candidate	Votes	%
Democratic	Margarita Prentice Campaign website	25,817	68.25
Democratic	Juan Martinez Campaign website	12,011	31.75
Invalid or blank votes			
Total votes		37,828	100.00
Turnout			
Democratic hold			

=== District 12 ===
Washington's 12th legislative district election, 2008
Party	Candidate	Votes	%
Republican	Linda Evans Parlette	43,993	100.00
Invalid or blank votes			
Total votes		43,993	100.00
Turnout			
Republican hold			

=== District 14 ===
Washington's 14th legislative district election, 2008
Party	Candidate	Votes	%
Republican	Curtis King Campaign website	36,984	100.00
Invalid or blank votes			
Total votes		36,984	100.00
Turnout			
Republican hold			

=== District 16 ===
Washington's 16th legislative district election, 2008
Party	Candidate	Votes	%
Republican	Mike Hewitt Campaign website	42,811	100.00
Invalid or blank votes			
Total votes		42,811	100.00
Turnout			
Republican hold			

=== District 17 ===
Washington's 17th legislative district election, 2008
Party	Candidate	Votes	%
Republican	Don Benton Campaign website	29,426	51.14
Democratic	David Carrier Campaign website	28,111	48.86
Invalid or blank votes			
Total votes		57,537	100.00
Turnout			
Republican hold			

=== District 18 ===
Washington's 18th legislative district election, 2008
Party	Candidate	Votes	%
Republican	Joseph Zarelli	39,311	55.03
Democratic	Jon Haugen Campaign website	32,127	44.97
Invalid or blank votes			
Total votes		71,438	100.00
Turnout			
Republican hold			

=== District 19 ===
Washington's 19th legislative district election, 2008
Party	Candidate	Votes	%
Democratic	Brian Hatfield	41,073	100.00
Invalid or blank votes			
Total votes		41,073	100.00
Turnout			
Democratic hold			

=== District 20 ===
Washington's 20th legislative district election, 2008
Party	Candidate	Votes	%
Republican	Dan Swecker Campaign website	39,650	63.87
Democratic	Chuck Bojarski	22,428	36.13
Invalid or blank votes			
Total votes		62,078	100.00
Turnout			
Republican hold			

=== District 22 ===
Washington's 22nd legislative district election, 2008
Party	Candidate	Votes	%
Democratic	Karen Fraser	45,062	73.48
Democratic	Erik Lee	16,266	26.52
Invalid or blank votes			
Total votes		61,328	100.00
Turnout			
Democratic hold			

=== District 23 ===
Washington's 23rd legislative district election, 2008
Party	Candidate	Votes	%
Democratic	Phil Rockefeller Campaign website	40,128	61.9
Republican	Connie Lord Campaign website	24,701	38.1
Invalid or blank votes			
Total votes		64,829	100.00
Turnout			
Democratic hold			

=== District 24 ===
Washington's 24th legislative district election, 2008
Party	Candidate	Votes	%
Democratic	Jim Hargrove	52,742	100.00
Invalid or blank votes			
Total votes		52,742	100.00
Turnout			
Democratic hold			

=== District 25 ===
Washington's 25th legislative district election, 2008
Party	Candidate	Votes	%
Democratic	Jim Kastama Campaign website	32,988	56.56
Republican	Michele Smith	25,338	43.44
Invalid or blank votes			
Total votes		58,326	100.00
Turnout			
Democratic hold			

=== District 27 ===
Washington's 27th legislative district election, 2008
Party	Candidate	Votes	%
Democratic	Debbie Regala	31,988	67.18
Republican	Larry Faulk	15,625	32.82
Invalid or blank votes			
Total votes		47,613	100.00
Turnout			
Democratic hold			

=== District 28 ===
Washington's 28th legislative district election, 2008
Party	Candidate	Votes	%
Republican	Mike Carrell	27,628	56.07
Democratic	Debi Srail Campaign website	21,644	43.93
Invalid or blank votes			
Total votes		49,272	100.00
Turnout			
Republican hold			

=== District 34 (special election) ===
Washington's 34th legislative district election, 2008
Party	Candidate	Votes	%
Democratic	Joe McDermott	49,203	100.00
Invalid or blank votes			
Total votes		49,203	100.00
Turnout			
Democratic hold			

=== District 39 ===
Washington's 39th legislative district election, 2008
Party	Candidate	Votes	%
Republican	Val Stevens Campaign website	36,118	58.55
Democratic	Fred Walser Campaign website	25,570	41.45
Invalid or blank votes			
Total votes		61,688	100.00
Turnout			
Republican hold			

=== District 40 ===
Washington's 40th legislative district election, 2008
Party	Candidate	Votes	%
Republican	Steve Van Luven Campaign website	27,028	41.44
Democratic	Kevin Ranker Campaign website	38,200	58.56
Invalid or blank votes			
Total votes		65,228	100.00
Turnout			
Democratic hold			

=== District 41 ===
Representative Fred Jarrett switched to the Democratic Party.

Washington's 41st legislative district election, 2008
Party	Candidate	Votes	%
Democratic	Fred Jarrett Campaign website	38,327	59.5
Republican	Bob Baker Campaign website	26,092	40.05
Invalid or blank votes			
Total votes		64,419	100.00
Turnout			
Democratic hold			

=== District 49 ===
Washington's 49th legislative district election, 2008
Party	Candidate	Votes	%
Democratic	Craig Pridemore Campaign website	30,664	61.71
Republican	Tom Langston Campaign website	19,029	38.29
Invalid or blank votes			
Total votes		49,693	100.00
Turnout			
Democratic hold			
