= List of Washington state legislatures =

List of legislative terms of the Washington State Legislature in the US

The legislature of the U.S. state of Washington has convened many times since statehood became effective on November 11, 1889.

== Legislatures ==
| Number | Start date | End date | Election | | Significant legislation |
| Number | Start date | End date | House | Senate | Significant legislation |
|---|---|---|---|---|---|
| 1st Washington State Legislature | 1889 | 1890 | | | |
| 2nd Washington State Legislature | 1891 | 1891 | | | |
| 3rd Washington State Legislature | 1893 | 1893 | | | |
| 4th Washington State Legislature | 1895 | 1895 | | | |
| 5th Washington State Legislature | 1897 | 1897 | | | |
| 6th Washington State Legislature | 1899 | 1899 | | | |
| 7th Washington State Legislature | 1901 | 1901 | | | |
| 8th Washington State Legislature | 1903 | 1903 | | | |
| 9th Washington State Legislature | 1905 | 1905 | | | |
| 10th Washington State Legislature | 1907 | 1907 | | | |
| 11th Washington State Legislature | 1909 | 1909 | | | |
| 12th Washington State Legislature | 1911 | 1911 | | | |
| 13th Washington State Legislature | 1913 | 1913 | | | |
| 14th Washington State Legislature | 1915 | 1915 | | | |
| 15th Washington State Legislature | 1917 | 1917 | | | |
| 16th Washington State Legislature | 1919 | 1920 | | | |
| 17th Washington State Legislature | 1921 | 1921 | | | |
| 18th Washington State Legislature | 1923 | 1923 | | | |
| 19th Washington State Legislature | 1925 | 1925 | | | |
| 20th Washington State Legislature | 1927 | 1927 | | | |
| 21st Washington State Legislature | 1929 | 1929 | | | |
| 22nd Washington State Legislature | 1931 | 1931 | | | |
| 23rd Washington State Legislature | 1933 | 1933 | | | |
| 24th Washington State Legislature | 1935 | 1935 | | | |
| 25th Washington State Legislature | 1937 | 1937 | | | |
| 26th Washington State Legislature | 1939 | 1939 | | | |
| 27th Washington State Legislature | 1941 | 1941 | | | |
| 28th Washington State Legislature | 1943 | 1944 | | | |
| 29th Washington State Legislature | 1945 | 1945 | | | |
| 30th Washington State Legislature | 1947 | 1947 | | | |
| 31st Washington State Legislature | 1949 | 1950 | | | |
| 32nd Washington State Legislature | 1951 | 1951 | | | |
| 33rd Washington State Legislature | 1953 | 1953 | | | |
| 34th Washington State Legislature | 1955 | 1955 | | | |
| 35th Washington State Legislature | 1957 | 1957 | | | |
| 36th Washington State Legislature | 1959 | 1959 | | | |
| 37th Washington State Legislature | 1961 | 1961 | | | |
| 38th Washington State Legislature | 1963 | 1963 | | | |
| 39th Washington State Legislature | 1965 | 1965 | | | |
| 40th Washington State Legislature | 1967 | 1967 | | | |
| 41st Washington State Legislature | 1969 | 1970 | | | |
| 42nd Washington State Legislature | 1971 | 1972 | | | |
| 43rd Washington State Legislature | 1973 | 1974 | | | |
| 44th Washington State Legislature | 1975 | 1976 | | | |
| 45th Washington State Legislature | 1977 | 1977 | | | |
| 46th Washington State Legislature | 1979 | 1980 | | | |
| 47th Washington State Legislature | 1981 | 1982 | | | |
| 48th Washington State Legislature | 1983 | 1984 | | | |
| 49th Washington State Legislature | 1985 | 1986 | | | |
| 50th Washington State Legislature | 1987 | 1988 | | | |
| 51st Washington State Legislature | 1989 | 1990 | | | |
| 52nd Washington State Legislature | 1991 | 1992 | | | |
| 53rd Washington State Legislature | 1993 | 1994 | | | |
| 54th Washington State Legislature | 1995 | 1996 | | | |
| 55th Washington State Legislature | 1997 | 1998 | | | |
| 56th Washington State Legislature | 1999 | 2000 | | | |
| 57th Washington State Legislature | 2001 | 2002 | | | |
| 58th Washington State Legislature | 2003 | 2004 | | | |
| 59th Washington State Legislature | 2005 | 2006 | | 2004 Senate | HB 2661 (LGBT rights) |
| 60th Washington State Legislature | 2007 | 2008 | House, | Senate | |
| 61st Washington State Legislature | 2009 | 2010 | House, | Senate | |
| 62nd Washington State Legislature | 2011 | 2012 | House, | 2010 Senate | |
| 63rd Washington State Legislature | 2013 | 2014 | House, | 2012 Senate | |
| 64th Washington State Legislature | 2015 | 2016 | House, | 2014 Senate | |
| 65th Washington State Legislature | 2017 | 2018 | 2016 House | 2016 Senate | Public Records Act: A proposed revision would have exempted communication of the legislature. Passed with supermajorities in both houses, but was vetoed by Governor Inslee. Lawmakers chose not to override the veto due to public outcry. Washington Voting Rights Act |
| 66th Washington State Legislature | 2019 | 2020 | House, | 2018 Senate | |
| 67th Washington State Legislature | 2021 | 2022 | House, | 2020 Senate | |
| 68th Washington State Legislature | 2023 | 2024 | 2022 House | 2022 Senate | Climate Commitment Act |
| 69th Washington State Legislature | 2025 | 2026 | 2024 House | 2024 Senate | |

== See also ==
- Washington legislative districts
- List of governors of Washington
- Constitution of Washington
- Politics of Washington (state)
- Elections in Washington (state)
- Washington State Capitol
- Timeline of Washington (state) history
- Lists of United States state legislative sessions
- E. R. Pickrell
