= Don Carlson (politician) =

American politician from Washington

Member of the Washington Senate from the 49th district
- In office January 8, 2001 – January 10, 2005
- Preceded by: Albert Bauer
- Succeeded by: Craig Pridemore

Member of the Washington House of Representatives from the 49th district
- In office January 11, 1993 – January 8, 2001
- Preceded by: Joseph E. King
- Succeeded by: Bill Fromhold

Personal details
- Born: December 30, 1938 (age 87) Aberdeen, Washington, U.S.
- Party: Republican
- Spouse: Jan Carlson
- Children: 2
- Education: Western Washington University (BA, MA)

Don M. Carlson (born December 30, 1938) is an American educator and politician who served in the Washington House of Representatives from the 49th district from 1993 to 2001 and in the Washington State Senate from the 49th district from 2001 to 2005. Carlson, a Republican, lost his seat to Democrat Craig Pridemore in the 2004 election.
