= Joseph E. King =

American politician (born 1945)

43rd Speaker of the Washington House of Representatives
- In office January 12, 1987 – January 11, 1993
- Preceded by: Wayne Ehlers
- Succeeded by: Brian Ebersole

Majority Leader of the Washington House of Representatives
- In office January 14, 1985 – January 12, 1987
- Preceded by: Denny Heck
- Succeeded by: Pat McMullen

Member of the Washington House of Representatives from the 49th district
- In office January 12, 1981 – January 11, 1993
- Preceded by: Albert Bauer
- Succeeded by: Don Carlson

Personal details
- Born: September 2, 1945 (age 80) Texas, U.S.
- Party: Democratic

Joseph E. King (born September 2, 1945) is an American politician in the state of Washington. He served in the Washington House of Representatives from 1981 to 1993. He was Speaker of the House from 1987 to 1993. He sought the Democratic nomination for the 1992 Washington gubernatorial election, but was defeated by Mike Lowry.
