= Jim Jacks =

American politician

Member of the Washington House of Representatives from the 49th district
- In office January 12, 2009 – March 25, 2011
- Preceded by: Bill Fromhold
- Succeeded by: Sharon Wylie

Personal details
- Born: James F. Jacks II; January 21, 1970 (age 56)
- Party: Democratic
- Spouse: Brenda L. Jacks
- Education: Oregon State University (BS); University of Bradford (MA)
- Profession: Victim-Offender Mediation; Public Advocate; Business development Project manager

James F. Jacks II (born January 21, 1970) is an American politician of the Democratic Party. He is a former member of the Washington House of Representatives, representing the 49th Legislative District.
