= Timeline of Washington =

Timeline of Washington may refer to:

- Timeline of Washington (state)
- Timeline of Washington, D.C.
