= Timeline of Washington history =

Timeline of Washington history may refer to:

- Timeline of Washington (state) history
- Timeline of Washington, D.C.
