= 1952 Washington gubernatorial election =

- November 4, 1952
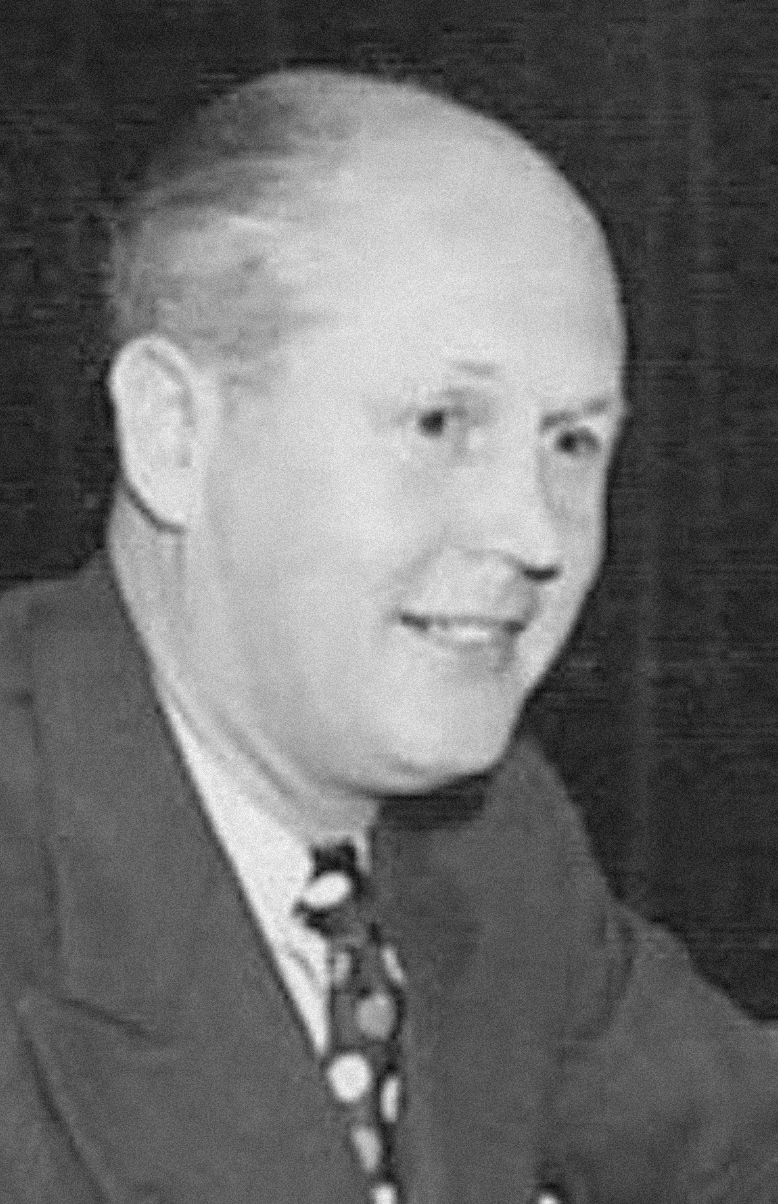

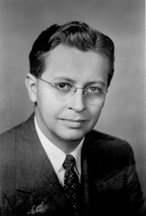
Nominee	Arthur B. Langlie	Hugh Mitchell
Party	Republican	Democratic
Popular vote	567,822	510,675
Percentage	52.65%	47.35%
- County results Langlie: 50–60% 60–70% Mitchell: 50–60%
Governor before election
Arthur B. Langlie
Republican
Elected Governor
Arthur B. Langlie
Republican

The 1952 Washington gubernatorial election took place on November 4, 1952, between incumbent governor Arthur B. Langlie of the Republican Party and U.S. Representative Hugh Mitchell of the Democratic Party. Langlie won the general election, becoming the first Washington state governor to be elected to a third term. This is most recent gubernatorial election in which a Republican carried Jefferson County.

== Primary election ==
Democratic U.S. Congressman Hugh Mitchell announced his candidacy for governor on March 22, seeking to fix an administration that was "falling apart at the seams". By May, Mitchell was joined by state senator Albert D. Rosellini of Seattle, State Treasurer Tom Martin, Speaker of the House Charles W. Hodde, and Charles C. Ralls in what The Seattle Times described as a "hard-to-predict contest" for the Democratic nomination. During various debates, Rosellini denounced Mitchell as a "left-winger", leaving doubts amidst the anti-communist wave of the era. Mitchell ultimately won the Democratic nomination by a margin of about 30,000 votes

Incumbent Governor Arthur B. Langlie, who had been elected to two non-consecutive terms in 1940 and 1948, filed his intention to run for a third term on July 17 after returning from the 1952 Republican National Convention. Dr. John E. Lydon, a Seattle sanipractor, was the only Republican to run against Langlie and was not considered a serious contender for the party nomination.

At the time, Washington used a blanket primary for nominations, with all candidates appearing on the same ballot with the highest candidate for each party being nominated.

=== Candidates ===
==== Republican Party ====
- Arthur B. Langlie, incumbent Governor
- John E. Lydon

==== Democratic Party ====
- Charles W. Hodde, Speaker of the State House
- Tom Martin, State Treasurer
- Hugh Mitchell, U.S. Representative from the 1st district, former U.S. Senator
- Charles C. Ralls
- Albert D. Rosellini, State Senator from South Seattle and Majority Leader in the State Senate

=== Results ===
Blanket primary results
Party	Candidate	Votes	%
Republican	Arthur B. Langlie (incumbent)	245,560	34.91%
Democratic	Hugh Mitchell	168,844	24.01%
Democratic	Albert D. Rosellini	137,889	19.60%
Democratic	Charles W. Hodde	59,688	8.49%
Democratic	Tom Martin	48,327	6.87%
Democratic	Charles C. Ralls	22,221	3.16%
Republican	John E. Lydon	20,830	2.96%
Total votes		703,359	100.00%

== General election ==
=== Results ===
1952 Washington gubernatorial election
Party	Candidate	Votes	%	±%
Republican	Arthur B. Langlie (incumbent)	567,822	52.65%	+2.15%
Democratic	Hugh Mitchell	510,675	47.35%	+0.13%
Majority		57,147	5.30%	
Total votes		1,078,497	100.00%	
Republican hold		Swing	+2.02%	

=== Results by county ===
County	Arthur B. Langlie Republican		Hugh Mitchell Democratic		Margin		Total votes cast
County	#	%	#	%	#	%	Total votes cast
Adams	2,157	67.47%	1,040	32.53%	1,117	34.94%	3,197
Asotin	2,248	48.34%	2,402	51.66%	-154	-3.31%	4,650
Benton	12,629	54.98%	10,343	45.02%	2,286	9.95%	22,972
Chelan	9,856	55.53%	7,893	44.47%	1,963	11.06%	17,749
Clallam	6,086	51.98%	5,622	48.02%	464	3.96%	11,708
Clark	19,069	52.45%	17,286	47.55%	1,783	4.90%	36,355
Columbia	1,311	58.97%	912	41.03%	399	17.95%	2,223
Cowlitz	11,547	49.35%	11,849	50.65%	-302	-1.29%	23,396
Douglas	2,616	49.87%	2,630	50.13%	-14	-0.27%	5,246
Ferry	624	44.60%	775	55.40%	-151	-10.79%	1,399
Franklin	2,964	49.30%	3,048	50.70%	-84	-1.40%	6,012
Garfield	1,070	63.16%	624	36.84%	446	26.33%	1,694
Grant	4,152	47.94%	4,509	52.06%	-357	-4.12%	8,661
Grays Harbor	11,207	46.71%	12,784	53.29%	-1,577	-6.57%	23,991
Island	2,879	61.71%	1,786	38.29%	1,093	23.43%	4,665
Jefferson	2,386	56.53%	1,835	43.47%	551	13.05%	4,221
King	197,830	54.60%	164,511	45.40%	33,319	9.20%	362,341
Kitsap	17,559	47.25%	19,606	52.75%	-2,047	-5.51%	37,165
Kittitas	4,792	53.49%	4,166	46.51%	626	6.99%	8,958
Klickitat	3,049	62.11%	1,860	37.89%	1,189	24.22%	4,909
Lewis	10,916	56.90%	8,267	43.10%	2,649	13.81%	19,183
Lincoln	3,372	64.27%	1,875	35.73%	1,497	28.53%	5,247
Mason	3,578	47.33%	3,982	52.67%	-404	-5.34%	7,560
Okanogan	5,570	52.12%	5,116	47.88%	454	4.25%	10,686
Pacific	3,709	49.93%	3,720	50.07%	-11	-0.15%	7,429
Pend Oreille	1,405	49.06%	1,459	50.94%	-54	-1.89%	2,864
Pierce	52,119	46.92%	58,958	53.08%	-6,839	-6.16%	111,077
San Juan	1,128	64.09%	632	35.91%	496	28.18%	1,760
Skagit	10,847	55.26%	8,782	44.74%	2,065	10.52%	19,629
Skamania	980	49.77%	989	50.23%	-9	-0.46%	1,969
Snohomish	25,509	46.54%	29,301	53.46%	-3,792	-6.92%	54,810
Spokane	49,985	49.28%	51,442	50.72%	-1,457	-1.44%	101,427
Stevens	4,015	52.64%	3,612	47.36%	403	5.28%	7,627
Thurston	12,202	51.88%	11,319	48.12%	883	3.75%	23,521
Wahkiakum	900	52.20%	824	47.80%	76	4.41%	1,724
Walla Walla	9,948	57.06%	7,485	42.94%	2,463	14.13%	17,433
Whatcom	16,400	54.45%	13,720	45.55%	2,680	8.90%	30,120
Whitman	8,948	67.24%	4,360	32.76%	4,588	34.48%	13,308
Yakima	30,260	60.99%	19,351	39.01%	10,909	21.99%	49,611
Totals	567,822	52.65%	510,675	47.35%	57,147	5.30%	1,078,497

==== Counties that flipped from Democratic to Republican ====
- Clallam
- Clark
- Kittitas

==== Counties that flipped from Republican to Democratic ====
- Douglas
- Pacific
- Pend Oreille
- Spokane
