= Senator Pridemore =

Senator Pridemore may refer to:

- Auburn Pridemore (1837–1900), Virginia State Senate
- Craig Pridemore (born 1961), Washington State Senate
