= Brett Olson =

Brett Olson or Olsen may refer to:

== Sportsmen ==
- Brett Olson (born 1980), American basketball forward with the 2002–03 Kansas Jayhawks men's basketball team
- Brett Olson (ice hockey) (born 1987), American professional ice hockey forward
- Brett Olson (born 1992), American basketball guard with the 2011–12, 2012–13, 2013–14 and 2014–15 Denver Pioneers men's basketball teams

== Others ==
- Bret Olson, Republican nominee for the Washington House of Representatives elections, 2006
- Brett Olsen, honoured for his role in Trolley Square shooting
- Brett Olsen (Cardfight!! Vanguard), fictional character
