= Phyllis Erickson =

American politician (1923–2013)

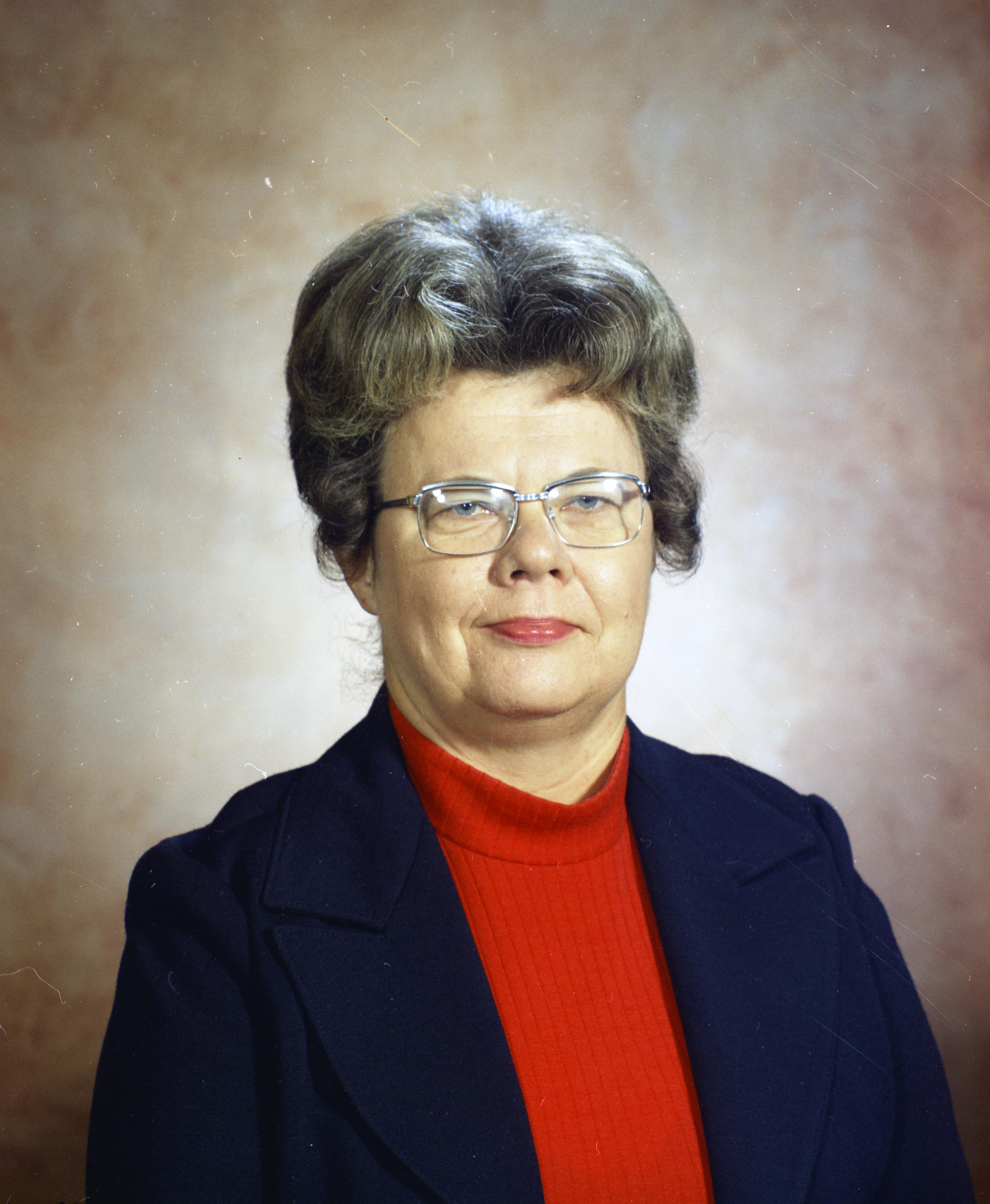
- Erickson in 1973

Member of the Washington House of Representatives from the 2nd district
- In office 1973–1981
- Succeeded by: Duane Kaiser

Personal details
- Born: 1923 Amarillo, Texas, U.S.
- Died: November 27, 2013 (aged 89–90) Tacoma, Washington, U.S.
- Party: Democratic
- Education: University of Utah

Phyllis K. Erickson (1923 – November 27, 2013) was an American politician in the state of Washington. A Democrat, she served in the Washington House of Representatives for the 2nd district between 1973 and 1981.

== Early life ==
Erickson was born in 1923 in Amarillo, Texas. She received her bachelor's and master's degrees in social work from the University of Utah. She was elected to the Franklin-Pierce School Board in 1962, the first woman to hold the position. She was a board member for six years and served as the chair. She joined the League of Women Voters and was appointed as the Washington chapter's state legislative chair. She and her husband, Jack Erickson, had four children.

== Political career ==
Erickson was elected in 1972 as a representative in the Washington House of Representatives for the 2nd district. She ran as a Democrat despite her husband being a Republican precinct committeeman. She was vice-chair of the revenue committee in 1975, chair of the higher education committee in 1977, Democratic chair of the elections and governmental ethics committee in 1979 and ranking minority member of the local government committee in 1981. She resigned on May 11, 1981, to campaign for a position on the Pierce County Council. She was a member of the council between 1981 and 1986, serving as chair for the first year.

== Later life ==
Erickson died on November 27, 2013, in Tacoma, Washington.
