= Herbert M. Hamblen =

American politician (1905–1994)

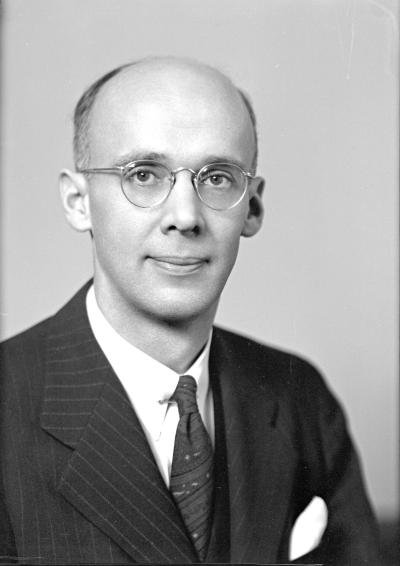
- Hamblen in 1947

28th Speaker of the Washington House of Representatives
- In office January 13, 1947 – January 10, 1949
- Preceded by: George F. Yantis
- Succeeded by: Charles W. Hodde

Member of the Washington House of Representatives for the 37th district
- In office 1943–1949

Personal details
- Born: December 12, 1905 Spokane, Washington, United States
- Died: January 6, 1994 (aged 88) Spokane, Washington, United States
- Party: Republican

Herbert M. Hamblen (December 12, 1905 – January 6, 1994) was an American politician in the state of Washington. He served in the Washington House of Representatives from 1943 to 1949. He was Speaker of the House from 1947 to 1949.
