= Jim McCune =

American politician from Washington

Member of the Washington State Senate from the 2nd district
- Incumbent
- Assumed office January 11, 2021
- Preceded by: Randi Becker

Member of the Pierce County Council from the 3rd district
- In office January 1, 2013 – January 13, 2021
- Preceded by: Roger Bush
- Succeeded by: Amy Cruver

Member of the Washington House of Representatives from the 2nd, Position 1 district
- In office January 3, 2005 – January 14, 2013
- Preceded by: Roger Bush
- Succeeded by: Gary Alexander

Member of the Washington House of Representatives from the 33rd district
- In office January 12, 1998 – January 11, 1999
- Preceded by: John “Rod” Blalock
- Succeeded by: Shay Schual-Berke

Personal details
- Born: September 17, 1950 (age 75) Seattle, Washington, U.S.
- Party: Republican

James G. McCune (born September 17, 1950) is an American politician and businessman serving as a member of the Washington State Senate, representing the 2nd district since 2021. A member of the Republican Party, he previously served as a member of the Pierce County Council, representing the 3rd district from 2017 to 2021. He also served as a member of the Washington House of Representatives from 1998 to 1999 and again from 2005 to 2013.

== Early life and education ==
McCune was born in Seattle and raised in Graham, Washington. He earned his high school diploma from Highline High School in Burien, Washington.

== Career ==
McCune began his career as a provider of Copper River salmon products. He later served on the board of the Prince William Sound Aquaculture Corporation. McCune served as a member of the Washington House of Representatives from 1998 to 1999. In 2004, he was once again elected to the House, serving until 2013.

He then served as a member of the Pierce County Council, representing the 3rd district from 2013 to 2021.

After incumbent Republican Randi Becker announced her retirement from the Washington State Senate, effective after the end of the 2020 legislative session, McCune announced his candidacy to succeed her. McCune placed first in the August 2020 Republican primary and defeated Marilyn Rasmussen in the November general election.

In 2025, McCune was the only senator to vote against a bill by Democratic senator Yasmin Trudeau that would have the state officially recognize the Islamic holidays of Eid al-Fitr and Eid al-Adha.
