= Washington's 2nd legislative district =

American legislative district

Coordinates: 46°55′N 122°5′W

Washington 2nd legislative district map

Washington's 2nd legislative district is one of forty-nine districts in Washington state for representation in the state legislature. The district runs mostly east-west along the southern extreme of Pierce County but also includes part of Thurston County, including Yelm and Lacey.

The largely rural district is represented by state senator Jim McCune and state representatives Andrew Barkis (position 1) and Matt Marshall (position 2), all Republicans.

== Past legislators ==
=== Statehood-1932 ===
During this period, the state senate and state house districts were geographically distinct.

Year	Senate		House		
Year	Senator	Senate District Geography	House Position 1	House Position 2	House District Geography
1st (1889-1890)	E. B. Hyde (R) (Note: This district was represented by three senators simultaneously from 1889-1890.)	Spokane County			
1st (1889-1890)	B. C. Van Houten (R)	Spokane County			
1st (1889-1890)	Alexander Watt (R)	Spokane County			
2nd (1891-1892)	James O'Neill (R)	Spokane (part) and Stevens Counties	House District Established		Spokane County (part)
2nd (1891-1892)	James O'Neill (R)	Spokane (part) and Stevens Counties	David Lehman (R)		Spokane County (part)
3rd (1893-1894)	James O'Neill (R)	Spokane (part) and Stevens Counties	George H. Collin (P.P.)		Spokane County (part)
4th (1895-1896)	Willard B. Field (P.P.), (Pop.) (Note: Switched to the Populist Party in 1897.)	Spokane (part) and Stevens Counties	George H. Collin (P.P.)		Spokane County (part)
5th (1897-1898)	Willard B. Field (P.P.), (Pop.)	Spokane (part) and Stevens Counties	David R. Lusher (Pop.)		Spokane County (part)
6th (1899-1900)	Charles A. Mantz (P.P.) (Note: Switched to the Democratic Party in 1901.)	Spokane (part) and Ferry Counties	Hiram E. Allen (R)		Spokane County (part)
7th (1901-1902)	Charles A. Mantz (P.P.)	Spokane (part) and Ferry Counties	Samuel Miller (D)		Spokane County (part)
8th (1903-1904)	M. E. Stansell (R)	Stevens County	P. F. Quinn (D)	Position Established	Spokane County (part)
8th (1903-1904)	M. E. Stansell (R)	Stevens County	P. F. Quinn (D)	J. J. Fitzgerald (D)	Spokane County (part)
9th (1905-1906)	M. E. Stansell (R)	Stevens County	Jesse Huxtable (R)	Daniel Hoch (R)	Spokane County (part)
10th (1907-1908)	A. W. Anderson (R)	Stevens County	Jesse Huxtable (R)	Harry A. Rhodes (R)	Spokane County (part)
11th (1909-1910)	A. W. Anderson (R)	Stevens County	Harry C. Hayward (R)	R. E. Buchanan (R)	Spokane County (part)
12th (1911-1912)	A. W. Anderson (R)	Stevens County	R. E. Buchanan (R)	W. E. Stephens (R)	Spokane County (part)
13th (1913-1914)	A. W. Anderson (R)	Stevens and Pend Oreille Counties (Note: Pend Oreille County was created in 1911. The district did not change and contained the same voters as before 1911.)	Zachariah Stewart (R)	Chas. H. Merriam (Prog.)	Spokane County (part)
14th (1915-1916)	C. R. McMillan (D)	Stevens and Pend Oreille Counties	Zachariah Stewart (R)	John L. Wiley (D)	Spokane County (part)
15th (1917-1918)	C. R. McMillan (D)	Stevens and Pend Oreille Counties	Ira Honefenger (R)	Linneus Lincoln Westfall (R)	Spokane County (part)
16th (1919-1920)	W. Lon Johnson (R) (Note: Resigned in late 1924. Elected Lt. Governor.)	Stevens and Pend Oreille Counties	Arthur L. True (R)	Linneus Lincoln Westfall (R)	Spokane County (part)
17th (1921-1922)	W. Lon Johnson (R)	Stevens and Pend Oreille Counties	Arthur L. True (R)	Leo L. Miller (R)	Spokane County (part)
18th (1923-1924)	W. Lon Johnson (R)	Stevens and Pend Oreille Counties	Arthur L. True (R)	Grant E. Hunt (R)	Spokane County (part)
19th (1925-1926)	Vacant (Note: The seat was vacant until a special election in 1925. Vacancies could only be filled by special election called by the governor until 1930)	Stevens and Pend Oreille Counties	Arthur L. True (R)	Isaac N. Stephens (R)	Spokane County (part)
19th (1925-1926)	Louis A. Conyard (R) (Note: Elected in a 1925 special election)	Stevens and Pend Oreille Counties	Arthur L. True (R)	Isaac N. Stephens (R)	Spokane County (part)
20th (1927-1928)	William G. Hartwell Sr. (R)	Stevens and Pend Oreille Counties	Isaac N. Stephens (R)	Grant E. Hunt (R)	Spokane County (part)
21st (1929-1930)	William G. Hartwell Sr. (R)	Stevens and Pend Oreille Counties	A. G. Hall (R)	Nelson J. Bostwick (R)	Spokane County (part)
22nd (1931-1932)	William G. Hartwell Sr. (R)	Stevens and Pend Oreille Counties	George Elmer Brown (R)	Dayton H. Stewart (R)	Spokane County (part)

=== 1933-Present ===
After the passage of Initiative 57 and the 1930 redistricting cycle, the state senate and state house districts were geographically similar. While some senate districts would occasionally be broken up into house seats A and B, seats A and B were always contained in the Senate district boundaries.

The 2nd Legislative district's state senate and house seats are identical geographically from 1933 to the present day.

Year	Senate	House		District Geography
Year	Senator	House Position 1	House Position 2	District Geography
23rd (1933-1934)	William G. Hartwell Sr. (R)	H. B. Clark (D)	Frank Schultz (D)	Stevens and Pend Oreille Counties
24th (1935-1936)	David E. McMillan (D)	Walter A. Johnson (D)	Frank Schultz (D)	Stevens and Pend Oreille Counties
25th (1937-1938)	David E. McMillan (D)	Charles W. Hodde (D)	Frank Schultz (D)	Stevens and Pend Oreille Counties
26th (1939-1940)	David E. McMillan (D)	Lester E. Babcock (R)	Wallace Beckley (R)	Stevens and Pend Oreille Counties
27th (1941-1942)	David E. McMillan (D)	P. H. Graham (D)	Walter A. Johnson (D)	Stevens and Pend Oreille Counties
28th (1943-1944)	B. J. Dahl (R)	Charles W. Hodde (D)	E. E. Hupp (R) (Note: Resigned Feb 1944)	Stevens and Pend Oreille Counties
28th (1943-1944)	B. J. Dahl (R)	Charles W. Hodde (D)	Earl G. Griffith (R) (Note: Appointed 1944)	Stevens and Pend Oreille Counties
29th (1945-1946)	B. J. Dahl (R)	Earl G. Griffith (R)	Charles W. Hodde (D)	Stevens and Pend Oreille Counties
30th (1947-1948)	B. J. Dahl (R)	Earl G. Griffith (R)	Charles W. Hodde (D)	Stevens and Pend Oreille Counties
31st (1949-1950)	B. J. Dahl (R)	Charles W. Hodde (D) (Note: Elected Speaker of the House)	K. O. Rosenberg (D)	Stevens and Pend Oreille Counties
32nd (1951-1952)	B. J. Dahl (R)	Earl G. Griffith (R)	Charles W. Hodde (D)	Stevens and Pend Oreille Counties
33rd (1953-1954)	B. J. Dahl (R)	Earl G. Griffith (R)	K. O. Rosenberg (D)	Stevens and Pend Oreille Counties
34th (1955-1956)	B. J. Dahl (R)	Earl G. Griffith (R)	K. O. Rosenberg (D)	Stevens and Pend Oreille Counties
35th (1957-1958)	B. J. Dahl (R)	Earl G. Griffith (R)	K. O. Rosenberg (D)	Stevens and Pend Oreille Counties
36th (1959-1960)	David E. McMillan (D) (Note: Redistricted out of the district)	Art Avey (D)	K. O. Rosenberg (D)	Stevens and Pend Oreille Counties
37th (1961-1962)	David E. McMillan (D)	Art Avey (D)	Drennan McElroy (D)	Stevens and Pend Oreille Counties
38th (1963-1964)	David E. McMillan (D)	Drennan McElroy (D)	K. O. Rosenberg (D)	Stevens and Pend Oreille Counties
39th (1965-1966)	David E. McMillan (D)	Art Avey (D)	Frank Slagle (D)	Stevens and Pend Oreille Counties
40th (1967-1968)	David E. McMillan (D)	Art Avey (D)	Joe Haussler (D)	1965 Redistricting
40th (1967-1968)	David E. McMillan (D)	Art Avey (D)	Joe Haussler (D)	Pierce County (part) and Thurston County (part)
41st (1969-1970)	Bruce A. Wilson (D)	Joe Haussler (D)	Bill Schumaker (R)	Pierce County (part) and Thurston County (part)
42nd (1971-1972)	Bruce A. Wilson (D)	Joe Haussler (D)	Bill Schumaker (R)	Pierce County (part) and Thurston County (part)
43rd (1973-1974)	R. Ted Bottiger (D) (Note: Resigned Nov 20, 1987. Appointed to Northwest Power Planning Council)	Wayne Ehlers (D) (Note: Elected Speaker of the House for 48th and 49th legislative sessions (1983-86))	Phyllis Erickson (D) (Note: Resigned May 11, 1981)	1972 Redistricting
43rd (1973-1974)	R. Ted Bottiger (D)	Wayne Ehlers (D)	Phyllis Erickson (D)	Pierce County (part) and Thurston County (part)
44th (1975-1976)	R. Ted Bottiger (D)	Wayne Ehlers (D)	Phyllis Erickson (D)	Pierce County (part) and Thurston County (part)
45th (1977-1978)	R. Ted Bottiger (D)	Wayne Ehlers (D)	Phyllis Erickson (D)	Pierce County (part) and Thurston County (part)
46th (1979-1980)	R. Ted Bottiger (D)	Wayne Ehlers (D)	Phyllis Erickson (D)	Pierce County (part) and Thurston County (part)
47th (1981-1982)	R. Ted Bottiger (D)	Wayne Ehlers (D)	Phyllis Erickson (D)	Pierce County (part) and Thurston County (part)
47th (1981-1982)	R. Ted Bottiger (D)	Wayne Ehlers (D)	Duane L. Kaiser (D) (Note: Appointed Jun. 22, 1981. Elected Nov. 3, 1981 to serve unexpired term.)	Pierce County (part) and Thurston County (part)
48th (1983-1984)	R. Ted Bottiger (D)	Wayne Ehlers (D)	Duane L. Kaiser (D)	Pierce County (part) and Thurston County (part)
49th (1985-1986)	R. Ted Bottiger (D)	Wayne Ehlers (D)	Ken Madsen (D) (Note: Appointed Dec. 14, 1987 to the senate to serve unexpired term.)	Pierce County (part) and Thurston County (part)
50th (1987-1988)	R. Ted Bottiger (D)	Marilyn Rasmussen (D)	Ken Madsen (D)	Pierce County (part) and Thurston County (part)
50th (1987-1988)	Ken Madsen (D)	Marilyn Rasmussen (D)	Randy Dorn (D)	Pierce County (part) and Thurston County (part)
51st (1989-1990)	Ken Madsen (D)	Marilyn Rasmussen (D)	Randy Dorn (D)	Pierce County (part) and Thurston County (part)
52nd (1991-1992)	Ken Madsen (D)	Marilyn Rasmussen (D)	Randy Dorn (D)	Pierce County (part) and Thurston County (part)
53rd (1993-1994)	Marilyn Rasmussen (D)	Tom Campbell (D)	Randy Dorn (D)	Pierce County (part)
54th (1995-1996)	Marilyn Rasmussen (D)	Tom Campbell (R) (Note: Switched party affiliation to Republican on Jan 31, 1995)	Scott Smith (R)	Pierce County (part)
55th (1997-1998)	Marilyn Rasmussen (D)	Roger Bush (R)	Scott Smith (R)	Pierce County (part)
56th (1999-2000)	Marilyn Rasmussen (D)	Roger Bush (R)	Tom Campbell (R)	Pierce County (part)
57th (2001-2002)	Marilyn Rasmussen (D)	Roger Bush (R)	Tom Campbell (R)	Pierce County (part)
58th (2003-2004)	Marilyn Rasmussen (D)	Roger Bush (R)	Tom Campbell (R)	Pierce County (part) and Thurston County (part)
59th (2005-2006)	Marilyn Rasmussen (D)	Jim McCune (R)	Tom Campbell (R)	Pierce County (part) and Thurston County (part)
60th (2007-2008)	Marilyn Rasmussen (D)	Jim McCune (R)	Tom Campbell (R)	Pierce County (part) and Thurston County (part)
61st (2009-2010)	Randi Becker (R)	Jim McCune (R)	Tom Campbell (R)	Pierce County (part) and Thurston County (part)
62nd (2011-2012)	Randi Becker (R)	Jim McCune (R)	J. T. Wilcox (R)	Pierce County (part) and Thurston County (part)
63rd (2013-2014)	Randi Becker (R)	Gary C. Alexander (R) (Note: Resigned Dec. 31, 2013)	J. T. Wilcox (R)	Pierce County (part) and Thurston County (part)
63rd (2013-2014)	Randi Becker (R)	Graham Hunt (R) (Note: Appointed Jan. 17, 2014.) (Note: Resigned Feb. 16, 2016)	J. T. Wilcox (R)	Pierce County (part) and Thurston County (part)
64th (2015-2016)	Randi Becker (R)	Graham Hunt (R)	J. T. Wilcox (R)	Pierce County (part) and Thurston County (part)
64th (2015-2016)	Randi Becker (R)	Andrew Barkis (R)	J. T. Wilcox (R)	Pierce County (part) and Thurston County (part)
65th (2017-2018)	Randi Becker (R)	Andrew Barkis (R)	J. T. Wilcox (R)	Pierce County (part) and Thurston County (part)
66th (2019-2020)	Randi Becker (R)	Andrew Barkis (R)	J. T. Wilcox (R)	Pierce County (part) and Thurston County (part)
67th (2021-2022)	Jim McCune (R)	Andrew Barkis (R)	J. T. Wilcox (R)	Pierce County (part) and Thurston County (part)
68th (2023-2024)	Jim McCune (R)	Andrew Barkis (R)	J. T. Wilcox (R)	Pierce County (part) and Thurston County (part)
69th (2025-2026)	Jim McCune (R)	Andrew Barkis (R)	Matt Marshall (R)	Pierce County (part) and Thurston County (part)

== Key ==
Democratic (D)
Populist (Pop)
Progressive (Bull Moose) (Prog)
Republican (R)

- P.P. is People's Party which was closely associate with the Populist Party.

== See also ==
- Washington Redistricting Commission
- Washington State Legislature
- Washington State Senate
- Washington House of Representatives
- Washington (state) legislative districts
