= R. Mort Frayn =

American politician (1906–1993)

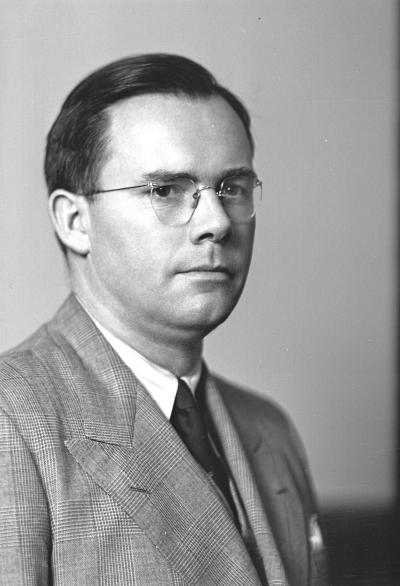

30th Speaker of the Washington House of Representatives
- In office January 12, 1953 – January 10, 1955
- Preceded by: Charles W. Hodde
- Succeeded by: John L. O'Brien

Member of the Washington House of Representatives from the 43rd district
- In office January 13, 1947 – January 14, 1957
- Preceded by: Clinton S. Harley
- Succeeded by: Daniel J. Evans

Personal details
- Born: Robert Mort Frayn; May 3, 1906 Faulkton, South Dakota, U.S.
- Died: August 1, 1993 (aged 87) Seattle, Washington, U.S.
- Party: Republican

Robert Mort Frayn (May 3, 1906 – August 1, 1993) was an American politician in the state of Washington. He served in the Washington House of Representatives from 1947 to 1957 for District 43. He was Speaker of the House from 1953 to 1955.
