= Albert Bauer =

American educator and politician (1928–2021)

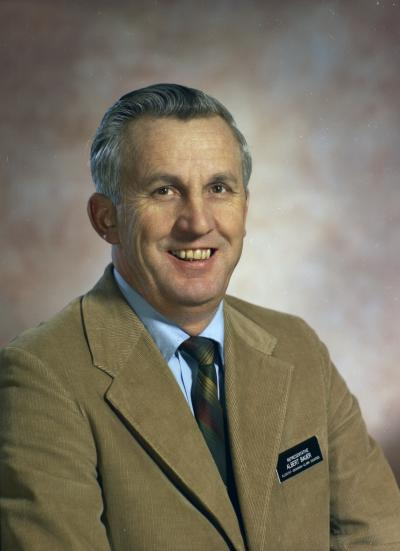
- Albert Bauer in 1971

Member of the Washington Senate from the 49th district
- In office 1981–2001

Member of the Washington House of Representatives from the 49th district
- In office 1973–1981
- Succeeded by: Joseph E. King

Member of the Washington House of Representatives from the 17th district
- In office 1971–1973

Personal details
- Born: June 6, 1928 Lewistown, Montana
- Died: April 21, 2021 (aged 92) Vancouver, Washington
- Party: Democratic
- Occupation: teacher, politician

Military service
- Branch/service: United States Navy

Albert Bauer (June 6, 1928 – April 21, 2021) was an American politician in the American state of Washington.

== Early life ==
Bauer was born in Lewistown, Montana and attended Clark Community College, Portland State College, and Oregon State University. A Navy veteran, he was a teacher before entering politics.

== Career ==
Bauer was elected to the Washington House of Representatives in 1971 to the 49th district, and served until 1980, when he ran for the state senate. In the latter three years, he served as the House Democratic Caucus Chairman. He served in the Washington State Senate from 1981 to 2001 as a Democrat representing the 49th district. From 1999 to 2001, he was Senate Vice President Pro Tempore.

== Awards and honors ==
Bauer Hall at Clark College is named in his honour. He has received many awards, including the Washington State School Principals’ Legislator of the Year Award, Mother Joseph Legislative Award, Betty Sharff Memorial Award, HOSTS Corporation, Personal Commitment to Improve Education, Phi Delta Kappa Award, Bauer Hall, and the Washington State Educational Service District’s Walter G. Turner Award.

== Personal life ==
Bauer was married to Patricia and has three children.

He died of a stroke on April 21, 2021, in Vancouver, Washington, at age 92.
