= Graham Hunt (politician) =

American politician

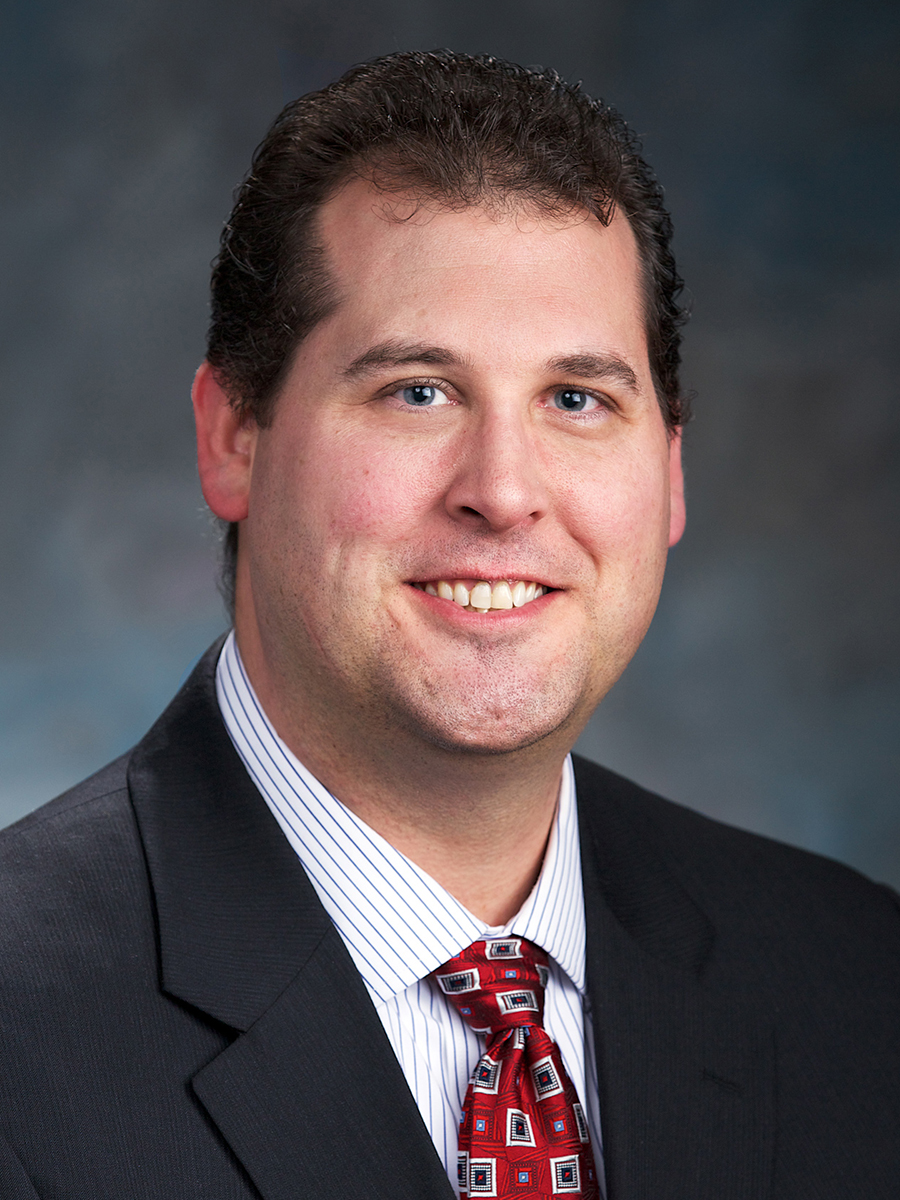

Member of the Washington House of Representatives from the 2nd district
- In office January 18, 2014 – February 2, 2016
- Preceded by: Gary Alexander
- Succeeded by: Andrew Barkis

Orting City Council, Position No. 1
- In office September 8, 2010 – June 2014
- Preceded by: Joachim Pestinger
- Succeeded by: Tod Gunther

Personal details
- Born: April 21, 1979 (age 47)
- Party: Republican
- Education: American InterContinental University (AA); American InterContinental University (BBA)
- Profession: Insurance broker Small business owner
- Website: Official

Graham R. Hunt (born April 21, 1979) is an American businessman and politician of the Republican Party. He is a former member of the Washington House of Representatives, representing the 2nd Legislative District.

== Career ==
Hunt served in the Arizona Air National Guard from 1998 to 2005, reaching the rank of Staff Sergeant.

In 2010 Hunt was selected by the Orting City Council to fill the position vacated by former Councilmember Joachim Pestinger. The following year, Hunt ran unopposed to retain his seat. Hunt served as the chair for the Transportation Committee and co-chair for Public Safety.

Hunt was appointed to the state legislature on January 17, 2014, by the Thurston County Board of Commissioners and Pierce County County Council, despite being the second choice of the Republican Precinct Committee Officers from the district. He was sworn in the following day. Hunt then went on to win the general election in 2014, receiving 62.53% of the vote. Hunt served on the House Appropriations Committee, Business and Financial Services and was the Assistant Ranking on the Labor Committee.

Hunt advocated for funds to renovate a veterans cemetery in Orting and for Bathroom bills in Washington State.

In November 2015, it was announced that Hunt would chair the Ted Cruz 2016 presidential campaign in Washington state.

=== Coalition of Western States (COWS) ===
Hunt was a member of COWS, a group of state lawmakers which sought to "restore management of public lands to the States where it Constitutionally belongs." COWS was co-founded by then Washington state representative Matt Shea.

In January 2016, Hunt and Shea were part of a delegation of lawmakers who visited the Occupation of the Malheur National Wildlife Refuge. They met with local officials to advocate for the militants' demand that control over federal land should be transferred to states. Hunt proposed that these transfers could occur as a "conversation over a prolonged period of time".

In 2019, a Washington State-commissioned report found that Shea had committed domestic terrorism for his role in the Malheur occupation and that Hunt was copied on planning emails.

=== Military service controversy and resignation ===
In January 2016, The Seattle Times reported that Hunt's military records did not support some claims that he had made about his military career. Hunt had claimed to be the recipient of the Air Force Commendation Medal, the Iraq Campaign Medal, and the Afghanistan Campaign Medal and to be a combat veteran of Iraq and Afghanistan. After he was interviewed by The Seattle Times, he removed these statements from his online biographies and said he had not intended to deceive anyone.

The Seattle Times also reported that in 2014 a photo was posted to Hunt's Facebook account with the caption: "This picture of me was taken after a mortar attack in 2005". The photo was actually of two military policemen, not of Hunt. Hunt said a campaign volunteer had posted it but took full responsibility. Two state Republican staffers later alleged that they had questioned Hunt about the authenticity of the photo after it was posted and that he had confirmed that it was him.

After two local politicians publicly questioned claims Hunt had made about his military service and Republican Minority Leader Dan Kristiansen called for him to resolve the controversy or step down, Hunt announced his immediate resignation. However, he stated: "I have nothing to conceal, nor have I ever deliberately conducted myself in a manner that compromises my integrity or the integrity of this office".

A few months later, Hunt released amended military records and said that his resignation had been a mistake. The new records showed that he had been awarded multiple medals but that they were different from the ones he had previously claimed; additionally they showed that he had served in a combat zone in the Middle East during the Iraq war but did not indicate that it was in Iraq or Afghanistan. In response, state Republican staffer Kevin Carns said that the records did not prove Hunt's claims and that Hunt had destroyed his credibility.

== Awards ==
- 2014 Guardians of Small Business award. Presented by NFIB.
