= Bill Brumsickle =

American politician (1935–2024)

Member of the Washington House of Representatives from the 20th district
- In office 1989–1997
- Preceded by: Barbara J. Holm
- Succeeded by: Gary Alexander

Personal details
- Born: William T. Brumsickle; April 25, 1935 White Salmon, Washington, U.S.
- Died: November 27, 2024 (aged 89) Centralia, Washington, U.S.
- Party: Republican
- Education: Western Washington College of Education

William T. Brumsickle (April 25, 1935 – November 27, 2024) was an American politician. A member of the Republican Party, he served in the Washington House of Representatives from 1989 to 1997.

== Life and career ==
Brumsickle was born in White Salmon, Washington, the son of James and Allene Brumsickle. He attended Western Washington College of Education, earning his bachelor's degree in teaching.

Brumsickle served in the Washington House of Representatives from 1989 to 1997.

== Death ==
Brumsickle died on November 27, 2024, in Centralia, Washington, at the age of 89.
