= Sharon Wylie =

American politician (born 1949)

Member of the Washington House of Representatives from the 49th district
- Incumbent
- Assumed office April 13, 2011 Serving with Monica Stonier
- Preceded by: Jim Jacks

Member of the Oregon House of Representatives from the 22nd district
- In office January 11, 1993 – January 13, 1997
- Preceded by: Ron Sunseri
- Succeeded by: Ron Sunseri

Personal details
- Born: July 12, 1949 (age 77) New Orleans, Louisiana, U.S.
- Party: Democratic
- Spouse: Ted H. Gathe
- Education: University of California, Riverside (BA)
- Profession: Government relations officer City administrator
- Website: Official

Sharon L. Wylie (born July 12, 1949) is an American politician of the Democratic Party. She is a member of the Washington House of Representatives, representing the 49th district since 2011. Wylie previously served in the Oregon House of Representatives from 1993 to 1997, representing the 22nd district.

== Career ==
Wylie has a bachelor's degree in political science from the University of California, Riverside, and moved to Washington to become the city administrator of Tukwila in 1981. She was later employed by the King County government and moved to Gresham, Oregon. Wylie was an aide to two Multnomah County Commissioners and helped organize the Gresham farmers' market. She filed her intent to run for the 22nd district seat in the Oregon House of Representatives in February 1992.

The incumbent representative from the 22nd district, Ron Sunseri, withdrew from the race in August 1992 and left Wylie running against a last-minute Republican opponent. She won the seat by a large margin, defeating Francis Martinez in the general election. Wylie won re-election in a "heated" 1994 rematch with Martinez that included attack ads and over $125,000 in funds raised by both campaigns ahead of the general election. In December 1995, Wylie announced that she would not run for a third term.

Her husband, Ted Gathe, was hired in 1994 as city attorney of Vancouver, Washington, leading to speculation that Wylie would move out of Oregon; she would remain eligible to serve in the Oregon House unless expelled by a vote. Wylie served the remainder of her House term while living in Gresham and moved to Vancouver with her husband and children in 2002. She was hired by the Clark County government in 2001 to serve as a government relations manager and lobbyist to the state legislature.

On April 13, 2011, Wylie was appointed by the Clark County Commission to a vacant Washington House of Representatives seat from the 49th district. She took office later that day in Olympia to finish the remaining months of the term. Wylie ran for a permanent term and defeated her Republican opponent by a margin of 13 percent in the November 2011 general election. She is the chair of the Regulated Substances and Gaming Committee and a member of the House Finance Committee. Wylie is also a member of the Washington State Arts Commission and the Washington Economic Development Finance Authority.

== Personal life ==
Wylie is married to Ted Gathe, the former city attorney of Vancouver. They have two daughters.
