= Wayne Ehlers =

American politician from Washington

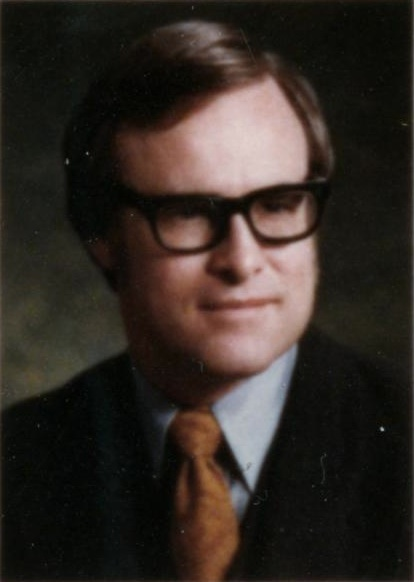
- Wayne Ehlers in 1977

42nd Speaker of the Washington House of Representatives
- In office January 10, 1983 – January 12, 1987
- Preceded by: William M. Polk
- Succeeded by: Joseph E. King

Minority Leader of the Washington House of Representatives
- In office January 11, 1982 – January 10, 1983
- Preceded by: Dick King
- Succeeded by: Gary A. Nelson

Member of the Washington House of Representatives from the 2nd, Position 1 district
- In office January 8, 1973 – January 12, 1987
- Preceded by: Joe Haussler
- Succeeded by: Marilyn Rasmussen

Personal details
- Born: 1938 (age 87–88) Bellingham, Washington, U.S.
- Party: Democratic

Wayne Ehlers (born 1938) is an American former politician in the state of Washington. He was the Washington state Representative for the 2nd district from 1975 to 1979. He was also Speaker of the Washington state House from 1983 to 1987.
