= Bill Fromhold =

American politician from Washington (1942–2010)

Member of the Washington House of Representatives from the 49th district
- In office January 8, 2001 – January 12, 2009
- Preceded by: Don Carlson
- Succeeded by: Jim Jacks

Personal details
- Born: August 11, 1942 Seattle, Washington
- Died: September 30, 2010 (aged 68) Seattle, Washington
- Party: Democratic

Charles W. "Bill" Fromhold (August 11, 1942 – September 30, 2010) was an American politician who served in the Washington House of Representatives from the 49th district from 2001 to 2009.

He died of leukemia on September 30, 2010, in Seattle, Washington at age 68.
