= Joe Haussler =

American politician

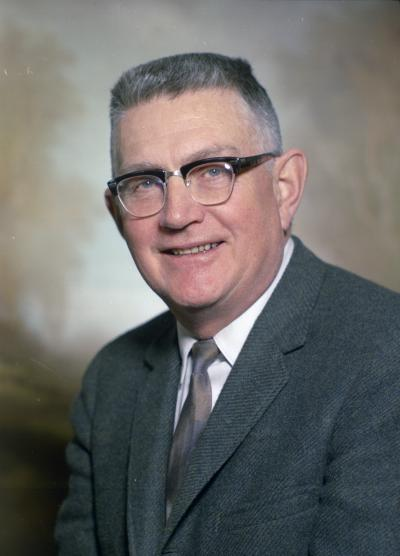
- Joe Haussler in 1973

Member of the Washington House of Representatives from the 1st district
- In office 1963–1965
- Preceded by: John Goldmark

Member of the Washington House of Representatives from the 2nd district
- In office 1967 – January 1977
- Succeeded by: Wayne Ehlers

Personal details
- Born: May 19, 1902 Alvin, Texas, United States
- Died: September 9, 1989 (aged 87) Omak, Washington, U.S.
- Party: Democratic

Joseph D. Haussler (May 19, 1902 – September 9, 1989) was an American politician in the state of Washington. He served in the Washington House of Representatives from 1963 to 1965 and from 1967 to 1977.
