= Andrew Barkis =

American politician

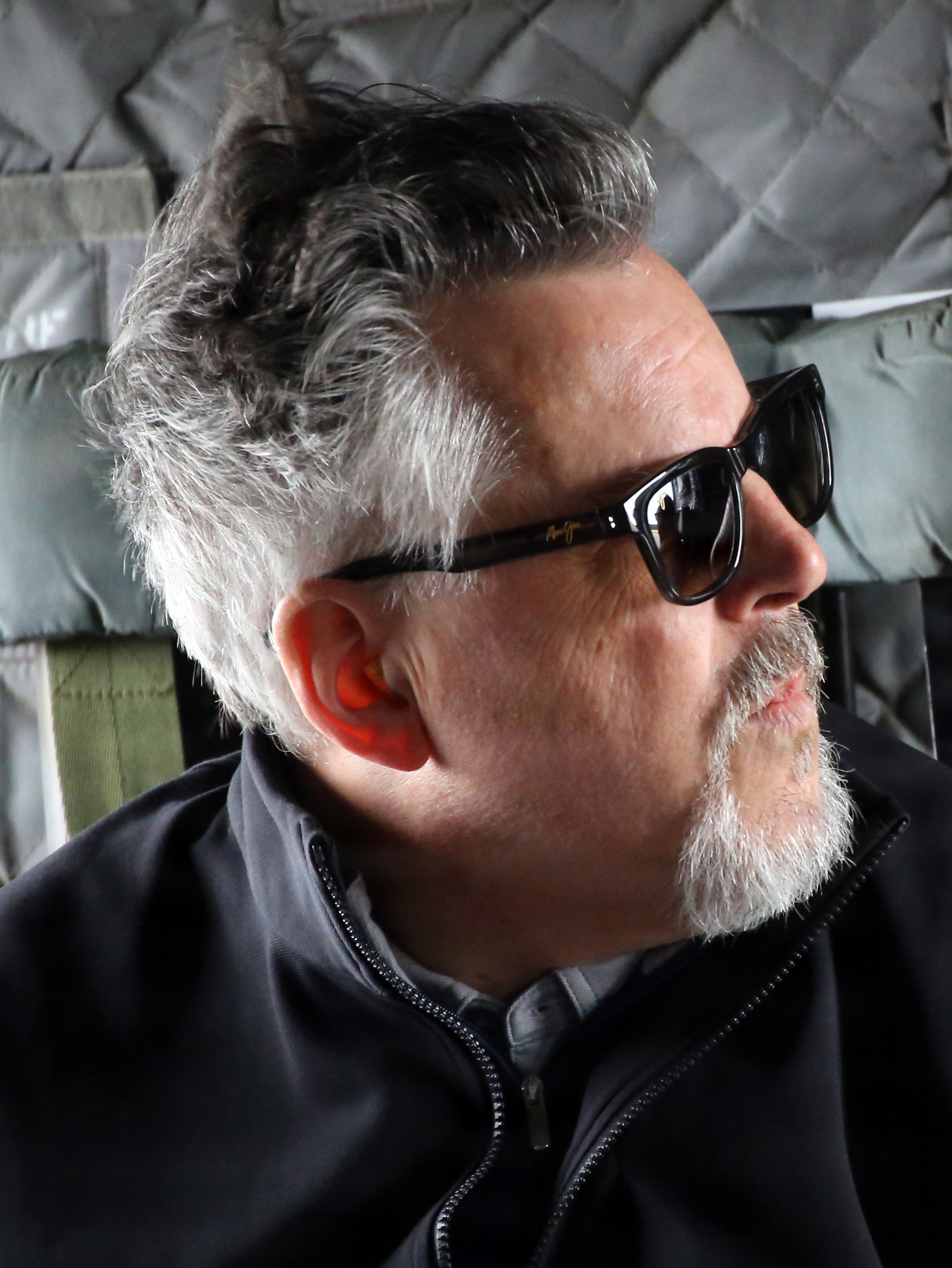

Member of the Washington House of Representatives from the 2nd district
- Incumbent
- Assumed office February 16, 2016 Serving with J. T. Wilcox
- Preceded by: Graham Hunt

Personal details
- Born: 1968 (age 57–58) Chehalis, Washington, U.S.
- Party: Republican
- Spouse: Lisa Barkis
- Children: 2
- Education: Centralia College (AA); Seattle University (BA)
- Occupation: Property manager, politician

Andrew K. Barkis (born 1968) is a Republican member of the Washington House of Representatives. He was appointed to the legislature in February 2016 to succeed fellow Republican Graham Hunt, who resigned.

He is the ranking minority member on the Community Development, Housing & Tribal Affairs Committee. He also serves on the House Consumer Protection & Business Committee.

In 2024, he was the lead sponsor of state legislation to allow residential property owners to split their lots into smaller parcels.

== Awards ==
- 2020 Guardians of Small Business. Presented by NFIB.

== Personal life ==
Barkis lives in Lacey with his wife Lisa. They have 2 children.
