= E. R. Pickrell =

American politician

Member of the Washington House of Representatives
- In office 1889–1891

Personal details
- Born: February 18, 1858 Porter County, Indiana, United States
- Died: February 4, 1894 (aged 35) Whitman County, Washington, United States
- Party: Republican

E. R. Pickrell (February 18, 1858 – February 5, 1894) was an American politician in the state of Washington. He served in the Washington House of Representatives from 1889 to 1891.
