= Craig Pridemore =

American politician

Member of the Washington Senate from the 49th district
- In office January 10, 2005 - January 14, 2013
- Preceded by: Don Carlson
- Succeeded by: Annette Cleveland

Personal details
- Born: March 13, 1961 (age 65)
- Party: Democratic
- Education: University of Washington
- Profession: business manager

Craig A. Pridemore (born March 13, 1961) is an American politician. He is a former Democratic member of the Washington State Senate, representing the 49th district from 2005 until his retirement in 2013. He was a candidate for Washington State Auditor in 2012. He was a candidate for the United States House of Representatives for Washington's 3rd congressional district in the 2010 election to succeed retiring Congressman Brian Baird. He dropped out of the race before the Primary Election, which was won by Jaime Herrera Beutler.

Pridemore ran for the Board of Clark County Commissioners, District 3, in 2014, but he lost to Jeanne E. Stewart.

== Background ==
He is an active duty veteran of the United States Army, serving in the military intelligence field from 1983 to 1987. He was highly decorated for peacetime, earning the Army Commendation Medal, 1st Oak Leaf Cluster, 3rd Oak Leaf Cluster, and the Army Achievement Medal. In 1986, he was named Sergeant of the Year at Fort Monmouth, New Jersey.

== Elected office ==
In 2004, Pridemore was elected to the Washington State Senate to represent the 49th legislative district as a Democrat. He served on the Joint Legislative Audit and Review Committee, Economic & Revenue Forecast Council, and chaired the Select Committee on Pension Policy during his time in the Washington State Senate. Prior to being elected to the Senate, he served as Clark County Commissioner from 1998 to 2004. Prior to being elected Clark County Commissioner, Sen. Pridemore served as finance manager and analyst for the county's departments of Public Works and Community Development. From 1990 to 1992, he was firm administrator for the 19th largest certified public accounting firm in Los Angeles.

== Awards and recognition ==
Pridemore is a recipient of the 2008 Fuse "Sizzle" Award "for courageous and principled leadership based on the progressive values that make our country great." Fuse, a Washington-based online advocacy group, recognized Sen. Pridemore for his central role in the passage of the Working Families Tax Credit, as well as for his dedication to conservation issues.

Other honors include:

- Recipient of the Clark County Developmental Disabilities Advisory Board's Dennis Campbell Outstanding Service Award; October 2007
- Honored by the Washington School Nutrition Association for strengthening Washington's school breakfast programs in the 2006 legislative session
- 2006 Washington Conservation Voters Legislator of the Year
- Clark County Youth House Community Inspiration Award, May 2006
- 2006 Outstanding Legislator, Children's Alliance
- Fort Monmouth Sergeant of the Year, US Army, 1986
- Army Commendation Medal
- Army Achievement Medal.
