= Shay Schual-Berke =

Washington State politician

Member of the Washington House of Representatives from the 33rd district
- In office January 11, 1999 – January 12, 2009
- Preceded by: James McCune
- Succeeded by: Tina Orwall

Personal details
- Born: January 14, 1952 New York, New York, U.S.
- Party: Democratic
- Education: Washington University in St. Louis (B.A.), New York Medical College (M.D.), Oregon Health Sciences University (board certification, internal medicine and cardiology)
- Occupation: Cardiologist

Shay Schual-Berke (born January 14, 1952) is a former American politician who served as a member of the Washington House of Representatives from 1999 to 2009. She represented Washington's 33rd legislative district as a Democrat. Before election to the legislature, she served from 1995 to 1999 as a member of the Highline School Board.

Her community service has included work for Northwest Harvest, Mount Rainier High School Foundation, among others. In the legislature, she served on multiple committees, with leadership roles including vice-chair of the health care committee (1999 and 2001) and chair of the financial institutions and insurance committee (2003).
