= Tom Campbell (Washington politician) =

American chiropractor and politician

Member of the Washington House of Representatives from the 2nd, Position 2 district
- In office January 11, 1999 – January 10, 2011
- Preceded by: Scott Smith
- Succeeded by: J. T. Wilcox

Member of the Washington House of Representatives from the 2nd, Position 1 district
- In office January 11, 1993 – January 3, 1997
- Preceded by: Marilyn Rasmussen
- Succeeded by: Roger Bush

Personal details
- Born: October 27, 1954 (age 71) Brooklyn, New York, U.S.
- Party: Republican (1995–present)
- Other political affiliations: Democratic (before 1995)
- Spouse: Lynn Campbell
- Children: 3
- Education: University of Central Florida (AA); Seattle University (BA); Life Chiropractic College West (MS)
- Occupation: Chiropractor

Thomas J. Campbell (born October 27, 1954) is an American chiropractor and politician who served as a member of the Washington House of Representatives, representing the 2nd district from 1993 to 1997 and again from 1999 to 2011. Initially elected as a Democrat, he became a Republican on January 31, 1995. He was defeated by Republican J. T. Wilcox in his 2010 reelection bid.
