= K. O. Rosenberg =

American politician

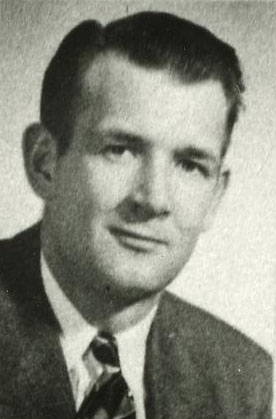
- Rosenberg in 1949

Member of the Washington House of Representatives for the 5th district
- In office 1949–1951; 1953–1965

Personal details
- Born: January 15, 1920 Spokane, Washington, United States
- Died: February 1, 2016 (aged 96) Addy, Washington
- Party: Democratic

Kenneth O. Rosenberg (January 15, 1920 – February 1, 2016) was an American politician in the state of Washington. He served in the Washington House of Representatives from 1951 to 1967 for district 5. He lived in Addy, Washington.
