= Randi Becker =

American politician (born 1948)

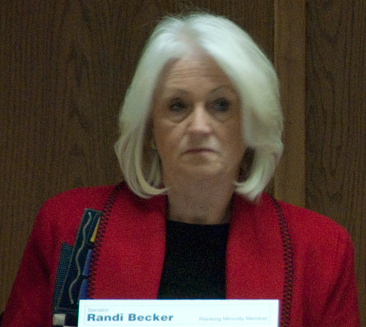
- Randi Becker 2011

Member of the Washington Senate from the 2nd district
- In office January 11, 2009 – January 11, 2021
- Preceded by: Marilyn Rasmussen
- Succeeded by: Jim McCune

Personal details
- Born: July 12, 1948 (age 78) Tacoma, Washington, U.S.
- Party: Republican
- Spouse: Robert L. "Bob" Becker
- Children: 2
- Education: Green River Community College (attended)
- Occupation: Medical administrator (retired), Flight attendant
- Committees: Health Care (Chair), Higher Education, Ways & Means
- Website: Official

Randi L. Becker (born July 12, 1948) is an American politician of the Republican Party. She served as a member of the Washington Senate, representing the 2nd Legislative District from 2009 to 2021. She was first elected to the State Senate in 2008. In March 2020, Becker announced that she would not seek reelection to an additional term in the state Senate.

== Washington State Senate ==
Becker was first elected in 2008 with 51.6%. She was re-elected in 2012 with 56.8% and in 2016 with 61% of the vote.

=== Committee assignments ===
Becker was chair of the Health Care Committee. She also serves as a member of Higher Education and Ways & Means Committees.

=== Legislative activities ===
In her first term, Becker worked to improve the oversight and coordination between colleges. She also worked to standardize the length of yellow lights to ensure motorists don't get trapped and ticketed by short lights.

In March 2014, Becker was criticized for removing a provision of House Bill 2572 that would create an "all payer claims database," a transparency tool that would allow people to compare what health care actually costs and how well it turns out. An all payer claims database already exists or is being implemented in 16 other states and is supported in Washington by a broad coalition representing most health insurance purchasers, users, providers and health care policymakers, including small and large businesses, consumer advocates, tribes, hospitals, doctors, nurses, the governor, the insurance commissioner, the agency that governs insurance for state employees and the poor, and even most other health insurance companies. After the provision was removed, a Premera Blue Cross lobbyist publicly thanked Becker. Premera has been a vocal opponent of the all payer claims database in Washington.
