= Gary Alexander (politician) =

American politician

Member of the Washington House of Representatives from the 20th, Position 2 district
- In office January 3, 1997 – January 14, 2013
- Preceded by: Bill Brumsickle

Member of the Washington House of Representatives from the 2nd, Position 1 district
- In office January 14, 2013 – December 31, 2013 (Resigned)
- Preceded by: Jim McCune
- Succeeded by: Graham Hunt

Personal details
- Born: Seattle, Washington
- Party: Republican
- Spouse: Donna Alexander
- Children: 2
- Education: University of Washington, Pacific Lutheran University

Gary C. Alexander is an American politician of the Republican Party. He served as a member of the Washington House of Representatives, representing the 2nd district and, as of 2013, is the interim Auditor of Thurston County.

== Early life and education ==
Gary Alexander was born in Seattle. He graduated from the University of Washington with a degree in business statistics and received an MBA from Pacific Lutheran University.

== Career ==
In 1971, Alexander became a Finance Manager for State of Washington, until 1996.

Alexander entered the private sector, first as Chief Financial Officer for Behavioral Health Resources and then as a finance manager for Philip Services. From 1993 to 1996 Alexander served as a member of the Port of Olympia commission, the elected body responsible for managing port facilities in Thurston County.

=== Washington State Legislature ===
Alexander was first elected to the Washington House of Representatives from the 20th district in 1996 and has been reelected continuously since.

As a result of the Washington State Redistricting Commission, Alexander was pushed from his former District 20 into the District 2. On November 6, 2012, Alexander won the election and became a Republican member of Washington House of Representatives for District 2, Position 1. Alexander defeated Greg Hartman with 58.01% of the votes. Alexander began his term on January 14, 2013.

In 2013 Alexander announced his resignation, effective as of the end of that year. His committee assignments in his last legislative term included the Government Operations and Elections committee, and the Appropriations committee.

=== Thurston County Auditor ===
Alexander was hired as Deputy Auditor of Thurston County in 2001. In 2013, while still serving in the legislature, Alexander was appointed the county's interim Auditor to replace incumbent Kim Wyman, who had been elected Washington's Secretary of State. The following November Alexander stood for election to a full term as Auditor, narrowly losing to Democratic challenger Mary Hall.

=== Political views ===
Alexander was first elected to the legislature as a supporter of term limits, though he later renounced a pledge to serve no more than four terms.

While in the legislature, Alexander called for the licensing and taxation of slot machines in non-tribal casinos as a way to plug a shortfall in the state budget. He opposed the legalization of marijuana and same-sex marriage in Washington, measures that were approved by referendum in 2012.

Over the course of Alexander's various political campaigns he was endorsed by labor unions - including the Washington State Council of Fire Fighters and the Washington State Council of County and City Employees - as well more traditional backers of conservative candidates, such as the NRA Political Victory Fund and the Association of Washington Business. He has been described as a supporter of limited government and serves on the board of directors of Mainstream Republicans of Washington.

== Personal life ==
Alexander's wife is Donna Alexander. They have two children. Alexander and his family live in Olympia, Washington.

He serves on the board of directors of the Thurston County Boys and Girls Club and on the advisory board of the Pacific Lutheran University School of Business.
