= Timeline of Washington (state) history =

The following is a timeline of the history of Washington state in the United States.

== Pre-European ==
- 13,000–11,000 BCE - The Missoula floods inundate and scour large portions of the state from Eastern Washington to where the Columbia River enters the Pacific Ocean.
- 9,230 BCE - Human activity at Marmes Rockshelter begins.
- 7,000 - 6,900 BCE - Kennewick Man
- 3,800 - 2,000 BCE - Earliest evidence of human activity around Mount Rainier
- 500 BCE - Hoko River Site
- 1450 CE - Estimated date for the landslide that created the Bridge of the Gods which temporarily dammed the Columbia River where Bonneville Dam now stands.
- Various: Populated by indigenous tribes, such as the Cayuse, Chinook, Nez Percé, Quinault, Makah, Quileute, Snohomish, Spokane, and Yakama.

== 16th - 18th centuries ==
- 1592 - Ioánnis Fokás may have explored the Strait of Juan de Fuca.
- 1700 - January 26: An earthquake with an estimated moment magnitude of 8.7–9.2 strikes the region, causing damage to native settlements and sending a tsunami across the Pacific.
- 1774 - Juan José Pérez Hernández explores the Washington coast, naming present day Mount Olympus Cerro Nevado de Santa Rosalía.
- 1775 - Bruno de Heceta sights the Columbia River.
- 1778 - James Cook sails past Washington on his third voyage, sighting Cape Flattery.
- 1787 - Charles William Barkley discovers the Strait of Juan de Fuca and names it after the Spanish name of Ioánnis Fokás.
- 1790 - Manuel Quimper names the San Juan Islands while exploring the region for Spain.
- 1792
  - George Vancouver explores and names the Puget Sound. During this expedition, he also sighted and named several Cascade volcanoes and other geographic features.
  - Robert Gray explores and names the Columbia River.

== 19th century ==
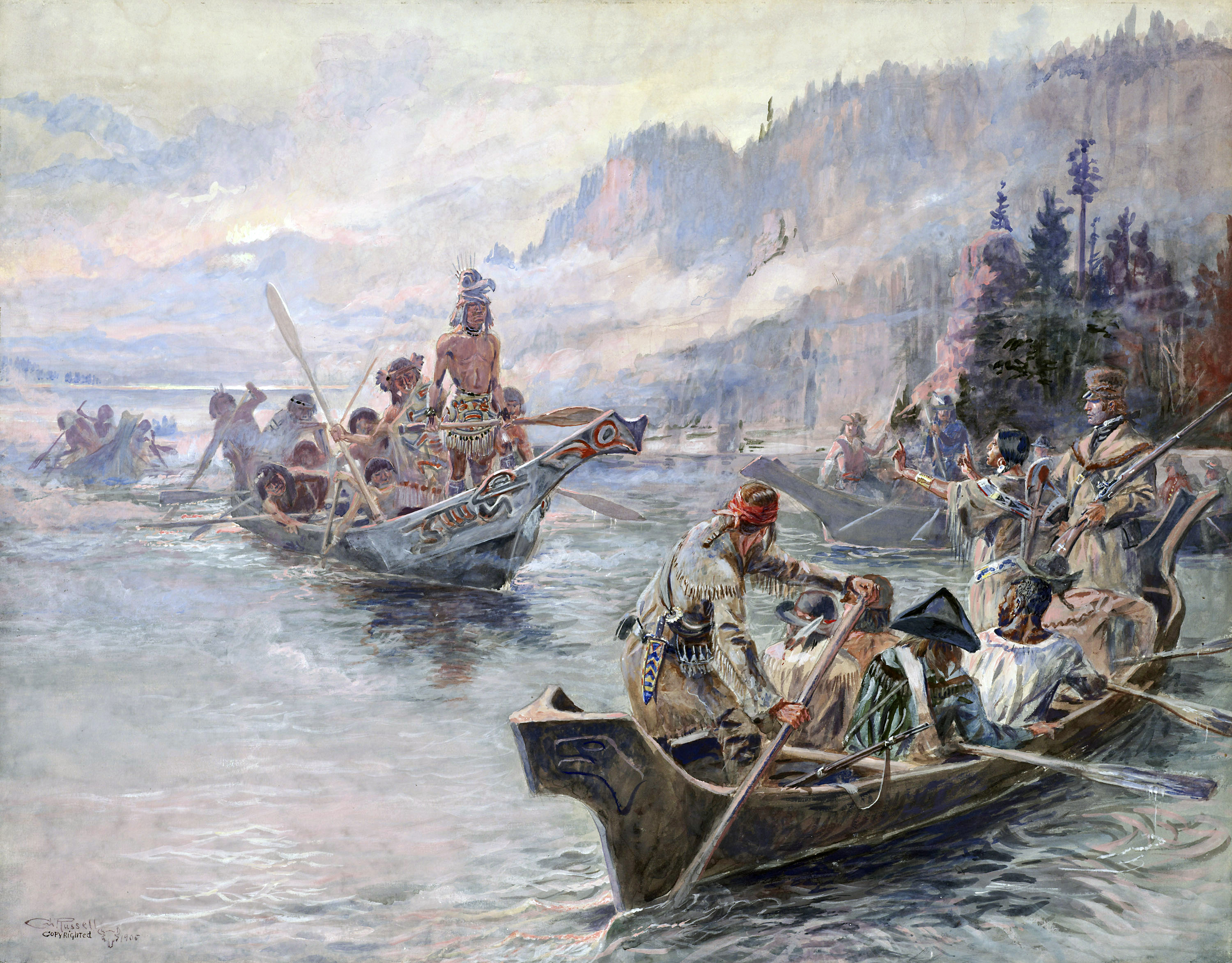
Corps of Discovery meet Chinooks on the Lower Columbia, October 1805 (Charles Marion Russel, c. 1905)

- 1805–1806 - The Lewis and Clark Expedition explores present day Washington along the Snake and Columbia Rivers.
- 1811 - David Thompson becomes the first European to navigate the entire length of the Columbia River.
- 1818: October 20 - The Treaty of 1818 is signed, allowing for joint occupation of Oregon Country (which included present day Washington) by the United Kingdom and United States.
- 1819: February 22 - The Adams-Onis Treaty is signed between the United States and Spain, which includes Spain withdrawing its claim to the Pacific Northwest.
- 1821: The North West Company merges with the Hudson's Bay Company with the latter becoming the British authority in what is now Washington.
- 1824: Fort Vancouver in the present day Washington city of the same name becomes the Hudson's Bay Company's Columbia District headquarters.
- 1843
  - Champoeg, a settlement in the Willamette Valley becomes the American capital of Oregon Country, which Washington was a part of at the time.
  - Hudson's Bay Company moves their Columbia District headquarters to Fort Victoria in the present day British Columbia city of the same name.
  - Oregon City becomes the American capital of Oregon Country.
- 1846 - June 15: The Oregon Treaty between the United Kingdom and United States is signed, setting the boundary between the two nations occupying Oregon Country at the 49th parallel and placing present day Washington in Oregon Territory.
- 1847 - November 29: Marcus Whitman and his wife Narcissa Whitman are killed by members of the Cayuse tribe near present-day Walla Walla in what is known as the Whitman massacre and triggering the Cayuse War.
- 1851
  - Salem becomes the capital of Oregon Territory.
  - November 13: The Denny Party founds present day Seattle.
- 1853 - March 2: Washington Territory splits from Oregon Territory, taking with it areas north of the Columbia River (west of Wallula Gap) and the 46th parallel. Olympia is established as the capital.
- 1855: June 9: Treaties between the United States and several Eastern Washington Native American tribes are signed at the Walla Walla Council.
- 1855–1856: The Puget Sound War is fought between the United States and several Native American tribes in the Puget Sound Region.
- 1855–1858: The Yakima War is fought between the United States and several Native American tribes in Central Washington.
- 1858: The Coeur d'Alene War is fought between the United States and several Native American tribes in Eastern Washington and the Idaho Panhandle.
- 1859
  - January 28: Olympia is incorporated.
  - February 14: Oregon is granted statehood with its present boundaries. The remaining portion of the territory to the east of the present state is added to Washington Territory.
  - June 15: An American settler on San Juan Island kills a pig owned by a British colonist, initiating military occupation of the island by both nations while peaceful negotiations between both nations determine the formal international boundary.

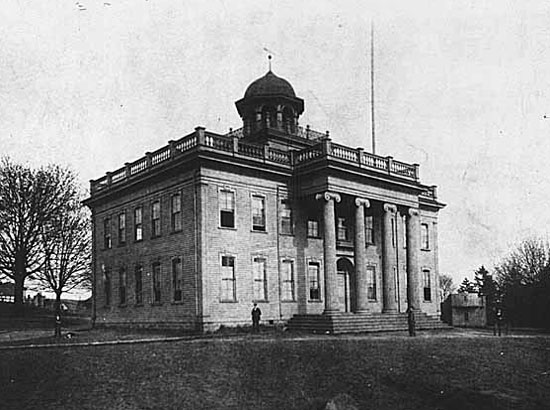
The original Washington Territorial University building, c. 1870.

- 1861
  - Washington Territorial University is established. It would later become the University of Washington.
  - March 2 - A portion of Washington Territory is ceded to Nebraska Territory as part of the act that creates Dakota Territory.
- 1863 - March 3: Washington is reduced to its present area with much of the eastern part of the territory becoming Idaho Territory.
- 1865 - Seattle is incorporated.
- 1870 - Hazard Stevens and P. B. Van Trump make the first documented successful ascent of Mount Rainier.
- 1871 - May 8: The Treaty of Washington is signed, determining the water boundary between the United States and United Kingdom in the San Juan Islands.
- 1873 - Spokane is founded.
- 1881 - Spokane is incorporated as Spokane Falls.
- 1887 - Gonzaga University is established in Spokane.
- 1889
  - June 6: The Great Seattle Fire is caused by an overturned glue pot.
  - July 4: The Great Ellensburg Fire destroys the city's downtown area.
  - August 4: The Great Spokane Fire destroys the city's downtown area.
  - November 11: Washington is admitted to the union as the 42nd U.S. state.
- 1890 - Washington State College was established and was later renamed Washington State University.

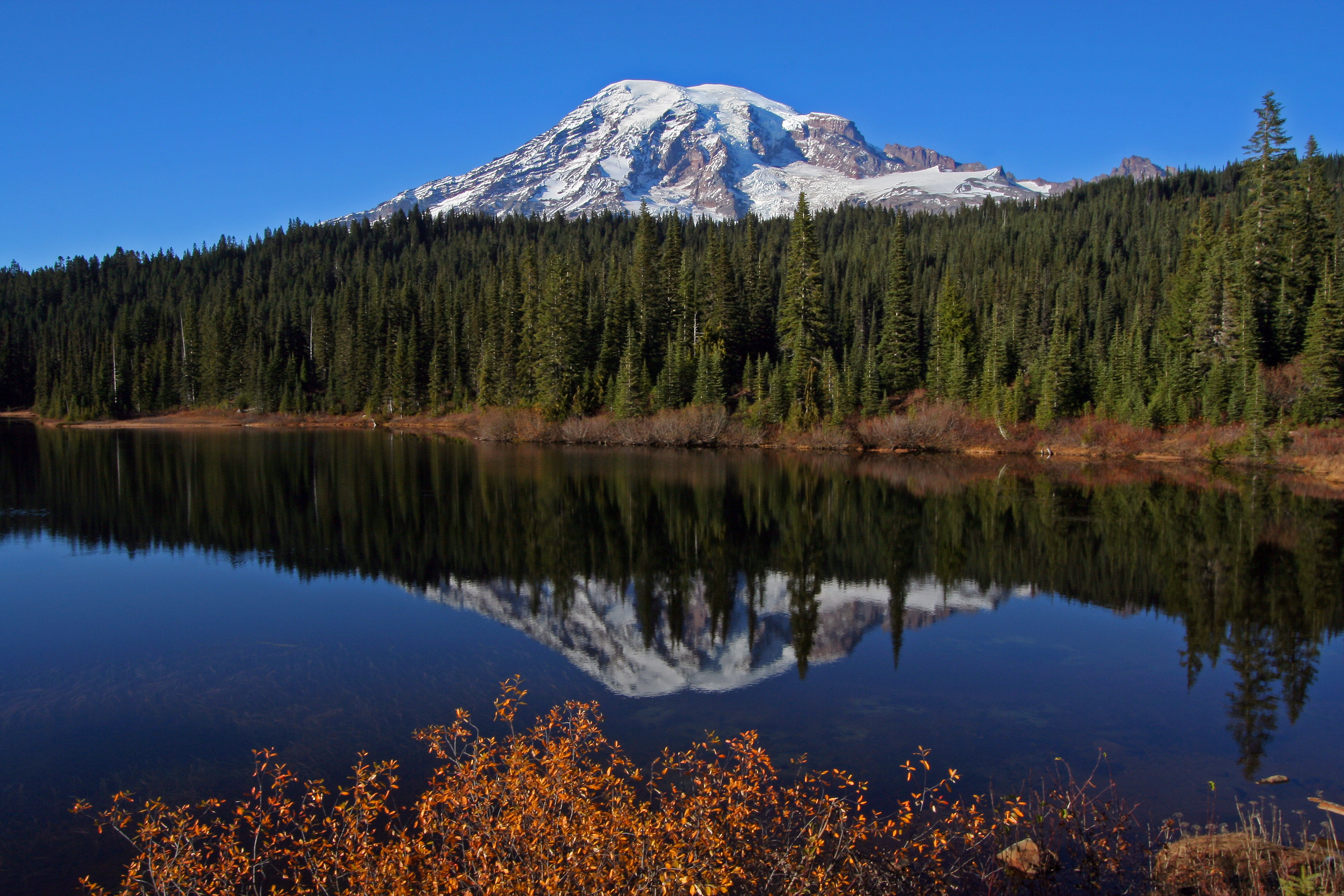
Mount Rainier from Reflection Lake.

- 1899 - March 2: Mount Rainier National Park is established as the first national park in Washington.

== 20th century ==
=== 1900s to 1940s ===
- 1905: Washington becomes the nation's largest lumber producer.
- 1907 - August 17: Pike Place Market, one of the most visited tourist attractions in the world, opens in Seattle.
- 1908: The first railroad bridge is built across the Columbia River.
- 1910
  - The U.S. Census notes Washington as having over a million residents for the first time.
  - Women are granted the right to vote in Washington.. They had briefly enjoyed this right in the 1880s before Washington gained statehood.
  - March 1: The Wellington Train Disaster, an avalanche near Stevens Pass kills 96 people, making it the deadliest avalanche in U.S. history.
- 1913 - The Washington state parks system is established.
- 1916 - July 15: The Boeing Company is established in the state as Pacific Aero Products Company.
- 1922 - J Harlen Bretz first proposes his Missoula floods hypothesis, which he termed Spokane floods.
- 1923 - March 5: The Washington state flag is adopted. It would receive minor revisions in 1967.
- 1926
  - Bertha Knight Landes is elected mayor of Seattle. She was the first female mayor of a major American city.
  - April 6: The first civilian air mail flight in the United States departs Pasco for Boise, Idaho and Elko, Nevada operated by Varney Air Lines.
- 1936 - July 15: The State Line earthquake, centered near Milton-Freewater, Oregon, impacts Eastern Washington.
- 1938 - June 29: Olympic National Park is established.
- 1940 - November 7: The Tacoma Narrows Bridge collapses in high winds just months after opening.
- 1942 - June 1: Grand Coulee Dam opens after nearly nine years of construction.

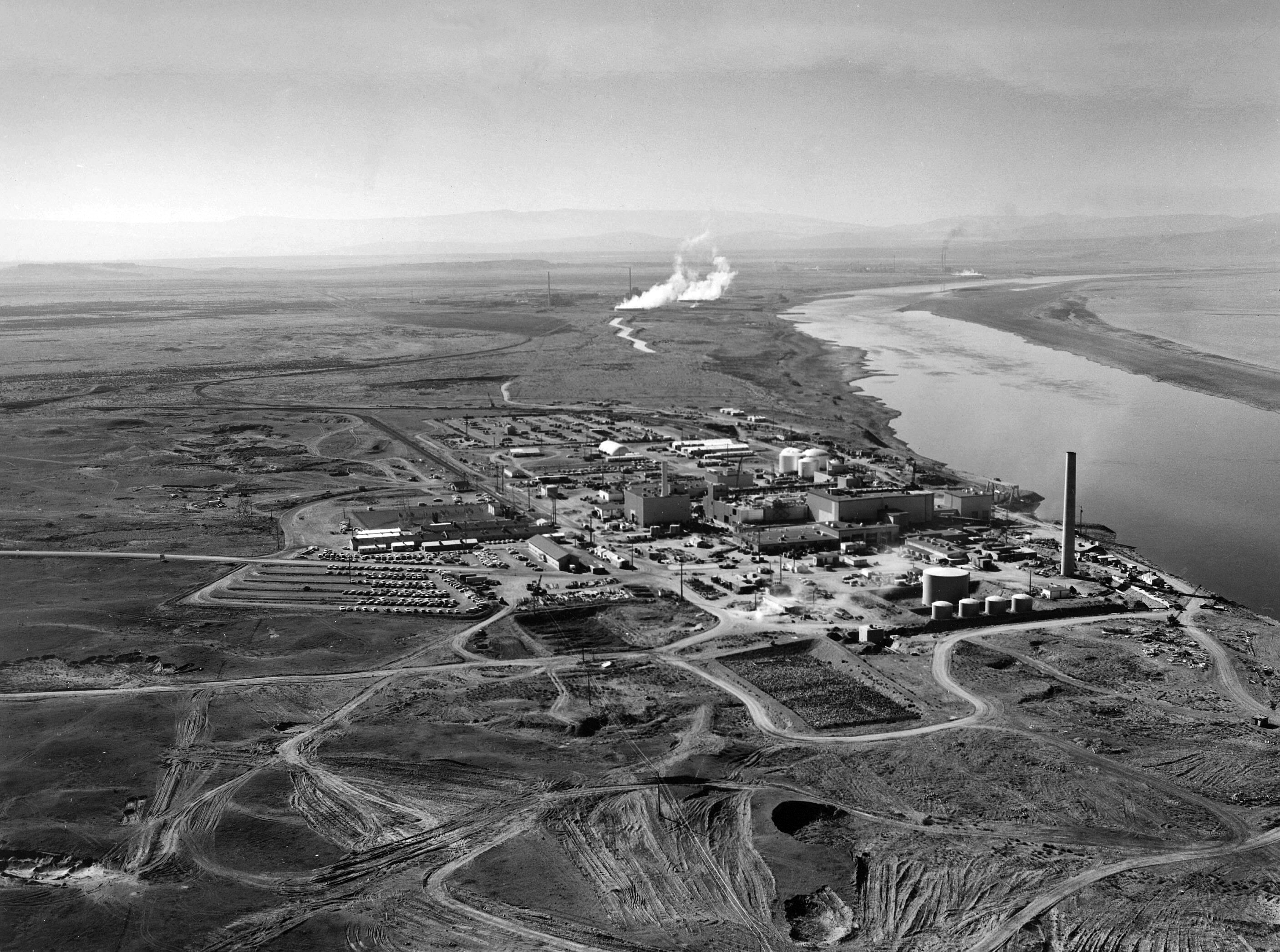
Several of the reactors on the Hanford Site.

- 1943 - February 9: Selection of the Hanford Site is approved as part of the Manhattan Project, encompassing Richland, a large part of Benton, and smaller portions of Grant and Franklin Counties to the north of town.
- 1944 - September: The B Reactor on the Hanford Site is completed, becoming the first large-scale nuclear reactor in the world.
- 1945
  - May 7: Plutonium from the Hanford Site is used at the Trinity Site near Socorro, New Mexico in the world's first test of a nuclear bomb.
  - August 9: Plutonium from the Hanford Site is used in Fat Man, the bomb detonated over the Japanese city of Nagasaki.
- 1947 - July 9: Seattle-Tacoma International Airport opens.

=== 1950s to 1990s ===
- 1951 - June 1: Washington State Ferries, a state run ferry service in the Puget Sound and Salish Sea is established. Prior to this, ferries in the region had been operated by private companies.
- 1960 - Seattle becomes the first city in the state to exceed 500,000 people.
- 1961 - December 8: The Space Needle is completed in Seattle.
- 1962
  - April 21: Seattle opens the Century 21 Exposition, and the Space Needle officially opens.
  - October 12: The Columbus Day Storm of 1962 (which was a remnant of Typhoon Freda) strikes the Pacific Northwest, producing wind gusts up to 100 mph (160 km/h) in the Tacoma area.
- 1965 - April 29: A M_{w} 6.7 earthquake centered 59 kilometres (37 mi) below Des Moines strikes the Puget Sound region.
- 1968 - October 2: North Cascades National Park is established.
- 1971 - March 30: The first Starbucks opens in Seattle.

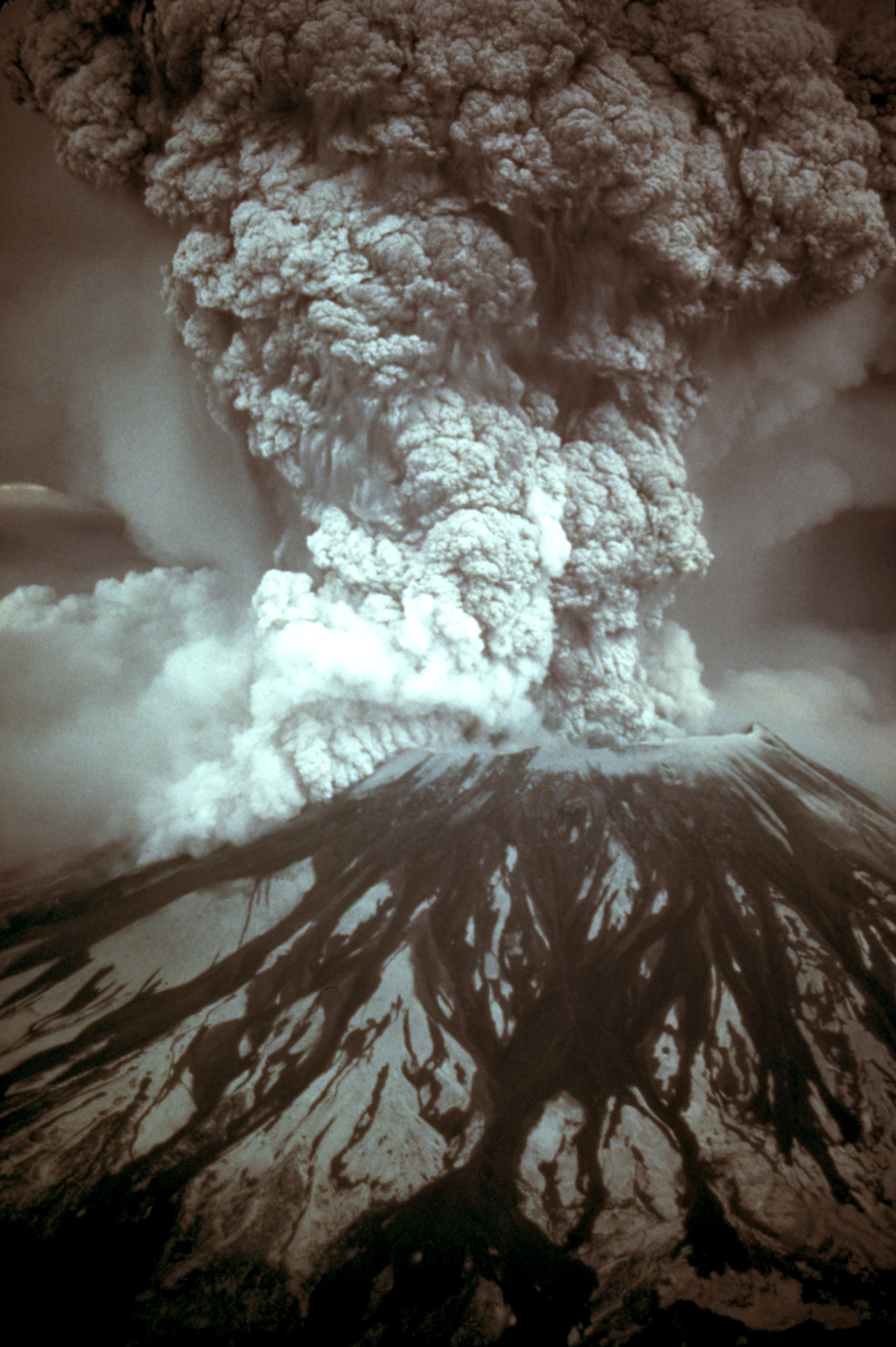
Mount St. Helens erupting

- 1974
  - Spokane hosts Expo '74.
  - June: The Seattle Seahawks are formed, beginning play in 1976.
- 1977 - April 6: The Seattle Mariners play their first game.
- 1979 - January: Microsoft moves its headquarters to Bellevue.
- 1980 - May 18: After several months of unrest, Mount St. Helens experiences a major volcanic eruption.
- 1982
  - July 16: Washington's Lottery is established.
  - August 27: Mount St. Helens National Volcanic Monument is established.
- 1994 - July 5: Cadabra, Inc. is incorporated. It would later be renamed Amazon.

== 2000–present ==
- 2000 - June 8: Hanford Reach National Monument is established in the former security buffer of the Hanford Site.
- 2001 - February 28: A M_{w} 6.8 earthquake centered 57 kilometres (35 mi) below the Puget Sound between Olympia and Seattle strikes the Puget Sound region.
- 2004
  - October 1: Mount St. Helens erupts. Eruptive activity would last until January 2008.
  - October 4: Washington State Digital Archives is open as the nation's first archives built to preserve electronic State records.
- 2006 - December 14–15: The Hanukkah Eve storm produces hurricane-force winds and cuts power to 1.2 million customers across the state.
- 2012 - December 6: Washington becomes the first state to legalize recreational use of cannabis.
- 2013 - March 25: San Juan Islands National Monument is established.
- 2014 - March 22: A mudslide engulfs the rural community of Oso, killing 43 and destroying nearly 50 structures.
- 2015 - September 14: Scientists at the Laser Interferometer Gravitational-Wave Observatory (LIGO) on the Hanford Site and in Livingston, Louisiana detect gravity waves for the first time.
- 2020 - January 21: Washington reports the United States' first case of COVID-19. Washington would record the nation's first death from the disease the following month.
- 2021 - June & July: The 2021 Western North America heat wave kills 91 people in Washington, making it the state's second deadliest natural disaster on record.

== See also ==
- List of Washington state legislatures
- Timeline of Seattle
- Timeline of Spokane, Washington
- Timeline of the Tri-Cities, Washington
