= Marilyn Rasmussen =

American politician

Member of the Washington Senate from the 2nd district
- In office January 11, 1993 – January 11, 2009
- Preceded by: Ken Madsen
- Succeeded by: Randi Becker

Member of the Washington House of Representatives from the 2nd, Position 1 district
- In office January 12, 1987 – January 11, 1993
- Preceded by: Wayne Ehlers
- Succeeded by: Tom Campbell

Personal details
- Born: March 10, 1939 (age 87) Seattle, Washington, U.S.
- Party: Democratic
- Education: University of Washington (attended)

Marilyn J. Rasmussen (born March 10, 1939) is an American farmer and politician who served as a member of the Washington State Senate, representing the 2nd district from 1993 to 2009. A member of the Democratic Party, she previously served as a member of the Washington House of Representatives from 1987 to 1993.
