= Charles W. Hodde =

American politician

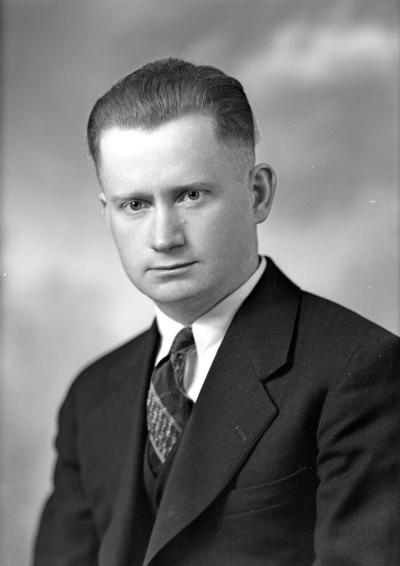
- Hodde in 1937

29th Speaker of the Washington House of Representatives
- In office January 10, 1949 – January 12, 1953
- Preceded by: Herbert M. Hamblen
- Succeeded by: R. Mort Frayn

Member of the Washington House of Representatives for the 2nd district
- In office 1937–1939; 1943–1953

Personal details
- Born: July 30, 1906 Missouri, United States
- Died: June 27, 1999 (aged 92) Thurston County, Washington, United States
- Party: Democratic

Charles William Hodde (July 30, 1906 – June 27, 1999) was an American politician in the state of Washington. He served in the Washington House of Representatives from 1937 to 1939 and from 1943 to 1953. He was Speaker of the House from 1949 to 1953.
