= Washington's 49th legislative district =

American legislative district

Coordinates: 45.65°N 122.67°W

Map of Washington's 49th legislative district

Washington's 49th legislative district is one of forty-nine districts in Washington state for representation in the state legislature. The district is in Clark County and covers most of Vancouver, the state's fourth-largest city and a major suburb of Portland, Oregon, and portions of Ridgefield and Camas.

The district's legislators are state senator Annette Cleveland and state representatives Sharon Wylie (position 1) and Monica Stonier (position 2), all Democrats.

== See also ==
- Washington Redistricting Commission
- Washington State Legislature
- Washington State Senate
- Washington House of Representatives
