= 2018 Washington State Senate election =

Washington State Senate elections, 2018
- November 6, 2018

25 of 49 seats in the Washington State Senate 25 seats needed for a majority
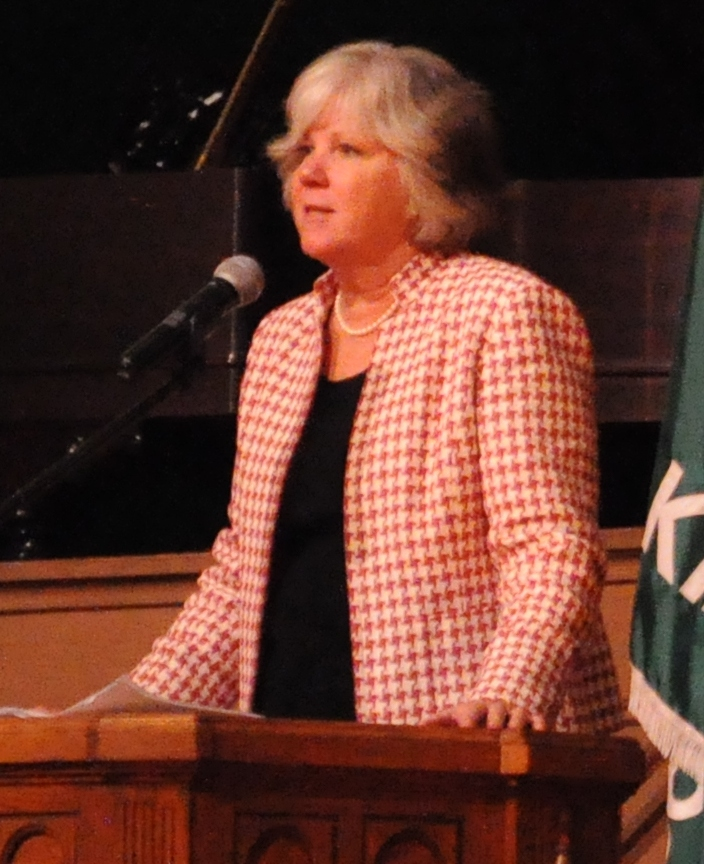

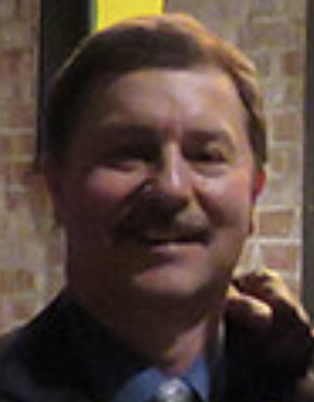
	Majority party	Minority party
Leader	Sharon Nelson	Mark Schoesler
Party	Democratic	Republican
Leader's seat	34th-Maury Island	9th-Ritzville
Last election	24 (Note: One Democrat, Tim Sheldon, caucuses with the Republicans, which gave them majority control from 2013 to November 2017, and is counted in the Republican seats)	25
Seats before	25	24
Seats won	28	21
Seat change	▲3	▼3
Popular vote	982,741	516,476
Percentage	64.55%	33.92%
Swing	▲18.73 pp	▼16.94 pp
- Results: Democratic gain Democratic hold Republican hold Democrat caucusing with Republicans hold No election
Majority Leader before election
Mark Schoesler
Republican (Coalition)
Elected Majority Leader
Sharon Nelson
Democratic

The 2018 Washington State Senate elections took place as part of the biennial United States elections. Washington state voters elected state senators in 25 of the state's 49 Senate districts. The other 24 state senators were not up for re-election until the next biennial election in 2020. State senators serve four-year terms in the Washington State Senate. A statewide map of Washington's state legislative districts is provided by the Washington State Legislature here,.

A top two primary election on August 7, 2018, determined which candidates appear on the November 6 general election ballot. Each candidate is allowed to write in their party preference so that it appears as they desire on the ballot.

Following the 2016 state senate elections, Republicans maintained effective control of the Senate, 25–24 because self-identified Democrat Tim Sheldon caucuses with the Republicans. However, in 2017 Democrats regained control of the Washington State Senate after Democrat Manka Dhingra won a special election in Washington's 45th legislative district.

Democrats expanded their caucus's majority to 28–21 by further flipping the 26th, 30th, and 47th districts. Tim Sheldon was reelected as a Democrat, but continued to caucus with the Republicans.

== Overview ==
2018 Washington State Senate election Primary election — August 7, 2018
Party	Votes	Percentage	Candidates	Advancing to general	Seats contesting
Democratic	536,781	61.87%	37	28	24
Republican	302,667	34.89%	26	19	19
Independent	15,375	1.77%	6	1	1
Libertarian	9,998	1.15%	4	1	1
No party preference	2,737	0.32%	2	0	0
Totals	2,869,914	100.00%	75	49	—

2018 Washington State Senate election General election — November 6, 2018
Party	Votes	Percentage	Not up	Contested	Before	After	+/–
Democratic	982,741	64.55%	10	7	25	28	▲3
Republican	516,476	33.92%	12	11	24	21	▼3
Independent	13,538	0.89%	0	0	0	0	0
Libertarian	9,707	0.64%	0	0	0	0	0
Totals	1,522,462	100.00%	24	25	49	49	—

== Predictions ==
Source	Ranking	As of
Governing	Likely D	October 8, 2018

== Summary of results by State Senate district ==
- Districts not shown are not up for election until 2020.

** Incumbent did not seek re-election.

State Senate district	Incumbent	Party	Elected senator	Party
6th	Michael Baumgartner**	Rep	Jeff Holy	Rep
7th	Shelly Short	Rep	Shelly Short	Rep
8th	Sharon Brown	Rep	Sharon Brown	Rep
13th	Judy Warnick	Rep	Judy Warnick	Rep
15th	Jim Honeyford	Rep	Jim Honeyford	Rep
21st	Marko Liias	Dem	Marko Liias	Dem
26th	Jan Angel**	Rep	Emily Randall	Dem
29th	Steve Conway	Dem	Steve Conway	Dem
30th	Mark Miloscia	Rep	Claire Wilson	Dem
31st	Phil Fortunato	Rep	Phil Fortunato	Rep
32nd	Maralyn Chase	Dem	Jesse Salomon	Dem
33rd	Karen Keiser	Dem	Karen Keiser	Dem
34th	Sharon Nelson**	Dem	Joe Nguyen	Dem
35th	Tim Sheldon	Dem*	Tim Sheldon	Dem*
36th	Reuven Carlyle	Dem	Reuven Carlyle	Dem
37th	Rebecca Saldaña	Dem	Rebecca Saldaña	Dem
38th	John McCoy	Dem	John McCoy	Dem
39th	Keith Wagoner	Rep	Keith Wagoner	Rep
42nd	Doug Ericksen	Rep	Doug Ericksen	Rep
43rd	Jamie Pedersen	Dem	Jamie Pedersen	Dem
44th	Steve Hobbs	Dem	Steve Hobbs	Dem
45th	Manka Dhingra	Dem	Manka Dhingra	Dem
46th	David Frockt	Dem	David Frockt	Dem
47th	Joe Fain	Rep	Mona Das	Dem
48th	Patty Kuderer	Dem	Patty Kuderer	Dem

*Tim Sheldon self-identifies as a Democrat but caucuses with the Republicans.

== See also ==
- 2018 United States elections
- 2018 United States House of Representatives elections in Washington
- 2018 United States Senate election in Washington
- 2018 Washington House of Representatives election
