= 2022 Washington State Senate election =

Washington State Senate elections, 2022
- November 8, 2022

25 of 49 seats in the Washington State Senate 25 seats needed for a majority

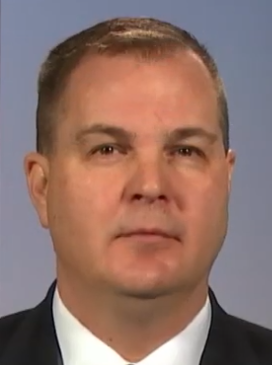
	Majority party	Minority party
Leader	Andy Billig	John Braun
Party	Democratic	Republican
Leader's seat	33rd-Des Moines	20th-Centralia
Seats before	28 (Note: Retiring Democrat Tim Sheldon caucused with the Republicans and is therefore counted towards the Republican seats.)	21
Seats won	29	20
Seat change	▲1	▼1
Popular vote	793,534	548,781
Percentage	56.81%	39.29%
Swing	▲7.22 pp	▼8.13 pp
- Democratic gain Republican gain Democratic hold Republican hold No election 50–60% 60–70% 70–80% 80–90% >90% 50–60% 60–70% 70–80% >90%
Majority Leader before election
Andy Billig
Democratic
Elected Majority Leader
Andy Billig
Democratic

The 2022 Washington State Senate elections took place as part of the biennial United States elections. Washington state voters elected state senators in 25 of the state's 49 Senate districts. The other 24 state senators were not up for re-election until the next biennial election in 2024. State senators served four-year terms in the Washington State Senate.

A top two primary election in August 2022 determined which candidates would appear on the November 6 general election ballot. Each candidate was allowed to write in their party preference so that it appeared as they desired on the ballot.

Following the 2020 state senate elections, Democrats maintained control of the Senate, 28–21. Senators Sharon Brown (R), Reuven Carlyle (D), Mona Das (D), David Frockt (D), Jim Honeyford (R), and Tim Sheldon (D-MCC) were not seeking re-election. Additionally, Senator Jeannie Darneille (D) retired early, and her seat was up for election this cycle.

== Predictions ==
Source	Ranking	As of
Sabato's Crystal Ball	Safe D	May 19, 2022

== Summary of results by State Senate district ==
- Districts not listed were not up for election in 2022.
  ** Incumbent did not seek re-election.

State Senate district	Incumbent	Party	Elected Senator	Party
6th	Jeff Holy	Rep	Jeff Holy	Rep
7th	Shelly Short	Rep	Shelly Short	Rep
8th	**Sharon Brown	Rep	Matt Boehnke	Rep
13th	Judy Warnick	Rep	Judy Warnick	Rep
15th	**Jim Honeyford	Rep	Nikki Torres	Rep
21st	Marko Liias	Dem	Marko Liias	Dem
26th	Emily Randall	Dem	Emily Randall	Dem
27th Special	**Jeannie Darneille	Dem	Yasmin Trudeau	Dem
29th	Steve Conway	Dem	Steve Conway	Dem
30th	Claire Wilson	Dem	Claire Wilson	Dem
31st	Phil Fortunato	Rep	Phil Fortunato	Rep
32nd	Jesse Salomon	Dem	Jesse Salomon	Dem
33rd	Karen Keiser	Dem	Karen Keiser	Dem
34th	Joe Nguyen	Dem	Joe Nguyen	Dem
35th	**Tim Sheldon	Dem*	Drew MacEwen	Rep
36th	**Reuven Carlyle	Dem	Noel Frame	Dem
37th	Rebecca Saldaña	Dem	Rebecca Saldaña	Dem
38th	June Robinson	Dem	June Robinson	Dem
42nd	Simon Sefzik	Rep	Sharon Shewmake	Dem
43rd	Jamie Pedersen	Dem	Jamie Pedersen	Dem
44th	John Lovick	Dem	John Lovick	Dem
45th	Manka Dhingra	Dem	Manka Dhingra	Dem
46th	**David Frockt	Dem	Javier Valdez	Dem
47th	**Mona Das	Dem	Claudia Kauffman	Dem
48th	Patty Kuderer	Dem	Patty Kuderer	Dem

== Detailed results ==
=== District 6 ===
Washington's 6th State Senate District, 2022
Primary election
Party	Candidate	Votes	%
Republican	Jeff Holy (incumbent)	26,707	94.18
Write-in		1650	5.82
Total votes		28,357	100.0
General election
Republican	Jeff Holy (incumbent)	42,277	94.51
Write-in		2456	5.49
Total votes		44,733	100.0
Republican hold			

=== District 7 ===
Washington's 7th State Senate District, 2022
Primary election
Party	Candidate	Votes	%
Republican	Shelly Short (incumbent)	33,274	96.31
Write-in		1274	3.69
Total votes		34,548	100.0
General election
Republican	Shelly Short (incumbent)	51,661	96.93
Write-in		1638	3.07
Total votes		53,299	100.0
Republican hold			

=== District 8 ===
Washington's 8th State Senate District, 2022
Primary election
Party	Candidate	Votes	%
Republican	Matt Boehnke	23,939	67.16
Independent	Ronni Batchelor	8,627	24.20
Republican	Alex Barrington	2,917	8.18
Write-in		163	0.46
Total votes		35,646	100.0
General election
Republican	Matt Boehnke	40,808	71.70
Independent	Ronni Batchelor	15,960	28.04
Write-in		143	0.25
Total votes		56,911	100.0
Republican hold			

=== District 13 ===
Washington's 13th State Senate District, 2022
Primary election
Party	Candidate	Votes	%
Republican	Judy Warnick (incumbent)	26,084	97.54
Write-in		659	2.46
Total votes		26,743	100.0
General election
Republican	Judy Warnick (incumbent)	41,785	97.11
Write-in		1242	2.89
Total votes		43,027	100.0
Republican hold			

=== District 15 ===
Washington's 15th State Senate District, 2022
Primary election
Party	Candidate	Votes	%
Republican	Nikki Torres	10,334	94.25
Write-in		630	5.75
Total votes		10,964	100.0
General election
Republican	Nikki Torres	15,686	67.68
Democratic	Lindsey Keesling (Note: Democrat Lindsey Keesling received enough write-in votes in the primary to be listed on the general election ballot.)	7,437	32.09
Write-in		55	0.24
Total votes		23,178	100.0
Republican hold			

=== District 21 ===
Washington's 21st State Senate District, 2022
Primary election
Party	Candidate	Votes	%
Democratic	Marko Liias (incumbent)	21,645	62.68
Republican	Janelle Cass	12,821	37.13
Write-in		66	0.19
Total votes		34,532	100.0
General election
Democratic	Marko Liias (incumbent)	36,363	63.25
Republican	Janelle Cass	21,069	36.65
Write-in		60	0.10
Total votes		57,492	100.0
Democratic hold			

=== District 26 ===
Washington's 26th State Senate District, 2022
Primary election
Party	Candidate	Votes	%
Democratic	Emily Randall (incumbent)	25,850	51.52
Republican	Jesse L. Young	22,257	44.36
Republican	David Crissman	2,031	4.05
Write-in		37	0.07
Total votes		50,175	100.0
General election
Democratic	Emily Randall (incumbent)	38,222	50.79
Republican	Jesse L. Young	36,946	49.09
Write-in		93	0.12
Total votes		75,261	100.0
Democratic hold			

=== District 27 ===
Washington's 27th State Senate District, 2022
Primary election
Party	Candidate	Votes	%
Democratic	Yasmin Trudeau	24,633	70.26
Republican	Ashley M. Ray	6,461	18.43
Republican	Mike Stewart	3,925	11.20
Write-in		41	0.12
Total votes		35,060	100.0
General election
Democratic	Yasmin Trudeau	41,035	70.54
Republican	Ashley M. Ray	17,074	29.35
Write-in		60	0.10
Total votes		58,169	100.0
Democratic hold			

=== District 29 ===
Washington's 29th State Senate District, 2022
Primary election
Party	Candidate	Votes	%
Democratic	Steve Conway (incumbent)	12,516	58.52
Republican	Terry Harder	8,808	41.18
Write-in		63	0.29
Total votes		21,387	100.0
General election
Democratic	Steve Conway (incumbent)	22,622	59.03
Republican	Terry Harder	15,631	40.79
Write-in		70	0.18
Total votes		38,323	100.0
Democratic hold			

=== District 30 ===
Washington's 30th State Senate District, 2022
Primary election
Party	Candidate	Votes	%
Democratic	Claire Wilson (incumbent)	13,596	54.10
Republican	Linda Kochmar	9,229	36.73
Republican	Mark W. Christie	2,267	9.02
Write-in		38	0.15
Total votes		25,130	100.0
General election
Democratic	Claire Wilson (incumbent)	23,282	55.21
Republican	Linda Kochmar	18,833	44.66
Write-in		53	0.13
Total votes		42,168	100.0
Democratic hold			

=== District 31 ===
Washington's 31st State Senate District, 2022
Primary election
Party	Candidate	Votes	%
Republican	Phil Fortunato (incumbent)	20,491	55.38
Independent	Chris Vance	14,469	39.11
Independent	Clifford Knopik	1,735	4.69
Write-in		304	0.82
Total votes		36,999	100.0
General election
Republican	Phil Fortunato (incumbent)	35,764	55.81
Independent	Chris Vance	28,053	43.78
Write-in		263	0.41
Total votes		64,080	100.0
Republican hold			

=== District 32 ===
Washington's 32nd State Senate District, 2022
Primary election
Party	Candidate	Votes	%
Democratic	Jesse Salomon (incumbent)	24,232	65.39
Democratic	Patricia Weber	7,134	19.25
Independent	Evelyn Anthony	5,303	14.31
Write-in		386	1.04
Total votes		37,055	100.0
General election
Democratic	Jesse Salomon (incumbent)	43,240	74.82
Democratic	Patricia Weber	13,159	22.77
Write-in		1396	2.42
Total votes		57,795	100.0
Democratic hold			

=== District 33 ===
Washington's 33rd State Senate District, 2022
Primary election
Party	Candidate	Votes	%
Democratic	Karen Keiser (incumbent)	18,985	92.05
Write-in		1639	7.95
Total votes		20,624	100.0
General election
Democratic	Karen Keiser (incumbent)	30,332	69.12
Republican	Marliza Melzer (Note: Republican Marliza Melzer received enough write-in votes in the primary to be listed on the general election ballot.)	13,486	30.73
Write-in		63	0.14
Total votes		43,881	100.0
Democratic hold			

=== District 34 ===
Washington's 34th State Senate District, 2022
Primary election
Party	Candidate	Votes	%
Democratic	Joe Nguyen (incumbent)	35,911	83.29
Republican	John Potter	4,289	9.95
Independent	Amber Bennett	2,257	5.23
Republican	GoodSpaceGuy	355	0.82
Independent	Tony Mitchum	252	0.58
Write-in		50	0.12
Total votes		43,114	100.0
General election
Democratic	Joe Nguyen (incumbent)	59,713	86.06
Republican	John Potter	9,570	13.79
Write-in		105	0.15
Total votes		69,388	100.0
Democratic hold			

=== District 35 ===
Washington's 35th State Senate District, 2022
Primary election
Party	Candidate	Votes	%
Republican	Drew MacEwen	27,174	54.96
Democratic	Julianne Gale	22,211	44.92
Write-in		57	0.12
Total votes		49,442	100.0
General election
Republican	Drew MacEwen	41,828	56.06
Democratic	Julianne Gale	32,705	43.84
Write-in		74	0.10
Total votes		74,607	100.0
Republican gain from Majority Coalition Caucus			

=== District 36 ===
Washington's 36th State Senate District, 2022
Primary election
Party	Candidate	Votes	%
Democratic	Noel Frame	35,090	82.06
Democratic	Kate Martin	7,261	16.98
Write-in		409	0.96
Total votes		42,760	100.0
General election
Democratic	Noel Frame	61,783	83.60
Democratic	Kate Martin	11,700	15.83
Write-in		421	0.57
Total votes		73,904	100.0
Democratic hold			

=== District 37 ===
Washington's 37th State Senate District, 2022
Primary election
Party	Candidate	Votes	%
Democratic	Rebecca Saldaña (incumbent)	29,413	97.86
Write-in		642	2.14
Total votes		30,055	100.0
General election
Democratic	Rebecca Saldaña (incumbent)	49,271	98.45
Write-in		776	1.55
Total votes		50,047	100.0
Democratic hold			

=== District 38 ===
Washington's 38th State Senate District, 2022
Primary election
Party	Candidate	Votes	%
Democratic	June Robinson (incumbent)	17,733	57.68
Republican	Bernard Moody	9,199	29.92
Republican	Anita Azariah	3,771	12.27
Write-in		40	0.13
Total votes		30,743	100.0
General election
Democratic	June Robinson (incumbent)	30,093	58.10
Republican	Bernard Moody	21,627	41.76
Write-in		73	0.14
Total votes		51,793	100.0
Democratic hold			

=== District 42 ===
Washington's 42nd State Senate District, 2022
Primary election
Party	Candidate	Votes	%
Democratic	Sharon Shewmake	24,497	47.07
Republican	Simon Sefzik (incumbent)	17,248	33.14
Republican	Ben Elenbaas	10,277	19.75
Write-in		21	0.04
Total votes		52,043	100.0
General election
Democratic	Sharon Shewmake	38,098	50.55
Republican	Simon Sefzik (incumbent)	37,193	49.35
Write-in		75	0.10
Total votes		75,366	100.0
Democratic gain from Republican			

=== District 43 ===
Washington's 43rd State Senate District, 2022
Primary election
Party	Candidate	Votes	%
Democratic	Jamie Pedersen (incumbent)	30,299	97.93
Write-in		640	2.07
Total votes		30,939	100.0
General election
Democratic	Jamie Pedersen (incumbent)	50,957	98.55
Write-in		751	1.45
Total votes		51,708	100.0
Democratic hold			

=== District 44 ===
Washington's 44th State Senate District, 2022
Primary election
Party	Candidate	Votes	%
Democratic	John Lovick (incumbent)	21,773	58.28
Republican	Jeb Brewer	15,542	41.60
Write-in		42	0.11
Total votes		37,357	100.0
General election
Democratic	John Lovick (incumbent)	37,226	58.77
Republican	Jeb Brewer	26,062	41.14
Write-in		59	0.09
Total votes		63,347	100.0
Democratic hold			

=== District 45 ===
Washington's 45th State Senate District, 2022
Primary election
Party	Candidate	Votes	%
Democratic	Manka Dhingra (incumbent)	25,773	65.40
Republican	Ryika Hooshangi	13,570	34.43
Write-in		65	0.16
Total votes		39,408	100.0
General election
Democratic	Manka Dhingra (incumbent)	41,391	62.87
Republican	Ryika Hooshangi	24,354	36.99
Write-in		86	0.13
Total votes		65,831	100.0
Democratic hold			

=== District 46 ===
Washington's 46th State Senate District, 2022
Primary election
Party	Candidate	Votes	%
Democratic	Javier Valdez	34,984	83.01
Democratic	Matthew Gross	5,150	12.22
Standup-America Party	Alex Tsimerman	1,784	4.23
Write-in		224	0.53
Total votes		42,142	100.0
General election
Democratic	Javier Valdez	55,915	84.89
Democratic	Matthew Gross	9,531	14.47
Write-in		420	0.64
Total votes		65,866	100.0
Democratic hold			

=== District 47 ===
Washington's 47th State Senate District, 2022
Primary election
Party	Candidate	Votes	%
Republican	Bill Boyce	13,734	45.54
Democratic	Claudia Kauffman	8,222	27.26
Democratic	Satwinder Kaur	8,157	27.05
Write-in		46	0.15
Total votes		30,159	100.0
General election
Democratic	Claudia Kauffman	26,251	52.70
Republican	Bill Boyce	23,502	47.19
Write-in		55	0.11
Total votes		49,808	100.0
Democratic hold			

=== District 48 ===
Washington's 48th State Senate District, 2022
Primary election
Party	Candidate	Votes	%
Democratic	Patty Kuderer (incumbent)	19,389	71.39
Republican	Michelle Darnell	7,717	28.41
Write-in		54	0.20
Total votes		27,160	100.0
General election
Democratic	Patty Kuderer (incumbent)	33,208	70.58
Republican	Michelle Darnell	13,795	29.32
Write-in		50	0.11
Total votes		47,053	100.0
Democratic hold			

== See also ==
- 2022 United States elections
- 2022 United States House of Representatives elections in Washington
- 2022 United States Senate election in Washington
- 2022 Washington House of Representatives election
