= 2026 Washington State Senate election =

Washington State Senate elections, 2026
- November 3, 2026

24 of 49 seats in the Washington State Senate 25 seats needed for a majority
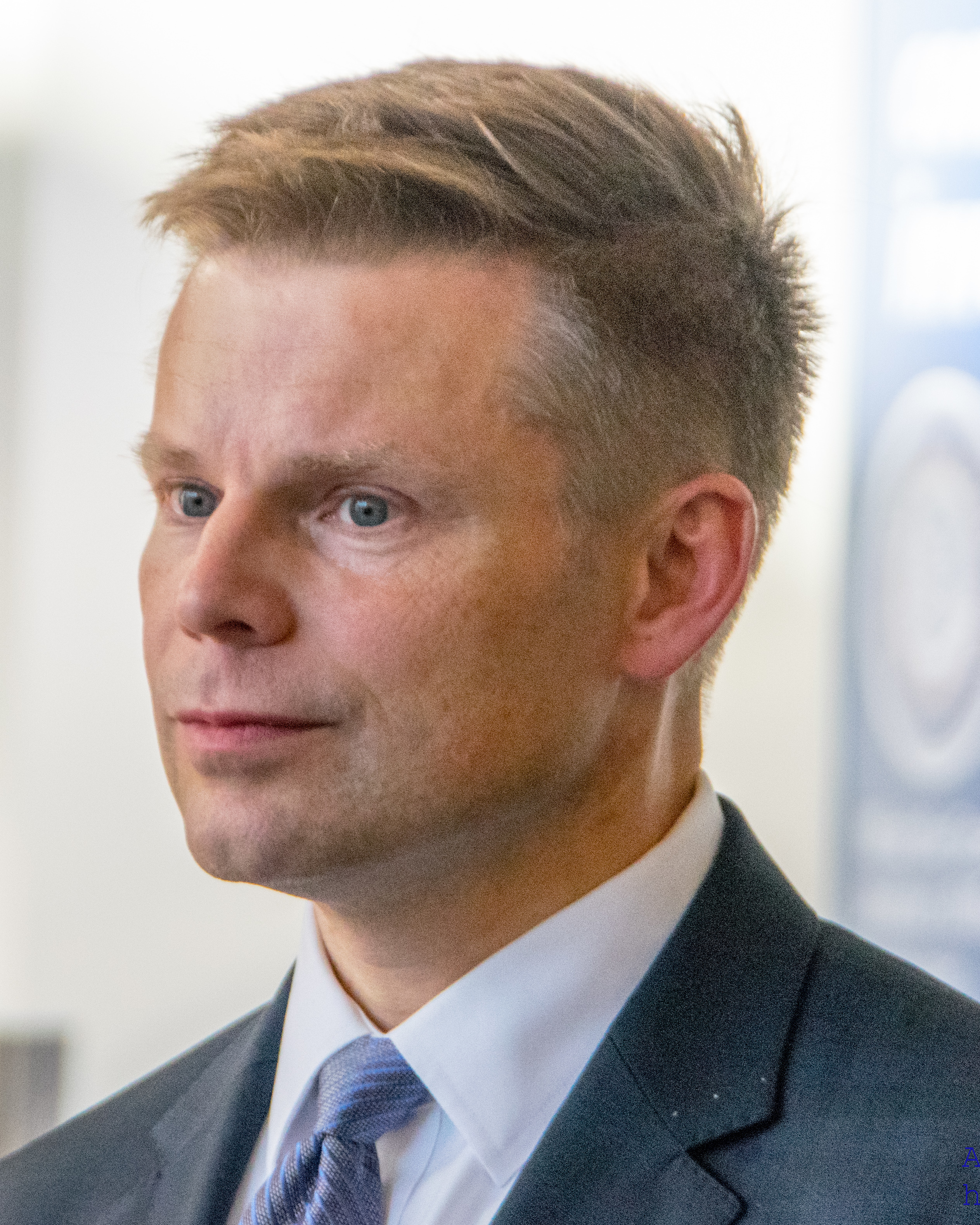

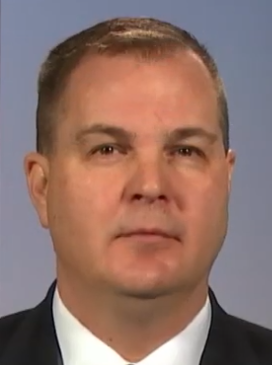
	Majority party	Minority party
Leader	Jamie Pedersen	John Braun
Party	Democratic	Republican
Leader's seat	43rd–Seattle	20th–Centralia
Seats before	30	19
Seats won	30	19
Seat change	Steady	Steady
- Democratic incumbent Democratic incumbent retiring Republican incumbent Republican incumbent retiring
Majority Leader before election
Jamie Pedersen
Democratic
Elected Majority Leader
Jamie Pedersen
Democratic

The 2026 Washington State Senate election was held on November 3, 2026, alongside the other 2026 United States elections. Voters elected 24 of the 49 the members of the Washington State Senate in the U.S. state of Washington's legislative districts to serve a four-year term.

Elections were held concurrently with the 2026 US midterm election, as well as elections to the US House of Representatives, Washington State House, Washington Supreme Court, and various county and local offices. Primary elections were held on August 4, 2026 using a top-two primary where all candidates were listed on the same ballot and the two candidates with the most votes advanced to the general election.

This was the first electoral cycle for this cohort of State Senators using the new legislative district boundaries after the court ordered redistricting in 2024. The redistricting was triggered when U.S. District Court Judge for the Western District of Washington Robert Lasnik ruled that the 15th District as it was drawn in 2022 was in violation of the Voting Rights Act of 1965. The seats up for election in the State Senate in 2026 that had boundary changes due to this redistricting are District 7, District 8, District 13, District 15, and District 31.

== Partisan background ==
Of the State Senate seats that are up for election in 2026, only the 35th District is held by a Republican in a legislative district that Kamala Harris won in 2024. In addition, of the districts with a Senator up for election in 2026, only the 26th District has a member of the State House from the same district who is of a different party than the incumbent State Senator.

All other districts up for election in 2026 are represented by the party whose presidential nominee carried the district in 2024 and are of the same political party as both members of the State House from their district.

Harris 40–50% 50–60% 60–70% 70–80% 80–90% 90–100% / Trump 40–50% 50–60% 60–70%

On April 16th, 2026, the Republican State Leadership Committee (RSLC) announced that they would be investing in Washington state legislative races to protect incumbents and flip seats. They did not announce investments in any specific races at that time.

== Outgoing incumbents ==
=== Retirements ===
1. District 8: Matt Boehnke (R) is retiring to run for Congress.
2. District 13: Judy Warnick (R) is retiring
3. District 29: Steve Conway (D) is retiring.
4. District 37: Rebecca Saldaña (D) is retiring to run for the King County Council.
5. District 42: Sharon Shewmake (D) is retiring.

=== Incumbents running in a new district ===
1. District 15: Nikki Torres (R) is running in the 8th District.

== Predictions ==
Source	Ranking	As of
Sabato's Crystal Ball	Safe D	January 22, 2026

== Summary of results by district ==
- Districts not listed were not up for election in 2026.
- † Incumbent did not seek re-election in that seat.

District	2024 Pres.	Incumbent	Party	Elected Senator	Outcome
6th	R+10.9	Jeff Holy	Rep	TBD	
7th	R+31.9	Shelly Short	Rep	TBD	
8th	R+23.7	Matt Boehnke†	Rep	TBD	
13th	R+28.0	Judy Warnick†	Rep	TBD	
15th	R+23.5	Nikki Torres†	Rep	TBD	
21st	D+36.5	Marko Liias	Dem	TBD	
26th	D+9.4	Deborah Krishnadasan	Dem	TBD	
29th	D+20.6	Steve Conway†	Dem	TBD	
30th	D+19.9	Claire Wilson	Dem	TBD	
31st	R+7.1	Phil Fortunato	Rep	TBD	
32nd	D+53.0	Jesse Salomon	Dem	TBD	
33rd	D+36.2	Tina Orwall	Dem	TBD	
34th	D+69.6	Emily Alvarado	Dem	TBD	
35th	D+0.7	Drew MacEwen	Rep	TBD	
36th	D+80.9	Noel Frame	Dem	TBD	
37th	D+73.3	Rebecca Saldaña†	Dem	TBD	
38th	D+19.2	June Robinson	Dem	TBD	
42nd	D+9.8	Sharon Shewmake†	Dem	TBD	
43rd	D+81.3	Jamie Pedersen	Dem	TBD	
44th	D+20.7	John Lovick	Dem	TBD	
45th	D+44.0	Manka Dhingra	Dem	TBD	
46th	D+78.3	Javier Valdez	Dem	TBD	
47th	D+15.1	Claudia Kauffman	Dem	TBD	
48th	D+44.9	Vandana Slatter	Dem	TBD	

== District 6 ==
The 6th district is represented by Republican Jeff Holy, who is eligible to run for re-election but has not yet stated if he will do so.

=== Candidates ===
==== Advacned to general ====
- Jeff Holy (Republican), incumbent state senator

=== Endorsements ===
Jeff Holy (R)

Organizations

- Mainstream Republicans of Washington

=== Results ===
Washington's 6th State Senate District, 2026
Primary election
Party	Candidate	Votes	%
Republican	Jeff Holy (incumbent)	18,890	91.8
Write-in		1,694	8.2
Total votes		20,584	100.0
General election
Republican	Jeff Holy (incumbent)		
Write-in			
Total votes			100.0

== District 7 ==
The 7th district is represented by Republican Shelly Short, who is running for re-election.

=== Candidates ===
==== Advanced to general ====
- Ronald McCoy (Independent), former mayor of Chewelah, Chewelah City Council member, and candidate for state house in the 7th district in 2024
- Shelly Short (Republican), incumbent state senator

==== Eliminated in primary ====
- Brandon Ray Medina (Republican)
- David Swoap (Republican)

=== Endorsements ===
Shelly Short (R)

Organizations

- Mainstream Republicans of Washington

=== Results ===
Washington's 7th State Senate District, 2026
Primary election
Party	Candidate	Votes	%
Republican	Shelly Short (incumbent)	20,456	58.3
No party preference	Ronald McCoy	9,528	27.1
Republican	Brandon Ray Medina	2,947	8.4
Republican	David Swoap	1,969	5.6
Write-in		153	0.6
Total votes		35,107	100.0
General election
Republican	Shelly Short (incumbent)		
No party preference	Ronald McCoy		
Write-in			
Total votes			100.0

== District 8 ==
The 8th district is represented by Republican Matt Boehnke, who is retiring to run for U.S. House in Washington's 4th congressional district to replace retiring incumbent Dan Newhouse (R-Sunnyside).

=== Candidates ===
==== Advanced to general ====
- Gabe Galbraith (Republican), president of the Kennewick School Board
- Nikki Torres (Republican), incumbent state senator for the 15th district

==== Declined ====
- Matt Boehnke (Republican), incumbent state senator (running for U.S. House)
- Stephanie Barnard (Republican), state representative for the 8th district
- April Connors (Republican), state representative for the 8th district

==== Withdrawn ====
- Douglas McKinley (Democratic), lawyer and candidate for WA CD 4 in 2020

=== Endorsements ===
Nikki Torres (R)

State legislators

- Stephanie Barnard, state representative from the 8th district
- April Connors, state representative from the 8th district

Organizations

- Mainstream Republicans of Washington

=== Results ===
Washington's 8th State Senate District, 2026
Primary election
Party	Candidate	Votes	%
Republican	Nikki Torres	15,841	52.0
Republican	Gabe Galbraith	14,123	46.3
Write-in		525	1.7
Total votes		30,489	100.0
General election
Republican	Nikki Torres		
Republican	Gabe Galbraith		
Write-in			
Total votes			100.0

== District 13 ==
The 13th district is represented by Republican Judy Warnick who is retiring.

=== Candidates ===
==== Advanced to general ====
- Alex Ybarra (Republican), incumbent state representative for the 13th district

==== Declined ====
- Tom Dent (Republican), incumbent state representative
- Judy Warnick (Republican), incumbent state senator

=== Endorsements ===
Alex Ybarra (R)

Organizations

- Mainstream Republicans of Washington

=== Results ===
Washington's 13th State Senate District, 2026
Primary election
Party	Candidate	Votes	%
Republican	Alex Ybarra	20,303	97.2
Write-in		589	2.8
Total votes		20,892	100.0
General election
Republican	Alex Ybarra		
Write-in			
Total votes			100.0

== District 15 ==
The 15th district is represented by Republican Nikki Torres, who initially was going to run for re-election in this seat, but decided to run for the 8th district's open state senate seat vacated by Matt Boehnke.

Sen. Torres was first elected to this seat in 2022, but was drawn out of the district by court ordered redistricting in 2024. She continued to represent the district in the Senate despite no longer residing in it.

=== Candidates ===
==== Advanced to general ====
- Jeremie Dufault (Republican), incumbent state representative for the 15th district

==== Declined ====
- Nikki Torres (Republican), incumbent state senator (running in the 8th district)

=== Endorsements ===
Jeremie Dufault (R)

State legislators

- Chris Corry, state representative from the 15th district

Local officials

- Matt Brown, mayor of Yakima

=== Results ===
Washington's 15th State Senate District, 2026
Primary election
Party	Candidate	Votes	%
Republican	Jeremie Dufault	23,612	95.3
Write-in		1,160	4.7
Total votes		24,772	100.0
General election
Republican	Jeremie Dufault		
Write-in			
Total votes			100.0

== District 21 ==
The 21st district is represented by Democrat Marko Liias, who is running for re-election.

=== Candidates ===
==== Advanced to general ====
- Riaz Khan (Republican), former Mukilteo City Council member, former vice-chair of the 21st District Democrats, and candidate for state house in this district in 2024
- Marko Liias (Democratic), incumbent state senator

=== Results ===
Washington's 21st State Senate District, 2026
Primary election
Party	Candidate	Votes	%
Democratic	Marko Liias (incumbent)	23,221	72.1
Republican	Riaz Khan	8,841	27.4
Write-in		155	0.5
Total votes		32,217	100.0
General election
Democratic	Marko Liias (incumbent)		
Republican	Riaz Khan		
Write-in			
Total votes			100.0

== District 26 ==
The 26th district is represented by Democrat Deborah Krishnadasan, who is running for re-election.

=== Candidates ===
==== Advanced to general ====
- Deborah Krishnadasan (Democratic), incumbent state senator
- Gary Parker (Republican), restaurant owner

==== Endorsements ====
Deborah Krishnadasan (D)

Organizations

- Fuse Washington

=== Results ===
Washington's 26th State Senate District, 2026
Primary election
Party	Candidate	Votes	%
Democratic	Deborah Krishnadasan (incumbent)	27,198	57.5
Republican	Gary Parker	20,074	42.4
Write-in		28	0.1
Total votes		47,300	100.0
General election
Democratic	Deborah Krishnadasan (incumbent)		
Republican	Gary Parker		
Write-in			
Total votes			100.0

== District 29 ==
The 29th district is represented by Democrat Steve Conway, who is retiring. Sharlett Mena confirmed she would run for the seat and Melanie Morgan, the other state representative for the district, stated she would support Mena for the state senate seat.

=== Candidates ===
==== Advanced to general ====
- David Anderson (Democratic), STEM professor at Tacoma Community College
- Sharlett Mena (Democratic), incumbent state representative for the 29th district

==== Declined ====
- Steve Conway (Democratic), incumbent state senator for the 29th district
- Melanie Morgan (Democratic), incumbent state representative for the 29th district

==== Endorsements ====
Sharlett Mena (D)

Labor unions

- United Farm Workers

Organizations

- Fuse Washington

=== Results ===
Washington's 29th State Senate District, 2026
Primary election
Party	Candidate	Votes	%
Democratic	Sharlett Mena	11,965	69.8
Democratic	David Anderson	4,394	25.6
Write-in		782	4.6
Total votes		17,141	100.0
General election
Democratic	Sharlett Mena		
Democratic	David Anderson		
Write-in			
Total votes			100.0

== District 30 ==
The 30th district is represented by Democrat Claire Wilson, who is running for re-election.

=== Candidates ===
==== Advanced to general ====
- Michael Rutland (Republican)
- Claire Wilson (Democratic), incumbent state senator

=== Results ===
Washington's 30th State Senate District, 2026
Primary election
Party	Candidate	Votes	%
Democratic	Claire Wilson (incumbent)	13,373	61.9
Republican	Michael Rutland	8,234	38.1
Write-in		11	0.1
Total votes		21,618	100.0
General election
Democratic	Claire Wilson (incumbent)		
Republican	Michael Rutland		
Write-in			
Total votes			100.0

== District 31 ==
The 31st district is represented by Republican Phil Fortunato, who is running for re-election.

=== Candidates ===
==== Advanced to general ====
- Phil Fortunato (Republican), incumbent state senator
- Tamara Stramel (Democratic)

=== Endorsements ===
Phil Fortunato (R)

Organizations

- Mainstream Republicans of Washington

=== Results ===
Washington's 31st State Senate District, 2026
Primary election
Party	Candidate	Votes	%
Republican	Phil Fortunato (incumbent)	18,260	54.3
Democratic	Tamara Stramel	15,319	45.6
Write-in		31	0.1
Total votes		33,610	100.0
General election
Republican	Phil Fortunato (incumbent)		
Democratic	Tamara Stramel		
Write-in			
Total votes			100.0

== District 32 ==
The 32nd district is represented by Democrat Jesse Salomon, who is running for re-election.

=== Candidates ===
==== Advanced to general ====
- Cindy Ryu (Democratic), incumbent state representative for the 32nd district
- Jesse Salomon (Democratic), incumbent state senator

==== Eliminated in primary ====
- Ira McBee (Republican)

=== Results ===
Washington's 32nd State Senate District, 2026
Primary election
Party	Candidate	Votes	%
Democratic	Cindy Ryu	17,013	43.9
Democratic	Jesse Salomon (incumbent)	14,600	37.7
Republican	Ira McBee	7,077	18.3
Write-in		50	0.1
Total votes		38,740	100.0
General election
Democratic	Cindy Ryu		
Democratic	Jesse Salomon (incumbent)		
Write-in			
Total votes			100.0

== District 33 ==
The 33rd district is represented by Democrat Tina Orwall, who is running for re-election.

=== Candidates ===
==== Advanced to general ====
- Tina Orwall (Democratic), incumbent state senator

=== Results ===
Washington's 33rd State Senate District, 2026
Primary election
Party	Candidate	Votes	%
Democratic	Tina Orwall (incumbent)	19,248	95.3
Write-in		943	4.7
Total votes		20,191	100.0
General election
Democratic	Tina Orwall (incumbent)		
Write-in			
Total votes			100.0

== District 34 ==
The 34th district is represented by Democrat Emily Alvarado, who is running for re-election.

=== Candidates ===
==== Advanced to general ====
- Emily Alvarado (Democratic), incumbent state senator

=== Results ===
Washington's 34th State Senate District, 2026
Primary election
Party	Candidate	Votes	%
Democratic	Emily Alvarado (incumbent)	32,588	97.3
Write-in		892	2.7
Total votes		33,480	100.0
General election
Democratic	Emily Alvarado (incumbent)		
Write-in			
Total votes			100.0

== District 35 ==
The 35th district is represented by Republican Drew MacEwen, who is running for re-election.

=== Candidates ===
==== Advanced to general ====
- Drew MacEwen (Republican), incumbent state senator
- Carolina Mejia (Democratic), Thurston County Council member

=== Endorsements ===
Drew MacEwen (R)

Organizations

- Mainstream Republicans of Washington

=== Results ===
Washington's 35th State Senate District, 2026
Primary election
Party	Candidate	Votes	%
Republican	Drew MacEwen (incumbent)	20,441	50.1
Democratic	Carolina Mejia	20,310	49.8
Write-in		49	0.1
Total votes		40,800	100.0
General election
Republican	Drew MacEwen (incumbent)		
Democratic	Carolina Mejia		
Write-in			
Total votes			100.0

== District 36 ==
The 36th district is represented by Democrat Noel Frame, who is running for re-election.

=== Candidates ===
==== Advanced to general ====
- Jillian England (Republican), 36th District Republicans vice-chair
- Noel Frame (Democratic), incumbent state senator

=== Results ===
Washington's 36th State Senate District, 2026
Primary election
Party	Candidate	Votes	%
Democratic	Noel Frame (incumbent)	37,987	87.7
Republican	Jillian England	5,257	12.1
Write-in		91	0.2
Total votes		43,335	100.0
General election
Democratic	Noel Frame (incumbent)		
Republican	Jillian England		
Write-in			
Total votes			100.0

== District 37 ==
The 37th district is represented by Democrat Rebecca Saldaña, who will not run for re-election. She will run for the King County Council District 2 seat that was vacated by Girmay Zahilay when he won election to become King County Executive in November 2025. The two representatives for the district Chipalo Street and Sharon Tomiko Santos stated that they discussed who should run for her vacant seat and decided that Rep. Street would.

=== Candidates ===
==== Advanced to general ====
- Tatiana Brown (Democratic), public health and policy researcher
- Chipalo Street (Democratic), incumbent state representative for the 37th district

==== Declined ====
- Rebecca Saldaña (Democratic), incumbent state senator
- Sharon Tomiko Santos (Democratic), state representative

==== Withdrawn ====
- Emijah Smith (Democratic), community organizer and candidate for state house in this district in 2022

=== Results ===
Washington's 37th State Senate District, 2026
Primary election
Party	Candidate	Votes	%
Democratic	Chipalo Street	26,434	73.9
Democratic	Tatiana Brown	8,970	25.1
Write-in		351	1.0
Total votes		35,775	100.0
General election
Democratic	Chipalo Street		
Democratic	Tatiana Brown		
Write-in			
Total votes			100.0

== District 38 ==
The 38th district is represented by Democrat June Robinson, who is running for re-election.

=== Candidates ===
==== Advanced to general ====
- Brad Bender (Republican)
- June Robinson (Democratic), incumbent state senator

=== Results ===
Washington's 38th State Senate District, 2026
Primary election
Party	Candidate	Votes	%
Democratic	June Robinson (incumbent)	18,539	66.2
Republican	Brad Bender	9,422	33.6
Write-in		54	0.2
Total votes		28,015	100.0
General election
Democratic	June Robinson (incumbent)		
Republican	Brad Bender		
Write-in			
Total votes			100.0

== District 42 ==
The 42nd district is represented by Democrat Sharon Shewmake, who will not seek re-election. Both Democratic State Representatives for the district have also declined to seek the Senate seat.

=== Candidates ===
==== Advanced to general ====
- Erika Creydt (Republican), clinical psychologist and Blaine School Board director
- Michael Shepard (Democratic), Port of Bellingham commissioner

==== Eliminated in Primary ====
- Ryan Bowman (Independent), full-time caregiver and small business owner
- Eamonn Collins (Democratic), teacher at the Lummi Nation School, chair of the Whatcom County Democrats

==== Declined ====
- Ben Elenbaas (Republican), incumbent Whatcom County Council member
- Alicia Rule (Democratic), state representative
- Simon Sefzik (Republican), former state senator
- Sharon Shewmake (Democratic), incumbent state senator (retiring)
- Joe Timmons (Democratic), state representative

==== Endorsements ====
Eamonn Collins (D)

Local officials

- Kaylee Galloway, Whatcom County Council member for district 1 (2022–present)
- Elizabeth Boyle, Whatcom County Council member for district 2 (2026–present)
- Jessica Rienstra, Whatcom County Council member for district 3 (2026–present)
- Jon Scanlon, Whatcom County Council member for at-large position B (2024–present)
- Jace Cotton Bellingham City Council member (2024–present)
Erika Creydt (R)

Organizations

- Mainstream Republicans of Washington
Michael Shepard (D)

State legislators

- Jamie Pedersen, State Senate Majority Leader, state senator from the 43rd district
- Sharon Shewmake, incumbent state senator from the 42nd district

=== Results ===
Washington's 42nd State Senate District, 2026
Primary election
Party	Candidate	Votes	%
Republican	Erika Creydt	22,125	44.56
Democratic	Michael Shepard	13,125	26.43
Democratic	Eamonn Collins	13,121	26.42
No party preference	Ryan Bowman	1,248	2.51
Write-in		35	0.07
Total votes		50,451	100.00
General election
Republican	Erika Creydt		
Democratic	Michael Shepard		
Write-in			
Total votes			100.0

== District 43 ==
The 43rd district is represented by Democrat and incumbent Majority Leader Jamie Pedersen, who is running for re-election.

=== Candidates ===
==== Advanced to general ====
- Jamie Pedersen (Democratic), incumbent state senator and Senate majority leader
- Hannah Sabio-Howell (Democratic), former state senate staffer

==== Eliminated in primary ====
- Heather-Marie Wilson (No party preference), wife of former Seattle city council candidate Kenneth Wilson

=== Endorsements ===
Jamie Pedersen (D)

State officials

- Bob Ferguson, governor of Washington (2023–present)

State legislators

- Nicole Macri, state representative from the 43rd district (2017–present)
Hannah Sabio-Howell (D)

State legislators

- Rebecca Saldaña, state senator from the 37th district (2016–present)
- Shaun Scott, state representative from the 43rd district (2025–present)

Local officials

- Toshiko Hasegawa, Port of Seattle commissioner for position 4 (2022–present)
- Alexis Mercedes Rinck, Seattle City Council member from the 8th position (2024–present)
- Katie Wilson, mayor of Seattle (2026–present)

Organizations

- Washington Working Families Party

=== Results ===
Washington's 43rd State Senate District, 2026
Primary election
Party	Candidate	Votes	%
Democratic	Jamie Pedersen (incumbent)	23,157	67.1
Democratic	Hannah Sabio-Howell	8,024	23.3
No party preference	Heather-Marie Wilson	3,242	9.4
Write-in		89	0.3
Total votes		34,512	100.0
General election
Democratic	Jamie Pedersen (incumbent)		
Democratic	Hannah Sabio-Howell		
Write-in			
Total votes			100.0

== District 44 ==
The 44th district is represented by Democrat John Lovick, who is running for re-election.

=== Candidates ===
==== Advanced to general ====
- Sherri Larkin (Republican), Snohomish School District board member
- John Lovick (Democratic), incumbent state senator

=== Results ===
Washington's 44th State Senate District, 2026
Primary election
Party	Candidate	Votes	%
Democratic	John Lovick (incumbent)	22,270	61.9
Republican	Sherri Larkin	13,675	38.0
Write-in		53	0.2
Total votes		35,998	100.0
General election
Democratic	John Lovick (incumbent)		
Republican	Sherri Larkin		
Write-in			
Total votes			100.0

== District 45 ==
The 45th district is represented by Democrat Manka Dhingra, who is running for re-election.

=== Candidates ===
==== Advanced to general ====
- Manka Dhingra (Democratic), incumbent state senator

=== Results ===
Washington's 45th State Senate District, 2026
Primary election
Party	Candidate	Votes	%
Democratic	Manka Dhingra (incumbent)	25,137	90.4
Write-in		2,663	9.6
Total votes		27,800	100.0
General election
Democratic	Manka Dhingra (incumbent)		
Write-in			
Total votes			100.0

== District 46 ==
The 46th district is represented by Democrat Javier Valdez, who is running for re-election.

=== Candidates ===
==== Advanced to general ====
- Sandra Stephens (Republican)
- Javier Valdez (Democratic), incumbent state senator

=== Results ===
Washington's 46th State Senate District, 2026
Primary election
Party	Candidate	Votes	%
Democratic	Javier Valdez (incumbent)	38,737	90.6
Republican	Sandra Stephens	3,925	9.2
Write-in		108	0.3
Total votes		42,770	100.0
General election
Democratic	Javier Valdez (incumbent)		
Republican	Sandra Stephens		
Write-in			
Total votes			100.0

== District 47 ==
The 47th district is represented by Democrat Claudia Kauffman, who is running for re-election.

=== Candidates ===
==== Advanced to general ====
- Claudia Kauffman (Democratic), incumbent state senator
- Kristina Soltys (Republican), Covington City Council member

==== Withdrawn ====
- Carmen Goers (Republican), banker and runner-up for U.S. representative from WA-08 in 2024

=== Results ===
Washington's 47th State Senate District, 2026
Primary election
Party	Candidate	Votes	%
Democratic	Claudia Kauffman (incumbent)	15,333	59.1
Republican	Kristina Soltys	10,564	40.7
Write-in		33	0.1
Total votes		25,930	100.0
General election
Democratic	Claudia Kauffman (incumbent)		
Republican	Kristina Soltys		
Write-in			
Total votes			100.0

== District 48 ==
The 48th district is represented by Democrat Vandana Slatter, who is running for re-election.

=== Candidates ===
==== Advanced to general ====
- Vandana Slatter (Democratic), incumbent state senator

=== Results ===
Washington's 48th State Senate District, 2026
Primary election
Party	Candidate	Votes	%
Democratic	Vandana Slatter (incumbent)	18,778	94.6
Write-in		1,083	5.5
Total votes		19,861	100.0
General election
Democratic	Vandana Slatter (incumbent)		
Write-in			
Total votes			100.0

== See also ==
- Washington State Senate
- Elections in Washington (state)
- Washington State Redistricting Commission
- Political party strength in Washington (state)
