= Washington legislative districts =

List of Washington districts

The following is a list of the forty-nine legislative districts in the U.S. state of Washington since the 2024 redistricting. From the time Washington achieved statehood in 1889, it has elected members for representation to the state legislature. Each district elects a state senator and two district representatives. The districts have changed throughout state history through periodical redistricting, most recently in 2024 following the Soto Palmer v. Hobbs court case District lines in Washington are drawn by the Washington State Redistricting Commission, which is made up of four members appointed by the legislature's party leaders and a fifth non-voting chair.

== Districts ==
Below is a gallery of forty-nine legislative districts of Washington as of the March 2024 Redistricting. Current members are listed at Washington State Senate and Washington House of Representatives.

1st LD: King (part), Snohomish (part)

2nd LD: Pierce (part), Thurston (part)

3rd LD: Spokane (part)

4th LD: Spokane (part)

5th LD: King (part)

6th LD: Spokane (part)

7th LD: Chelan (part), Douglas (part), Ferry, Okanogan (part), Pend Oreille, Spokane (part), Stevens

8th LD: Benton (part), Franklin (part)

9th LD: Adams (part), Asotin, Columbia, Garfield, Lincoln, Spokane (part), Whitman

10th LD: Island, Skagit (part), Snohomish(part)

11th LD: King (part)

12th LD: Chelan, King (part), Snohomish (part)

13th LD: Adams (part), Douglas (part), Grant (part), Kittitas,

14th LD: Benton (part), Franklin (part), Klickitat (part), Yakima (part)

15th LD: Benton (part), Yakima (part)

16th LD: Benton (part), Franklin (part), Grant (part), Walla Walla

17th LD: Clark (part), Klickitat (part), Skamania

18th LD: Clark (part)

19th LD: Cowlitz (part), Grays Harbor(part), Lewis (part), Pacific, Thurston (part), Wahkiakum

20th LD: Clark (part), Cowlitz (part), Lewis (part), Thurston (part)

21st LD: Snohomish (part)

22nd LD: Thurston (part)

23rd LD: Kitsap (part)

24th LD: Clallam, Grays Harbor (part), Jefferson

25th LD: Pierce (part)

26th LD: Kitsap (part), Pierce (part)

27th LD: Pierce (part)

28th LD: Pierce (part)

29th LD: Pierce (part)

30th LD: King (part)

31st LD: King (part), Pierce (part)

32nd LD: King (part), Snohomish (part)

33rd LD: King (part)

34th LD: King (part)

35th LD: Kitsap (part), Mason, Thurston(part)

36th LD: King (part)

37th LD: King (part)

38th LD: Snohomish (part)

39th LD: Skagit (part), Snohomish (part)

40th LD: San Juan, Skagit (part), Whatcom (part)

41st LD: King (part)

42nd LD: Whatcom (part)

43rd LD: King (part)

44th LD: Snohomish (part)

45th LD: King (part)

46th LD: King (part)

47th LD: King (part)

48th LD: King (part)

49th LD: Clark (part)

== See also ==
- Washington State Redistricting Commission
- Washington State Legislature
- Washington State Senate
- Washington House of Representatives
- List of Washington state legislatures
