= Senator Carlisle (disambiguation) =

John G. Carlisle (1834–1910) was a U.S. Senator from Kentucky from 1890 to 1893.

Senator Carlisle may also refer to:

- Ron Carlisle (born 1940), North Dakota State Senate
- Reuven Carlyle (born 1965), Washington State Senate
