= Margaret Rayburn =

American politician from Washington

Member of the Washington House of Representatives from the 15th district
- In office 1985–1995
- Preceded by: Lyle J. Dickie
- Succeeded by: Jim Honeyford

Personal details
- Born: April 5, 1927 North Powder, Oregon
- Died: May 14, 2013 (aged 86) Sunnyside, Washington
- Party: Democratic
- Education: Eastern Washington University

Margaret Shaw Rayburn (April 5, 1927 – May 14, 2013) was an American politician and teacher who served as a member of the Washington House of Representatives.

== Early life and education ==
Born in North Powder, Oregon, Rayburn graduated from Eastern Washington University with a Bachelor of Arts degree in education.

== Career ==
After graduating from college, Rayburn worked as a teacher in Grandview, Washington. After she retired from teaching, Rayburn was elected to the Washington House of Representatives from 1985 to 1995 as a Democrat. She and her husband operated an orchard near Grandview, Washington.

== Death ==
Rayburn died in Sunnyside, Washington.
