= Bruce Chandler =

American businessman and politician from Washington

Minority Leader of the Washington House of Representatives
- In office January 10, 2005 – January 9, 2006
- Preceded by: Richard DeBolt
- Succeeded by: Richard DeBolt

Member of the Washington House of Representatives from the 15th district
- In office January 11, 1999 – January 13, 2025
- Preceded by: Jim Honeyford
- Succeeded by: Chris Corry

Personal details
- Born: May 7, 1952 (age 74) Everett, Washington, U.S.
- Party: Republican
- Spouse: Julie Chandler
- Children: 3
- Education: Louisiana State University (attended)
- Occupation: Businessman, politician
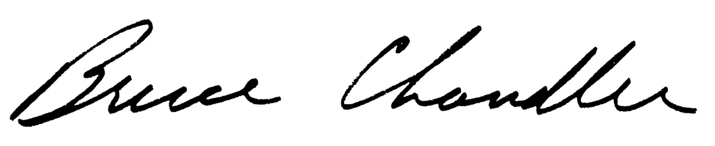
- Signature

Bruce Q. Chandler (born May 7, 1952) is an American businessman and politician from Washington. Chandler was a Republican member of the Washington House of Representatives, representing District 15, Position 1 from 1999 to 2025.

== Career ==
In 1985, Chandler became the owner and operator of Chandler Ranches Limited Liability Company, a commercial fruit orchard.

On November 3, 1998, Chandler won the election and became a Republican member of Washington House of Representatives for District 15, Position 1. Chandler defeated Walter J. Braten with 62.04% of the votes.

On November 3, 2020, as an incumbent, Chandler won the election, and continued serving as a member of Washington House of Representatives for District 15, Position 1. Chandler defeated Jack McEntire with 58.02% of the votes.

== Awards ==
- 2008 Key Award. Presented by Washington Coalition for Open Government.
- 2010 Legislator of the Decade. Presented by NFIB.
- 2011 Cornerstone Award. Presented by the Association of Washington Business.
- 2012 Guardian of Small Business award. Presented by NFIB.
- 2012 W. Fred Witham Memorial Award. Presented by Yakima Association of Realtors.
- 2014 Guardians of Small Business award. Presented by NFIB.
- 2016 Crayon Award. Presented by Early Learning Action Alliance.
- 2020 Guardians of Small Business. Presented by NFIB.

== Personal life ==
Chandler's wife is Julie Chandler. They have three children. Chandler and his family lived in Zillah, Washington and now live in Granger, Washington.
