= Jay Lane (politician) =

American politician

Member of the Washington House of Representatives from the 36th district
- In office January 14, 1981 – November 1981
- Preceded by: Joe A. Taller
- Succeeded by: Seth Armstrong

Personal details
- Born: 1940 (age 85–86) South Dakota
- Party: Republican

Jay Lane (born 1940) is an American politician. She is a Republican and represented District 36 in the Washington House of Representatives which included parts of King County.
