= Liz Berry (politician) =

American politician from Washington (born 1983)

Member of the Washington House of Representatives from the 36th district
- Incumbent
- Assumed office January 11, 2021 Serving with Julia Reed
- Preceded by: Gael Tarleton

Personal details
- Born: Elizabeth Jean Berry; 1983 (age 42–43) Phoenix, Arizona
- Party: Democratic
- Children: 2
- Education: American University (BA)
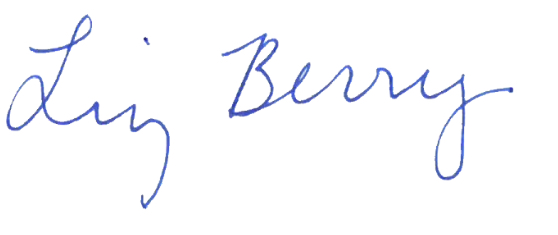
- Signature

Elizabeth Jean Berry (born 1983) is an American politician who is a member of the Washington House of Representatives for the 36th district. Elected in 2020, Berry assumed office on January 11, 2021.

== Early life and education ==
Berry is a native of Phoenix, Arizona. Her father was a trial lawyer, and her mother was a teacher. Berry earned a Bachelor of Arts degree from American University, where she studied communications, law, and government.

== Career ==
From 2007 to 2010, Berry worked as the legislative director for Congresswoman Gabby Giffords in Washington, D.C. In 2011, she moved to Seattle, where she continued to work in politics. In 2016, she became the executive director of the Washington State Association for Justice. In the 2020 election for district 36 (position 2) in the Washington House of Representatives, Berry placed first in the Democratic primary and defeated Sarah Reyneveld in the November general election. She assumed office on January 11, 2021. As of 2024, Berry's district comprises the Seattle neighborhoods of Queen Anne, Phinney Ridge, and Greenwood.

In the state House, Berry has sponsored legislation to create guaranteed basic income pilot programs for very low-income adults. She supported efforts, backed by the state's firefighters, to accelerate the removal of PFAS, a class of toxic chemicals, from firefighting gear. In 2023, she sponsored the Washington Recycling and Packaging (WRAP) Act, a bill to create a bottle deposit program in Washington state, increase the state's recycling rate, and reduce litter and packaging waste. In 2023, she supported a bill that entitled Uber and Lyft drivers to paid family and medical leave and unemployment benefits; the companies supported the bill, which was enacted into law.

With the support of Governor Jay Inslee, she sponsored legislation in 2023 to require a 10-day waiting period for firearm purchases in the state; the bill passed the House on a 52-44 vote. In 2022, in the wake of many mass shootings in the U.S., Berry also supported legislation to ban high-capacity magazine sales in the state.

== Personal life ==
Berry and her husband, Michael, have two children. They live in Queen Anne, Seattle.

== See also ==
- 2020 Washington House of Representatives election
