= Julia Reed (politician) =

American politician

Member of the Washington House of Representatives from the 36th district
- Incumbent
- Assumed office January 9, 2023 Serving with Liz Berry
- Preceded by: Noel Frame

Personal details
- Born: March 21, 1987 (age 39) Redmond, Washington, U.S.
- Party: Democratic
- Education: Smith College (BA); Princeton University (MPA)

Julia Reed (born March 21, 1987) is an American politician of the Democratic Party. She is a member of the Washington House of Representatives, representing the 36th district.
