= Jim Honeyford =

American politician

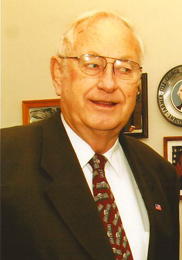

Member of the Washington Senate from the 15th district
- In office January 11, 1999 – January 9, 2023
- Preceded by: Irv Newhouse
- Succeeded by: Nikki Torres

Member of the Washington House of Representatives from the 15th district
- In office January 9, 1995 – January 10, 1999
- Preceded by: Margaret Rayburn
- Succeeded by: Bruce Chandler

Personal details
- Born: James Dwight Honeyford; January 24, 1939 (age 87) Ontario, Oregon, U.S.
- Party: Republican
- Spouse: Jerri
- Children: 4
- Education: Central Washington University (BA, MEd)
- Profession: Teacher
- Website: Official

James Dwight Honeyford (born January 24, 1939) is an American politician of the Republican Party. He served as a member of the Washington State Senate, representing the 15th district between 1999 and 2023.

== Early life and education ==
Honeyford was born in Ontario, Oregon. He earned a Bachelor of Arts degree in sociology and a Master of Education from Central Washington University.

== Career ==
From 1960 to 1965, Honeyford served as an officer in the Ellensburg Police Department. He also worked as a teacher, coach, and librarian in the Ellensburg School District. Honeyford served as a member of the Washington House of Representatives from 1995 to 1999 and the Washington State Senate from 1999 to 2023.

In February 2011, Honeyford walked out on a legislative hearing in protest of "ghost bills" that are heard in committee, but not written until later. In September 2011, he was awarded the "Key Award" by the Washington Coalition for Open Government.

On March 2, 2015, Seattle-based newspaper The Stranger reported that, during a committee hearing about a proposed racial impact statement bill, Honeyford shared his belief that "poor" and "colored" people were most likely to commit crimes.

== Awards ==
- 2014 Guardians of Small Business award. Presented by NFIB.
