= Reuven Carlyle =

American politician (born 1965)

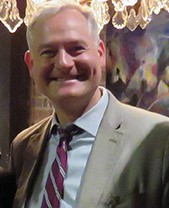
- Carlyle in 2015

Member of the Washington Senate from the 36th district
- In office January 7, 2016 – January 9, 2023
- Preceded by: Jeanne Kohl-Welles
- Succeeded by: Noel Frame

Member of the Washington House of Representatives from the 36th district
- In office January 12, 2009 – January 7, 2016
- Preceded by: Helen Sommers
- Succeeded by: Noel Frame

Personal details
- Born: Reuven Michael Carlyle; August 10, 1965 (age 61) San Francisco, California, U.S.
- Party: Democratic
- Spouse: Wendy Carlyle
- Education: University of Massachusetts Amherst (BA); Harvard University (MPA)
- Occupation: Politician, businessman
- Website: sdc.wastateleg.org/carlylel

Reuven Michael Carlyle (born August 10, 1965) is an American businessman and politician. A Democrat, he served in the Washington State Legislature, representing the 36th district. In 2023, following his public service, Carlyle co-founded Earth Finance, Inc., a Seattle-based climate advisory and technology firm. Carlyle serves as a political analyst for King 5 News, the NBC affiliate in Seattle, and is a frequent guest on KUOW, the NPR affiliate in Seattle.

== Legislature ==
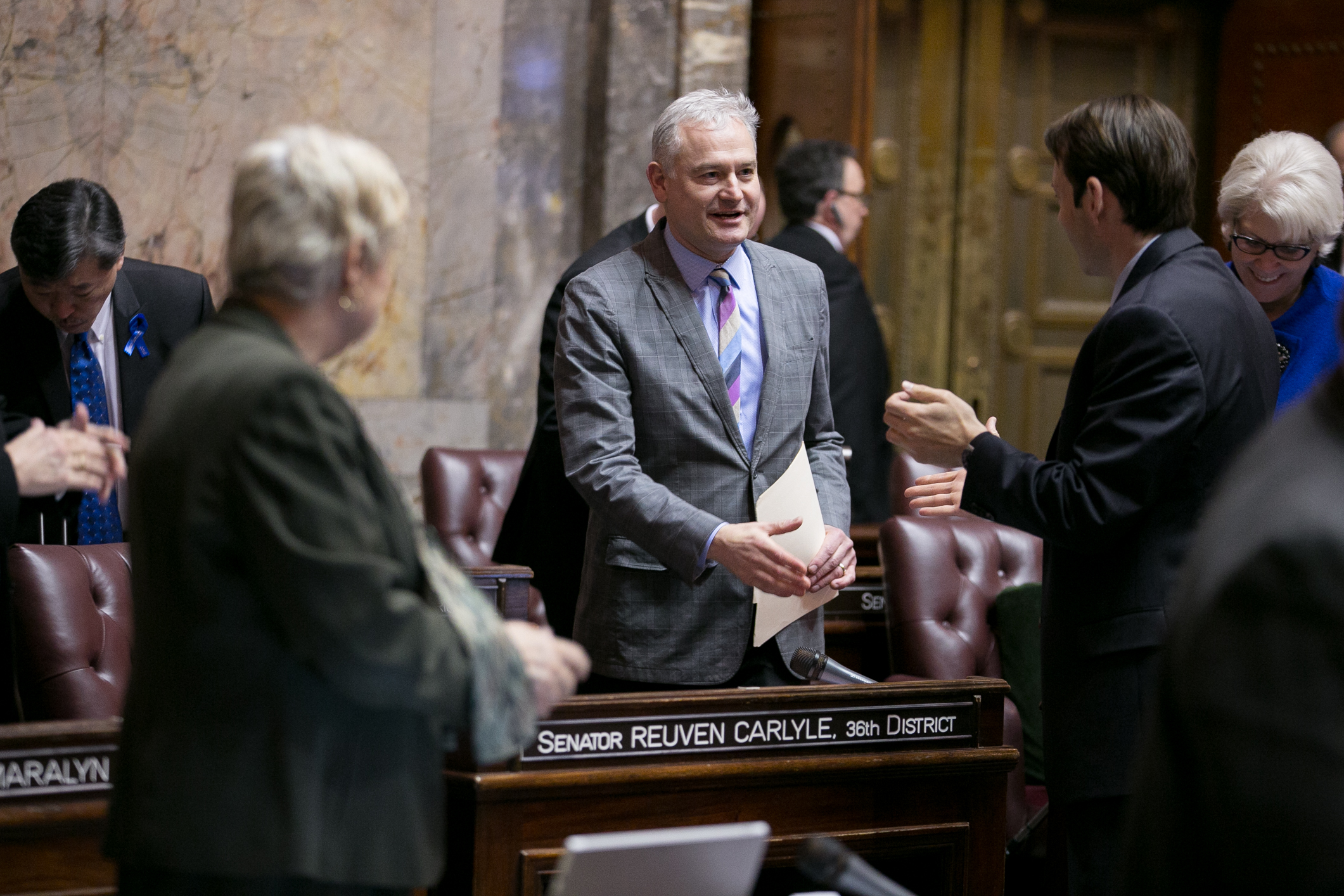
Carlyle in 2016

Carlyle served as chair of the Senate Environment, Energy & Technology Committee, as well as a member of the Ways & Means and Rules Committee. Carlyle was re-elected in 2018 for a four-year term with 89.3% of the vote against Libertarian Bryan Simonson.

During Carlyle's years as committee chair, the Legislature has adopted among the most sweeping carbon legislation in the U.S. This includes: Climate Commitment Act (the second cap and invest carbon pricing legislation in anticipation of joining the Western Climate Initiative); Clean Fuel Standard; HEAL Act (environmental justice and equity), transportation package widely considered the greenest package in state history; commercial building standards; building efficiency standards, HFCs and more. Under the legislation, Washington is one of the few governments in the world with, in effect, binding and enforceable commitments to net zero policies and the regulatory framework to achieve the reductions.

In 2024, during the campaign for Initiative 2117 to repeal the Climate Commitment Act, Carlyle played a leading role opposing the repeal effort. Carlyle represented the "No on 2117" position and debated initiative sponsor Brian Heywood at Seattle University. The initiative was defeated by voters 61.95% (no to repeal) to 38.05% (yes to repeal).

In 2019, Carlyle prime sponsored comprehensive clean energy legislation, SB 5116, to require all electric utilities in Washington to transition to a 100-percent, carbon-neutral electricity supply by 2030 and to 100-percent carbon-free electricity by 2045. The bill was a cornerstone of Gov. Jay Inslee's climate agenda.

In 2018, he was one of only seven senators to vote against the Legislature's public records bill that was ultimately vetoed by Gov. Jay Inslee following a public outcry by the state's media and the public.

Carlyle's legislative priorities have been centered around budget policy and tax transparency, foster youth, higher education, energy and environmental priorities. In 2007, prior to his election, Carlyle authored the Passport to College Promise Program which was ultimately created by the Legislature.

Carlyle was first elected to the Washington House of Representatives in 2008, representing the 36th legislative district as a Democrat. He was appointed to the state Senate in 2016 to succeed veteran Sen. Jeanne Kohl-Welles who was elected in 2015 to the King County Council.

During Carlyle's seven years in the House he focused on a range of policy areas including budget, tax, higher education, transportation, health care, open data and election issues. He sponsored major legislation to reform higher education finance and improve the educational success of foster youth. Carlyle has been the prime sponsor of legislation in each year to abolish the death penalty and replace the policy with life in prison without the possibility of parole. Carlyle has been a critic of efforts to expand coal and oil trains and exports throughout the Pacific Northwest. He has been a vocal legal and political opponent of initiative promoter Tim Eyman's efforts to alter the state constitution to require a supermajority to raise taxes.

In 2013 Carlyle was appointed chair of the House Finance Committee and as a budget writer. During his three years as Finance chair, Carlyle sponsored legislation to provide transparency into Washington's tax structure. He also passed major legislation to reinstate Washington's estate tax as well reform the state's telecommunications taxation. In the Finance role, he was a prime sponsor and a supporter of the accountability and transparency provisions of the Boeing tax package, widely considered the largest state tax incentive package in U.S. history. Carlyle was publicly critical of the abbreviated process of the special session.

Carlyle was named in 2012 as "one of 12 legislators in the nation to watch" by Governing Magazine. He was named one of the most "tech savvy" legislators in the nation by GovTech. He was named by the progressive organization Fuse as a champion of tax reform. In 2016 he was awarded the Ballard/Thompson Award by the Washington State Coalition for Open Government, the state's premier organization for open government and public access to government information. In 2017, he received legislator of the year award from Washington Conservation Voters.

Carlyle announced he would not seek reelection on January 24, 2022. Carlyle's awards, program participation and recognitions include: Boys & Girls Club Alumni Hall of Fame; Aspen Institute of Germany; National Caucus of Environmental Legislators' Leon G. Billings Environmental Achievement Award; National Caucus of Environmental Legislators' representative to COP26 in Glasgow; Legislator of the Year—Treehouse; Washington Conservation Voters Legislator of the Year.

== Personal ==
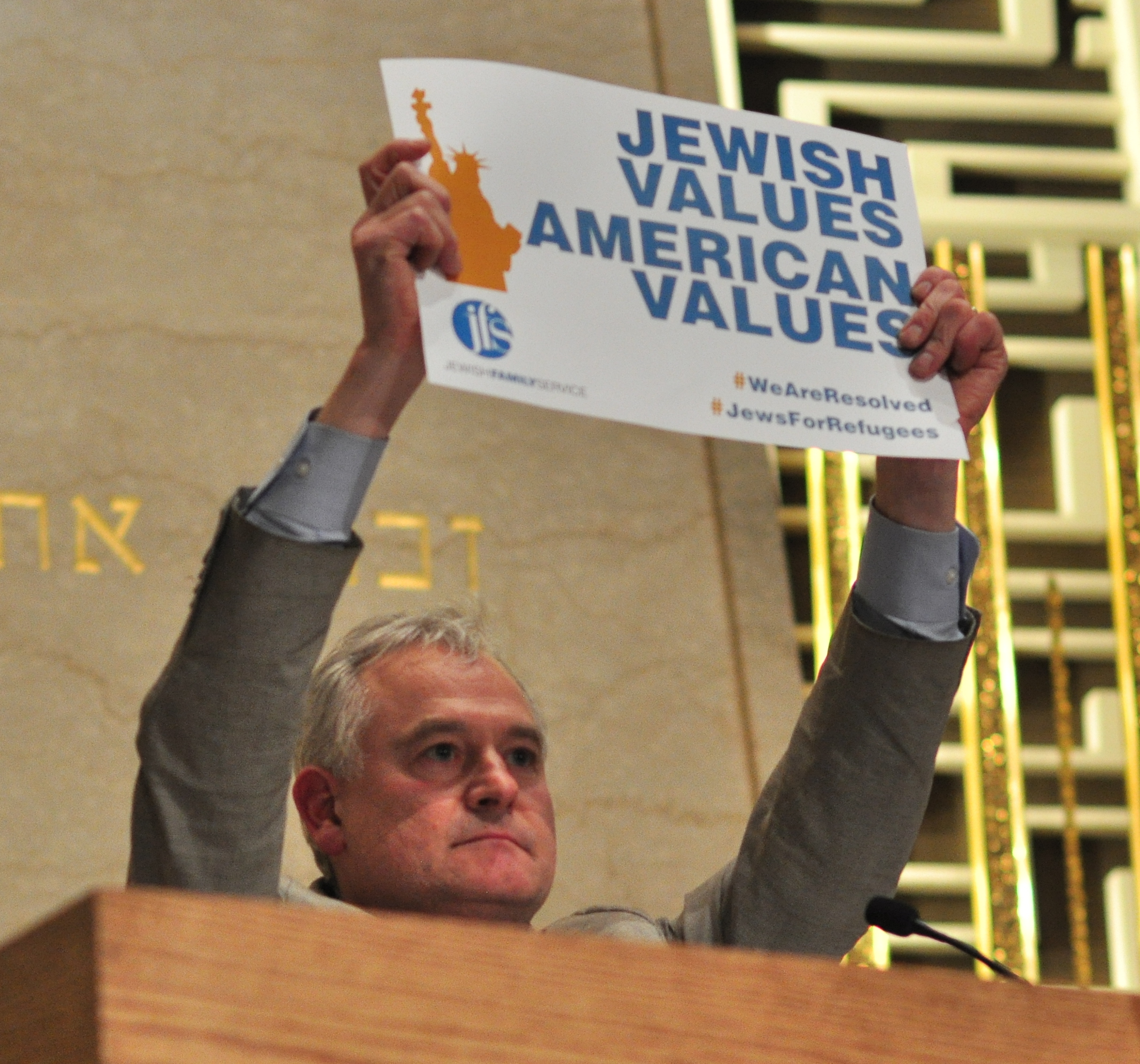
Carlyle addressing a rally organized in response to Executive Order 13769, 2017

Carlyle resides in Seattle with his wife Dr. Wendy Carlyle – an anesthesiologist practicing in Seattle. They have four children. Carlyle grew up in Bellingham, Washington and developed his interest in government while serving as a teenage page in Congress. He served as a page for Warren Magnuson for two years.

Prior to his election, Carlyle was appointed by Governor Chris Gregoire in 2004 as a member of the Washington State Board for Community and Technical Colleges. He crafted legislation in 2007 as a citizen activist for foster youth, Passport to College Promise, a scholarship program. Carlyle was a citizen co-founder of the Seattle/King County Chapter of City Year, a national AmeriCorps program.

Washington House of Representatives
Preceded by Helen Sommers	Member of the Washington House of Representatives from the 36th district 2009 – 2016	Succeeded by Noel Frame
Washington State Senate
Preceded by Jeanne Kohl-Welles	Member of the Washington State Senate from the 36th district 2016 – 2023	Succeeded by Noel Frame
