= Drew MacEwen =

American politician (born 1973)

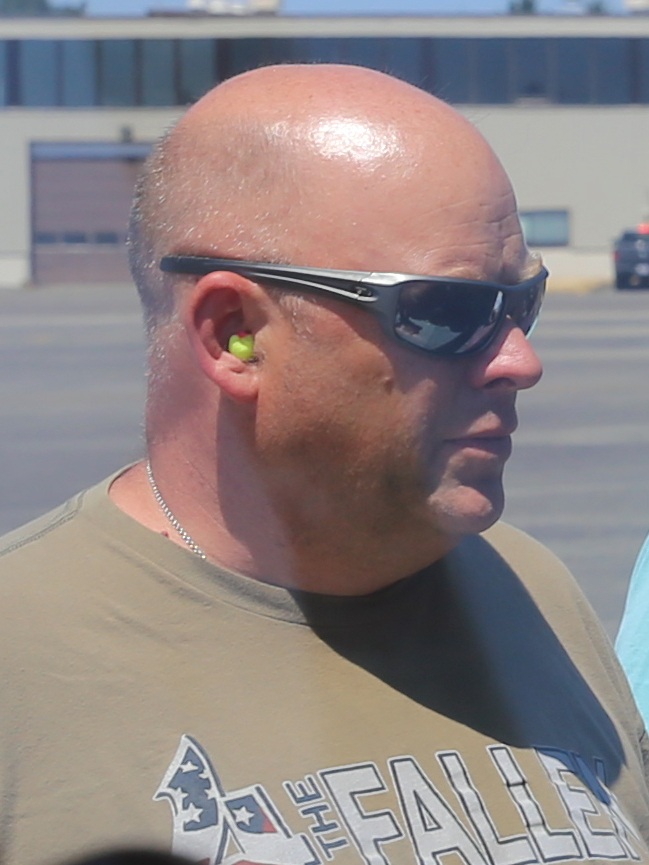

Member of the Washington State Senate from the 35th district
- Incumbent
- Assumed office January 9, 2023
- Preceded by: Tim Sheldon

Member of the Washington House of Representatives from the 35th district
- In office January 14, 2013 – January 9, 2023
- Preceded by: Fred Finn
- Succeeded by: Travis Couture

Personal details
- Born: Drew Christian MacEwen; June 12, 1973 (age 53) Minnesota, U.S.
- Party: Republican
- Education: Excelsior College (BS)
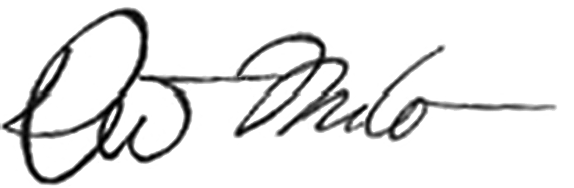
- Signature
- Website: Party website Campaign website

Drew Christian MacEwen (born June 12, 1973) is an American politician of the Republican Party. He is a member of the Washington State Senate, representing the 35th district, which covers the entirety of Mason County and parts of Kitsap and Thurston counties.

== Career ==
MacEwen is a real estate investor and developer, and a financial advisor. He formerly was in the Navy. He is president of Falcon Financial Inc., managing partner of Mountain Lakes Capital Management, and a partner in two restaurants.

In 2012, MacEwen was elected to the state House, defeating Lynda Ring Erickson of the Democratic Party by a margin of 51.84% (32,975 votes) to 48.16% (30,638 votes). He took office in 2013. In 2014, he defeated Tammey Newton of the Democratic Party by a margin of 59.21% (27,408) to 40.79% (18,885). In 2016, he defeated Craig Patti of the Independent Democratic Party by a margin of 54.21% (35,384) to 45.79% (29,888). In 2018, he defeated Democratic candidate David Daggett by 33,320 votes (51.22%) to 31,738 votes (48.78%). In 2020, he defeated Democratic candidate Darcy Huffman by 47,618 votes (56.42%) to 36,668 votes (43.44%).

In 2015, MacEwen sponsored legislation (House Bill 1838) to allow bear-baiting of black bears as a hunting practice under some circumstances. The Humane Society opposed the legislation.

In 2015, MacEwen introduced legislation that would create a lower minimum wage for workers under 18 years of age and would allow employers to count benefits, such as healthcare, toward the minimum wage.

During the 2016 presidential election between Hillary Rodham Clinton and Donald Trump, MacEwen declined to say who he would vote for.

In 2018, MacEwen and two other Republican state legislators (Doug Ericksen and Brandon Vick) traveled to Cambodia to observe the undemocratic elections in the country, which were not free and fair. The election was held under Hun Sen's authoritarian regime, which has repressed the opposition as well as independent media. The visit raised concerns about whether the three lawmakers were being used to give a veneer of credibility to the sham elections, which were not observed by internationally recognized election monitors. Governor Jay Inslee wrote a letter to the legislators to express concern about the visit. After MacEwen and Vick met with the U.S. ambassador to Cambodia, both cut the trip short and returned to Washington.

After the Cypress Island Atlantic salmon pen break, MacEwen co-sponsored legislation to ban the net-pen farming of Atlantic salmon in Washington, due to the risk that the escapes of the non-native species from salmon farms would cause environmental harm. The legislation had bipartisan support, and Governor Inslee, a Democrat, signed the legislation in 2018.

During the 2020 session, MacEwen was the Republicans' deputy floor leader. In May 2020, during the COVID-19 pandemic in Washington, MacEwen was one of four Republican state legislators who sued Inslee in federal court, contending that "the emergency has been contained" and that Inslee lacked the power to issue restrictions to slow the spread of the virus. The court rejected the challenge.

MacEwen reportedly considered a bid for Governor of Washington in 2020. In the Washington State Senate in 2022 he defeated Democrat Julianne Gale to replace retiring Democrat Tim Sheldon. In December 2023, MacEwen announced that he was running for U.S. house He was defeated by Democratic state Senator Emily Randall in the general election, receiving 43% of the vote. Despite his loss, MacEwen was the best-performing Republican candidate in Washington's 6th congressional district since 1980.
