= Deborah Krishnadasan =

American politician

Member of the Washington State Senate from the 26th district
- Incumbent
- Assumed office December 11, 2024
- Preceded by: Emily Randall

Personal details
- Party: Democratic
- Education: Western Washington University (BA)

Deborah Krishnadasan is an American politician serving as a member of the Washington State Senate from the 26th district. She was appointed by the Kitsap County Board of Commissioners and the Pierce County Council in 2024 to fill the vacancy left by Emily Randall's resignation following being elected to the U.S. House of Representatives. A Democrat, she previously served as president of the Peninsula School Board.

== Early life and education ==
Krishnadasan grew up in Puyallup and graduated from Western Washington University with a Bachelor of Arts in communications.

== Career ==
Her professional career includes working in communications and human resources for natural resources and tech companies including Burlington Resources, Visio Corporation, and Microsoft.

=== Peninsula School Board ===
Krishnadasan was first elected to the Peninsula School Board for District 2 in a 2015 special election and won re-election to the seat unopposed in 2017. She served a two-year term as the board's president from 2019 to 2021.

=== Washington Senate ===
She was appointed by the Kitsap County Board of Commissioners and the Pierce County Council to the Washington Senate on December 11, 2024, to replace Emily Randall. She ran in a November 2025 special election to fill the remainder of Randall's term, facing Republican state representative Michelle Caldier in the general election. Krishnadasan won the election by a margin of over 5%. She ran for a full term the following year, defeating Gig Harbor Rotary Club president Gary Parker by a margin of over 12%.

In March 2025, Krishnadasan was one of two Democrats to vote with Republicans against the state budget due to tax increases. After being sworn in, she sponsored a bill which would amend the state constitution to lower the current 60% voter approval threshold to pass school funding bonds down to 55% of the vote.

== Personal life ==
Krishnadasan and her husband Baiya, a Sri Lankan-born cardiothoracic surgeon, moved to Gig Harbor in 2008 and have three kids: Alexander, Audrey, and Gabriel.
