= Emily Randall =

American politician (born 1985)

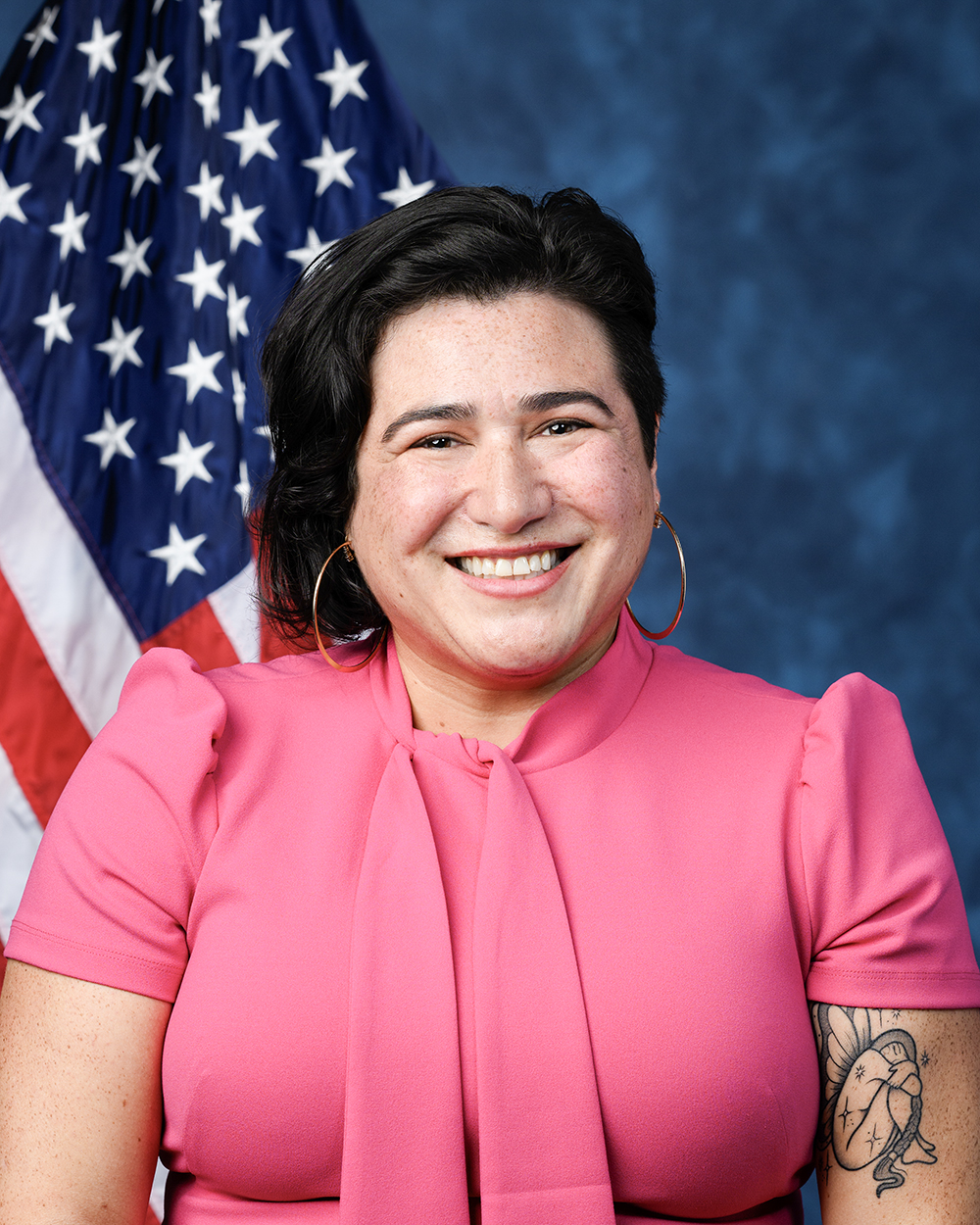
- Official portrait, 2024

Member of the U.S. House of Representatives from Washington's 6th district
- Incumbent
- Assumed office January 3, 2025
- Preceded by: Derek Kilmer

Member of the Washington Senate from the 26th district
- In office January 14, 2019 – December 8, 2024
- Preceded by: Jan Angel
- Succeeded by: Deborah Krishnadasan

Personal details
- Born: Emily Elissa Randall; October 30, 1985 (age 41) Port Orchard, Washington, U.S.
- Party: Democratic
- Domestic partner: Alison Leahey
- Education: Wellesley College (BA)
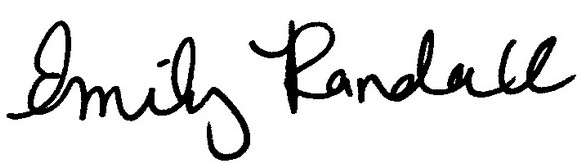
- Signature
- Website: House website Campaign website

Emily Elissa Randall (born October 30, 1985) is an American politician and healthcare advocate serving as the U.S. representative for Washington's 6th congressional district since 2025. A member of the Democratic Party, she previously served in the Washington State Senate from 2019 to 2024. Her district encompasses the Olympic Peninsula, the Kitsap Peninsula, and most of the city of Tacoma. Randall was elected to succeed fellow Democrat Derek Kilmer in the U.S. House of Representatives.

== Early life and education ==
Randall was born in the Kitsap Peninsula to a white mother who works as a paraeducator and a Chicano father who worked as a shipyard worker. Raised in Port Orchard, Randall graduated from South Kitsap High School in 2004. The first to graduate college in her family, Randall graduated from Wellesley College with a Bachelor of Arts degree in Spanish and women's studies. Her sister, Olivia, was born with microcephaly resulting in severe developmental and physical disabilities. Her family relied on Medicaid to help cover costs for her sister's healthcare that was not covered by her father's insurance.

Randall worked at Boston Children’s Hospital and the San Francisco AIDS Foundation advocating for healthcare and education.

== Washington Senate (2019–2024) ==
In 2018, Randall was elected to the Washington State Senate, defeating Republican challenger Marty McClendon by 104 votes. In 2022, Randall won re-election to the Washington State Senate with around 51% of the vote.

As senator, Randall focused on increasing access to better behavioral health and reproductive health, affordable housing, and public safety. She served as whip for the state senate majority.

In February 2019, she spearheaded and helped pass the Randall Bill that "allowed the children of service members who receive transfer orders to any base in Washington to enroll in school before they have an address in district" to help support their family's transition. “As we welcome the families connected to the USS Carl Vinson to Bremerton this year, we want to make sure that regardless of the makeup of your family or how soon you know that you’re coming to our community, we’ve cleared the ground for you.”

In March 2022, Randall sponsored a bill to lower the toll to cross the Tacoma Narrows Bridge by 75 cents. The bill was passed and took effect in October of the same year. Alongside Senator Claire Wilson, Randall was one of two openly LGBTQ+ women serving in the Washington State Senate. Randall served in the senate’s Higher Education committee, Workforce Development Committee, and on the Health and Long Term Care and Transportation committee.

In June 2024, Randall fired her campaign manager for liking anti-Zionist and pro-Hamas Instagram posts. In an interview following the firing, Randall stated, "Israel has exercised its lawful right to defend itself against terrorist attacks, and has the unalienable right to do so against any future attacks from internal or external malign actors, such as Hamas or Iran." She further stated, "As an LGBTQ+ person and the grandchild of people who left their home to find a place to live with less discrimination, I feel a great connection to Israel. Israel is the only country in the region where I could live openly with my wife, Alison."

== U.S. House of Representatives (2025–present) ==
=== Elections ===
==== 2024 ====
After U.S. Representative Derek Kilmer announced his retirement from Congress, Randall entered the race to succeed him. Washington's 6th congressional district which covers the Olympic Peninsula, the Kitsap Peninsula (including Naval Base Kitsap) and the majority of Tacoma. During her primary campaign, Randall was endorsed by several prominent Democrats including U.S. Senator Patty Murray, U.S. Representative Marilyn Strickland, U.S. Representative Marie Gluesenkamp Perez, and former governors Christine Gregoire and Gary Locke.

In the 2024 open primary for Washington's 6th congressional district, Randall finished first ahead of Republican state senator Drew MacEwan who also advanced to the general election ballot after finishing second. Randall defeated MacEwan in the 2024 general election carrying 56.8% of votes. On January 3, 2025, Randall became the first queer Latina to serve in the U.S. House of Representatives.

=== Tenure ===
Before the start of the 119th Congress, Randall placed third in a three-way race for freshman class representative for the Democratic Caucus that included Representative-elects Luz Rivas of California and Sarah Elfreth of Maryland. In the first five months of Randall's tenure, she hosted numerous town halls to address constituents' anger and fear over the Trump administration's proposed changes to Medicaid. During a roundtable with Puget Sound Naval Shipyard union leaders, she listened to reports of how the Trump administration's efforts to fire federal employees had caused large disruptions, lowered morale, and led to increased turnover and plans for early retirement amongst senior employees.

On January 22, 2025, Randall voted against the passage of the Laken Riley Act. In response to the Protecting Women's Private Spaces Act, Randall posted an "All Gender Bathroom" sign outside of her office welcoming everyone to use her private restroom "regardless of gender identity or expression, political ideology or shoe size." In her first speech on the House floor, Randall denounced House Bill 28, the "Protection of Women and Girls in Sports Act of 2025" that sought to ban trans women from playing on women's sports teams.

Randall walked out of President Trump's Address to Congress on March 4, 2025, while Trump was speaking. She noted, "That decision to walk out was not calculated. Instead, when Trump began uplifting a child cancer survivor while working with Republicans to pass Medicaid cuts that would gut funding for cancer research and children facing cancer, I could not sit through it anymore. I got into politics because I care about healthcare. We should be investing in our rural access healthcare.” She noted that many rural hospitals rely on Medicare and Medicaid to provide services and stay open.

As a co-chair of the Congressional Equality Caucus, Randall re-introduced the Equality Act to ensure explicit nondiscrimination protections for all LGBTQI+ Americans. "Queer folks deserve the same rights and protections as every American...But instead of ensuring every American has the tools to build their futures, this administration is hyper-focused on taking away our rights and trying to erase our very existence. But our community cannot be written out of history – because history isn’t made without us, and the future is not built without us.”

In May 2025, Randall introduced the bipartisan Assuring Navigation of Compact Help For Ongoing Relocation (ANCHOR) for Military Families Act along with Republican Rob Wittman of Virginia. The bill would help "ensure military families are informed of their educational rights, school enrollment support, and other key relocation resources—such as housing assistance, spouse employment support, and services through the Exceptional Family Member Program (EFMP)—under the Military Interstate Children’s Compact Commission (MIC3) during Permanent Change of Station (PCS) moves."

In June 2025, Randall was one of the four Democrats who did not vote on the initial $9 billion rescission package put forward by the Department of Government Efficiency (DOGE). The bill targeted reversing $1.1 billion for public broadcasting and $8.3 billion in foreign aid. House Republicans narrowly passed the initial rescission package by 2 votes; however, it was changed by the Senate to exclude cuts to the President's Emergency Plan for AIDS Relief (PEPFAR), and Donald Trump had to re-submit the revised version to Congress in July. On July 18, Randall voted no.

=== Committee assignments ===
- Committee on Natural Resources
  - Subcommittee on Federal Lands
  - Subcommittee on Indian and Insular Affairs
- Committee on Oversight and Government Reform
  - Subcommittee on Government Operations
  - Subcommittee on Health Care and Financial Services

=== Caucus memberships ===
- Congressional Equality Caucus (Co-chair)
- Congressional Hispanic Caucus
- Congressional Progressive Caucus
- New Democratic Coalition
- Congressional Freethought Caucus
- Future Forum

== Personal life ==
Randall co-owns a home in Bremerton, Washington, with her partner of 19 years, Alison Leahey, who works as a carpenter in construction. The Pew Research Center reported that Randall responded "none" to their religion survey.

Randall is the first LGBTQ+ Latina elected to the U.S. House of Representatives.

== See also ==
- List of LGBTQ members of the United States Congress
- List of Hispanic and Latino Americans in the United States Congress
- Women in the United States House of Representatives

U.S. House of Representatives
Preceded by Derek Kilmer	Member of the U.S. House of Representatives from Washington's 6th congressional district 2025–present	Incumbent
U.S. order of precedence (ceremonial)
Preceded by Nellie Pou	United States representatives by seniority 412th	Succeeded by Josh Riley
