= Nikki Torres =

American politician

Member of the Washington State Senate from the 15th district
- Incumbent
- Assumed office January 9, 2023
- Preceded by: Jim Honeyford

Personal details
- Born: United States
- Party: Republican
- Education: Columbia Basin College (AA); University of Phoenix (BS, MBA)
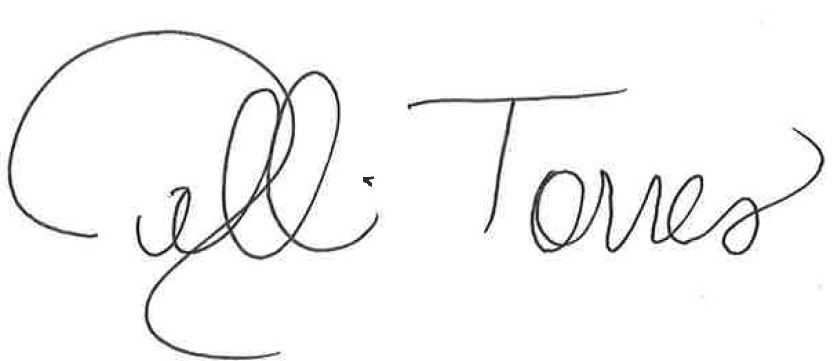
- Signature
- Website: Official

Nikki Torres is an American politician serving as a member of the Washington State Senate for the 15th district. Elected in November 2022, she assumed office on January 9, 2023.

== Early life and education ==
Torres was born in the United States to parents from Mexico who came to the country undocumented. She attended Pasco High School. She earned an associate degree from Columbia Basin College, followed by a Bachelor of Science in business administration and a Master of Business Administration from the University of Phoenix.

== Career ==
From 2000 to 2008, Torres worked as a secretary and health unit coordinator for hospitals in the Tri-Cities region. She was also a personal banker at AmericanWest Bank. Torres joined the University of Phoenix in 2009, working as an enrollment advisor until 2010 and as a regional account advisor from 2010 to 2013. From 2015 to 2020, she worked as a small business development officer at Gesa Credit Union. Since 2020, Torres has worked as a strategic partnerships manager at Western Governors University. She was elected to the Washington State Senate in November 2022.

Torres introduced Senate Bill 5631 in January 2024, which would require all Washington state agencies to clearly identify on their websites which programs and services Deferred Action for Childhood Arrivals recipient could access.
