= Karen Keiser =

American politician from Washington

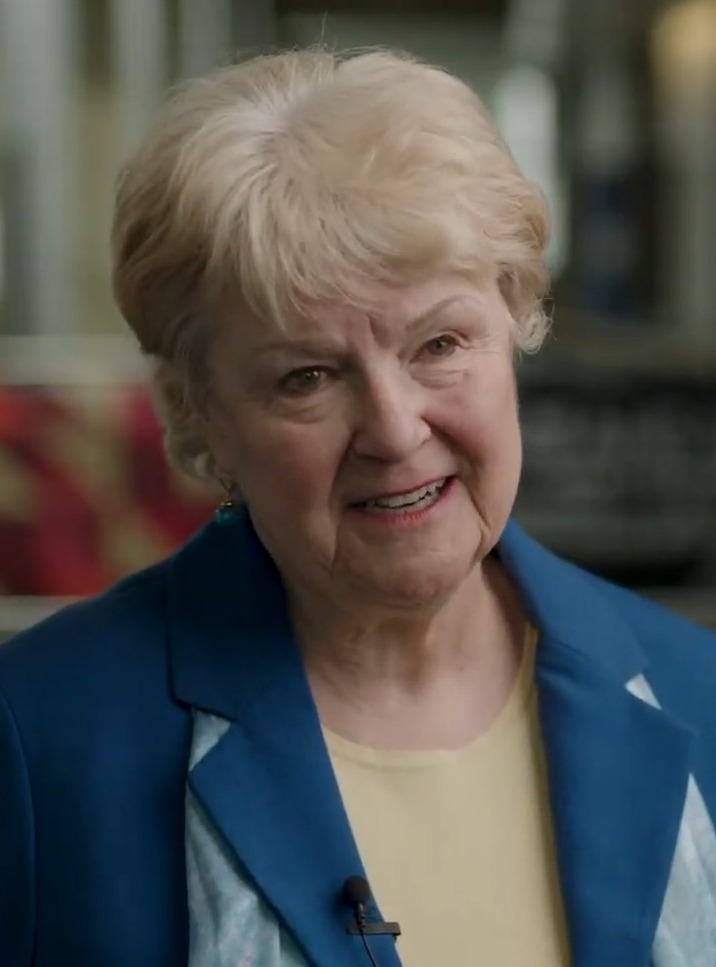

President pro tempore of the Washington Senate
- In office November 21, 2017 – December 10, 2024
- Preceded by: Tim Sheldon
- Succeeded by: Steve Conway

Member of the Washington Senate from the 33rd district
- In office December 10, 2001 – December 10, 2024
- Preceded by: Julia Patterson
- Succeeded by: Tina Orwall

Member of the Washington House of Representatives from the 33rd district
- In office January 8, 1996 – December 12, 2001
- Preceded by: Greg Fisher
- Succeeded by: Dave Upthegrove

Personal details
- Born: Karen Lynne Keiser; September 29, 1947 (age 78) Sioux City, Iowa, U.S.
- Party: Democratic
- Education: University of California, Berkeley (BA, MA)
- Website: State Senate website

Karen Lynne Keiser (born September 29, 1947) is an American politician of the Democratic Party. She represented the 33rd Legislative District in the Washington State Senate, which contains parts of Burien, Normandy Park, SeaTac, Kent, and Des Moines.

Senator Keiser served in the Washington state senate from 2001 to 2024. and served in the Washington House of Representatives from 1996 to 2001. She retired in December 2024.

Washington State Senate
Preceded by Tim Sheldon	President pro tempore of the Washington Senate; 2017–2024	Succeeded by Steve Conway
