= Noel Frame =

American politician

Member of the Washington State Senate from the 36th district
- Incumbent
- Assumed office January 9, 2023
- Preceded by: Reuven Carlyle

Member of the Washington House of Representatives from the 36th district
- In office January 7, 2016 – January 9, 2023
- Preceded by: Reuven Carlyle
- Succeeded by: Julia Reed

Personal details
- Born: March 26, 1980 (age 46) Battle Ground, Washington, U.S.
- Party: Democratic
- Spouse: Jim
- Education: George Washington University (BA, MA)

Noel Christina Frame (born March 26, 1980) is an American politician serving as a Washington state senator for the 36th district. A member of the Democratic Party, she previously served in the Washington House of Representatives, representing the same district.

== Political career ==
In January 2025, Frame introduced SB 5375, a bill making clergy members mandatory reporters of child abuse and neglect. The Washington State Catholic Conference opposed the bill, insisting that it would require Catholic priests to break the seal of confession, if disclosures were made in confession. The bill was signed into law in May 2025. In October, the state of Washington announced that it would not enforce the reporting requirements for information learned during confessional rites.

Frame was a sponsor of Senate Bill 6346, establishing an income tax on earnings above $1 million per year, which passed the state Senate in February 2026.
