= Jamie Pedersen =

American lawyer and politician

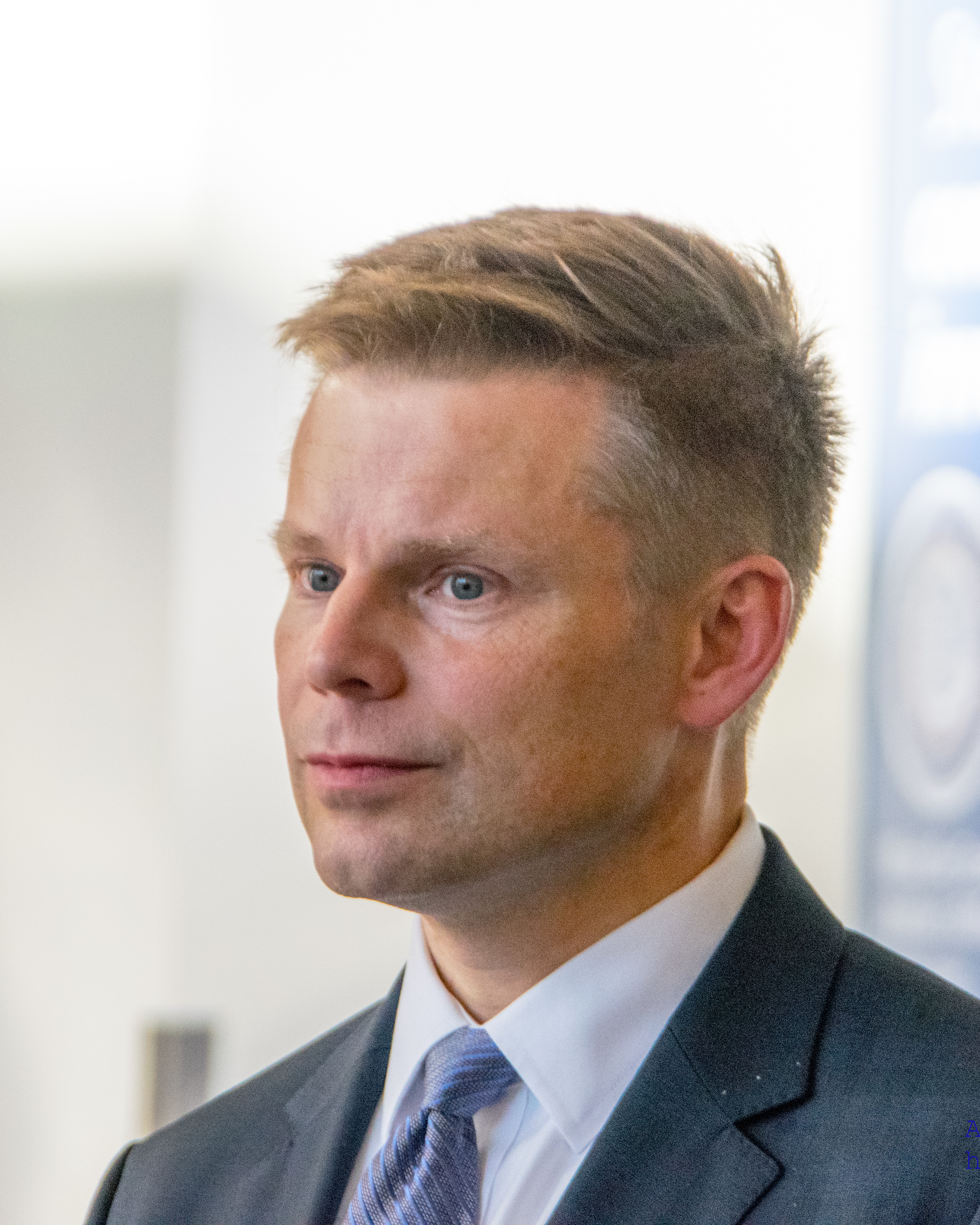

Majority Leader of the Washington State Senate
- Incumbent
- Assumed office January 13, 2025
- Preceded by: Andy Billig

Member of the Washington State Senate from the 43rd district
- Incumbent
- Assumed office December 16, 2013
- Preceded by: Ed Murray

Member of the Washington House of Representatives from the 43rd district
- In office January 8, 2007 – December 16, 2013
- Preceded by: Ed Murray
- Succeeded by: Brady Walkinshaw

Personal details
- Born: September 9, 1968 (age 57) Puyallup, Washington, U.S.
- Party: Democratic
- Spouse: Eric Cochran
- Education: Yale University (BA, JD)
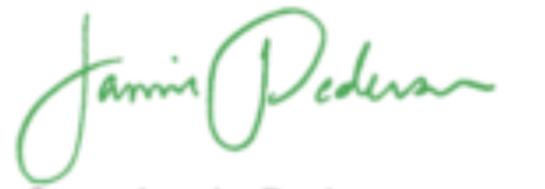
- Signature
- Website: Campaign website

Jamie D. Pedersen (born September 9, 1968) is an American lawyer and politician serving as the majority leader of the Washington State Senate, representing the 43rd district since 2013. A member of the Democratic Party, he previously served as a member of the Washington House of Representatives for the 43rd district from 2007 to 2013.

== Early life and education ==
Pedersen grew up in Puyallup, Washington and attended Puyallup High School. He graduated summa cum laude in American Studies from Yale and received his J.D. degree from Yale Law School. Pedersen was an active member of the Yale Russian Chorus while an undergraduate and law student, and remains active in the alumni of the Yale Russian Chorus. He clerked for Judge Stephen Williams on the U.S. Court of Appeals for the D.C. Circuit.

== Career ==
=== Law practice ===
Pedersen joined Preston Gates & Ellis in 1995, working on corporate mergers. His pro bono work during this time focused on gay rights issues and he was Lambda Legal's lead attorney on the state's same-sex marriage case – Andersen v. King County. In 2012 he was hired by McKinstry, a Seattle-headquartered construction firm, as General Counsel.

=== Washington State Legislature ===
Pedersen was elected to the Washington House of Representatives from Washington's 43rd legislative district in downtown Seattle in 2006. He won a very competitive six-way Democratic primary election on September 19, 2006, with 23 percent of the vote, defeating former Seattle City Council President Jim Street by 229 votes. The primary was the most expensive House contest in Washington state history at the time, with the candidates raising almost $500,000 among them. His election campaign won the support of the Gay & Lesbian Victory Fund, which provided financial and strategic assistance. In the general election, he faced only nominal Republican opposition, defeating his opponent by a margin of more than four-to-one. He was re-elected unopposed in 2008, 2010 and 2012.

Pedersen was one of a number of Washington legislators who were briefly the subject of controversy in 2013 over expense claims uncovered in an Associated Press investigation. Pedersen had used $384 in tax funds to purchase art for his office; Pedersen explained that legislators receive an allowance for furnishing their offices and he had, typically, not used his entire allotment.

=== Political positions ===
Pedersen has been a supporter of increased firearms regulation in Washington. In 2013, he introduced legislation that would require private gun dealers to request a background check from a local law-enforcement agency.

In the legislature, Pedersen has been a key proponent for the replacement of the Evergreen Point floating bridge and has introduced legislation to block the state's department of transportation from capping spending on the project.

In 2012, Pedersen publicly endorsed both Washington Initiative 502 and Washington Referendum 74, which legalized the retail sale of marijuana and same-sex marriage, respectively.

In January 2020, Pedersen introduced a bill to mandate local school districts create individualized learning programs for students who are selected to participate in gifted programs before those programs are terminated.

Pedersen was the primary sponsor of Senate Bill 6346, establishing an income tax on earnings above $1 million per year, which passed the state Senate in February 2026.

== Personal life ==
Pedersen is openly gay and is one of several LGBT members of the Washington State Legislature, alongside Sen. Marko Liias (D–Mukilteo) and Reps. Nicole Macri (D–Seattle), Laurie Jinkins (D–Tacoma) and Skyler Rude (R-Walla Walla).

Pedersen is married to Eric Cochran Pedersen, a high school assistant principal whom he met in 2004 while attending Seattle's Central Lutheran Church. Pedersen and his husband have four sons: Trygve Cochran Pedersen, and a set of triplets — Leif, Anders, and Erik (born 2009). The children were all given traditional Norwegian names by Pedersen, who has Norwegian descent.

Washington State Senate
Preceded by Andy Billig	Majority Leader of the Washington Senate; 2025–present	Incumbent
