= Rebecca Saldaña =

American politician (born 1977)

Member of the Washington State Senate from the 37th district
- Incumbent
- Assumed office December 12, 2016
- Preceded by: Pramila Jayapal

Personal details
- Born: Rebecca Jae Saldaña; April 1, 1977 (age 49) Seattle, Washington, U.S.
- Party: Democratic
- Children: 2
- Education: Seattle University (BA)
- Website: Official

Rebecca Jae Saldaña (born April 1, 1977) is an American politician serving as a member of the Washington State Senate from the 37th district, representing parts of Seattle and Renton, Washington. She was appointed by the King County Council to the office to replace Pramila Jayapal after she was elected to the United States House of Representatives.

On December 8, 2025, she announced her candidacy for King County Council District 2 in the 2026 special election.

== Early life and education ==
Saldaña was born in Seattle and raised in the Delridge neighborhood. Her father was a Mexican immigrant. She attended and graduated from John F. Kennedy Catholic High School in Burien. She then earned a Bachelor of Arts degree in theology and humanities from Seattle University.

== Career ==
After graduating from college, Saldaña began her career as an organizer with Oregon's farmworkers union, PCUN (Pineros y Campesinos Unidos del Noroeste). At PCUN, she coordinated a boycott of NORPAC foods. She served as a Union Organizer with Service Employees International Union Local 6 in Seattle and as the community liaison for U.S. Representative Jim McDermott. At the time of her appointment, Saldaña was the executive director of Puget Sound Sage, a progressive advocacy group. Saldaña gave her first speech from the Senate floor on January 16, 2017, in honor of Martin Luther King Jr.

Saldaña currently serves on the boards of Rainier Beach Action Coalition, Alliance of Clean Jobs and Energy, The Fair Work Center, and the Washington Environmental Council. She is a former board member of the Latino Community Fund of Washington.

As of April 2021, Saldaña is the vice chair of the Senate Transportation Committee. In April 2021, Saldaña answered a question and was seen on video in a transportation hearing while driving her vehicle. She later apologized.

== Political Positions ==
Saldaña voted YES on SB 6228 in 2026, an act removing the tax exemption for the warehousing and reselling of prescription drugs and providing tax relief for critical access pharmacies.

Also in 2026 Saldaña sponsored a bill written by Washington state senator Jeff Wilson officially adopt "the evergreen state" as the state nickname.
