= Jeff Holy =

American politician, lawyer, and police officer

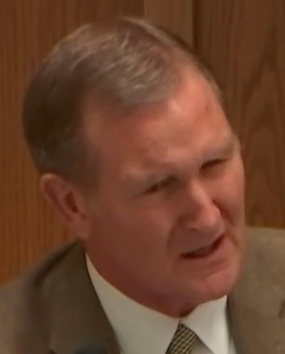
- Holy in 2019

Member of the Washington State Senate from the 6th district
- Incumbent
- Assumed office January 14, 2019
- Preceded by: Michael Baumgartner

Member of the Washington House of Representatives from the 6th district
- In office January 14, 2013 – January 14, 2019
- Preceded by: John Ahern
- Succeeded by: Jenny Graham

Personal details
- Born: Jeffrey Mark Holy; October 25, 1955 (age 70) Minneapolis, Minnesota, U.S.
- Party: Republican
- Spouse: Cynthia Ann "Cindy" (Eastham) Holy
- Children: Two
- Education: Washington State University (BS); Gonzaga University (JD)
- Profession: Police officer Police detective Lawyer
- Website: Official

Military service
- Allegiance: United States
- Branch/service: Washington Army National Guard
- Years of service: 1975–1978; 1981–1982

Jeffrey Mark Holy, Sr. (born October 25, 1955) is an American politician, lawyer, and police officer currently serving as a member of the Washington State Senate for the 6th legislative district. A Republican, he previously served as a member of the Washington House of Representatives. Prior to entering politics, Holy was a police officer with the Spokane Police Department.

On February 23, 2024 in a vote of 48 to 1, the Washington State Senate passed a bill to end child marriage, sending the bill to Governor Jay Inslee’s desk for signature. Holy was the only no vote.

== Education ==
Holy graduated from Washington State University in 1983 and received a JD from Gonzaga University School of Law in 1989.

== Personal life ==
Holy's wife is Cindy Holy. They have two children.

== See also ==
- Kent Pullen
