= Washington's 29th legislative district =

American legislative district

Coordinates: 47°8′N 122°25′W

Map of Washington's 29th legislative district

Washington's 29th legislative district is one of forty-nine districts in Washington state for representation in the state legislature. It includes most of Tacoma.

The district's legislators are state senator Steve Conway and state representatives Melanie Morgan (position 1) and Sharlett Mena (position 2), all Democrats.

== See also ==
- Washington Redistricting Commission
- Washington State Legislature
- Washington State Senate
- Washington House of Representatives
