= Jesse Salomon =

American politician from Washington

Member of the Washington State Senate from the 32nd district
- Incumbent
- Assumed office January 14, 2019
- Preceded by: Maralyn Chase

Personal details
- Born: Jesse Michael Salomon; 1976 (age 49–50)
- Party: Democratic
- Education: Western Washington University (BA); University of Washington School of Law (JD)

Jesse Michael Salomon (born 1976) is an American politician who is a member of the Washington State Senate. He represents the 32nd district and is a Democrat.

== Career ==
Salomon was elected to his state senate seat on November 6, 2018. He secured sixty-nine percent of the vote while incumbent Democrat Maralyn Chase secured thirty-one percent. Salomon is based in Shoreline, Washington.
