= Washington State Legislature =

Bicameral legislature of Washington State

Type
- Type: Bicameral
- Houses: Senate; House of Representatives

Leadership
- Senate President: Denny Heck (D) since January 13, 2021
- Senate President pro tempore: Steve Conway (D) since January 13, 2025
- House Speaker: Laurie Jinkins (D) since January 13, 2020

Structure
- Seats: 147; 49 senators 98 representatives
- Senate political groups: Majority: Democratic (30); Minority: Republican (19)
- House of Representatives political groups: Majority: Democratic (59); Minority: Republican (39)

Elections
- Last Senate election: November 5, 2024 (24 seats)
- Last House of Representatives election: November 5, 2024 (98 seats)
- Next Senate election: November 3, 2026 (25 seats)
- Next House of Representatives election: November 3, 2026 (98 seats)

Meeting place
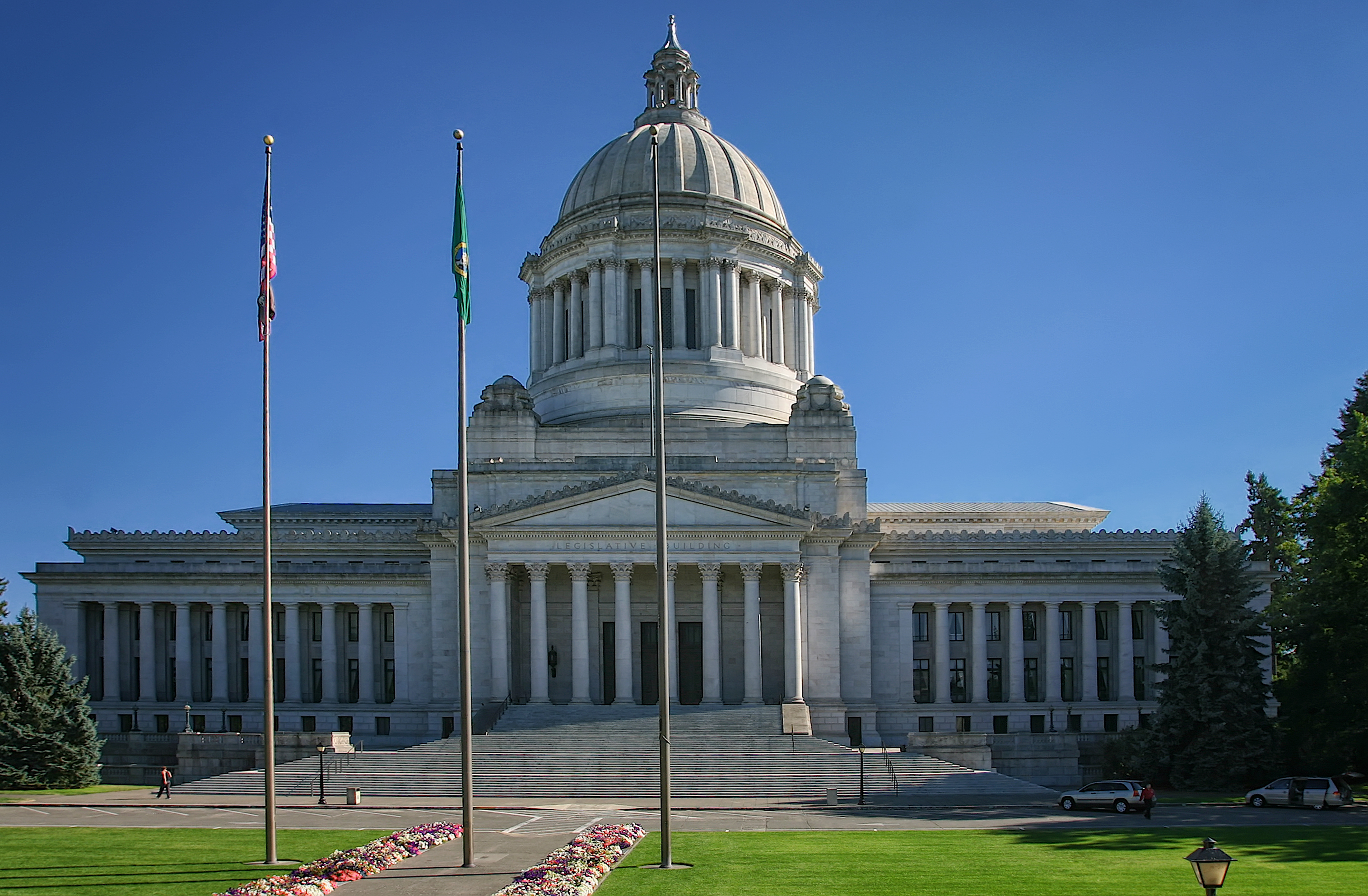
- Washington State Capitol; Olympia

Website
- leg.wa.gov

The Washington State Legislature is the state legislature of the State of Washington. It is a bicameral body, composed of the lower Washington House of Representatives, composed of 98 representatives, and the upper Washington State Senate, with 49 senators plus the lieutenant governor acting as president.

The state is divided into 49 legislative districts, each of which elect one senator and two representatives. Senators and the lieutenant governor are elected to four-year terms while representatives are elected to two-year terms.

The state legislature meets in the Legislative Building at the Washington State Capitol in Olympia.

As of January 2025, Democrats control both houses of the Washington State Legislature. Democrats hold a 59–39 majority in the House of Representatives and a 30–19 majority in the Senate.

== History ==
The Washington State Legislature traces its origins to the creation of the Washington Territory in 1853. The territory was formed after settlers living north of the Columbia River persuaded the U.S. federal government to allow them to legally separate from Oregon Territory. The Washington Territorial Assembly, as the newly created area's bicameral legislature, convened the following year. The legislature represented settlers from the Strait of Juan de Fuca to modern Montana.

=== Women's suffrage ===
Disagreements within the legislature regarding women's suffrage began shortly after the body was established. Legislators who supported women's suffrage believed that granting women the right to vote would encourage female migration from the Eastern United States to Washington Territory. In 1854, six years after the Seneca Falls Convention, the issue was brought to a vote by the legislature. Women's suffrage was defeated in a tied vote of 9 to 9; the bill needed at least 10 votes to pass. One legislator voted against the bill, noting that its provisions would have disenfranchised his Native American wife due to racial restrictions.

In 1871 Susan B. Anthony and Thurston County Representative Daniel Bigelow addressed the legislature on the issue. In 1883, the issue returned to the floor, this time with the Territorial Assembly successfully passing the 1883 Woman Suffrage Act, granting universal suffrage for women. The law was the first in United States history to grant female African Americans the right to vote.

In the 1887 case Harland v. Territory of Washington, the Supreme Court of Washington Territory declared the 1883 Woman Suffrage Act unconstitutional, invalidating women's suffrage. An attempt by the legislature to re-grant universal women's suffrage was overturned in 1888.

After two failed voter referendums in 1889 and 1897, activism led by Emma Smith DeVoe and May Arkwright Hutton, among others, led the state legislature to approve the state constitutional amendment granting full female voting rights, which Washington's (male) voters ratified in 1910 by a vote of 52,299 to 29,676.

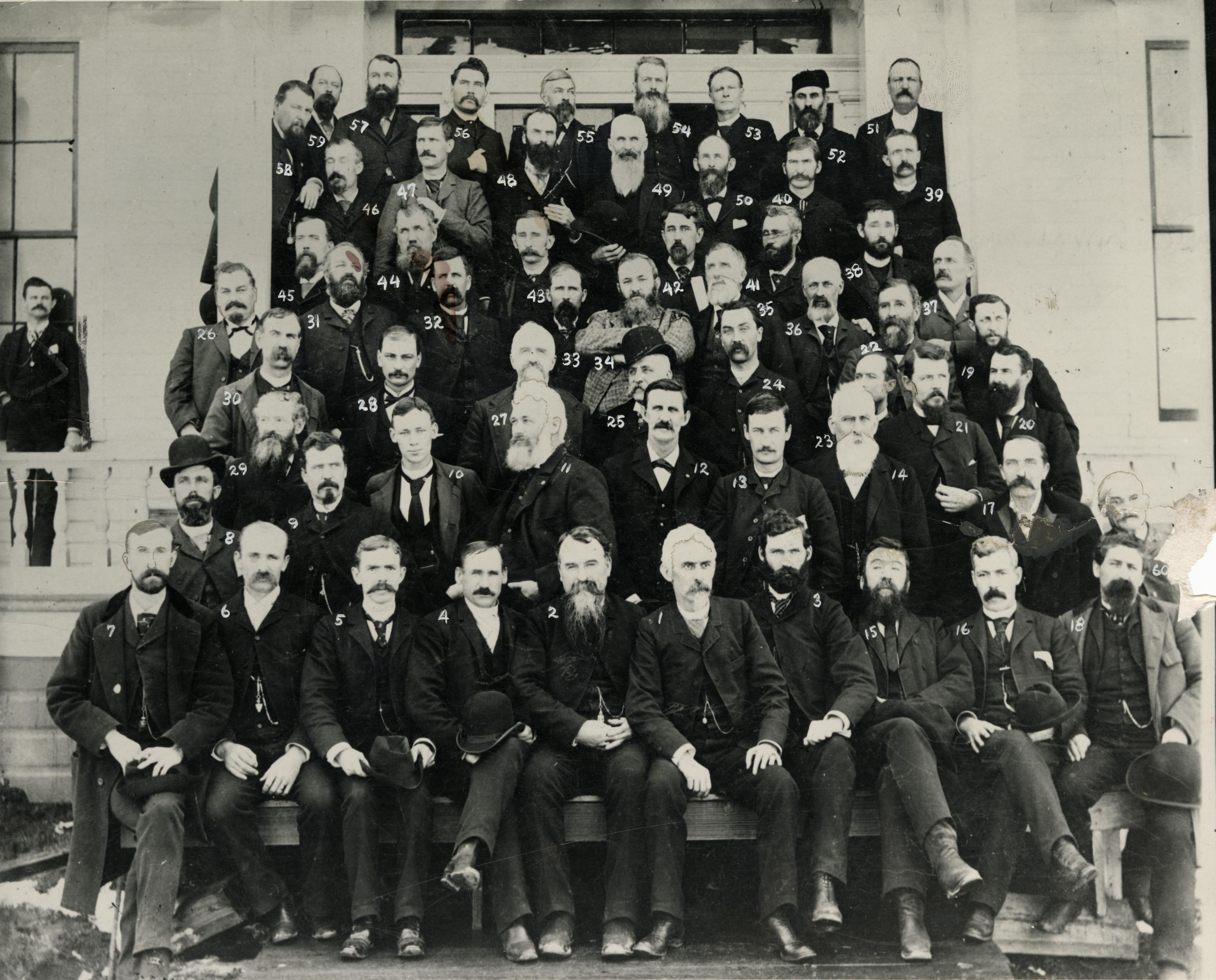
Members of Washington's first legislature, November 1889

=== Statehood ===
With more than two decades of pressure on federal authorities to authorize statehood, on February 22, 1889, the U.S. Congress passed the Enabling Act, signed into law by outgoing President Grover Cleveland, authorizing the territories of Washington, North Dakota, South Dakota, and Montana to form state governments. The Territorial Assembly set out to convene a constitutional convention to write a state constitution.

Following its successful passage by the legislature, Washington voters approved the new document on October 1. On November 11, 1889, President Benjamin Harrison authorized Washington to become the 42nd state of United States. It was the last West Coast state of the Continental U.S. to achieve statehood. The modern Washington State Legislature was created.

== Meetings ==
The bicameral body is composed of legislators, beginning the legislative session annually on the second Monday in January. In odd-numbered years, when the state budget is debated upon, the State Legislature meets for 105 days, and in even-numbered years for 60 days. The Governor of Washington can call legislators in for a special 30-day session at any time. Legislators also can call themselves into special session by a two-thirds vote by both the House of Representatives and the State Senate.

=== Television coverage ===
Debates within both the House and Senate, as well as committee meetings and other special events within or relating to the legislature are broadcast throughout Washington on TVW, the state public affairs network.

== Redistricting ==
The Washington legislature is redistricted once every 10 years following the decennial census. The state uses a bipartisan redistricting commission typically made up of two Democrats and two Republicans with one non-voting chair. The commission must approve a map by November 15 of the year after the census. Once the map is approved by the commission, the legislature has 30 days from the start of the next legislative session to make any adjustments, which must be approved by a two-thirds vote in both houses of the legislature.

== Vacancies ==
In Washington, special elections to fill vacancies for partisan offices may only be held during the November general election. The vacancy must occur before the beginning of the filing period in early May in order to appear on that November's ballot; otherwise, the special election is not held until the following year. If there was already a regularly scheduled election for that office in the same year that the vacancy occurred, the special and regular election take place simultaneously appearing once on the ballot with the winner beginning their term as soon as their election is certified by the Secretary of State.

Until the special election can be held, an appointee fills the seat. If the district is entirely within one county, the county central committee of the political party that last held the seat in the county that contains the district calls a meeting of the Precinct Committee Officers who reside in the district to nominate three candidates and the board of county commissioners chooses among them. Where a district spans counties, the state central committee of the party calls and runs the meeting of the Precinct Committee Officers who nominate the three candidates from which the boards of county commissioners of all the counties jointly choose one.

== Compensation ==
As of July 2025, legislators receive an annual salary of $67,688. The Speaker of the House and Senate majority leader receive salaries of $75,688; the House and Senate minority leaders receive salaries of $71,688.

== See also ==
- Washington State Capitol
- Washington House of Representatives
- Washington State Senate
- List of Washington state legislatures
