= Phil Fortunato =

American businessman and politician

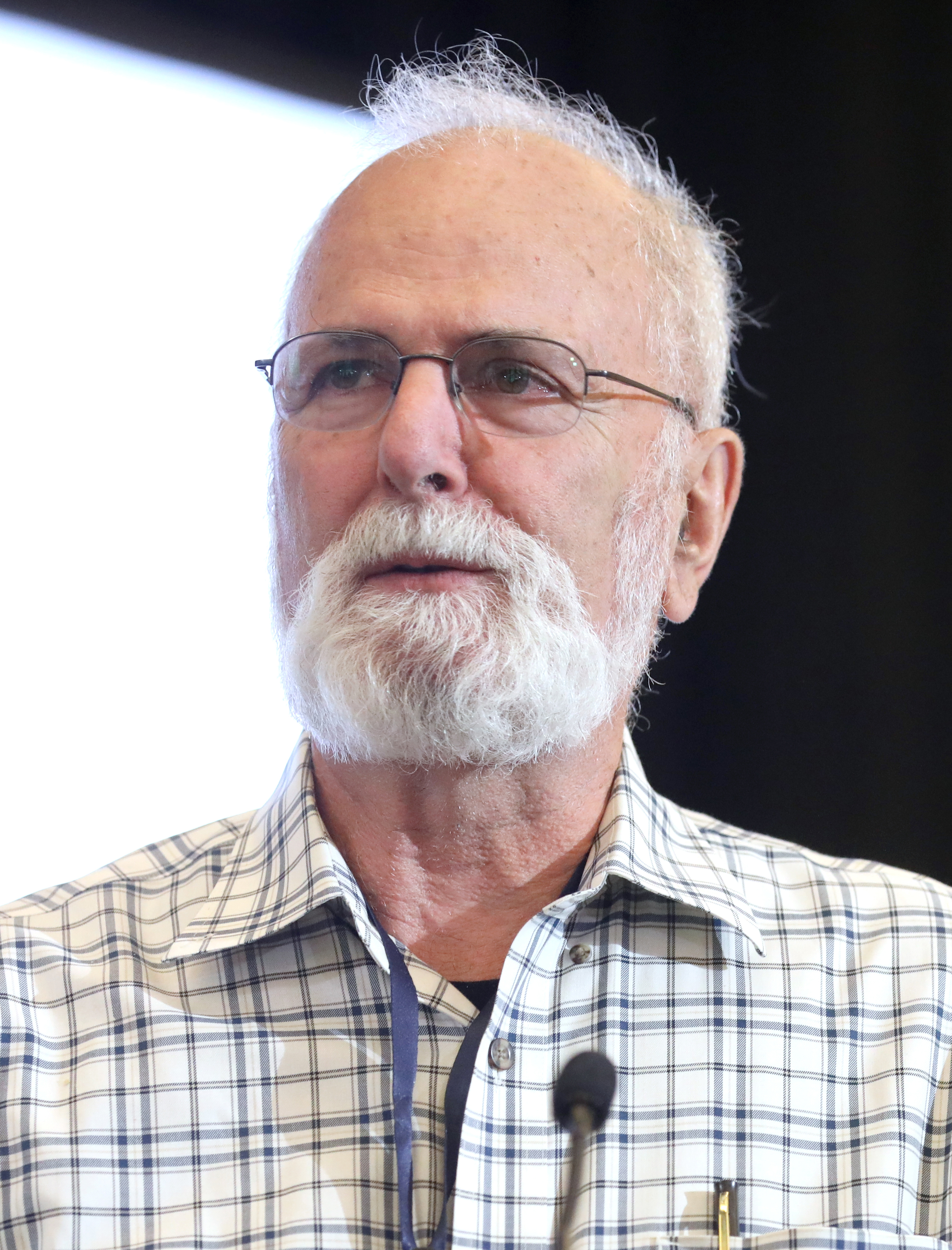

Member of the Washington State Senate from the 31st district
- Incumbent
- Assumed office January 7, 2017
- Preceded by: Pam Roach

Member of the Washington House of Representatives from the 47th district
- In office January 11, 1999 – January 8, 2001
- Preceded by: Suzette Cooke
- Succeeded by: Geoff Simpson

Personal details
- Born: 1953 or 1954 (age 71–72)
- Party: Republican
- Spouse: Suzanne Fortunato
- Children: 5
- Education: Rutgers University, New Brunswick
- Website: State Senate website Campaign website

Philip D. Fortunato (born 1953 or 1954) is an American businessman and politician serving as a member of the Washington State Senate, representing the 31st district, based in southeast King County and northeast Pierce County since 2017. A member of the Republican Party, he previously served as a member of the Washington House of Representatives, representing the 47th district from 1999 to 2001 and ran for Governor of Washington in the 2020 election, coming in sixth place in the primary with just under 4% of the vote. Fortunato also ran for state Insurance Commissioner in 2024 and lost to Democratic state Senator Patty Kuderer by 13 percentage points.

== Personal life ==
Fortunato and his wife Suzanne have five children. Fortunato and his family live in Auburn, Washington.
