= Claire Wilson (politician) =

American educator and politician from Washington

Member of the Washington State Senate from the 30th district
- Incumbent
- Assumed office January 14, 2019
- Preceded by: Mark Miloscia

Personal details
- Born: 1956 (age 69–70) Ellensburg, Washington
- Party: Democratic
- Children: 2
- Education: Washington State University (BA); University of Northern Colorado (MA)
- Website: sdc.wastateleg.org/wilson/

Claire E. Wilson (born 1956) is an American educator and politician from the state of Washington. She is a Democratic member of the Washington State Senate, representing Washington's 30th legislative district, an area that includes Federal Way, Algona, Auburn, Pacific, Milton, and Des Moines.

== Early life and education ==
Wilson grew up in Seattle and attended Roosevelt High School. She earned her BA in Food and Nutrition/Child and Family Studies from Washington State University before graduating from the University of Northern Colorado with her MA in Vocational Home Economics/Adult Education.

== Career ==
After earning her Master's she became a Program Director for the Special Supplemental Nutrition Program for Women, Infants and Children program run through the Missoula County Health Department in rural Hamilton, Montana.

Wilson then moved back to Washington where she was a nutrition educator for a county-wide child and adult care food program and taught pregnant and parenting teens through at Mount Tahoma High School for ten years.

She later worked as a senior grants and contracts manager for the teen parent programs through the City of Seattle and spent the next 25 years working for the Puget Sound Educational Service District. She specialized in early care and education, school and community partnerships, and cross system/cross sector program implementation and administration. Wilson started out as a Parent Involvement Coordinator and ended her career as the Executive Director of Early Learning and Executive Director of Policy, Governance, and School/Family/Community Partnerships.

Throughout her career Wilson has served on, and volunteered for numerous organizations and boards including PTA, Citizens for Federal Way Schools, Building Better Futures Board, the Advisory Board of the Washington Family Engagement Trust, and The Sidekick Collective.

== Political career ==
=== As school board director ===
Wilson was elected as School Board Director, District 2 for the Federal Way Public Schools Board of Education in 2011. Serving two terms, she resigned her position in March 2019 after being elected to the Washington State Senate.

=== As state senator ===
As a legislator, Wilson has championed early care and education and criminal justice reform. She has passed legislation providing access to child care for parents attending high school and legislation expanding eligibility to the Early Childhood Education and Assistance Program (ECEAP). Wilson sponsored the Attorney General of Washington request bill ending the use of solitary confinement as punishment for youth and a bill providing postsecondary education opportunities in the Department of Corrections. Wilson also introduced and passed the comprehensive sexual health education bill.

Wilson is Vice Chair of the Senate Early Learning & K-12 Committee. She also serves on the Human Services, Reentry & Rehabilitation Committee and the Transportation Committee. In 2019, Wilson was elected by her colleagues to serve as Assistant Majority Whip.

In the 2022 general election, Wilson was re-elected with over 58% of the votes cast.

== Personal life ==
Wilson is the first openly lesbian State Senator in the history of the state. She took office alongside the first openly queer State Senator, Emily Randall (D-26) and is one of seven LGBTQ members of the Washington State Legislature.
