= Steve Conway (politician) =

American politician (born 1944)

President pro tempore of the Washington State Senate
- Incumbent
- Assumed office January 13, 2025
- Preceded by: Karen Keiser

Member of the Washington State Senate from the 29th district
- Incumbent
- Assumed office January 10, 2011
- Preceded by: Rosa Franklin

Member of the Washington House of Representatives from the 29th district
- In office January 27, 1993 – January 10, 2011
- Preceded by: Rosa Franklin
- Succeeded by: Connie Ladenburg

Personal details
- Born: Steven Edward Conway; October 5, 1944 (age 81) Ontario, Oregon, U.S.
- Party: Democratic
- Spouse: Georgia Conway
- Education: University of Portland (BA); University of Oregon (MA, PhD); London School of Economics (attended)
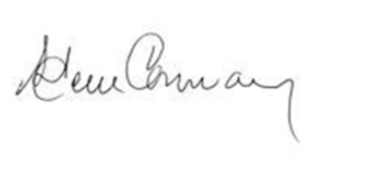
- Signature
- Website: State Senate website

Steven Edward Conway (born October 5, 1944) is an American politician serving as a member of the Washington State Senate. He was first elected to the senate in 2010 after the retirement of Rosa Franklin, and previously represented District 29 of the Washington House of Representatives for 18 years.

Washington State Senate
Preceded by Karen Keiser	President pro tempore of the Washington Senate; 2025–present	Incumbent
