= Washington's 36th legislative district =

American legislative district

Coordinates: 47°40′N 122°23′W

Map of Washington's 36th legislative district

Washington's 36th legislative district is one of forty-nine districts in Washington state for representation in the state legislature. It encompasses part of northwestern Seattle, including the neighborhoods of Ballard, Magnolia, and Queen Anne.

The district's legislators are state senator Noel Frame and state representatives Julia Reed (position 1) and Liz Berry (position 2), all Democrats.

== See also ==
- Washington Redistricting Commission
- Washington State Legislature
- Washington State Senate
- Washington House of Representatives
