= Washington State Senate =

Upper house of the Washington State Legislature

Coordinates: 47.0358°N 122.9045°W

- Washington State Legislature

Type
- Type: Upper chamber
- Term limits: None

History
- New session started: January 9, 2023

Leadership
- President: Denny Heck (D) since January 13, 2021
- President pro tempore: Steve Conway (D) since January 13, 2025
- Majority Leader: Jamie Pedersen (D) since January 13, 2025
- Minority Leader: John Braun (R) since November 30, 2020

Structure
- Seats: 49
- Political groups: Majority: Democratic (30); Minority: Republican (19)
- Length of term: 4 years
- Authority: Article II, Washington State Constitution
- Salary: $72,494/year + per diem

Elections
- Last election: November 3, 2026 (25 seats)
- Next election: November 7, 2028 (24 seats)
- Redistricting: Washington Redistricting Commission

Meeting place
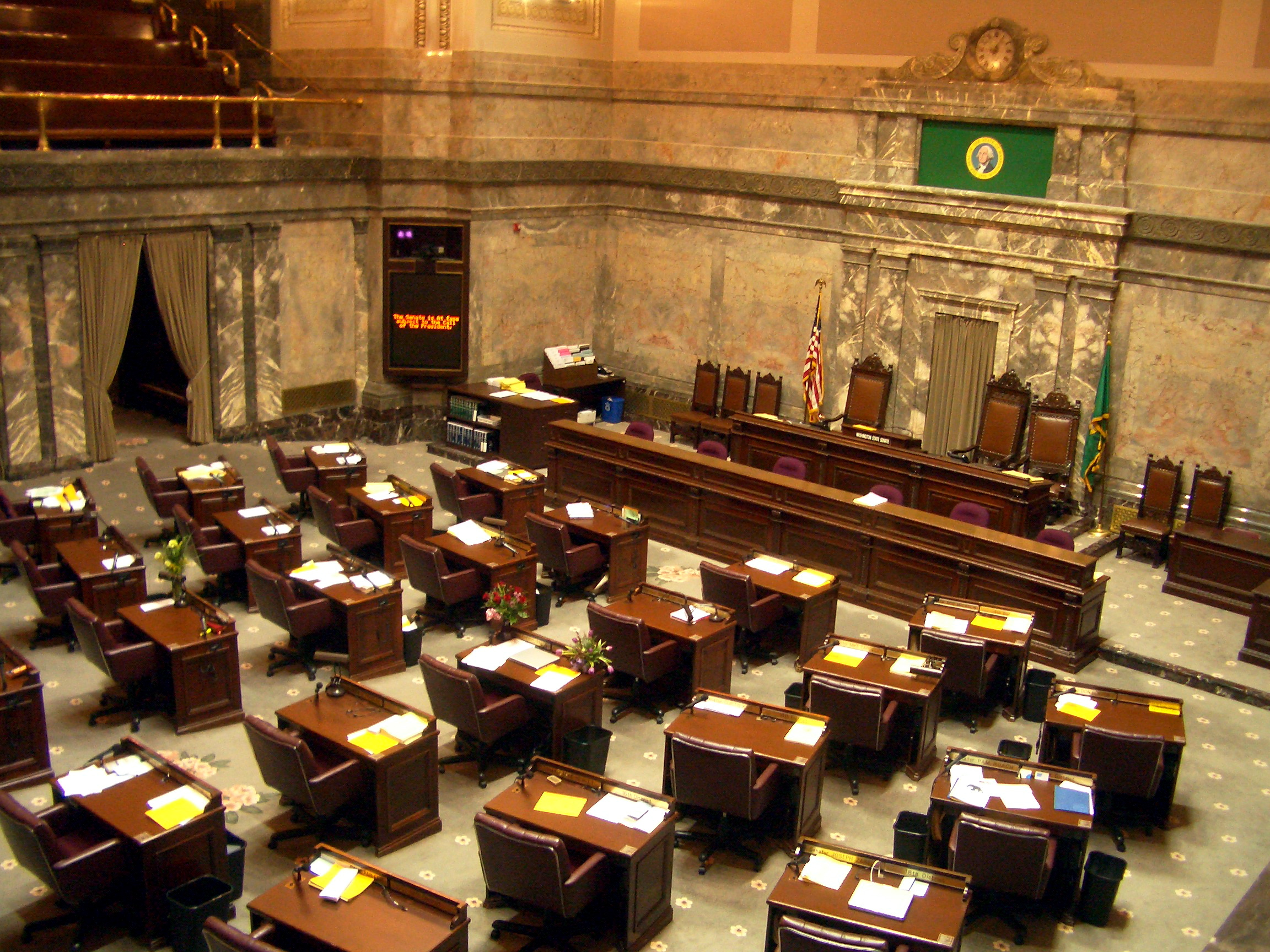
- State Senate Chamber; Washington State Capitol; Olympia, Washington

Website
- leg.wa.gov/senate

The Washington State Senate is the upper house of the Washington State Legislature. The body consists of 49 members, each representing a district with a population of approximately 160,000. The state senate meets at the Legislative Building in Olympia.

As with the lower House of Representatives, state senators serve without term limits, and senators serve four-year terms. Senators are elected from the same legislative districts as House members, with each district electing one senator and two representatives. Terms are staggered so that half the Senate is up for reelection every two years.

Like other upper houses of state and territorial legislatures and the federal U.S. Senate, the state senate can confirm or reject gubernatorial appointments to the state cabinet, commissions, and boards.

== Leadership ==
The state constitution allows both houses to write their own rules of procedure (article II, section 9) and to elect their own officers (article II, section 10) with the proviso that the lieutenant governor may preside in each house and has a deciding vote in the Senate, but that the Senate may choose a "temporary president" in the absence of the lieutenant governor. The prevailing two-party system has produced current senate rules to the effect that the president pro tempore is nominated by the majority party caucus and elected by the entire Senate.

Lieutenant Governor Denny Heck is constitutionally the president of the Senate. The current president pro tempore is Steve Conway. The majority leader is Democrat Jamie Pedersen. The minority leader is Republican John Braun.

== Composition ==
Affiliation	Party (Shading indicates majority caucus)		Total	Vacant
Affiliation	Democratic	Republican	Total	Vacant
End of previous legislature	29	20	49	0
Begin 69th legislature	30	19	49	0
April 19, 2025	29	19	48	1
June 3, 2025	30	19	49	0
Latest voting share	61.2%	38.8%		

=== Members (2025–2027, 69th Legislature) ===
District	Name	Party	Residence	Counties	First Election	Next Election
1	Derek Stanford	Democratic	Maltby	King (part), Snohomish (part)	2019 (Note: Originally appointed.)	2028
2	Jim McCune	Republican	Graham	Pierce (part), Thurston (part)	2020	2028
3	Marcus Riccelli	Democratic	Spokane	Spokane (part)	2024	2028
4	Leonard Christian	Republican	Spokane Valley	Spokane (part)	2024	2028
5	Victoria Hunt	Democratic	Issaquah	King (part)	2025	2028
6	Jeff Holy	Republican	Spokane	Spokane (part)	2018	2026
7	Shelly Short	Republican	Addy	Douglas (part), Ferry, Grant (part), Okanogan (part), Pend Oreille, Spokane (part), Stevens	2017	2026
8	Matt Boehnke	Republican	Kennewick	Benton (part), Franklin (part)	2022	2026
9	Mark Schoesler	Republican	Ritzville	Adams (part), Asotin, Columbia, Franklin (part), Garfield, Lincoln, Spokane (part), Whitman	2004	2028
10	Ron Muzzall	Republican	Oak Harbor	Island, Skagit (part), Snohomish (part)	2019	2028
11	Bob Hasegawa	Democratic	Seattle	King (part)	2012	2028
12	Keith Goehner	Republican	Dryden	Chelan, Douglas (part), King (part), Snohomish (part)	2024	2028
13	Judy Warnick	Republican	Moses Lake	Grant (part), Kittitas, Yakima (part)	2014	2026
14	Curtis King	Republican	Yakima	Klickitat, Yakima (part)	2007 (Note: Originally elected in a special election.)	2028
15	Nikki Torres	Republican	Pasco	Adams (part), Benton (part), Franklin (part), Grant (part), Yakima (part)	2022	2026
16	Perry Dozier	Republican	Waitsburg	Benton (part), Walla Walla	2020	2028
17	Paul Harris	Republican	Vancouver	Clark (part), Skamania	2024	2028
18	Adrian Cortes	Democratic	La Center	Clark (part)	2024	2028
19	Jeff Wilson	Republican	Longview	Cowlitz (part), Grays Harbor (part), Lewis (part), Pacific, Thurston (part), Wahkiakum	2020	2028
20	John Braun	Republican	Centralia	Clark (part), Cowlitz (part), Lewis (part), Thurston (part)	2012	2028
21	Marko Liias	Democratic	Lynnwood	Snohomish (part)	2014	2026
22	Jessica Bateman	Democratic	Olympia	Thurston (part)	2024	2028
23	Drew Hansen	Democratic	Bainbridge Island	Kitsap (part)	2023	2028
24	Mike Chapman	Democratic	Port Angeles	Clallam, Grays Harbor (part), Jefferson	2024 (Note: Sworn in early to fill vacant seat.)	2028
25	Chris Gildon	Republican	Puyallup	Pierce (part)	2020	2028
26	Deborah Krishnadasan	Democratic	Gig Harbor	Kitsap (part), Pierce (part)	2024	2026
27	Yasmin Trudeau	Democratic	Tacoma	Pierce (part)	2021	2028
28	T'wina Nobles	Democratic	Fircrest	Pierce (part)	2020	2028
29	Steve Conway	Democratic	Tacoma	Pierce (part)	2010	2026
30	Claire Wilson	Democratic	Auburn	King (part)	2018	2026
31	Phil Fortunato	Republican	Auburn	King (part), Pierce (part)	2017	2026
32	Jesse Salomon	Democratic	Shoreline	King (part), Snohomish (part)	2018	2026
33	Tina Orwall	Democratic	Des Moines	King (part)	2024	2026
34	Emily Alvarado	Democratic	West Seattle	King (part)	2025	2026
35	Drew MacEwen	Republican	Union	Kitsap (part), Mason, Thurston (part)	2022	2026
36	Noel Frame	Democratic	Seattle	King (part)	2022	2026
37	Rebecca Saldaña	Democratic	Seattle	King (part)	2016	2026
38	June Robinson	Democratic	Everett	Snohomish (part)	2020	2026
39	Keith Wagoner	Republican	Sedro-Woolley	Skagit (part), Snohomish (part)	2018	2028
40	Liz Lovelett	Democratic	Anacortes	San Juan, Skagit (part), Whatcom (part)	2019	2028
41	Lisa Wellman	Democratic	Mercer Island	King (part)	2016	2028
42	Sharon Shewmake	Democratic	Bellingham	Whatcom (part)	2022	2026
43	Jamie Pedersen	Democratic	Seattle	King (part)	2013	2026
44	John Lovick	Democratic	Mill Creek	Snohomish (part)	2021	2026
45	Manka Dhingra	Democratic	Redmond	King (part)	2017	2026
46	Javier Valdez	Democratic	Seattle	King (part)	2022	2026
47	Claudia Kauffman	Democratic	Kent	King (part)	2022	2026
48	Vandana Slatter	Democratic	Bellevue	King (part)	2025	2026
49	Annette Cleveland	Democratic	Vancouver	Clark (part)	2012	2028

== See also ==
- Washington State Capitol
- Washington State Legislature
- Washington House of Representatives
- List of Washington state legislatures
