= Washington's 15th legislative district =

American legislative district

Coordinates: 46°25′N 120°10′W

Washington's 15th legislative district map in 2024, after court-ordered redrawing

Washington's 15th legislative district is one of forty-nine districts in Washington state for representation in the state legislature. It includes portions of Adams, Benton, Franklin, Grant, and Yakima counties.

This semi-rural district is represented by state senator Nikki Torres and state representatives Chris Corry (position 1) and Jeremie Dufault (position 2), all Republicans.

The Washington State Redistricting Commission reorganized the district in 2021 to include a 51.5 percent Latino majority, which was determined to be in violation of the Voting Rights Act of 1965 by a U.S. District court judge. The 2023 ruling required the state commission to redraw the district in time for the 2024 legislative session. A revised map was approved by U.S. District judge Robert S. Lasnik in March 2024; it shifted the 15th district to cover the northern half of Yakima County and the 14th district for the rest of the county, where a Latino-heavy population resides. The new map included changes to 13 districts.
