= 2002 Washington State Senate election =

- November 5, 2002

24 out of 49 seats in the Washington State Senate 25 seats needed for a majority
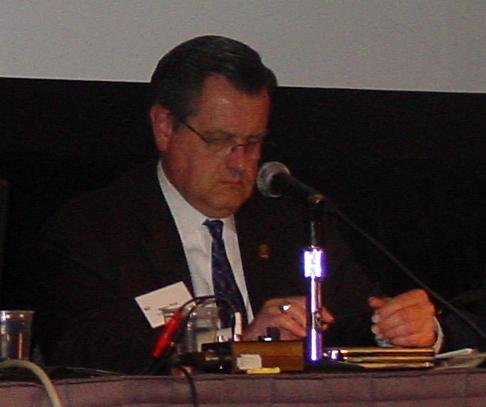

	Majority party	Minority party
Leader	James E. West	Sid Snyder (retired)
Party	Republican	Democratic
Leader since	January 10, 2000	January 9, 1995
Leader's seat	6th District-Spokane	19th District-Cowlitz
Last election	24	25
Seats after	25	24
Seat change	▲1	▼1
Popular vote	329,959	397,445
Percentage	43.86%	52.83%
Majority Leader before election
Sid Snyder
Democratic
Elected Majority Leader
James E. West
Republican

The 2002 Washington State Senate election was held on November 5, 2002, to determine which party would control the Washington State Senate for the following two years in the 58th Washington State Legislature. Twentyfour of the 49 senate seats were up for election. Prior to the election 25 seats were held by Democrats and 24 were held by Republicans. The general election saw Republicans flipping a single seat, thereby regaining the majority in the Washington State Senate that they had lost following the 1998 election.

== Predictions ==
Source	Ranking	As of
The Cook; Political Report	Tossup	October 4, 2002

== Retirements ==
1. 13th District: Harold Hochstatter (R) retired.
2. 38th District: Jeralita Costa (D) retired.
3. 44th District: Jeanine Long (R) retired.
4. 48th District: Dan McDonald (R) retired.

== Defeated incumbents ==
1. 42nd District: Georgia Gardner (D) lost re-election to Dale Brandland (R).

== Closest races ==
Seats where the margin of victory was under 10%:

1. District 26, 0.84%
2. District 6, 2.80%
3. District 42, 3.05% (gain)
4. District 31, 3.38%
5. District 44, 6.18%
6. District 30, 8.10%

== Results ==
=== 6th District ===
6th District election, 2002
Party	Candidate	Votes	%
Republican	James E. West (incumbent)	24,021	51.40%
Democratic	Laurie Dolan	22,716	48.60%
Total votes		46,737	100.0%
Republican hold			

=== 7th District ===
7th District election, 2002
Party	Candidate	Votes	%
Republican	Harry Morton (incumbent)	31,595	100.0%
Total votes		31,595	100.0%
Republican hold			

=== 8th District ===
8th District election, 2002
Party	Candidate	Votes	%
Republican	Pat Hale (incumbent)	24,574	100.0%
Total votes		24,574	100.0%
Republican hold			

=== 13th District ===
13th District election, 2002
Party	Candidate	Votes	%
Republican	Joyce Mulliken	25,015	100.0%
Total votes		25,015	100.0%
Republican hold			

=== 15th District ===
15th District election, 2002
Party	Candidate	Votes	%
Republican	Jim Honeyford (incumbent)	19,443	100.0%
Total votes		19,443	100.0%
Republican hold			

=== 21st District ===
21st District election, 2002
Party	Candidate	Votes	%
Democratic	Paull Shin (incumbent)	19,273	62.07%
Republican	Cheryl Potebnya	11,778	37.93%
Total votes		31,051	100.0%
Democratic hold			

=== 26th District ===
26th District election, 2002
Party	Candidate	Votes	%
Republican	Robert Oke (incumbent)	20,823	50.42%
Democratic	Betty Ringlee	20,480	49.58%
Total votes		41,303	100.0%
Republican hold			

=== 29th District ===
29th District election, 2002
Party	Candidate	Votes	%
Democratic	Rosa Franklin (incumbent)	16,141	100.0%
Total votes		16,141	100.0%
Democratic hold			

=== 30th District ===
30th District election, 2002
Party	Candidate	Votes	%
Democratic	Tracey Eide (incumbent)	15,474	54.05%
Republican	William Moore	13,154	45.95%
Total votes		28,628	100.0%
Democratic hold			

=== 31st District ===
31st District election, 2002
Party	Candidate	Votes	%
Republican	Pam Roach (incumbent)	18,017	51.69%
Democratic	Yvonne Ward	16,842	48.31%
Total votes		34,859	100.0%
Republican hold			

=== 32nd District ===
32nd District election, 2002
Party	Candidate	Votes	%
Democratic	Darlene Fairley (incumbent)	25,048	61.74%
Republican	Michael Plunkett	15,524	38.26%
Total votes		40,572	100.0%
Democratic hold			

=== 33rd District ===
33rd District election, 2002
Party	Candidate	Votes	%
Democratic	Karen Keiser (incumbent)	16,722	63.37%
Republican	James Russell	9,666	36.63%
Total votes		26,388	100.0%
Democratic hold			

=== 34th District ===
34th District election, 2002
Party	Candidate	Votes	%
Democratic	Erik Poulsen (incumbent)	29,719	63.37%
Total votes		29,719	100.0%
Democratic hold			

=== 35th District ===
35th District election, 2002
Party	Candidate	Votes	%
Democratic	Tim Sheldon (incumbent)	29,221	78.28%
Green	Marilou Rickert	8,109	21.72%
Total votes		37,330	100.0%
Democratic hold			

=== 36th District ===
36th District election, 2002
Party	Candidate	Votes	%
Democratic	Jeanne Kohl-Welles (incumbent)	35,334	100.0%
Total votes		35,334	100.0%
Democratic hold			

=== 37th District ===
37th District election, 2002
Party	Candidate	Votes	%
Democratic	Adam Kline (incumbent)	22,508	100.0%
Total votes		22,508	100.0%
Democratic hold			

=== 38th District ===
38th District election, 2002
Party	Candidate	Votes	%
Democratic	Aaron Reardon	17,809	65.34%
Republican	Glenn Coggeshell	9,445	34.66%
Total votes		27,253	100.0%
Democratic hold			

=== 42nd District ===
42nd District election, 2002
Party	Candidate	Votes	%
Republican	Dale Brandland	18,721	49.25%
Democratic	Georgia Gardner (incumbent)	17,565	46.20%
Green	Peter Tassoni	1,006	2.65%
Libertarian	Donald Crawford	724	1.90%
Total votes		38,016	100.0%
Republican gain from Democratic			

=== 43rd District ===
43rd District election, 2002
Party	Candidate	Votes	%
Democratic	Pat Thibaudeau (incumbent)	29,735	79.04%
Green	Linde Knighton	7,885	20.96%
Total votes		37,620	100.0%
Democratic hold			

=== 44th District ===
44th District election, 2002
Party	Candidate	Votes	%
Republican	Dave Schmidt	18,696	53.09%
Democratic	Phil Doerflein	16,520	46.91%
Total votes		35,216	100.0%
Republican hold			

=== 45th District ===
45th District election, 2002
Party	Candidate	Votes	%
Republican	Bill Finkbeiner (incumbent)	26,500	100.0%
Total votes		26,500	100.0%
Republican hold			

=== 46th District ===
46th District election, 2002
Party	Candidate	Votes	%
Democratic	Ken Jacobsen (incumbent)	31,919	100.0%
Total votes		31,919	100.0%
Democratic hold			

=== 47th District ===
47th District election, 2002
Party	Candidate	Votes	%
Republican	Stephen L. Johnson (incumbent)	17,997	55.52%
Democratic	Deborah Jacobson	14,419	44.48%
Total votes		32,416	100.0%
Republican hold			

=== 48th District ===
48th District election, 2002
Party	Candidate	Votes	%
Republican	Luke Esser	24,990	77.51%
Libertarian	Christine Lawniczak	7,252	22.49%
Total votes		32,242	100.0%
Republican hold			
