= 2006 Washington State Senate election =

Washington State Senate elections, 2006
- November 7, 2006

24 seats of the Washington State Senate 25 seats needed for a majority
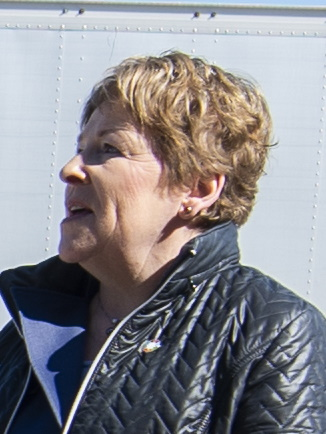

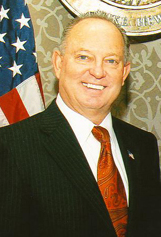
| | Majority party | Minority party |
|---|---|---|
| Leader | Lisa Brown | Mike Hewitt |
| Party | Democratic | Republican |
| Leader's seat | 3rd-Spokane | 16th-Walla Walla |
| Last election | 26 | 23 |
| Seats won | 32 | 17 |
| Seat change | ▲6 | ▼6 |
- Results: Democratic gain Democratic hold Republican hold No election
Majority Leader before election
Lisa Brown
Democratic
Elected Majority Leader
Lisa Brown
Democratic

The 2006 Elections in Washington include races for the US Senate, US House and Washington State Legislature. This page tracks incumbents and challengers for the Washington State Senate.

== Predictions ==
| Source | Ranking | As of |
|---|---|---|
| Rothenberg | Lean D | November 4, 2006 |

== Results ==
| State Senate District | Incumbent | Party | Elected Senator | Party |
|---|---|---|---|---|
| 6th | Bradley Benson | Rep | Christopher Marr | Dem |
| 7th | Harry Morton | Rep | Harry Morton | Rep |
| 8th | Jerome Delvin | Rep | Jerome Delvin | Rep |
| 13th | Joyce Mulliken | Rep | Janea Holmquist | Rep |
| 15th | James Honeyford | Rep | James Honeyford | Rep |
| 21st | Paull Shin | Dem | Paull Shin | Dem |
| 26th | Bob Oke | Rep | Derek Kilmer | Dem |
| 29th | Rosa Franklin | Dem | Rosa Franklin | Dem |
| 30th | Tracey Eide | Dem | Tracey Eide | Dem |
| 31st | Pam Roach | Dem | Pam Roach | Rep |
| 32nd | Darlene Fairley | Dem | Darlene Fairley | Dem |
| 33rd | Karen Keiser | Dem | Karen Keiser | Dem |
| 34th | Erik Poulsen | Dem | Erik Poulsen | Dem |
| 35th | Timothy Sheldon | Dem | Timothy Sheldon | Dem |
| 36th | Jeanne Kohl-Welles | Dem | Jeanne Kohl-Welles | Dem |
| 37th | Adam Kline | Dem | Adam Kline | Dem |
| 38th | Jean Berkey | Dem | Jean Berkey | Dem |
| 42nd | Dale Brandland | Dem | Dale Brandland | Dem |
| 43rd | Patricia Thibaudeau | Dem | Edward Murray | Dem |
| 44th | Dave Schmidt | Rep | Steven Hobbs | Dem |
| 45th | Bill Finkbeiner | Rep | Eric Oemig | Dem |
| 46th | Ken Jacobsen | Dem | Ken Jacobsen | Dem |
| 47th | Stephen Johnson | Rep | Claudia Kauffman | Dem |
| 48th | Luke Esser | Rep | Rodney Tom | Dem |

Before the 2006 elections, Democrats held 26 of 49 seats in the state Senate, a 1-vote majority. Democrats successfully flipped five seats while Republicans flipped one, bringing the Democratic majority to 30 out of 49 seats.

== Results ==
| District | Incumbent | Party | Elected | Status | 2006 Candidates & Results |
|---|---|---|---|---|---|
| District 6 | Brad Benson | Republican | | Running | Brad Benson (R) 45.3% Chris Marr (D) (cw) 54.7% |
Republican Sen. Brad Benson, who served eight years in the state House of Representatives, won the Senate seat in 2004 after Jim West (R) resigned to become Spokane's mayor. He defeated West's replacement, Brian Murray, in the GOP primary and defeated Democrat Laurie Dolan, a former administrator for Spokane Public Schools who now serves as an adviser to Gov. Christine Gregoire, in the general election. Chris Marr has been the Chair of the Spokane Chamber of Commerce, a regent at Washington State University, State transportation commissioner, chair of both Deaconess and Valley hospitals, and has been a business owner for 20 years in Spokane. This is the first time since before World War II that this district has been represented by a Democrat.
| District 7 | Bob Morton | Republican | | Running | Bob Morton (R) 68% Chris Zaferes (D) 32% |
This was the first time that Bob Morton had been challenged by anyone since he first won the seat in 1994. The 7th District's Senate seat has been held by a Republican since 1982.
| District 8 | Jerome Delvin | Republican | | Running | Jerome Delvin (R) 100% |
Jerome Delvin was appointed in 2004 to replace Patricia Hale. He was challenged in 2004 by John David, and got 70.69% of the vote.
| District 13 | Joyce Mulliken | Republican | | Retiring | Janea Holmquist (R) 67.1% Lisa Bowen (D) 32.9% |
Joyce Mulliken, the Republican Deputy Whip, is not seeking re-election in 2006.
| District 15 | Jim Honeyford | Republican | | Running | Jim Honeyford (R) 62.5% Tomás A. Villanueva (D) 37.5% |
James Honeyford was unchallenged in 2002.
| District 21 | Paull Shin | Democrat | | Running | Paull Shin (D) 100% |
Paull Shin was challenged by Cheryl Potebnya in 2002, and received 62.07% of the vote.
| District 26 | Robert Oke | Republican | | Not Running | Jim Hines (R) 40% Derek Kilmer (D) 60% ~~Lois McMahan (R)~~ |
This is an open seat in the 2006 election. Robert Oke was challenged by Betty Ringlee in 2002, and received 50.42% of the vote. Oke is not seeking re-election in 2006. This year's contest could have been a rematch of a 2004 House race. Lois McMahan was previously a representative in the State House of Representatives, until she was unseated by Derek Kilmer that year. Kilmer won by 555 votes (with 49.67% of the vote).
| District 29 | Rosa Franklin | Democrat | | Running | Rosa Franklin (D) 100% |
Rosa Franklin was unchallenged in 2002.
| District 30 | Tracey J. Eide | Democrat | | Running | Tracey J. Eide (D) 59.5% Renee Maher (R) 40.5% |
Tracey Eide was challenged by William Moore in 2002, and received 54.05% of the vote.
| District 31 | Pam Roach | Republican | | Running | Pam Roach (R) 53.1% Yvonne Ward (R) 46.9% |
Pam Roach was challenged by Yvonne Ward in 2002, and received 51.69% of the vote.
| District 32 | Darlene Fairley | Democrat | | Running | Darlene Fairley (D) 67.6% David Baker (R) 46.9% ~~Chris Eggen (D)~~ |
Darlene Fairley was challenged by Michael Plunkett in 2002, and received 61.74% of the vote.
| District 33 | Karen Keiser | Democrat | | Running | Karen Keiser (D) 62.5% Karen Steele (R) 37.5% |
Karen Keiser was challenged by James Russell in 2002, and received 63.37% of the vote.
| District 34 | Erik Poulsen | Democrat | | Running | Erik Poulsen (D) 79.75% Paul Byrne (R) 20.25% |
Erik Poulsen was unchallenged in 2002.
| District 35 | Tim Sheldon | Democrat | | Running | Tim Sheldon (D) 72.3% Mark E. Shattuck (R) 27.7% ~~Kyle Taylor Lucas (D)~~ |
Tim Sheldon was challenged by Marilou Rickert of the Green Party in 2002, and received 78.28% of the vote.
| District 36 | Jeanne Kohl-Welles | Democrat | | Running | Jeanne Kohl-Welles (D) 100% |
Jeanne Kohl-Welles was unchallenged in 2002.
| District 37 | Adam Kline | Democrat | | Running | Adam Kline (D) 86.5% Brian Thomas (R) 13.5% |
Adam Kline was unchallenged in 2002.

=== District 38 ===
- Jean Berkey (D) - Incumbent

Jean Berkey was elected in 2002 into House Seat #2, and took the Senator position when Aaron Reardon took the position of Snohomish County Executive. Aaron was challenged by Glenn Coggeshell in 2002, and received 65.34% of the vote.

=== District 42 ===
- Dale E. Brandland (R) - Incumbent
- Jesse M. Salomon (D) - Challenger
  - Website: https://jessesalomonforstatesenate.blogspot.com/

Dale Brandland was challenged by Georgia Gardner (D), Peter Tassoni (G) and Donald Crawford (L) in 2002, and received 49.25% of the vote.

=== District 43 ===
- Pat Thibaudeau (D) - Incumbent, stepping down
- Rep. Ed Murray (D)
  - Ed Murray for State Senate
- Loren Nelson (R)

Ed Murray has served the 43rd district since 1995 in the Washington State House of Representatives.

Pat Thibaudeau was challenged by Linde Knighton (G) in 2002, and received 79.04% of the vote. She announced her retirement from the Senate in May 2006, after Murray had declared his intention to challenge her for the Democratic nomination.

=== District 44 ===
- Dave Schmidt (R) - Incumbent
- Steve Hobbs (D) - Challenger
  - Website: http://www.electhobbs.com/
- Lillian Kaufer (D) - Challenger
  - Website: https://web.archive.org/web/20060626071857/http://www.lillianforsenate.com/

David Schmidt was challenged by Phil Doerflein (D) in 2002 and received 53.09% of the vote.

=== District 45 ===
- Toby Nixon (R)
  - Website: http://www.tobynixon.com/
- Eric Oemig (D)
  - Website: https://web.archive.org/web/20151106032436/http://www.voteeric.com/

Incumbent Sen. Bill Finkbeiner has decided to step down, citing personal reasons. Rep. Toby Nixon has declared for the seat, leaving his House seat open.

=== District 46 ===
- Ken Jacobsen (D) - Incumbent
- Brian Travis (R)

Ken Jacobsen was unchallenged in 2002.

=== District 47 ===
- Mike Riley (R)
  - Website: https://web.archive.org/web/20060822040045/http://www.riley4senate.com/
- Ed Crawford (D)
  - Website: https://web.archive.org/web/20060627130145/http://www.edcrawfordforsenate.com/
- Claudia Kauffman (D)
  - Website: https://web.archive.org/web/20061008105722/http://www.claudiaforsenate.com/

Stephen Johnson was challenged by Deborah Jacobson in 2002, and received 55.52% of the vote. Johnson has decided to run for Washington State Supreme Court in 2006, making this an open seat.

Steve Reichert was previously running for the Republican nomination, but withdrew due to an "old injury that has flared up".

Ed Crawford recently retired as chief of the city of Kent Police Department.

=== District 48 ===
- Luke Esser (R) - Incumbent
- Rodney Tom (D) - Challenger
  - Rodney Tom is a 2 term Republican from the House in the 48th. On March 14, he announced that he would be seeking the Senate seat as a Democrat, asking challenger Debi Golden (www.debigolden.com) to step aside to avoid a primary election.
