= 2014 Washington State Senate election =

Washington State Senate elections, 2014
- November 4, 2014

25 seats of the Washington State Senate 25 seats needed for a majority
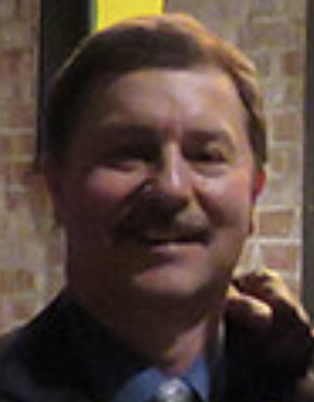

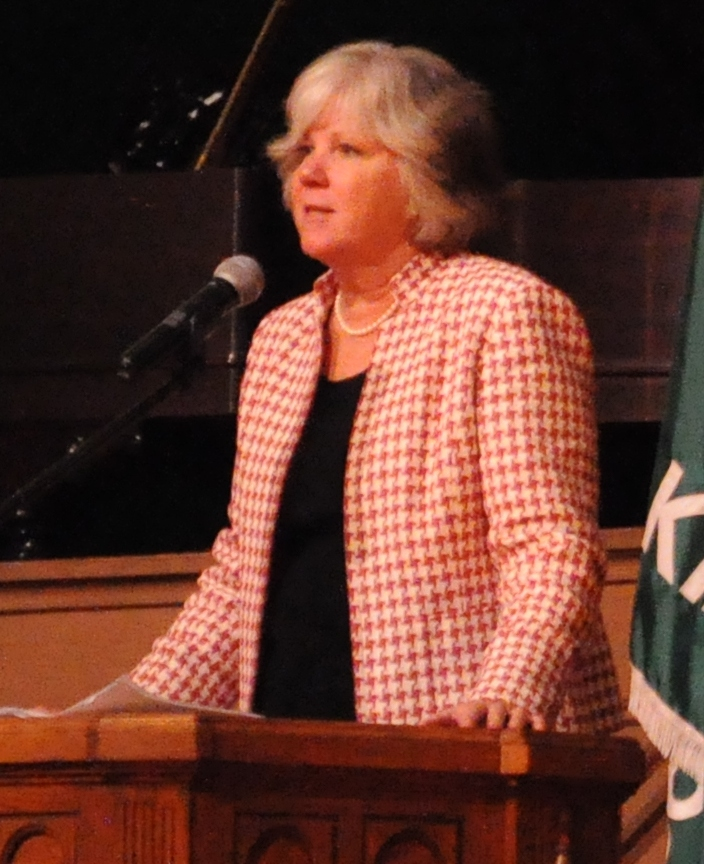
	Majority party	Minority party
Leader	Mark Schoesler	Sharon Nelson
Party	Majority Coalition Caucus (Note: Democrats Tim Sheldon and Rodney Tom caucused with all 23 Republicans to form the Majority Coalition Caucus back in 2012.)	Democratic
Leader's seat	9th-Ritzville	34th-Vashon
Last election	23 (Note: Republicans had won 23 seats during the 2012 election.)	26
Seats before	26	23
Seats after	26 (Note: Republicans won 25 seats in 2014. Democrat Tim Sheldon caucused with the Republicans.)	23
Seat change	Steady	Steady
- Results: Republican gain Democratic gain Republican hold Democratic hold Coalition Democrat Hold; No election
Majority Leader before election
Sharon Nelson
Democratic
Elected Majority Leader
Mark Schoesler
Republican (Coalition)

The 2014 Washington State Senate elections is one of the biennial legislative elections in Washington that took place on November 4, 2014. In this election, about half of the 49 legislative districts in Washington chose a state senator for a four-year term to the Washington State Senate. 24 seats were regularly scheduled to be up this cycle, along with 1 additional seat holding a special election to fill an unexpired term: the 28th district, held by appointed Senator Steve O'Ban, whose former incumbent Mike Carrell vacated the seat. Republicans had flipped another seat in a 2013 special election, giving them 24 seats heading into the 2014 elections, with two Democrats caucusing with them to provide them a majority.

A top two primary election on August 5, 2014, determined which candidates appear on the November ballot. Candidates were allowed to declare a party preference.

Republicans won the 30th district after Mark Miloscia switched parties and won re-election as a Republican. Democrats flipped the 48th district from a Democrat who caucused with the Republicans, Rodney Tom. While this kept the state senate at 26-23 in favor of the Majority Coalition Caucus, only one Democrat remained in the coalition.

== Overview ==
Senate Overall
Party	Seats	+/–
Democratic	23	0
Democrat caucusing with Republicans	1 (Note: Self-identified Democrat Tim Sheldon, who caucuses with the Republicans)	▼1
Republican	25	▲1
Total	49	

=== Composition ===
Elections	Seats
Democratic Incumbent and Uncontested	2
Democratic Incumbent vs. Democrat	1
Democratic Incumbent vs. Republican	7
Democratic Incumbent (caucusing with Republicans) vs. Democrat	1
Republican Incumbent vs. Democrat	8
Republican Incumbent vs. Republican	2
Contested, Open Seats (Note: Including open seats with two candidates of the same party competing in the general election.)	4
Total	25

== Predictions ==
Source	Ranking	As of
Governing	Lean R	October 20, 2014

== Select primary results ==
=== District 32 ===
Washington's 32nd legislative district election, 2014
Party	Candidate	Votes	%
Democratic	Maralyn Chase (inc.)	11,507	51.24
Democratic	Chris Eggen	5,343	23.79
Republican	Robert Reedy	5,606	24.96
Total votes			100

=== District 35 ===
Washington's 35th legislative district election, 2014
Party	Candidate	Votes	%
Majority Coalition Caucus	Tim Sheldon (inc.) (Note: Though he self-identifies as a Democrat, Senator Sheldon has caucused with the Republicans in the "Majority Coalition Caucus" since 10 December 2012 and has been disowned by Democratic organizations throughout the state and in his own district.)	9,706	33.3
Democratic	Irene Bowling	10,321	35.42
Republican	Travis Couture	9,116	31.28
Total votes			100

=== District 37 ===
Washington's 37th legislative district election, 2014
Party	Candidate	Votes	%
Democratic	Pramila Jayapal	11,815	53.91
Republican	Rowland Martin	2,273	10.37
Democratic	Sheley Secrest	2,204	10.06
Democratic	Claude Burfect	424	1.93
Democratic	John Stafford	1,639	7.48
Democratic	Louis Watanabe	3,562	16.25
Total votes		21,917	100
Democratic hold			

== General election results ==
Results as reported by the Secretary of State:

=== District 6 ===
Washington's 6th legislative district election, 2014
Party	Candidate	Votes	%
Republican	Michael Baumgartner (inc.)	28,309	57.47
Democratic	Rich Cowan	20,949	42.53
Total votes		49,258	100
Republican hold			

=== District 7 ===
Washington's 7th legislative district election, 2014
Party	Candidate	Votes	%
Republican	Brian Dansel (inc.)	32,702	72.17
Republican	Tony Booth	12,612	27.83
Total votes		45,314	100
Republican hold			

=== District 8 ===
Washington's 8th legislative district election, 2014
Party	Candidate	Votes	%
Republican	Sharon Brown (inc.)	30,552	74.15
Democratic	Doug McKinley	10,649	25.85
Total votes		41,201	100
Republican hold			

=== District 13 ===
Washington's 13th legislative district election, 2014
Party	Candidate	Votes	%
Republican	Judith (Judy) Warnick	30,751	86.33
Democratic	Mohammad Said	4,868	13.67
Total votes		35,619	100
Republican hold			

=== District 15 ===
Washington's 15th legislative district election, 2014
Party	Candidate	Votes	%
Republican	Jim Honeyford (inc.) (Note: Prefers G.O.P. Party)	16,794	72.76
Democratic	Gabriel Munoz	6,288	27.24
Total votes		23,082	100
Republican hold			

=== District 21 ===
Washington's 21st legislative district election, 2014
Party	Candidate	Votes	%
Democratic	Marko Liias (inc.)	20,227	54.52
Republican	Dan Matthews	16,871	45.48
Total votes		37,098	100
Democratic hold			

=== District 26 ===
Washington's 26th legislative district election, 2014
Party	Candidate	Votes	%
Republican	Jan Angel (Inc.)	29,077	58.75
Democratic	Judy Arbogast	20,414	41.25
Total votes		49,491	100
Republican hold			

=== District 28 ===
Washington's 28th legislative district election, 2014
Party	Candidate	Votes	%
Republican	Steve O'Ban (Inc.)	20,945	54.48
Democratic	Tami Green	17,503	45.52
Total votes		38,448	100
Republican hold			

=== District 29 ===
Washington's 29th legislative district election, 2014
Party	Candidate	Votes	%
Democratic	Steve Conway (inc.)	13,071	58.49
Republican	Terry Harder	9,277	41.51
Total votes		22,348	100
Democratic hold			

=== District 30 ===
Washington's 30th legislative district election, 2014
Party	Candidate	Votes	%
Republican	Mark Miloscia (Note: Formerly Democrat, switched parties in 2014)	17,266	55.60
Democratic	Shari Song	13,790	44.40
Total votes		31,056	100
Republican gain from Democratic			

=== District 31 ===
Washington's 31st legislative district election, 2014
Party	Candidate	Votes	%
Republican	Pam Roach (inc.)	21,226	53.67
Republican	Cathy Dahlquist	18,324	46.33
Total votes		39,550	100
Republican hold			

=== District 32 ===
Washington's 32nd legislative district election, 2014
Party	Candidate	Votes	%
Democratic	Maralyn Chase (inc.)	29,560	71.36
Republican	Robert Reedy	11,863	28.64
Total votes		41,423	100
Democratic hold			

=== District 33 ===
Washington's 33rd legislative district election, 2014
Party	Candidate	Votes	%
Democratic	Karen Keiser (inc.)	18,476	62.69
Republican	Martin Metz	10,994	37.31
Total votes		29,470	100
Democratic hold			

=== District 34 ===
Washington's 34th legislative district election, 2014
Party	Candidate	Votes	%
Democratic	Sharon Nelson (inc.)	34,436	100
Total votes		34,436	100
Democratic hold			

=== District 35 ===
Washington's 35th legislative district election, 2014
Party	Candidate	Votes	%
Majority Coalition Caucus	Tim Sheldon (inc.)	24,317	54.41
Democratic	Irene Bowling	20,375	45.59
Total votes		44,692	100
Majority Coalition Caucus hold			

=== District 36 ===
Washington's 36th legislative district election, 2014
Party	Candidate	Votes	%
Democratic	Jeanne Kohl-Welles (inc.)	47,025	84.19
Republican	Sarina Forbes	8,830	15.81
Total votes		55,855	100
Democratic hold			

=== District 37 ===
Washington's 37th legislative district election, 2014
Party	Candidate	Votes	%
Democratic	Pramila Jayapal	26,091	70.71
Democratic	Louis Watanabe	10,807	29.29
Total votes		36,898	100
Democratic hold			

=== District 38 ===
Washington's 38th legislative district election, 2014
Party	Candidate	Votes	%
Democratic	John McCoy (inc.)	19,414	61.88
Republican	Craig French	11,960	38.12
Total votes		31,374	100
Democratic hold			

=== District 42 ===
Washington's 42nd legislative district election, 2014
Party	Candidate	Votes	%
Republican	Doug Ericksen (inc.)	30,209	58.71
Democratic	Seth Fleetwood	21,244	41.29
Total votes		51,453	100
Republican hold			

=== District 43 ===
Washington's 43rd legislative district election, 2014
Party	Candidate	Votes	%
Democratic	Jamie Pedersen (inc.)	39,507	100
Total votes		39,507	100
Democratic hold			

=== District 44 ===
Washington's 44th legislative district election, 2014
Party	Candidate	Votes	%
Democratic	Steve Hobbs (inc.)	23,560	53.99
Republican	Jim Kellett	20,077	46.01
Total votes		43,637	100
Democratic hold			

=== District 45 ===
Washington's 45th legislative district election, 2014
Party	Candidate	Votes	%
Republican	Andy Hill (inc.)	25,816	52.72
Democratic	Matt Isenhower	23,156	47.28
Total votes		48,972	100
Republican hold			

=== District 46 ===
Washington's 46th legislative district election, 2014
Party	Candidate	Votes	%
Democratic	David Frockt (inc.)	41,318	79.84
Republican	Van Sperry	10,433	20.16
Total votes		51,751	100
Democratic hold			

=== District 47 ===
Washington's 47th legislative district election, 2014
Party	Candidate	Votes	%
Republican	Joe Fain (inc.)	21,730	63.62
Democratic	Carol Barber	12,428	36.38
Total votes		34,158	100
Republican hold			

=== District 48 ===
Washington's 48th legislative district election, 2014
Party	Candidate	Votes	%
Democratic	Cyrus Habib (Note: The previous state senator, Rodney Tom, self-identifies as a Democrat and was elected as such in 2006 and again in 2010. However, he began his career as a Republican in the state house before 2006, and has been functionally independent since 10 December 2012 when he (with fellow Democrat Tim Sheldon caucused with the Republicans in the "Majority Coalition Caucus"; Tom was thereafter disowned by Democratic organizations throughout the state and in his own district. For all practical purposes, he was a political independent, so Habib's election amounted to a Democratic gain over an independent.)	24,833	64.87
Republican	Michelle Darnell	13,446	35.13
Total votes		38,279	100
Democratic gain from Majority Coalition Caucus			
