= Majority Coalition Caucus =

Bipartisan caucus in the Washington Senate

Majority Coalition Caucus of the State of Washington
- President Pro Tempore of the Senate: Tim Sheldon (D) (2012–2015); Pam Roach (R) (2015–2017); Tim Sheldon (D) (2017)
- Senate Majority Leader: Rodney Tom (D) (2012–2014); Mark Schoesler (R) (2014–2017)
- Senate Republican Caucus Leader: Mark Schoesler (R)
- Founded: December 10, 2012
- Dissolved: November 15, 2017
- Ideology: 2012–2015: Bipartisanship; Syncreticism; 2015–2017: Fiscal conservatism Social moderatism
- Political position: Center to center-right
- Seats in the State Senate (at dissolution): 24 / 49

The Majority Coalition Caucus (MCC) was a caucus formed on December 10, 2012, by all 23 Republican members of the Washington State Senate and two Democratic senators. Its membership constituted a majority of the chamber's 49 members, allowing it to take control of the Senate from the Democratic caucus whose members had previously formed a majority. The MCC, operating much like a coalition government, offered an equal number of committee leadership positions to Republicans and Democrats. Senate Democrats accepted only three of the nine positions offered them. The Republicans strengthened their position by gaining one seat in the 2013 election, but lost its majority following a special election in November 2017. The coalition has 23 Republicans and one self-identified Democratic senator, Tim Sheldon. On November 15, 2017, the Majority Coalition Caucus returned to being the state Senate Republican Caucus.

== Formation and organization ==
In the November 2012 elections, Republicans gained one seat in the Washington State Senate, reducing the Democratic majority to 26 out of 49 seats. On December 10, 2012, two Democratic state senators, Tim Sheldon and Rodney Tom, announced they would caucus with the Republicans to create a Republican Majority Caucus with 25 of 49 seats.

The MCC has the power to appoint the chairpersons and members of the twelve policy and three fiscal committees that play a leading role in considering and advancing legislation, much like U.S. Senate committees. The MCC proposed six Republican chairs and six Democratic chairs and co-chairs drawn from both parties for the remaining committees.

Senate Democrats rejected offers to chair or co-chair any committees offered them except three: Steve Hobbs chaired the Financial Institutions & Insurance Committee, Brian Hatfield chaired the Agriculture, Water & Rural Economic Development Committee, and Tracey Eide co-chaired the Transportation Committee with Curtis King. However, by December 2014 Hobbs, Hatfield, and Eide's roles had been reduced to "ranking minority member" on each of their committees in favor of Republican leadership.

The MCC's two Democratic members were given leadership positions: Rodney Tom was Senate Majority Leader, Tim Sheldon (MCC) was the President Pro Tempore of the Senate. Republican Mark Schoesler headed the Senate Republican Caucus, which continued to operate even while all its members belong as well to the MCC.

The election of Republican Jan Angel in 2013 to the Senate gave the MCC 26 of the 49 seats. Rodney Tom characterized this as an "exponential" increase in the coalition's leverage.

In the 2014 election Rodney Tom decided not to seek re-election because of family problems. However, the caucus maintained its majority with 26 senators.

The Majority Coalition Caucus lost its majority in a 2017 special election which saw the election of Democrat Manka Dhingra. On 15 November 2017 the Majority Coalition Caucus was dissolved and all of its members rejoined the Senate Republican Caucus; despite being registered as a Democrat, Tim Sheldon continued to caucus with Republicans.

In the 2018 election, Washington Democratic Party regained its majority in the Senate, electing 28 seats.

== Composition ==
The caucus at peak membership in January 2014. Majority: Republicans (24) Coalition Democrats (2) Non-Coalition Democrats in Majority (3) Minority: Democrats (20)

Affiliation	Party (Shading indicates majority caucus)				Total	
Affiliation	Coalition		Non-coalition		Total	
Affiliation	Republican	Democratic			Total	Vacant
After 2012 Election	23	2	24		49	0
2013 Session	23	2	3	21	49	0
2014 Session	24	2	3	20	49	0
2015–16 Session	25	1	23		49	0
2017 Session	24	1	24		49	0

=== Majority Coalition Caucus-Led Committees ===
Committee	Makeup	Chair	Ranking Member
Accountability & Reform	3 MCC / 2 D	Mark Miloscia	Pramila Jayapal
Agriculture, Water & Rural Economic Development	3 MCC / 2 D	Judith Warnick	Brian Hatfield
Commerce & Labor	4 MCC / 3 D	Michael Baumgartner	Bob Hasegawa
Early Learning & K-12 Education	5 MCC / 4 D	Steve Litzow	Rosemary McAuliffe
Energy, Environment & Telecommunications	5 MCC / 4 D	Doug Ericksen	John McCoy
Financial Institutions & Insurance	5 MCC / 4 D	Don Benton	Mark Mullet
Government Operations & State Security	4 MCC / 3 D	Pam Roach	Marko Liias
Health Care	8 MCC / 5 D	Randi Becker	David Frockt
Higher Education	4 MCC / 3 D	Barbara Bailey	Jeanne Kohl-Welles
Human Services, Mental Health & Housing	3 MCC / 2 D	Steve O'Ban	Jeannie Darneille
Law & Justice	4 MCC / 3 D	Mike Padden	Jamie Pedersen
Natural Resources & Parks	4 MCC / 3 D	Kirk Pearson	Brian Hatfield
Rules	11 MCC / 7 D	Brad Owen	Pam Roach
Trade & Economic Development	4 MCC / 3 D	Sharon Brown	Maralyn Chase
Transportation	9 MCC / 6 D	Curtis King	Steve Hobbs
Ways & Means	13 MCC / 10 D	Andy Hill	James Hargrove

1. Brad Owen served as Lieutenant Governor, which also serves as president of the state Senate and always chairs the Rules committee.

=== List of MCC members ===
District	Senator	Party	Residence	First elected
2	Randi Becker	Republican	Eatonville	2008
4	Mike Padden	Republican	Spokane Valley	2011†
6	Michael Baumgartner	Republican	Spokane	2010
7	Brian Dansel	Republican	Republic	2013†
8	Sharon Brown	Republican	Kennewick	2013*
9	Mark Schoesler	Republican	Ritzville	2004
10	Barbara Bailey	Republican	Oak Harbor	2012
12	Linda Evans Parlette	Republican	Wenatchee	2000
13	Judy Warnick	Republican	Moses Lake	2014
14	Curtis King	Republican	Yakima	2007†
15	Jim Honeyford	Republican	Sunnyside	1998
16	Mike Hewitt	Republican	Walla Walla	2000
17	Don Benton	Republican	Vancouver	1996
18	Ann Rivers	Republican	La Center	2012
20	John Braun	Republican	Centralia	2012
25	Bruce Dammeier	Republican	Puyallup	2012
26	Jan Angel	Republican	Port Orchard	2013†
28	Steve O'Ban	Republican	Tacoma	2013*
30	Mark Miloscia	Republican	Federal Way	2014
31	Pam Roach	Republican	Sumner	1990
35	Tim Sheldon	Democratic (MCC)	Potlatch	1996
39	Kirk Pearson	Republican	Monroe	2012
41	Steve Litzow	Republican	Mercer Island	2010†
42	Doug Ericksen	Republican	Ferndale	2010
45	Andy Hill	Republican	Redmond	2010
47	Joe Fain	Republican	Auburn	2010
48	Rodney Tom	Democratic (MCC)	Bellevue	2010^

* Originally appointed
† Originally Elected in Special Election
^ Until 2015

== Responses ==
Most local media initially responded with cautious optimism to the announced coalition, though a columnist in the Spokesman-Review responded with skepticism. Democratic leaders denounced the MCC as "the exact opposite of collaboration" and denied that it was bi-partisan.

== See also ==
- Washington State Legislature
- Independent Democratic Conference
