= Toni Lysen =

American politician

Member of the Washington House of Representatives from the 34th district
- In office 2002–2003 Serving with Joe McDermott
- Preceded by: Erik Poulsen
- Succeeded by: Eileen Cody

Personal details
- Born: 1946 or 1947 (age 79–80)
- Party: Democratic
- Spouse: King Lysen
- Education: Seattle University

Toni Lysen (born 1946 or 1947) is an American teacher and former politician in the state of Washington. She represented the 34th district in the Washington House of Representatives between 2002 and 2003.

== Early life ==
Lysen was born in 1946 or 1947. She attended Seattle University. She worked as a teacher and a small-claims court facilitator. She was married to King Lysen, a Democratic representative in the Washington state legislature, and the couple had six children. Her husband challenged Henry M. Jackson in the 1982 United States Senate election in Washington as an independent and, as a result, U.S. representative Mike Lowry was pressured not to hire Lysen on his staff. He refused and she served as an aide to him and, later, to U.S. representative Jim McDermott.

== Political career ==
Lysen was appointed by the Metropolitan King County Council on January 7, 2002, to represent the 34th district in the Washington House of Representatives. A Democrat, she held the position until fellow Democrat Eileen Cody was elected in 2003. She introduced House Bill 2763 on January 28, 2002, which would have prevented insurance companies from using an individual's credit score or insurance history in personal insurance decisions. In 2008, she was considered as a candidate to complete the term of representative Joe McDermott in the 34th district but she came second in a ballot of the 34th District Democrats' precinct committee officers, losing to Sharon Nelson.
