= Senator Warnick =

Senator Warnick may refer to:

- Judith Warnick (born 1950), Washington State Senate
- Spencer K. Warnick (1874–1954), New York State Senate

== See also ==
- Frank Warnke (1933–2011), Washington State Senate
- William R. Warnock (1838–1918), Ohio State Senate
