= Matt Manweller =

American political scientist and politician

Member of the Washington House of Representatives from the 13th district
- In office November 29, 2012 – January 14, 2019
- Preceded by: Bill Hinkle
- Succeeded by: Alex Ybarra

Personal details
- Born: Mathew Shon Manweller; August 23, 1969 (age 57) California
- Party: Republican
- Education: Whitman College (BA); University of Montana (MA); University of Oregon (PhD)

Mathew Shon Manweller (born August 23, 1969) is an American politician and political scientist. A member of the Republican Party, he was a member of the Washington House of Representatives, representing the 13th Legislative District, from 2012 to 2019.

== Education ==
Manweller earned a Bachelor of Arts from Whitman College, a Master of Arts from the University of Montana, and PhD from the University of Oregon.

== Career ==
Manweller worked as a Professor of Political Science at Central Washington University.

During his three terms, Matt Manweller was outspoken about controversial topics such as free speech on college campuses, bathroom bills, and the Washington Supreme Court.

=== Central Washington University Sex Investigation ===
He was initially investigated by CWU in 2012, the year he was first elected to the legislature, on claims of sexual harassment by students while teaching. He obtained a restraining order against the university to prevent release of the 2012 report; the order was lifted four days before election day. In both 2012 and 2013, outside investigators concluded that there was "evidence to suggest" that Manweller violated the university's sexual-harassment policies.

While the university did not punish him following the 2012 investigation, in 2013 Manweller's promotion to full professor was delayed and he was ordered to complete sexual harassment training.

On December 11, 2017, Manweller was placed on administrative leave by Central Washington University, following additional complaints from ex-students. CWU investigated Manweller for "inappropriate conduct." The Seattle Times reported on a separate complaint from a legislative aide in Olympia, Washington.

On December 14, 2017, Manweller "resigned his leadership position" as assistant floor leader and was " 'removed' from his position as the Ranking Republican on the House Labor and Workplace Standards Committee."

Manweller filed for re-election in May 2018.

Manweller’s employment as a tenured professor was terminated by Central Washington University on August 14, 2018, after an investigation by an independent third party hired by CWU to evaluate accusations of inappropriate behavior made by former students.

On September 21, 2018, Manweller was asked by party leaders to resign his position in the Washington State House of Representatives after it became widely known that he had had a sexual relationship with a 17-year-old girl, a former high school student of his.

In 2019, Manweller settled a wrongful termination lawsuit with Central Washington University for $155,000.
