= 2017 King County Executive election =

- November 7, 2017
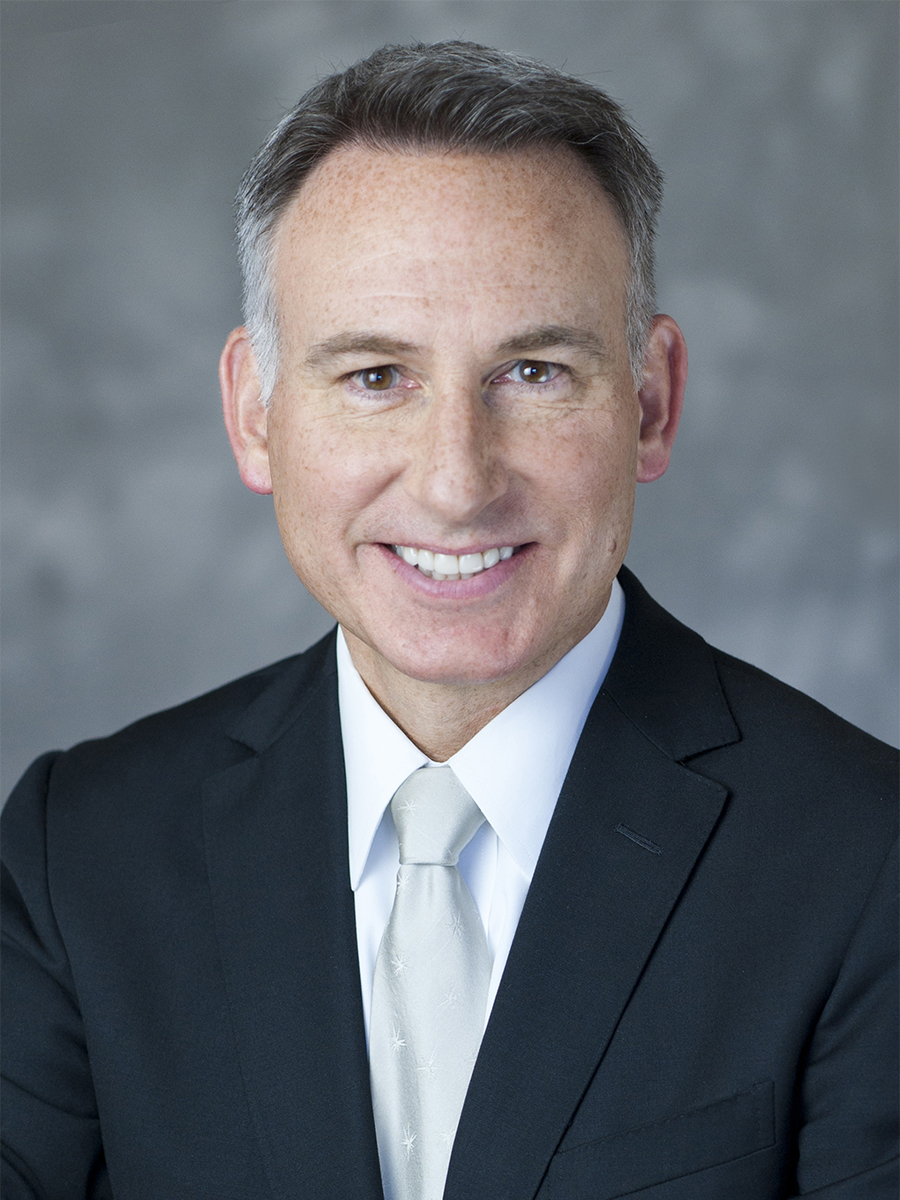

Candidate	Dow Constantine	Bill Hirt
Party	Nonpartisan	Nonpartisan
Popular vote	388,266	114,318
Percentage	76.92%	22.65%
County Executive before election
Dow Constantine
Nonpartisan
Elected County Executive
Dow Constantine
Nonpartisan

The 2017 King County Executive election took place on November 7, 2017, following a primary on August 1, 2017. Incumbent County Executive Dow Constantine ran for re-election to a third term. He faced little-known challengers, and placed first in the primary by a wide margin, winning 77 percent of the vote. Retired engineer Bill Hirt placed second with 13 percent and advanced to the general election. Constantine defeated Hirt by a wide margin, winning his third term with 77 percent of the vote.

== Primary election ==
=== Candidates ===
- Dow Constantine, incumbent County Executive
- Bill Hirt, retired engineer, anti-Sound Transit activist
- Goodspaceguy, perennial candidate
- Stan Lippman, perennial candidate

=== Results ===
2017 King County Executive primary election
Party	Candidate	Votes	%
Nonpartisan	Dow Constantine (inc.)	304,456	76.99%
Nonpartisan	Bill Hirt	49,687	12.57%
Nonpartisan	Goodspaceguy	23,427	5.92%
Nonpartisan	Stan Lippmann	14,644	3.70%
Write-in		3,218	0.81%
Total votes		395,432	100.00%

== General election ==
=== Results ===
2017 King County Executive election
Party	Candidate	Votes	%
Nonpartisan	Dow Constantine (inc.)	388,266	76.92%
Nonpartisan	Bill Hirt	114,318	22.65%
Write-in		2,197	0.44%
Total votes		504,781	100.00%
