= Senator Newbry =

Senator Newbry may refer to:

- Earl T. Newbry (1900–1995), Oregon State Senate
- Janéa Holmquist Newbry (born 1974), Washington State Senate
- L. W. Newbry (1923–2012), Oregon State Senate
