= Senator Swanson (disambiguation) =

Claude A. Swanson (1862–1939) was a U.S. Senator from Virginia from 1910 to 1933. Senator Swanson may also refer to:

- Arthur Swanson (1926–2010), Illinois State Senate
- Hilding Alfred Swanson (1885–1964), Minnesota State Senate
- Lena Swanson (born 1937), Washington State Senate
- William Swanson (Nebraska politician) (1922–2007), Nebraska State Senate
