= Frank Hansen =

Franklin or Frank Hansen may refer to:

- Frank Hansen (Australian footballer) (1884–1975), Australian rules full-forward
- Franklin Hansen (1897–1982), American Oscar-winning film sound engineer
- Frank Hansen (politician) (1913–1991), American legislator in Washington state
- Frank Hansen (rower) (born 1945), Norwegian Olympic medalist
- Frank Hansen (bobsleigh) (born 1952), American 1984 Olympian
- Frank Hansen (footballer, born 1983), Danish defender

== See also ==
- Francis Hanson (1807–1873), American Episcopal missionary to China
- Frank H. Hanson (1884–1940), American politician in Wisconsin
- Frank Hanson (born 1965), Ghanaian Chief of Naval Staff
