= Senator Roach (disambiguation) =

William N. Roach (1840–1902) was a U.S. Senator from North Dakota from 1893 to 1899. Senator Roach may refer to:

- Pam Roach (born 1948), Washington State Senator
- Tregenza Roach (born 1959), Senate of the U.S. Virgin Islands
