= Olema =

Olema may refer to:

- Olema, California, an unincorporated community in the United States
- Olema, Washington, an unincorporated community in the United States
- Olema, Russia, a rural locality (a selo) in Leshukonsky District of Arkhangelsk Oblast, Russia
- Olema Station, California, a former name of Point Reyes Station, California
- Olema Valley
