= Wanda Hansen =

American politician (1921–2009)

Member of the Washington Senate from the 13th district
- In office January 27, 1992 – November 3, 1992
- Preceded by: Frank Hansen
- Succeeded by: Harold Hochstatter

Personal details
- Born: 1921 Idaho, U.S.
- Died: June 12, 2009 (aged 87) Moses Lake, Washington, U.S.
- Party: Democratic
- Spouse: Frank Hansen
- Children: 4

Wanda Hansen (1921–2009) was an American politician who served in the Washington State Senate for the 13th district. She was appointed to the seat on January 27, 1992, after her husband, Frank Hansen, died in 1991, and served until the next election in November 1992.
