= Jan Drago =

American politician from Seattle

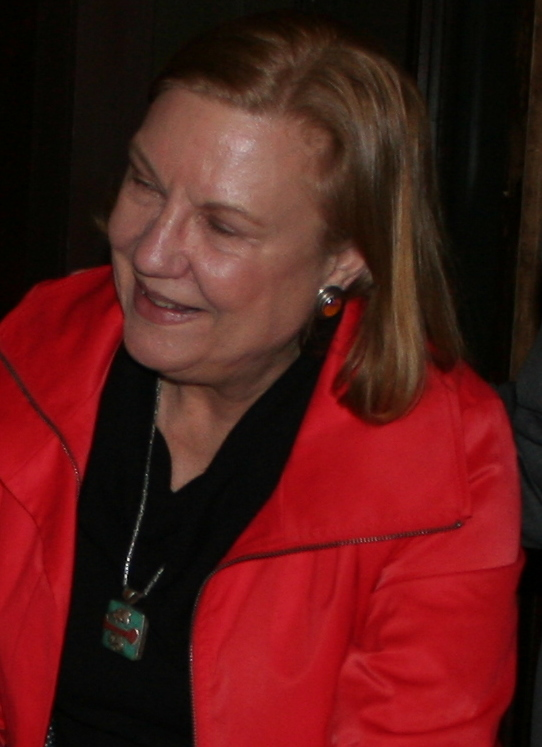
- Jan Drago, 2010

Member of the King County Council from the 8th district
- In office January 4, 2010 – November 24, 2010
- Preceded by: Dow Constantine
- Succeeded by: Joe McDermott

Member of Seattle City Council for the 4th Position
- In office January 1, 1994 – December 31, 2009
- Preceded by: George Benson
- Succeeded by: Sally Bagshaw

President of the Seattle City Council
- In office January 3, 2004 – January 3, 2006
- Preceded by: Peter Steinbrueck
- Succeeded by: Nick Licata
- In office January 3, 1996 – January 3, 1998
- Preceded by: Jim Street
- Succeeded by: Sue Donaldson

Personal details
- Born: May 12, 1940 (age 86)
- Party: Democratic
- Spouse: Noel Drago
- Children: 4
- Education: Rutgers University (BA)
- Occupation: Politician; teacher

Jan Drago (born May 12, 1940) is an American politician and educator from Seattle who served on the Seattle City Council and King County Council.

== Early life and education ==
Drago was born May 12, 1940, in Lansing, Michigan. At 17, she owned a Tastee-Freez franchise where she met her husband, Noel. In 1959, the couple married and moved to New York, then New Jersey a year later. While in New Jersey, she graduated Douglass College, Rutgers University with a degree in psychology. After college, Drago taught preschool and kindergarten in a Head Start program, and managed Democratic political campaigns. In 1978, Drago and her family relocated to Ohio for Noel's new job, but stayed a year before moving to Seattle.

After moving to Seattle, Drago opened a Häagen-Dazs Ice Cream Shoppes franchise throughout Seattle, including the Capitol Hill neighborhood and Pike Place Market. She became an advocate for downtown businesses, due to the increased homeless population in the area, and was active in the Downtown Seattle Association, First Avenue Association, and the Denny Regrade Crime Prevention Council.

== Seattle City Council ==
From 1994 to 2009, Drago was a member of Seattle City Council.

During that time, she was Council President (1996-1997 and 2004–2005), chair of the Finance and Budget Committee (1999–2003) and chair of the Transportation Committee. She also served on the Housing and Economic Development Committee, and the Parks and Seattle Center Committee. She represented the council on the Puget Sound Regional Council and its Transportation Policy Board as well as King County's Regional Transportation Committee, the Trade Development Alliance, the Seattle Convention and Visitors’ Board, PortJobs Board, Seattle-Chongqing Sister Association, Seattle-Taejon Sister City Council, the Sister Cities Coordinating Council, and the Sister City Association. For eight years, she was a Council representative on the Civic Center Client Group.

On March 1, 2009, Drago announced her intention to retire from the Seattle City Council and not seek another term.

Drago's lasting impact, as a Seattle elected official, was on transportation. As a councilmember, Drago played a leading role in the success of a mega-project, the deep-bore tunnel under downtown that replaced the Alaskan Way Viaduct; in the transformation of a major arterial—the two-way Mercer Street—that helped develop the South Lake Union neighborhood now home to Amazon headquarters; and the beginning of the Seattle Streetcar network.

On May 26, 2009, Drago declared that she was running for Mayor of Seattle, seeking to unseat two-term Mayor Greg Nickels. She ultimately finished fifth in the August 2009 primary election and failed to advance to the November general election.

== King County Council ==
On January 4, 2010, only four days after she had left the Seattle City Council, Drago was appointed to the King County Council, District 8. She filled the seat left vacant by Dow Constantine's election as King County Executive. As a condition of her appointment, she agreed not to seek the post in the November 2010 election.

== Personal life ==
Drago and her husband, Noel, are residents of Seattle's Pioneer Square, a downtown historic district, and have four sons, four grandsons, and a great-grandson.
