= Larry Phillips (Washington politician) =

American politician from Washington

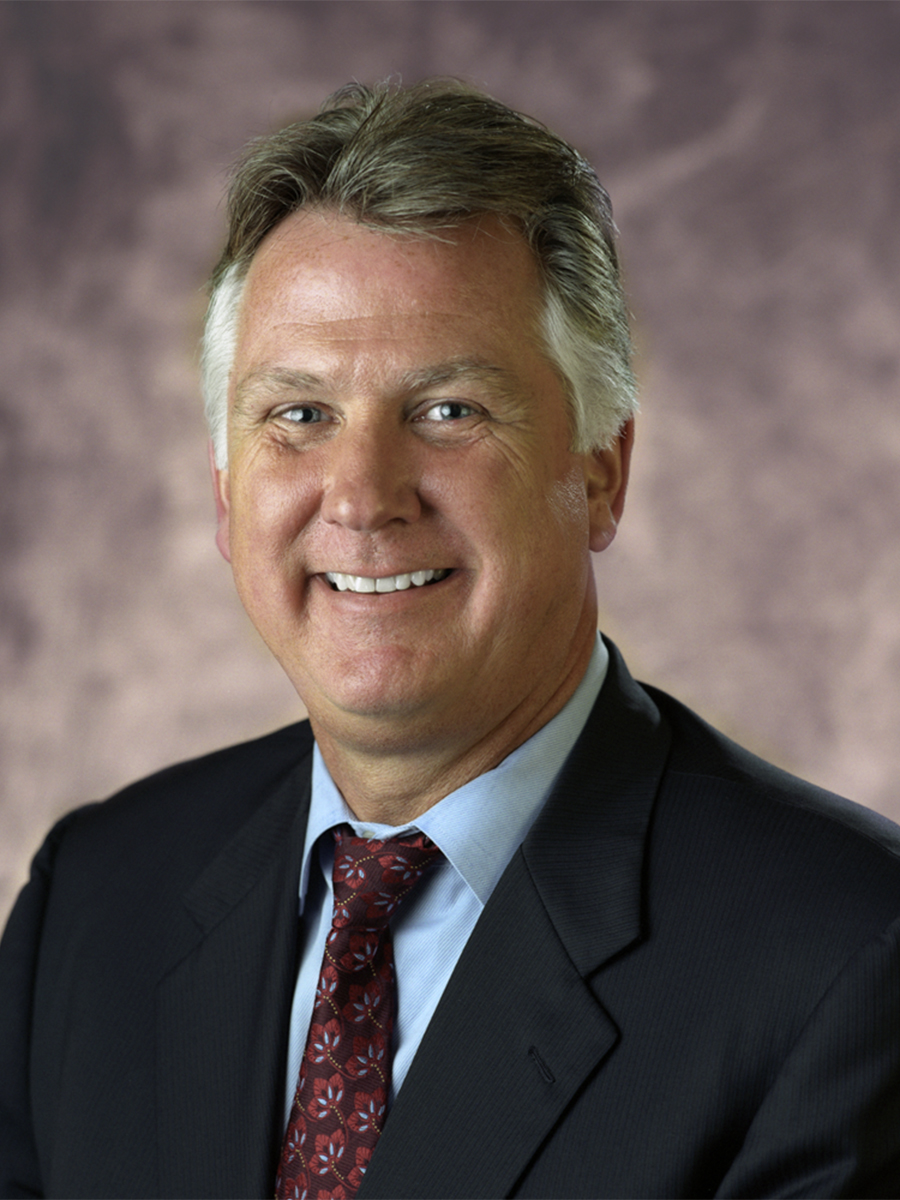

Chair of the King County Council
- In office January 1, 2014 – January 1, 2016
- Preceded by: Larry Gossett
- Succeeded by: Joe McDermott
- In office January 1, 2004 – January 1, 2007
- Preceded by: Cynthia Sullivan
- Succeeded by: Larry Gossett

Member of the King County Council from the 4th district
- In office January 1, 1992 – January 1, 2016
- Preceded by: Lois North
- Succeeded by: Jeanne Kohl-Welles

Member of the Washington House of Representatives from the 36th district
- In office January 9, 1989 – January 14, 1991
- Preceded by: Seth Armstrong
- Succeeded by: Jeanne Kohl-Welles

Personal details
- Born: March 15, 1951 (age 75) King County, Washington, U.S.
- Party: Democratic
- Spouse: Gail Phillips
- Education: University of Washington, Willamette University
- Occupation: Politician

Lawrence R. Phillips (born March 15, 1951) is an American politician who served as a member of the King County Council in State of Washington. Phillips served on the council from 1992 to 2016, representing the fourth district, which includes the Seattle neighborhoods of Queen Anne, Magnolia, Ballard, Fremont, Belltown, South Lake Union, and Downtown. He served as chair of the council from 2004 to 2006 and again in 2014. He was unopposed in his 2011 re-election. Phillips also serves on the Board of Directors of Sound Transit, a regional transit organization serving the Puget Sound area. A hallmark of Phillips's tenure has been his work to preserve forests and farmland by buying land, development rights, or conservation easements. Phillips is a self-identified Democrat, although his position on the King County Council was officially nonpartisan. On April 1, 2015, Phillips announced he would not seek reelection to the King County Council that November.

== Early life ==
Larry Phillips was born in 1951 in King County to Margery and John Phillips. His father was an architect and United States Naval Officer, serving in the Pacific in WWII, and his mother wrote for the Seattle Times, creating their "Home of the Month" feature called "Northwest Living." Phillips grew up in Mount Baker and Magnolia with his two sisters and graduated from Queen Anne High School.

== Education ==
Phillips earned a bachelor's degree from the University of Washington. He earned a Juris Doctor degree from Willamette University College of Law, graduating with honors and finishing in the top ten percent of his class. He also earned a Masters of Law degree with emphasis in Labor Law from the George Washington University National Law Center.

== Early career ==
After graduating from law school, Phillips entered public service, moving to Washington, D.C. to work for Senator Henry M. "Scoop"Jackson. His primary staffing responsibilities were labor and tax issues. Phillips returned to Seattle to run Randy Revelle's campaign for King County Executive. Revelle won the election, and Phillips served as his chief of staff. After Revelle left office, Phillips served as executive director of a 55-member Seattle law firm, Shidler McBroom Gates & Lucas. In 1988 he won election to the Washington State House of Representatives. He went to Olympia to represent the 36th Legislative District, where he was a member of the House Education, Local Government, Environmental Affairs, and Revenue Committees. He was an author and a prime sponsor of the 1990 Growth Management Act, as well as legislation to prevent oil spills in Puget Sound. He also fought successfully for smaller class sizes in public schools and adequate funding for K-12 education.

== King County Council ==
After serving two terms in the legislature, Phillips won his seat on the Metropolitan King County Council to represent District Four. On the council, Phillips has been a leader on such issues as, land use and water quality, salmon protection, parks and open space, fiscal management, transportation and clean energy, and jobs and the economy. In 2004, during his tenure as Council Chair, Phillips drew attention when he discovered that his absentee ballot had not been counted, along with 572 others, in the 2004 Washington gubernatorial election, which was decided by a margin of only 129 votes. As a result of his noticing the mistake, the ballots were counted, ultimately swinging the race in favor of Democratic candidate Christine Gregoire.

As a founding member of Water Resource Inventory Area (WRIA) 8, Phillips helped coordinate a local response to the federal listing of Chinook salmon as endangered. Phillips has played a role in preserving over 165,000 acres of farm and forest land and salmon habitat as open space in King County during his time on the council.

As the council's Budget Chair for three years during King County's budget crisis, Phillips presided over $170 million in cuts to stabilize the budget while protecting King County's AAA bond rating and prioritizing public safety, public health, and the human services safety net.

Phillips was named the 2001 Public Official of the Year by the Municipal League of Seattle for his leadership in protecting and enhancing our quality of life through his work on land preservation and growth management in King County, and the 2010 Public Official of the Year by the 43rd District Democrats.

In recent years, Phillips has turned his attention to transportation, clean energy, and jobs. As a Sound Transit Boardmember, he served as Chair of the Central Link Oversight Committee overseeing the on time, under budget construction of Link light rail from Downtown Seattle to Tukwila. Phillips also led successful efforts to pass a regional mass transit expansion package that includes building 36 additional miles of light rail throughout the region. In response to Metro Transit's budget shortfall, Phillips called for a performance audit that identified over $200 million of savings or additional revenues that could be used to preserve service. He also called for the successful creation of the Regional Transit Task Force which made recommendations for improving Metro's future.

At the end of the 2013 Council session, Phillips was unanimously elected as Council Chair for 2014, taking over that duty from Councilmember Larry Gossett.
