= Fred Finn (politician) =

American politician

Member of the Washington House of Representatives from the 35th district
- In office January 12, 2009 – January 14, 2013
- Preceded by: William Eickmeyer
- Succeeded by: Drew MacEwen

Personal details
- Born: August 24, 1945 (age 81) New York City, New York, U.S.
- Party: Democratic
- Spouse: Bonnie Finn
- Children: 3
- Education: Johns Hopkins University (BA); Fordham University School of Law (JD)

Military service
- Allegiance: United States
- Branch/service: United States Army
- Years of service: 1968–1971

Frederick W. Finn (born August 24, 1945) is an American attorney, businessman, and politician of the Democratic Party. He was a member of the Washington House of Representatives, representing the 35th district from 2009 to 2013.
