= Georgette Valle =

American politician from Washington (1924–2024)

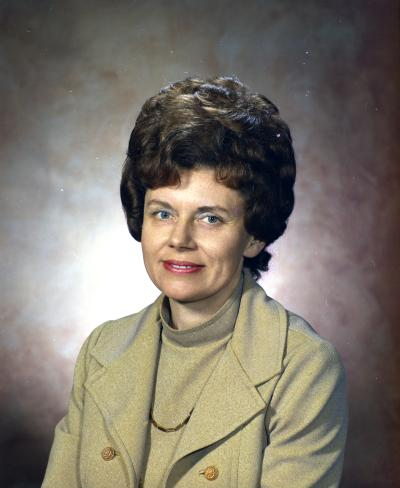
- Valle in 1973

Member of the Washington House of Representatives from the 31st district district
- In office 1965–1976

Member of the Washington House of Representatives from the 31st district district
- In office 1973–1983

Member of the Washington House of Representatives from the 34th district district
- In office 1987–1997
- Succeeded by: Dow Constantine

Personal details
- Born: October 31, 1924 Blue Earth, Minnesota, U.S.
- Died: July 10, 2024 (aged 99)
- Party: Democratic
- Education: University of Minnesota
- Occupation: Occupational therapist

Georgette W. Valle (née Vikingstad; October 31, 1924 – July 10, 2024) was an American politician in the state of Washington. Valle served in the Washington House of Representatives as a Democrat from the 31st District, as well as the 34th District.

== Biography ==
Valle worked on local campaigns and served as legislative chairwoman for the Highline chapter of the National Organization of Women. She later became legislative chairwoman of the Democratic Party's 1969 task force, and acted as a catalyst for bringing environmentalists in touch with the Democratic Caucus. She was an alumna of the University of Minnesota graduating with a degree in occupational therapy and worked as an occupational therapist. She was married to Odd Valle, originally from Norway, who was a dentist. Valle died in her sleep at home on July 10, 2024, at the age of 99. Washington State Governor Jay Inslee directed flags at all state agency facilities to be lowered to half-staff on July 30, 2024 in her honor.
