= Tom Dent =

American politician (born 1950)

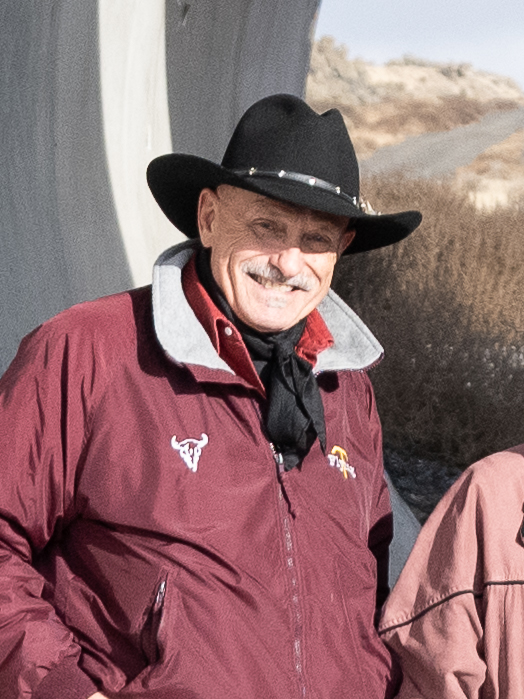

Member of the Washington House of Representatives from the 13th district
- Incumbent
- Assumed office January 12, 2015 Serving with Alex Ybarra
- Preceded by: Judith Warnick

Personal details
- Born: Thomas Emmett Dent; January 11, 1950 (age 76) Nampa, Idaho, U.S.
- Party: Republican
- Children: 3
- Education: Big Bend Community College
- Website: Official

Thomas Emmett Dent (born January 11, 1950) is an American politician who serves as a member of the Washington House of Representatives representing the 13th Legislative District. He was elected in 2014 to the House seat vacated by Judy Warnick, who retired to run for the Washington State Senate. He is a former chairman of the Grant County Republican Party.

Dent has been a pilot since 1975, founding Tom Dent Aviation in Othello in 1977. The company moved to Moses Lake in 1984. He was appointed as a commissioner for Moses Lake Municipal Airport in 1994. He is also a cattle and bison rancher.

== Awards ==
- 2020 Guardians of Small Business. Presented by NFIB.

== Electoral history ==
=== 2014 ===
Washington House of Representatives, District 13-Position 1, 2014 General Election
Party	Candidate	Votes	%
Republican	Tom Dent	20,876	63.3%
Republican	Dannette Bolyard	12,123	36.7%
Total votes		32,999	100%

=== 2016 ===
Incumbent Tom Dent ran unopposed in the Washington House of Representatives, District 13-Position 1 general election.

=== 2018 ===
Washington House of Representatives, District 13-Position 1, 2018 General Election
Party	Candidate	Votes	%
Republican	Tom Dent (incumbent)	35,233	71.4%
Democratic	Jesse Hegstrom Oakey	14,130	28.6%
Total votes		49,363	100%

=== 2020 ===
Washington House of Representatives, District 13-Position 1, 2020 General Election
Party	Candidate	Votes	%
Republican	Tom Dent (incumbent)	47,701	71.3%
Democratic	Eduardo Castañeda-Díaz	19,104	28.6%
Total votes		66,873	100%

=== 2022 ===
Washington House of Representatives, District 13-Position 1, 2022 General Election
Party	Candidate	Votes	%
Republican	Tom Dent (incumbent)	41,617	97.1%
Nonpartisan	Other/Write-in	1,235	2.9%
Total votes		42,852	100%

=== 2024 ===
Washington House of Representatives, District 13-Position 1, 2024 General Election
Party	Candidate	Votes	%
Republican	Tom Dent (incumbent)	51,493	97.3%
Nonpartisan	Other/Write-in	1,406	2.7%
Total votes		52,899	100%

== Personal life ==
Dent has lived in Moses Lake, Washington for more than 30 years.
