= 1982 United States Senate election in Washington =

- November 2, 1982
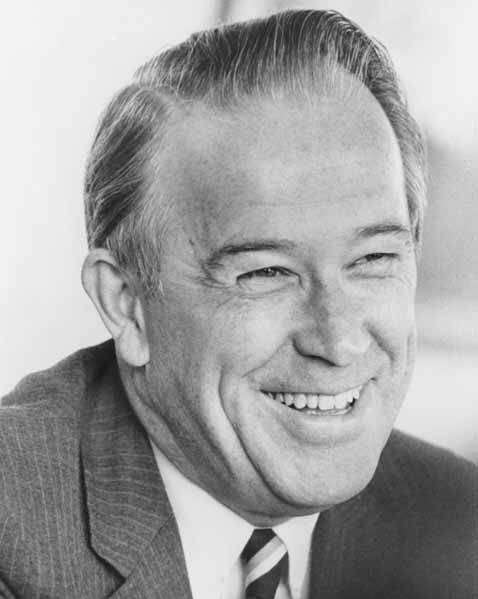

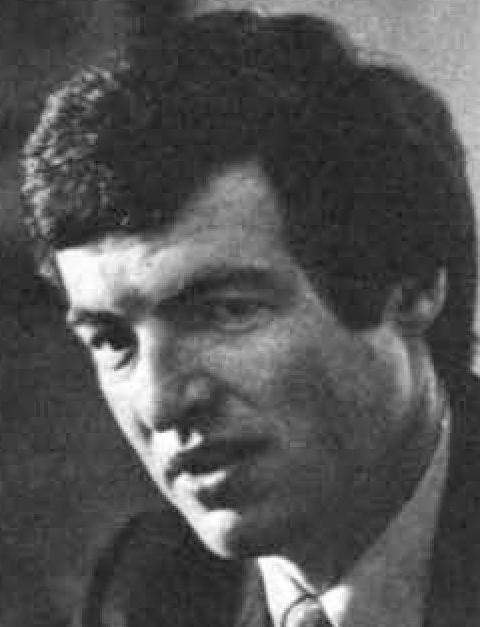

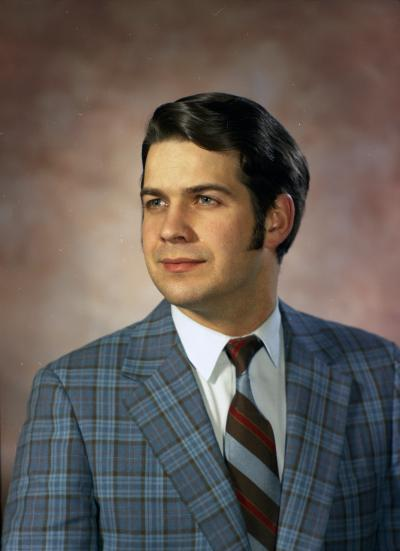
Nominee	Henry M. Jackson	Douglas Jewett	King Lysen
Party	Democratic	Republican	Independent
Popular vote	943,665	332,273	72,297
Percentage	68.96%	24.28%	5.28%
- County results Jackson: 40–50% 60–70% 70–80%
U.S. senator before election
Henry M. Jackson
Democratic
Elected U.S. Senator
Henry M. Jackson
Democratic

The 1982 United States Senate election in Washington was held on November 2, 1982. Incumbent Democrat Henry M. Jackson defeated Republican nominee Douglas Jewett with 68.96% of the vote.

== Primary election ==
Primary elections were held on September 14, 1982.

=== Candidates ===
- Henry M. Jackson, incumbent United States Senator
- Douglas Jewett, Seattle City Attorney
- King Lysen, State Senator
- Jesse Chiang
- Larry Penberthy
- Ken Talbott
- Patrick Sean McGowan
- C.E. Stites
- James Sherwood Stokes
- William H. Davis
- John Patric, writer
- Arthur Bauder
- Clarice Privette
- Chris Remple

=== Results ===
1982 United States Senate primary election in Washington
Party	Candidate	Votes	%
Democratic	Henry M. Jackson (incumbent)	450,580	66.23%
Republican	Douglas Jewett	73,616	10.82%
Independent	King Lysen	31,186	4.58%
Independent	Jesse Chiang	12,514	1.84%
Republican	Larry Penberthy	46,037	6.77%
Republican	Ken Talbott	15,581	2.29%
Republican	Patrick Sean McGowan	13,054	1.92%
Republican	C.E. Stites	7,542	1.11%
Democratic	James Sherwood Stokes	7,101	1.04%
Democratic	William H. Davis	6,764	0.99%
Democratic	John Patric	5,408	0.80%
Democratic	Arthur Bauder	4,762	0.70%
Republican	Clarice Privette	3,221	0.47%
Socialist Workers	Chris Remple	3,006	0.44%
Total votes		680,372	100.00%

== General election ==
=== Candidates ===
Major party candidates

- Henry M. Jackson, Democratic
- Douglas Jewett, Republican

Other candidates

- King Lysen, Independent
- Jesse Chiang, Independent

=== Results ===
1982 United States Senate election in Washington
Party	Candidate	Votes	%	±%
Democratic	Henry M. Jackson (incumbent)	943,665	68.96%	
Republican	Douglas Jewett	332,273	24.28%	
Independent	King Lysen	72,297	5.28%	
Independent	Jesse Chiang	20,251	1.48%	
Majority		611,392	44.68%	
Turnout		1,368,486		
Democratic hold		Swing		

== See also ==
- 1982 United States Senate elections
