= Kirby Wilbur =

Chair of the Washington Republican Party
- In office January 24, 2011 – July 29, 2013
- Preceded by: Luke Esser
- Succeeded by: Luanne Van Werven (acting)

Personal details
- Born: Kirby Allen Wilbur; November 11, 1953 (age 72) Washington, D.C., U.S.
- Spouse: Trina
- Children: 2

Kirby Wilbur
- Presenting career
- Show: Kirby & Carlson, The Kirby Wilbur Show; Sean Hannity Show (occasional)
- Stations: KVI-AM; Sinclair Broadcast Group
- Time slot: 8:00am–10:00am PST; 10:00am–12:00pm PST
- Style: Topical Talk Show; Topical Talk Show
- Country: United States

Kirby Allen Wilbur (born November 11, 1953) is an American talk radio journalist that lives in Texas and is a conservative political activist. He served as the chair of the Washington State Republican Party.

== Early life and career ==
Wilbur was born in Washington, D.C., on November 11, 1953 and raised in Seattle, graduating from Queen Anne High School and the University of Washington. A real estate appraiser by profession, Wilbur was a frequent caller to Seattle talk radio stations when, in 1993, a producer at KVI-AM asked him to audition for an on-air position. He was first employed by the station as a substitute host, then began weekday evening broadcasts in 1993.

Wilbur, who has served as a delegate to three Republican National Conventions, met his wife, Trina, while working on Ronald Reagan's 1980 presidential campaign. They have two sons, Nathan and Adam.

== Current work ==
=== Activism ===
Wilbur is a member of the boards of directors of the Young America's Foundation, the American Conservative Union, Second Amendment Foundation, and Citizens United.

=== Writing ===
In 1999 Wilbur co-authored, with Floyd Brown, Say the Right Thing: Talk Radio's Favorite Conservative Quotes, Notes and Gloats, which was published by Merrill Press.

=== Radio ===
Wilbur began hosting the 5:00am to 9:00am (PT) time slot at KVI-AM in 1995 as The Kirby Wilbur Show. In 2006, the name of the program was changed to Kirby & Co. and began to feature occasional, but increasingly irregular, contributions by KVI news director Carleen Johnson and producer David Carson.

Frequent guests included "Brian the Movie Guy", a local movie reviewer who provides family-friendly film reviews. Famous guests included Donald Rumsfeld, Laura Schlessinger, and Dennis Miller.

On November 12, 2009, Wilbur broadcast the last edition of his show. The KVI general manager indicated that the reason was declining ratings; no misconduct was cited.

Wilbur returned to KVI on January 4, 2016 in the 9 a.m. to noon slot, including co-hosting the first hour with morning drive host John Carlson. This has since been increased to the first two hours (8 a.m. - 10 with Carlson, 10 a.m. - noon solo).

Wilbur has been a frequent staple on the Talkers Magazine "Heavy Hundred" list, an annual index of what the magazine bills as "the most important radio talk show hosts in America". In 2009, he appeared in position 72.

=== The Sean Hannity Show ===
Since 2003 Wilbur has served as fill-in host on 11 episodes of the Sean Hannity Show.

=== Chair of the Washington State Republican Party ===
Wilbur unseated Luke Esser by a vote of 69 to 36 as Chair of the Washington State Republican Party in January 2011.
