= Bill Hinkle =

American Paramedic, firefighter and politician from Washington

County Commissioner of Kittitas County, Washington
- In office 1996–2002

Member of the Washington House of Representatives from the 13th, Position 2 district
- In office 2002 – November 2012
- Succeeded by: Matt Manweller

Personal details
- Born: August 18, 1956 (age 69) Tacoma, Washington
- Party: Republican
- Spouse: Debra Hinkle
- Children: 3
- Occupation: Paramedic, firefighter, politician

William R. Hinkle (born August 18, 1956) is an American politician in Washington. Hinkle is a former Republican Party member of the Washington House of Representatives, representing the 13th district.

== Early life ==
On August 18, 1956, Hinkle was born in Tacoma, Washington.

== Education ==
Hinkle attended South Puget Sound Community College and Tacoma Community College. Hinkle studied advanced prehospital medicine at the University of Washington. Hinkle earned a Master of Arts in Applied Theology from the University of Balamand in Lebanon.

== Career ==
Hinkle is a former paramedic and firefighter. In 1996, Hinkle served as a County Commissioner for Kittitas County, Washington, until 2002.

In 2002, Hinkle won the election and became a Republican Party member of Washington State House of Representatives for District 13. In November 2012, Hinkle resigned.

Hinkle is a life time member of National Rifle Association of America.

In 2012, Hinkle became an executive director of the Rental Housing Association of Puget Sound.

== Personal life ==
Hinkle's wife is Debra Hinkle, a firefighter and dispatcher. They have two children. Hinkle and his family live in Cle Elum, Washington.
