= Alex Ybarra =

American politician (born 1961)

Member of the Washington House of Representatives from the 13th district
- Incumbent
- Assumed office January 14, 2019 Serving with Tom Dent
- Preceded by: Matt Manweller

Personal details
- Born: 1961 (age 64–65) Quincy, Washington, U.S.
- Party: Republican
- Children: 1
- Education: Central Washington University (BS); University of Phoenix (MBA)
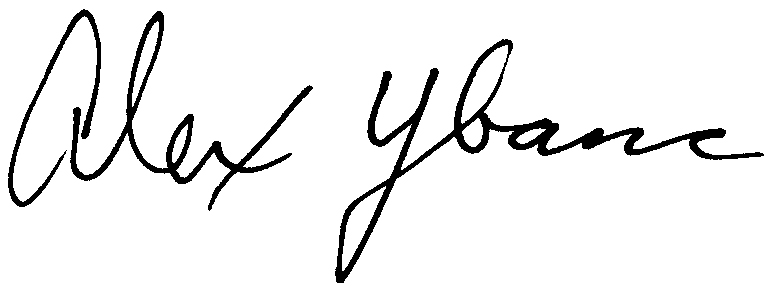
- Signature

Alejandro "Alex" Ybarra (born 1961) is an American politician serving as a member of the Washington House of Representatives from the 13th district, which includes Lincoln and Kittitas counties and parts of Grant County and Yakima County.

== Early life and education ==
Ybarra was born and raised in Quincy, Washington. He earned a Bachelor of Science in mathematics from Central Washington University and a Master of Business Administration from the University of Phoenix.

== Career ==
Ybarra worked as an engineer at Rocket Research Company, specializing in the development of military and aerospace products. Ybarra has worked as the reliability and compliance auditor for the Grant County Public Utility District since 2003. Ybarra was selected to serve in the Washington House of Representatives on January 14, 2019, succeeding Matt Manweller, who resigned from the House amid revelations that Manweller had engaged in a sexual relationship with an underage student.

== Awards ==
- 2020 Guardians of Small Business. Presented by NFIB.
