= Joyce Mulliken =

American politician (1945–2021)

Member of the Washington Senate from the 13th district
- In office January 13, 2003 – November 14, 2006
- Preceded by: Harold Hochstatter
- Succeeded by: Janéa Holmquist Newbry

Member of the Washington House of Representatives from the 13th district
- In office January 9, 1995 – January 13, 2003
- Preceded by: Mick Hansen
- Succeeded by: Bill Hinkle

Personal details
- Born: Joyce Curtis Mulliken; August 29, 1945 Rumford, Maine
- Died: June 26, 2021 (aged 75)
- Party: Republican

Joyce Curtis Mulliken (August 29, 1945 – June 26, 2021) was an American politician who served in the Washington House of Representatives from the 13th district from 1995 to 2003 and in the Washington State Senate from the 13th district from 2003 to 2006.
