= Diane Tebelius =

Chair of the Washington Republican Party
- In office January 28, 2006 – January 27, 2007
- Preceded by: Chris Vance
- Succeeded by: Luke Esser

Personal details
- Born: 1948 (age 77–78) North Dakota, U.S.
- Education: Walla Walla University (BA); Georgetown University (LLM); Whittier College (JD)

Diane E. Tebelius (born 1948) is an American attorney and former federal prosecutor, Tebelius was the chair of the Washington State Republican Party from 2006 to 2007. In 2004, she ran in the Republican primary for election to Washington's 8th congressional district. In a field of four, she finished second behind popular King County Sheriff Dave Reichert who went on to win the general election.

== Personal life and education ==
Tebelius was born in 1948 in North Dakota where she was raised on a wheat farm. She received a bachelor's degree in history from Walla Walla College. After teaching math in public schools, Tebelius earned a J.D. degree from Whittier College School of Law and a Master's degree in taxation from Georgetown University. In 1985, she married attorney Robert McCallum. They live in Bellevue, Washington.

== Career ==
In 1981, Tebelius was hired as a special counsel to the United States Senate Committee on the Budget to work on President Ronald Reagan's first budget and tax proposal. In 1986, she became an assistant United States Attorney in Seattle, Washington. Tebelius retired as a prosecutor in 2006.
