= William Eickmeyer =

American politician

Member of the Washington House of Representatives from the 35th district
- In office December 22, 1997 – January 12, 2009
- Preceded by: Tim Sheldon
- Succeeded by: Fred Finn

Personal details
- Born: March 18, 1939 (age 87) Spokane, Washington, U.S.
- Party: Democratic
- Children: 4
- Education: Western Washington University (BA)

William "Ike" Eickmeyer (born March 18, 1939) is an American politician, who was a member of the Washington House of Representatives, representing the 35th district from 1997 to 2009. He is a member of the Democratic Party.
