= Harold Hochstatter =

American politician

Member of the Washington Senate from the 13th district
- In office November 1992 – January 13, 2003
- Preceded by: Wanda Hansen
- Succeeded by: Joyce Mulliken

Member of the Washington House of Representatives from the 13th district
- In office January 14, 1991 – November 1992
- Preceded by: Curtis Prout Smith
- Succeeded by: Mick Hansen

Personal details
- Born: October 1, 1937 (age 88) Moses Lake, Washington
- Party: Republican

Harold Hochstatter (born October 26, 1937) is an American politician who served in the Washington House of Representatives from the 13th district from 1991 to 1992 and in the Washington State Senate from the 13th district from 1992 to 2003.
