= Frank Hansen (politician) =

American politician

Frank (Tub) Hansen
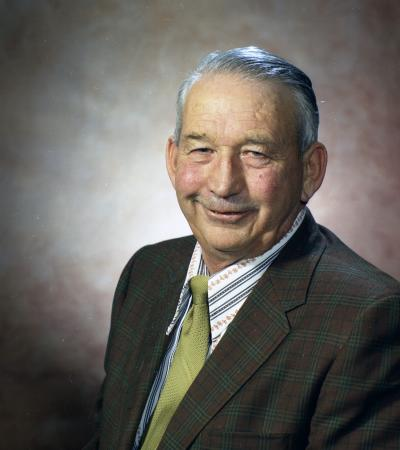
- Frank Hansen in 1973

Member of the Washington House of Representatives from the 13th district
- In office 1973–1979

Member of the Washington State Senate for the 13th district
- In office 1979–1991
- Succeeded by: Wanda Hansen

Personal details
- Born: December 27, 1913 Olema, Washington, United States
- Died: December 29, 1991 (aged 78) Seattle, Washington, United States
- Party: Democratic
- Spouse: Wanda Hansen
- Children: 4

Frank Delmar (Tub) Hansen (December 27, 1913 – December 29, 1991) was an American politician in the state of Washington. He served in the Washington House of Representatives from 1973 to 1979 for district 13, and in the Senate from 1979 to his death in 1991.
