= Olema, Washington =

Unincorporated community in Washington, United States

Olema
- Unincorporated community
- Interactive map of Olema
- Coordinates: 48°17′09″N 119°48′15″W
- Country: United States
- State: Washington
- County: Okanogan
- Elevation: 2,044 ft (623 m)
- GNIS feature ID: 1524024

Olema is an unincorporated community in the U.S. state of Washington.

A post office called Olema was established in 1896, and remained in operation until 1924.

== Notable people ==
- Frank Hansen (1913-1991) - politician
