= Georgia Gardner =

American politician

Member of the Washington House of Representatives from the 42nd district
- In office 1997–1999

Member of the Washington Senate from the 42nd district
- In office 1999–2003

Personal details
- Born: 1944 (age 81–82) Washington
- Party: Democratic
- Education: Central Washington University
- Alma mater: Golden Gate University

Georgia Anne Gardner (born 1944) is an American politician. She was a Democrat, and represented District 42 in the Washington House of Representatives and the Washington Senate, which included parts of Whatcom County, from 1997 to 2003.
