= King Lysen =

American educator and politician

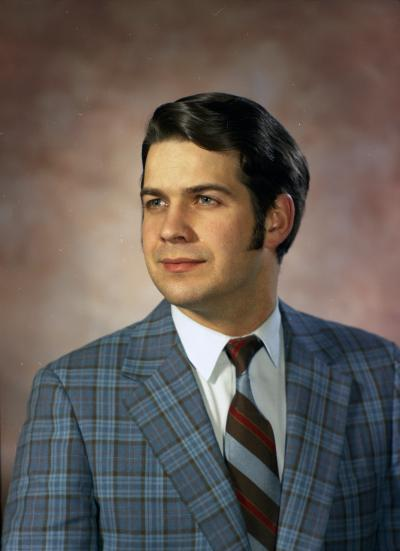
- Lysen in 1971

Member of the Washington Senate from the 31st district
- In office January 8, 1979 – January 10, 1983
- Preceded by: Gordon Herr
- Succeeded by: Frank Warnke

Member of the Washington House of Representatives from the 31st district
- In office January 11, 1971 – January 8, 1979
- Preceded by: Norman B. Ackley
- Succeeded by: John Jovanovich

Personal details
- Born: March 10, 1942 Minneapolis, Minnesota, U.S.
- Died: March 15, 2017 (aged 75) Burien, Washington, U.S.
- Party: Democratic
- Occupation: Teacher

King Lysen (March 10, 1942 – March 15, 2017) was an American educator and politician in the state of Washington. He served in the Washington House of Representatives and Washington State Senate as a Democrat. His wife was Toni Lysen.
