= Jeanine Long =

American politician

Member of the Washington Senate from the 44th district
- In office January 9, 1995 – January 13, 2003
- Preceded by: Tim Erwin
- Succeeded by: Dave Schmidt

Member of the Washington House of Representatives from the 44th district
- In office January 14, 1985 – January 12, 1987 Serving with Paul H. King
- Preceded by: Jim Lyon
- Succeeded by: Maria Cantwell
- In office January 3, 1993 – January 9, 1995 Serving with Jim Johnson
- Preceded by: Maria Cantwell
- Succeeded by: Dave Schmidt

Personal details
- Born: September 21, 1928 (age 97) Utah, United States
- Party: Republican
- Spouse: Ken Long
- Children: 5
- Education: University of Washington (BA)

Jeanine H. Long (born 21 September 1928) is an American politician who served in the Washington House of Representatives from the 44th district from 1985 to 1987, and from 1993 to 1995. She then served in the Washington State Senate for the 44th district from 1995 until her retirement in 2003.
