= Luke Esser =

American politician from Washington

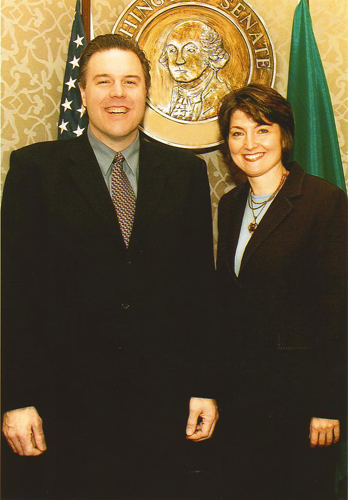
- Esser with Congresswoman Cathy McMorris Rodgers in 2006

Chair of the Washington Republican Party
- In office January 27, 2007 – January 24, 2011
- Preceded by: Diane Tebelius
- Succeeded by: Kirby Wilbur

Member of the Washington Senate from the 48th district
- In office January 13, 2003 – January 8, 2007
- Preceded by: Dan McDonald
- Succeeded by: Rodney Tom

Member of the Washington House of Representatives from the 48th district
- In office January 11, 1999 – January 13, 2003
- Preceded by: Bill Reams
- Succeeded by: Ross Hunter

Personal details
- Born: August 26, 1961 (age 65) Seattle, Washington, U.S.
- Party: Republican
- Education: University of Washington (BA, JD)
- Profession: Journalist, Lawyer

Luke Esser (born August 26, 1961) is an American attorney, journalist, and politician who served as the chairman of the Washington State Republican Party from 2007 to 2011. He was elected on January 27, 2007, when he defeated incumbent chairwoman Diane Tebelius, was re-elected in 2009, but lost to Kirby Wilbur in 2011.

Esser is a former Republican senator in the Washington State Senate, representing the 48th Legislative District. He served as the Majority floor leader for the Washington State Senate. He was defeated for re-election in 2006 by Democratic challenger and former Republican lawmaker Rodney Tom. In the 2004 Republican primary for the eighth Congressional district of Washington he finished third, behind Diane Tebelius and King County Sheriff Dave Reichert. Reichert went on to win the general election and served in that seat until he retired in 2019.

For much of the 1990s, Esser was a contributing writer to Fantasy Football Index, the nation's oldest and largest circulating fantasy football publication.

Esser lives in East Bellevue, Washington and attended St. Louise Parish Catholic Church. He is a graduate of Interlake High School and three times from the University of Washington: Double majored in Editorial Journalism & Accounting, earned a J.D. degree and an M.B.A. degree.
