= Joe McDermott (politician) =

American politician from Washington

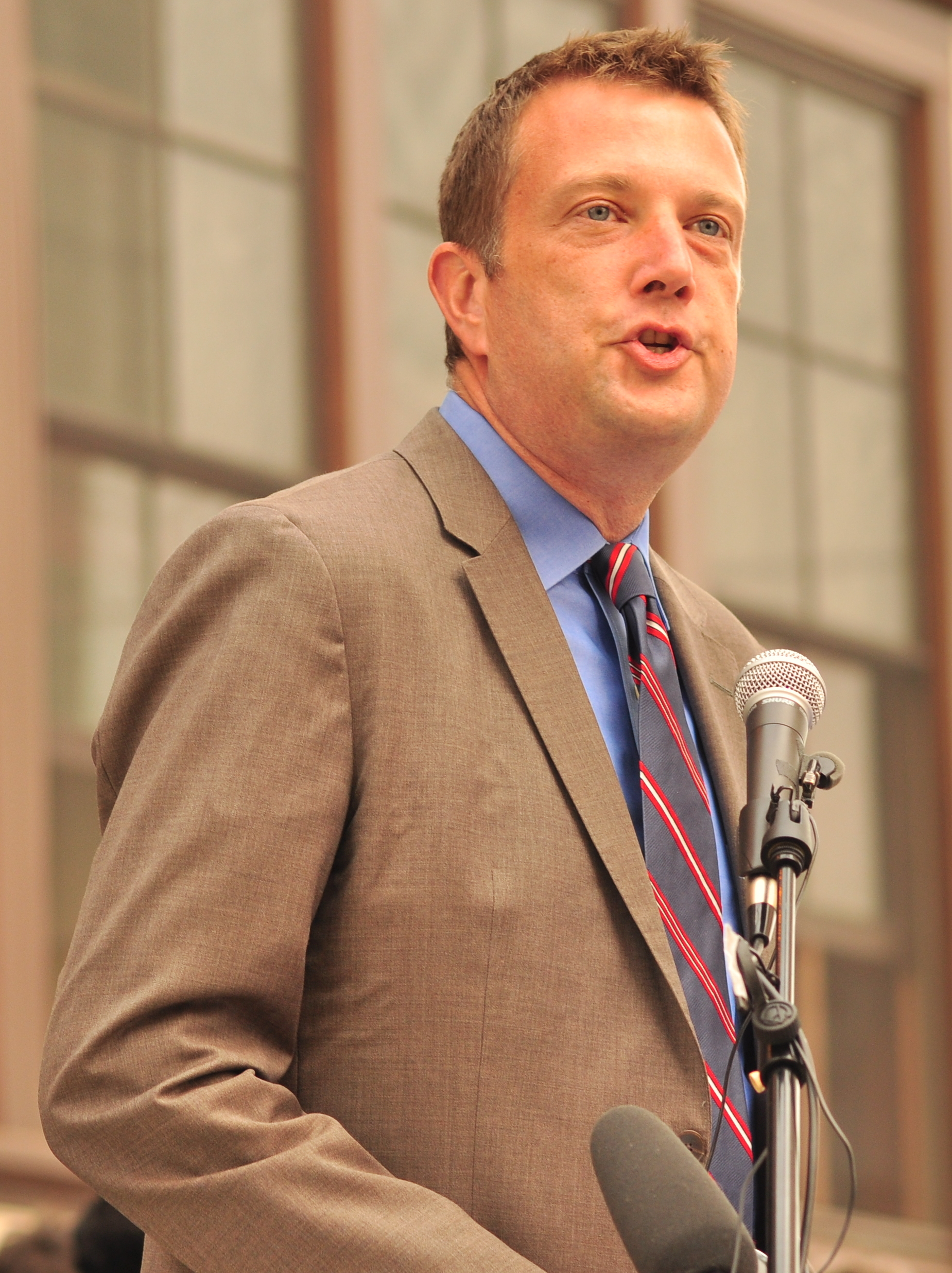
- McDermott in 2017

Chair of the King County Council
- In office January 1, 2016 – January 7, 2019
- Preceded by: Larry Phillips
- Succeeded by: Rod Dembowski

Member of King County Council from the 8th district
- In office November 24, 2010 – January 8, 2024
- Preceded by: Jan Drago
- Succeeded by: Teresa Mosqueda

Member of the Washington Senate from the 34th district
- In office October 15, 2007 – December 2, 2010
- Preceded by: Erik Poulsen
- Succeeded by: Sharon Nelson

Member of the Washington House of Representatives from the 34th district
- In office January 8, 2001 – October 15, 2007
- Preceded by: Dow Constantine
- Succeeded by: Sharon Nelson

Personal details
- Born: July 1, 1967 (age 59)
- Party: Democratic
- Spouse: Michael Culpepper
- Education: Gonzaga University (BA); University of Washington (MPA); Harvard Kennedy School
- Website: www.kingcounty.gov/council/mcdermott.aspx

James Joseph McDermott (born July 1, 1967) is an American politician and a former member of the King County Council. He served ten years as a state legislator: seven years in the Washington House of Representatives and three in the Washington State Senate. In 2023, he announced he would not seek re-election.

== Education ==
After graduating with a Bachelor of Arts in history and political science from Gonzaga University, he earned a Master of Public Administration from the University of Washington.

== Career ==
He went on to work for the Pierce County Prosecuting Attorney and the Seattle Public Schools. In 2009, McDermott completed Harvard University's John F. Kennedy School of Government program for Senior Executives in State and Local Government as a David Bohnett Foundation LGBTQ Victory Institute Leadership Fellow.

=== Washington Legislature ===
McDermott served in the state House from 2001 to 2007. A Democrat, he was re-elected by wide margins in 2002, 2004, and 2006, winning over 80 percent in 2006.

Following the resignation of Senator Erik Poulsen on September 5, 2007, McDermott expressed an interest in being appointed to the 34th district seat in the Washington State Senate. On October 13, 2007, the precinct committee officers (PCOs) of the 34th district recommended McDermott for appointment with 54 of the 65 PCOs voting for him. Two days later, King County Council unanimously appointed him to the seat. He ran unopposed for the remaining two years of Poulsen's Senate term in 2008 but was not a candidate for re-election in 2010.

=== King County Council ===
Instead of seeking re-election to the state senate, in 2010 he ran for King County Council, seeking the 8th district seat that Dow Constantine had vacated when elected King County executive. The seat had temporarily been filled by former Seattle city councilwoman Jan Drago, who had pledged prior to her appointment that she would not run for the position in 2010. McDermott won the seat handily and was sworn in on November 24, 2010.

He is the first openly gay member of King County Council, representing the 8th district.

== Personal life ==
McDermott is a third-generation resident of West Seattle, where he and his husband, Michael Culpepper, make their home. Joe McDermott is not related to Congressman Jim McDermott. In 2016, when Jim McDermott decided to retire from Congress, Joe McDermott ran for the seat. He came third in the crowded primary election, failing to advance to the general election.
