= Lena Swanson =

American politician and activist

Member of the Washington Senate from the 35th district
- In office February 3, 1997 – December 5, 1997
- Preceded by: Brad Owen
- Succeeded by: Tim Sheldon

Personal details
- Born: October 1, 1937 (age 88) Oklahoma, U.S.
- Party: Democratic
- Spouse: Tom

Lena N. Swanson (born October 1, 1937) is an American politician and activist who served as a member of the Washington State Senate, representing the 35th district in 1997. A member of the Democratic Party, she was appointed to fill the vacancy created by Brad Owen's resignation to become lieutenant governor in February 1997 and was subsequently defeated by conservative Democrat Tim Sheldon later that same year.
