= Frank Warnke =

American politician

Member of the Washington Senate from the 31st district
- In office January 10, 1983 – January 14, 1991
- Preceded by: King Lysen
- Succeeded by: Pam Roach

Member of the Washington House of Representatives from the 30th district
- In office January 8, 1973 – January 10, 1983
- Preceded by: Norwood Cunningham
- Succeeded by: Dick Schoon
- In office January 11, 1965 – January 9, 1967
- Preceded by: John Bigley
- Succeeded by: Paul Barden

Personal details
- Born: May 18, 1933 Harlem, Montana, U.S.
- Died: September 23, 2011 (aged 78) Auburn, Washington, U.S.
- Resting place: Mountain View Cemetery (Auburn, Washington)
- Party: Democratic
- Spouse: Beverly
- Children: 2

Military service
- Allegiance: United States
- Branch/service: United States Coast Guard
- Years of service: 1950–1953
- Battles/wars: Korean War

Frank J. Warnke (May 18, 1933 – September 23, 2011) was an American politician of who served in both chambers of the Washington State Legislature.

== Early life and education ==
A Native American, Warnke was born in Harlem, Montana and raised in Auburn, Washington. After graduating from Auburn High School, he studied political science at Central Washington University and the University of Washington. He later served in the United States Coast Guard and was stationed in Ketchikan, Alaska.

== Career ==
After leaving the United States Coast Guard, Warnke worked for Boeing for 10 years. He was elected to the Washington House of Representatives in 1964.

Warnke served 12 years in the Washington House of Representatives for Washington's 30th legislative district and eight years in the Washington State Senate for Washington's 31st legislative district.

Warnke helped create the Public School Employees of Washington (PSE), a union for school district employees, and served 17 years as the organization's executive director. Warnke also drafted legislation to create the Auburn Game Farm Park in Auburn, Washington.

== Personal life ==
Warnke and his wife, Beverly, had two children. He died in Auburn, Washington in 2011.
