= Janéa Holmquist Newbry =

American politician (born 1974)

Member of the Washington Senate from the 13th district
- In office December 6, 2006 – January 12, 2015
- Preceded by: Joyce Mulliken
- Succeeded by: Judith Warnick

Member of the Washington House of Representatives from the 13th district
- In office December 7, 2001 – December 6, 2006
- Preceded by: Gary Chandler
- Succeeded by: Judith Warnick

Personal details
- Born: Janéa Noel Holmquist; December 14, 1974 (age 51) Easton, Washington, U.S.
- Party: Republican
- Spouse: Matthew Lynn Newbry
- Education: Gonzaga University (BA)
- Profession: Insurance Consultant
- Website: Official

Janéa Noel Holmquist Newbry (born December 14, 1974) is an American politician of the Republican Party. She was a member of the Washington State Senate, representing the 13th Legislative District from 2007 to 2015. She previously served in the Washington House of Representatives from 2001 to 2006.

== Background ==
Holmquist Newbry was first elected to the Senate in 2006, after serving 3 terms as the 13th District's State Representative. At 31, she became the youngest female State Senator in Washington history.

She was the chairwoman on the Washington State Senate Commerce and Labor Committee, and also serves on the Trade and Economic Development Committee.

She served on the State Building Codes Council, the Joint Legislative Audit & Review Committee, and the Select Committee on Pension Policy.

== Congressional campaign ==
On February 19, 2014, Holmquist Newbry announced that she would run for Congress in Washington's 4th Congressional District following 10-term Congressman Doc Hastings' announcement that he would not be seeking reelection in 2014.

== Awards ==
- 2014 Guardians of Small Business award. Presented by NFIB.
- Washington Restaurant Association Legislative Hero Award
- Association of Washington Business Jim Mattson Award
- Washington State Potato Commission Legislator of the Year
- Association of General Contractors Legislator of the Year
- Association of General Contractors Legislator of the Year
- Business Institute of Washington's Business Star Award.
- She is also the only legislator to earn the Washington Farm Bureau Legislator of the Year Award two years in a row.

== Education ==
Holmquist Newbry earned her B.A. in Political Science and Sociology from Gonzaga University in Spokane, WA.

== Personal ==
Holmquist Newbry resides in Grant County with her husband, Matt. In 2012 they had a son, Makaio. In early 2013, when Janea left the Senate chambers to nurse her newborn son, Democrats tried to seize the opportunity for a quick vote without her since the Republicans only had a one-vote majority at the time. The effort failed.
