= Dow Constantine =

American politician

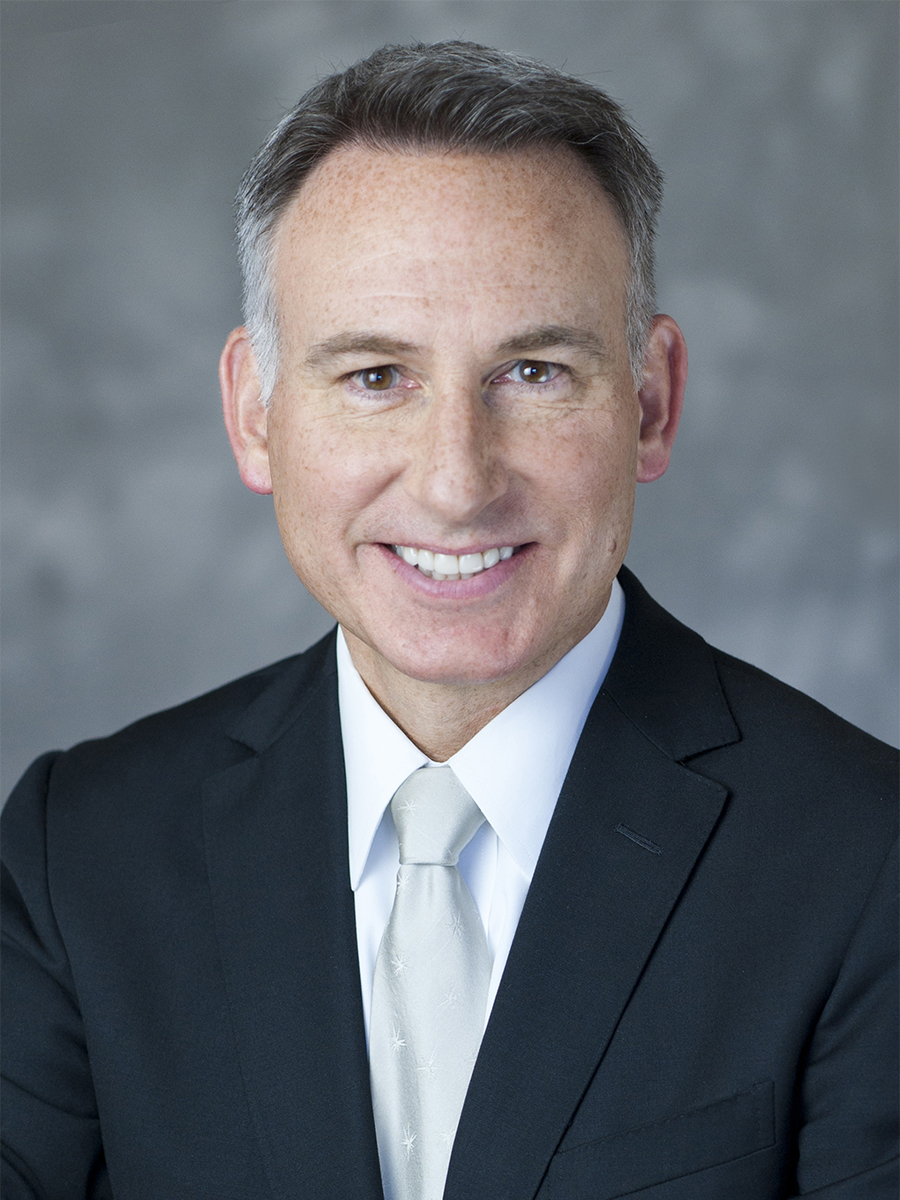
- Constantine in 2013

CEO of Sound Transit
- Incumbent
- Assumed office April 1, 2025
- Preceded by: Goran Sparrman (acting)

8th Executive of King County
- In office November 24, 2009 – March 31, 2025
- Preceded by: Kurt Triplett (acting)
- Succeeded by: Shannon Braddock (acting)

Chair of the King County Council
- In office January 12, 2009 – November 24, 2009
- Preceded by: Julia Patterson
- Succeeded by: Bob Ferguson

Member of the King County Council from the 8th district
- In office January 7, 2002 – November 24, 2009
- Preceded by: Greg Nickels
- Succeeded by: Jan Drago

Member of the Washington Senate from the 34th district
- In office November 26, 2000 – January 7, 2002
- Preceded by: Michael J. Heavey
- Succeeded by: Erik Poulsen

Member of the Washington House of Representatives from the 34th district
- In office January 13, 1997 – November 26, 2000
- Preceded by: Georgette Valle
- Succeeded by: Joe McDermott

Personal details
- Born: James Dow Constantine; November 15, 1961 (age 64) Seattle, Washington, U.S.
- Party: Democratic
- Spouse: Shirley Carlson
- Children: 1
- Education: University of Washington (BA, JD, MUP)
- Website: Sound Transit website

James Dow Constantine (born November 15, 1961) is an American lawyer, urban planner, and politician who is the chief executive officer of Sound Transit. He was appointed in 2025 after resigning as county executive of King County, Washington, a position he had held since 2009. A member of the Democratic Party, (Note: The office of King County Executive is nonpartisan, but Constantine identifies as a member of the Democratic Party.) Constantine served on the King County Council from 2002 to 2009, and in the Washington State Legislature from 1997 to 2002.

== Early life and education ==
The son of John and Lois Constantine, he was born and raised in West Seattle. In 1980, he graduated from West Seattle High School, where he was student body president and an Eagle Scout. He attended the University of Washington (UW), receiving a Bachelor of Arts in political science and graduating as a member of the Phi Kappa Sigma fraternity. Constantine also served an internship with Washington's 34th Legislative District representative Phil Talmadge. While attending law school, Constantine worked as a disk jockey for the college radio station KCMU. In 1989, Constantine earned a J.D. degree from the University of Washington School of Law. Constantine later returned to obtain a master's degree in urban planning from UW in 1992.

== Career ==
Constantine opened a private law practice in 1990. He served as chair of the 34th District Democrats organization and worked as an aide for King County Council member Greg Nickels. Constantine was elected to the state house of representatives in 1996. He won re-election in 1998. In 2001, he became a Washington state senator. He left the state senate in 2002 after being appointed to the King County Council to replace Nickels, who had been elected Seattle mayor. Constantine was a King County Council member from 2002 to 2009, representing the eighth district, which includes West Seattle, parts of Southeast Seattle, North Highline, Burien, Vashon Island, Maury Island, Normandy Park, and parts of both SeaTac and Tukwila. In 2009, he served as council chair.

=== 2009 election ===
Constantine announced his candidacy for King County Executive on February 16, 2009, to replace Ron Sims who was appointed the United States Deputy Secretary of Housing and Urban Development. In the primary election, Constantine received 22% of the votes to advance to a runoff against candidate Susan Hutchison, who received 37%. Described as "perhaps the most contentious race on the November [2009] ballot" by Seattle NPR outlet KPLU, the campaign was characterized as negative campaigning, including "mudslinging" ads paid for by the candidates' supporters.

Constantine received press attention for stressing the conservative affiliations of Hutchison, pointing to her involvement with the Discovery Institute and contributions to Republican candidates such as President Bush in 2004 and Mike Huckabee in 2008. Hutchison downplayed any perceived partisanship and criticized Constantine as a political insider with close ties to labor unions.

In October 2009, the Washington State Public Disclosure Commission (PDC) investigated allegations that Constantine's campaign illegally coordinated with an independent campaign on anti-Hutchison ads. The PDC concluded there was no coordination and dismissed the complaint. The PDC also investigated complaints regarding Hutchison's campaign on allegations that campaign contributions exceeded single election limits and that expenditures by the campaign were not properly documented. The PDC imposed a $100 fine against Hutchison for exceeding campaign limits and dismissed the failure-to-report allegations.

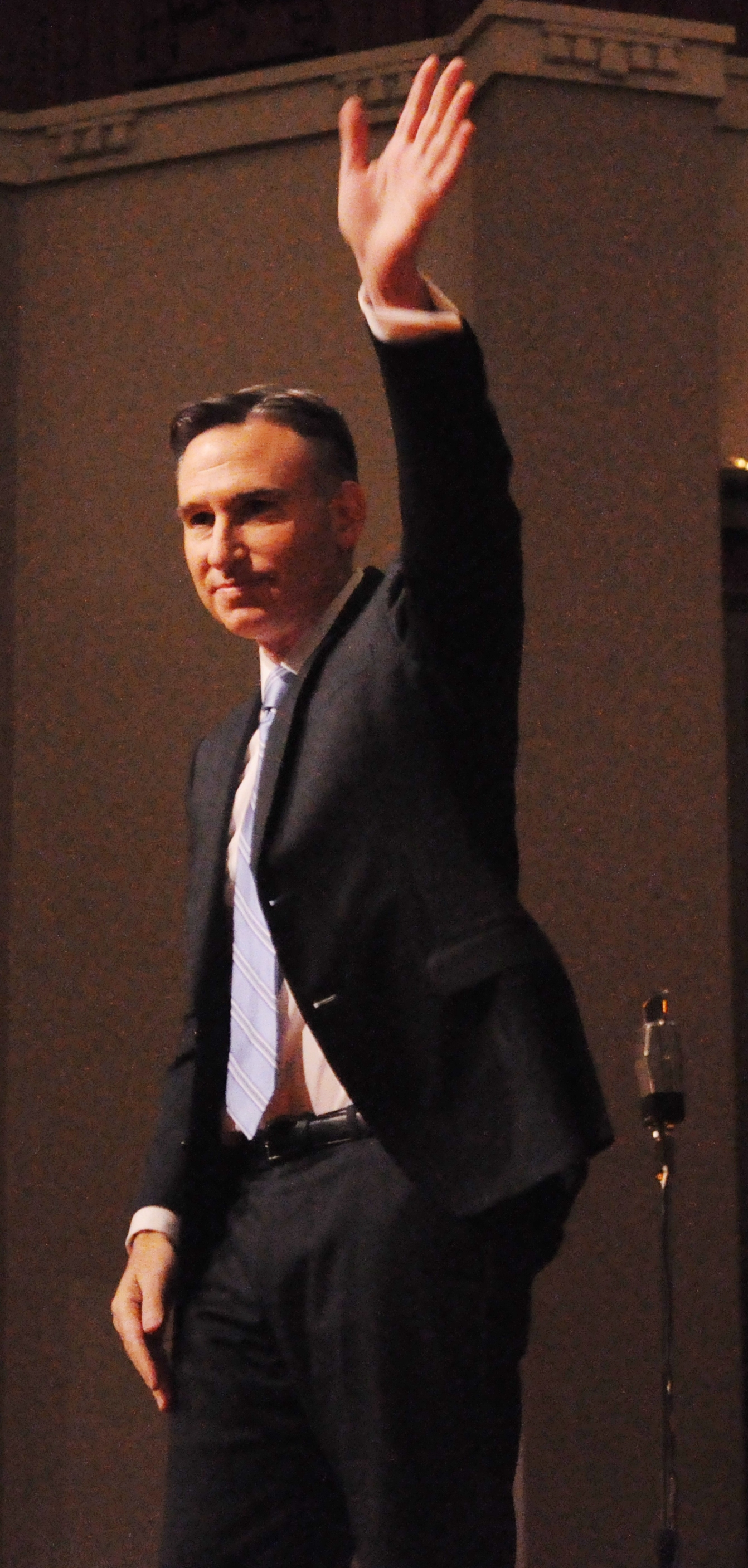
Constantine acknowledges crowd applause after taking the oath of office as King County Executive.

Constantine was endorsed by Governor Christine Gregoire, Seattle Mayor Greg Nickels, US Senators Patty Murray and Maria Cantwell, Washington State Senate Majority Leader Lisa Brown as well as state Senators Ed Murray, Ken Jacobsen, Joe McDermott, and Karen Keiser. Organizations that endorsed Constantine included NARAL Pro-Choice Washington, the Sierra Club, the Cascade Bicycle Club, International Association of Machinists and Aerospace Workers and the UFCW.

On election night, November 3, the initial batch of election results had Constantine winning the election over Hutchison, at that time receiving 57% to her 43%. He was expected to replace interim Executive Kurt Triplett on November 24 following the certification of election results by the King County Elections' Canvassing Board. Constantine was ultimately declared the winner, and was inaugurated November 24, 2009.

=== Potential gubernatorial campaign ===
In early 2019, Constantine was mentioned as a possible candidate for governor of Washington in the 2020 election. Two-term incumbent Jay Inslee was constitutionally eligible to run for a third term but had opted to mount a campaign for president of the United States in the 2020 election instead, leaving the governor's office open. Several Democrats expressed interest in running should it be an open election but did not want to challenge Inslee. Facing poor polling numbers, Inslee decided to suspend his presidential campaign on August 21 and announced the next day he would indeed seek a third term as governor. Constantine, along with several other potential candidates, released a statement that he would not be running in 2020 and would instead focus on his own 2021 reelection campaign.

=== King County Executive ===
Constantine is the longest-serving county executive in King County history. During his tenure, he was also a member of the Sound Transit Board and chaired the board during the development of the Sound Transit 3 ballot initiative, which passed in 2016. Constantine was re-elected to a fourth term in 2021 with 55% of the vote against general-election opponent Joe Nguyen, a state senator. Constantine announced in November 2024 that he would not run for re-election as King County Executive once his term expired in 2025.

==== Covid-19 ====
On August 9, 2021 Constantine in coordination with Governor Jay Inslee and Seattle Mayor Jenny Durkan announced a vaccine mandate for government employees and private healthcare workers.On September 7, 2021, Constantine and King County Health Officer Dr. Jeff Duchin announced a vaccine passport for all indoor venues. On October 25, 2021, the policy requiring proof of vaccination or a negative test to enter an indoor venue went into effect in the county. Calls to remove the employee mandate grew in early 2022. Councilman Reagan Dunn, citing the Sheriff's Department's high vacancies for his concern and Epidemiologist Dr. Ali Mokdad, with the Institute for Health Metrics at the University of Washington, cited dropping infection drops in his call to scrap the mandates. The passport was repealed in February 2022, with the employee mandate being repealed the following year. King County ultimately fired 300 government workers over the employee mandate including 43 police officers.

=== Sound Transit ===
On March 27, 2025, Constantine was selected as the CEO of Sound Transit by the board of directors. He had been among five finalists for the position and was a member of the Sound Transit board during the selection process. Constantine had also appointed the nine members of the board who represent King County, which led to accusations of a conflict of interest. Constantine took over the position on April 1 after he resigned as King County Executive and was replaced by deputy executive Shannon Braddock.

== Personal life ==
Constantine is married to Shirley Carlson, whom he met while working at the University of Washington radio station. They live in North Admiral, Seattle and have one child.
