= Rodney Tom =

American businessman and politician from Washington

Majority Leader of the Washington Senate
- In office December 10, 2012 – December 1, 2014
- Preceded by: Lisa Brown
- Succeeded by: Mark Schoesler

Member of the Washington Senate from the 48th district
- In office January 8, 2007 – January 12, 2015
- Preceded by: Luke Esser
- Succeeded by: Cyrus Habib

Member of the Washington House of Representatives from the 48th district
- In office January 13, 2003 – January 8, 2007
- Preceded by: Steve Van Luven
- Succeeded by: Deborah Eddy

Personal details
- Born: July 25, 1963 (age 63) Bellevue, Washington, U.S.
- Party: Republican (before 2006); Democratic (2006–present)
- Other political affiliations: Majority Coalition Caucus (2012–2015)
- Education: University of Washington (BA); University of Southern California (MBA)

Rodney Tom (born July 25, 1963) is an American businessman and politician who represented Washington's 48th Legislative District in the state Senate.

== Education ==
Tom earned a Bachelor of Arts degree from the University of Washington in 1985 and went on to earn his MBA from the University of Southern California in 1988.

== Career ==
In 1989, Tom began a career as a realtor with Windermere Real Estate.

In 2002, Tom was elected to the state House of Representatives as a Republican by defeating Democrat Connie Espe by a 52 to 42% margin, with 5% going to a third-party candidate.

He was reelected in 2004, edging out Democratic Party challenger Debi Golden with a 51.76% to 48.24% margin (1816 votes).

On March 14, 2006, Tom announced that he was switching to the Democratic Party and challenging Luke Esser. This announcement caused no small amount of controversy, as Tom's 2004 Democratic opponent, Debi Golden, had already declared her intention to run for the state Senate in the 48th district, which brought the two together for a rematch of their 2004 race. However, two weeks later, Golden ended her candidacy, citing the expense and futility of a primary battle, leaving Tom unopposed for the Democratic nomination. He defeated incumbent Republican Luke Esser with 53% of the vote.

On July 17, 2007, Tom publicly announced his campaign for the 8th District's congressional seat. He soon ended the campaign and endorsed Darcy Burner (D), who was the challenger to Dave Reichert (R) in 2006 and had a major lead in fundraising.

On November 2, 2010, Tom ran in the Washington State Senate in the 48th Legislative District and defeated Gregg Bennett by a 52.55% to 47.30% margin.

In 2012, Tom and Tim Sheldon, both conservative Democrats in the state Senate, announced they would switch caucuses and join 23 Republicans to form the Majority Coalition Caucus, with a 25-24 vote majority over the Democratic caucus.

On April 14, 2014 Tom announced he would not seek reelection citing health concerns and the need to take care of his father.

On March 29, 2018 Tom announced his intention to run for state Senate again in the 48th Legislative District, but was not elected.

== Controversies ==
=== Budget coup ===
On March 2, 2012, Tom joined with fellow Democratic Sens. Jim Kastama and Tim Sheldon and 22 Senate Republicans to push through a revised budget bill. The revised bill he supports contains significant cuts to public services and public education. He justified his actions by saying, "Since before this legislative session began, the message from my constituents has been loud and clear. Another budget that is unsustainable, relies upon accounting gimmicks and sets our state up for a perennial deficit is simply unacceptable. If we ever want to get ahead of our budget crises, our state needs wholesale government reform and a budget that reflects our commitment to sustainable governing."

=== Majority Coalition Caucus ===
On December 10, 2012, Tom announced that he would caucus with the Republicans to form the Majority Coalition Caucus (MCC). Tom became the new senate majority leader.

On February 4, 2013, both Tom and Tim Sheldon, another Democratic senator who joined Republicans to form the MCC, were censured by the state Democratic Party for "gross disloyalty" and "perfidious behavior," cutting off their future access to party funds and mailing lists. This followed separate votes to censure Tom by the 5th and 43rd District Democratic organizations, Democrats in Tom's own 48th District, and the Pierce County Democrats.

Amid the censures, state Republicans urged support of Tom.

== Personal life ==
Tom's wife is Deborah. They have two children.

Washington State Senate
Preceded by Lisa Brown	Majority Leader of the Washington Senate; 2012–2014	Succeeded by Mark Schoesler
