= Erik Poulsen (American politician) =

American politician

Member of the Washington Senate from the 34th district
- In office January 7, 2002 – October 1, 2007
- Preceded by: Dow Constantine
- Succeeded by: Joe McDermott

Member of the Washington House of Representatives from the 34th district
- In office January 9, 1995 – January 7, 2002
- Preceded by: Michael J. Heavey
- Succeeded by: Toni Lysen

Personal details
- Born: Erik Edmund Poulsen; August 3, 1964 (age 62) Milwaukee, Wisconsin, U.S.
- Party: Democratic
- Education: University of Wisconsin–Madison
- Profession: Government Relations

Erik Edmund Poulsen (born August 3, 1964) is the former Washington State Senator and Washington State Representative from Washington's 34th Legislative District, a district that includes West Seattle, Vashon Island, and Burien. Before getting elected, he served on the staff of Les Aspin, former Member of Congress and U.S. Defense Secretary, and Wisconsin Governor Tony Earl.

Poulsen served from 1995-2002 in the House, where he was Chair of the Energy, Technology & Telecommunications Committee. In this role, he led efforts to expand telecommunications and broadband access in rural Washington and is widely credited with derailing Enron's legislative scheme to deregulate energy markets in Washington State. He was the only freshman Democrat appointed to the powerful House Appropriations Committee and was placed in a leadership position on the House Education Committee.

In 2002 Poulsen was appointed to the Senate, where he served as Chair of the Water, Energy & Environment Committee, Democratic leader of the Senate Capital Budget Committee, and member of the Senate Transportation Committee. His crowning achievement in the Senate was working across party lines to broker the historic Columbia River Agreement in 2006, which helped end the decades-long impasse over water rights on the Columbia and lower Snake rivers. He also became a leading voice for grizzly bear recovery in Washington's North Cascades wilderness.

Poulsen was named 2005 Legislator of the Year by Washington Conservation Voters, which wrote:

"Long an advocate for clean and affordable energy, Senator Erik Poulsen had an opportunity to deliver on this and other issues in 2005, and he took full advantage.

Senator Poulsen was the prime sponsor of the High Performance Green Buildings legislation, one of the environmental community’s priorities. Success of that bill makes Washington the first state in the nation to require state buildings, schools and universities to be built and certified as high performance green buildings. As a result, our state will save energy and water, we will improve student learning and employee performance, and these buildings will be operated more cheaply. Senator Poulsen was successful in pulling together bipartisan support for this legislation, a key to its success.

As Chair of the Water, Energy & Environment Committee, Senator Poulsen was involved in advancing the Clean Cars bill through the Senate. The legislation adopts California’s vehicle emission standards. Supporters stated that the measure would reduce certain vehicle emissions, expand consumer vehicle options, and improve fuel efficiency. The bill was brought to the Senate floor and later delivered to the Governor for signature.

It is also worth noting that Senator Poulsen chairs the most powerful environmental committee in the Senate, giving him jurisdiction over each of the environmental community’s priorities during this biennium, and he never failed to deliver. Senator Poulsen is a proven environmental champion, and thus WCV was happy to announce him as Legislator of the Year in 2005."

That same year, Poulsen received the Northwest Energy Coalition's Bob Olsen Memorial Conservation Eagle Award. The Eagle is NWEC's highest honor, awarded annually to recognize individual or organizational leadership for a clean and affordable energy future.

Poulsen left the Legislature in 2007 to become Director of Government Relations for the Washington Public Utility Districts Association. In 2012 he took a sabbatical to lead a humanitarian project in Zambezi, Zambia. He returned stateside to Spokane, Washington, where he spent five years as Government Relations Director for Greater Spokane Incorporated and today heads Intergovernmental Affairs for the City of Spokane. Erik and his family live in rural Valleyford, Washington.
