= Dave Schmidt (politician) =

Former American politician from Washington, current webinar host

Member of the Washington Senate from the 44th district
- In office January 13, 2003 – January 8, 2007
- Preceded by: Jeanine H. Long
- Succeeded by: Steve Hobbs

Member of the Washington House of Representatives from the 44th district
- In office January 9, 1995 – January 13, 2003
- Preceded by: Jeanine H. Long
- Succeeded by: Hans Dunshee

Personal details
- Born: Newberg, Oregon, U.S.
- Party: Republican
- Occupation: Webinar Host

Dave Schmidt is the host of The Sedona Connection and a former Washington State politician who served from 1995 to 2007. In 2023, a U.S. court found him liable for civil fraud for his role in promoting Meta 1 Coin, a digital currency investment scheme the Securities and Exchange Commission (SEC) deemed fraudulent.

== Political career ==
He served in the Washington House of Representatives from 1994 to 2002 and was elected to the Washington State Senate in 2002, representing the 44th legislative district. He lost his Senate seat in 2006 to Democrat Steve Hobbs and unsuccessfully ran again in 2010.

== Campaign Fund Misuse ==
In 2012, Schmidt agreed to pay a $10,000 fine to the Washington Public Disclosure Commission to settle allegations that he had misspent leftover campaign funds from his 2006 reelection campaign.

== Meta 1 Coin Fraud and SEC Charges ==
In March 2020, Schmidt was charged by the SEC for promoting a fraudulent cryptocurrency called Meta 1 Coin. Alongside partners Robert Dunlap and Nicole Bowdler, Schmidt claimed the coin was backed by billions of dollars in gold and art and promised extraordinary investment returns. Instead, investor funds were used for personal expenses and luxury items. All Meta 1 Coin content previously posted by Schmidt has since been removed from his platforms.

Further investigations revealed the full extent of the fraud. While the SEC initially cited over $4.3 million raised from investors, later findings by the Arizona Corporation Commission and charges from the Department of Justice reported that the scheme affected more than 300 victims, with total losses exceeding $10 million.

=== Denial of Involvement ===
Schmidt has publicly denied wrongdoing related to the Meta 1 Coin scam. In April 2019, during a radio broadcast, Schmidt and fellow Meta 1 trustee Robert Dunlap claimed they met with an SEC representative who was “impressed” with their operations and purchased coins. However, it was later revealed that no such meeting with the SEC took place. In January 2020, Schmidt and Dunlap also falsely asserted that KPMG was auditing the Meta 1 Coin's gold assets and described the coin as “the highest rated digital asset known at this time.” These statements were part of efforts to present the project as legitimate, despite allegations and subsequent legal actions.

=== Final Judgement ===
In 2023, a court found Schmidt legally responsible for the fraud and ordered him to pay fines and penalties.

== The Sedona Connection ==
After leaving politics, Schmidt launched The Sedona Connection in 2013 and has actively maintained it since. The platform includes a website, seminars, and a YouTube channel focused on financial, political, and metaphysical topics. He is best known in this context for promoting the idea of a "global currency reset," claiming access to insider information and alleged ties to secretive groups like the "Dragon Family."

During the period when Schmidt was promoting Meta 1 Coin, he appeared to scale back public discussion of the currency reset concept. However, following legal proceedings, he resumed promoting the idea and continues to encourage investments in foreign currencies such as the Vietnamese dong, which he asserts will gain value significantly following a future reset. He regularly shares updates via his YouTube channel and continues to host paid workshops and webinars centered on these themes.

Despite legal rulings holding him responsible for fraud related to Meta 1 Coin, Schmidt continues to promote similar financial theories through paid workshops and webinars.
