= Tim Sheldon =

American farmer, businessman and politician from Washington

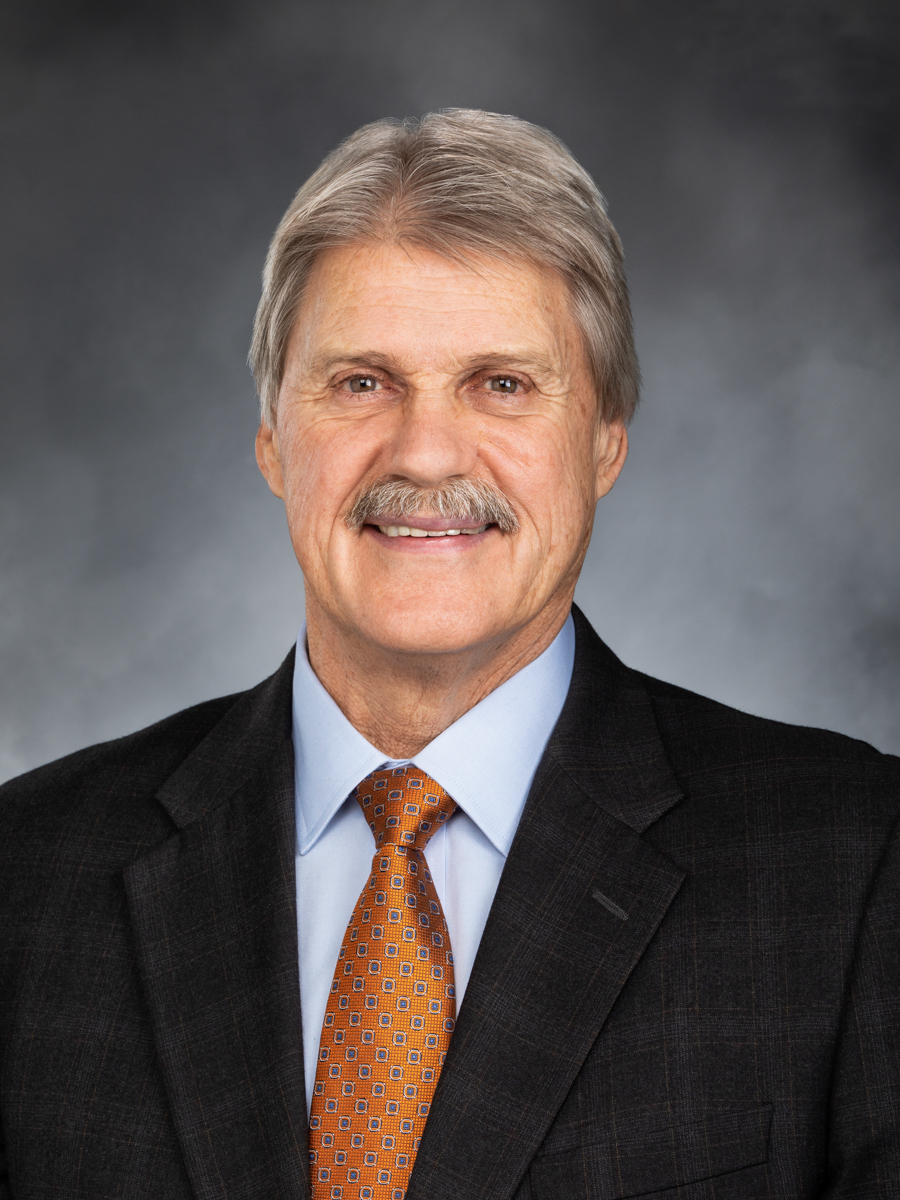

President pro tempore of the Washington Senate
- In office January 3, 2017 – November 21, 2017
- Preceded by: Pam Roach
- Succeeded by: Karen Keiser
- In office December 10, 2012 – January 12, 2015
- Preceded by: Margarita Prentice
- Succeeded by: Pam Roach

Member of the Washington Senate from the 35th district
- In office December 5, 1997 – January 9, 2023
- Preceded by: Lena Swanson
- Succeeded by: Drew MacEwen

Member of the Washington House of Representatives from the 35th district
- In office January 14, 1991 – December 5, 1997
- Preceded by: Max Vekich
- Succeeded by: William Eickmeyer

Mason County Commissioner
- In office January 1, 2005 – January 1, 2017
- Preceded by: Wes Johnson
- Succeeded by: Kevin Shutty

Personal details
- Born: Timothy Markham Sheldon; March 9, 1947 (age 79) Shelton, Washington, U.S.
- Party: Democratic
- Other political affiliations: Majority Coalition Caucus (2012–2017); Republican Caucus (2017–2023)
- Spouse: Linda
- Children: 1
- Education: University of Pennsylvania (BS); University of Washington (MBA)
- Website: Official website

Timothy Markham Sheldon (born March 9, 1947) is an American farmer, businessman, and politician who served as a member of the Washington State Senate, representing the 35th District from 1997 to 2023. The district includes all of Mason County and parts of Thurston and Kitsap counties. A member of the Democratic Party, he caucused with the Republican-dominated Majority Coalition Caucus and afterward the Republican caucus from 2012. He represented Mason County as a Mason County Commissioner for District 2 from 2005 to 2017 and served as a member of the Washington House of Representatives from 1991 to 1997.

== Early life and education ==
Sheldon was born and raised in Mason County, Washington. He attended public schools until he entered the Wharton School of Business at the University of Pennsylvania in 1965, graduating in 1969 with a Bachelor of Science degree in Economics. He earned his Master of Business Administration at the University of Washington.

== Career ==
Following a decade of work in economic development for Native American tribes, Sheldon began a new career as executive director of the non-profit Mason County Economic Development Council, a post he held for 18 years.

First elected to the Washington House of Representatives for a term beginning in 1991, Sheldon served three terms there before being elected to the State Senate in 1997, defeating incumbent appointed Democrat Lena Swanson. During his tenure, Sheldon served as vice chair of the Energy Environment & Telecommunications Committee, and sat on the Rules and Transportation committees.

Sheldon was an opponent of state funding for the Mariners and Seahawks sports stadiums, calling the proposed legislation "corporate welfare." He also voted against budgets when his party supported them. He voted for Republican George W. Bush in 2004 and then Democrat Barack Obama in 2008. He was one of three Democratic state senators to vote against the gay-marriage bill. He later expressed regret over the vote and his opposition to LGBTQ rights, saying in a 2022 interview announcing his retirement that he had "tried to make up for it" with his votes in later years.

After the 2012 state legislature elections, he and Senator Rodney Tom joined the Republicans in a "Majority Coalition Caucus," resulting in a power sharing agreement, effectively giving the two Democrats control of the state senate along with 23 Republicans. The Caucus chaired the most powerful committees (such as ways and means, commerce and labor, and K-12 education, among others) for the 2013-14 session, and a few committees, such as transportation were claimed as "bi-partisan", co-chaired with the Democratic Caucus. Sheldon subsequently became president pro tempore of the Senate, elected by both Democrats and Republicans. He lost this position in 2015 when Democrats withdrew support in favor of Republican Pam Roach. After Roach won a seat on the Pierce County Council in the 2016 election, Tim Sheldon, once again, became president pro tempore of the Washington State Senate. Due to the special election held in November 2017, the Senate returned to a Democratic 25–24 majority. Sheldon once again lost his position as President Pro Tempore. Democrat Karen Keiser now occupied the position.

The Majority Caucus was subsequently dissolved and replaced by a normal Republican Caucus, which Sheldon, while retaining his Democratic party registration, joined. In March 2022, Sheldon announced that he would not run for reelection. He left office in 2023.

== Awards ==
- 2014 Guardians of Small Business award. Presented by NFIB.

Washington State Senate
Preceded by Margarita Prentice	President pro tempore of the Washington Senate; 2012–2015	Succeeded by Pam Roach
