= Judy Warnick =

American politician from Washington

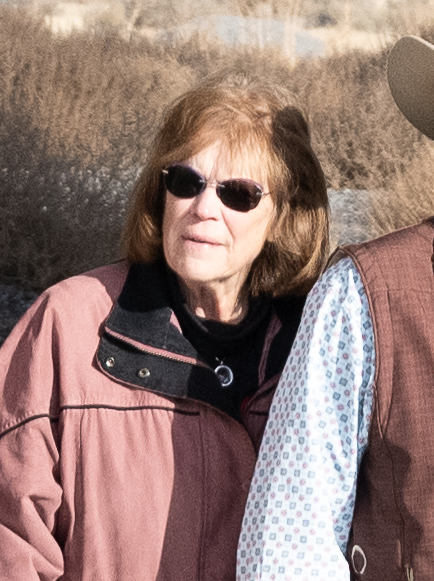

Member of the Washington State Senate from the 13th district
- Incumbent
- Assumed office January 12, 2015
- Preceded by: Janéa Holmquist Newbry

Member of the Washington House of Representatives from the 13th district
- In office January 8, 2007 – January 12, 2015
- Preceded by: Janéa Holmquist Newbry
- Succeeded by: Tom Dent

Personal details
- Born: Judith May Knapp; May 28, 1950 (age 76) Spokane, Washington, U.S.
- Party: Republican
- Spouse: Roy
- Children: 3
- Education: Fort Wright College
- Occupation: Politician
- Website: Official

Judith May Warnick (née Knapp, born May 28, 1950) is an American politician who is a member of the Republican Party. She is a member of the Washington State Senate, representing the 13th Legislative District since 2015. She was a member of the Washington House of Representatives, from 2007-2015.

== Early life and career ==
Warnick was raised on a dairy farm near Deer Park. After attending Fort Wright College, she started a business in Moses Lake. She became the first woman to serve as president of the Moses Lake Chamber of Commerce.

== Personal life ==
Warnick's husband is Roy. They have three children. Warnick and her family live in Moses Lake, Washington.

== Awards ==
- 2020 Guardians of Small Business. Presented by NFIB.
