= Jeanne Kohl-Welles =

American politician (born 1942)

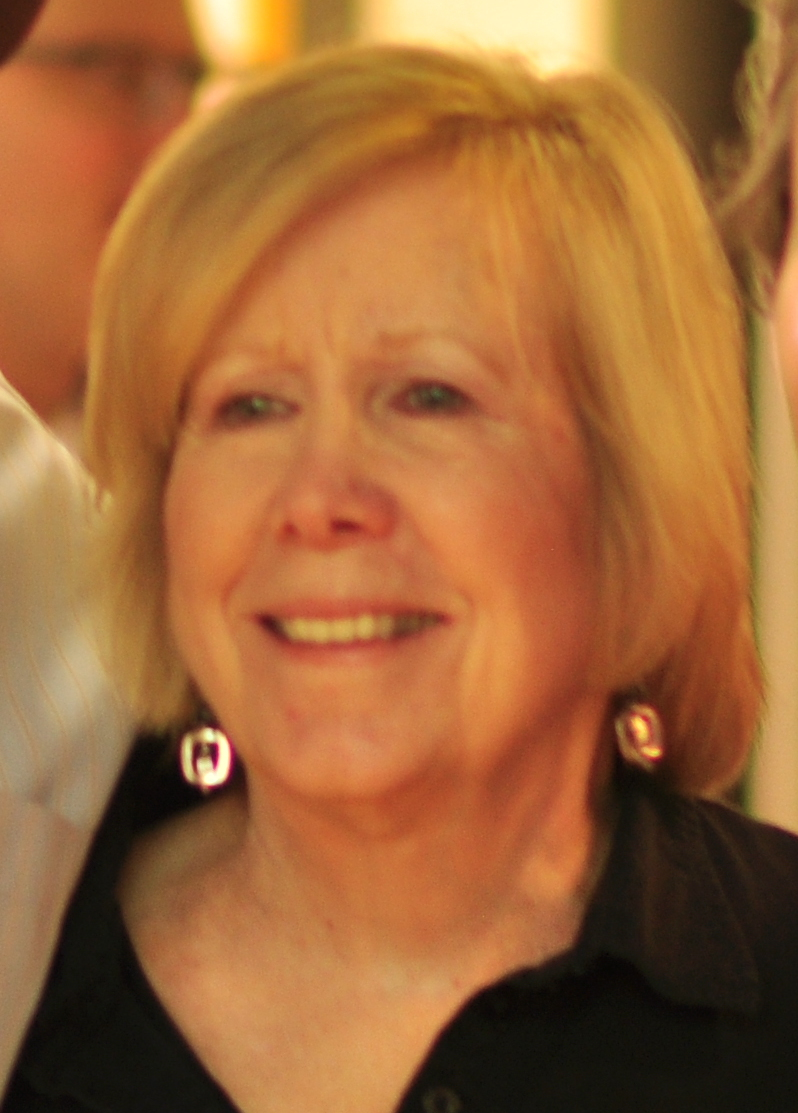
- Kohl-Welles in 2017

Member of the King County Council from the 4th district
- In office January 1, 2016 – December 31, 2024
- Preceded by: Larry Phillips
- Succeeded by: Jorge Barón

Member of the Washington Senate from the 36th district
- In office October 14, 1994 – December 31, 2015
- Preceded by: Ray Moore
- Succeeded by: Reuven Carlyle

Member of the Washington House of Representatives from the 36th district
- In office January 13, 1992 – October 14, 1994
- Preceded by: Larry Phillips
- Succeeded by: Mary Lou Dickerson

Personal details
- Born: Jean Elizabeth Pearl Kohl; October 19, 1942 (age 83) Madison, Wisconsin, U.S.
- Party: Democratic
- Spouses: Jackson F. Hill (m. 1962–1972) Kenneth D. Jenkins (m. 1973–1980) Alex Welles (m. 1985)
- Children: 5
- Education: California State University, Northridge (BA, MA); University of California, Los Angeles (MA, PhD)
- Website: Official

Jeanne Elizabeth Pearl Kohl-Welles (née Jean Elizabeth Pearl Kohl; October 19, 1942) is an American politician and academic. She was a member of the King County Council from the 4th district from 2016 to 2024. She previously served as a member of the Washington State Senate from 1994 to 2015 and the Washington House of Representatives from 1992 to 1994.

== Early life and education ==
Kohl-Welles was born in Madison, Wisconsin. She earned a Bachelor of Arts and Master of Arts in education from the California State University, Northridge, followed by a Master of Arts and PhD in sociology from the University of California, Los Angeles.

== Career ==
Kohl-Welles was a teacher in the Los Angeles Unified School District. She has also worked as a lecturer at Chapman College; University of California, Irvine; California State University, Long Beach; and California State University, Fullerton. She was a program manager for the United States Department of Education and later worked as a visiting professor at Pacific Lutheran University.

Outside of academics, Kohl-Welles has provided expert testimony in Title IX lawsuits.

From 1992 to 1994, she was a member of the Washington House of Representatives. Kohl-Welles was appointed to the State Senate in 1994. A member of the Democratic Party, she represented the 36th district in the Washington State Senate until 2016. Her district included Ballard, Belltown, Blue Ridge, Crown Hill, Greenwood, Magnolia, and Queen Anne Hill neighborhoods of Seattle as well as the north half of Downtown Seattle. The district also takes the western half of Lake Union.

Kohl-Welles announced that she would run for the King County Council in 2015. She won a seat representing District 4 and was re-elected in 2019. Kohl-Welles retired at the end of her term in 2023.

== Awards and honors ==
Kohl-Welles was a recipient of the 2009 Fuse "Sizzle" Awards Committee Chair of the Year Award. The award recognized Kohl-Welles work on predatory lending reforms, updates to strengthen and simplify Washington State's Consumer Protection Act, and good government reforms to prevent trade associations from diverting workers compensation funds into political campaigns.

== Criticism ==
Using data and projections compiled by the Washington State Office of Financial Management, Freedom Foundation aggregated bills introduced in the 2008 legislative session in order to determine the total increased taxes and fees proposed by each individual legislator, as primary or co-sponsor, would bring to taxpayers over a ten-year period. Kohl-Welles topped the list of legislators. Her bills have been predicted to bring total of $214,327,749,698 of increases in taxes and fees to Washington taxpayers.
