= Pam Roach =

American politician from Washington

Member of the Pierce County Council from the 2nd District
- In office January 3, 2017 – January 13, 2021
- Preceded by: Joyce McDonald
- Succeeded by: Hans Zeiger

President pro tempore of the Washington Senate
- In office January 12, 2015 – January 3, 2017
- Preceded by: Tim Sheldon
- Succeeded by: Tim Sheldon

Member of the Washington Senate from the 31st district
- In office January 14, 1991 – January 3, 2017
- Preceded by: Frank Warnke
- Succeeded by: Phil Fortunato

Personal details
- Born: Pamela Jean Norris; April 26, 1948 (age 78) San Diego, California, U.S.
- Party: Republican
- Spouse: Jim Roach
- Children: 5
- Education: Brigham Young University

Pamela Jean Roach (née Norris; born April 26, 1948) is an American politician who was a member of the Pierce County Council from 2017 to 2021. A member of the Republican Party, she served as a member of the Washington State Senate, representing the 31st district from 1991 to 2017.

== Elected office ==
Roach was elected to the Senate in 1990, 1994, 1998, 2002, 2006, 2010, and 2014. Her last term would have expired in January 2019, but she was elected to the Pierce County Council and resigned her Senate seat in January 2017.

She ran for governor in 1996, finishing in 8th place out of 15 candidates in the jungle primary with 2.43% of the vote.

=== Censures and sanctions while senator ===
In 2003, Roach was reprimanded and asked to seek counseling after she allegedly illegally obtained employee e-mails and drove some to quit.

In 2010, fellow Senate Republicans banned her from the Senate Caucus after colleagues said she had repeatedly mistreated staff. Roach attributed the sanction to rough politics, and said she was not informed of the complaints or accusers. Republicans barred her from the caucus room, though she could still vote on the Senate Floor. While sanctioned, Roach abused a Republican staffer charged to uphold the sanction. The Facilities and Operations Committee reaffirmed their 2010 sanctions in a 2012 legal settlement with a senior Republican attorney who claimed he was subjected to a hostile and abusive workplace because of Roach, which included a verbal dispute about limits on use of the official website provided to each Senator. Roach apologized after the dispute, but attributed the Committee ruling to a harassment campaign against her. Senate authorities sanctioned Roach five times during 20 years as a Senator.

Senate Republican leadership lifted the sanctions in February 2012, and Roach said the sanctions had no merit. Not long after Roach was invited into the Senate Republican caucus, Senate Republicans—along with three Democrats—used Roach's deciding vote for an obscure procedural motion to wrest control of the budget writing process away from the Democratic caucus and pass their own budget. Shortly after returning to the Republican caucus, Roach again engaged in speech that frightened staff.

In 2016, Roach was removed from a human trafficking task force by Lt. Governor Brad Owen in a letter that mentioned numerous complaints about comments Roach made in a meeting about sex traffic victims, suggesting tattoos and nose rings contributed to young girls becoming victims of human trafficking. Owen called the comments "vile," and said her history of "egregious and offensive behavior" disqualified Roach from keeping her seat in the Senate. Roach said she said nothing inappropriate during the meeting, but had offered specific job-seeking guidance sex traffic victims should consider. She attributed frustration to slow organization by officials.

=== County councilmember ===
After her election, Roach resigned from the state Senate and became a councilmember for Pierce County, Washington in January 2017.

In August 2017, county executive Bruce Dammeier issued a letter to department directors and staffers, directing them to communicate with Roach only in writing or in public council meetings. Dammeier's memo cited "rude and unprofessional behavior" with county staff as the basis for the restrictions. Roach, in response, asserted that the strictures were based on politics.

During a council offsite meeting in 2018, Roach uttered a profane word to her son Dan Roach, who was also a councilmember, during a heated discussion. Roach later issued a statement saying: "In the heat of the moment, I used harsh words that I regret. It was a mistake. I love my son dearly but sometimes we have political disagreements. Nonetheless, that's no excuse for harsh language."

== Awards ==
- 2014 Guardians of Small Business award. Presented by NFIB.

Roach received the Key Award from the WA Coalition for Open Government.

== Personal life and education ==
Roach received a bachelor's degree in history from Brigham Young University in 1970, and received a teaching certificate the next year.

Roach and her husband, Jim, have been married for over 30 years. They have five grown children, one of whom (Dan Roach) chaired the Pierce County Council while Pam was also a member.

Roach is a member of the Church of Jesus Christ of Latter-day Saints.

Washington State Senate
Preceded by Tim Sheldon	President pro tempore of the Washington Senate; 2015–2017	Succeeded by Tim Sheldon
