= Washington's 13th legislative district =

American legislative district

Coordinates: 47°10′N 119°20′W

Washington's 13th legislative district map after 2024 court-ordered redistricting

Washington's 13th legislative district is one of forty-nine districts in Washington state for representation in the state legislature.

The district includes all of Kittitas County, most of Grant County, and parts of Adams and Douglas County.

This rural district is represented by state senator Judy Warnick and state representatives Tom Dent (position 1) and Alex Ybarra (position 2), all Republicans.

The district boundaries were adjusted in 2024 following a court-ordered redistricting of the neighboring 15th LD, which was found to violate Latino voting rights.

== See also ==
- Washington Redistricting Commission
- Washington State Legislature
- Washington State Senate
- Washington House of Representatives
