= Amanda McKinney =

American politician (born 1978)

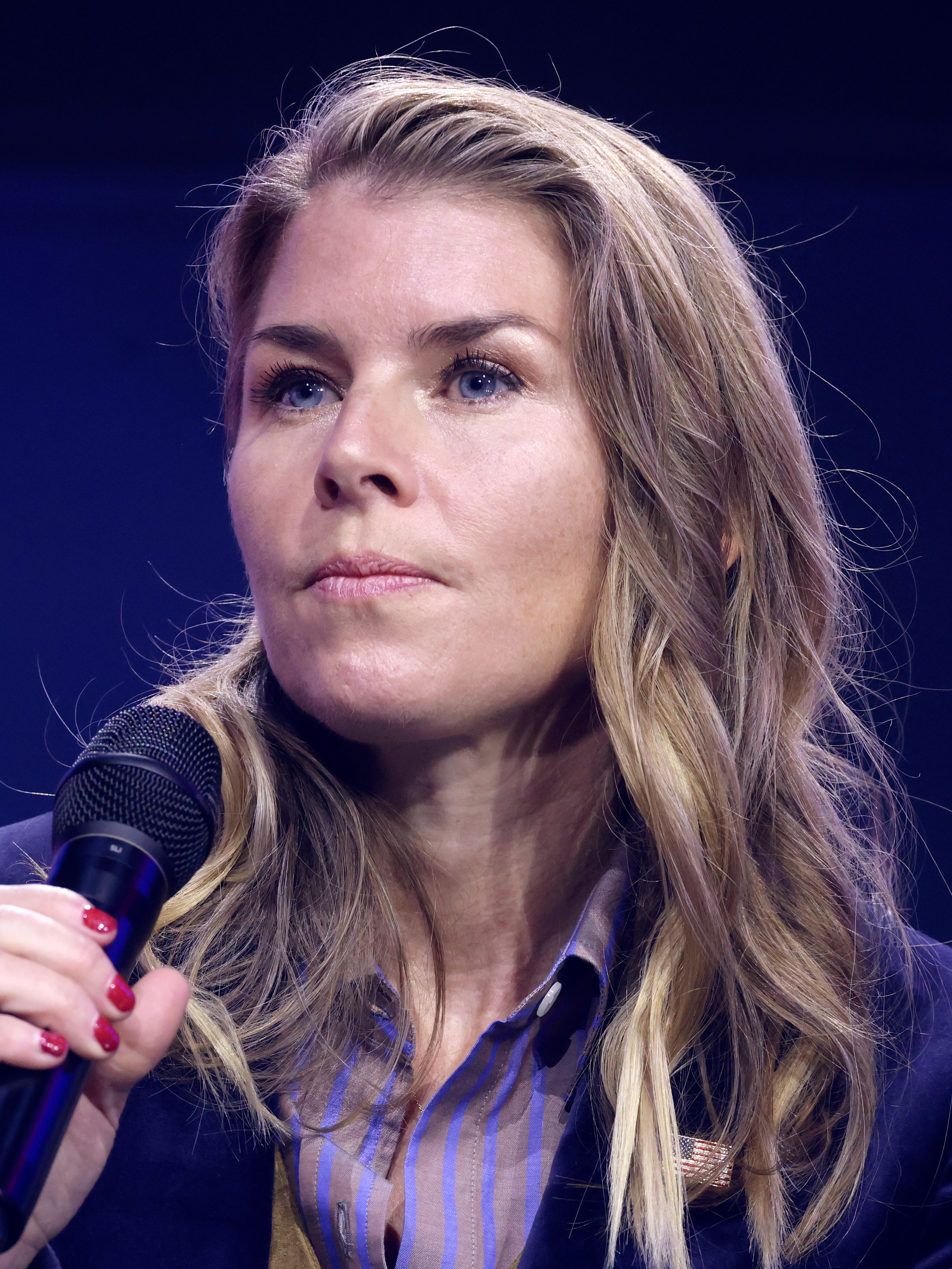
- McKinney in 2025

Member-elect of the U.S. House of Representatives from Washington's 4th district
- Assuming office January 3, 2027
- Succeeding: Dan Newhouse

Member of the Yakima County Commission from the 1st district
- Incumbent
- Assumed office November 25, 2020
- Preceded by: Vicki Baker

Personal details
- Born: Amanda Maureen McCabe; March 26, 1978 (age 48) Coos Bay, Oregon, U.S.
- Party: Republican
- Spouse: David McKinney
- Children: 2
- Education: Central Washington University (BA)

Amanda Maureen McKinney (née McCabe; born March 26, 1978) is an American politician from Washington. A Republican, she is the member-elect to the United States House of Representatives for Washington's 4th congressional district.

== Early life and career ==
McKinney's father was a trooper for the Oregon State Police. She graduated from Central Washington University. She is a licensed mortgage broker.

In 2020, McKinney was elected to the county commission for Yakima County, defeating incumbent and fellow Republican Vicki Baker. She had previously been nominated as an interim candidate following the resignation of Commissioner Mike Leita, though Baker would eventually be chosen to fill the vacancy. McKinney was sworn in in November 2020.

McKinney was reelected in 2022 against Democrat Angie Girard.

== U.S. House of Representatives ==
McKinney is running for the U.S. House of Representatives seat for Washington's 4th congressional district in the 2026 elections. Incumbent Republican Dan Newhouse declined to seek a seventh term, leaving an open primary for his successor. McKinney received the endorsements of President Donald Trump and Speaker of the House Mike Johnson. She placed first in the nonpartisan jungle primary, defeating Republicans Jerrod Sessler and Matt Boehnke.

McKinney faced Democrat John Duresky in the general election. She won with 54% of the vote.

== Personal life ==
McKinney lives in the city of Yakima, Washington with her husband David McKinney. They have two children.

== Electoral history ==
2020 Yakima County Commission District 1 election
Primary election
Party	Candidate	Votes	%
Republican	Amanda McKinney	11,195	47.4
Republican	Vicki Baker (incumbent)	8,203	34.7
No party preference	Cindy O'Halloran	4,089	17.3
Write-in		142	0.6
Total votes		23,629	100.0
General election
Republican	Amanda McKinney	46,517	55.3
Republican	Vicki Baker (incumbent)	36,216	43.0
Write-in		1,408	1.7
Total votes		84,141	100.0

2022 Yakima County Commission District 1 election
Primary election
Party	Candidate	Votes	%
Republican	Amanda McKinney (incumbent)	15,569	82.5
Write-in		3,308	17.5
Total votes		18,877	100.0
General election
Republican	Amanda McKinney (incumbent)	46,517	69.2
Democratic	Angie Girard	10,665	30.6
Write-in		98	0.3
Total votes		34,909	100.0

2026 Washington's 4th district congressional election
Party	Candidate	Votes	%
Republican	Amanda McKinney	49,652	34.8
Democratic	John Duresky	42,681	29.9
Republican	Jerrod Sessler	20,808	14.6
Republican	Matt Boehnke	15,013	10.5
No party preference	Favian Valencia	5,776	4.0
No party preference	Jacek Kobiesa	2,214	1.6
Cascade	Devin Pooré	1,956	1.4
Republican	John Hughs	1,695	1.2
Republican	Elpidia Saavedra	1,393	1.0
No party preference	Zac Rossi	879	0.6
Republican	Ken Vaz	477	0.3
Write-in		117	0.1
Total votes		142,661	100.0

U.S. House of Representatives
Preceded by Dan Newhouse	Member of the U.S. House of Representatives from Washington's 4th congressional district Taking office 2027	Elect
