= Marie Gluesenkamp Perez =

American politician (born 1988)

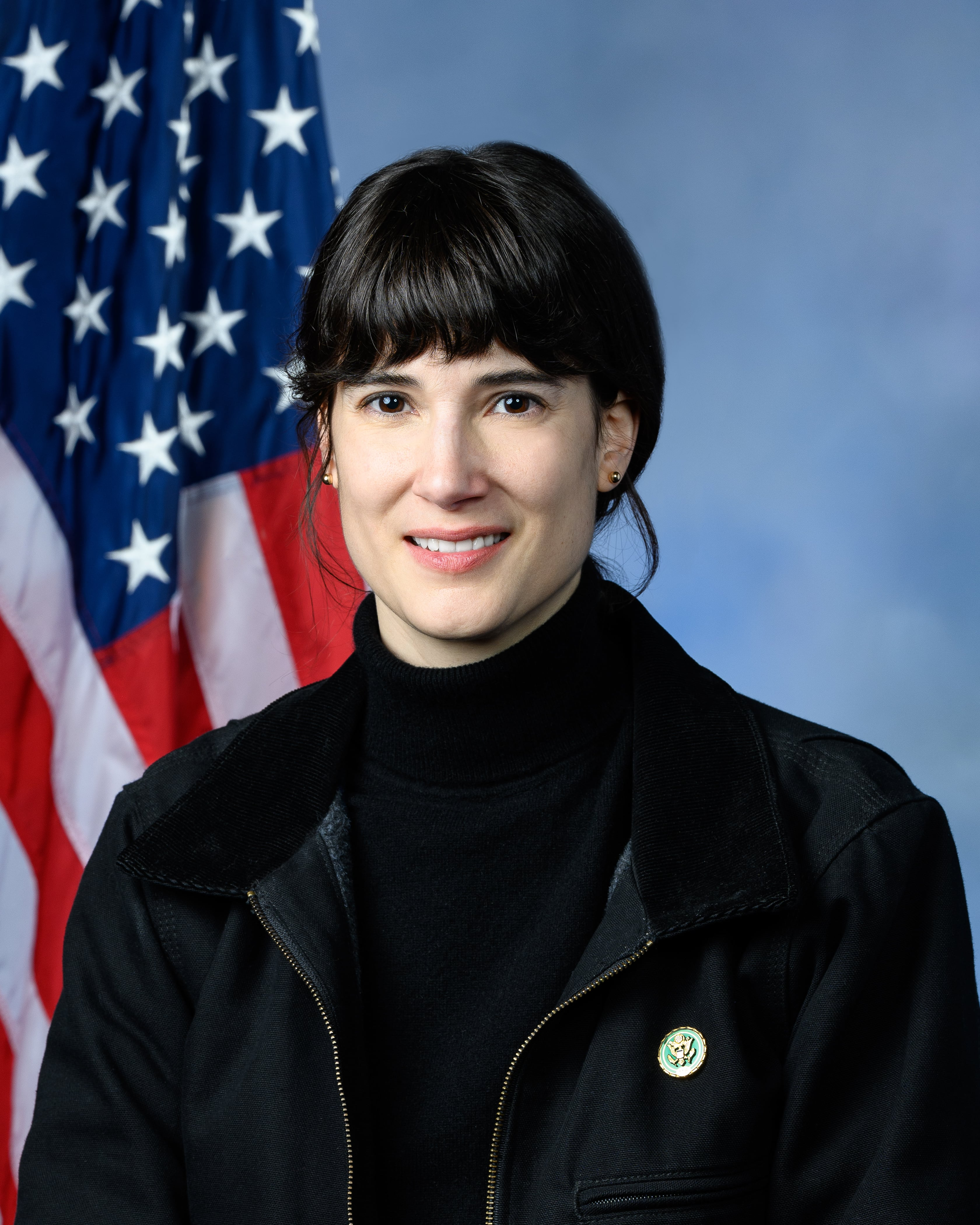
- Official portrait, 2023

Member of the U.S. House of Representatives from Washington's 3rd district
- Incumbent
- Assumed office January 3, 2023
- Preceded by: Jaime Herrera Beutler

Co-Chair of the Blue Dog Coalition for Administration
- Incumbent
- Assumed office January 3, 2025
- Preceded by: Jared Golden

Co-Chair of the Blue Dog Coalition for Communications
- In office May 24, 2023 – January 3, 2025
- Preceded by: Jared Golden (Administration and Communications)
- Succeeded by: Vicente Gonzalez

Personal details
- Born: Kristina Marie Perez; June 4, 1988 (age 38) Harris County, Texas, U.S.
- Party: Democratic
- Spouse: Dean Gluesenkamp (m. 2016)
- Children: 1
- Education: Warren Wilson College (attended); Reed College (BA)
- Website: House website Campaign website

Kristina Marie Gluesenkamp Perez (Note: Pronounced /ˈɡluːzənkæmp/) (née Perez; born June 4, 1988), also known as MGP, is an American politician serving as the United States representative for Washington's 3rd congressional district since 2023. A member of the Democratic Party, she is a co-chair of the Blue Dog Coalition. Gluesenkamp Perez was first elected to Congress in 2022, defeating Republican nominee Joe Kent in an upset, and was re-elected in 2024 in a rematch. She won a third term in the 2026 election, defeating Republican John Braun, the minority leader of the Washington State Senate.

Gluesenkamp Perez co-owned an auto repair shop with her husband before her election to Congress. In the House, she has been described as one of the most centrist Democrats in the chamber, breaking with her party on several issues. A member of the House Committee on Appropriations since 2025, Gluesenkamp Perez co-led the reauthorization of the Secure Rural Schools program, which was signed into law in December 2025. She has also emphasized her role in supporting federal right to repair legislation and securing federal funding to replace the aging Interstate Bridge among other issues.

== Early life and education ==
Kristina Marie Perez was born on June 4, 1988, in Harris County, Texas. Her father immigrated from Mexico, while her mother's family has roots in Washington. Her maternal side includes a long line of loggers, as well as a great-great-grandfather who worked as a quarry foreman in the state. Her grandfather was a carpenter in Bellingham.

Her parents met at Western Washington University and then moved to Texas. Her father was a pastor at an evangelical church, and her mother home-schooled the children during their early years. She was the youngest of four and was raised in Houston.

After high school, Perez initially attended Warren Wilson College and then transferred to Reed College in Portland, Oregon. She worked in a cafe and in production work to pay for tuition. She graduated from college in 2012 with a degree in economics.

== Early career ==
Perez met her future husband, Dean Gluesenkamp, in her senior year while managing the Reed Bike Co-op, where she worked as a bicycle mechanic. At the time, he was a mobile car mechanic. After she finished college, they opened an automobile repair shop and moved to rural Skamania County in Washington, where they built their own home.

Gluesenkamp Perez began her political career in 2016, when she ran for Skamania County commissioner but was unsuccessful, receiving 32.8% of the vote in the primary and 46.3% in the general election. She supported Bernie Sanders in the 2016 Democratic Party presidential primaries.

She ran again for office in 2018 for Skamania County Public Utility District commissioner but was again unsuccessful. That year, Gluesenkamp Perez began serving on the Underwood Conservation District board. From 2020 to 2022, she served on the Washington State Democratic Party executive committee.

== U.S. House of Representatives ==
=== Elections ===
==== 2022 ====
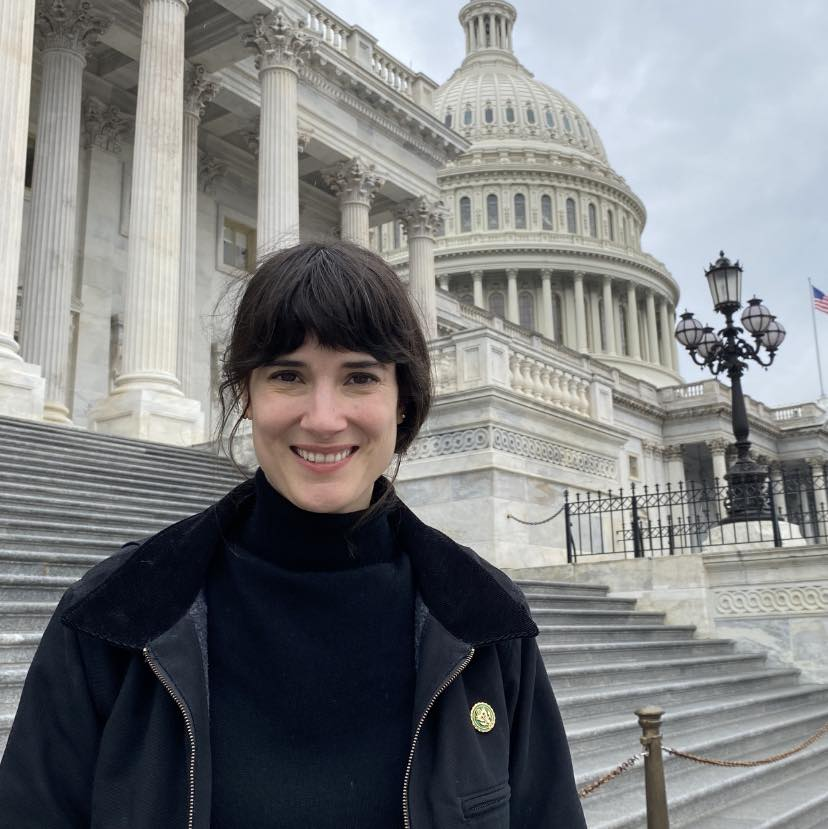
Gluesenkamp Perez outside the United States Capitol before her Congressional inauguration (2023)

In 2022, Gluesenkamp Perez ran for the U.S. House of Representatives to represent Washington's 3rd congressional district. She advanced from Washington's nonpartisan blanket primary in which candidates from all parties are listed on the same primary ballot, and the top two finishers, regardless of party, move on to the general election. Gluesenkamp Perez finished first in the primary with 31% of the vote, while Republican Joe Kent came in second, narrowly defeating the incumbent, Republican Jaime Herrera Beutler, by 0.5%. Another Republican, Heidi St. John, finished fourth with 16.0%, and the second Democratic candidate, Davy Ray, garnered 2.2%. Before the primary, Brent Hennrich, a Democrat who had led in two early polls, withdrew from the race and endorsed Gluesenkamp Perez.

The general election's rating varied from "Lean R", according to The Cook Political Report, to "Solid R" in FiveThirtyEight's House of Representatives forecast. FiveThirtyEight estimated that Gluesenkamp Perez had a 2% chance of winning the general election over Kent, and was expected to receive 43.6% of the popular vote. She led in one of two polls and was trailing in the other; both were within the margin of error. Her subsequent narrow victory received widespread national attention, with The Seattle Times calling it "the most stunning political upset in the country this year", and "a microcosm of the midterms". Kent conceded on December 21, following a recount.

==== 2024 ====
In 2024, Gluesenkamp Perez defeated Kent in a rematch, winning with 51.7% of the vote to Kent's 47.9%.

==== 2026 ====
Gluesenkamp Perez ran for a third term in the 2026 election. In the August 4 top-two primary, she and Republican John Braun, the minority leader of the Washington State Senate, advanced from a nine-candidate field to the general election, with each receiving about 39 percent of the vote.

Braun was endorsed by President Donald Trump in April 2026. The general election was expected to be among the most competitive House races of the cycle. The Cook Political Report rated the contest as a toss-up, while the University of Virginia Center for Politics rated it "leans Democratic." Gluesenkamp Perez retained her seat, earning 53.6% of the vote to Braun's 45.5%.

=== Tenure ===
Gluesenkamp Perez has been described as one of the most centrist Democrats in the House, and has frequently broken with the majority of her party on high-profile votes. She helped lead the House effort to reauthorize the Secure Rural Schools program, which funds schools and other services in timber-dependent counties and had lapsed at the end of 2023, contributing to school closures and layoffs in her district. After she sent repeated letters urging House leadership to take up the Senate-passed bill, the House voted 399-5 in December 2025 to reauthorize the program through fiscal year 2026 and to provide retroactive payments for fiscal years 2024 and 2025. President Donald Trump signed the reauthorization into law on December 18, 2025.

Following the May 2026 chemical tank collapse at the Nippon Dynawave paper mill in Longview, which killed 11 workers and was the deadliest industrial accident in Washington state history, Gluesenkamp Perez called on the mill's owners to provide a written guarantee that employees would continue receiving pay and benefits during the investigation.

=== Committee assignments ===
Current

- Committee on Appropriations
  - Subcommittee on Agriculture, Rural Development, Food and Drug Administration, and Related Agencies
  - Subcommittee on Financial Services and General Government

Past

- Committee on Agriculture (118th Congress)
  - Subcommittee on Commodity Markets, Digital Assets, and Rural Development
  - Subcommittee on Forestry
- Committee on Small Business (118th Congress)
  - Subcommittee on Oversight, Investigations and Regulations
  - Subcommittee on Rural Development, Energy, and Supply Chains (Ranking Member)

=== Caucus memberships ===
- Blue Dog Coalition (co-chair)
- Congressional Equality Caucus
- Problem Solvers Caucus
- Congressional Hispanic Caucus
- Congressional Ukraine Caucus

== Political positions ==
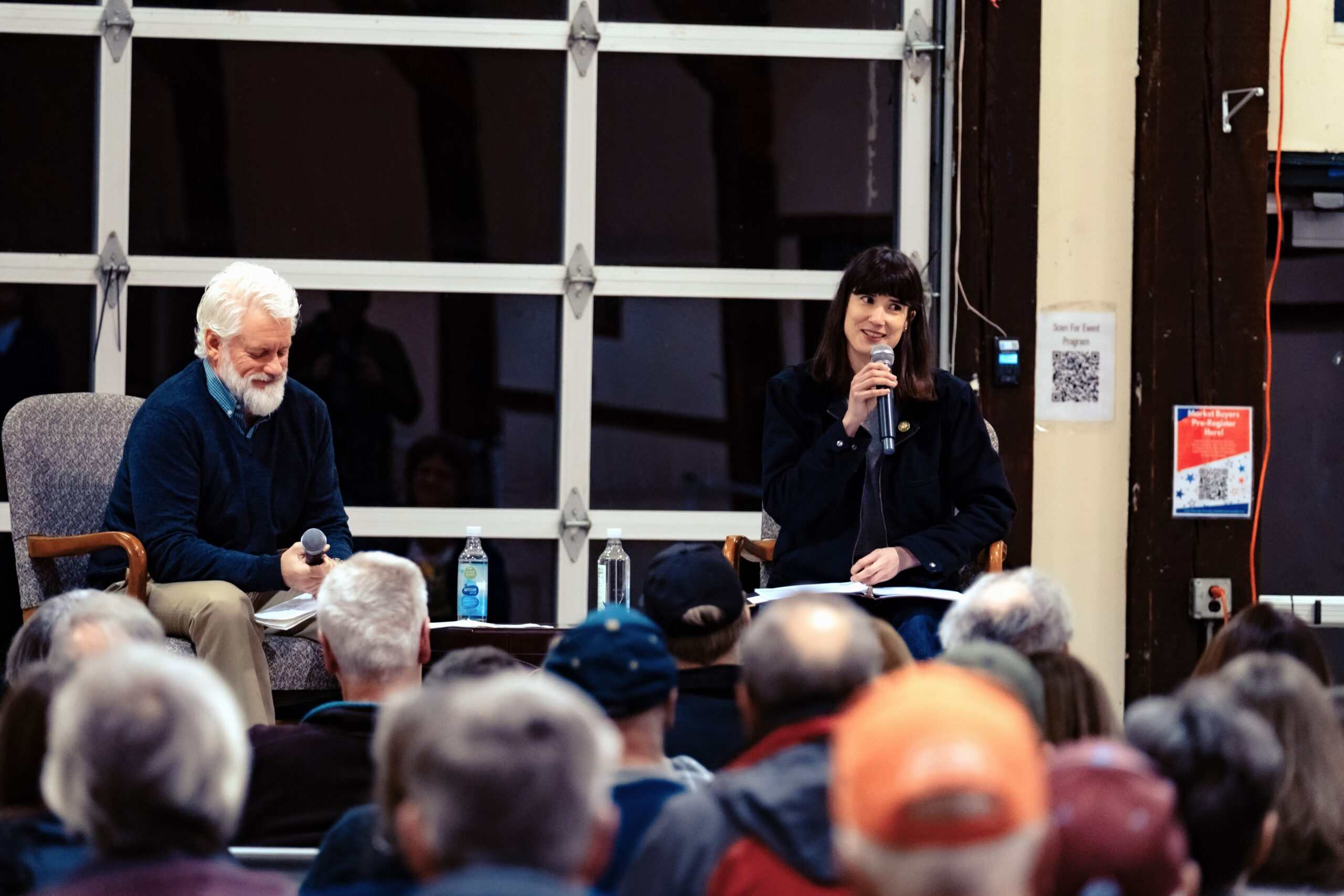
Gluesenkamp Perez holds a town hall in Stevenson (2024).

Gluesenkamp Perez campaigned as a moderate Democrat, supporting both abortion rights and Second Amendment rights. She emphasized her focus on small businesses, job training, local issues such as the timber industry, and expressed opposition to political extremism. Following her election, she became co-chair of the Blue Dog Coalition and joined the bipartisan Problem Solvers Caucus. Her record has been criticized by pro-choice activists and student debt activists.

=== Economics ===
Gluesenkamp Perez blames inflation on companies outsourcing jobs, and states that is the top issue affecting voters in her district. She has called for both increased usage of the Strategic Petroleum Reserve in the short term and a long-term increase in the number of jobs available in green industries.

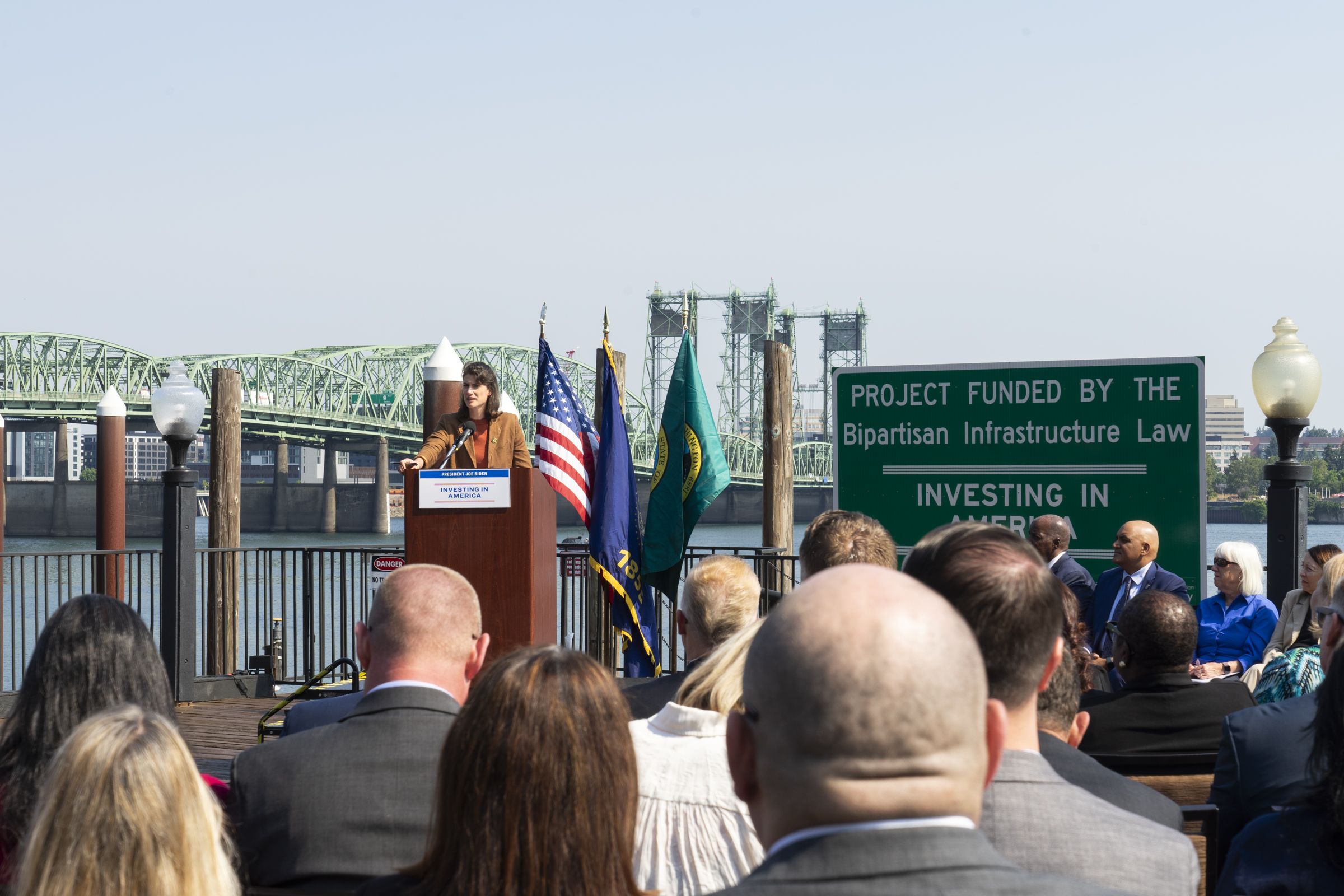
Gluesenkamp Perez speaking about the I-5 Bridge replacement project after helping secure $2.1 billion of funding

She voted against a student debt relief plan proposed by the White House in 2023. She was one of only two House Democrats to do so, along with Jared Golden of Maine. She stated that she would only support student debt forgiveness if matched dollar for dollar with investments in career and technical education.

Gluesenkamp Perez has emphasized her role in securing $2.1 billion in federal funding to rebuild the Interstate Bridge, which carries Interstate 5 across the Columbia River. Citing the economic losses experienced in her district from landslides, she co-sponsored the renewal of the National Landslide Preparedness Act in 2024.

=== Foreign policy ===
In February 2024, Gluesenkamp Perez co-sponsored the Defending Borders, Defending Democracies Act, which proposed $66.32 billion in defense funding, including approximately $47.7 billion for Ukraine, as well as funding for Israel and Taiwan.

In an October 2024 debate, Gluesenkamp Perez stated that she did not support any limits or conditions attached to US support for Israel.

In July 2026, Gluesenkamp Perez was one of just six Democrats to vote with Republicans to pass the 2027 National Defense Authorization Act, following an unsuccessful attempt, led by Ro Khanna and Thomas Massie, to remove the United States-Israel Defense Technology Cooperation Initiative from the bill. The Initiative, which expands U.S.-Israel military technology cooperation and integration, was described in a letter to Congress by 56 American civil rights and advocacy groups, including Amnesty International USA and the National Lawyers Guild, as "exceptionally dangerous".

In September 2026, Gluesenkamp Perez voted for the Protect Economic and Academic Freedom Act, an anti-BDS bill which would cut off federal funding for universities that participate in boycotts of Israel, including boycotts of illegal Israeli settlements, and requires schools to prove that students and faculty are not “reasonably obstructed” from participating in academic exchange programs with Israel.

=== Government reform ===
In June 2025, Gluesenkamp Perez introduced an amendment to a federal spending bill have the Office of Congressional Conduct develop a standard that the Ethics Committee could use to evaluate complaints lodged against lawmakers accused of suffering from cognitive impairment. The bill was unanimously voted down; she stated that she would continue to advocate for the policy.

Gluesenkamp Perez worked with Rep. Zach Nunn to proposed legislation that would ban congressional stock trading in 2025. In July 2026, she was one of 13 Democrats who voted for a Republican-led bill barring members of Congress and their families from purchasing individual stocks while in office.

==== Voting rights and electoral reform ====
Gluesenkamp Perez believes that vote by mail is safe and has refuted unsubstantiated claims of widespread fraud among mail-in ballots. In July 2024, she was one of only five out of 198 Democrats who voted with the Republican majority to pass the SAVE Act, which would require those registering to vote to provide documentary proof of United States citizenship. Again on April 10th, 2025, Gluesenkamp Perez was one of only four Democrats who joined all of the Republicans in the House in voting in favor of the SAVE Act on its second time through the House of Representatives.

In 2024, Gluesenkamp Perez, along with Jared Golden, proposed a bipartisan committee to consider electoral reforms, such as multi-member districts with proportional representation, increasing the number of members in the House of Representatives and establishing independent redistricting commissions.

=== Abortion ===
Gluesenkamp Perez supports abortion access, citing her personal experience having a dilation and curettage procedure after a miscarriage. KGW described her support for abortion rights as "a tenet of her campaign".

=== Military and veterans ===
In July 2023, Gluesenkamp Perez voted to pass the annual National Defense Authorization Act that included provisions to bar Pentagon spending for abortion and transgender surgeries. She defended her vote by saying the Senate would "clean up" the bill. In early 2024, Gluesenkamp Perez introduced the Rural Veterans Transportation to Care Act that would expand transportation to veterans attempting to access medical care. In July, after a letter she had sent earlier received no response, she hand delivered a petition to the head of the U.S. Department of Veterans Affairs (VA) requesting the reopening of a VA clinic in Lewis County. The prior clinic was closed in 2021 and replaced with a limited mobile care unit, requiring approximately 3,000 veterans in the county to travel out of the area to Olympia, Washington.

=== Immigration ===
Gluesenkamp Perez supports the reinstatement of Title 42 expulsions and the Remain in Mexico policy to curtail illegal immigration. In July 2024, she cast one of five Democratic votes to condemn the Biden administration's handling of the Mexico-United States border.

In January 2025, Gluesenkamp Perez was one of 48 Democrats to vote for the Laken Riley Act, which requires U.S. Immigration and Customs Enforcement to detain illegal immigrants charged with theft. She later became one of 46 House Democrats who joined all Republicans to vote for a Senate-amended version of the bill.

On January 22, 2026, she was one of seven Democrats who voted to pass HR 7147 funding bill for the United States Department of Homeland Security, including funding for Immigration and Customs Enforcement (ICE). The vote came amid Democratic criticism of ICE operations in Minneapolis following the shooting death of Renée Good and later exacerbated by the death of Alex Pretti in January 2026. Gluesenkamp Perez defended her vote, citing the bill's importance for the Coast Guard and FEMA in her district. She criticized both "overly aggressive tactics" by federal law enforcement and "indiscriminate, overly aggressive slogans like 'Defund ICE'" from her own party.

Following the fatal shooting of Alex Pretti by a Border Patrol agent on January 24, Gluesenkamp Perez called for DHS Secretary Kristi Noem to step down, describing the shooting as "un-American."

=== Technology ===
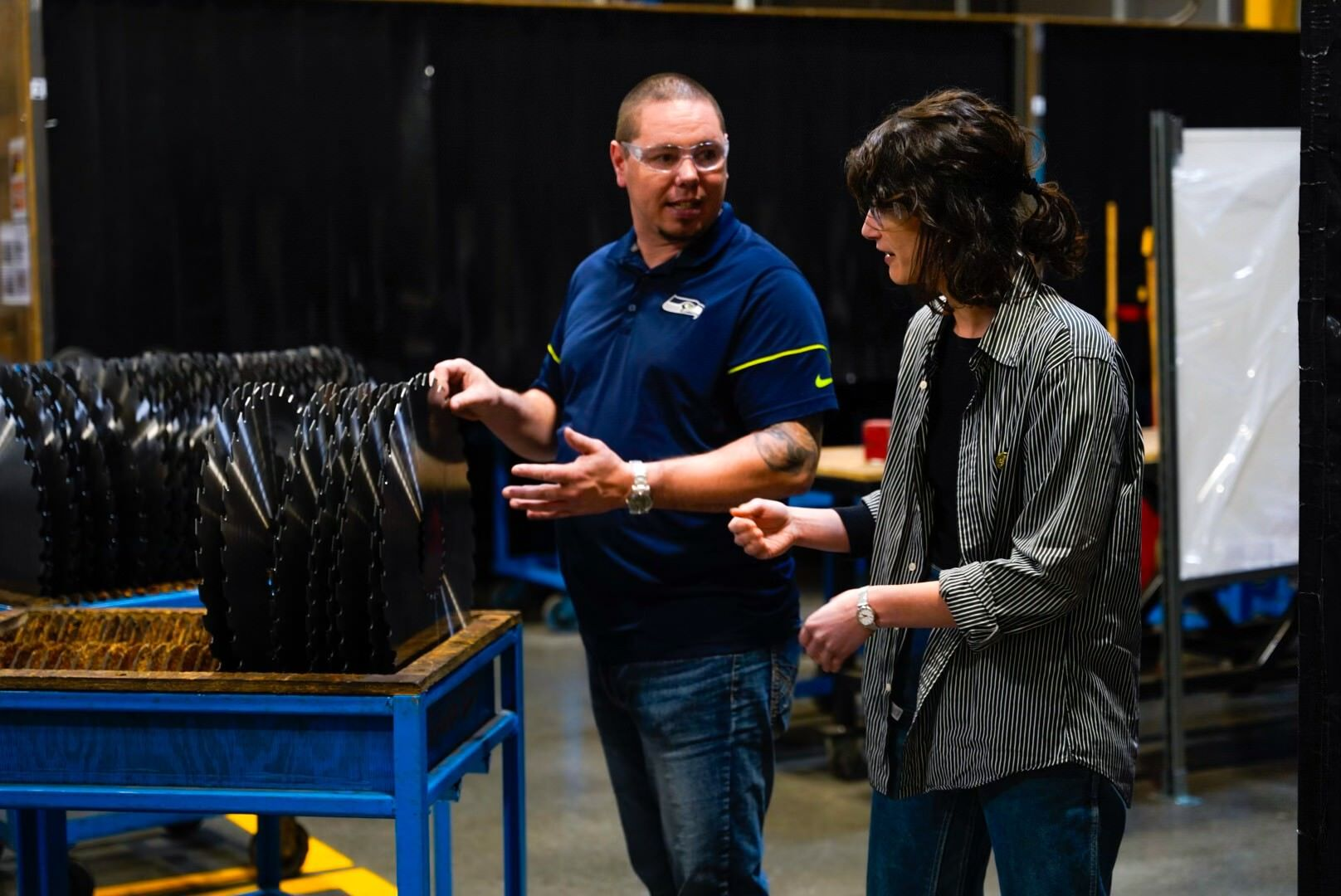
Gluesenkamp Perez visits Burton Mill Solutions.

In May 2023, Gluesenkamp Perez helped introduce the REPAIR Act and the SMART Act, two bipartisan right-to-repair bills that seek to require auto manufacturers to share parts, tools, and data needed for repairs at lower costs.

In January 2026, Gluesenkamp Perez was one of four Democrats who voted to block funding for federally driven "kill switch" vehicle technology, which could monitor drivers and intervene in vehicle operation.

=== Other ===
In 2025, Gluesenkamp Perez was among 10 Democrats who joined House Republicans in voting to censure Al Green for disrupting the 2025 Donald Trump speech to a joint session of Congress. In September 2026, she voted for a resolution which denounced socialism and the Democratic Socialists of America, and called for the passage of the SAVE America Act. Gluesenkamp Perez and Jared Golden were the only House Democrats who voted for the measure and fellow Democrats in the House, including Minority Leader Hakeem Jeffries and Minority Whip Katherine Clark, expressed surprise and disappointment about their vote.

Gluesenkamp Perez opposes a ban on assault weapons but supports raising the age required to purchase an assault weapon from 18 to 21.

In 2026, Gluesenkamp Perez was one of eight Democrats to join Republicans in passing the Stopping Indoctrination and Protecting Kids Act, which mandated that transgender youth be outed to their parents by school professionals, and which would bar schools from teaching about any concept related to transgender topics.

== Personal life ==
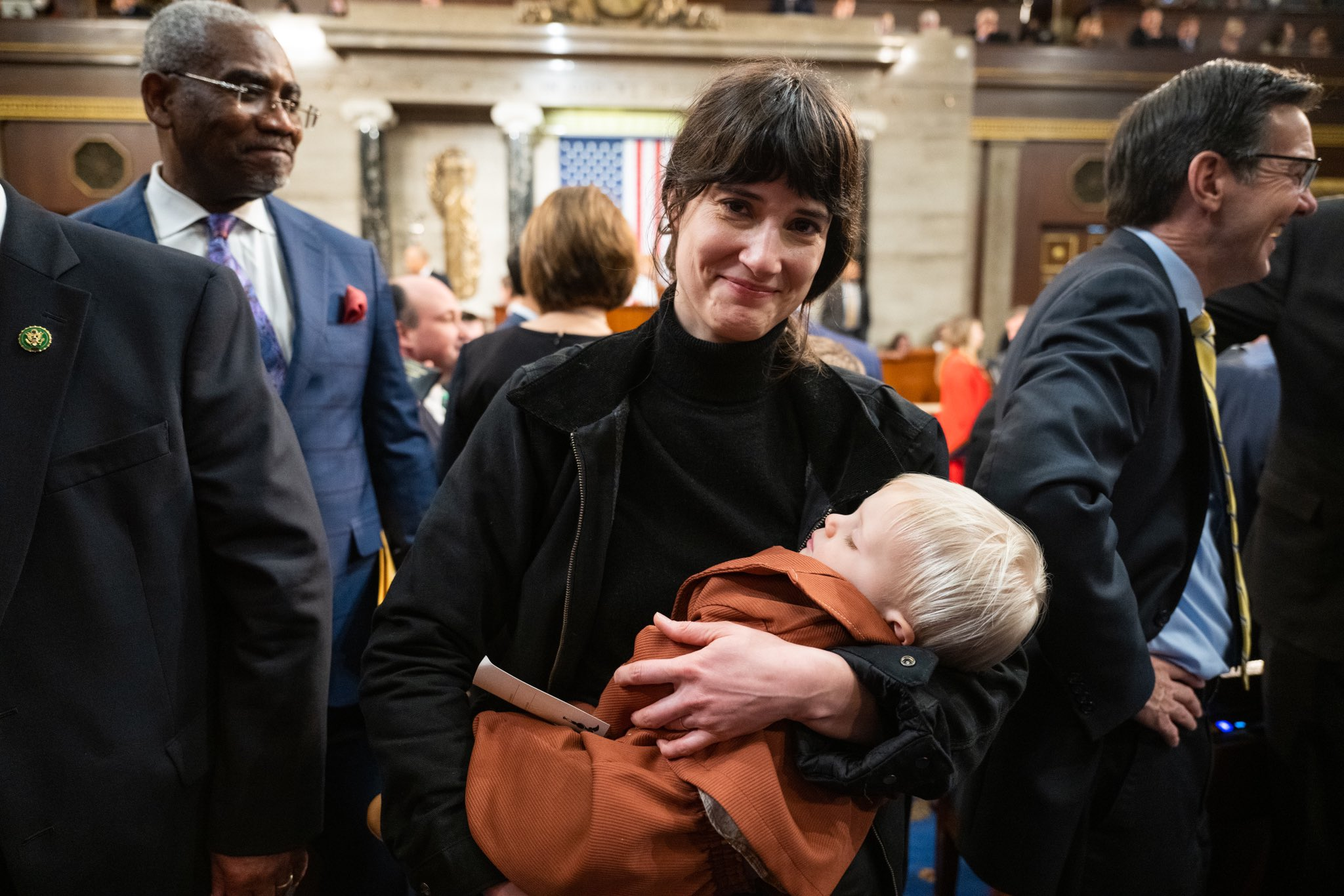
Gluesenkamp Perez with her son on the House floor

Gluesenkamp Perez lives near Stevenson, Washington, in Skamania County. She is married to Dean Gluesenkamp, and has one child. They also have a dog named Uma Furman. She is a nondenominational Christian.

Before joining Congress, she and her husband co-owned Dean's Car Care, an auto repair shop in Portland, Oregon. Her husband, the company's namesake, now manages it while she serves in Washington, D.C.

Gluesenkamp Perez was featured on The New York Times Style Magazine list of the 93 Most Stylish People of 2022.

== Electoral history ==
US House election, 2022: Washington District 3
Primary election
Party	Candidate	Votes	%
Democratic	Marie Gluesenkamp Perez	68,190	31.01
Republican	Joe Kent	50,097	22.78
Republican	Jaime Herrera Beutler (incumbent)	49,001	22.28
Republican	Heidi St. John	35,219	16.01
Republican	Vicki Kraft	7,033	3.20
Democratic	Davy Ray	4,870	2.21
No party preference	Chris Byrd	3,817	1.74
Republican	Leslie French	1,100	0.50
American Solidarity	Oliver Black	456	0.21
Write-in		142	0.06
Total votes		219,925	100
General election
Democratic	Marie Gluesenkamp Perez	160,314	50.14
Republican	Joe Kent	157,685	49.31
Write-in		1,760	0.55
Total votes		319,759	100
Democratic gain from Republican			

US House election, 2024: Washington District 3
Primary election
Party	Candidate	Votes	%
Democratic	Marie Gluesenkamp Perez (incumbent)	97,274	45.86
Republican	Joe Kent	83,389	39.31
Republican	Leslie Lewallen	25,868	12.19
No party preference	John Saulie-Rohman	5,406	2.55
Write-in		186	0.09
Total votes		212,123	100
General election
Democratic	Marie Gluesenkamp Perez (incumbent)	215,177	51.74
Republican	Joe Kent	199,054	47.86
Write-in		1,673	0.40
Total votes		415,904	100
Democratic hold			

US House election, 2026: Washington District 3
Primary election
Party	Candidate	Votes	%
Republican	John Braun	85,064	39.66
Democratic	Marie Gluesenkamp Perez (incumbent)	78,025	36.38
Democratic	Brent Hennrich	35,820	16.70
Republican	John Roco	4,102	1.91
No party preference	John Saulie-Rohman	3,549	1.657
Republican	Lawrence Kellogg	2,727	1.27
Democratic	Troy Rasband	2,058	0.96
Democratic	Austin Braswell	1,656	0.77
Cascade	Antony Barran	1,345	0.63
Write-in		145	0.07
Total votes		214,491	100
General election
Democratic	Marie Gluesenkamp Perez (incumbent)	186,903	53.62
Republican	John Braun	158,478	45.46
Write-in		3,216	0.92
Total votes		348,597	100
Democratic hold			

== See also ==
- List of Hispanic and Latino Americans in the United States Congress
- Women in the United States House of Representatives

== Notes ==
U.S. House of Representatives
Preceded by Jaime Herrera Beutler	Member of the U.S. House of Representatives from Washington's 3rd congressional district 2023–present	Incumbent
Party political offices
Preceded by Jared Golden as Chair of the Blue Dog Coalition for Administration and Communications	Chair of the Blue Dog Coalition for Communications; 2023–2025; Served alongside: Jared Golden (Administration), Mary Peltola (Policy)	Succeeded by Vicente Gonzalez
Preceded by Jared Golden	Chair of the Blue Dog Coalition for Administration; 2025–present Served alongside: Vicente Gonzalez (Communications), Lou Correa (Policy)	Incumbent
U.S. order of precedence (ceremonial)
Preceded by Robert Garcia	United States representatives by seniority 311th	Succeeded by Dan Goldman
