= 2026 United States House of Representatives elections in Washington =

- November 3, 2026

All 10 Washington seats to the United States House of Representatives
	Majority party	Minority party
Party	Democratic	Republican
Last election	8	2
Seats won	8	2
Seat change	Steady	Steady

Democratic:
50–60%
60–70%
70–80%
80–90%
Republican:
50–60%
60–70%
70–80%

The 2026 United States House of Representatives elections in Washington were held on November 3, 2026, to elect the ten U.S. representatives from the state of Washington, one from each of the state's ten congressional districts. The elections coincided with the other elections to the House of Representatives, elections to the United States Senate, and various state and local elections. Primary elections took place on August 4, 2026.

== District 1 ==
2026 Washington's 1st congressional district election
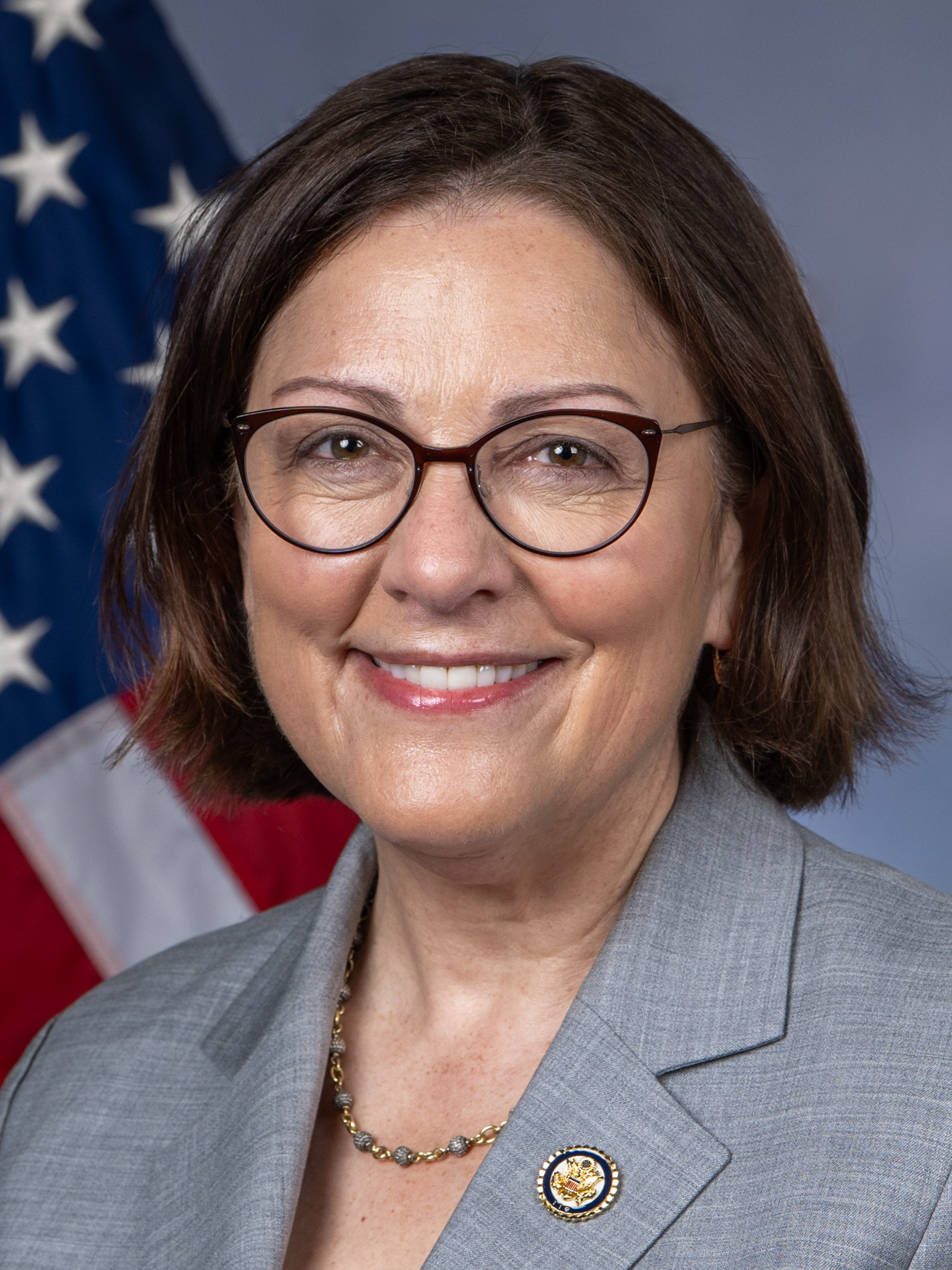

Nominee	Suzan DelBene	Mary Silva
Party	Democratic	Republican
- DelBene: 60–70% 70–80%
Incumbent U.S. Representative
Suzan DelBene
Democratic

The 1st district is based in the northern Seattle metropolitan area, including Kirkland, Redmond, and parts of Bellevue, Marysville, and Arlington. The incumbent is Democrat Suzan DelBene, who was re-elected with 63.0% of the vote in 2024.

=== Candidates ===
==== Advanced to general ====
- Suzan DelBene (Democratic), incumbent U.S. representative
- Mary Silva (Republican), candidate for this district in 2024

==== Eliminated in primary ====
- James Etzkorn (no party preference), engineer
- Hunter Gordon (Democratic), home care aide
- Catherine Hildebrand (Democratic), small business owner
- Benjamin Kincaid (Democratic), author
- Bryce Nickel (Democratic), candidate for state representative in 2024

=== Endorsements ===
Suzan DelBene (D)

Labor unions

- Washington State Labor Council

Organizations

- AIPAC
- Democratic Majority for Israel
- Giffords
- J Street
- Jewish Democratic Council of America
- Joint Action Committee for Political Affairs
- League of Conservation Voters Action Fund
- National Women's Political Caucus
- Planned Parenthood Action Fund
- Reproductive Freedom for All

Newspapers

- The Stranger
Hunter Gordon (D)

Organizations

- CAIR Action
- Progressive Victory
- Track AIPAC

=== Fundraising ===
Campaign finance reports as of March 31, 2026
Candidate	Raised	Spent	Cash on hand
Suzan DelBene (D)	$2,738,775	$2,427,787	$1,374,708
Hunter Gordon (D)	$68,971	$51,291	$17,680
James Etzkorn (NPP)	$2,656	$754	$1,901
Mary Silva (R)	$93	$339	$10
Source: Federal Election Commission

=== Results ===
Results by county DelBene: 40–50% 60–70%

Blanket primary results
Party	Candidate	Votes	%
Democratic	Suzan DelBene (incumbent)	85,156	53.0
Republican	Mary Silva	42,088	26.2
No party preference	James Etzkorn	12,023	7.5
Democratic	Hunter Gordon	10,014	6.2
Democratic	Bryce Nickel	3,929	2.4
Democratic	Benjamin Kincaid	3,580	2.2
Democratic	Catherine Hildebrand	3,562	2.2
Write-in		221	0.1
Total votes		160,573	100.0

=== General election ===
==== Predictions ====
Source	Ranking	As of
Decision Desk HQ	Safe D	July 14, 2026
The Cook Political Report	Solid D	February 6, 2025
Inside Elections	Solid D	March 7, 2025
Sabato's Crystal Ball	Safe D	August 14, 2025
Split Ticket	Safe D	July 28, 2026

==== Post-primary endorsements ====
Suzan DelBene (D)

Newspapers

- The Seattle Times

==== Results ====
2026 Washington's 1st congressional district election
Party	Candidate	Votes	%
Democratic	Suzan DelBene (incumbent)		
Republican	Mary Silva		
Total votes			100.0

== District 2 ==
2026 Washington's 2nd congressional district election
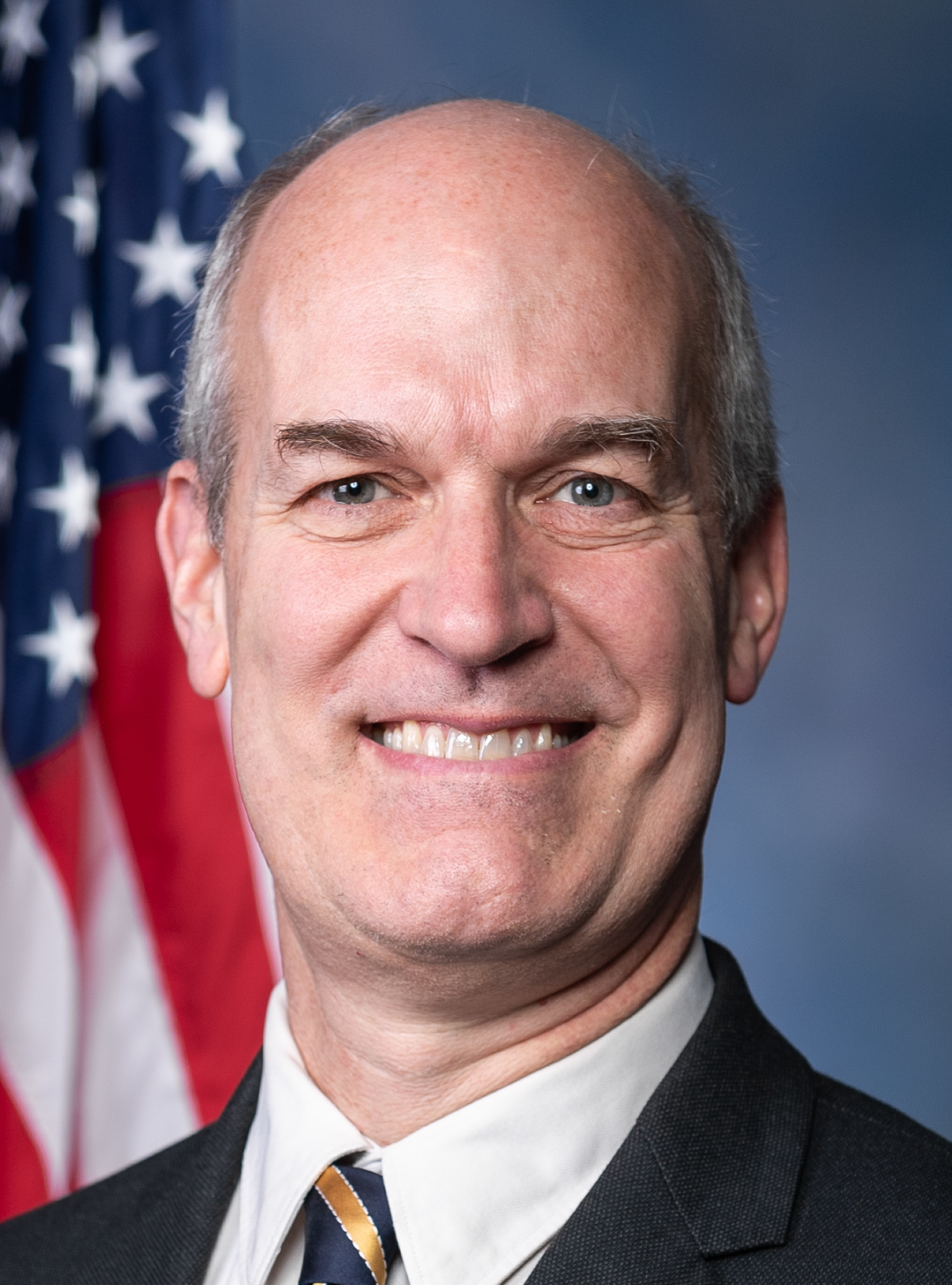

Nominee	Rick Larsen	Edwin H. Feller
Party	Democratic	Republican
- Larsen: 60–70% 70–80%
Incumbent U.S. Representative
Rick Larsen
Democratic

The 2nd district stretches from the Canada–United States border to the northern Seattle metropolitan area, including Bellingham and Everett. The incumbent is Democrat Rick Larsen, who was re-elected with 63.8% of the vote in 2024.

=== Candidates ===
==== Advanced to general ====
- Edwin H. Feller (Republican), retired businessman
- Rick Larsen (Democratic), incumbent U.S. representative

==== Eliminated in primary ====
- Devin Hermanson (Democratic), candidate for this district in 2024
- Tomas Scheel (Democratic), software developer

==== Withdrawn ====
- Raymond Pelletti (Republican), candidate for state representative in 2024

=== Endorsements ===
Rick Larsen (D)

Labor unions

- IUOE Local 302
- Washington State Labor Council

Organizations

- Moms Demand Action
- Planned Parenthood Action Fund
- Sierra Club
- U.S. Chamber of Commerce

Political parties

- Skagit County Democratic Party (co-endorsement with Scheel)
Tomas Scheel (D)

Organizations

- CAIR Action
- Progressive Victory
- The Urbanist
- Whatcom County Democratic Socialists of America

Political parties

- San Juan County Democratic Party
- Skagit County Democratic Party (co-endorsement with Larsen)

=== Fundraising ===
Campaign finance reports as of March 31, 2026
Candidate	Raised	Spent	Cash on hand
Rick Larsen (D)	$1,602,896	$1,101,991	$748,341
Source: Federal Election Commission

=== Results ===
Results by county Larsen: 30–40% 40–50% 50–60%

Blanket primary results
Party	Candidate	Votes	%
Democratic	Rick Larsen (incumbent)	88,708	42.3
Republican	Edwin H. Feller	68,713	32.8
Democratic	Tomas Scheel	29,133	13.9
Democratic	Devin Hermanson	22,775	10.9
Write-in		181	0.1
Total votes		209,510	100.0

=== General election ===
==== Predictions ====
Source	Ranking	As of
Decision Desk HQ	Safe D	July 14, 2026
The Cook Political Report	Solid D	February 6, 2025
Inside Elections	Solid D	March 7, 2025
Sabato's Crystal Ball	Safe D	August 14, 2025
Split Ticket	Safe D	July 28, 2026

==== Results ====
2026 Washington's 2nd congressional district election
Party	Candidate	Votes	%
Democratic	Rick Larsen (incumbent)		
Republican	Edwin H. Feller		
Total votes			100.0

== District 3 ==
2026 Washington's 3rd congressional district election
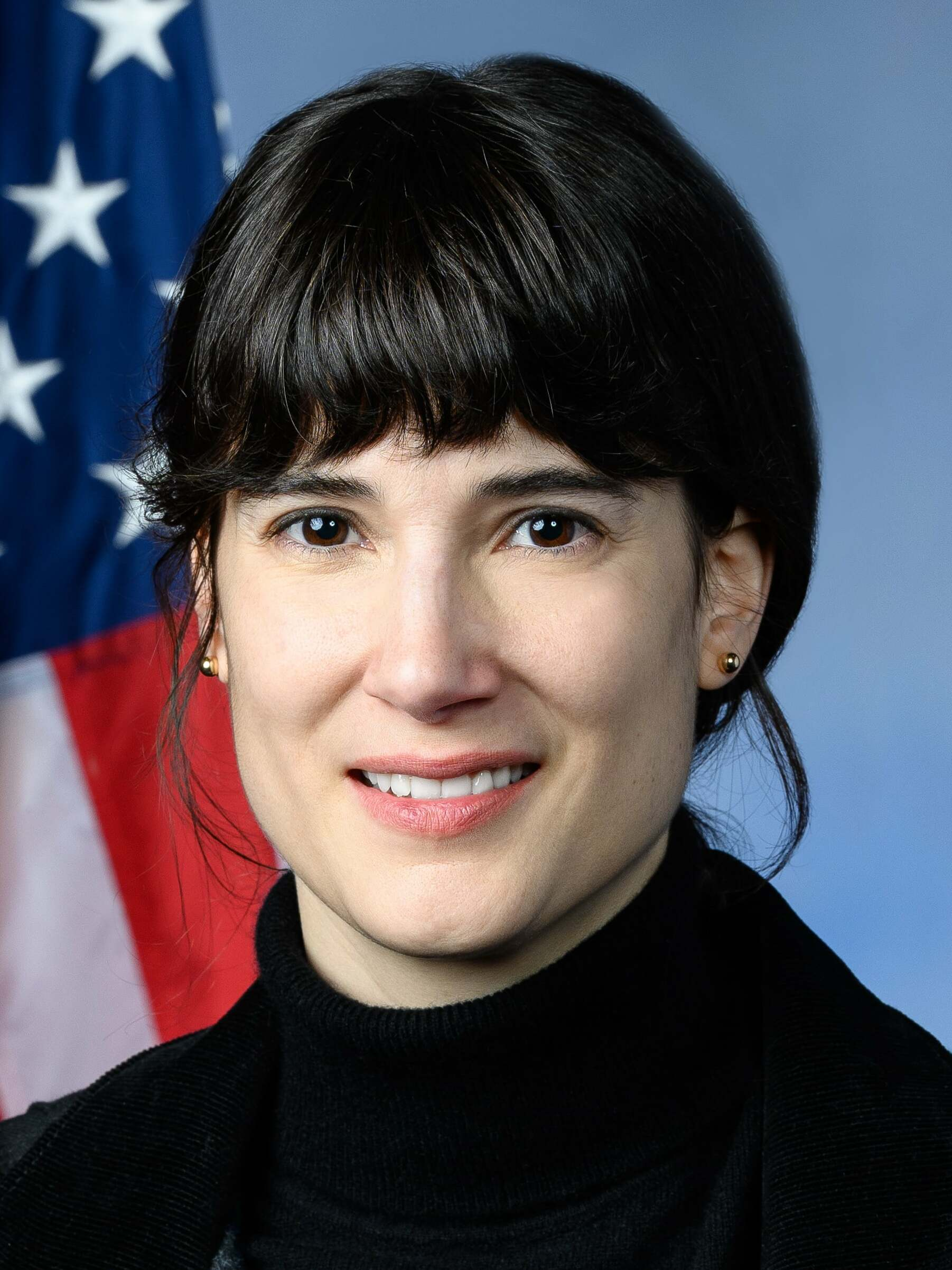

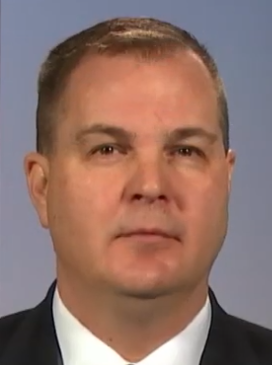
Nominee	Marie Gluesenkamp Perez	John Braun
Party	Democratic	Republican
Popular vote	189,105	160,174
Percentage	53.6%	45.4%
- Gluesenkamp Perez: 50–60% Braun: 50–60% 60–70%
U.S. Representative before election
Marie Gluesenkamp Perez
Democratic
Elected U.S. Representative
Marie Gluesenkamp Perez
Democratic

The 3rd district is based in Vancouver and encompasses Washington's portion of the Portland, Oregon metropolitan area. District 3 is the most competitive congressional district in the state, with a Cook PVI of R+2. The incumbent, Democrat Marie Gluesenkamp Perez, was re-elected with 51.7% of the vote in 2024. In that year, she was one of only 13 Democrats to win a congressional district in a district also won by Donald Trump.

Gluesenkamp Perez has received criticism from her left for her support of the SAVE Act, her vote to censure fellow Democratic Representative Al Green, and other positions. In May 2025, Brent Hennrich, a stay-at-home father and candidate for this district in 2022, announced his intention to run against Perez, citing her support for the SAVE Act and the Laken Riley Act.

On January 22, 2026, Representative Gluesenkamp Perez was one of seven Democrats that voted to fund the Department of Homeland Security, which includes Immigration and Customs Enforcement.

=== Candidates ===
==== Advanced to general ====
- John Braun (Republican), minority leader of the Washington Senate (2020–present) from the 20th district (2017–present)
- Marie Gluesenkamp Perez (Democratic), incumbent U.S. representative

==== Eliminated in primary ====
- Antony Barran (Cascade), oyster farm owner
- Austin Braswell (Democratic)
- Brent Hennrich (Democratic), former project manager, stay-at-home parent and candidate for this district in 2022
- Lawrence Kellogg (Republican), retired pilot
- John Saulie-Rohman (no party preference), candidate for this district in 2024
- Troy Rasband (Democratic)
- John P. Roco (Republican)

==== Declined ====
- Joe Kent (Republican), former director of the National Counterterrorism Center (2025–2026) and runner-up for this district in 2022 and 2024

=== Endorsements ===
Antony Barran (C)

Individuals

- Krist Novoselic, former bass player for Nirvana

Political parties

- Cascade Party
John Braun (R)

Executive branch officials

- Donald Trump, president of the United States (2017–2021, 2025–present)

U.S. representatives

- Michael Baumgartner, WA-05 (2025–present)
- Newt Gingrich, former speaker of the House of Representatives (1995–1999) from GA-06 (1979–1999)
- Richard Hudson, NC-09 (2013–present)
- Mike Johnson, speaker of the House (2023–present) from LA-04 (2017–present)
- Steve Scalise, House majority leader (2023–present) from LA-01 (2008–present)

Statewide officials

- Sam Reed, former Washington secretary of state (2001–2013)

State senators

- Tim Sheldon, former LD-35 (1997–2023) (Democratic)
- Lynda Wilson, former LD-17 (2017–2025)

Organizations

- GOPAC
- Mainstream Republicans of Washington
- National Republican Congressional Committee
- NRA Political Victory Fund

Party chapters

- Clark County Republican Party
- Lewis County Republican Party
- Skamania County Republican Party

Newspapers

- The Chronicle
- The Columbian
Marie Gluesenkamp Perez (D)

Labor unions

- IUOE Local 302

Organizations

- AIPAC
- Democratic Majority for Israel
- Elect Democratic Women
- EMILY's List
- End Citizens United
- International Franchise Association
- Jewish Democratic Council of America
- Joint Action Committee for Political Affairs
- Latino Victory
- National Women's Political Caucus
- WelcomePAC
Brent Hennrich (D)

Statewide officials

- Dave Upthegrove, Washington state commissioner of public lands (2025–present)

State representatives

- Brian Blake, former LD-19 (2002–2021)
- JD Rossetti, former LD-19 (2015–2016)

Political parties

- 20th Legislative District Democratic Party

Organizations

- CAIR Action
- Indivisible Lewis County
- Indivisible Pacific County
- Progressive Victory
- Track AIPAC
- Washington Stonewall Democrats
Declined to endorse

Party chapters

- Clark County Democratic Party

Labor unions

- Washington State Labor Council

=== Fundraising ===
Campaign finance reports as of June 30, 2026
Candidate	Raised	Spent	Cash on hand
Antony Barran (C)	$44,506	$42,387	$2,119
John Braun (R)	$1,980,862	$530,448	$1,450,415
Marie Gluesenkamp Perez (D)	$6,183,270	$2,304,467	$3,905,263
Brent Hennrich (D)	$243,675	$226,950	$17,940
Source: Federal Election Commission

=== Polling ===
Poll source	Date(s) administered	Sample size (Note: Key: A – all adults RV – registered voters LV – likely voters V – unclear)	Margin of error	John Braun (R)	Marie Gluesenkamp Perez (D)	Brent Hennrich (D)	Other	Undecided
Emerson College (Note: Poll commissioned by the Northwest Progressive Institute)	July 8–10 2026	500 (LV)	± 4.4%	26%	25%	11%	11% (Note: John Roco (R) with 5%; Lawrence Kellogg (R) with 2%; Antony Barran (C), Austin Braswell (D), Troy Rasband (D), and John Saulie-Rohman (NPP) with 1%)	26%
Gravis Marketing (Note: Poll commissioned by Hennrich's campaign)	November 10–12, 2025	752 (LV)	± 3.6%	33%	24%	14%	–	28%

=== Results ===
County results Braun: 40–50%; 50–60%; Gluesenkamp Perez: 30–40%; 40–50%

Precinct results Braun: 30–40%; 40–50%; 50–60%; 60–70%; 70–80%; 90–100%; Gluesenkamp Perez: 30–40%; 40–50%; 50–60%; 60–70%; 90–100%; Hennrich: 30–40%; 40–50%

Blanket primary results
Party	Candidate	Votes	%
Republican	John Braun	85,064	39.7
Democratic	Marie Gluesenkamp Perez (incumbent)	78,025	36.4
Democratic	Brent Hennrich	35,820	16.7
Republican	John P. Roco	4,102	1.9
No party preference	John Saulie-Rohman	3,549	1.7
Republican	Lawrence Kellogg	2,727	1.3
Democratic	Troy Rasband	2,058	1.0
Democratic	Austin Braswell	1,656	0.8
Cascade	Antony Barran	1,345	0.6
Write-in		145	0.1
Total votes		214,491	100.0

=== General election ===
==== Predictions ====
Source	Ranking	As of
Decision Desk HQ	Likely D	October 30, 2026
The Cook Political Report	Lean D	October 30, 2026
Inside Elections	Tossup	October 29, 2026
Sabato's Crystal Ball	Lean D	October 27, 2026
Split Ticket	Likely D	July 28, 2026

==== Fundraising ====
Campaign finance reports as of October 14, 2026
Candidate	Raised	Spent	Cash on hand
Marie Gluesenkamp Perez (D)	$9,472,267	$9,264,207	$234,520
John Braun (R)	$3,311,756	$2,639,837	$671,919
Source: Federal Election Commission

==== Polling ====
Poll source	Date(s) administered	Sample size	Margin of error	Marie Gluesenkamp Perez (D)	John Braun (R)	Undecided
Change Research (D)	October 19–21, 2026	551 (LV)	± 4.3%	45%	44%	11%
DHM Research (Note: Poll commissioned by Oregon Public Broadcasting)	July 8–10 2026	543 (LV)	± 4.0%	44%	46%	11%
DHM Research	July 8–10 2026	543 (LV)	± 4.0%	47%	48% (Note: With voters who lean towards a given candidate)	15%
DHM Research	July 8–10 2026	600 (RV)	± 4.2%	44%	43%	13%
DHM Research	July 8–10 2026	600 (RV)	± 4.2%	47%	45%	8%
Emerson College	July 8–10 2026	500 (LV)	± 4.4%	42%	43%	16%
co/efficient (R) (Note: Poll commissioned by the NRCC)	April 25–29, 2026	982 (LV)	± 3.1%	34%	41%	26%
Voter Sciences (R) (Note: Poll commissioned by the Washington State Republican Party)	August 2025	– (RV)	–	41%	48%	11%

Hypothetical polling

Marie Glueneskamp Perez vs. Heidi St. John

Poll source	Date(s) administered	Sample size	Margin of error	Marie Gluesenkamp Perez (D)	Heidi St. John (R)	Undecided
Voter Sciences (R)	August 2025	– (RV)	–	43%	46%	11%

Marie Glueneskamp Perez vs. Jim Walsh

Poll source	Date(s) administered	Sample size	Margin of error	Marie Gluesenkamp Perez (D)	Jim Walsh (R)	Undecided
Voter Sciences (R)	August 2025	– (RV)	–	42%	48%	10%

Generic Democrat vs generic Republican

Poll source	Date(s) administered	Sample size	Margin of error	Generic Democrat	Generic Republican	Undecided
co/efficient (R)	April 25–29, 2026	842 (LV)	± 3.1%	45%	44%	11%

==== Results ====
2026 Washington's 3rd congressional district election
Party	Candidate	Votes	%
Democratic	Marie Gluesenkamp Perez (incumbent)		
Republican	John Braun		
Total votes			100.0

== District 4 ==
2026 Washington's 4th congressional district election
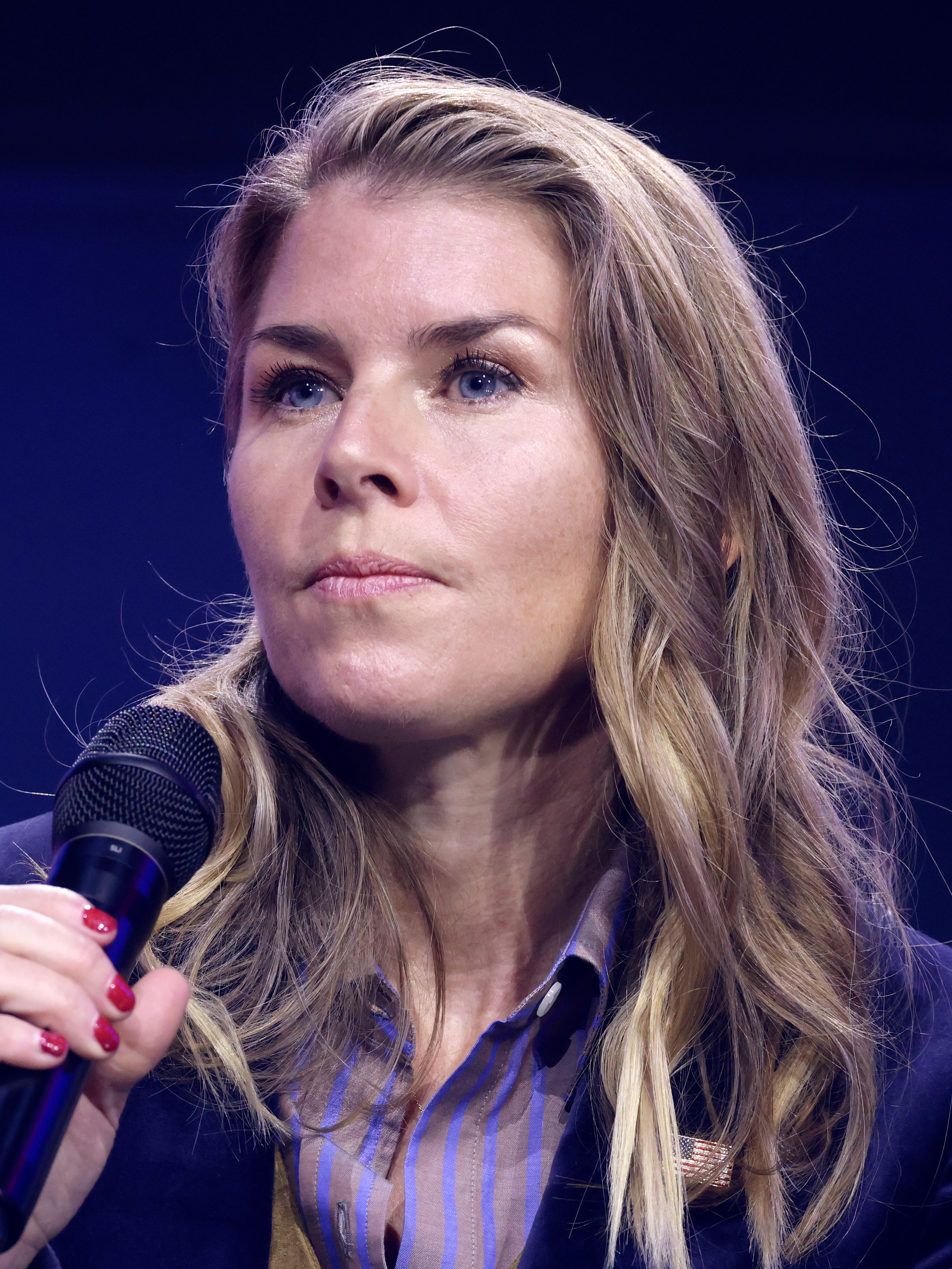

Nominee	Amanda McKinney	John Duresky
Party	Republican	Democratic
Popular vote	128,950	109,679
Percentage	53.9%	45.9%
- McKinney: 40–50% 50–60% 60–70% Duresky: 50–60%
U.S. Representative before election
Dan Newhouse
Republican
Elected U.S. Representative
Amanda McKinney
Republican

The 4th district encompasses much of central Washington, including Yakima and the Tri-Cities of Kennewick, Pasco, and Richland. The incumbent is Republican Dan Newhouse, who was re-elected with 52.0% of the vote against another Republican in 2024.

Incumbent Congressman Dan Newhouse opted to retire instead of running for another term. He initially supported Republican Yakima County Commissioner Amanda McKinney before switching his support to Republican State Senator Matt Boehnke after McKinney declared her opposition to Newhouse at a TPUSA rally, despite supporting Newhouse in previous bids.

Republican Amanda McKinney and Democrat John Duresky advanced through the August 4 primary with 34.8% and 29.9% of the vote respectively. The 3rd and 4th place finishers, Boehnke and Republican Jerrod Sessler, have refused to endorse McKinney. Traditionally conservative leaning papers such as the Yakima Herald-Republic and the Tri-City Herald have endorsed McKinney's Democratic opponent. Congressman Dan Newhouse has declined to endorse either candidate.

=== Candidates ===
==== Advanced to general ====
- John Duresky (Democratic), combat veteran, retired Air Force major and project manager
- Amanda McKinney (Republican), Yakima County commissioner (2020–present)

==== Eliminated in primary ====
- Matt Boehnke (Republican), state senator from the 8th district (2023–present)
- John Hughs (Republican), certified nursing assistant
- Jack Kobiesa (no party preference), mechanical engineer and Republican candidate for this district in 2022
- Devin Pooré (Cascade), software engineer
- Zac Rossi (no party preference)
- Elpidia Saavedra (Republican), mayor of Toppenish (2022–present)
- Jerrod Sessler (Republican), home repair business founder, former NASCAR driver, and runner-up for this district in 2024 and candidate in 2022. Jan 6th rioter.
- Favian Valencia (Independent), civil rights lawyer and business owner
- Ken Vaz (Republican), software engineer

==== Withdrawn ====
- Carmen Black (no party preference), educator

==== Declined ====
- Dan Newhouse (Republican), incumbent U.S. representative

=== Endorsements ===
Matt Boehnke (R)

U.S. representatives

- Newt Gingrich, former speaker of the House of Representatives (1995–1999) from GA-06 (1979–1999)
- Doc Hastings, former WA-04 (1995–2015)

State legislators

- Mark Schoesler, former Senate majority leader (2014–2017) from SD-09 (2005–present)
- 6 other state senators (Note: Perry Dozier, SD-16 (2021–present); Keith Goehner, SD-12 (2025–present); Jeff Holy, SD-06 (2019–present); Drew MacEwen, SD-35 (2023–present); Nikki Torres, SD-15 (2023–present); Jeff Wilson, SD-19 (2021–present))
- 10 state representatives (Note: Andrew Barkis, HD-02 (2016–present); Stephanie Barnard, HD-08 (2023–present); April Connors, HD-08 (2023–present); Tom Dent, HD-13 (2015–present); Carolyn Eslick, HD-39 (2017–present); Mark Klicker, HD-16 (2021–present); Sam Low, HD-39 (2023–present); Skyler Rude, HD-16 (2021–present); Joe Schmick, HD-09 (2007–present); Suzanne Schmidt, HD-04 (2023–present))

Labor unions

- IUOE Local 302
- UA Plumbers and Pipefitters Local 598

Organizations

- GOPAC
- Lampson International

Political parties

- Franklin County Republican Party
John Duresky (D)

Labor unions

- Washington State Labor Council

Organizations

- CAIR Action
- Track AIPAC
- Washington Education Assocation

Political parties

- Benton County Democratic Party
- Franklin County Democratic Party
- Grant County Democratic Party
- Klickitat County Democratic Party
- Okanogan County Democratic Party
- Yakima County Democratic Party

Newspapers

- Tri-City Herald
- Yakima Herald-Republic
Amanda McKinney (R)

Executive branch officials

- Donald Trump, president of the United States (2017–2021, 2025–present)

U.S. representatives

- Michael Baumgartner, WA-05 (2025–present)
- Mike Johnson, speaker of the House (2023–present) from LA-04 (2017–present)
- GT Thompson, PA-15 (2019–present)

Organizations

- NRA Political Victory Fund
- Turning Point Action
Devin Pooré (C)

Individuals

- Krist Novoselic, former bass player for Nirvana

Political parties

- Cascade Party of Washington
Jerrod Sessler (R)

Executive branch officials

- Michael Flynn, former national security advisor (2017)

Individuals

- Roger Stone, political consultant and lobbyist

Political parties

- Benton County Republican Party
- Douglas County Republican Party
Declined to endorse McKinney (post-primary)

U.S. representatives

- Dan Newhouse, incumbent representative for this district (2015–present) (Republican)

Individuals

- Jerrod Sessler, primary candidate for this district (Republican)

=== Fundraising ===
Campaign finance reports as of June 30, 2026
Candidate	Raised	Spent	Cash on hand
John Duresky (D)	$81,606	$24,522	$57,084
Amanda McKinney (R)	$928,595	$484,981	$443,613
Jerrod Sessler (R)	$402,499 (Note: $199,430 of this total was self-funded by Sessler.)	$351,126	$126,377
Matthew Boehnke (R)	$176,138	$111,689	$64,449
John Hughs (R)	$1,305	$1,205	$100
Source: Federal Election Commission

=== Polling ===
Poll source	Date(s) administered	Sample size	Margin of error	Matt Boehnke (R)	John Duresky (D)	Amanda McKinney (R)	Wesley Meier (R)	Devin Pooré (C)	Jerrod Sessler (R)	Other	Undecided
Fabrizio, Lee & Associates (R) (Note: Poll commissioned by an unnamed pro-McKinney group)	February 4–5, 2026	400 (LV)	± 4.9%	7%	25%	20%	1%	5%	14%	1%	27%

=== Debates ===
2026 Washington's 4th congressional district primary debates
No.	Date	Host	Moderator	Link	Republican	Republican	Republican	Republican	Republican	Republican	Democratic	Cascade	No party preference
Key: P Participant I Invited W Withdrawn A Absent N Not invited													
Key: P Participant I Invited W Withdrawn A Absent N Not invited					Boehnke	Hughs	McKinney	Saavedra	Sessler	Vaz	Duresky	Pooré	Kobiesa
1	April 19, 2026	Yakima County; Republican Party	Matt Brown	YouTube	P	N	P	N	P	N	N	N	P (Note: Intended to be a Republican-only candidate forum, Kobiesa attended for unknown reasons.)
2	May 29, 2026	Mainstream Republicans of Washington	Scott Greenstone	TVW	P	N	P	N	A	N	N	P	N
3	July 16, 2026	Yakima Republican; Women's Club	Patricia Byers	N/A	P	P	P	P	P	P	N	N	N

=== Results ===
Results by county McKinney: 30–40%; 40–50%; Duresky: 30–40%

Blanket primary results
Party	Candidate	Votes	%
Republican	Amanda McKinney	49,652	34.8
Democratic	John Duresky	42,681	29.9
Republican	Jerrod Sessler	20,808	14.6
Republican	Matt Boehnke	15,013	10.5
No party preference	Favian Valencia	5,776	4.0
No party preference	Jacek Kobiesa	2,214	1.6
Cascade	Devin Pooré	1,956	1.4
Republican	John Hughs	1,695	1.2
Republican	Elpidia Saavedra	1,393	1.0
No party preference	Zac Rossi	879	0.6
Republican	Ken Vaz	477	0.3
Write-in		117	0.1
Total votes		142,661	100.0

=== General election ===
==== Predictions ====
Source	Ranking	As of
Decision Desk HQ	Likely R	September 8, 2026
The Cook Political Report	Solid R	February 6, 2025
Inside Elections	Solid R	March 7, 2025
Sabato's Crystal Ball	Safe R	August 14, 2025
Split Ticket	Safe R	July 28, 2026

==== Results ====
2026 Washington's 4th congressional district election
Party	Candidate	Votes	%
Republican	Amanda McKinney		
Democratic	John Duresky		
Total votes			100.0

== District 5 ==
2026 Washington's 5th congressional district election
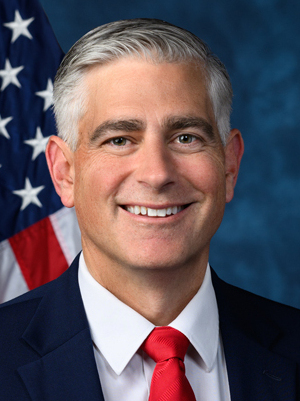

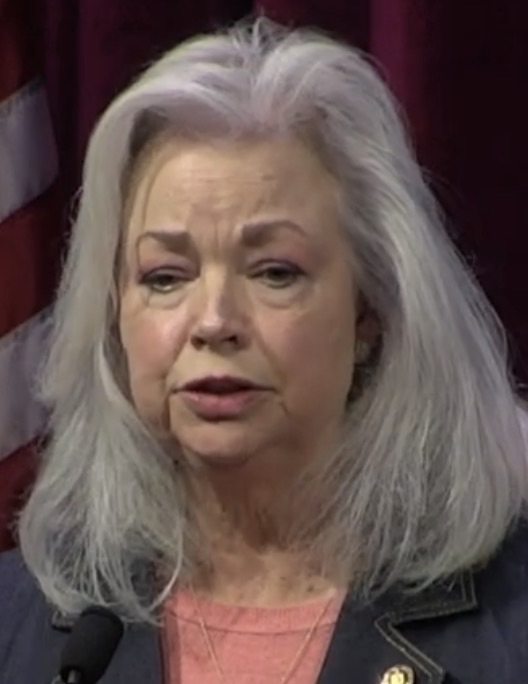
Nominee	Michael Baumgartner	Carmela Conroy
Party	Republican	Democratic
Popular vote	163,507	149,609
Percentage	52.0%	47.6%
- Baumgartner: 50–60% 60–70% 70–80% Conroy: 50–60%
U.S. Representative before election
Michael Baumgartner
Republican
Elected U.S. Representative
Michael Baumgartner
Republican

The 5th district encompasses much of eastern Washington, including Spokane, Pullman, and Walla Walla. The district has strongly favored Republicans, though Democrats were more competitive during the 2018 House elections, the first midterm elections of President Donald Trump's first term, when Democratic nominee Lisa Brown lost the district by 9.5 percentage points. The district is rated as "Safe R" by The Cook Political Report.

The 2026 House elections will coincide with the second midterm elections of Trump's presidency. The incumbent is Republican Michael Baumgartner, who was elected with 60.6% of the vote in 2024. He is running for re-election.

=== Candidates ===
==== Advanced to general ====
- Michael Baumgartner (Republican), incumbent U.S. representative
- Carmela Conroy (Democratic), former chair of the Spokane County Democratic Party and runner-up for this district in 2024

==== Eliminated in primary ====
- Andrew Bartleson (Independent), Washington State Department of Labor and Industries auditor
- Ann Marie Danimus (Independent), marketing firm owner and Democratic candidate for this district in 2022 and 2024
- Kevin Fagan (Democratic), sustainability consultant
- Richard Freudenberg (Democratic), former attorney
- Matthew Hayes (Independent), Air Force veteran and physician
- Bajun Mavalwalla (Democratic), retired Army intelligence officer
- Michael McGarr (Democratic), former copy editor
- Nate Powell (Independent Party of Washington), firefighter and marine veteran
- Kyle Usrey (Independent), former charter dean at Whitworth University
- David Womack (Democratic), former hospital CEO

==== Withdrawn ====
- Aaron Croft (Independent Party of Washington), Air Force veteran (running for state house)
- Mike Gahvarehchee (Democratic), real estate developer

=== Endorsements ===
Michael Baumgartner (R)

Executive branch officials

- Asif J. Chaudhry, former U.S. Ambassador to Moldova (2008–2011)
- Donald Trump, president of the United States (2017–2021, 2025–present)

U.S. representatives

- Jim Jordan, OH-04 (2007–present)
- Brad Knott, NC-13 (2025–present)
- Cathy McMorris Rodgers, former Washington's 5th congressional district (2005–2025)

Statewide officials

- Rob McKenna, former Washington Attorney General (2005–2013)
- Sam Reed, former Washington Secretary of State (2001-2013)

State legislators

- Mark Schoesler, former Senate majority leader (2014–2017) from SD-09 (2005–present)
- Dino Rossi, state senator from the 5th district (1997–2003, 2012, 2016–2017)
- Hunter Abell, state representative from the 7th district (2025–present)
- Andrew Engell, state representative from the 7th district (2025–present)
- Shelly Short, state senator from the 7th district (2017–present)

Local officials

- David Condon, former mayor of Spokane (2011–2019)
- Nadine Woodward, former mayor of Spokane (2019–2023)
- Ozzie Knezovich, former Spokane County Sheriff (2006–2022)

Individuals

- Tim Eyman, anti-tax activist
- Susan Hutchison, former chair of the Washington State Republican Party (2013–2018)
- Jack Thompson, former NFL player

Organizations

- American Hospital Association
- Associated Builders and Contractors
- Associated General Contractors of Washington
- Farm Credit Council
- International Franchise Association
- Mainstream Republicans of Washington
- National Association of Realtors
- National Federation of Independent Business
- National Rural Electric Cooperative Association
- NRA Political Victory Fund
- U.S. Chamber of Commerce
- U.S. Term Limits
- Washington Farm Bureau
- Washington State Young Republicans

Political parties

- Asotin County Republican Party
- Franklin County Republican Party
- Lincoln County Republican Party
- Pend Oreille County Republican Party
- Spokane County Republican Party
- Stevens County Republican Party
- Walla Walla County Republican Party
- Whitman County Republican Party

Tribes

- Colville Confederated Tribes
- Eastern Band of Cherokee Indians
- Muckleshoot Indian Tribe
- Puyallup Tribe of Indians
- Spokane Tribe of Indians
- Suquamish Indian Tribe
Carmela Conroy (D)

Organizations

- Center for Freethought Equality
- National Women's Political Caucus
Nate Powell (IPW)

Individuals

- Michael Novogratz, co-founder and CEO of Galaxy Digital LP
- Dan Osborn, independent candidate for U.S. Senate in Nebraska in 2024 and former president of Bakery, Confectionery, Tobacco Workers and Grain Millers' International Union
- Andrew Yang, entrepreneur, founder of Venture for America, Democratic candidate for president in 2020 and mayor of New York City in 2021 (Forward)

Labor unions

- International Association of Fire Fighters Local 27
- International Association of Fire Fighters Local 29
- International Association of Fire Fighters Local 31
- International Association of Fire Fighters Local 1488
- International Union of Operating Engineers Local 302
- IUOE Local 302
- OPEIU Local 8
- Sailors' Union of the Pacific
- SEIU Local 775
- Sheet Metal Workers' International Association Local 66
- United Association Local 598
- Washington State Labor Council, AFL-CIO

Organizations

- End Citizens United
- Fuse Washington
- League of Conservation Voters Action Fund
- Washington State Council of Fire Fighters

Political parties

- Forward Party
Kevin Fagan (D)

Organizations

- CAIR Action
- Progressive Victory
- Spokane County Young Democrats
- Young Democrats of Washington
Bajun Mavalwalla (D)

Labor unions

- International Brotherhood of Electrical Workers Local 77
Richard Freudenberg (D)

Political parties

- Spokane County Democratic Party
David Womack (D)

Political parties

- Walla Walla County Democratic Party

=== Fundraising ===
Italics indicate a withdrawn candidate.

Campaign finance reports as of July 15, 2026
Candidate	Raised	Spent	Cash on hand
Michael Baumgartner (R)	$1,738,226	$976,007	$953,783
Carmela Conroy (D)	$396,216 (Note: $9,940 of this total was self-funded by Conroy.)	$334,895	$74,462
Nate Powell (IPW)	$359,950 (Note: $12,086.89 of this total was self-funded by Powell.)	$249,189	$110,761
David Womack (D)	$131,462 (Note: $7,811 of this total was self-funded by Womack.)	$95,895	$35,567
Bajun Mavalwalla (D)	$128,134 (Note: $3,818 of this total was self-funded by Mavalwalla.)	$113,369	$14,765
Matthew Hayes (I)	$40,770	$4,265	$36,505
Richard Freudenberg (D)	$32,888 (Note: $26,944 of this total was self-funded by Freudenberg.)	$12,670	$20,217
Kyle Usrey (I)	$30,125 (Note: $30,000 of this total was self-funded by Usrey.)	$3,907	$26,218
Kevin Fagan (D)	$39,100	$25,937	$13,163
Ann Marie Danimus (I)	$16,430	$16,405	$47
Source: Federal Election Commission

=== Debates ===
2026 Washington's 5th congressional district primary debates
No.	Date	Host	Moderator	Link	Republican	Democratic	Democratic	Democratic	Democratic	Democratic	Democratic	Independent	Independent	Independent	IPW	Independent
Key: P Participant I Invited W Withdrawn A Absent N Not invited * Not declared																
Key: P Participant I Invited W Withdrawn A Absent N Not invited * Not declared					Baumgartner	Conroy	Mavalwalla	Womack	Fagan	Freudenberg	McGarr	Bartleson	Danimus	Hayes	Powell	Usrey
1	April 15, 2026	Walla Walla Democratic Party	Rodney Outlaw	YouTube	N	P	P	P	P	N	N	*	N	*	N	*
2	April 24, 2026	Eastern Washington University	Alesia Levchenko	YouTube	N	P	P	P	P	N	N	*	P	*	P	*
3	May 30, 2026	Spokane Indivisible; Showing Up for Racial Justice	Jeff Thomas, et al.	KSPS-TV (PBS)	N	P	P	P	P	N	N	*	P	*	P	*
4	May 31, 2026	Fairfield Community Center		YouTube	N	P	P	P	P	P	N	P	P	N	N	N
5	June 2, 2026	Asotin County Democratic Party		KFRP 90.3	N	P	P	P	P	P	P	P	P	P	N	N
6	July 5, 2026	The Spokesman-Review	Emry Dinman	YouTube	N	P	P	P	A	P	P	P	P	P	P	P
7	July 12, 2026	Spokane County Library; KVFS-LP	Bert Emerson	KVFS-LP	N	P	P	A	A	N	N	P	P	P	A	P
8	July 13, 2026	League of Women Voters Pullman	Deb Olson	YouTube	N	P	P	P	P	P	N	P	A	A	P	A
9	July 18, 2026	Stevens County Democratic Party	Lisa Wolfe	YouTube	N	P	P	P	P	N	N	N	N	N	N	N
10	July 19, 2026	Spokane County Democratic Party	Lili Navarrete	Spokane Democrats	N	P	P	P	P	A	A	P	P	P	P	P
11	July 30, 2026	KSPS-PBS	Erin Sellers	YouTube	N	P	P	P	P	N	N	P	P	P	W (Note: Powell originally accepted the invitation to attend, but pulled out last minute to go to a donor fundraiser. It was later revealed that the fundraiser had already ended by the time the event began, so it is unclear why Powell withdrew.)	P

=== Polling ===
Poll source	Date(s) administered	Sample size	Margin of error	Michael Baumgartner (R)	Carmela Conroy (D)	Ann Marie Danimus (I)	Kevin Fagan (D)	Anthony Jensen (R)	Bajun Mavalwalla (D)	Nate Powell (IPW)	Marcus Riccelli (D)	David Womack (D)	Other	Undecided
Change Research (D) (Note: Poll commissioned by Independent Candidates Action, which is affiliated with Powell's campaign.)	March 17–19, 2026	617 (LV)	± 4.2%	39%	9%	4%	3%	4%	2%	4%	5%	2%	2% (Note: "Would not vote" with 2%; Anthony Whisenhunt (D) with 0%)	25%

=== Results ===
Results by county Baumgartner: 40–50% 50–60% 60–70% 70–80%

Blanket primary results
Party	Candidate	Votes	%
Republican	Michael Baumgartner (incumbent)	96,791	47.4
Democratic	Carmela Conroy	38,487	18.8
Independent	Nate Powell	33,443	16.4
Democratic	Kevin Fagan	9,048	4.4
Democratic	David Womack	7,242	3.5
Democratic	Bajun Mavalwalla	6,482	3.2
Independent	Ann Marie Danimus	2,920	1.4
Democratic	Richard Freudenberg	2,866	1.4
Independent	Matthew Hayes	2,417	1.2
Independent	Kyle Usrey	2,274	1.1
Democratic	Michael McGarr	1,152	0.6
Independent	Andrew Bartleson	915	0.4
Write-in		172	0.1
Total votes		204,209	100.0

=== General election ===
==== Predictions ====
Source	Ranking	As of
Decision Desk HQ	Likely R	October 30, 2026
The Cook Political Report	Likely R	October 30, 2026
Inside Elections	Likely R	October 29, 2026
Sabato's Crystal Ball	Likely R	October 20, 2026
RealClearPolitics	Likely R	May 24, 2026
The Economist	Safe R	June 4, 2026
Split Ticket	Safe R	July 28, 2026
Fox News	Safe R	August 5, 2026

==== Polling ====
Poll source	Date(s) administered	Sample size	Margin of error	Michael Baumgartner (R)	Carmela Conroy (D)
Tavern Research (D) (Note: Poll commissioned by Working Class Heroes Fund PAC, which is affiliated with Nate Powell's campaign)	May 18–25, 2026	578 (LV)	± 5.6%	53%	47%

Hypothetical polling

Michael Baumgartner vs. Bajun Mavalwalla

Poll source	Date(s) administered	Sample size	Margin of error	Michael Baumgartner (R)	Bajun Mavalwalla (D)
Tavern Research (D)	May 18–25, 2026	578 (LV)	± 5.6%	54%	46%

Michael Baumgartner vs. Nate Powell

Poll source	Date(s) administered	Sample size	Margin of error	Michael Baumgartner (R)	Nate Powell (IPW)
Tavern Research (D)	May 18–25, 2026	578 (LV)	± 5.6%	47%	53%

Michael Baumgartner vs. David Womack

Poll source	Date(s) administered	Sample size	Margin of error	Michael Baumgartner (R)	David Womack (D)
Tavern Research (D)	May 18–25, 2026	578 (LV)	± 5.6%	54%	46%

Michael Baumgartner vs. generic Democrat

Poll source	Date(s) administered	Sample size	Margin of error	Michael Baumgartner (R)	Generic Democrat
Tavern Research (D)	May 18–25, 2026	578 (LV)	± 5.6%	53%	47%

==== Results ====
2026 Washington's 5th congressional district election
Party	Candidate	Votes	%
Republican	Michael Baumgartner (incumbent)		
Democratic	Carmela Conroy		
Total votes			100.0

== District 6 ==
2026 Washington's 6th congressional district election
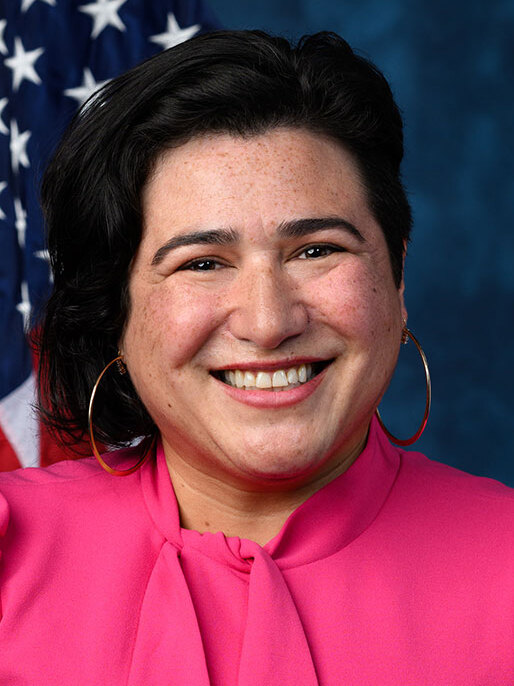

Nominee	Emily Randall	Teresa Fox
Party	Democratic	Republican
- Randall: 50–60% 60–70% 70–80%
Incumbent U.S. Representative
Emily Randall
Democratic

The 6th district encompasses the Olympic Peninsula, the Kitsap Peninsula, including the cities of Bremerton and Port Orchard, and the majority of Tacoma. The incumbent is Democrat Emily Randall, who was elected with 56.7% of the vote in 2024.

=== Candidates ===
==== Advanced to general ====
- Teresa Fox (Republican), occupational safety professional
- Emily Randall (Democratic), incumbent U.S. representative

==== Eliminated in primary ====
- Macy Jones (no party preference)
- Leon Lawson (Trump Republican), (Note: Not an actual political party. In Washington, independent candidates are allowed to choose a ballot label.) used car dealer and perennial candidate
- Brian P. O'Gorman (Independent)

=== Endorsements ===
Emily Randall (D)

Labor unions

- Washington State Labor Council

Organizations

- Center for Freethought Equality
- Giffords
- Human Rights Campaign
- J Street
- Jewish Democratic Council of America
- League of Conservation Voters Action Fund
- LGBTQ+ Victory Fund
- Planned Parenthood Action Fund
- Reproductive Freedom for All
Macy Jones (NPP)

Organizations

- CAIR Action

=== Fundraising ===
Campaign finance reports as of March 31, 2026
Candidate	Raised	Spent	Cash on hand
Emily Randall (D)	$948,185	$772,856	$203,199
Source: Federal Election Commission

=== Results ===
Results by county Randall: 40–50% 50–60% 60–70% 70–80%

Blanket primary results
Party	Candidate	Votes	%
Democratic	Emily Randall (incumbent)	132,805	58.8
Republican	Teresa Fox	57,700	25.5
Trump Republican	Leon Lawson	21,965	9.7
Independent	Brian P. O'Gorman	7,307	3.2
No party preference	Macy Jones	6,044	2.7
Write-in		141	0.1
Total votes		225,962	100.0

=== General election ===
==== Predictions ====
Source	Ranking	As of
Decision Desk HQ	Safe D	July 14, 2026
The Cook Political Report	Solid D	February 6, 2025
Inside Elections	Solid D	March 7, 2025
Sabato's Crystal Ball	Safe D	August 14, 2025
Split Ticket	Safe D	July 28, 2026

==== Post-primary endorsements ====
Emily Randall (D)

Organizations

- National Women's Political Caucus

==== Results ====
2026 Washington's 6th congressional district election
Party	Candidate	Votes	%
Democratic	Emily Randall (incumbent)		
Republican	Teresa Fox		
Total votes			100.0

== District 7 ==
2026 Washington's 7th congressional district election
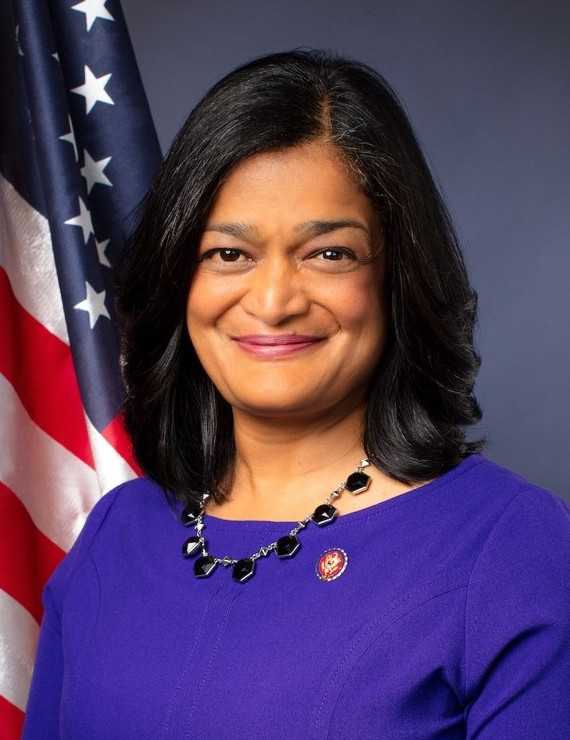

Nominee	Pramila Jayapal	Nirav Sheth
Party	Democratic	Republican
- Jayapal: 80–90%
Incumbent U.S. Representative
Pramila Jayapal
Democratic

The 7th district is based in northern and western Seattle. The incumbent is Democrat Pramila Jayapal, who was re-elected with 83.9% of the vote in 2024.

=== Candidates ===
==== Advanced to general ====
- Pramila Jayapal (Democratic), incumbent U.S. representative
- Nirav Sheth (Republican), restaurant owner and candidate for the 10th district in 2024

==== Eliminated in primary ====
- David W. Blomstrom (Fifth Republic)
- Gwen Kirkland (Democratic), community organizer

=== Endorsements ===
Pramila Jayapal (D)

Labor unions

- Washington State Labor Council

Organizations

- CAIR Action
- Center for Freethought Equality
- End Citizens United
- Giffords
- J Street
- National Women's Political Caucus
- Peace Action
- Planned Parenthood Action Fund
- Progressive Democrats of America
- Reproductive Freedom for All
- Track AIPAC

Newspapers

- The Stranger

=== Fundraising ===
Campaign finance reports as of March 31, 2026
Candidate	Raised	Spent	Cash on hand
Pramila Jayapal (D)	$2,014,217	$2,053,008	$1,973,933
Source: Federal Election Commission

=== Results ===
Results by county Jayapal: 80–90%

Blanket primary results
Party	Candidate	Votes	%
Democratic	Pramila Jayapal (incumbent)	182,844	84.4
Republican	Nirav Sheth	21,282	9.8
Democratic	Gwen Kirkland	7,519	3.5
Fifth Republic	David W. Blomstrom	4,294	2.0
Write-in		802	0.4
Total votes		216,741	100.0

=== General election ===
==== Predictions ====
Source	Ranking	As of
Decision Desk HQ	Safe D	July 14, 2026
The Cook Political Report	Solid D	February 6, 2025
Inside Elections	Solid D	March 7, 2025
Sabato's Crystal Ball	Safe D	August 14, 2025
Split Ticket	Safe D	July 28, 2026

==== Results ====
2026 Washington's 7th congressional district election
Party	Candidate	Votes	%
Democratic	Pramila Jayapal (incumbent)		
Republican	Nirav Sheth		
Total votes			100.0

== District 8 ==
2026 Washington's 8th congressional district election
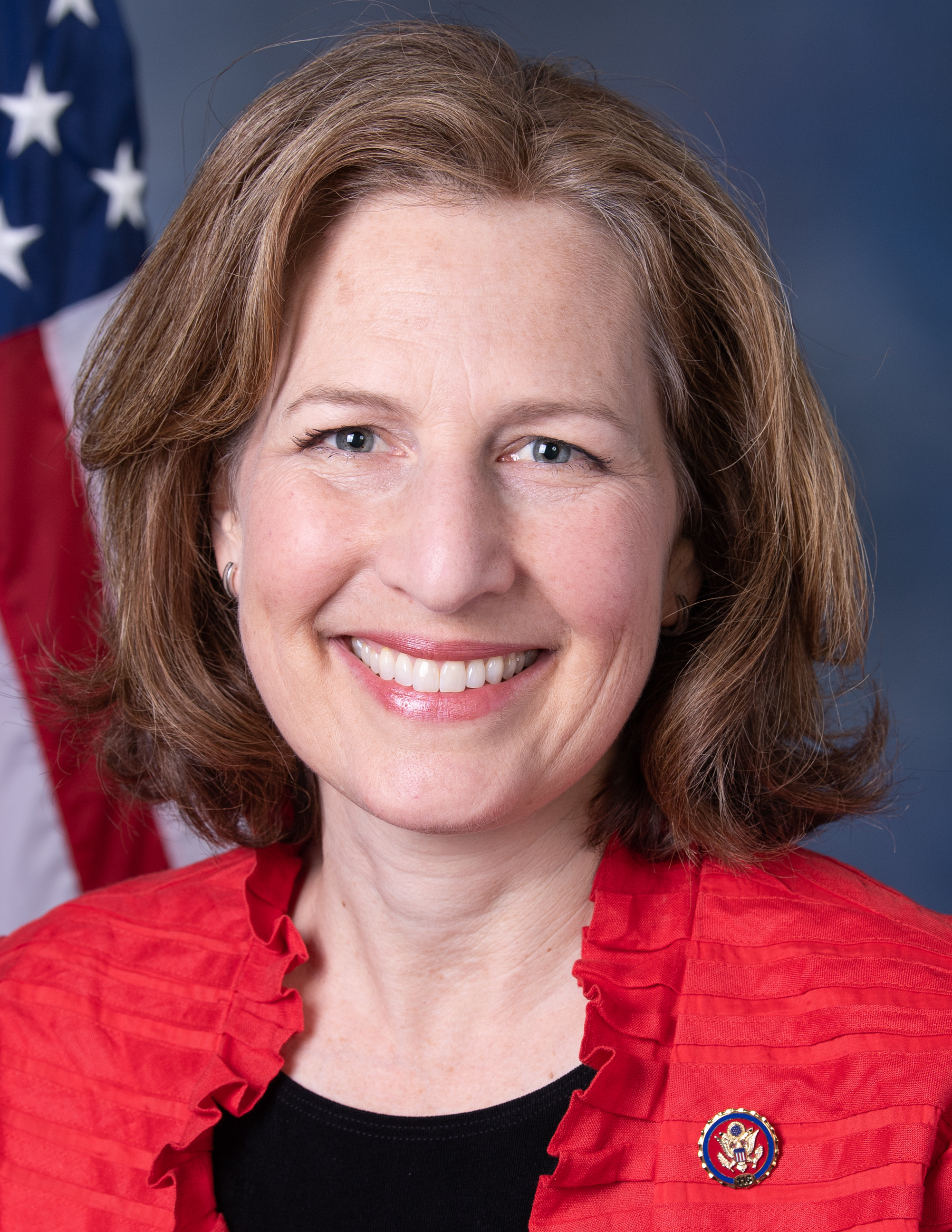

Nominee	Kim Schrier	Spencer Meline
Party	Democratic	Republican
- Schrier: 50–60% 60–70% Meline: 50–60%
Incumbent U.S. Representative
Kim Schrier
Democratic

The 8th district is based in the eastern suburbs of Seattle, including Sammamish, Issaquah, and Maple Valley, and also takes in areas east of the Cascades, including Wenatchee, Leavenworth, and Ellensburg. The incumbent is Democrat Kim Schrier, who was re-elected with 54.0% of the vote in 2024.

=== Candidates ===
==== Advanced to general ====
- Spencer Meline (Republican), small business owner
- Kim Schrier (Democratic), incumbent U.S. representative

==== Eliminated in primary ====
- Keith Arnold (Democratic)
- Trinh Ha (Republican), former consultant
- Bob Hagglund (Republican), IT professional and perennial candidate
- Andres Valleza (Republican), former parole officer

=== Endorsements ===
Trinh Ha (R)

Organizations

- Mainstream Republicans of Washington (co-endorsement with Hagglund)
Bob Hagglund (R)

Organizations

- Mainstream Republicans of Washington (co-endorsement with Ha)

Party chapters

- Snohomish County Republican Party (co-endorsement with Meline)
Spencer Meline (R)

Party chapters

- King County Republican Party
- Snohomish County Republican Party (co-endorsement with Hagglund)
Kim Schrier (D)

Labor unions

- Washington State Labor Council

Organizations

- AIPAC
- Democratic Majority for Israel
- J Street
- Jewish Democratic Council of America
- Joint Action Committee for Political Affairs
- National Women's Political Caucus
- Planned Parenthood Action Fund
- Reproductive Freedom for All
- Vote Mama

Newspapers

- The Stranger

=== Fundraising ===
Campaign finance reports as of March 31, 2026
Candidate	Raised	Spent	Cash on hand
Trinh Ha (R)	$102,951	$19,753	$83,197
Kim Schrier (D)	$2,449,112	$982,947	$3,287,787
Bob Hagglund (R)	$1,126	$19	$1,106
Spencer Meline (R)	$34,145	$914	$33,230.
Andres Valleza (R)	$18,105	$17,776	$406
Source: Federal Election Commission

=== Results ===
Results by county Schrier: 40–50% 60–70%

Blanket primary results
Party	Candidate	Votes	%
Democratic	Kim Schrier (incumbent)	102,853	53.7
Republican	Spencer Meline	30,324	15.8
Republican	Trinh Ha	28,340	14.8
Republican	Bob Hagglund	20,382	10.6
Democratic	Keith Arnold	4,777	2.5
Republican	Andres Valleza	4,549	2.4
Write-in		360	0.2
Total votes		191,585	100.0

=== General election ===
==== Predictions ====
Source	Ranking	As of
Decision Desk HQ	Safe D	September 25, 2026
The Cook Political Report	Solid D	August 13, 2026
Inside Elections	Solid D	March 7, 2025
Sabato's Crystal Ball	Safe D	November 19, 2025
Split Ticket	Safe D	July 28, 2026

==== Results ====
2026 Washington's 8th congressional district election
Party	Candidate	Votes	%
Democratic	Kim Schrier (incumbent)		
Republican	Spencer Meline		
Total votes			100.0

== District 9 ==
2026 Washington's 9th congressional district election
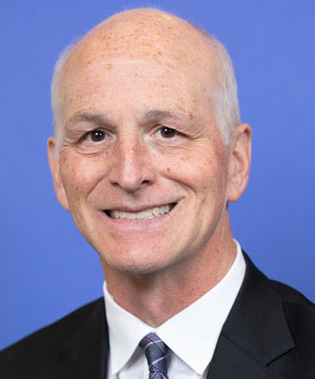

Nominee	Adam Smith	Doug Basler
Party	Democratic	Republican
- Smith: 70–80%
Incumbent U.S. Representative
Adam Smith
Democratic

The 9th district encompasses southern and eastern Seattle, southern Bellevue, and most of Renton, Kent, Auburn, and Federal Way. The incumbent is Democrat Adam Smith, who was re-elected with 65.4% of the vote in 2024.

=== Candidates ===
==== Advanced to general ====
- Doug Basler (Republican), businessman and perennial candidate
- Adam Smith (Democratic), incumbent U.S. representative

==== Eliminated in primary ====
- Melissa Chaudhry (Democratic), nonprofit grant writer and runner-up for this district in 2024
- Jacob Perasso (Socialist Workers)
- Kshama Sawant (Independent), former Seattle city councilor (2014–2024)

=== Endorsements ===
Adam Smith (D)

Labor unions

- IUOE Local 302
- Washington State Labor Council

Organizations

- AIPAC (fundraising suspended)
- J Street
- Planned Parenthood Action Fund
Kshama Sawant (I)

Individuals

- Chris Hedges, journalist and Presbyterian minister

Organizations

- Track AIPAC

Political parties

- Argentina's Workers' Party
- Green Party of Washington State
- Norway's Peace and Justice
- Revolutionary Communists of America

Newspapers

- Seattle Gay News
- The Stranger

=== Fundraising ===
Campaign finance reports as of July 15, 2026
Candidate	Raised	Spent	Cash on hand
Doug Basler (R)	$99,241	$94,764	$5,020
Melissa Chaudhry (D)	$30,072	$65,585	$67,155
Kshama Sawant (I)	$645,401	$607,493	$37,907
Adam Smith (D)	$1,882,001	$1,583,205	$869,548
Source: Federal Election Commission

=== Results ===
Results by county Smith: 40–50%

Blanket primary results
Party	Candidate	Votes	%
Democratic	Adam Smith (incumbent)	67,095	47.1
Republican	Doug Basler	31,070	21.8
Independent	Kshama Sawant	24,583	17.3
Democratic	Melissa Chaudhry	17,811	12.5
Socialist Workers	Jacob Perasso	1,588	1.1
Write-in		209	0.1
Total votes		142,356	100.0

=== General election ===
==== Predictions ====
Source	Ranking	As of
Decision Desk HQ	Safe D	July 14, 2026
The Cook Political Report	Solid D	February 6, 2025
Inside Elections	Solid D	March 7, 2025
Sabato's Crystal Ball	Safe D	August 14, 2025
Split Ticket	Safe D	July 28, 2026

==== Results ====
2026 Washington's 9th congressional district election
Party	Candidate	Votes	%
Democratic	Adam Smith (incumbent)		
Republican	Doug Basler		
Total votes			100.0

== District 10 ==
2026 Washington's 10th congressional district election
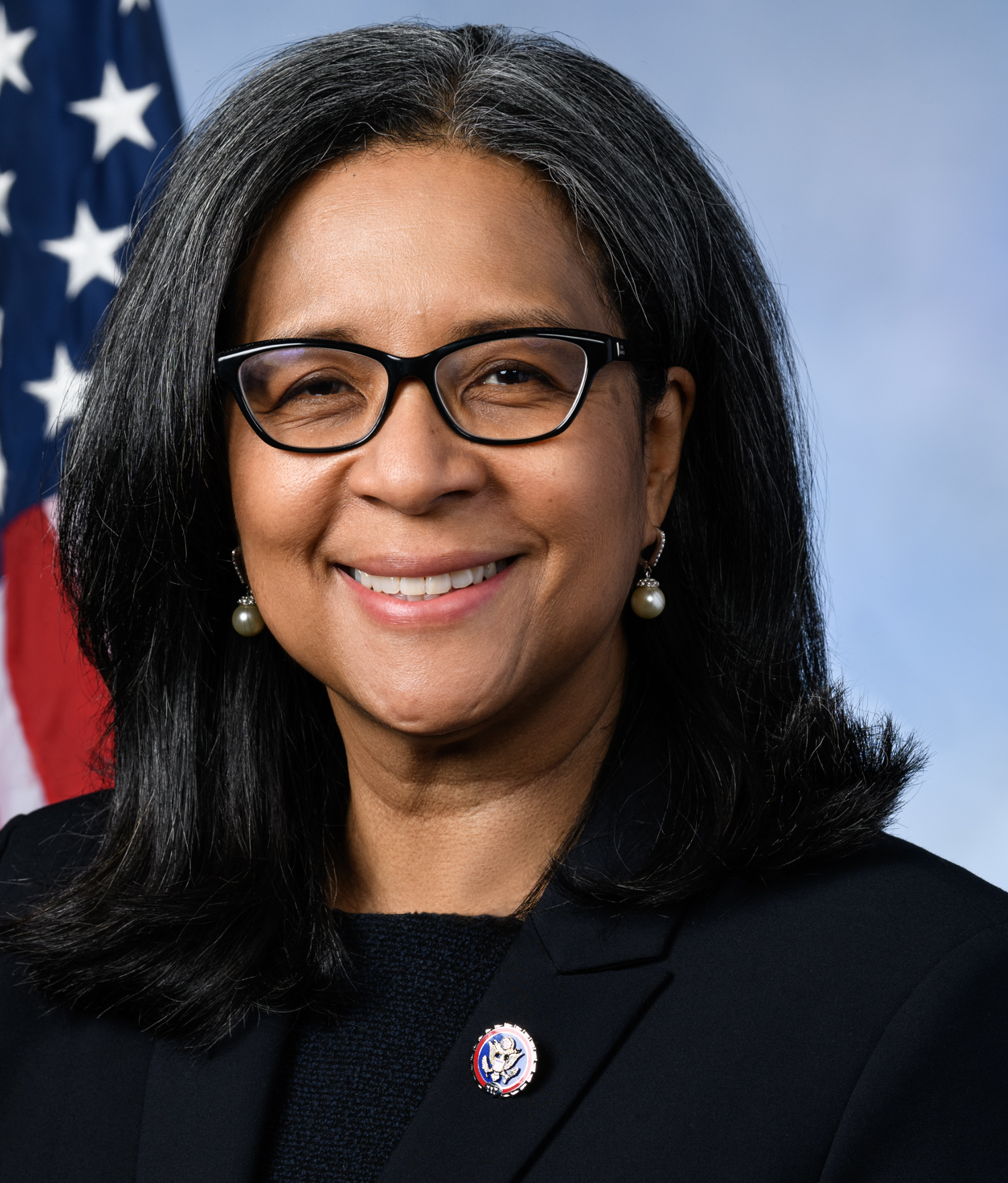

Nominee	Marilyn Strickland	Chris D. Chung
Party	Democratic	Republican
- Strickland: 60–70%
Incumbent U.S. Representative
Marilyn Strickland
Democratic

The 10th district is based in Olympia and stretches to the southern Seattle metropolitan area, including Lakewood and Puyallup. The incumbent is Democrat Marilyn Strickland, who was re-elected with 58.5% of the vote in 2024.

=== Candidates ===
==== Advanced to general ====
- Chris D. Chung (Republican), pharmacist and Democratic candidate for insurance commissioner in 2024
- Marilyn Strickland (Democratic), incumbent U.S. representative

==== Eliminated in primary ====
- Adam Arafat (Democratic), county government official
- Kurtis Engle (Union)
- Derek Maynes (Independent), Democratic candidate for state representative in 2016
- Alex Scheel (Democratic), community organizer

=== Endorsements ===
Marilyn Strickland (D)

Labor unions

- Washington State Labor Council

Organizations

- AIPAC
- Democratic Majority for Israel
- National Women's Political Caucus
- Planned Parenthood Action Fund
- U.S. Chamber of Commerce
Alex Scheel (D)

Organizations

- CAIR Action
- International Franchise Association

=== Fundraising ===
Campaign finance reports as of March 31, 2026
Candidate	Raised	Spent	Cash on hand
Marilyn Strickland (D)	$1,161,277	$939,436	$802,429
Adam Arafat (D)	$330	$0	$330
Source: Federal Election Commission

=== Results ===
Results by county Strickland: 40–50%

Blanket primary results
Party	Candidate	Votes	%
Democratic	Marilyn Strickland (incumbent)	73,689	47.3
Republican	Chris D. Chung	48,953	31.4
Democratic	Alex Scheel	16,074	10.3
Democratic	Adam Arafat	14,695	9.4
Independent	Derek Maynes	1,431	0.9
Union	Kurtis Engle	713	0.5
Write-in		367	0.2
Total votes		155,922	100.0

=== General election ===
==== Predictions ====
Source	Ranking	As of
Decision Desk HQ	Safe D	July 14, 2026
The Cook Political Report	Solid D	February 6, 2025
Inside Elections	Solid D	March 7, 2025
Sabato's Crystal Ball	Safe D	August 14, 2025
Split Ticket	Safe D	July 28, 2026

==== Results ====
2026 Washington's 10th congressional district election
Party	Candidate	Votes	%
Democratic	Marilyn Strickland (incumbent)		
Republican	Chris D. Chung		
Total votes			100.0

== See also ==
- United States House of Representatives
- Elections in Washington (state)
- Washington State Redistricting Commission
- Political party strength in Washington (state)

== Notes ==
Partisan clients
