= Carmela Conroy =

American diplomat (born 1962)

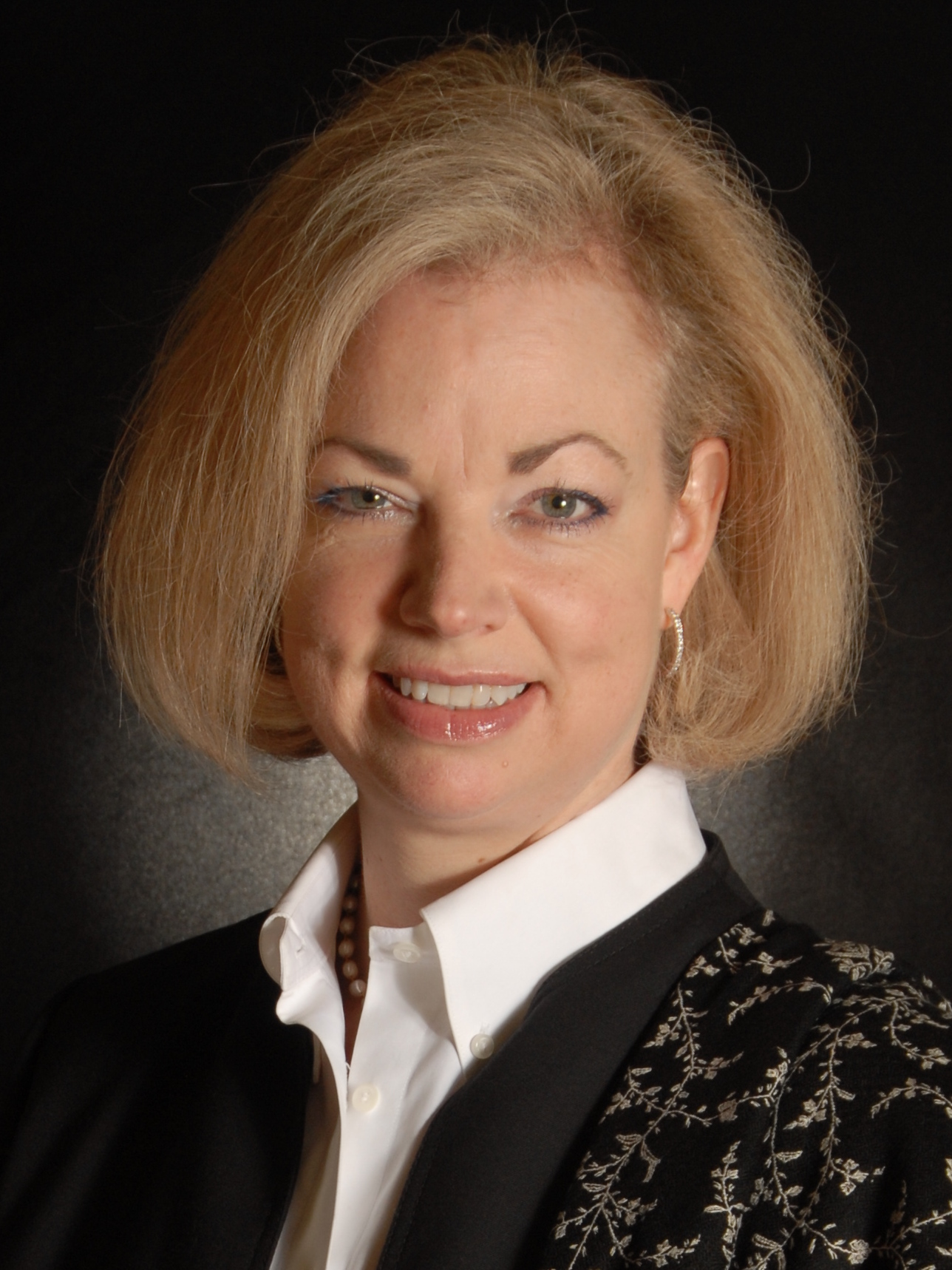
- Conroy in 2011

Chair of the Spokane County Democratic Party
- In office 2022–2024

Personal details
- Born: April 17, 1962 (age 64)
- Party: Democratic
- Education: University of Washington (BA, JD); Naval War College (MA)
- Awards: CIA Seal Medal

Carmela Conroy (born April 17, 1962) is an American diplomat, politician, and former career Foreign Service officer who served as the U.S. consul general in Lahore, Pakistan, during the 2011 Raymond Davis incident, a diplomatic crisis between the United States and Pakistan.

Her assignments with the United States Foreign Service spanned Japan, New Zealand, Afghanistan, Norway, and Pakistan, where she held roles in political affairs, consular operations, public diplomacy, and interagency coordination. Before joining the Foreign Service, Conroy served as a deputy prosecutor in Spokane County, Washington.

In 2022, Conroy became the chair of the Spokane County chapter of the Democratic Party. In 2024, she ran to represent Washington's 5th congressional district in Congress, losing by 20 points to Republican Michael Baumgartner. She is running against Baumgartner again in the 2026 election.

== Early life and education ==
Conroy was raised in Spokane Valley, Washington. She graduated from Central Valley High School in 1980 before attending the University of Washington.

She earned her Bachelor of Arts in international trade and investment from the University of Washington and returned to Seattle to study law, earning her Juris Doctor from the University of Washington School of Law, where she served as President of the Student Bar Association.

She later earned an master's degree in national security studies, graduating with highest distinction from the U.S. Naval War College's College of Naval Command and Staff. Her master's thesis focused on civil-military coordination and political stabilization.

== Legal career ==
Following law school and before her diplomatic career, Conroy worked as a deputy prosecutor in Spokane County and a corporate lawyer for Nissan.

== Foreign service career ==
=== Early postings ===
Conroy joined the United States Foreign Service in 1996. Her early assignments included postings in Auckland and Tokyo, where she worked on political, consular, and public diplomacy issues. In Tokyo, she was involved in diplomatic engagement related to the Atsugi incinerator emissions dispute. Between 2000 and 2001, Conroy served as a watch officer in the State Department's Operations Center, summarizing overseas communications and news reports for cabinet secretaries. In the aftermath of the September 11 attacks, she was in Washington, D.C. answering calls of support from America's allies.

=== Afghanistan ===
Following completion of her master's degree at the Naval War College in 2004, Conroy joined the Provincial Reconstruction Team in Bamyan, Afghanistan, where she advised the New Zealand-led command on political issues, security reform, and humanitarian assistance. She later returned to Afghanistan to serve as refugee coordinator for Pakistan, Afghanistan, and Iran during the post-9/11 conflicts, overseeing protection and repatriation programs.

=== Consul General in Lahore ===
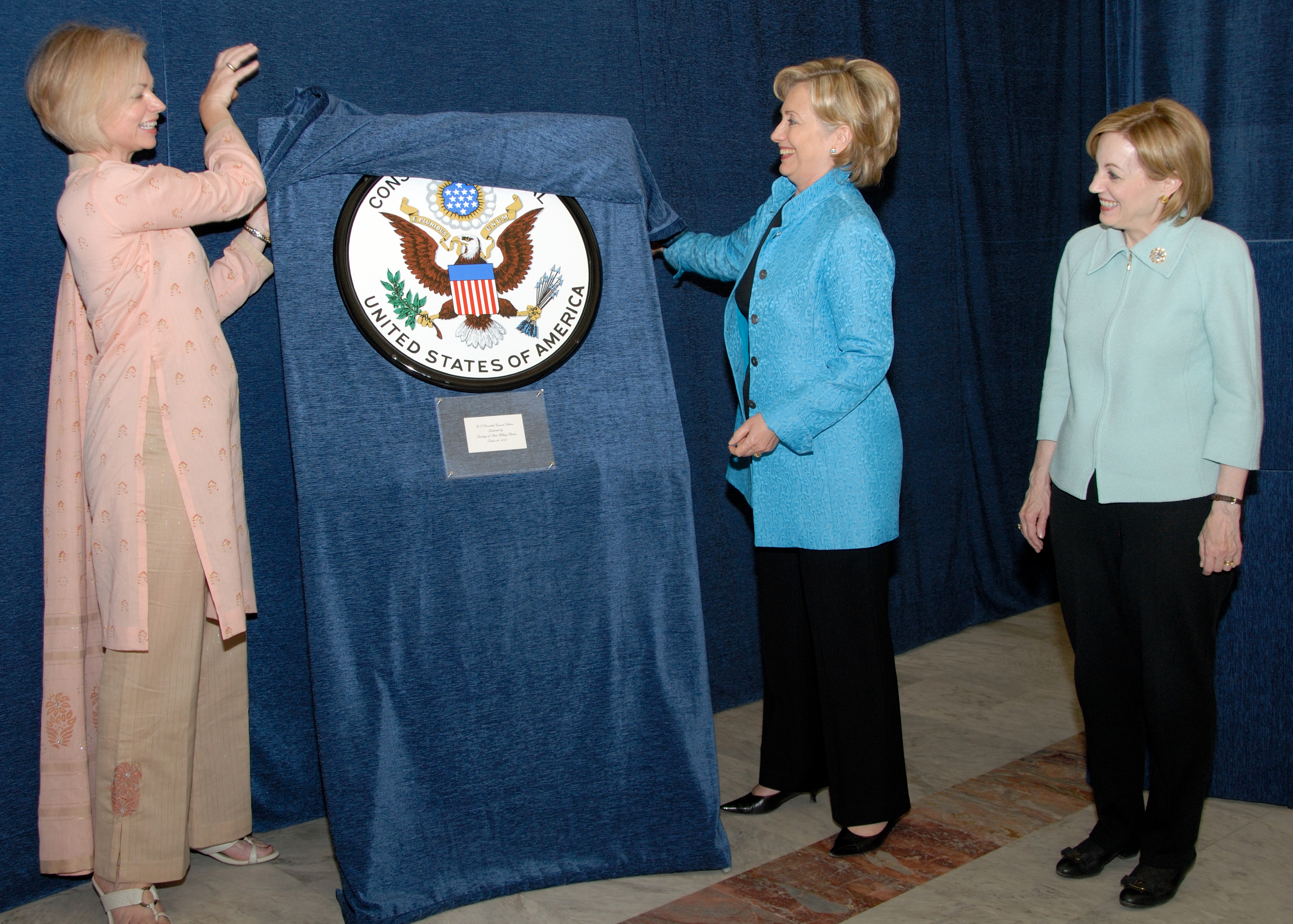
Secretary of State Hillary Clinton and Conroy unveiling the new Consulate General seal in Lahore, October 29, 2009.

Conroy served as the U.S. Consul General in Lahore, Pakistan, becoming the senior American diplomat in Punjab province from 2009 to 2011.

During her tenure, Lahore and the wider Punjab province experienced a series of major militant attacks. On October 15, 2009, coordinated gun and bomb assaults in Lahore targeted police and intelligence facilities, killing dozens. On December 7, twin blasts at Moon Market in Allama Iqbal Town killed dozens and wounded about 100 people. This was followed on December 15 by a bombing in Dera Ghazi Khan that killed at least 33 people in a crowded market area. In March 2010, Lahore experienced further violence with twin suicide attacks on 12 March that killed at least 45 people and injured more than 100. On May 28, militants carried out coordinated attacks on two Ahmadi mosques in Lahore, killing 94 worshippers and injuring more than 100.

Conroy's diplomatic counterparts included Punjab Governor Salman Taseer, with whom Secretary of State Hillary Clinton met during Clinton's October 2009 Lahore visit. Taseer was assassinated by his bodyguard on January 4, 2011, while Conroy remained in her post. During the Raymond Davis crisis, Jamaat-e-Islami protesters demanded authorities register charges against Conroy and threatened to besiege the U.S. consulate.

=== Later assignments ===
Following her assignment in Lahore, Conroy served at the U.S. Embassy in Oslo as Political and Economic Affairs Counselor from 2012 to 2015, where she worked on alliance management and diplomatic engagement with Norwegian partners.

She later returned to Japan as Director of the FSI Yokohama Japanese Language and Area Training Center from 2018 to 2020. In June 2018, she delivered the keynote address at the University of Washington Jackson School of International Studies graduation ceremony.

=== Raymond Davis incident ===
On January 27, 2011, CIA security contractor Raymond Allen Davis was arrested after shooting two men he said were trying to rob him at gunpoint; a third Pakistani man died when a U.S. consulate vehicle responding to the scene struck his motorcycle.

Davis spent 49 days in custody, most of them in Kot Lakhpat Jail. According to his memoir, Conroy was the senior U.S. diplomat responsible for the consulate’s response. Davis writes that she was among the first U.S. officials to see him after his arrest, that she arranged medical documentation of his treatment, briefed him on his rights under the Vienna Convention, and provided him with a notebook to send written messages to his family through consular channels. He describes Conroy and other consulate personnel visiting him regularly, monitoring his welfare, and challenging prison officials over his treatment.

On 16 March 2011, the families of the two men Davis killed accepted compensation under Pakistan’s diyat law, and he was released and transferred to U.S. custody the same day.

Steve Coll's Directorate S notes that Davis's detention became intertwined with U.S. planning for a potential raid on Osama bin Laden's suspected hideout in Abbottabad. Coll writes that after CIA Director Leon Panetta briefed the White House, National Security Adviser Tom Donilon told him that President Barack Obama "believes we need to move very quickly," a judgment that "increased the pressure to somehow extract Raymond Davis from Pakistani custody," because "if the United States attacked the Abbottabad house on its own and Davis was still in prison, he might well be killed." Davis was released seven weeks before U.S. Navy SEALs conducted Operation Neptune Spear on 2 May 2011, killing bin Laden in Abbottabad. Conroy received the CIA's Agency Seal Medal for her work during Davis's detention.

Her role in the Davis case is documented in Davis’s memoir The Contractor, Steve Coll’s Directorate S, contemporary international reporting, and a 2011 feature profile in GT Magazine.

== Political career and positions ==
Conroy served as chair of the Spokane County Democratic Party from February 28, 2022 to January 25, 2024, preceded by Nicole Bishop and succeeded by Stephen Kirby as acting chair. She was elected chair in February 2022, following the resignation of incumbent chair Nicole Bishop.

=== Immigration ===
At a 2026 primary election candidate forum, Conroy expressed support for the "dismantl[ing] and behead[ing]" of Immigration and Customs Enforcement (ICE) and the Department of Homeland Security (DHS). At a general election debate in Walla Walla, Conroy denied making those statements.

=== LGBTQ+ rights ===
Conroy supports the expansion of Title XI protections to include transgender people and the introduction of new laws protecting transgender children, including the Equality Act. She has advocated for gender-affirming care to be treated as healthcare under Medicaid.

=== Israel ===
Conroy ran an explicitly pro-Israel campaign in 2024, before later pivoting to calling for an arms embargo in her 2026 campaign. She has declined to refer to the Gaza genocide as a genocide.

== U.S. House campaigns ==
=== 2024 ===
In 2024, Conroy ran as the Democratic candidate for Washington's 5th congressional district against Republican Michael Baumgartner for the seat being vacated by Representative Cathy McMorris Rodgers. Conroy had resigned as chair of the Spokane County Democratic Party earlier that year to focus on her congressional campaign.

Conroy advanced from the August blanket primary, finishing second with 37,227 votes, or 18.32 percent, behind Baumgartner. She was one of two candidates to advance to the general election from a field of eleven candidates.

In the November general election, Conroy faced Baumgartner in a rematch of the primary's top two finishers. Baumgartner defeated Conroy, receiving 240,619 votes (60.57%) to Conroy's 156,074 (39.29%). The 21.28-percentage-point margin was among the largest margins in the district's recent congressional elections.

=== 2026 ===
Conroy announced in 2025 that she would seek election to the 5th congressional district again in 2026, setting up a potential rematch with Baumgartner. The district remained heavily Republican, and early coverage characterized Conroy's campaign as a difficult challenge to the incumbent.

The campaign attracted a large field of candidates under Washington's top-two primary system. The final field included incumbent Republican Michael Baumgartner, Conroy, and ten other candidates, including several Democrats and independent candidates. The Washington Secretary of State listed Conroy as a Democratic candidate and Nate Powell as an independent candidate in the 2026 primary.

Conroy entered the primary with the advantage of having already been the Democratic nominee in the district and having previously advanced to a general election against Baumgartner. Her principal competition for the second position, however, developed into an unexpected contest with Powell. Powell, a Spokane firefighter and Marine Corps veteran, initially received less attention than Conroy, who had already run a competitive congressional campaign and had established herself as one of the district's leading Democratic candidates.

As the primary campaign progressed, Powell emerged as a significant contender for the second-place spot. His campaign also became financially competitive with Conroy's. By mid-July, Powell's campaign had raised approximately $359,951 for the 2026 cycle, compared with approximately $399,832 raised by Conroy, according to campaign-finance filings. The relatively small difference in fundraising between the two campaigns helped make the contest for second place one of the more closely watched aspects of the primary.

The August 4 primary ultimately produced a substantial victory for Baumgartner, who received 96,791 votes (47.44 percent). Conroy finished second with 38,487 votes (18.86 percent), while Powell finished third with 33,443 votes (16.39 percent). Conroy's margin over Powell was 5,044 votes, or 2.47 percentage points.

Despite finishing third, Powell's performance made the race for second place considerably closer than the initial political standing of the candidates might have suggested. He received more than 33,000 votes and finished only about two and a half percentage points behind Conroy in a twelve-candidate field. Conroy nevertheless retained second place and advanced to the general election for a second consecutive cycle, again facing Baumgartner.

Conroy's advancement marked the second consecutive election in which she finished among the top two candidates in the district's primary. The 2026 result also established her as the Democratic candidate in a second consecutive general-election contest against Baumgartner.

== Personal life ==
Conroy has not married and has no children. She has siblings across the Inland Northwest. She maintains a home in Spokane.

== Electoral history ==
=== 2024 election ===
Primary results by county
Baumgartner
- 30–40%
- 20–30%
Maycumber
- 30–40%
- 20–30%
Dansel
- 20–30%

General results by county
Baumgartner
- 50–60%
- 60–70%
- 70–80%
- 80–90%

2024 U.S. House election results

2024 Washington's 5th congressional district election
Primary election
Party	Candidate	Votes	%
Republican	Michael Baumgartner	55,859	27.5
Democratic	Carmela Conroy	37,227	18.3
Republican	Jacquelin Maycumber	27,717	13.6
Democratic	Bernadine Bank	24,111	11.9
Republican	Brian Dansel	21,983	10.8
Democratic	Ann Marie Danimus	11,306	5.6
Republican	Jonathan Bingle	7,510	3.7
Republican	Rene Holaday	6,180	3.0
Republican	Rick Flynn	4,822	2.4
Democratic	Matthew Welde	4,183	2.1
Democratic	Bobbi Bennett-Wolcott	2,336	1.1
Write-in		175	0.1
Total votes		203,409	100.0
General election
Republican	Michael Baumgartner	240,619	60.6
Democratic	Carmela Conroy	156,074	39.3
Write-in		593	0.1
Total votes		397,286	100.0

Results by county Baumgartner: 40–50% 50–60% 60–70% 70–80%

2026 Washington's 5th congressional district election
Party	Candidate	Votes	%
Republican	Michael Baumgartner (incumbent)	96,791	47.4
Democratic	Carmela Conroy	38,487	18.8
Independent	Nate Powell	33,443	16.4
Democratic	Kevin Fagan	9,048	4.4
Democratic	David Womack	7,242	3.5
Democratic	Bajun Mavalwalla	6,482	3.2
Independent	Ann Marie Danimus	2,920	1.4
Democratic	Richard Freudenberg	2,866	1.4
Independent	Matthew Hayes	2,417	1.2
Independent	Kyle Usrey	2,274	1.1
Democratic	Michael McGarr	1,152	0.6
Independent	Andrew Bartleson	915	0.4
Write-in		172	0.1
Total votes		204,209	100.0
General election
Republican	Michael Baumgartner (incumbent)		
Democratic	Carmela Conroy		
Write-in			
Total votes			

== See also ==
- Raymond Allen Davis incident
- United States Foreign Service
- Pakistan–United States relations
