= Cascade Party of Washington =

American political party

- Leader: Krist Novoselic
- Founder: Krist Novoselic
- Registered: 2024
- Split from: Forward Party
- Membership: <1,000
- Ideology: Centrism; Populism; Electoral reform; Social libertarianism; Cascadian regionalism
- Political position: Center
- Colors: Purple

Website
- https://cascadeparty.org/

The Cascade Party of Washington is a minor political party in the United States located in the state of Washington. Former Nirvana bassist Krist Novoselic founded the centrist party in 2024. The party hoped to gather 1,000 signatures in order to qualify as a political party in Washington, however it hoped to not appear on the ballot in the 2024 presidential election. In order to garner support, it collected signatures during Novoselic's concerts. It qualified as a minor political party in Washington on August 24, 2024, and its request to be omitted from the 2024 presidential election ballot in the state was granted the same day.

The party's inaugural convention, open to members of their private social media platform, was held on 11 January, 2025, at the Hotel Sorrento in Seattle. The party's second convention occurred in January 2026 and a new slate of Board Members was voted in.

== Election results ==
=== Presidential elections ===
Year	Presidential candidate	Vice presidential candidate	Popular votes	%	Electoral votes	Result	Ballot access	Notes	Ref
2024	Krist Novoselic	James Carroll	Withdrawn				WA	Withdrew August 26, 2024	

=== Congressional elections ===
Year	Candidate	District	Primary election			General election			Notes	Ref
Year	Candidate	District	Votes	%	Result	Votes	%	Result	Notes	Ref
2026	Antony Barran	WA 3	763	0.55%	Lost	Did not advance				
2026	Devin Pooré	WA 4	873	1.19%	Lost	Did not advance				

=== State legislative elections ===
Year	Candidate	Office	District	Primary election			General election			Notes	Ref
Year	Candidate	Office	District	Votes	%	Result	Votes	%	Result	Notes	Ref
2026	Jeff Kelly	State Representative	38-1	4,791	27.75%	Advanced	Results TBD				
2026	Logan Evans	State Representative	47-1	1,558	10.80%	Lost	Did not advance			On the ballot as "Cascade Democrat"	

== Notable Board Members ==
- Krist Novoselic (Chair)
- Jesse A. James (Co-Chair, Seattle Mayoral Candidate)
- Johann Peters
- Kelly Wright
- Damon Townsend
- Erik Raistakka
