= 2024 Seattle City Council special election =

Washington state local election

2024 District 8 special election
- November 5, 2024
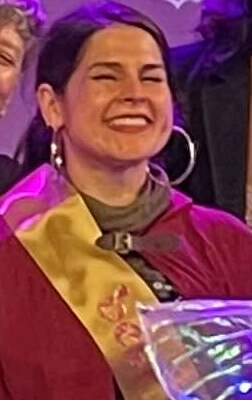

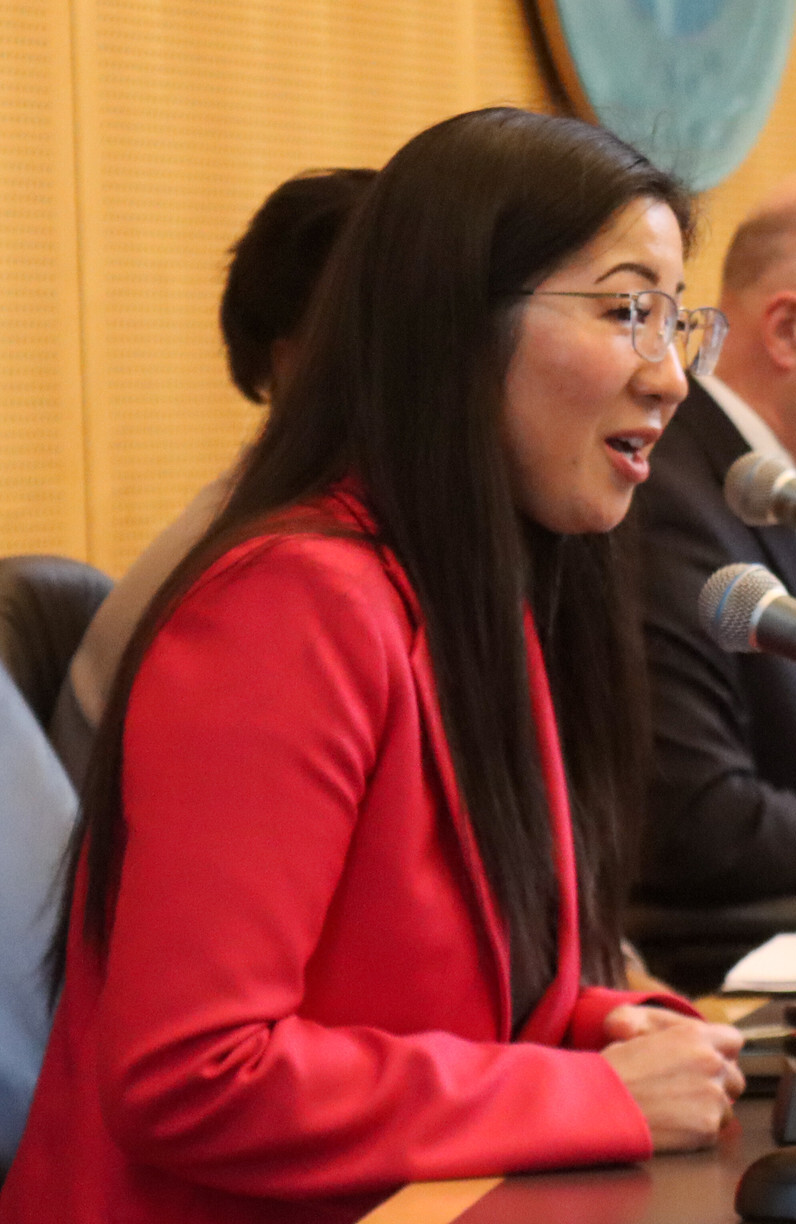
Candidate	Alexis Mercedes Rinck	Tanya Woo
Popular vote	215,642	153,146
Percentage	58.24%	41.36%
Councilor before election
Tanya Woo
Democratic
Elected Councilor
Alexis Mercedes Rinck
Democratic

The 2024 Seattle City Council special election was held on November 5, 2024, following a primary election on August 6. The election occurred to fill a vacancy for the 8th district due to the resignation of Teresa Mosqueda, who was elected to the King County Council in the 2023 election. Tanya Woo was appointed in January 2024 by the City Council to the seat until the general election occurred to fill the seat for the remainder of the term. The next regular election for the 8th district occurred in 2025.

== Endorsements ==
Alexis Mercedes Rinck

State legislators

- Darya Farivar, state representative
- Noel Frame, state senator
- Nicole Macri, state representative
- Gerry Pollet, state representative
- Rebecca Saldaña, state senator
- Yasmin Trudeau, state senator

City council members

- Lisa Herbold, former Seattle city councilor (2016–2024)
- Andrew Lewis, former Seattle city councilor (2020–2024)
- Tammy Morales, Seattle city councilor

Organizations

- National Women's Political Caucus of Washington

Newspapers

- The Stranger

Labor unions

- SEIU Local 6
- SEIU Local 775
- SEIU Local 925
- UFCW Local 3000
- United Auto Workers

Political parties

- King County Democrats
- Washington State Stonewall Democrats
- Working Families Party
- Washington's 32nd legislative district Democrats
- Washington's 34th legislative district Democrats
- Washington's 36th legislative district Democrats
- Washington's 43rd legislative district Democrats
- Washington's 46th legislative district Democrats
Tanya Woo

Governors

- Gary Locke, former Governor of Washington (1997–2005)

City council members

- Debora Juarez, former Seattle city councilor (2016–2024)
- Peter Steinbrueck, former Seattle city councilor (1997–2008)
- 7 of 8 current Seattle City Councilors

Organizations

- Democrats for Diversity and Inclusion
- Justice Opportunity Liberty Politico (JOLPOL)

Newspapers

- The Seattle Times
Saunatina Sanchez

Organizations

- National Women's Political Caucus of Washington

== Primary results ==
2024 Seattle City Council District 8 special primary election
Candidate	Votes	%
Alexis Mercedes Rinck	99,394	50.18%
Tanya Woo (incumbent)	76,008	38.38%
Saunatina Sanchez	8,621	4.35%
Tariq Yusuf	7,521	3.80%
Saul Patu	5,958	3.01%
Write-in	554	0.28%
Total votes	198,056	100.00%

== Debate & forum ==
=== Primary election ===
2024 Seattle City Council special election primary candidate forum
No.	Date	Host	Moderator	Nonpartisan	Nonpartisan	Nonpartisan
Key: P Participant A Absent N Not invited I Invited W Withdrawn						
Key: P Participant A Absent N Not invited I Invited W Withdrawn				Tanya Woo	Alexis Mercedes Rinck	Saunatina Sanchez
1	Jun. 3, 2024	Haller Lake United Methodist Church	Colleen Echohawk	P	P	P

=== General election ===
2024 Seattle City Council special election debate
No.	Date	Host	Moderator	Nonpartisan	Nonpartisan
Key: P Participant A Absent N Not invited I Invited W Withdrawn					
Key: P Participant A Absent N Not invited I Invited W Withdrawn				Tanya Woo	Alexis Mercedes Rinck
1	Sep. 18, 2024	KCPQ; Seattle City-Club	John Hopperstad	P	P

== General results ==
2024 Seattle City Council District 8 special general election
Candidate	Votes	%
Alexis Mercedes Rinck	215,642	58.24%
Tanya Woo (incumbent)	153,146	41.36%
Write-in	1,491	0.40%
Total votes	370,279	100.00%
