= Senator Rinehart =

Senator Rinehart may refer to:

- Nita Rinehart (born 1940), Washington State Senate
- William A. Rinehart (1846–1922), Virginia State Senate
- William V. Rinehart (1835–1918), Washington State Senate
