= Ken Jacobsen =

American politician

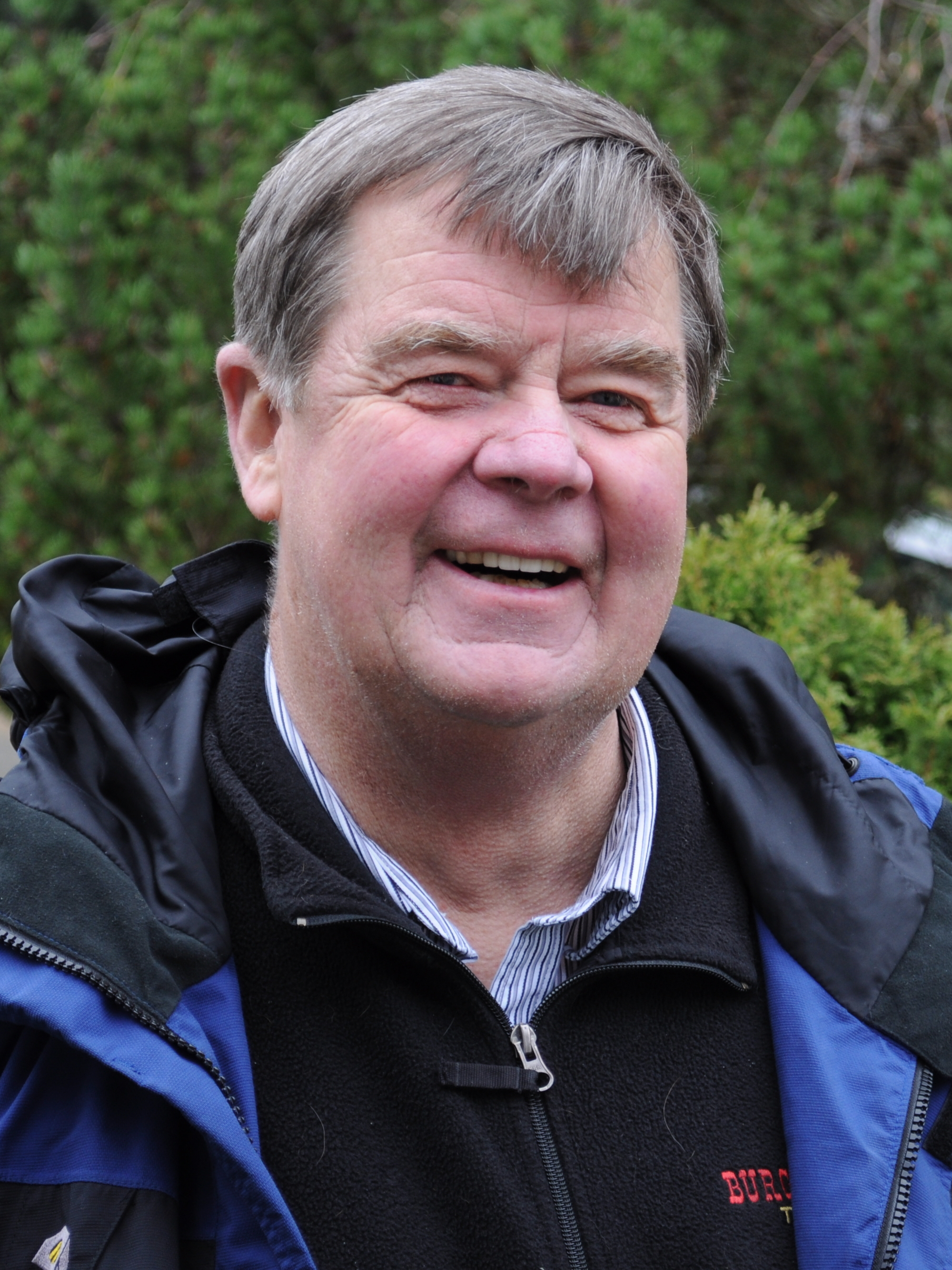
- Jacobsen in 2010

Member of the Washington Senate from the 46th district
- In office January 6, 1997 – January 10, 2011
- Preceded by: Nita Rinehart
- Succeeded by: Scott White

Member of the Washington House of Representatives from the 46th district
- In office January 10, 1983 – January 6, 1997
- Preceded by: William H. "Skeeter" Ellis
- Succeeded by: Phyllis Gutiérrez Kenney

Personal details
- Born: Ken Gene Jacobsen; May 2, 1945 (age 81) Dannebrog, Nebraska, U.S.
- Party: Democratic
- Spouse: Rachel Jacobsen
- Children: 2
- Education: University of Washington

Ken Jacobsen (born May 2, 1945) is an American former politician who served as a Democratic member of the Washington State Senate. He was first elected to the Washington State Legislature in 1982 and he served through 2010.

== Political history ==
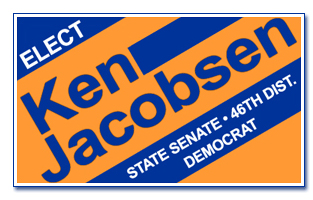

He was elected to represent the 46th Legislative District in the Washington State House of Representatives in 1982 and was subsequently reelected for six more terms. He was appointed (and subsequently elected) to the State Senate in 1997, and served as Senator though 2010. He served as the Democratic Caucus Vice Chairman in 2003, the Majority Caucus Vice Chairman in 1999 and 2001, and he is a former chair of the House Higher Education Committee. He was the chair of the Senate Natural Resources, Oceans and Recreation Committee, and also served on the Transportation Committee, the Higher Education & Workforce Development Committee and the Agriculture and Rural Economic Development Committee. He was also a member of the Democratic Socialists of America.

=== District ===
In the State Senate, Jacobsen represented the Seattle neighborhoods of Wedgwood, View Ridge, Sand Point, Roosevelt, Northgate, Maple Leaf, and Lake City.

== Personal ==
Born in Dannebrog, Nebraska, of "Postcard from Nebraska" fame and raised in northeast Seattle, Jacobsen enjoys bird watching, hummingbird and butterfly gardening. He has been married to Rachel Jacobsen, a teacher from New Zealand, since 1972. They have two daughters, Sonja (Wellesley College, 1999, University of Washington School of Law, 2007) and Kiri (Tulane University, 2000).

== Recent awards and recognition ==
Glenn Galbreath Spirit Award, 2006; Stanley O. McNaughton Leadership Award, 2002; Survivors of the Holocaust Asset Recovery Project of Washington—Honorary Board Member; Northwest Dollars for Scholars Community Hero Award. Washington State Governor Christine Gregoire declared May 22, 2009 Ken Jacobsen day in the State of Washington.

== Civic organizations ==
Board member of Scholarship America and Washington Dollars for Scholars; U.S. Foundation of the Universidad Del Valle de Guatemala; Friends of the University of Washington Library; Seattle Audubon Society; American Indian Endowment Committee; Ravenna & Thornton Creek Alliances'; Bring the Purple Martin Back to Seattle Committee; Education Advisory Committee Nordic Heritage Museum; Founder of the Annual Raoul Wallenberg Dinner. Lifelong member of the Disabled American Veterans.
