= Javier Valdez =

American politician from Washington

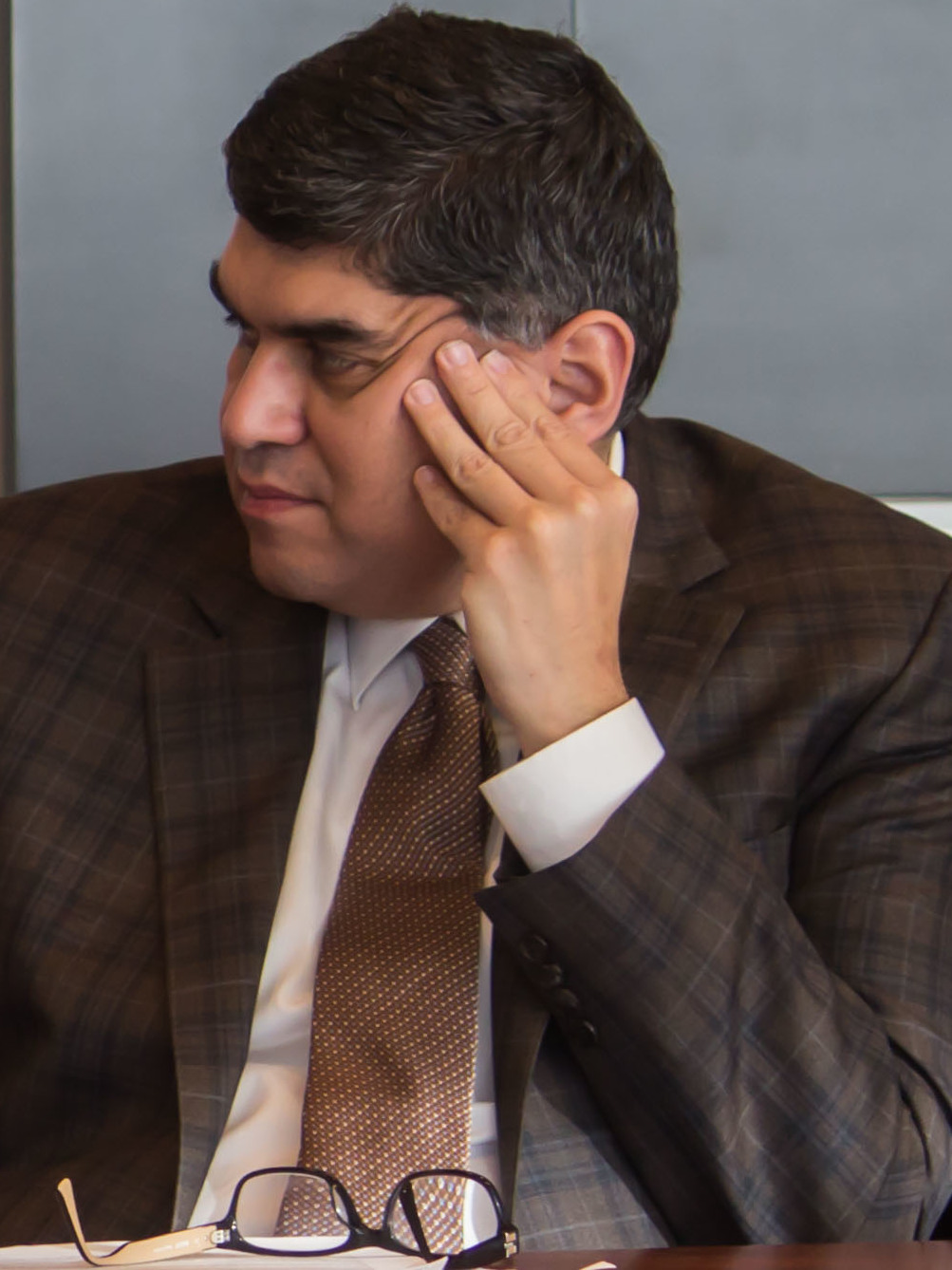

Member of the Washington State Senate from the 46th district
- Incumbent
- Assumed office January 9, 2023
- Preceded by: David Frockt

Member of the Washington House of Representatives from the 46th district
- In office June 12, 2017 – January 9, 2023
- Preceded by: Jessyn Farrell
- Succeeded by: Darya Farivar

Personal details
- Born: July 3, 1970 (age 56) Moses Lake, Washington, U.S.
- Party: Democratic
- Education: University of Washington (BA); Baruch College (MPA)
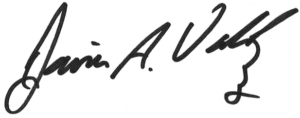
- Signature

Javier A. Valdez (born July 3, 1970) is an American politician of the Democratic Party. He is a member of the Washington State Senate, representing the 46th Legislative District. Valdez was the first choice of the Precinct Committee Officers to fill the vacancy after Jessyn Farrell resigned to focus on her run for Mayor of Seattle.

Valdez served on the Executive Board for the Washington State Democrats from 2003 until 2017. He also served as Chair of the 43rd District Democrats from 1997 to 2002 and Chair of the 46th District Democrats from 2007 to 2009.

Valdez worked for the city of Seattle for more than 20 years, mostly for Seattle City Light and as an aide to former Mayor Ed Murray.
