= Matilda F. Jones =

American politician

Member of the Washington House of Representatives from the 46th district
- In office 1949–1953
- In office 1955–1957

Personal details
- Born: December 14, 1899 St. Helena, California
- Died: June 25, 1982 (aged 82) Langley, Washington
- Party: Republican
- Education: Central Washington College of Education

Matilda F. Jones (December 14, 1899 – June 25, 1982) was an American politician. She was a Republican, representing District 46 in the Washington House of Representatives which included parts of King County, for three terms between 1949 and 1957. Jones was born in California to immigrant parents from Denmark.
