= Phyllis Gutiérrez Kenney =

American politician from Washington (1936–2025)

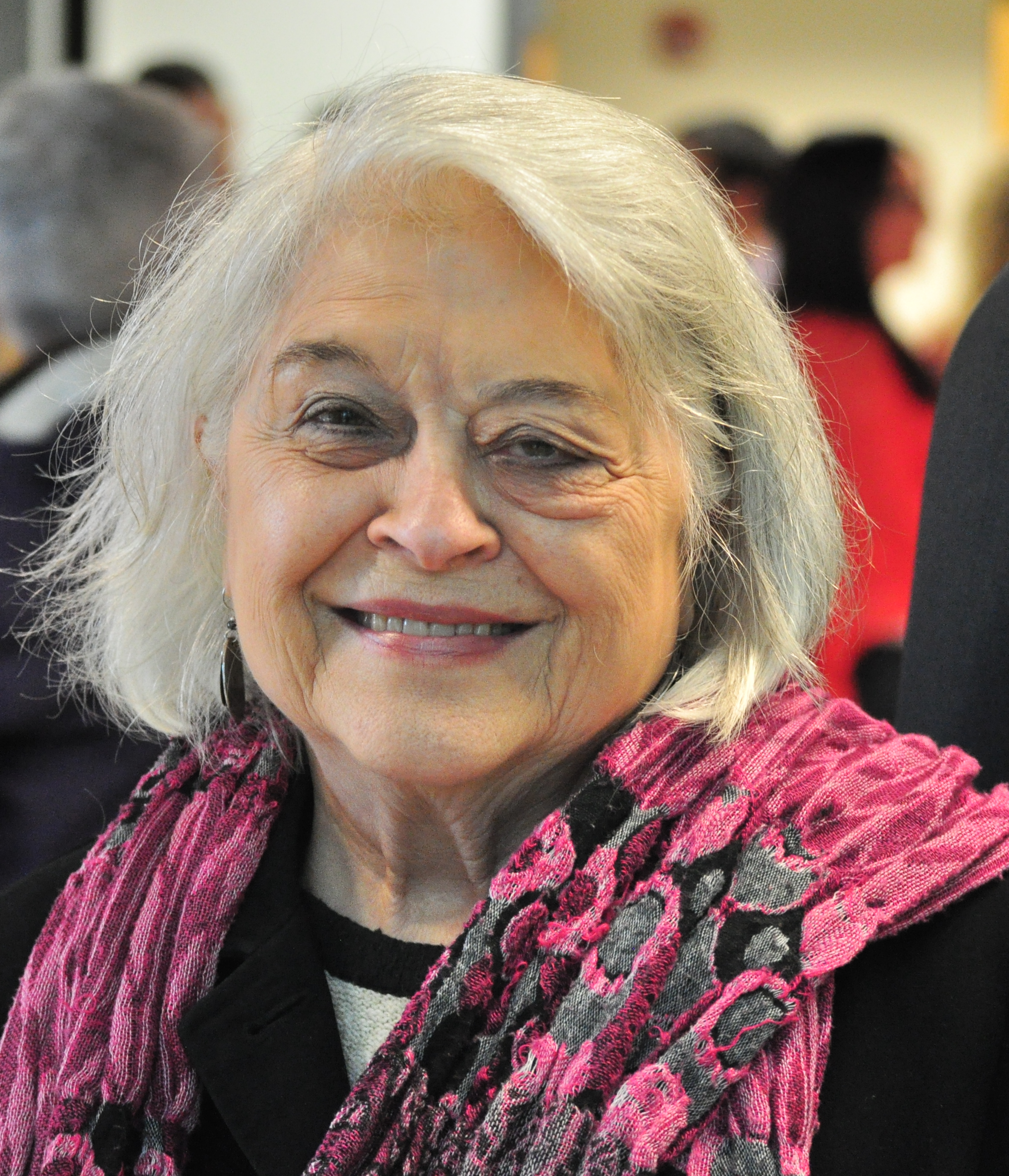
- Kenney in 2013

Member of the Washington House of Representatives from the 46th district
- In office January 13, 1997 – January 14, 2013
- Preceded by: Ken Jacobsen
- Succeeded by: Jessyn Farrell

Personal details
- Born: September 20, 1936 Hardin, Montana, U.S.
- Died: May 13, 2025 (aged 88)
- Party: Democratic

Phyllis Gutiérrez Kenney (September 20, 1936 – May 13, 2025) was an American Democratic politician. She was a member of the Washington House of Representatives, representing the 46th district.

== Life and career ==
Kenney was born in Hardin, Montana on September 20, 1936. In 1996, she ran unsuccessfully for Secretary of State of Washington. In 1997, Governor Mike Lowry appointed her to serve the remainder of Ken Jacobsen's term after Jacobsen's appointment to the Washington State Senate.

Kenney died on May 13, 2025, at the age of 88.
