= David Frockt =

American politician from Washington

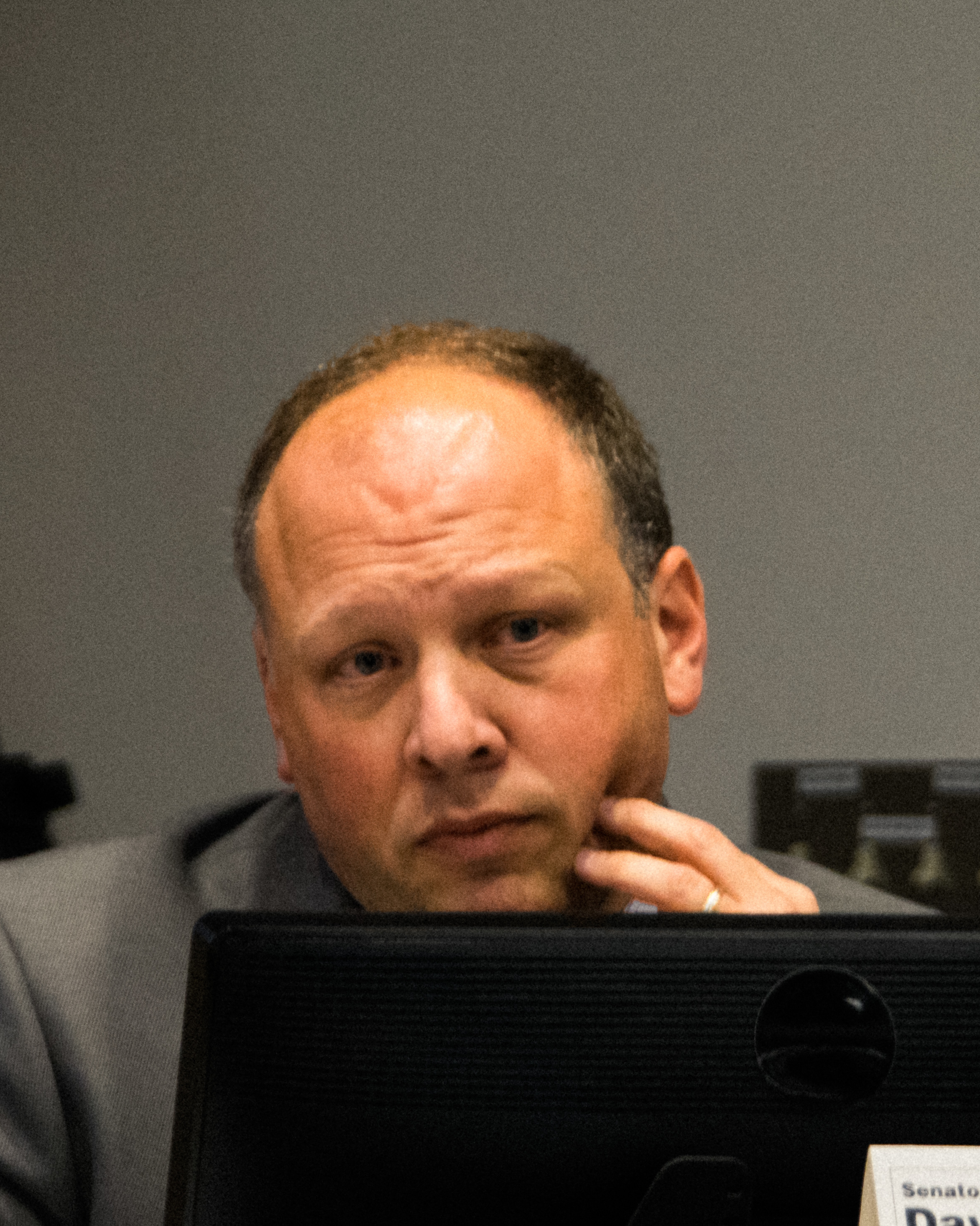
- Frockt in 2017

Member of the Washington Senate from the 46th district
- In office November 14, 2011 – January 9, 2023
- Preceded by: Scott White
- Succeeded by: Javier Valdez

Member of the Washington House of Representatives from the 46th district
- In office January 10, 2011 – November 14, 2011
- Preceded by: Scott White
- Succeeded by: Gerry Pollet

Personal details
- Born: July 14, 1969 (age 57) Cincinnati, Ohio, U.S.
- Party: Democratic
- Spouse: Rebecca Frockt
- Education: University of Pennsylvania (BA); University of California, Los Angeles (JD)
- Website: Official

David S. Frockt (born July 14, 1969) is an American politician and attorney who served as a member of the Washington State Senate for the 46th legislative district, which includes North Seattle, Lake Forest Park, and Kenmore.

== Early life and education ==
Frockt was born in Cincinnati to Jewish parents, Stephen and Madolyn Frockt. He grew up in Louisville, Kentucky and attended Ballard High School. He graduated with honors from the University of Pennsylvania with a B.A. in Political Science in 1991 and later from the UCLA School of Law in 1998.

== Career ==
=== Washington State Legislature ===
David began his career first elected to the Washington State House of Representatives in 2010. In 2011 following the passing of Senator Scott White, the Metropolitan King County Council voted unanimously to appoint David to represent the 46th District in the State Senate. Voters retained him in 2012 to serve the remaining two years of the open Senate term. He was re-elected in 2014 to a full term in the State Senate, winning 80% of the vote. Frockt is currently a member on the Ways & Means, Law & Justice, and Human Services committees. On October 5, 2021, he announced that he would not seek re-election to a fourth term.

==== Education ====
Frockt, as capital budget writer, was instrumental in passing Washington's capital budget in 2018. The budget was $4 billion and included $1 billion for K-12 public schools and $861 million for higher education. Frockt has advocated for fully funding and expanding the WA State Need Grant to increase financial aid for middle-class students seeking higher education. In 2012, Frockt sponsored a bill to provide aid for higher education students to receive student loan counseling in an effort to limit the student debt crisis.

==== Gun Control ====
Frockt has been a prominent advocate in the State Senate for gun control. In the 2017–2018 legislative session, Frockt sponsored and helped pass legislation that banned bump stocks and other trigger modifications in Washington. He also sponsored a bill that added domestic violence to a list of offenses that prohibit the ownership of firearms. In addition, Frockt introduced Senate Bill 6620, which would raise the age for purchasing a semi-automatic rifle from 18 to 21 and enhance the background check system when purchasing a firearm. The bill would also create an emergency response system in schools in the event of an emergency.

== Awards ==
- 2021 City Champion Awards. Presented by Association of Washington Cities (AWC).
