= Janice Niemi =

American politician (1928–2020)

- Janice Niemi, from a 1978 newspaper

Member of the Washington Senate from the 43rd district
- In office September 19, 1987 – January 9, 1995
- Preceded by: Jim McDermott
- Succeeded by: Cal Anderson

Member of the Washington House of Representatives from the 43rd district
- In office January 10, 1983 – September 19, 1987
- Preceded by: Nita Rinehart
- Succeeded by: Cal Anderson

Personal details
- Born: Janice Bell Bailey; September 18, 1928 Rochester, Minnesota, U.S.
- Died: October 21, 2020 (aged 92) Seattle, Washington, U.S.
- Party: Democratic
- Education: University of Michigan (attended); University of Washington (BA, JD)

Janice Niemi (September 18, 1928 – October 21, 2020) was an American lawyer and politician who served in the Washington House of Representatives from the 43rd district from 1983 to 1987 and in the Washington State Senate from the 43rd district from 1987 to 1995.

== Early life and education ==
Janice Bell Bailey was born in Rochester, Minnesota and raised in Spokane, Washington, the daughter of Richard J. Bailey and Norma Anna Bell Bailey. Her father was a doctor. She completed a bachelor's degree in 1950 from the University of Washington, earned a master's degree from the University of Michigan, and one of the first women to graduate from UW's law school. She pursued further studies in Europe in the 1950s.

== Career ==
Bailey worked for the United States State Department in Europe until she married in 1953. She became a district court judge in 1971. She was endorsed by SEAMEC (Seattle Municipal Elections Committee for Gays) in her unsuccessful 1978 run for Congress. She served in the Washington House of Representatives from the 43rd district from 1983 to 1987 and in the Washington State Senate from the 43rd district, from 1987 to 1995. She was one of the founders of the Washington Women Lawyers Association. From 1994 to until her retirement in 2000, she was a judge on the King County Superior Court.

== Personal life ==
Niemi married fellow lawyer Preston Leon Niemi in 1953, and had two children. The Niemis lived in Mexico in the 1960s while he was legal vice consul for the United States in Mexico. They divorced in 1987; Preston Niemi died in 1999. Janice Niemi died on October 21, 2020, in Seattle, Washington, at age 92.
