= Paul Land (politician) =

American politician

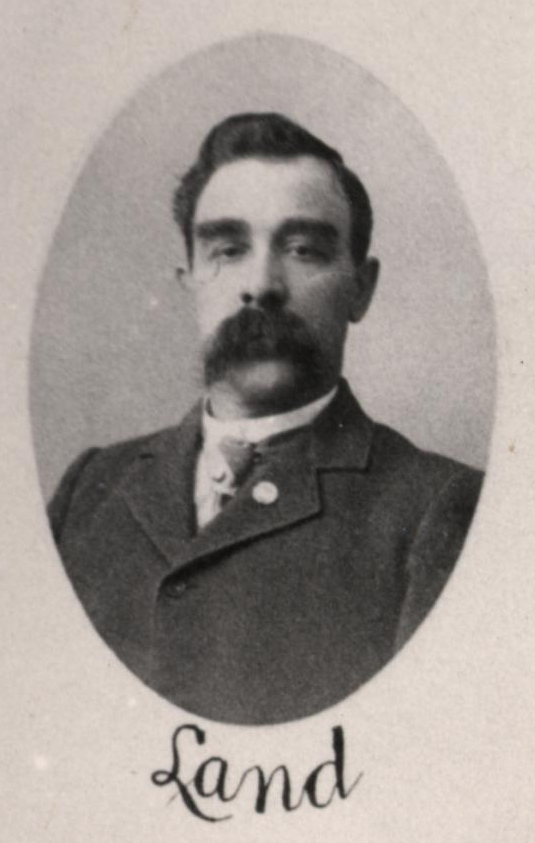
- Land in 1901

Member of the Washington Senate from the 29th district
- In office January 9, 1899 – January 12, 1903
- Preceded by: Virgil A. Pusey
- Succeeded by: Samuel M. LeCrone

Member of the Washington House of Representatives from the 43rd district
- In office January 11, 1897 – January 9, 1899
- Preceded by: Albert Burrows
- Succeeded by: Charles E. Boyce

Personal details
- Born: December 19, 1853 Hamilton, Ontario, Canada
- Died: March 1, 1919 (aged 65) Port Angeles, Washington, U.S.
- Party: Democratic (1901–1919)
- Other political affiliations: Populist (before 1901)

Paul Land (December 19, 1853 – March 1, 1919) was an American politician in the state of Washington. He served in the Washington State Senate and Washington House of Representatives.
