= Jeff Douthwaite =

American politician (1929–2008)

Member of the Washington House of Representatives from the 43rd district
- In office January 13, 1975 – November 7, 1979
- Preceded by: John Rabel
- Succeeded by: Nita Rinehart
- In office January 8, 1973 – January 13, 1975
- Preceded by: Jim McDermott
- Succeeded by: Warren Peterson

Member of the Washington House of Representatives from the 32nd district
- In office January 11, 1971 – January 8, 1973
- Preceded by: Mary Ellen McCaffree
- Succeeded by: Alvin C. Williams

Personal details
- Born: September 7, 1929 Montreal, Quebec, Canada
- Died: September 17, 2008 (aged 79) Seattle, Washington, U.S.
- Party: Democratic

Jeff Douthwaite (September 7, 1929 – September 17, 2008) was an American politician who served in the Washington House of Representatives from 1971 to 1979.

He died of cancer on September 17, 2008, in Seattle, Washington at age 79.
