= Joyale Seafood Restaurant =

Chinese restaurant in Seattle, Washington, U.S.

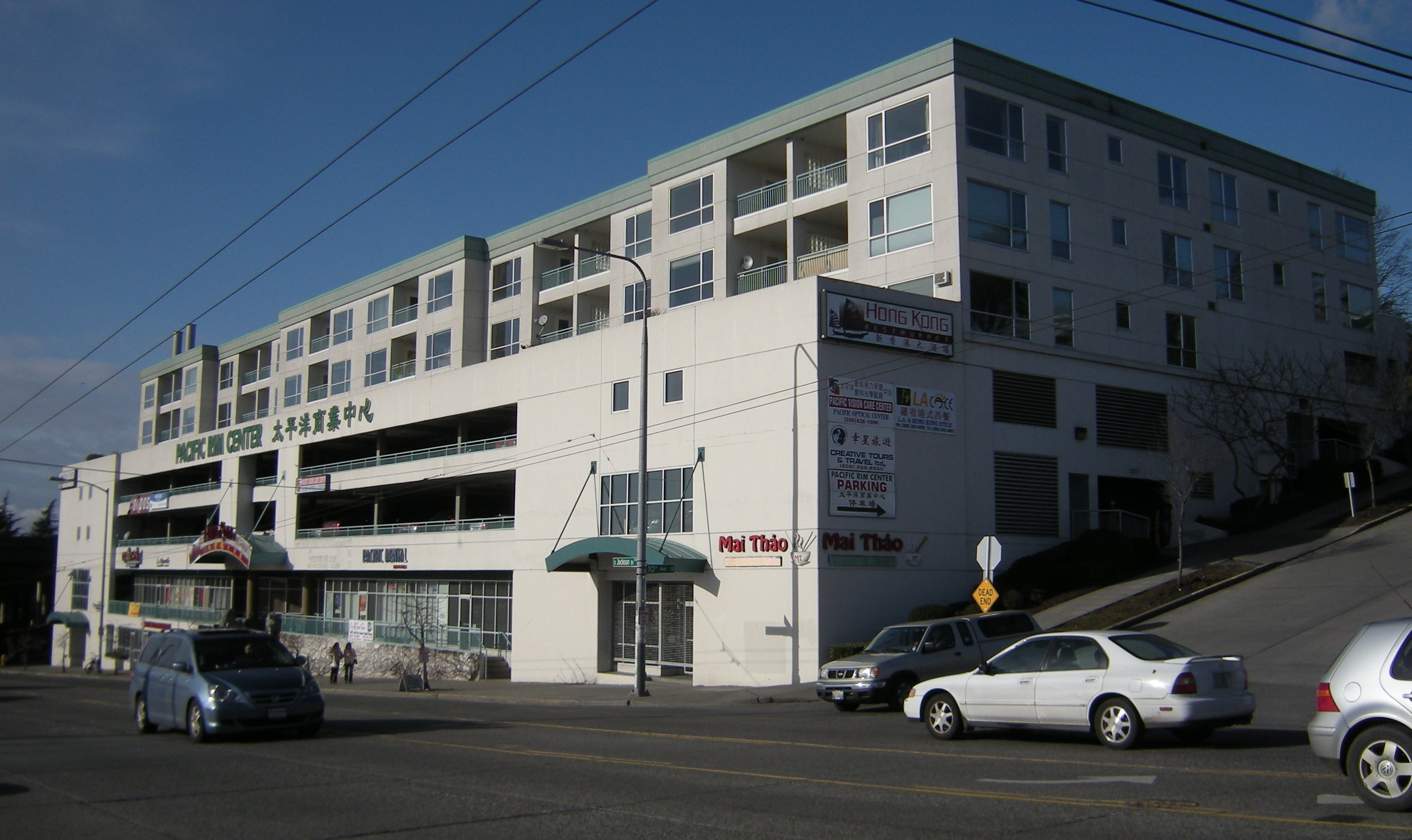
- The restaurant is housed in the Pacific Rim Center (exterior pictured in 2009)
- Interactive map of Joyale Seafood Restaurant

Restaurant information
- Owner: Vincent Zhao
- Food type: Chinese; seafood
- Location: Seattle, King, Washington, United States
- Coordinates: 47°35′58″N 122°19′13″W
- Website: joyaleseattle.com

Joyale Seafood Restaurant is a dim sum and seafood restaurant in Seattle, Washington, United States.

== Description ==
Joyale Seafood Restaurant is housed in the Pacific Rim Center, near the Chinatown–International District. Food options have included congee with century egg, as well as egg tarts and mochi. The restaurant can hold up to 600 people.

== History ==
Vincent Zhao is the owner. Joyale has hosted large parties and other community events, such as graduation and retirement celebrations, as well as Memorial Day gatherings. Politician Tanya Woo had an appreciation party at the restaurant in 2024. Approximately 200 people attended. Business hours were reduced in 2026.

== See also ==
- History of Chinese Americans in Seattle
- List of Chinese restaurants
- List of seafood restaurants
