= Senator Land =

Senator Land may refer to:

- Clay D. Land (born 1960), Georgia State Senate
- John C. Land III (born 1941), South Carolina State Senate
- John Henry Land (1918–2011), Georgia State Senate
- Paul Land (politician) (1853–1919), Washington State Senate
- Ted J. Land (1936–2018), Georgia State Senate
