= Mary McCaffree =

Mary McCaffree may refer to:

- Mary Ellen McCaffree (1918–2014), member of the Washington House of Representatives
- Mary Jane McCaffree (1911–2018), White House Social Secretary during the Eisenhower administration
