= George W. Scott (politician) =

American politician (born 1937)

George William Scott
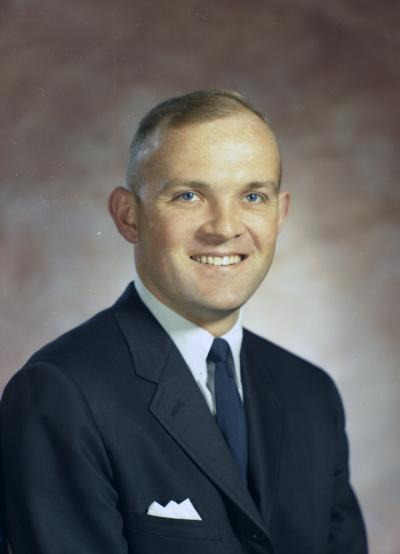
- Scott in 1971

Member of the Washington Senate from the 46th district
- In office January 11, 1971 – January 10, 1983
- Preceded by: John N. Ryder
- Succeeded by: Nita Rinehart

Member of the Washington House of Representatives from the 46th district
- In office January 13, 1969 – January 11, 1971
- Preceded by: Slade Gorton
- Succeeded by: Paul Kraabel

Personal details
- Born: 1937 (age 88–89) Seattle, Washington, U.S.
- Party: Republican
- Education: Whitworth College, University of Washington

George W. Scott (born 1937) is an American former politician in the state of Washington. He was elected to the state House of Representatives from the 46th District in 1968 while a graduate student at the University of Washington. He won the first of three state Senate terms in 1970. Scott would go on to chair the Ways and Means Committee, the Senate's budget writing committee. He did not run for re-election in 1982.

Scott's non-elected career included stints as Assistant to the Dean of the U.W. Medical School, Rainier Bancorporation's vice president for Social Policy, executive director of the Washington State Dental Association, Director of Public Affairs for the Washington State Bar, and as Washington State Archivist. He earned his B.A. in Philosophy at Whitworth College and a Ph.D. in history from the University of Washington. His 1971 Ph.D. dissertation was titled Arthur B. Langlie: Republican Governor in a Democratic Age. He and first wife Carol had one daughter, Courtnay.

Scott is the author of two books, A Majority of One: Legislative Life and Governors of Washington, and the editor of Turning Points in Washington's Public Life.
