= Nita Rinehart =

American politician

Member of the Washington Senate from the 46th district
- In office January 10, 1983 – December 10, 1996
- Preceded by: George W. Scott
- Succeeded by: Ken Jacobsen

Member of the Washington House of Representatives from the 43rd district
- In office November 13, 1979 – January 10, 1983
- Preceded by: Jeff Douthwaite
- Succeeded by: Janice Niemi

Personal details
- Born: December 8, 1940 Texarkana, Texas, U.S.
- Died: July 10, 2024 (aged 83) Seattle, Washington
- Party: Democratic

Nita Rinehart (December 8, 1940 – July 10, 2024) was an American politician who served in the Washington House of Representatives from the 43rd district from 1979 to 1983 and in the Washington State Senate from the 46th district from 1983 to 1996.

She died on July 10, 2024, in Seattle, Washington at age 83.
