= Senator Thibodeau =

Senator Thibodeau may refer to:

- Michael Thibodeau (born 1966), Maine State Senate
- Theresa Thibodeau (born 1975), Nebraska State Senate

== See also ==
- Pat Thibaudeau (1932–2021), Washington State Senate
