= Pat Thibaudeau =

American politician (1932–2021)

Member of the Washington Senate from the 43rd district
- In office October 2, 1995 – January 8, 2007
- Preceded by: Cal Anderson
- Succeeded by: Ed Murray

Member of the Washington House of Representatives from the 43rd district Position 1
- In office January 9, 1995 – October 2, 1995
- Preceded by: Cal Anderson
- Succeeded by: Ed Murray

Member of the Washington House of Representatives from the 43rd district Position 2
- In office January 11, 1993 – January 9, 1995
- Preceded by: Jesse Wineberry
- Succeeded by: Frank Chopp

Personal details
- Party: Democratic
- Spouse: Roger

Patricia Thibaudeau (June 13, 1932 – October 28, 2021) was a politician from the state of Washington whose term as a Washington state senator from Seattle's District 43 expired in January 2007. She declined to run for reelection in 2006 after Ed Murray announced he would challenge her in the primary election for the Democratic nomination.

Thibaudeau, a Democrat, graduated from Whitman College with a BA in Psychology and from Smith College with a master's degree in social work. She was a partner in a governmental relations firm and a state representative before being elected to the Washington State Senate.

Thibaudeau was the vice-chair of the State Senate's Health & Long Term Care Committee, and served on the Judiciary Committee, Human Services & Corrections Committee, Ways & Means Committee, Rules Committee, and Joint Legislative Audit & Review Committee. She also is a member of the Washington State Arts Commission.

Before her appointment to the senate in 1995, she had served in the Washington House of Representatives.

She has two children, Sarah and Steven.

== See also ==
- Washington State Legislature
