= Scott White (politician) =

American politician

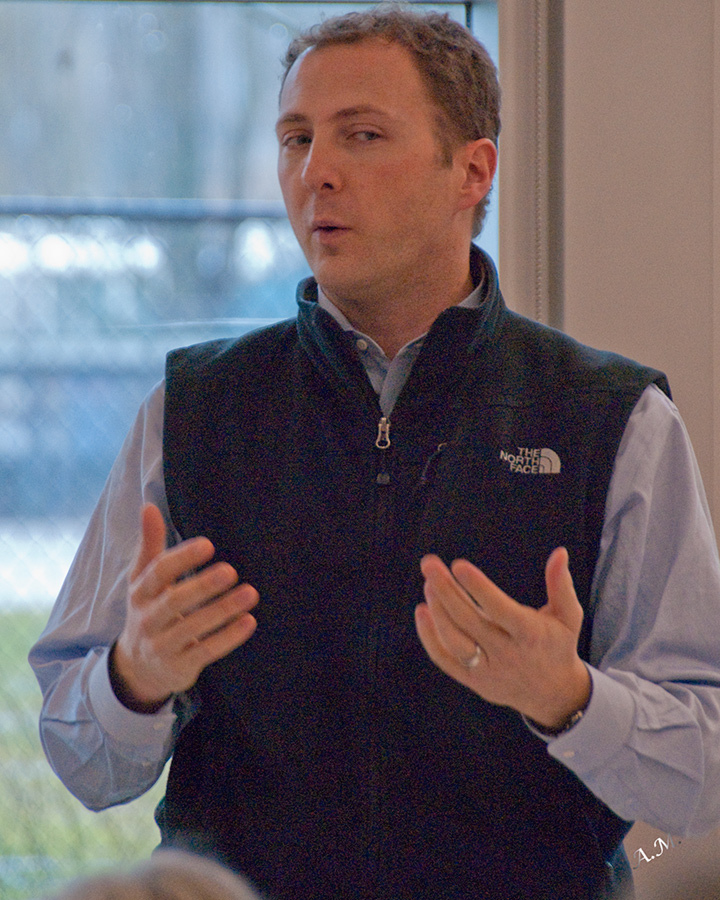
- Scott White, March 2011

Member of the Washington Senate from the 46th district
- In office January 10, 2011 – October 21, 2011
- Preceded by: Ken Jacobsen
- Succeeded by: David Frockt

Member of the Washington House of Representatives from the 46th district
- In office January 12, 2009 – January 10, 2011
- Preceded by: Jim McIntire
- Succeeded by: David Frockt

Personal details
- Born: June 8, 1970 Olympia, Washington, U.S.
- Died: October 21, 2011 (aged 41) Kittitas County, Washington, U.S.
- Party: Democratic
- Spouse: Alison Carl White
- Children: 2
- Education: University of Washington, Western Washington University
- Occupation: Politician

Scott Benton White (June 8, 1970 – October 21, 2011) was an American politician who served as a Democratic member of the Washington State Senate representing the 46th legislative district. His district included much of North Seattle, including the neighborhoods of Northgate, Greenwood, Bitter Lake, Broadview, Haller Lake, Pinehurst, Olympic Hills, Maple Leaf, Lake City, Wedgwood, View Ridge, Laurelhurst, and Windermere.

== Political career ==
White served in a variety of professional and community leadership positions before being elected to the legislature. He was a former Chief of Staff to the Metropolitan King County Council and served as budget and policy staff in both the Washington State Legislature and King County governments. He taught graduate-level courses in public policy at the Daniel J. Evans School of Public Affairs at the University of Washington. In 2004 he was selected as a Marshall Fellow by the German Marshall Fund of the United States. White served on the board of Humanities Washington, the Public Policy Committee of the United Way of King County, and as a grassroots organizer for the Democratic Party.

During his 2011–2012 term, White's assignments in the Senate would have included serving in leadership as Majority Whip, as Vice Chair of the Transportation Committee, and serving on the Higher Education and Rules Committees.

== Personal life ==
A fourth-generation Washingtonian, White lived in the Wedgwood neighborhood of North Seattle with his wife, Alison Carl White, and their two young children.

== Death ==
On October 21, 2011, White was found dead in a hotel room at Suncadia Resort. The coroner's report indicated that the cause was a cardiac problem linked to a previously undiagnosed enlarged heart. A proposal to add White's name to either the Roosevelt or University of Washington light rail stations was passed by the state house in 2015. Sound Transit instead dedicated the plaza at Northgate station for White.
