= Pacific Rim Center =

Shopping mall in Seattle, Washington, U.S.

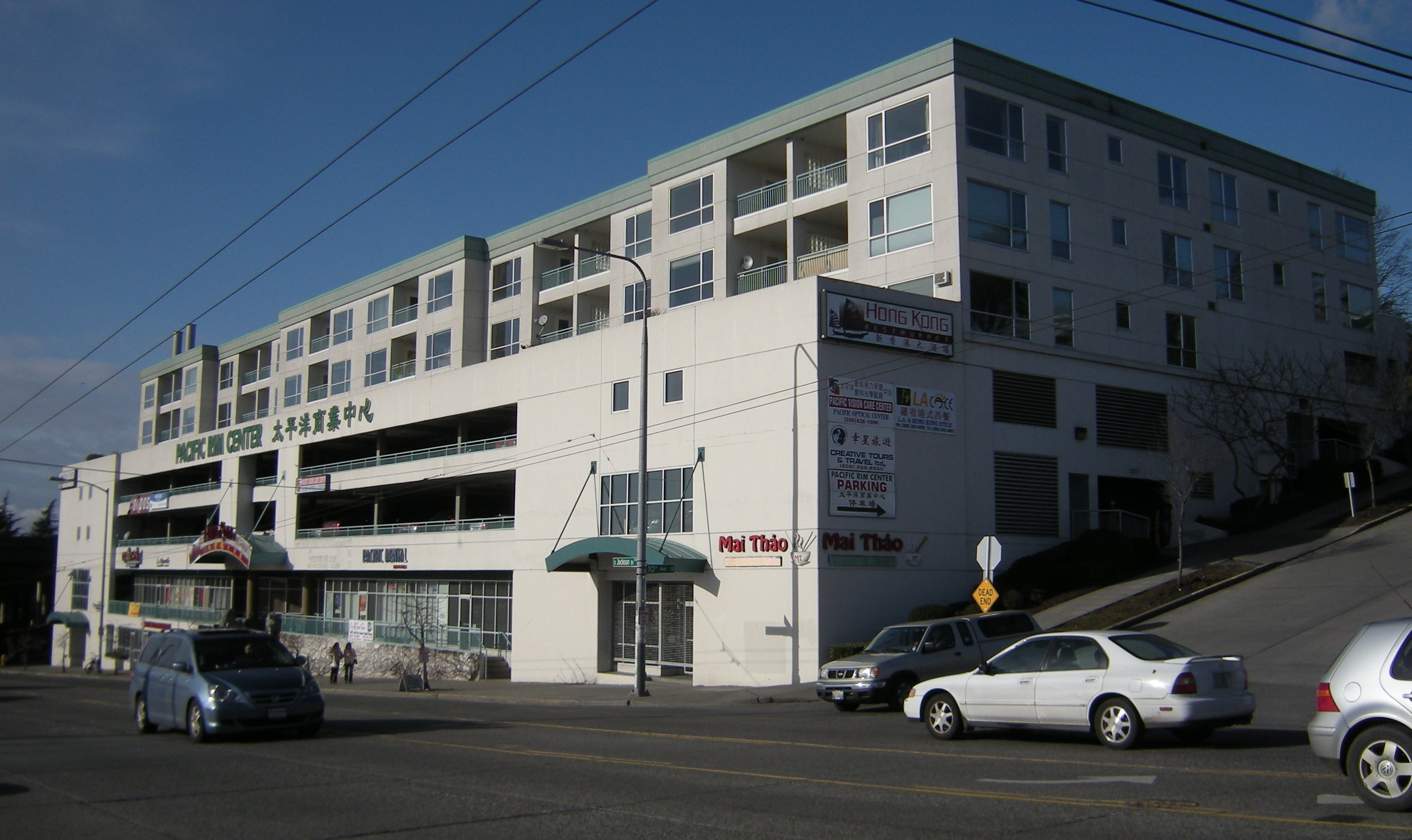
- Exterior, 2009
- Interactive map of Pacific Rim Center
- Location: Seattle, Washington, U.S.
- Coordinates: 47°35′58″N 122°19′13″W

The Pacific Rim Center is a seven-story, mixed-use development in Seattle, Washington, United States. Described as a shopping mall, it has condominiums and retail spaces. The Pacific Rim Center houses Joyale Seafood Restaurant. Other tenants have included Hi B3ar, the Vietnamese restaurant Lan Huê and Sushi Ave.

The Pacific Rim Center was built in 2000 and 2001.
