= Cal Anderson =

American politician (1948–1995)

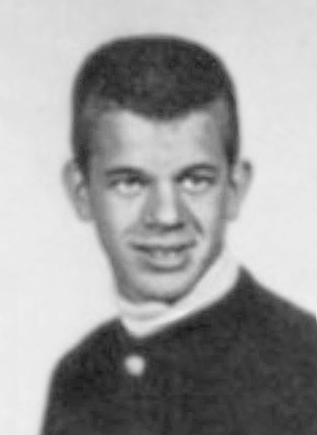
- 1965 high school yearbook photo

Member of the Washington Senate from the 43rd district
- In office January 9, 1995 – August 4, 1995
- Preceded by: Janice Niemi
- Succeeded by: Pat Thibaudeau

Member of the Washington House of Representatives from the 1st Position of the 43rd district
- In office November 9, 1987 – January 9, 1995
- Preceded by: Janice Niemi
- Succeeded by: Pat Thibaudeau

Personal details
- Born: Calvin Bruce Anderson; May 2, 1948 Seattle, Washington, U.S.
- Died: August 4, 1995 (aged 47) Seattle, Washington, U.S.
- Party: Democratic
- Domestic partner: Eric Ishino

Military service
- Branch/service: United States Army
- Unit: 23rd Infantry Division
- Battles/wars: Vietnam War
- Awards: Bronze Stars (2)

Calvin Bruce Anderson (May 2, 1948 – August 4, 1995) was an American military officer and politician who served as a member of the Washington State Senate, representing the 43rd district in 1995. A member of the Democratic Party, he previously served as a member of the Washington House of Representatives from 1987 to 1995, and was the first openly gay member of the Washington State Legislature.

Anderson was born in Seattle, Washington, and educated at Foster High School. He became involved in politics at a young age working for his father's city council campaign and Warren Magnuson's Senate campaign. Following high school he joined the United States Army and worked as a court reporter for the 23rd Infantry Division. He came out as gay to his parents during his time in the military.

He worked for multiple Seattle city officials and held positions in the Young Democrats and Washington State Democratic Party. In 1987, he was selected to fill Representative Janice Niemi's vacant seat in the state house and during his tenure he faced homophobic attacks from a member of the state legislature and in the Democratic primary. Anderson briefly served in the state senate, where he was Assistant Majority Whip, until his death from AIDS in 1995. His memorial was attended by thousands and a park in Seattle was later named after him.

== Early life and education ==
Calvin Bruce Anderson was born in Seattle, Washington, on May 2, 1948, to Robert and Alice Anderson. He volunteered for Warren Magnuson's campaign for a seat in the United States Senate while in middle school. He worked for his father's successful campaign for a seat on the Tukwila, Washington, city council which he won by four votes. Anderson graduated from Foster High School in 1966.

== Career ==
=== Army ===
Anderson served in the United States Army and worked as a court reporter for the 23rd Infantry Division. During his time in the military he received two Bronze Stars for working as the lead court reporter during the Mỹ Lai massacre investigation. During the trial of Ernest Medina he served as a senior court reporter. He served in the Army until 1973. He came out to his parents as homosexual during his time in the military before his father's death in 1971, and his mother stated that "It doesn't bother me; I don't even think about it. I just can't see why people can't live and let live". Anderson stated that he was once caught "in the act" but was only given a short reprimand, with the commander stating "Now, I don't care what people do in their own time, but the Army doesn't feel that way, so in the future, be more discreet".

=== Politics ===
Anderson started working for Jeanette Williams, the chair of the King County Democratic Party after graduating from high school. In 1968, he was appointed to serve as secretary of the South King County Young Democrats. Anderson worked for George Benson, a member of the Seattle city council, from 1975 to 1983, as an administrative assistant. He became an appointments secretary for Mayor Charles Royer in 1983, and worked for him until 1987. During the 1980s he was a member of the Washington State Democratic Party's central committee and was the secretary of the committee.

=== Washington legislature ===
==== Elections ====
Jim McDermott left the Washington State Senate in 1987, to work in the United States Foreign Service. McDermott's vacancy in the state senate was filled by Representative Janice Niemi, a member of the Washington House of Representatives from the 43rd district. Anderson won the most votes, fifty-one out of one hundred sixteen, at the precinct representatives meeting to recommend a person to fill Niemi's vacant seat. He was one of the three nominees, alongside Harvey Muggy and Gene Peterson, considered to replace Niemi. He was selected to fill the vacancy, becoming the first openly gay member of the Washington State Legislature.

During the 1988 election Anderson faced a primary challenge from Debra Wilson Mobley, who was the Seattle city council clerk. He stated that a campaign ad by Mobley that asked "Which one of these candidates for state representative in Position 1 in the 43rd District could I honestly look my kids in the eye and say, 'this is a good role model to follow'?" were "homophobic and gay-bashing". He defeated Mobley in the primary and defeated Republican nominee Lee Carter in the general election. Ed Murray, who later served in the state legislature and as Mayor of Seattle, was Anderson's campaign manager during the 1988 election.

Anderson defeated Mobley and Gary A. Jacobs in the 1990 Democratic primary and defeated Republican nominee James Alonzo in the general election. He defeated Republican nominee Mike Meenen in the 1992 election. Anderson ran for a seat in the state senate after Niemi chose to not seek reelection in 1994; he won the Democratic nomination and defeated Republican nominee Meenen in the general election.

==== Tenure ====
Anderson replaced Representative Mike Todd as chair of the State Government committee after Todd unsuccessfully ran for a seat in the state senate. Anderson was appointed to serve as vice-chair of the Ecology and Parks, and the Law and Justice committees in the state senate. He also served as the Assistant Majority Whip.

Senator A. L. Rasmussen, who was an opponent of gay rights, stated that Anderson was at fault for death threats against him as he "bragged" about being gay. Anderson served as the keynote speaker of the third March for Gay, Lesbian, Bisexual and Transgender Pride parade in 1994.

== Death and legacy ==
Anderson was mostly absent from the state senate due to having non-Hodgkin lymphoma. As the Democratic Party only held a one-seat majority, they were reduced to a tie which allowed the Republicans to take over multiple times with parliamentary rules. Chemotherapy eradicated Anderson's non-Hodgkin lymphoma in April 1995. He served as the grand marshal of the 21st gay pride parade in Seattle, but blood clots in his legs and lungs prevented him attending the parade in June.

Anderson died from AIDS on August 4, 1995, at his home in Seattle. He was discovered by his partner Eric Ishino who later discovered a large file of death threats made against Anderson. Around 2,000 people attended a memorial for Anderson at St. James Cathedral. Pat Thibaudeau was appointed to fill the vacancy created by Anderson's death and filled the remainder of his term which lasted until December 31, 1998. On April 19, 2003, Seattle named Cal Anderson Park after Anderson and the park was opened on September 24, 2005.

== Political positions ==
=== Capital punishment ===
Anderson proposed legislation in the state house that would prohibit the execution of intellectually disabled people which were defined as people with an IQ equal to or below seventy. In 1995, the state senate voted forty-five to three, with Anderson voting against, in favor of legislation which would make the primary method of execution in Washington lethal injection instead of hanging.

=== Euthanasia ===
Anderson proposed legislation to allow the prescription of lethal drugs by doctors to patients who were terminally ill. Following Anderson's death the legislation was brought back by Senator Kevin Quigley.

=== Elections ===
Anderson sponsored legislation in the state house which would automatically register somebody to vote whenever they applied for or renewed their driver license. Anderson sponsored legislation in 1991, which would have Washington use a preference primary for president starting in 1992. In 1991, he joined a lawsuit asking for the Washington Supreme Court to declare a ballot proposition, which proposed term limits for the governor, members of the United States Congress, and members of the state legislature, unconstitutional.

=== Gay rights ===
During Anderson's tenure in the state legislature he introduced gay rights legislation eighteen times until his death in 1995. He sponsored legislation in the state house which would allow gay people to file complaints of housing, hiring, or insurance discrimination to the Washington Human Rights Commission. He sponsored legislation in the state house which would require the collection by police of reports of hate crimes against peopled based on their race, religion, disability, or sexual orientation. Anderson stated that a ballot proposition threatened academic freedom after it was amended to prohibit public colleges from "teaching or promoting homosexuality as a healthy lifestyle".

== Electoral history ==
1988 Washington House of Representatives Position 1 of the 43rd district election
Primary election
Party	Candidate	Votes	%
Democratic	Cal Anderson (incumbent)	8,975	52.96%
Democratic	Debra Wilson Mobley	4,837	28.54%
Republican	Lee Carter	3,134	18.49%
Total votes		16,946	100.00%
General election
Democratic	Cal Anderson (incumbent)	27,084	77.25%
Republican	Lee Carter	7,976	22.75%
Total votes		35,060	100.00%

1990 Washington House of Representatives Position 1 of the 43rd district election
Primary election
Party	Candidate	Votes	%
Democratic	Cal Anderson (incumbent)	5,944	63.60%
Democratic	Debra Wilson Mobley	1,918	20.52%
Republican	James Alonzo	1,125	12.04%
Democratic	Gary A. Jacobs	359	3.84%
Total votes		9,346	100.00%
General election
Democratic	Cal Anderson (incumbent)	17,632	84.30%
Republican	James Alonzo	3,285	15.70%
Total votes		20,917	100.00%

1992 Washington House of Representatives Position 1 of the 43rd district election
Primary election
Party	Candidate	Votes	%
Democratic	Cal Anderson (incumbent)	19,717	79.97%
Republican	Mike Meenen	4,938	20.03%
Total votes		24,655	100.00%
General election
Democratic	Cal Anderson (incumbent)	45,064	81.61%
Republican	Mike Meenen	10,155	18.39%
Total votes		55,219	100.00%

1994 Washington Senate 43rd district primary
Primary election
Party	Candidate	Votes	%
Democratic	Cal Anderson	12,531	76.86%
Republican	Mike Meenen	3,773	23.14%
Total votes		16,304	100.00%
General election
Democratic	Cal Anderson	29,722	79.72%
Republican	Mike Meenen	7,561	20.28%
Total votes		37,283	100.00%

== See also ==
- List of first openly LGBT politicians in the United States
