= Gerry Pollet =

American lawyer and politician

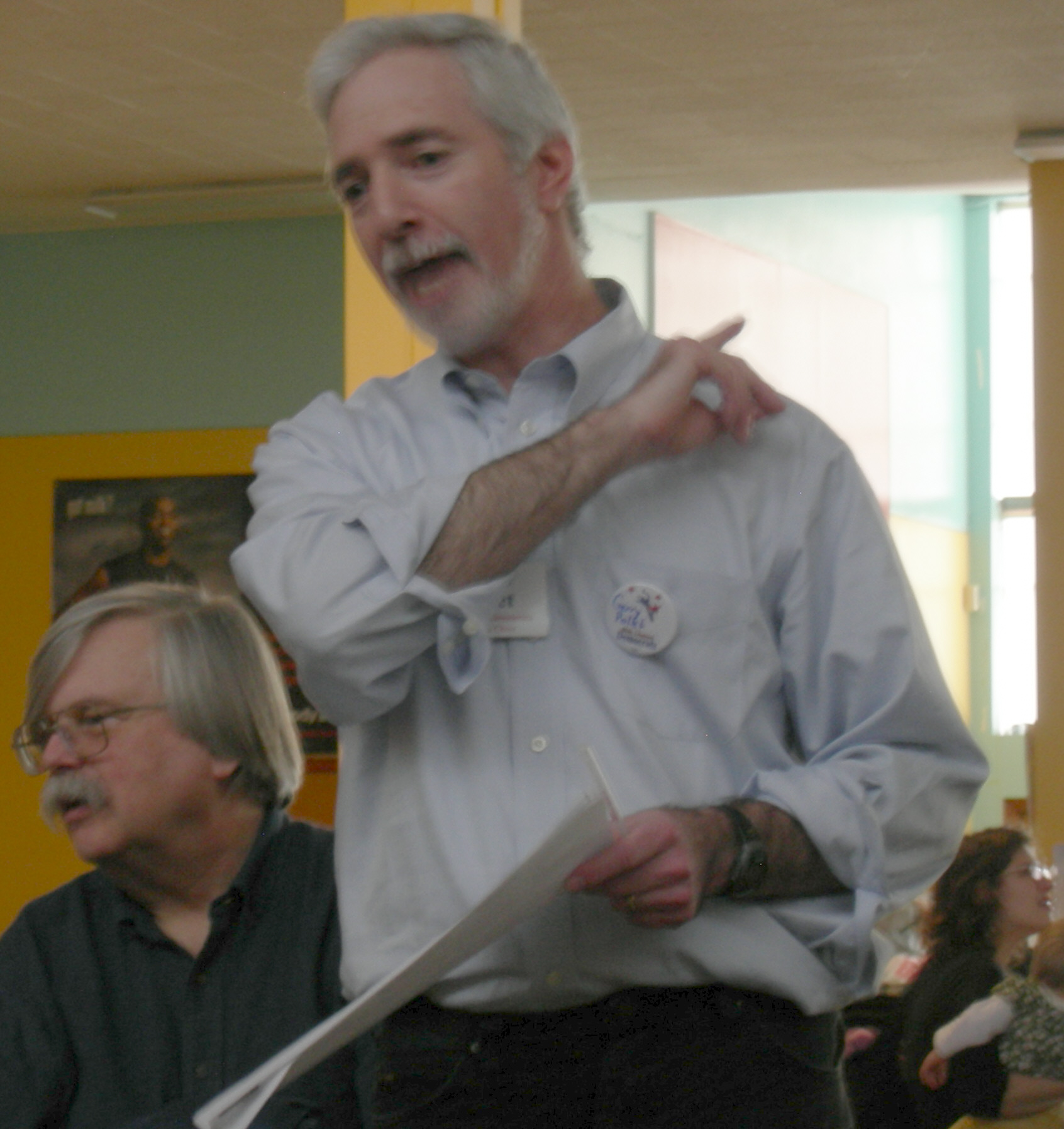

Member of the Washington House of Representatives from the 46th district
- Incumbent
- Assumed office December 5, 2011 Serving with Darya Farivar
- Preceded by: David Frockt

Personal details
- Born: Gerald Martin Pollet; 1958 (age 67–68) New York, U.S.
- Party: Democratic
- Education: University of Washington School of Law (JD)
- Profession: lawyer, environmental activist
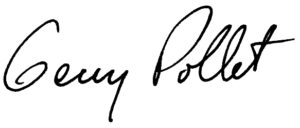
- Signature

Gerald Martin Pollet (born 1958) is a lawyer and a Democratic member of the Washington House of Representatives, representing the 46th District. He lost the race for that seat in 2008 to Scott White, but was appointed to fill the seat December 5, 2011 after Rep. David Frockt, who was elected in 2010, moved over to the Washington State Senate to replace White, who had shifted to the senate in the 2010 election, then died in office.

At the time of his appointment to the legislature, Pollet was serving as executive director of Heart of America Northwest, a watchdog group focused on the Hanford Nuclear Reservation cleanup. He has also been an officer of the state Coalition for Open Government, working there with former Republican state legislator Toby Nixon.
