= Alexis Mercedes Rinck =

American politician

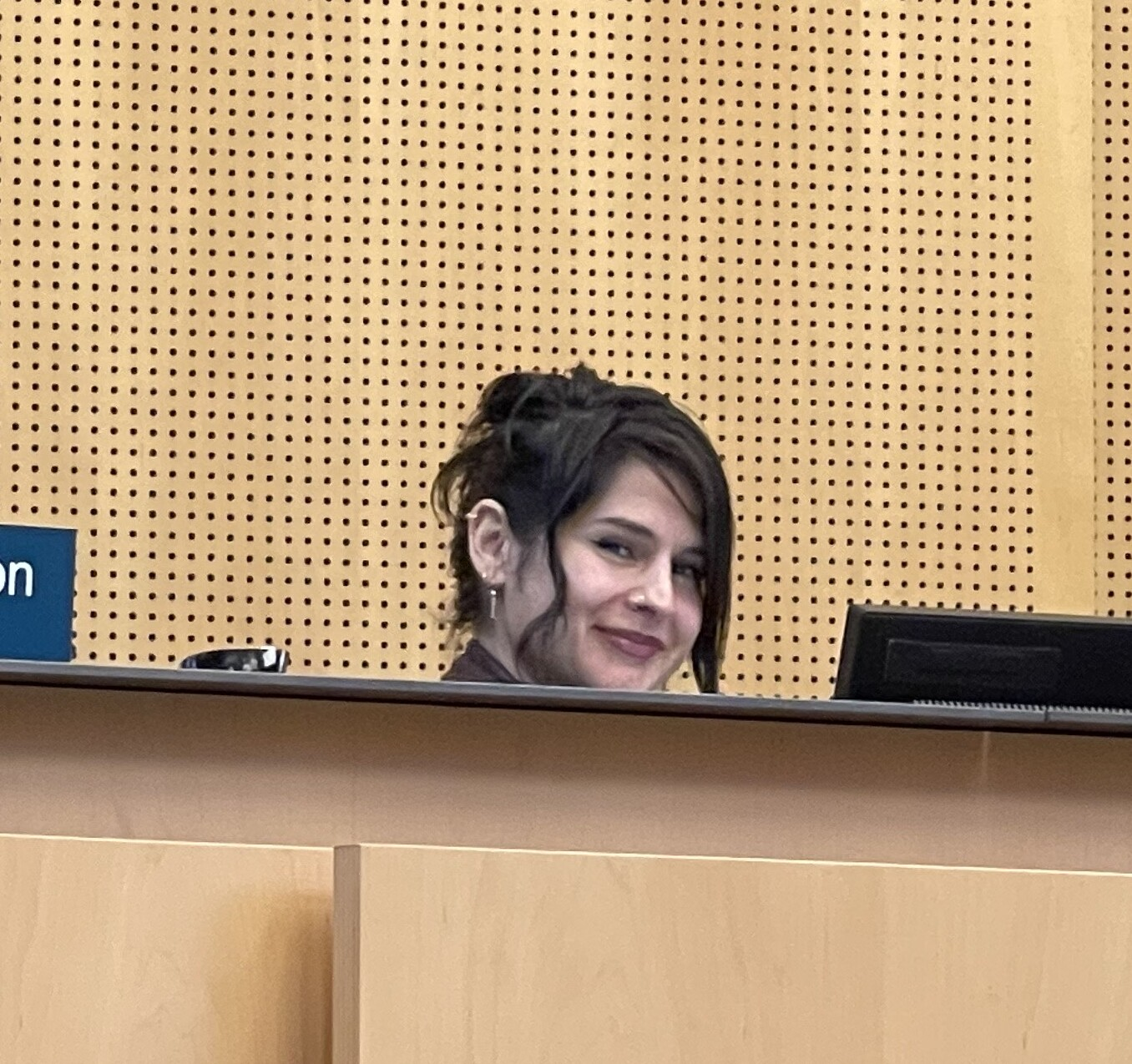
- Rinck in 2025

Member of the Seattle City Council for Position 8
- Incumbent
- Assumed office November 26, 2024
- Preceded by: Tanya Woo

Personal details
- Born: 1995 (age 30–31) Pacifica, California, United States
- Party: Democratic
- Other political affiliations: Working Families Party
- Education: Syracuse University (BA); University of Washington (MPA)

Alexis Mercedes Rinck (born 1995) is an American politician who has served as an at-large member of the Seattle City Council since November 2024. A member of the Democratic Party, she defeated incumbent appointed Councilmember Tanya Woo in the 2024 Seattle City Council special election.

== Early life and education ==
Rinck was born in Pacifica, California to teenage parents who met in a gang and was primarily raised by her grandparents. She attended Syracuse University where she earned her Bachelor's degree in political science and sociology, and while in school she was a community organizer and fundraiser for Planned Parenthood. She then moved to Seattle to attend the University of Washington Evans School of Public Policy and Governance and worked as a waitress while at school.

After graduating, Rinck was a policy analyst for the Sound Cities Association before becoming Director of Sub-Regional Planning and Equitable Engagement at the King County Regional Homelessness Authority (KCRHA). While at the KCRHA, she developed the multi-jurisdictional five-year plan focusing on spending money to address homelessness on a regional scale. Before running for office, Rinck worked at the University of Washington as an assistant director of policy planning and state operations.

== Seattle City Council ==
=== 2024 election ===
In January 2024, Teresa Mosqueda resigned her city-wide District 8 seat on the Seattle City Council after being elected to the King County Council. Community activist Tanya Woo was appointed to the seat until the November 2024 special election. Whoever won that election would only serve until December 2025, when the original term expired. and would have to run for reelection in November 2025. Rinck became the first of Woo's four challengers, focusing her campaign on evidence-based solutions and solving the city's budget deficit through progressive taxes.

In the August primary, Rinck came in first with 50.18%, with Woo coming in second with 38.38%. During a September debate, Rinck criticized Woo and the council for approving the Stay Out of Drug Area (SODA) and Stay Out of Areas of Prostitution (SOAP) areas in the city and not funding social services with progressive taxes. Woo defended the legislation saying the zones would help address public safety issues in high-crime areas, and criticized Rinck for the high cost of the five-year plan Rinck shepherded while at the KCRHA.

In the general election, Rinck won with 58% of the vote to Woo's 41%, earning the greatest number of votes ever cast for an elected official at the city level. She took office on November 26, following certification of the election.

=== 2025 election ===
Rinck announced her reelection campaign in February 2025 for a full term on the council. She drew four challengers for the primary, which included Republican Rachael Savage, Bishop Ray Rogers, and Cascade Party of Washington board member Jesse James. In the August primary, Rinck came in first in a landslide, with 78% of the vote, and advanced to the general election with Savage, who earned 13%. Of the four city-wide incumbents running for reelection, Rinck was the only one to come in first in the primary.

In the general election, Rinck and Savage were on opposite sides of nearly every issue. Rinck supported a housing-first approach to addressing homelessness and a public safety plan focused on police, emergency medical services, and behavioral health specialists. Savage ran on amending the law to allow police to arrest drug addicts, supported working with the Trump Administration, and criticized Rinck for her support of the housing-first model. In the general election, Rinck defeated Savage in a landslide, 82% to 18%.

=== Tenure ===
In February 2025, Rinck's first substantive action in office was the creation of the Select Committee on Federal Administration and Policy Changes, which focuses on the city's response to impacts from the Trump Administration.

In June 2025, Rinck and Mayor Bruce Harrell announced a reworking of the city's Business and Operations tax to raise revenues by taxing large corporations while eliminating the tax on small businesses. In August 2025, the city council unanimously passed the proposal which will be before the voters for final approval in the November general election. In the November general election, voters overwhelmingly passed the proposition with 71% voting yes.

In March 2026, the city council unanimously passed two of Rinck's bills aimed at curbing the Trump administration's immigration enforcement activities in the city. One bill created a 1-year moratorium on new detention centers, the other would mandate a 60-day pause of city surveillance technology if used for civil immigration enforcement and/or threatens a citizen's access to reproductive justice or gender-affirming care.

In September 2026, two pieces of legislation sponsored by Rinck passed the city council. The first bill, passed unanimously, made polyamorous and asexual people a protected class. The second bill, passed 7-2, banned AI-based survillance pricing in grocecy stores, a first in the United States.

== Electoral history ==
=== 2024 election ===
Seattle City Council Position 8, Primary Election 2024
Party	Candidate	Votes	%
Nonpartisan	Alexis Mercedes Rinck	99,394	50.18%
Nonpartisan	Tanya Woo	76,008	38.38%
Nonpartisan	Saunatina Sanchez	8,621	4.35%
Nonpartisan	Tariq Yusuf	7,521	3.80%
Nonpartisan	Saul Patu	5,958	3.01%
Nonpartisan	Write-in	554	0.28%
Turnout		209,652	43.19%
Registered electors		485,426	

Seattle City Council Position 8, General Election 2024
Party	Candidate	Votes	%
Nonpartisan	Alexis Mercedes Rinck	215,642	58.24%
Nonpartisan	Tanya Woo	153,146	41.36%
Nonpartisan	Write-in	1,491	0.40%
Turnout		420,495	83.97%
Registered electors		500,782	

=== 2025 election ===
Seattle City Council Position 8, Primary Election 2025
Party	Candidate	Votes	%
Nonpartisan	Alexis Mercedes Rinck	142,537	78.29%
Nonpartisan	Rachel Savage	23,609	12.97%
Nonpartisan	Ray A. Rogers	8,138	4.47%
Nonpartisan	Jesse A. James	4,339	2.38%
Nonpartisan	Cooper Hall	2,306	1.27%
Nonpartisan	Write-in	1,139	0.63%
Turnout		198,071	39.50%
Registered electors		501,438	

Seattle City Council Position 8, General Election 2025
Party	Candidate	Votes	%
Nonpartisan	Alexis Mercedes Rinck	207,892	81.41%
Nonpartisan	Rachel Savage	46,266	18.12%
Nonpartisan	Write-in	1,214	0.48%
Turnout		280,375	55.48%
Registered electors		505,393	
