= 1996 Washington Secretary of State election =

- November 5, 1996
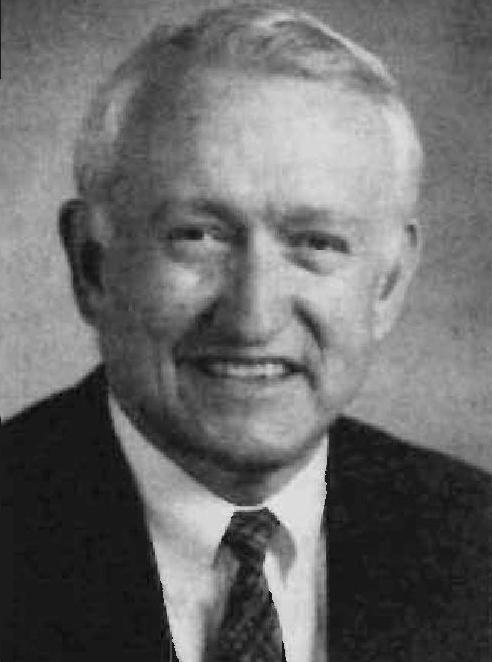

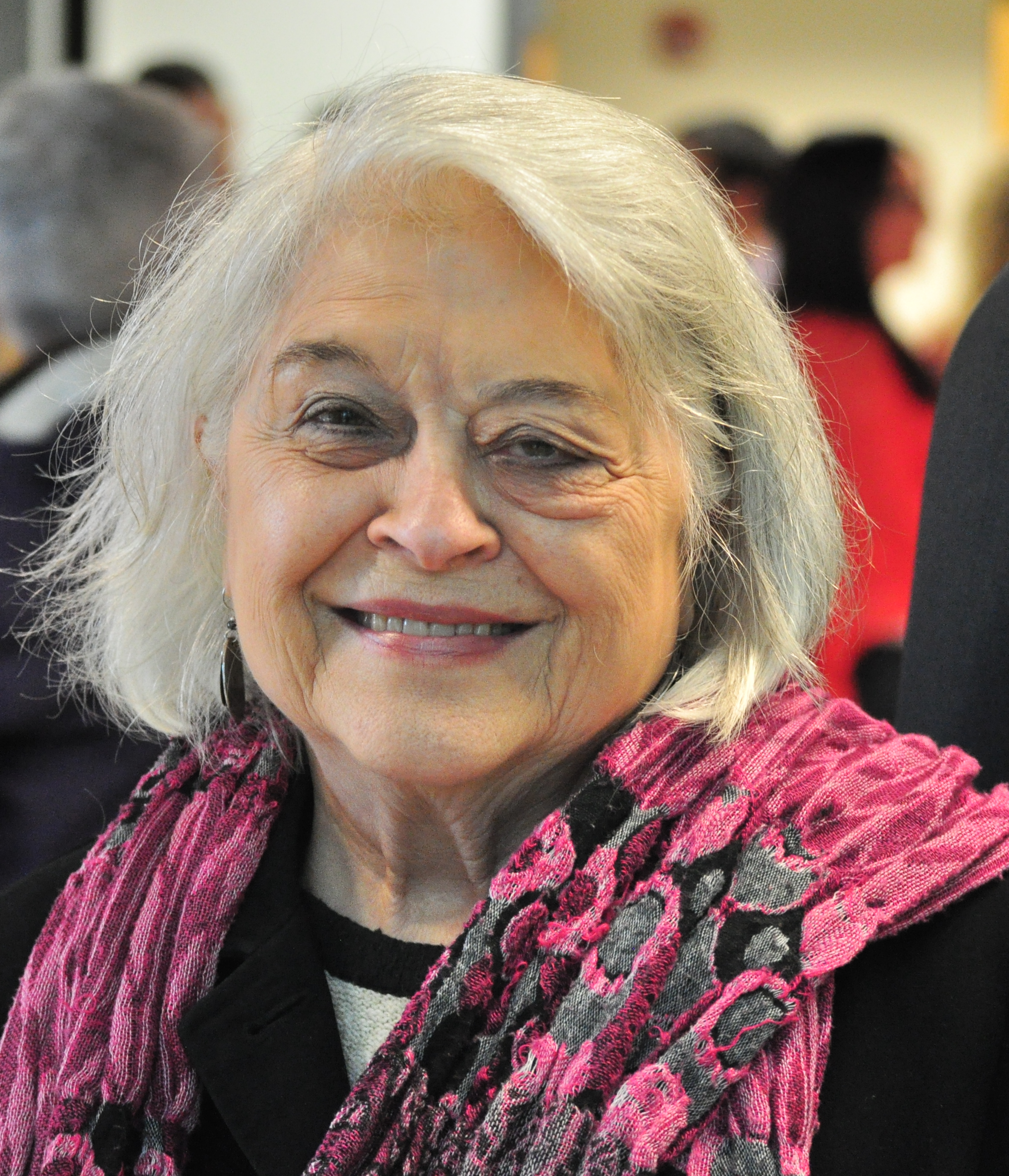
Nominee	Ralph Munro	Phyllis Gutiérrez Kenney
Party	Republican	Democratic
Popular vote	1,223,769	838,632
Percentage	57.30%	39.27%
- County results Munro: 40–50% 50–60% 60–70% Kenney: 40–50%
Secretary of State before election
Ralph Munro
Republican
Elected Secretary of State
Ralph Munro
Republican

The 1996 Washington Secretary of State election took place on November 5, 1996. Incumbent secretary of state Ralph Munro was re-elected.

== Primary election ==
The primary election took place in September, with Republican incumbent Ralph Munro running unopposed. Natural Law candidate Gary Gill and Democratic candidate Phyllis Gutiérrez Kenney were also uncontested for their parties nominations.

== General election ==
In the general election, Munro coasted to victory over Kenney and Gill.

Kenney, at the time of the election, was serving as a member of the board of trustees of the Seattle community college district. Owing to the relative efficiency of her campaign against the long-serving and affable incumbent Munro (described by the Associated Press at the time as "possibly the GOP's most popular officeholder" in Washington), governor Mike Lowry appointed Kenney to a vacant seat in the Washington House of Representatives following her defeat.

=== Results ===
1996 Washington Secretary of State election
Party	Candidate	Votes	%	±%
Republican	Ralph Munro (incumbent)	1,223,769	57.30%	+1.16%
Democratic	Phyllis Gutiérrez Kenney	838,632	39.27%	–1.48%
Natural Law	Gary Gill	73,229	3.43%	N/A
Total votes		2,281,219	100.00%	N/A
Republican hold				

==== By county ====
County results
County	Ralph Munro Republican		Phyllis Gutiérrez Kenney Democratic		Gary Gill Natural Law		Margin		Total votes
County	#	%	#	%	#	%	#	%	Total votes
Adams	2,917	66.74%	1,324	30.29%	130	2.97%	1,593	36.44%	4,371
Asotin	3,467	50.49%	3,097	45.10%	303	4.41%	370	5.39%	6,867
Benton	33,045	64.60%	16,490	32.24%	1,618	3.16%	16,555	32.36%	51,153
Chelan	15,747	69.95%	6,068	26.95%	697	3.10%	9,679	42.99%	22,512
Clallam	16,709	60.03%	10,076	36.20%	1,051	3.78%	6,633	23.83%	27,836
Clark	58,403	54.78%	44,256	41.51%	3,948	3.70%	14,147	13.27%	106,607
Columbia	1,167	62.98%	640	34.54%	46	2.48%	527	28.44%	1,853
Cowlitz	15,755	49.69%	14,899	46.99%	1,052	3.32%	856	2.70%	31,706
Douglas	7,089	68.30%	2,976	28.67%	314	3.03%	4,113	39.63%	10,379
Ferry	1,470	55.53%	1,058	39.97%	119	4.50%	412	15.56%	2,647
Franklin	7,285	61.15%	4,295	36.05%	333	2.80%	2,990	25.10%	11,913
Garfield	772	64.12%	403	33.47%	29	2.41%	369	30.65%	1,204
Grant	13,378	64.18%	6,761	32.44%	705	3.38%	6,617	31.75%	20,844
Grays Harbor	12,841	52.05%	10,998	44.58%	830	3.36%	1,843	7.47%	24,669
Island	16,286	60.50%	9,621	35.74%	1,012	3.76%	6,665	24.76%	26,919
Jefferson	7,026	52.28%	5,852	43.54%	561	4.17%	1,174	8.74%	13,439
King	374,425	54.18%	290,682	42.06%	25,977	3.76%	83,743	12.12%	691,084
Kitsap	54,894	61.90%	31,276	35.27%	2,506	2.83%	23,618	26.63%	88,676
Kittitas	7,451	62.38%	4,115	34.45%	378	3.16%	3,336	27.93%	11,944
Klickitat	3,362	52.08%	2,840	44.00%	253	3.92%	522	8.09%	6,455
Lewis	17,115	65.44%	8,074	30.87%	963	3.68%	9,041	34.57%	26,152
Lincoln	3,160	66.11%	1,485	31.07%	135	2.82%	1,675	35.04%	4,780
Mason	11,685	58.39%	7,581	37.88%	745	3.72%	4,104	20.51%	20,011
Okanogan	7,293	59.99%	4,248	34.94%	616	5.07%	3,045	25.05%	12,157
Pacific	4,064	47.32%	4,193	48.82%	331	3.85%	-129	-1.50%	8,588
Pend Oreille	2,535	53.90%	1,967	41.82%	201	4.27%	568	12.08%	4,703
Pierce	130,940	57.58%	89,698	39.45%	6,762	2.97%	41,242	18.14%	227,400
San Juan	3,674	53.46%	2,826	41.12%	372	5.41%	848	12.34%	6,872
Skagit	22,702	58.20%	14,808	37.96%	1,500	3.85%	7,894	20.24%	39,010
Skamania	1,769	50.66%	1,544	44.22%	179	5.13%	225	6.44%	3,492
Snohomish	120,005	56.92%	84,243	39.96%	6,589	3.13%	35,762	16.96%	210,837
Spokane	87,131	57.07%	61,495	40.28%	4,057	2.66%	25,636	16.79%	152,683
Stevens	9,570	61.58%	5,297	34.08%	675	4.34%	4,273	27.49%	15,542
Thurston	55,395	65.79%	25,884	30.74%	2,925	3.47%	29,511	35.05%	84,204
Wahkiakum	927	54.95%	696	41.26%	64	3.79%	231	13.69%	1,687
Walla Walla	11,331	61.51%	6,561	35.62%	529	2.87%	4,770	25.89%	18,421
Whatcom	35,319	58.07%	23,116	38.00%	2,390	3.93%	12,203	20.06%	60,825
Whitman	8,635	58.87%	5,574	38.00%	460	3.14%	3,061	20.87%	14,669
Yakima	37,030	61.19%	21,615	35.72%	1,874	3.10%	15,415	25.47%	60,519
Totals	1,223,769	57.30%	838,632	39.27%	73,229	3.43%	385,137	18.03%	2,135,630

Counties that flipped from Democratic to Republican

- Asotin (largest city: Clarkston)
- Cowlitz (largest city: Longview)
- Skamania (largest city: Carson)
