= Archibald F. Withrow =

American politician

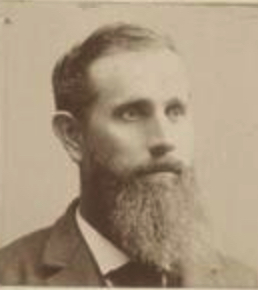

Member of the Virginia House of Delegates for Alleghany, Bath, and Highland
- In office December 1, 1897 – December 6, 1899
- Preceded by: William A. Rinehart
- Succeeded by: William M. McAllister
- In office December 2, 1891 – December 4, 1895
- Preceded by: John T. Byrd
- Succeeded by: William A. Rinehart

Personal details
- Born: Archibald Finley Withrow; January 19, 1848
- Died: April 4, 1927 (aged 79)
- Party: Democratic
- Spouse: Mattie Cummings

Archibald Finley Withrow (January 19, 1848 – April 4, 1927) was an American Democratic politician who served as a member of the Virginia House of Delegates.
