= Ed Murray (Washington politician) =

American politician from Washington

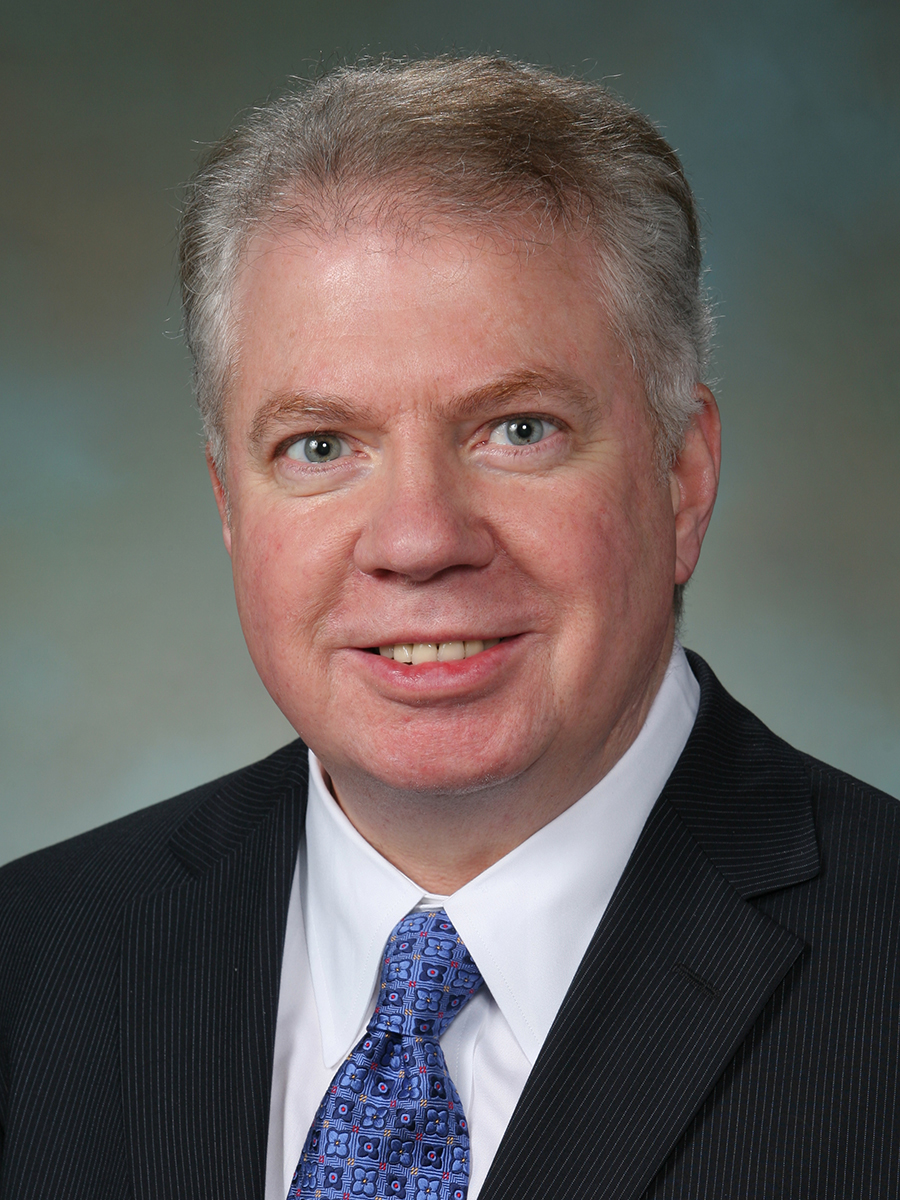
- Official portrait, 2011

Mayor of Seattle
- In office January 1, 2014 – September 13, 2017
- Preceded by: Michael McGinn
- Succeeded by: Bruce Harrell (acting)

Minority Leader of the Washington Senate
- In office December 10, 2012 – December 16, 2013
- Preceded by: Mike Hewitt
- Succeeded by: Sharon Nelson

Member of the Washington Senate from the 43rd district
- In office January 8, 2007 – December 16, 2013
- Preceded by: Pat Thibaudeau
- Succeeded by: Jamie Pedersen

Member of the Washington House of Representatives from the 43rd district
- In office November 4, 1995 – January 8, 2007
- Preceded by: Pat Thibaudeau
- Succeeded by: Jamie Pedersen

Personal details
- Born: Edward Bernard Patrick Murray; May 2, 1955 (age 71) Aberdeen, Washington, U.S.
- Party: Democratic
- Spouse: Michael Shiosaki (m. 2013)
- Education: University of Portland (BA)

Edward Bernard Patrick Murray (born May 2, 1955) is an American politician from the state of Washington who most recently served as the 53rd mayor of Seattle from 2014 to 2017. A Democrat, he was previously a state legislator, first with the Washington State House of Representatives from 1996 to 2007, then the Washington State Senate from 2007 to 2013.

In 2017, Murray faced multiple allegations of child abuse, rape and sexual molestation, including from a family member and his adopted son. He denies the allegations. Murray resigned as mayor of Seattle on September 12, 2017.

== Early life and education ==
Murray was born in Aberdeen, Washington, to an Irish Catholic family, and is one of seven siblings in his family. He spent much of his childhood in West Seattle's Alki neighborhood, but attended high school at Timberline High School in Lacey, where he served as student body president.

Murray graduated from the University of Portland in 1980; he majored in sociology.

== Political career ==
Murray began his career doing pretrial work for public defenders in Portland. He then returned to Seattle, becoming a paralegal, and quickly became active in local politics there. He was campaign manager for Cal Anderson, the first openly gay legislator in Washington state, in 1988 before becoming an assistant to City Councilmember Martha Choe. Murray later managed a nonprofit focused on gay rights.

=== Early start ===
In 1995, Murray, a Democrat, ran to fill the state Senate seat left vacant by the death of Anderson, his mentor. Murray was defeated by state Representative Pat Thibaudeau, but was then appointed to fill Thibaudeau's vacant state House seat in the 43rd Legislative District. He was reelected biennially until 2006, when he opted not to run for reelection to the House. The 43rd district, entirely within Seattle, includes the University District, Montlake, Eastlake, and Capitol Hill neighborhoods. The district is very progressive and reliably Democratic.

In 2006, Murray announced his intention to challenge Thibaudeau for the 43rd District seat in the State Senate. In May 2006, Thibaudeau dropped out and Murray was elected to the Senate with little opposition. He took his senate seat in January 2007. In his first session in the senate (2007–08), he was appointed vice chair of the majority caucus and in the 2009–10 session, he served as caucus chair, a post that largely is in charge of budget for the Senate and other housekeeping matters. After being reelected unopposed in 2010, Murray was appointed chair of the Ways & Means Committee for 2011–12.

Murray previously served as chair of the House Transportation Committee. He was also active in advancing LGBT rights. He led the push for an anti-discrimination law barring businesses from discriminating against gays and lesbians, a measure that finally passed in 2006 after three decades of debate. He was also the main sponsor of legislation creating domestic partnerships, approved in 2007.

In 2009, Murray was the prime sponsor of a $2.4 billion Washington Senate financing bill authorizing the construction of a deep-bore tunnel underneath Seattle to replace the Alaskan Way Viaduct. Murray advocated for the project, which attracted well-documented concerns. Bertha, the machine drilling the deep-bore tunnel, broke down in December 2013, leading to costly delays and significant challenges such as destabilizing soil conditions under Seattle's historic Pioneer Square and the Viaduct itself. As of mid-2018, cost overruns on the tunnel project exceed $600 million.

=== Mayoral career ===
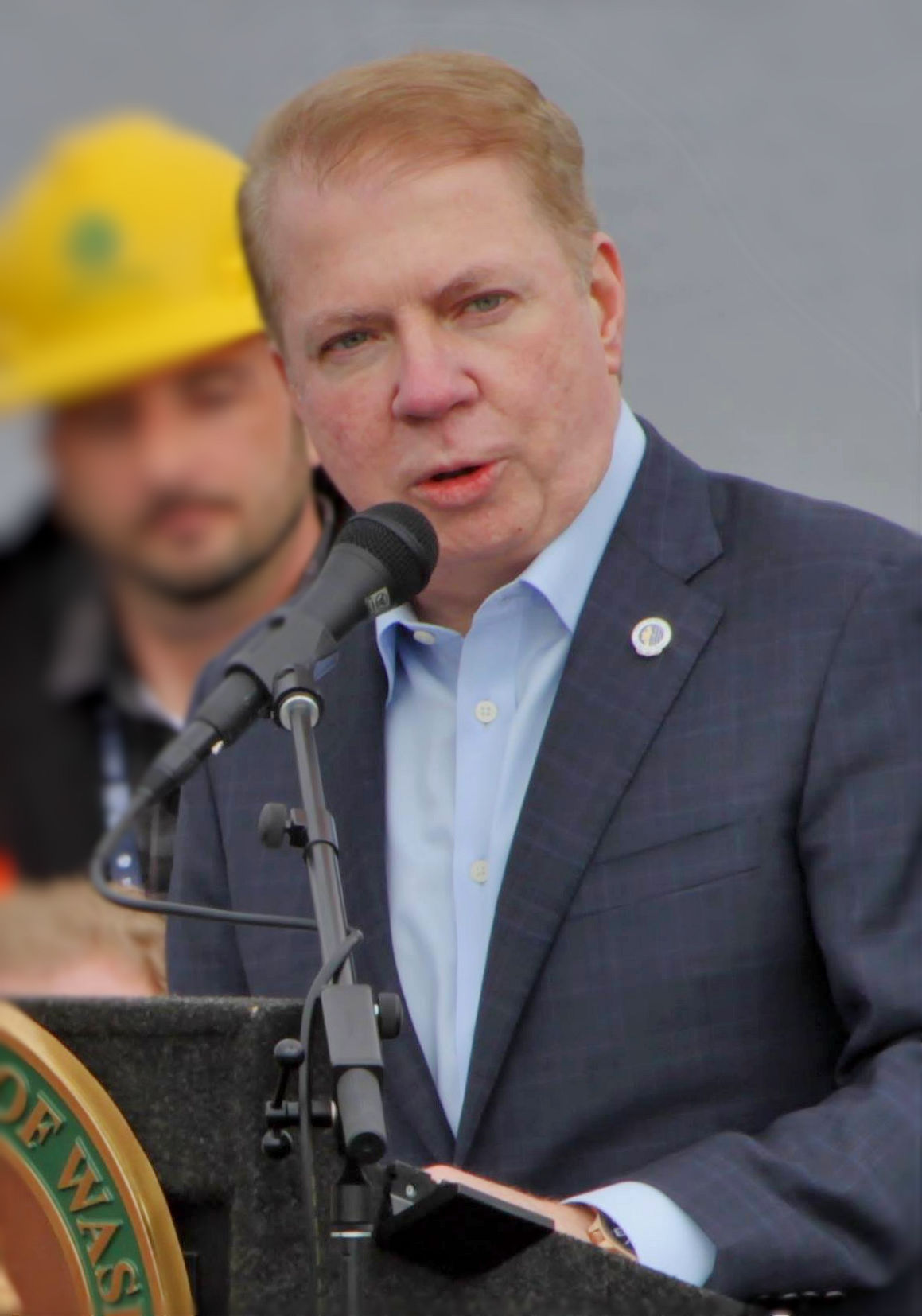
Murray speaking in 2016

Murray was elected mayor of Seattle in 2013. He ran for reelection in 2017, but ended his campaign on May 9 amid allegations of child sexual abuse. On September 12, 2017, amid more sexual abuse claims, Murray announced his resignation effective the next day.

== Personal life ==
Murray is of Irish descent. He is gay, and came out in 1980. In 2013, he married Michael Shiosaki at St. Mark's in Seattle; the two had been in a relationship for 22 years. Murray did not emphasize his sexual orientation during his career, describing himself as "a Democrat who happens to be gay". During his campaign for the Senate, as in many of his previous campaigns, he won the backing of the Gay & Lesbian Victory Fund.

== Child sexual abuse allegations ==
Five people have accused Murray of sexual abuse. In April 2017, a lawsuit claimed that he "raped and molested" a teenager in 1986, paying cash for sex to a high-school dropout addicted to crack cocaine. Two other men made similar allegations in 2007, including a foster son who said Murray sexually assaulted him in 1984 while he was a teenager. He had spoken with a child welfare investigator and detective at the time, and persuaded the investigator that Murray had sexually abused him, but no charges were filed.

Through a spokesman, Murray denied the allegations, describing them as falsehoods intended to prevent his reelection. Later, Murray's lawyer said that Murray had undergone a medical examination that disproved a claim about his genitals, arguing the lawsuit should be dropped.

On September 12, 2017, Murray's cousin accused him of sexual abuse when the two teens shared a bedroom in the mid-1970s. Later that day, Murray denied the new allegation, and announced his resignation, effective the next day.

After his resignation, Amnesty International asked the Police Service of Northern Ireland to open an investigation into Murray's 1974 trip to Belfast and Wales, which involved chaperoning 30 Catholic and Protestant children.

Washington State Senate
Preceded by Mike Hewitt	Minority Leader of the Washington Senate; 2012–2013	Succeeded by Sharon Nelson
Political offices
Preceded by Michael McGinn	Mayor of Seattle; 2014–2017	Succeeded by Bruce Harrell; Acting
