= Mary Ellen McCaffree =

American politician

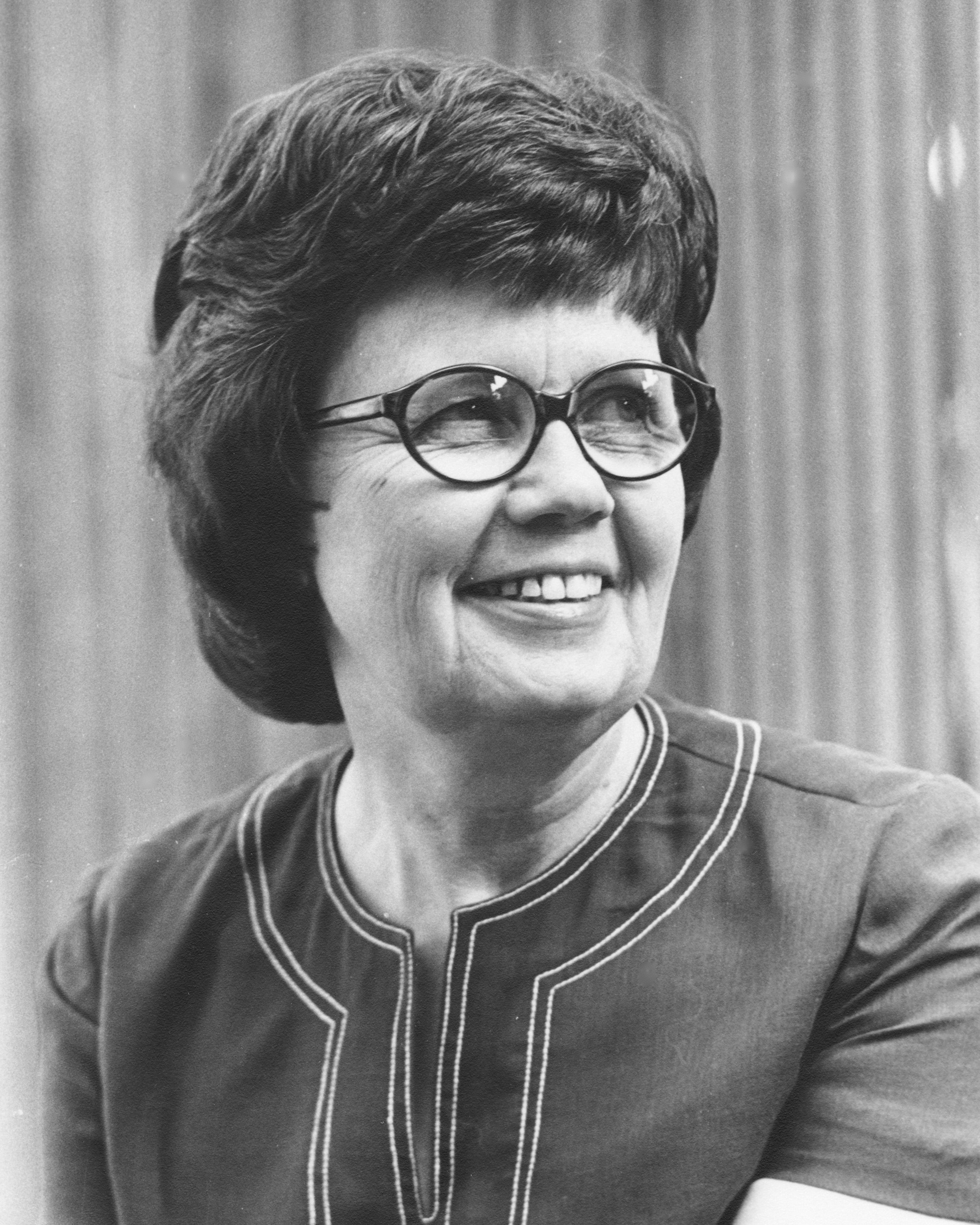

Member of the Washington House of Representatives from the 32nd district
- In office January 14, 1963 – January 11, 1971
- Preceded by: Jack England
- Succeeded by: Jeff Douthwaite

Personal details
- Born: February 25, 1918 El Dorado, Kansas, U.S.
- Died: June 24, 2014 (aged 96) Snohomish, Washington, U.S.
- Party: Republican

Mary Ellen McCaffree (February 25, 1918 – June 24, 2014) was an American politician in the state of Washington. She served in the Washington House of Representatives for the 32nd district from 1963 to 1971, representing the Republican Party. She specialized in tax policy and was responsible for tax reform that established the Department of Revenue, the constitutional amendment that lowered the voting age to eighteen, the legislation that established the state community college system and codified redistricting. McCaffree was director of the state Department of Revenue between 1974 and 1976 and worked as an aide for Governor Daniel J. Evans and Senator Slade Gorton after leaving office.

== Early life ==
McCaffree was born on February 25, 1918, in El Dorado, Kansas. She was the eldest of four children; her father was on the local school board and her mother volunteered for the Farm Bureau. In high school, she met Kenneth McCaffree, who would later become her husband. McCaffree attended Kansas State University, graduating with a home economics degree in 1941. After marriage, she raised their five children while her husband served in World War II.

In 1949, the family moved to Seattle, Washington, when her husband got a job teaching economics at the University of Washington. McCaffree met another faculty wife, Lois North, and the two joined the Seattle chapter of the League of Women Voters. With the League, they pushed for the introduction of a state income tax, for the voting age to be lowered to eighteen, and to enact a constitutional amendment that would create a recurrent, ten-year requirement for redistricting. She was inspired by the conditions at her children's schools to get involved, becoming the legislative chair of the King County Parent-Teacher Association. McCaffee was a strong believer that redistricting would lead to more state funds for local schools. She became president of the League and served as a member of the Municipal League and the Tax Advisory Council, chairing the property tax committee.

== Political career ==
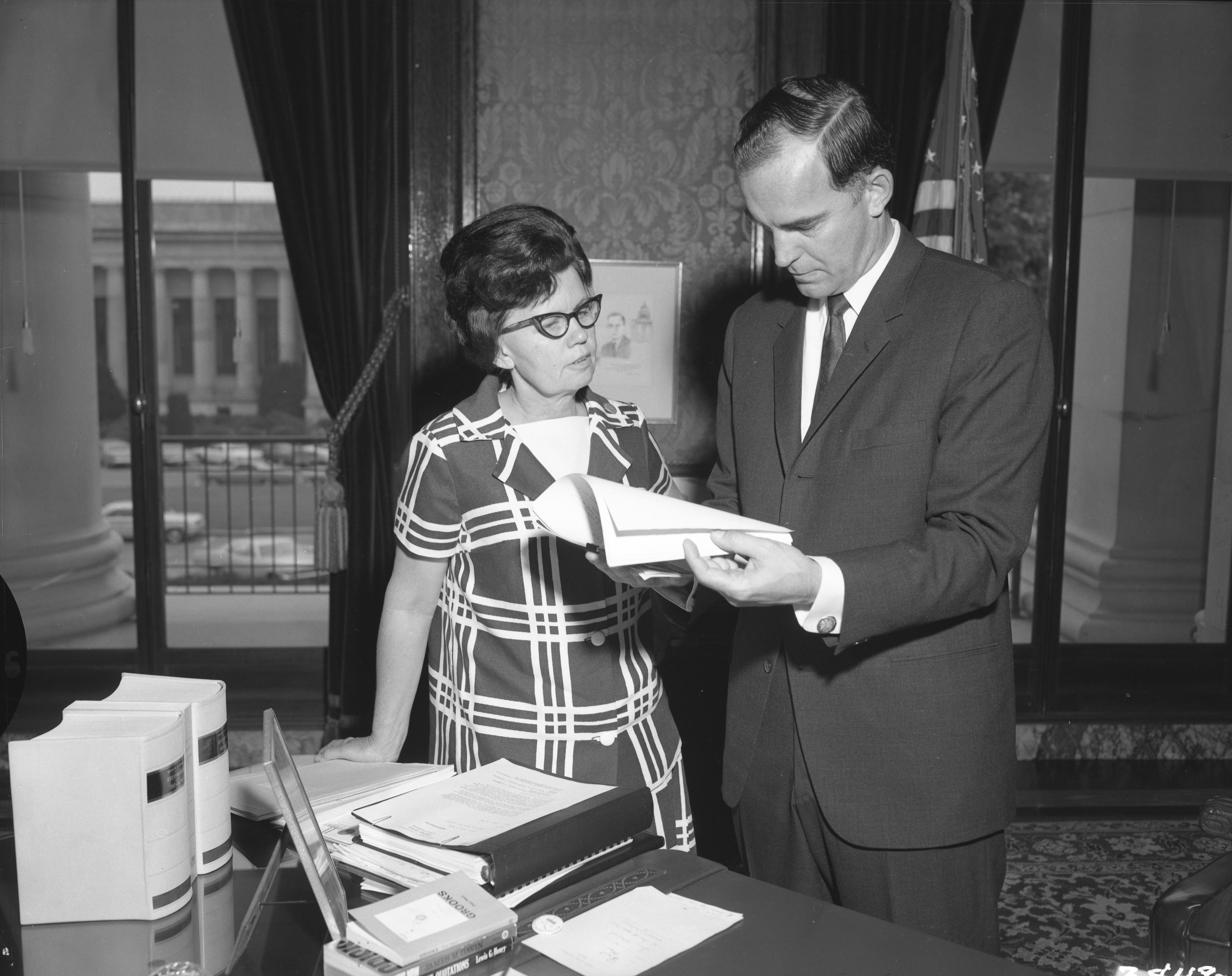
McCaffree with Governor Daniel J. Evans in 1968

Based on her activism, McCaffee was approached by both parties about running for office. She was first elected to the Washington House of Representatives in the 1962 general election, representing the 32nd district for the Republican Party. She served four terms, leaving office in 1971. She specialized in tax policy in the legislature, serving as chair of the tax and revenue committee and the revenue and regulatory agencies committee. She wrote tax reform legislation, working with fellow legislators Daniel J. Evans, Slade Gorton, and Joel Pritchard to amend tax laws, abolish the tax commission and establish the state Department of Revenue. She wrote the constitutional amendment that lowered the voting age, sponsored legislation for environmental protection, and passed redistricting legislation. She was on the temporary advisory council on higher education between 1965 and 1967 and was the co-author of the legislation that established the state community college system.

In 1970, she ran for the Washington State Senate, losing to the incumbent Pete Francis. She worked as a staff aide for Evans between 1971 and 1972, who was by then the governor, heading the Governor's Committee for a New Tax Policy before he appointed her as the director of the Department of Revenue between 1974 and 1976. McCafee was the first woman to hold the position. She also served on the first pollution control and shoreline management hearings board and was a delegate to the 1977 National Women's Conference in Houston, Texas. She was director of the King County Department of Budget and Program Planning between 1978 and 1980 and then served as the administrative assistant for now-Senator Gorton from 1981 to 1983.

McCaffee was appointed to the National Advisory Committee on Oceans and Atmosphere by President Ronald Reagan on July 2, 1984, serving until July 1, 1985, and was appointed on January 15, 1986, to the President's Child Safety Partnership. She was president of the Hansville Community Center, a board member of the Kitsap Land Trust, and commissioner for the Hansville Water District. In 2000, she was a co-founder of the Great Peninsula Conservancy. She worked with Anne McNamee Corbett to write Politics of the Possible about her experiences in the legislature, which was published in 2010.

== Death and legacy ==
She died on June 24, 2014, in Snohomish, Washington, at age 96. Her papers are held by the University of Washington. Her memoir served as the basis for a one-woman play entitled "Many Maps, One Voice", where Jane Fellows played McCaffree during her struggle to redistrict the state in order to prompt state funding for local schools, which premiered in 2019.
