= Albert Burrows =

American politician

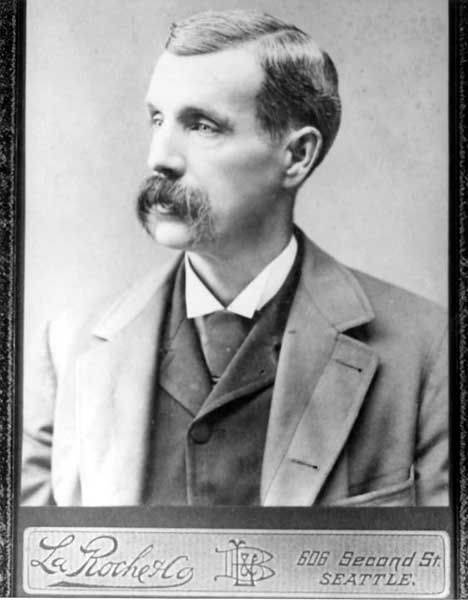
- Albert Burrows, 1890

Member of the Washington House of Representatives for the 43rd district
- In office 1895–1896

Personal details
- Born: February 20, 1837 Morgan County, Indiana, United States
- Died: April 30, 1896 (aged 59) Bellevue, Washington, United States
- Party: Republican

Albert Burrows (February 20, 1837 – April 30, 1896) was an American politician in the state of Washington. He served in the Washington House of Representatives from 1895 to 1896.
