= Darya Farivar =

American politician

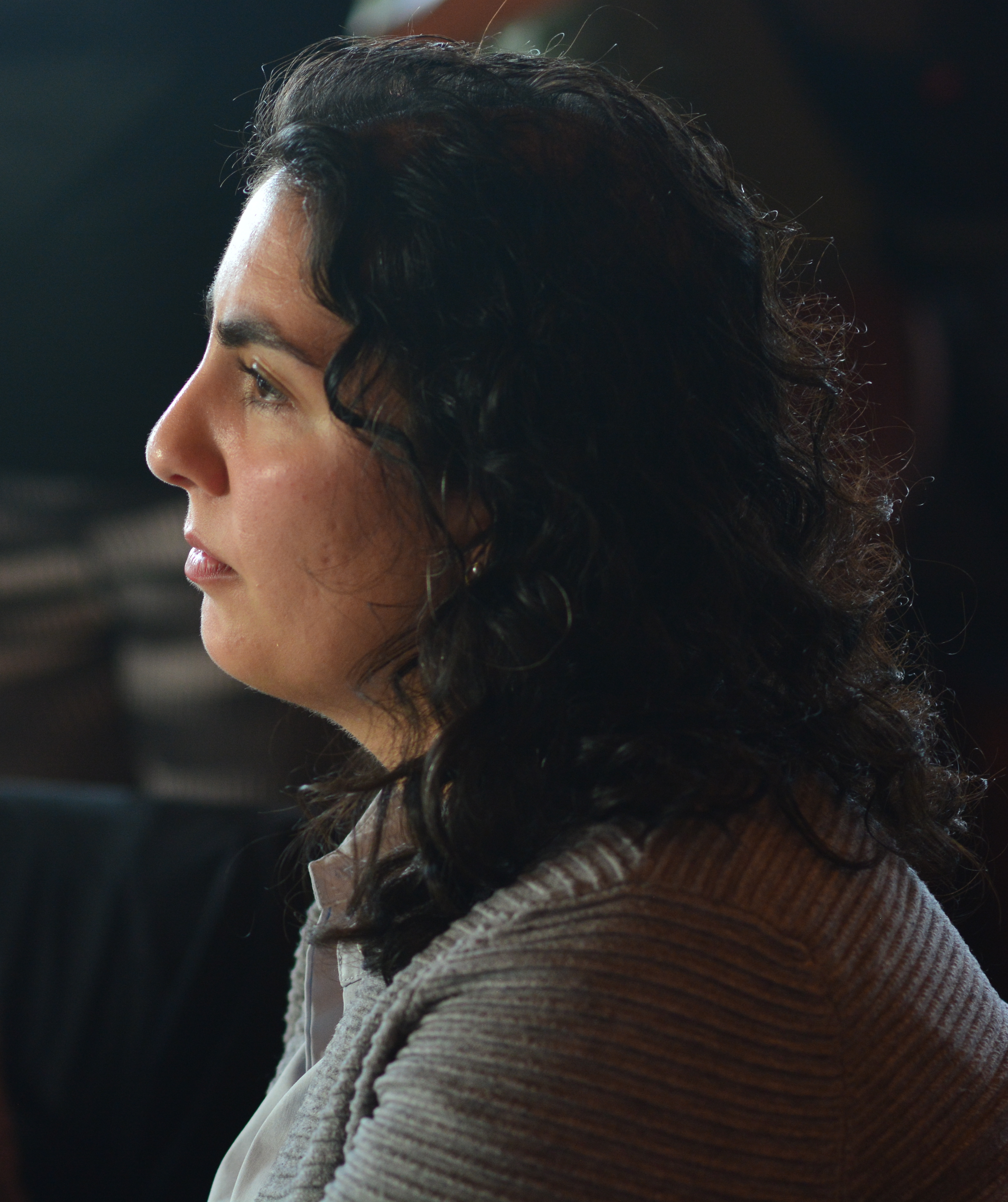

Member of the Washington House of Representatives from the 46th district
- Incumbent
- Assumed office January 9, 2023 Serving with Gerry Pollet
- Preceded by: Javier Valdez

Personal details
- Born: Seattle, Washington, U.S.
- Party: Democratic
- Education: University of Redlands (BA)
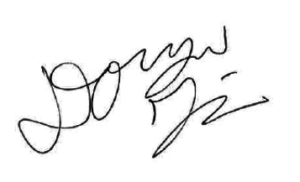
- Signature

Darya Farivar is an American politician who is a member of the Washington House of Representatives for the 46th district. Elected in November 2022, she assumed office on January 9, 2023.

== Early life and education ==
The daughter of immigrants from Iran, Farivar was born in Seattle and raised in the Lake City neighborhood. She earned a Bachelor of Arts degree in communicative disorders from the University of Redlands in 2016.

== Career ==
From 2016 to 2018, Farivar worked as the advocacy program coordinator of Open Doors for Multicultural Families, a non-profit based in Kent, Washington. She joined Disability Rights Washington in 2018 and has since worked as the organization's director of public policy. Farivar was elected to the Washington House of Representatives in November 2022.

In 2023, Farivar collaborated with the Center for Children and Youth Justice and Stand for Children WA to approve a bill seeking to eliminate legal financial obligations in juvenile court, including fines, fees and restitution. In lieu of charging juvenile offenders restitution, the bill would establish a Community Compensation Program to pay victims of crimes committed by juveniles.
