= William A. Rinehart =

American politician

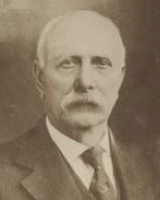

Member of the Virginia Senate from the 7th district
- In office January 10, 1912 – January 14, 1920
- Preceded by: Floyd W. King
- Succeeded by: George W. Layman

Member of the Virginia House of Delegates for Alleghany, Bath, and Highland
- In office December 4, 1895 – December 1, 1897
- Preceded by: Archibald F. Withrow
- Succeeded by: Archibald F. Withrow

Personal details
- Born: William Alonzo Rinehart; April 5, 1846 Fincastle, Virginia, U.S.
- Died: January 30, 1922 (aged 75) Covington, Virginia, U.S.
- Party: Democratic
- Spouse: Mary Lewis Lipes

Military service
- Allegiance: Confederate States
- Branch/service: Confederate States Army
- Years of service: 1862–1865
- Rank: Private
- Unit: 2nd Virginia Cavalry
- Battles/wars: American Civil War

William Alonzo Rinehart (April 5, 1846 – January 30, 1922) was an American Democratic politician who served as a member of the Virginia Senate, representing the state's 7th district.

Virginia House of Delegates
| Preceded by Archibald F. Withrow | Virginia Delegate for Alleghany, Bath, and Highland; 1895–1897 | Succeeded by Archibald F. Withrow |
Senate of Virginia
| Preceded by Floyd W. King | Virginia Senator for the 7th District; 1912–1920 | Succeeded by George W. Layman |
