= Tanya Woo =

American politician

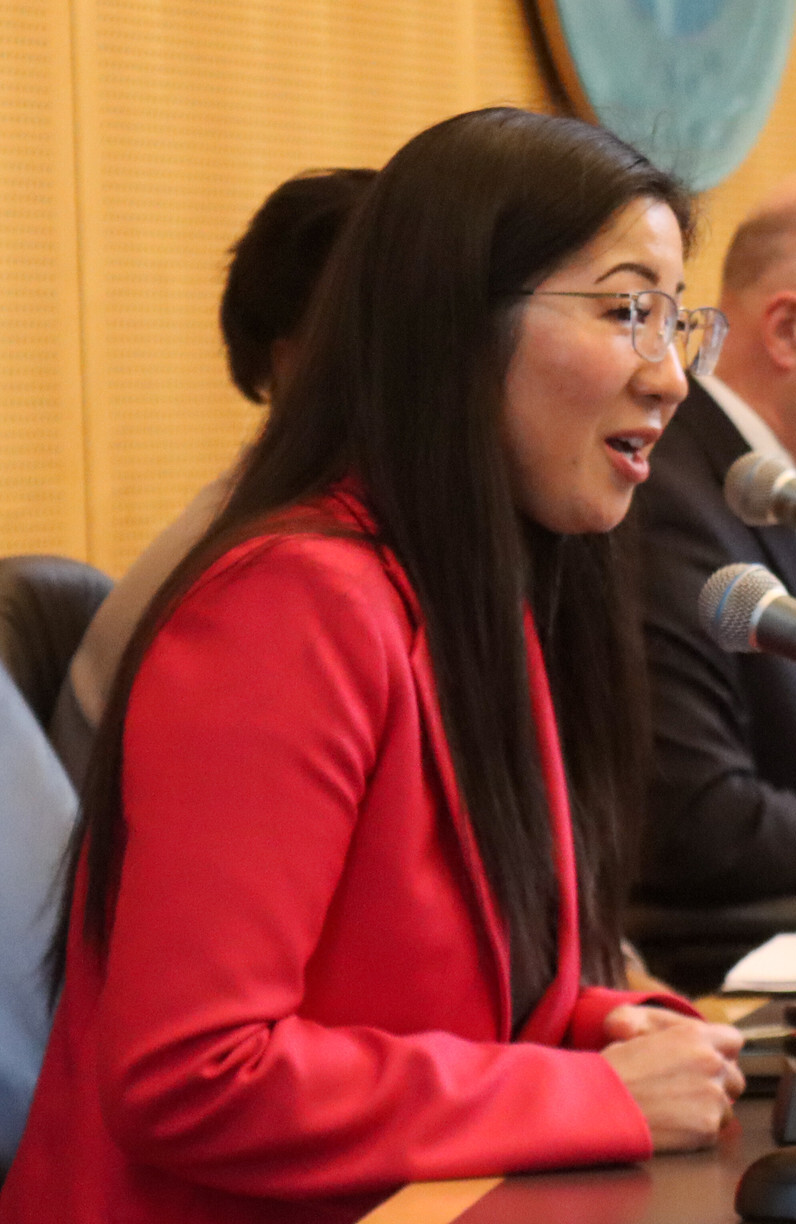
- Woo in 2024

Member of the Seattle City Council from the 8th district
- In office January 24, 2024 – November 26, 2024
- Preceded by: Teresa Mosqueda
- Succeeded by: Alexis Mercedes Rinck

Personal details
- Born: Seattle, Washington, U.S.
- Party: Democratic
- Spouse: Randall Wo-Eng
- Education: University of Washington (BA)

Tanya Woo (胡清雅) is an American politician from Seattle, Washington. She ran for Seattle City Council in 2023 in District 2 against incumbent Tammy Morales but lost by a narrow margin of 853 votes. Woo was then appointed to the city-wide District 8 seat in January 2024 but lost that seat in the November 2024 special election to Alexis Mercedes Rinck.

== Early life and education ==
Woo was born and raised in south Seattle. Her family immigrated to Seattle in 1887 from China and owned multiple small businesses throughout Seattle and the Chinatown–International District, Seattle. Woo's father bought the historic Louisa Hotel in 1963 and Woo took over the redevelopment of the hotel after a devastating fire in 2013.

Woo has a bachelor’s degree in Communications from the University of Washington.

== Community activism ==
In 2021, was a co-founder of Chinatown International District Community Watch (CIDCW), which was created after crimes such as robberies, assaults, and vandalism, occurred in the CID during the COVID-19 pandemic.

In September 2022, King County, Washington released a plan to expand an existing homeless shelter in the SoDo, Seattle neighborhood. The proposed expansion included 150 additional shelter beds, tiny homes, expanded support services, a sobering center, and reserved spaces for RVs. In response, Woo wrote an op-ed in the local International Examiner newspaper stating that the proposed expansion "...follows a long history of policies that have been forced on the CID, starting with the Chinese Exclusion Act of 1882. This is systemic racism." Community organizers, included Woo, organized a rally of primarily senior citizens asking to be heard about all the challenges the community has faced.

== Seattle City Council ==
=== 2023 election ===
In February 2023, Woo announced a run for Seattle City Council District 2, against incumbent Tammy Morales. She centered her campaign on public safety and homelessness, especially in the Chinatown International District. In the August 2023 Primary Election, Morales came in first with 52% of the vote, and Woo came in second with 42.5%, both moving on to the November primary.

After the primary, Woo held a press conference with councilmember Sara Nelson and community leaders who all criticized the city's and Morales' response to address the drug use and illegal market that had negatively impacted the Little Saigon neighborhood. Morales responded saying, "...if the chief can reallocate where we what we have right now so that the areas that are needing more attention are getting it that would be great." At a debate, Woo accused Morales of voting to defund the police when she voted on a non-binding resolution, which Morales denied despite her past statements showing support. Morales was critical of Woo's activism around stopping the SoDo shelter expansion due to the lack of shelter beds for homeless individuals.

In the November general election, Morales won 50.65% of the vote to Woo's 49.1%, with a narrow margin of 403 votes.

=== District 8 appointment ===
In January 2024, Teresa Mosqueda vacated her seat for Seattle City Council District 8, representing the entire city of Seattle, after being elected to King County Council District 8. 72 people, including Woo, applied for the vacant seat, and in a 5-3 vote the Council voted to appoint Woo to the seat. The appointment would last for ten months, until the November 2024 election and whoever won that election would only serve until the end of the term and would have to run for reelection in November 2025.

In June 2024, Woo announced that she would recuse herself from a controversial Gig Worker Wage Bill after recommendations by the Seattle Ethics and Elections Commission which stated there were potential conflicts of interest due to her husband and father-in-law owning a BBQ restaurant that uses food delivery apps. During her tenure, she voted in favor of various public safety-related legislation including, the "Stay Out of Drug Areas" (SODA) zones, proposing amendments to expand the Little Saigon SODA zone, and funding a pilot program to deploy surveillance cameras in high-crime areas. Woo also voted in favor of an amendment to allocate the full $20 million in funding previously promised by the Council for student mental health resources for select high schools, which failed, and only an additional $2.25 million was added.

=== 2024 special election ===
In March 2024, Woo announced that she would run in the November 2024 special election to remain on the city council.

In the August 2024 Primary Election, Woo came in second with 38.38% of the vote, and Alexis Mercedes Rinck, former assistant director of policy planning and state operations at the University of Washington, came in first with 50.18%. During a September debate, Woo promoted much of the legislation passed by the current council, including the recently passed SODA legislation, and policies supported by Mayor Harrell. Woo criticized Rinck for supporting policies similar to the previous council and for her time at the King County Regional Homelessness Authority where she authorized the 5-year-plan that would have cost nearly $12 billion. Rinck defended the price tag, saying it was to build housing, and she criticized Woo and the city council for not funding key services with progressive taxes.

In the general election, Rinck won with 58% of the vote to Woo's 41%.

== Electoral history ==
Seattle City Council District 2, Primary Election 2023
Party	Candidate	Votes	%
Nonpartisan	Tammy Morales	10,326	52.28%
Nonpartisan	Tanya Woo	8,406	42.56%
Nonpartisan	Margaret Elisabeth	937	4.74%
Nonpartisan	Write-in	81	0.41%
Turnout		20,156	30.65%
Registered electors		65,763	

Seattle City Council District 2, General Election 2023
Party	Candidate	Votes	%
Nonpartisan	Tammy Morales	13,123	50.65%
Nonpartisan	Tanya Woo	12,270	49.10%
Nonpartisan	Write-in	64	0.25%
Turnout		26,479	40.13%
Registered electors		65,990	

Seattle City Council Position 8, Primary Election 2024
Party	Candidate	Votes	%
Nonpartisan	Alexis Mercedes Rinck	99,394	50.18%
Nonpartisan	Tanya Woo	76,008	38.38%
Nonpartisan	Saunatina Sanchez	8,621	4.35%
Nonpartisan	Tariq Yusuf	7,521	3.80%
Nonpartisan	Saul Patu	5,958	3.01%
Nonpartisan	Write-in	554	0.28%
Turnout		209,652	43.19%
Registered electors		485,426	

Seattle City Council Position 8, General Election 2024
Party	Candidate	Votes	%
Nonpartisan	Alexis Mercedes Rinck	215,642	58.24%
Nonpartisan	Tanya Woo	153,146	41.36%
Nonpartisan	Write-in	1,491	0.40%
Turnout		420,495	83.97%
Registered electors		500,782	
