= Washington's 43rd legislative district =

Legislative district in Washington state

Coordinates: 47.64°N 122.32°W

Map of Washington's 43rd legislative district

Washington's 43rd legislative district is one of forty-nine districts in Washington state for representation in the state legislature. It covers parts of Seattle, specifically Downtown Seattle, First Hill, Capitol Hill, South Lake Union, Washington Park, Madison Park, Eastlake, Montlake, Portage Bay, Wallingford, Fremont, the University District (including the UW campus), Green Lake and parts of Phinney Ridge and Ravenna.

The district's legislators are state senator Jamie Pedersen and state representatives Nicole Macri (position 1) and Shaun Scott (position 2), all Democrats. The House of Representatives position 1 seat has the distinction of being held by an openly gay person longer than any other seat in the world, starting with Cal Anderson's appointment in 1987 and continuing through with Ed Murray, Jamie Pedersen, Brady Piñero Walkinshaw, and currently Nicole Macri.

== See also ==
- Washington Redistricting Commission
- Washington State Legislature
- Washington State Senate
- Washington House of Representatives
- Washington (state) legislative districts
