= Washington's 46th legislative district =

American legislative district

Coordinates: 47°42′N 122°18′W

Map of Washington's 46th legislative district

Washington's 46th legislative district is one of forty-nine districts in Washington state for representation in the state legislature. It consists of the northeast corner of the city of Seattle, including the neighborhoods of Green Lake, Roosevelt, Northgate, Wedgwood, and Lake City, with Aurora Avenue mostly serving as its western boundary and Northeast 45th Street as its southern boundary.

The district's legislators are state senator Javier Valdez and state representatives Gerry Pollet (position 1) and Darya Farivar (position 2), all Democrats.

== See also ==
- Washington Redistricting Commission
- Washington State Legislature
- Washington State Senate
- Washington House of Representatives
