= 2018 United States state legislative elections =

- November 6, 2018

87 legislative chambers 46 states
	Majority party	Minority party	Third party
Party	Republican	Democratic	Coalition
Chambers before	67	30	1 (Note: The Alaska House of Representatives is controlled by a coalition of Democrats, Republicans, and independents. The minority caucus consists of Republicans who are not part of the majority coalition.) (Note: On April 16, 2018, the Independent Democratic Conference, which had been in coalition with Republicans since 2012, dissolved, returning the chamber to Republican control.)
Chambers after	61	37	1
Overall change	▼6	▲7 (Note: The Connecticut Senate was tied in the 2017-2019 session, but Democrats gained control in the 2018 elections. This chamber was not included in the previous total.)	Steady
- Map of upper house elections: Democrats gained control Democrats retained control Republicans retained control Non-partisan legislature No regularly-scheduled elections

- Map of lower house elections: Democrats gained control Democrats retained control Republicans retained control Coalition retained control Non-partisan legislature No regularly-scheduled elections

The 2018 United States state legislative elections were held on November 6, 2018, for 87 state legislative chambers in 46 states. Across the fifty states, approximately 56 percent of all upper house seats and 92 percent of all lower house seats were up for election. Additionally, six territorial chambers in four territories and the District of Columbia were up as well.

Democrats made significant ground in state legislative races, flipping six chambers from the Republicans and winning control of one tied chamber.

== Summary table ==
Regularly scheduled elections were held in 87 of the 99 state legislative chambers in the United States; nationwide, regularly scheduled elections were held for 6,064 of the 7,383 legislative seats. Most legislative chambers held elections for all seats, but some legislative chambers that use staggered elections held elections for only a portion of the total seats in the chamber. The chambers that were not up for election either hold regularly scheduled elections in odd-numbered years, or have four-year terms and hold all regularly scheduled elections in presidential election years.

Note that this table only covers regularly scheduled elections; additional special elections took place concurrently with these regularly scheduled elections.

State	Upper House				Lower House			
State	Seats up	Total	% up	Term	Seats up	Total	% up	Term
Alabama	35	35	100	4	105	105	100	4
Alaska	10	20	50	4	40	40	100	2
Arizona	30	30	100	2	60	60	100	2
Arkansas	18	35	51	2/4 (Note: The upper houses of Arkansas, Delaware, Florida, Hawaii, Illinois, Minnesota, New Jersey, and Texas use a 2-4-4 term length system.)	100	100	100	2
California	20	40	50	4	80	80	100	2
Colorado	17	35	49	4	65	65	100	2
Connecticut	36	36	100	2	151	151	100	2
Delaware	10	21	48	2/4	41	41	100	2
Florida	20	40	50	2/4	120	120	100	2
Georgia	56	56	100	2	180	180	100	2
Hawaii	12	25	48	2/4	51	51	100	2
Idaho	35	35	100	2	70	70	100	2
Illinois	39	59	66	2/4	118	118	100	2
Indiana	25	50	50	4	100	100	100	2
Iowa	25	50	50	4	100	100	100	2
Kansas	0	40	0	4	125	125	100	2
Kentucky	19	38	50	4	100	100	100	2
Louisiana	0	39	0	4	0	105	0	4
Maine	35	35	100	2	151	151	100	2
Maryland	47	47	100	4	141	141	100	4
Massachusetts	40	40	100	2	160	160	100	2
Michigan	38	38	100	4	110	110	100	2
Minnesota	0	67	0	2/4	134	134	100	2
Mississippi	0	52	0	4	0	122	0	4
Missouri	17	34	50	4	163	163	100	2
Montana	25	50	50	4	100	100	100	2
Nebraska	24 (Note: These figures represent the seats of Nebraska's unicameral legislature.)	49	49	4	N/A (unicameral)			
Nevada	11	21	52	4	42	42	100	2
New Hampshire	24	24	100	2	400	400	100	2
New Jersey	0	40	0	2/4	0	80	0	2
New Mexico	0	42	100	4	70	70	100	2
New York	63	63	100	2	150	150	100	2
North Carolina	50	50	100	2	120	120	100	2
North Dakota	24	47	51	4	47	94	50	4
Ohio	16	33	52	4	99	99	100	2
Oklahoma	24	48	50	4	101	101	100	2
Oregon	15	30	50	4	60	60	100	2
Pennsylvania	25	50	50	4	203	203	100	2
Rhode Island	38	38	100	2	75	75	100	2
South Carolina	0	46	0	4	124	124	100	2
South Dakota	35	35	100	2	70	70	100	2
Tennessee	17	33	52	4	99	99	100	2
Texas	15	31	48	2/4	150	150	100	2
Utah	14	29	48	4	75	75	100	2
Vermont	30	30	100	2	150	150	100	2
Virginia	0	40	0	4	0	100	0	2
Washington	25	49	49	4	98	98	100	2
West Virginia	17	34	50	4	100	100	100	2
Wisconsin	17	33	52	4	99	99	100	2
Wyoming	15	30	50	4	60	60	100	2
Total	1106	1972	56	N/A	4958	5411	92	N/A

== Electoral predictions ==
News sources predicted Democrats would make significant gains in state legislative control, flipping multiple chambers and narrowing Republican majorities in many others.

Ratings are designated as follows:

- "Tossup": Competitive, no advantage
- "Lean": Competitive, slight advantage
- "Likely": Not competitive, but opposition could make significant gains
- "Safe": Not competitive at all

State	PVI	Chamber	Last election	Governing Oct. 8, 2018	Daily Kos Oct. 11, 2018	Result
Alabama	R+14	Senate	R 27–8	Safe R	Safe R	R 27–8
Alabama	R+14	House of Representatives	R 72–33	Safe R	Safe R	R 77–28
Alaska	R+9	Senate	R 14–6	Safe R	Safe R	R 13–7
Alaska	R+9	House of Representatives	Coal. 22–18	Tossup	Lean Coal.	Coal. 23–15–2
Arizona	R+5	Senate	R 17–13	Lean R	Tossup	R 17–13
Arizona	R+5	House of Representatives	R 35–25	Likely R	Lean R	R 31–29
Arkansas	R+15	Senate	R 26–9	Safe R	Safe R	R 26–9
Arkansas	R+15	House of Representatives	R 73–27	Safe R	Safe R	R 76–24
California	D+12	State Senate	D 27–13	Safe D	Safe D	D 29–11
California	D+12	State Assembly	D 55–25	Safe D	Safe D	D 61–18–1
Colorado	D+1	Senate	R 18–17	Tossup	Lean D (flip)	D 19–16
Colorado	D+1	House of Representatives	D 37–28	Likely D	Safe D	D 41–24
Connecticut	D+6	State Senate	18–18	Tossup	Tossup	D 22–14
Connecticut	D+6	House of Representatives	D 80–71	Lean D	Likely D	D 97–54
Delaware	D+6	Senate	D 11–10	Lean D	Lean D	D 12–9
Delaware	D+6	House of Representatives	D 25–16	Safe D	Safe D	D 26–15
Florida	R+2	Senate	R 25–15	Lean R	Lean R	R 23–17
Florida	R+2	House of Representatives	R 79–41	Likely R	Safe R	R 73–47
Georgia	R+5	State Senate	R 38–18	Likely R	Safe R	R 35–21
Georgia	R+5	House of Representatives	R 118–62	Likely R	Safe R	R 105–75
Hawaii	D+18	Senate	D 25–0	Safe D	Safe D	D 24–1
Hawaii	D+18	House of Representatives	D 45–6	Safe D	Safe D	D 46–5
Idaho	R+19	Senate	R 29–6	Safe R	Safe R	R 28–7
Idaho	R+19	House of Representatives	R 59–11	Safe R	Safe R	R 56–14
Illinois	D+7	Senate	D 37–22	Safe D	Safe D	D 40–19
Illinois	D+7	House of Representatives	D 67–51	Safe D	Safe D	D 74–44
Indiana	R+9	Senate	R 41–9	Safe R	Safe R	R 40–10
Indiana	R+9	House of Representatives	R 70–30	Likely R	Safe R	R 67–33
Iowa	R+3	Senate	R 29–20–1	Safe R	Likely R	R 32–18
Iowa	R+3	House of Representatives	R 59–41	Lean R	Tossup	R 53–47
Kansas	R+13	House of Representatives	R 85–40	Safe R	Safe R	R 84–41
Kentucky	R+15	Senate	R 27–11	Safe R	Safe R	R 28–10
Kentucky	R+15	House of Representatives	R 64–36	Safe R	Safe R	R 61–39
Maine	D+3	Senate	R 18–17	Tossup	Likely D (flip)	D 21–14
Maine	D+3	House of Representatives	D 77–72–2	Lean D	Likely D	D 89–56–6
Maryland	D+12	Senate	D 33–14	Safe D	Safe D	D 32–15
Maryland	D+12	House of Representatives	D 92–49	Safe D	Safe D	D 99–42
Massachusetts	D+12	Senate	D 34–6	Safe D	Safe D	D 34–6
Massachusetts	D+12	House of Representatives	D 125–35	Safe D	Safe D	D 127–32–1
Michigan	D+1	Senate	R 27–11	Likely R	Safe R	R 22–16
Michigan	D+1	House of Representatives	R 63–47	Lean R	Lean R	R 58–52
Minnesota	D+1	House of Representatives	R 77–57	Lean R	Tossup	D 75–59
Missouri	R+9	Senate	R 25–9	Likely R	Safe R	R 23–10
Missouri	R+9	House of Representatives	R 117–46	Likely R	Safe R	R 116–47
Montana	R+11	Senate	R 32–18	Safe R	Safe R	R 30–20
Montana	R+11	House of Representatives	R 59–41	Safe R	Safe R	R 58–42
Nevada	D+1	Senate	D 11–10	Likely D	Likely D	D 13–8
Nevada	D+1	Assembly	D 27–15	Likely D	Safe D	D 29–13
New Hampshire	D+1	Senate	R 14–10	Lean D (flip)	Lean R	D 14–10
New Hampshire	D+1	House of Representatives	R 227–173	Lean D (flip)	Lean D (flip)	D 234–166
New Mexico	D+3	House of Representatives	D 38–32	Safe D	Safe D	D 46–24
New York	D+11	State Senate	Coal. 39–24	Lean D (flip)	Likely D (flip)	D 40–23
New York	D+11	State Assembly	D 106–43–1	Safe D	Safe D	D 105–44–1
North Carolina	R+3	Senate	R 35–15	Likely R	Safe R	R 29–21
North Carolina	R+3	House of Representatives	R 74–46	Likely R	Likely R	R 65–55
North Dakota	R+16	Senate	R 38–9	Safe R	Safe R	R 37–10
North Dakota	R+16	House of Representatives	R 81–13	Safe R	Safe R	R 79–15
Ohio	R+3	Senate	R 24–9	Safe R	Safe R	R 24–9
Ohio	R+3	House of Representatives	R 66–33	Likely R	Safe R	R 61–38
Oklahoma	R+20	Senate	R 42–6	Safe R	Safe R	R 38–9
Oklahoma	R+20	House of Representatives	R 75–26	Likely R	Safe R	R 77–23
Oregon	D+5	State Senate	D 17–13	Safe D	Safe D	D 18–12
Oregon	D+5	House of Representatives	D 35–25	Safe D	Safe D	D 38–22
Pennsylvania	EVEN	State Senate	R 34–16	Likely R	Safe R	R 28–21–1
Pennsylvania	EVEN	House of Representatives	R 121–82	Likely R	Likely R	R 110–93
Rhode Island	D+10	Senate	D 33–5	Safe D	Safe D	D 33–5
Rhode Island	D+10	House of Representatives	D 64–10–1	Safe D	Safe D	D 66–9
South Carolina	R+8	House of Representatives	R 80–44	Safe R	Safe R	R 80–44
South Dakota	R+14	Senate	R 29–6	Safe R	Safe R	R 30–5
South Dakota	R+14	House of Representatives	R 60–10	Safe R	Safe R	R 59–11
Tennessee	R+14	Senate	R 28–5	Safe R	Safe R	R 27–5
Tennessee	R+14	House of Representatives	R 74–25	Safe R	Safe R	R 73–26
Texas	R+8	Senate	R 20–11	Safe R	Safe R	R 19–12
Texas	R+8	House of Representatives	R 95–55	Likely R	Safe R	R 83–67
Utah	R+20	State Senate	R 24–5	Safe R	Safe R	R 23–6
Utah	R+20	House of Representatives	R 62–13	Safe R	Safe R	R 59–16
Vermont	D+15	Senate	D 21–7–2	Safe D	Safe D	D 22–6–2
Vermont	D+15	House of Representatives	D 85–53–7–7	Safe D	Safe D	D 95–43–7–5
Washington	D+7	State Senate	D 26–23 (Note: Includes a 2017 special election that flipped a seat to Democrats, winning them control of the chamber from the Majority Coalition Caucus)	Likely D	Safe D	D 28–21
Washington	D+7	House of Representatives	D 50–48	Likely D	Safe D	D 57–41
West Virginia	R+19	Senate	R 22–12	Likely R	Likely R	R 20–14
West Virginia	R+19	House of Delegates	R 63–37	Safe R	Safe R	R 59–41
Wisconsin	EVEN	Senate	R 20–13	Tossup	Lean R	R 19–14
Wisconsin	EVEN	State Assembly	R 64–35	Likely R	Safe R	R 63–34
Wyoming	R+25	Senate	R 27–3	Safe R	Safe R	R 27–3
Wyoming	R+25	House of Representatives	R 52–8	Safe R	Safe R	R 50–9–1

== National results ==
Lower house results by party
Party	Seats before (Note: Counts seats that were vacant prior to the election towards the party that last held them)	Chambers before	Seats after	+/-	Chambers after	+/-
Republican	3,034	31	2,792	▼242	29	▼2
Democratic	2,348	17	2,594	▲246	19	▲2
Independent	20	0	17	▼3	0	Steady
Progressive	7	0	7	Steady	0	Steady
Independence	1	0	1	Steady	0	Steady
Green	1	0	0	▼1	0	Steady
Total	5,411	49	5,411	—	49	—

Upper house results by party (Note: Counts seats in the officially nonpartisan Nebraska legislature towards the party that endorsed each candidate)
Party	Seats before	Chambers before	Seats after	+/-	Chambers after	+/-
Republican	1,153	36	1,091	▼62	32	▼4
Democratic	811	13	877	▲66	18	▲5
Independent	5	0	2	▼3	0	Steady
Progressive	2	0	2	Steady	0	Steady
Libertarian	1	0	0	▼1	0	Steady
Total	1,972	50	1,972	—	50	—

Democrats flipped over 350 state legislative seats from the Republicans, with Republican flips offsetting their to total net gain to just over 300 seats. Democrats picked up most of those seats in states where President Trump's approval rating was relatively low. Six chambers—the Colorado Senate, New Hampshire House, New Hampshire Senate, Minnesota House, Maine Senate, and New York State Senate—flipped from Republican to Democratic control. Additionally the Connecticut Senate went from being evenly divided to a Democratic majority. Democrats also broke Republican legislative supermajorities in North Carolina, Michigan, and Pennsylvania, and they gained a legislative supermajority in both houses of the California, Illinois, and Oregon legislatures.

== Maps ==
Partisan control of states in the 2018 elections
Democrats retained trifecta
Democrats gained trifecta
Republicans retained trifecta
Republicans gained trifecta
Divided government maintained
Divided government established
Officially non-partisan legislature

Upper house seats by party holding majority in each state
Republican 50–60% 60–70% 70–80% 80–90% 90–100%	Democratic 50–60% 60–70% 70–80% 80–90% 90–100%

Lower house seats by party holding majority in each state
Republican 50–60% 60–70% 70–80% 80–90%	Democratic 50–60% 60–70% 70–80% 80–90% 90–100%

Net changes to upper house seats after the 2018 elections
+1 Dem seat +2 Dem seats +3–5 Dem seats +6–8 Dem seats
+1 Rep seat +3 Rep seats

Net changes to lower house seats after the 2018 elections
+1 Dem seat +2 Dem seats +3–5 Dem seats
+6–12 Dem seats +16–18 Dem seats +61 Dem seats
+1 Rep seat +2 Rep seats +5 Rep seats
+1 Ind seat

== State summaries ==
=== Alabama ===
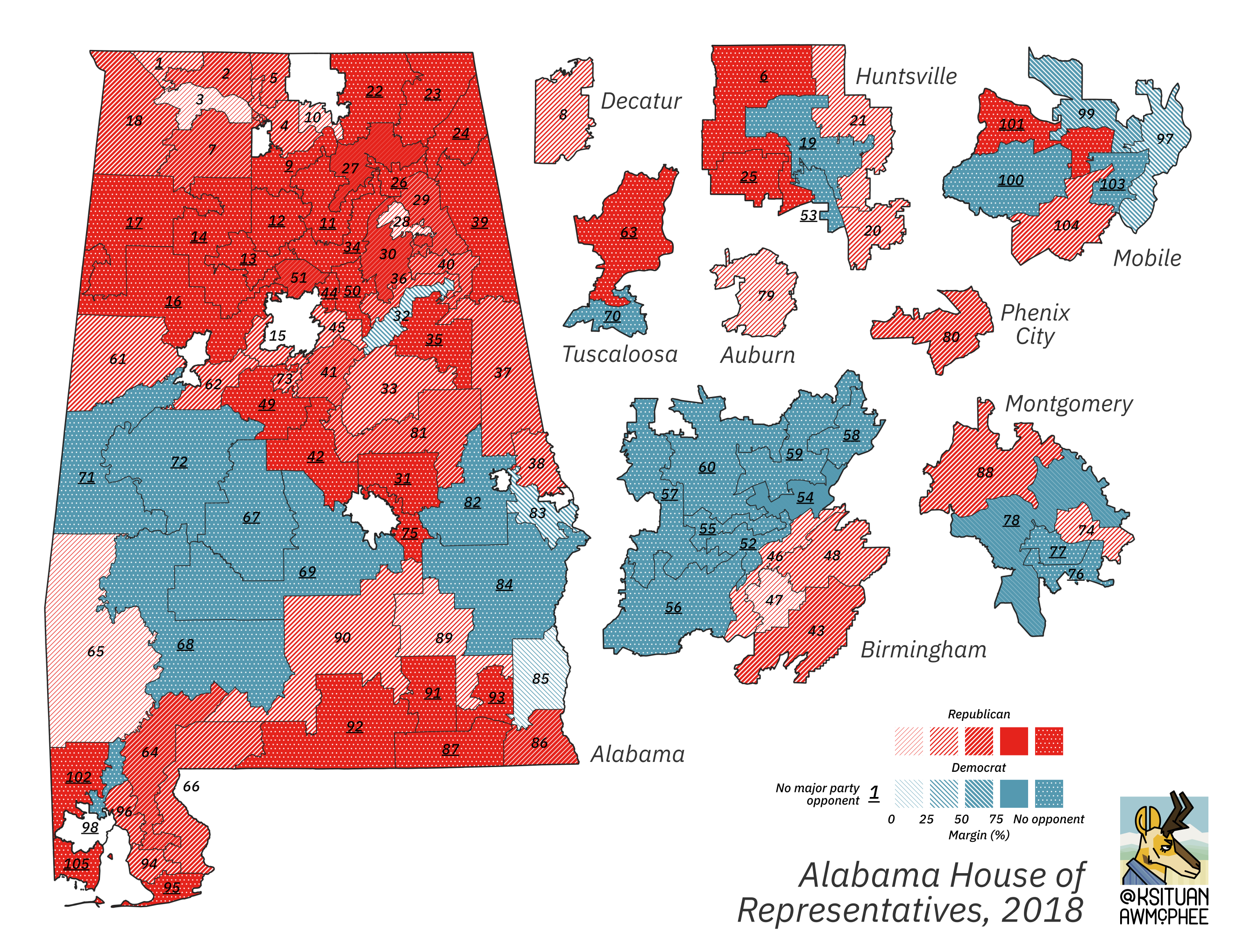
2018 Alabama House of Representatives elections

All members of the Alabama Senate and the Alabama House of Representatives were up for election in 2018. Republicans retained control of both chambers.

Alabama Senate
Party	Before	After	Change
Republican	26	27	▲1
Independent	1	0	▼1
Democratic	8	8	Steady
Total	35	35	

Alabama House of Representatives
Party	Before	After	Change
Republican	72	77	▲5
Democratic	33	28	▼5
Total	105	105	

=== Alaska ===
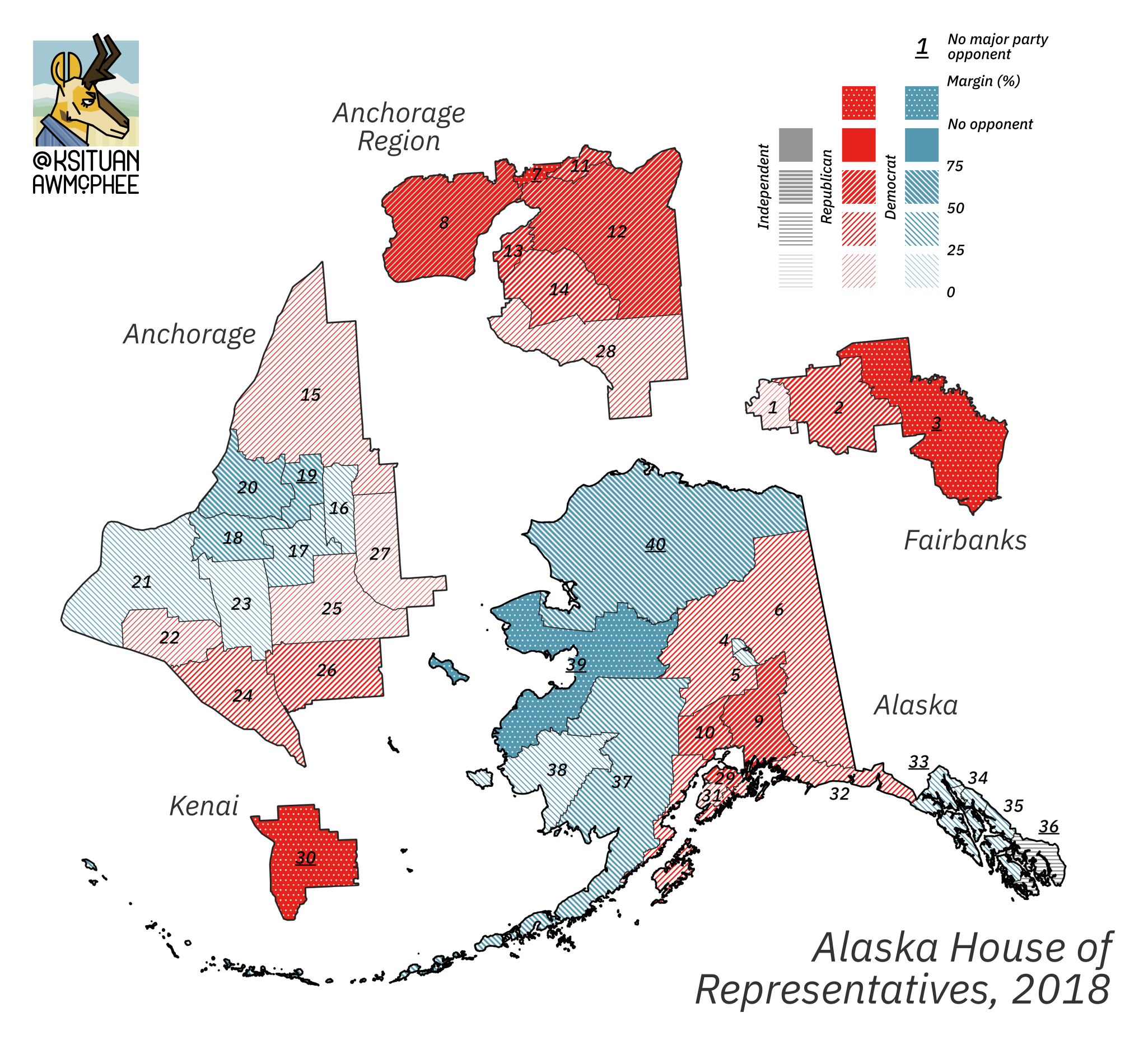
2018 Alaska House of Representatives elections

Half of the seats of the Alaska Senate and all of the seats of the Alaska House of Representatives were up for election in 2018. Republicans retained control of the Senate, while a cross-partisan coalition of Democrats, Republicans, and independents retained control of the House of Representatives.

Alaska Senate
Party	Before	After	Change
Republican	14	13	▼1
Democratic	6	7	▲1
Total	20	20	

Alaska House of Representatives
Party	Before	After	Change
Democratic	17 (Note: Coalition consisted of 17 Democrats, 3 Republicans, and 2 Independents.)	15 (Note: Coalition consisted of 15 Democrats, 8 Republicans, and 2 Independents.)	▼2
Independent	2	2	Steady
Republican	3	8	▲2
Republican	18	15	▲2
Total	40	40	

=== Arizona ===
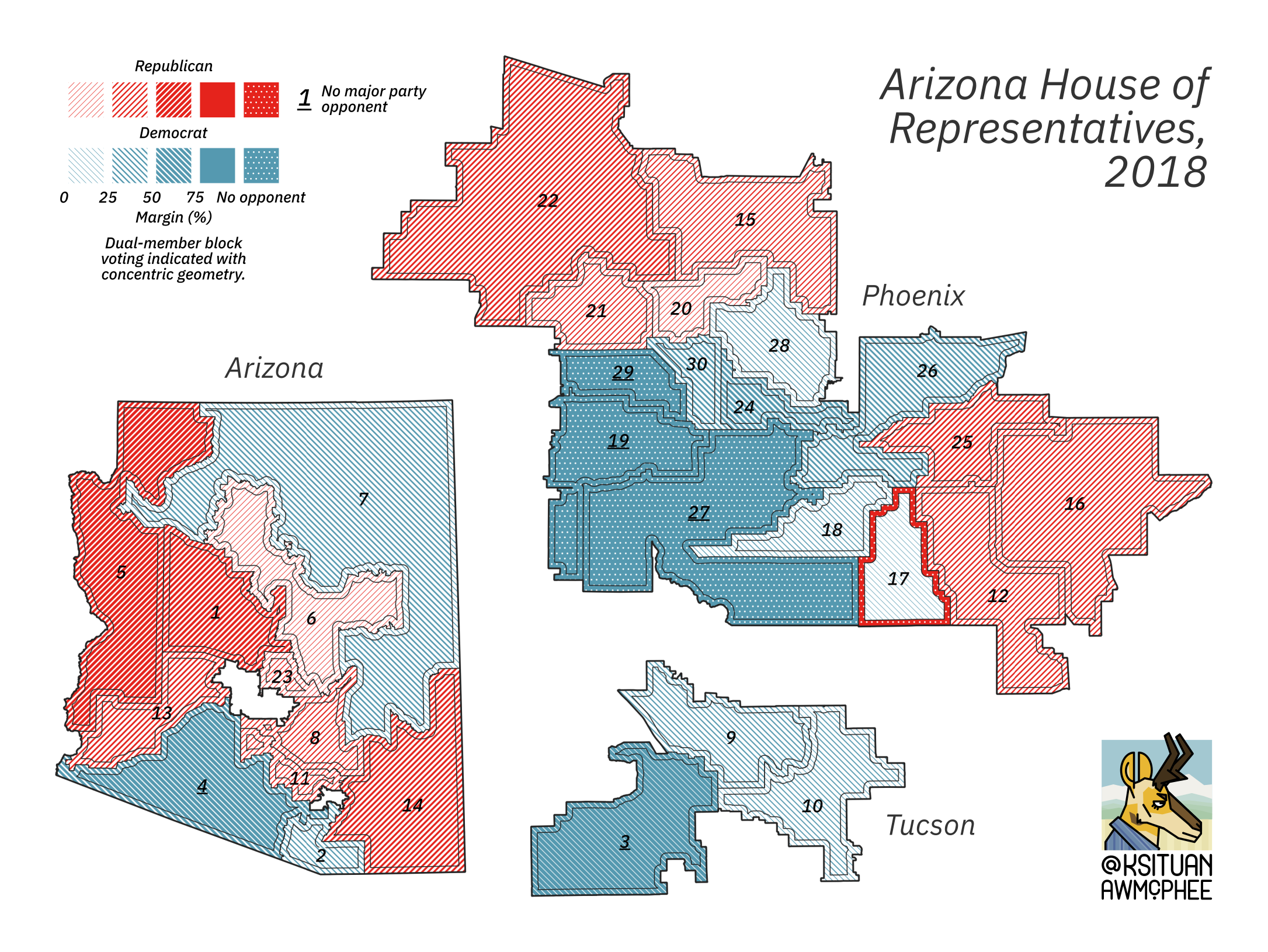
2018 Arizona House of Representatives elections

All of the seats of the Arizona Senate and the Arizona House of Representatives were up for election in 2018. Republicans retained control of both chambers, but lost four seats in the House and lost the popular vote in the Senate by 1.4 points.

Arizona Senate
Party	Before	After	Change
Republican	17	17	Steady
Democratic	13	13	Steady
Total	30	30	

Arizona House of Representatives
Party	Before	After	Change
Republican	35	31	▼4
Democratic	25	29	▲4
Total	60	60	

=== Arkansas ===
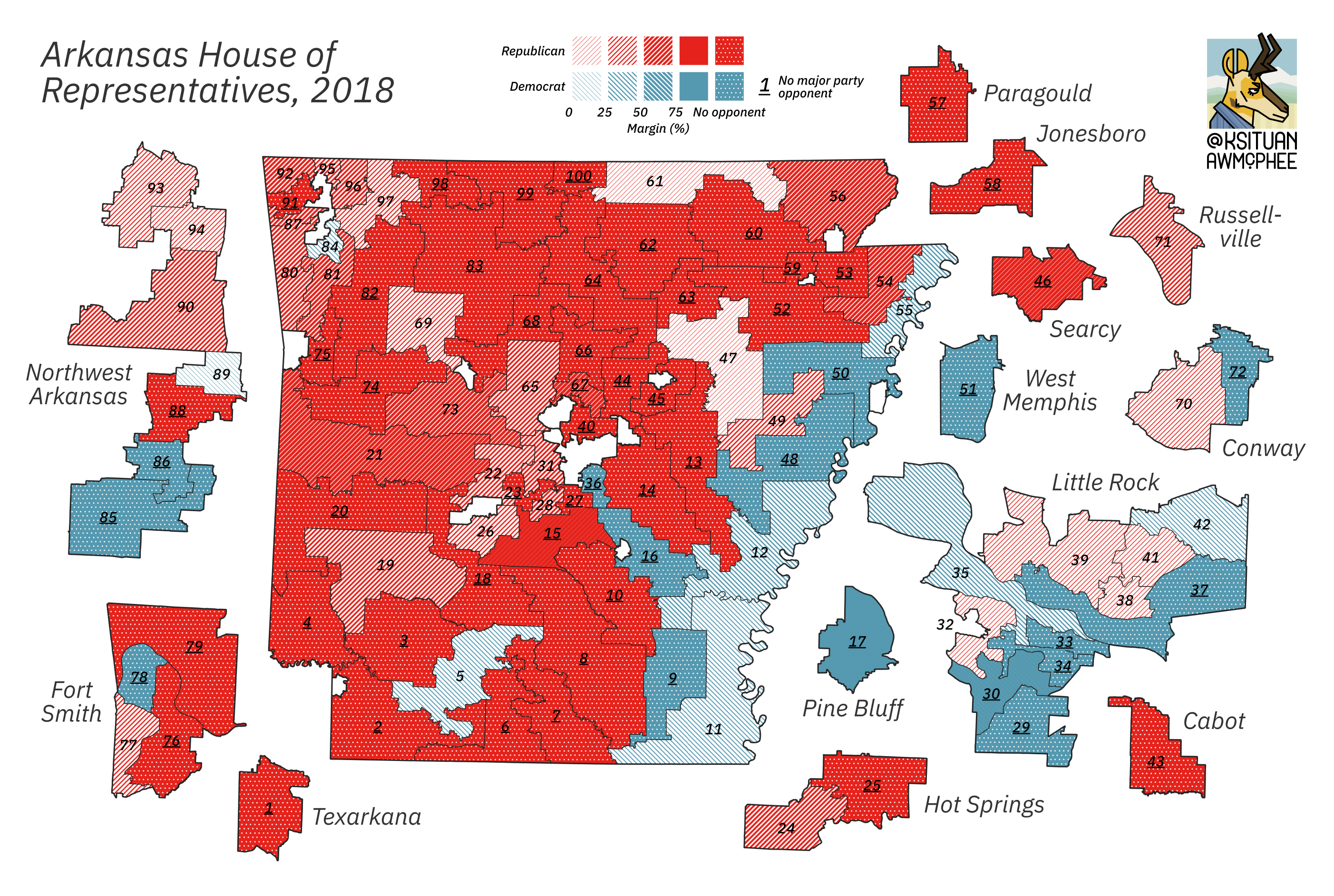
2018 Arkansas House of Representatives elections

Half of the seats of the Arkansas Senate and all of the seats of the Arkansas House of Representatives were up for election in 2018. Republicans retained control of both chambers.

Arkansas Senate
Party	Before	After	Change
Republican	28	29	▲1
Democratic	7	6	▼1
Total	35	35	

Arkansas House of Representatives
Party	Before	After	Change
Republican	77	82	▲5
Democratic	23	18	▼5
Total	100	100	

=== California ===
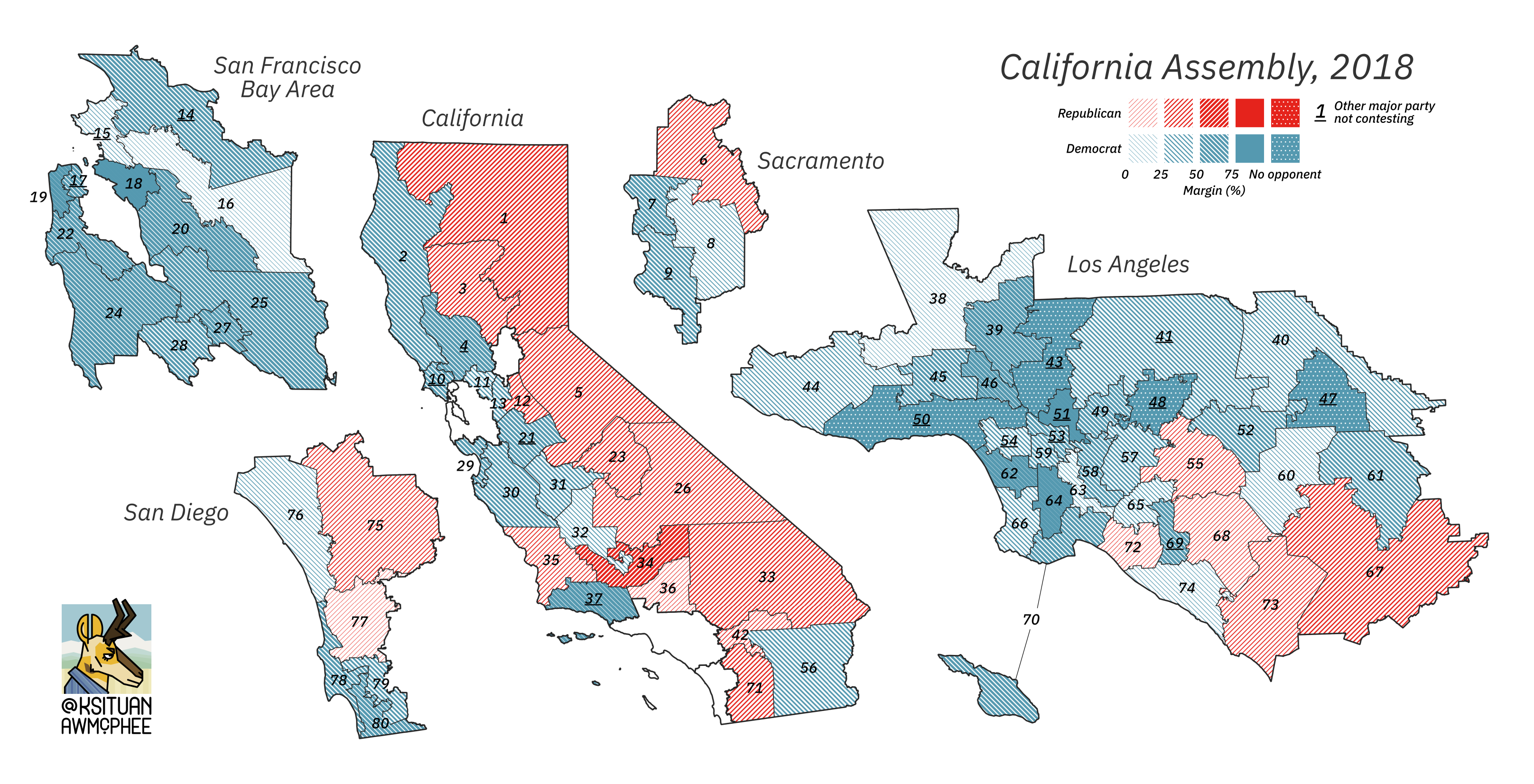
2018 California Assembly elections

Half of the seats of the California State Senate and all of the seats of the California State Assembly were up for election in 2018. Democrats retained control of both chambers.

California State Senate
Party	Before	After	Change
Democratic	26	29	▲3
Republican	14	11	▼3
Total	40	40	

California State Assembly
Party	Before	After	Change
Democratic	55	60	▲5
Republican	25	20	▼5
Total	80	80	

=== Colorado ===
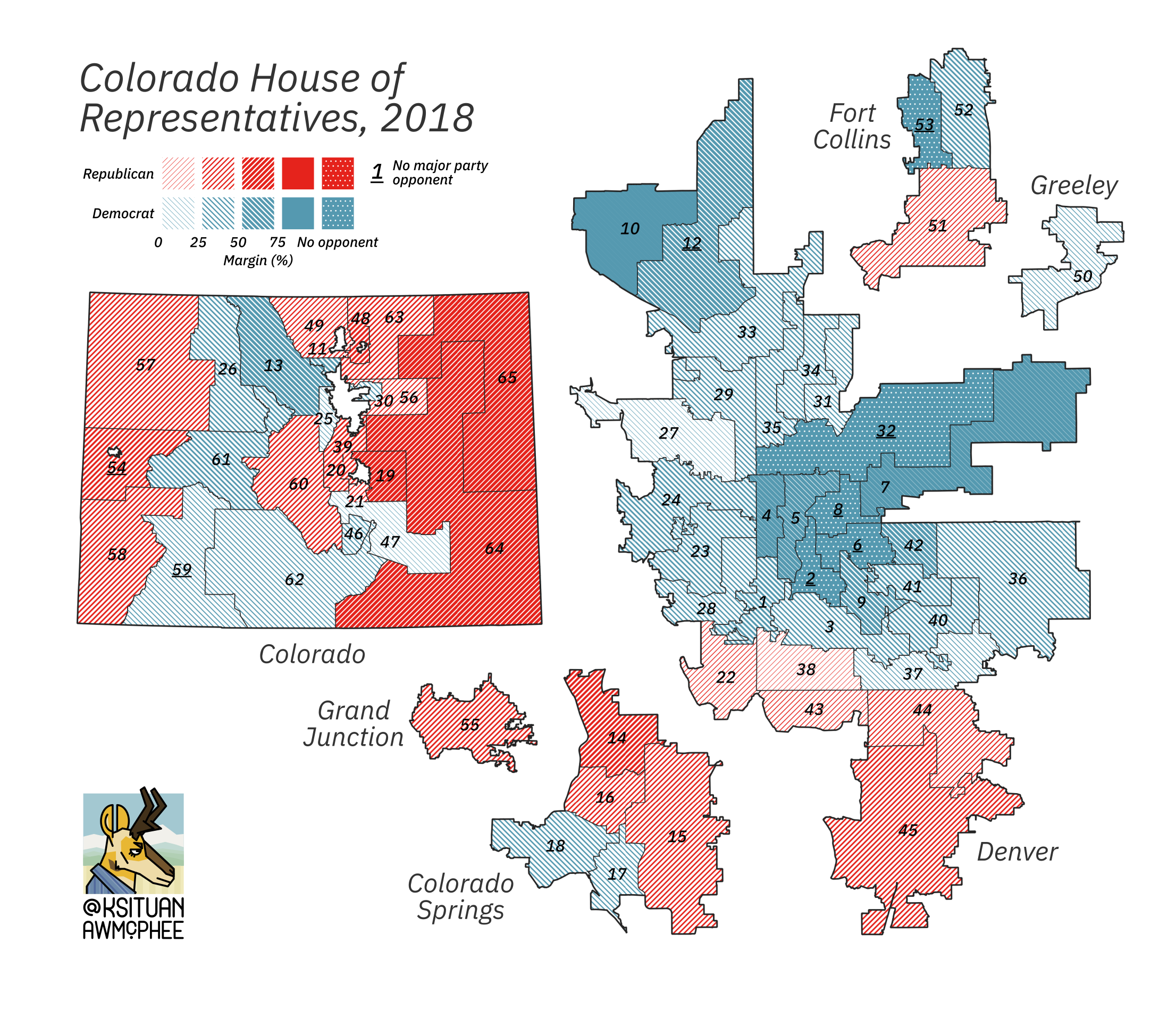
2018 Colorado House of Representatives elections

Half of the seats of the Colorado Senate and all of the seats of the Colorado House of Representatives were up for election in 2018. Democrats won control of the Senate and retained control of the House of Representatives.

Colorado Senate
Party	Before	After	Change
Democratic	17	19	▲2
Republican	18	16	▼2
Total	35	35	

Colorado House of Representatives
Party	Before	After	Change
Democratic	37	42	▲5
Republican	28	23	▼5
Total	65	65	

=== Connecticut ===
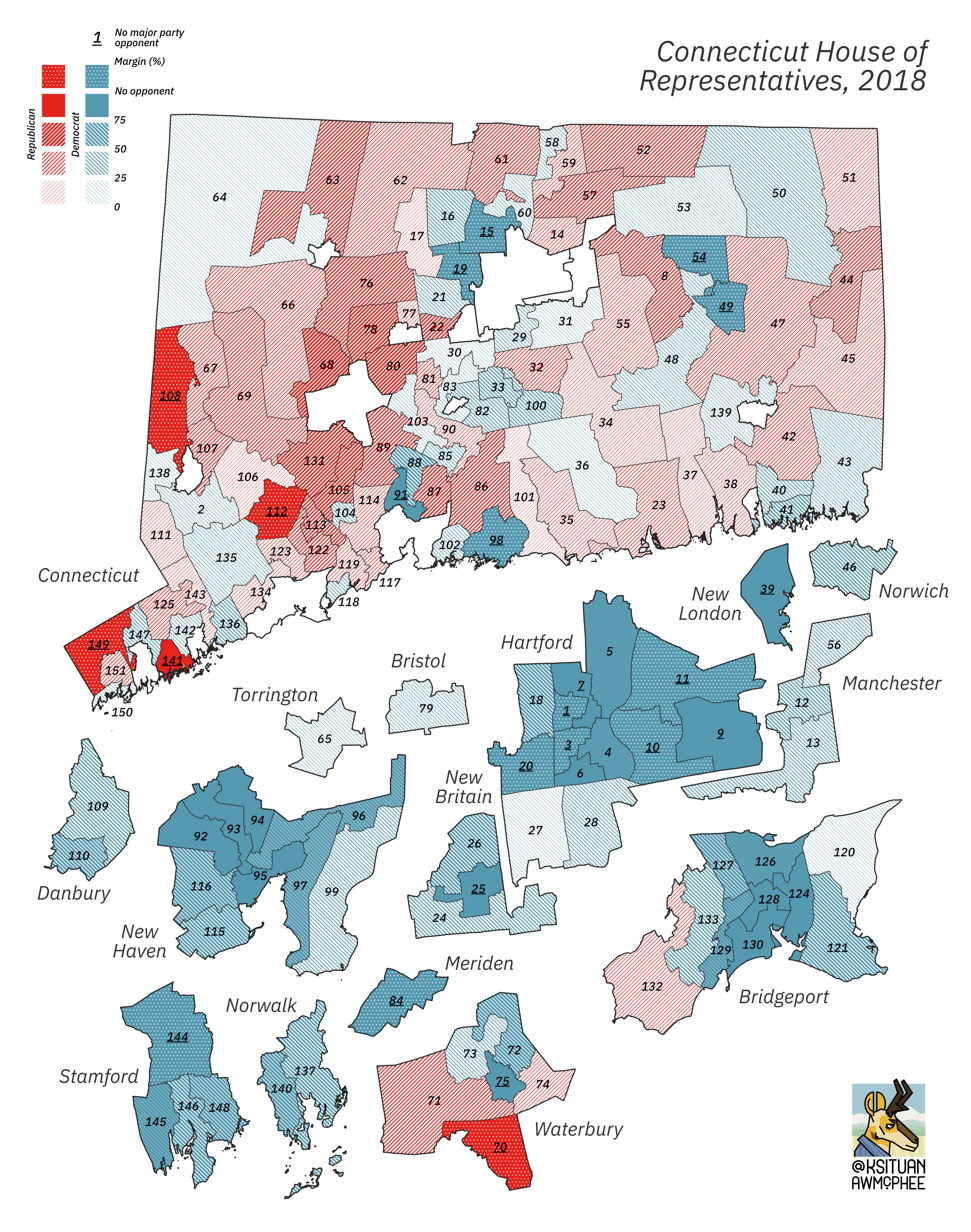
2018 Connecticut House of Representatives elections

All of the seats of the Connecticut State Senate and the Connecticut House of Representatives were up for election in 2018. Democrats won control of the Senate, which was previously tied and retained control of the House of Representatives.

Connecticut State Senate
Party	Before	After	Change
Democratic	18	23	▲5
Republican	18	13	▼5
Total	36	36	

Connecticut House of Representatives
Party	Before	After	Change
Democratic	80	92	▲12
Republican	71	59	▼12
Total	151	151	

=== Delaware ===
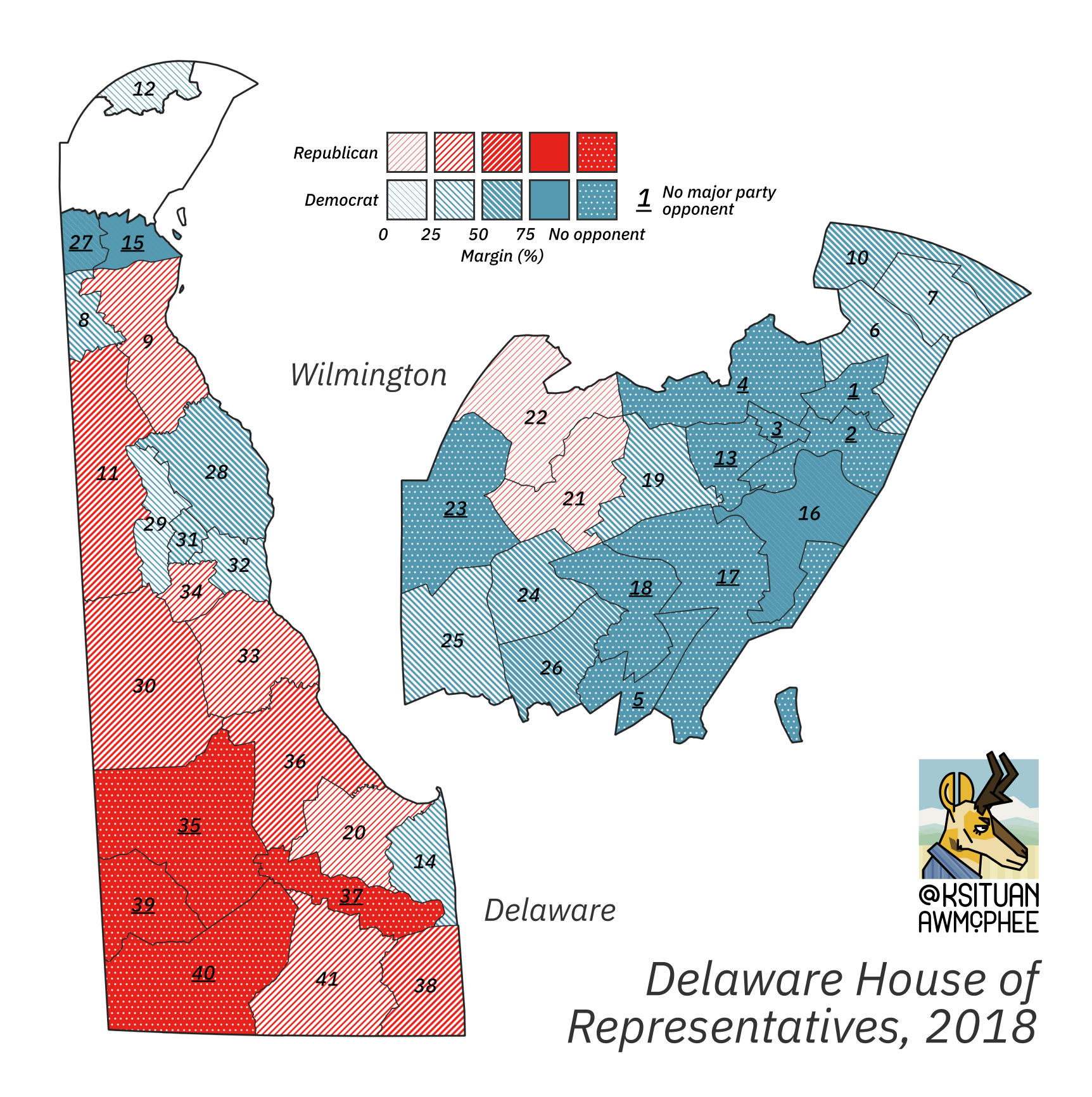
2018 Delaware House of Representatives elections

Half of the seats of the Delaware Senate and all of the seats of the Delaware House of Representatives were up for election in 2018. Democrats retained control of both chambers.

Delaware Senate
Party	Before	After	Change
Democratic	11	12	▲1
Republican	10	9	▼1
Total	21	21	

Delaware House of Representatives
Party	Before	After	Change
Democratic	25	26	▲1
Republican	16	15	▼1
Total	41	41	

=== Florida ===
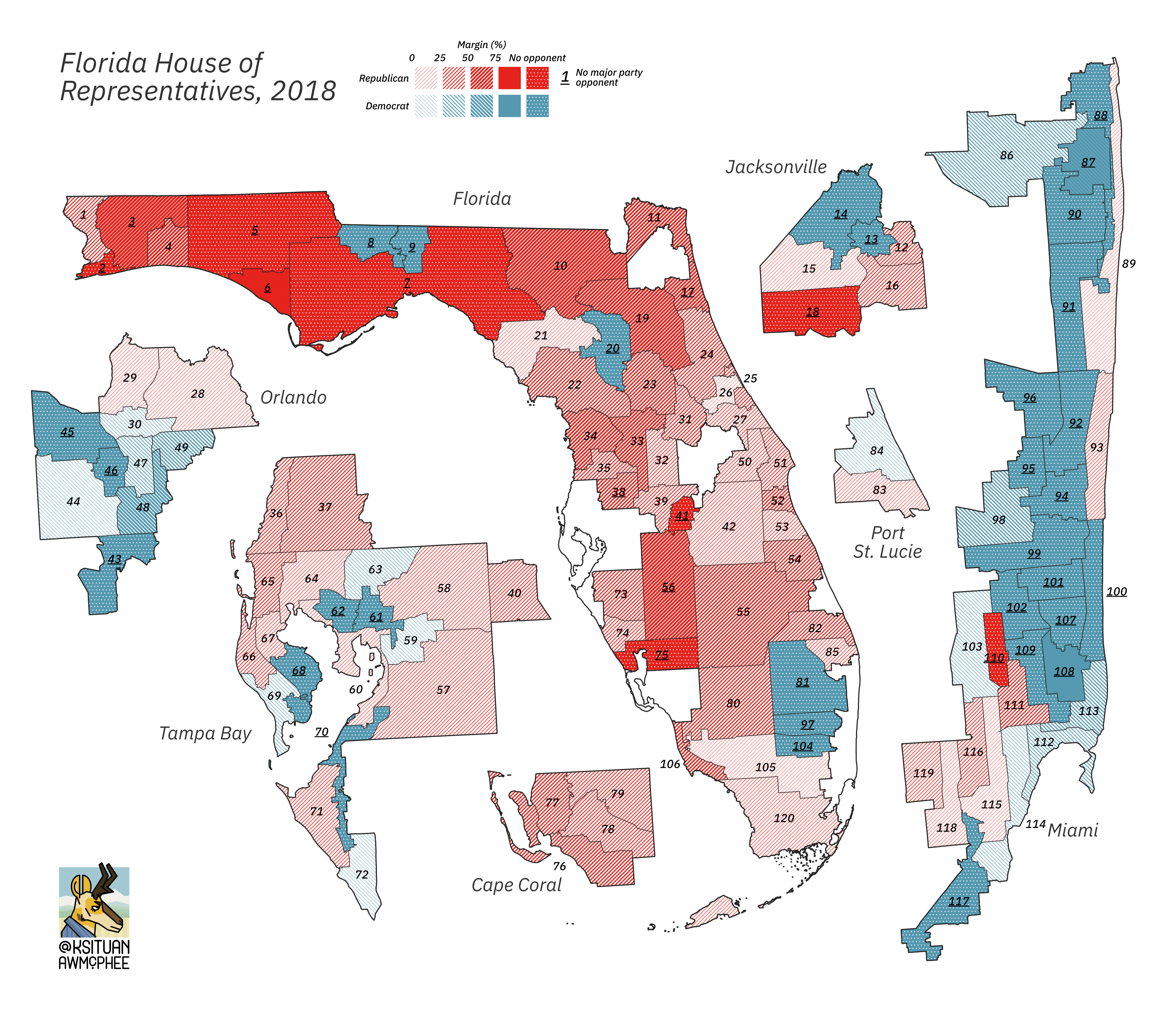
2018 Florida House of Representatives elections

Half of the seats of the Florida Senate and all of the seats of the Florida House of Representatives were up for election in 2018. Republicans retained control of both chambers.

Florida Senate
Party	Before	After	Change
Republican	24	23	▼1
Democratic	16	17	▲1
Total	40	40	

Florida House of Representatives
Party	Before	After	Change
Republican	78	73	▼5
Democratic	42	47	▲5
Total	120	120	

=== Georgia ===
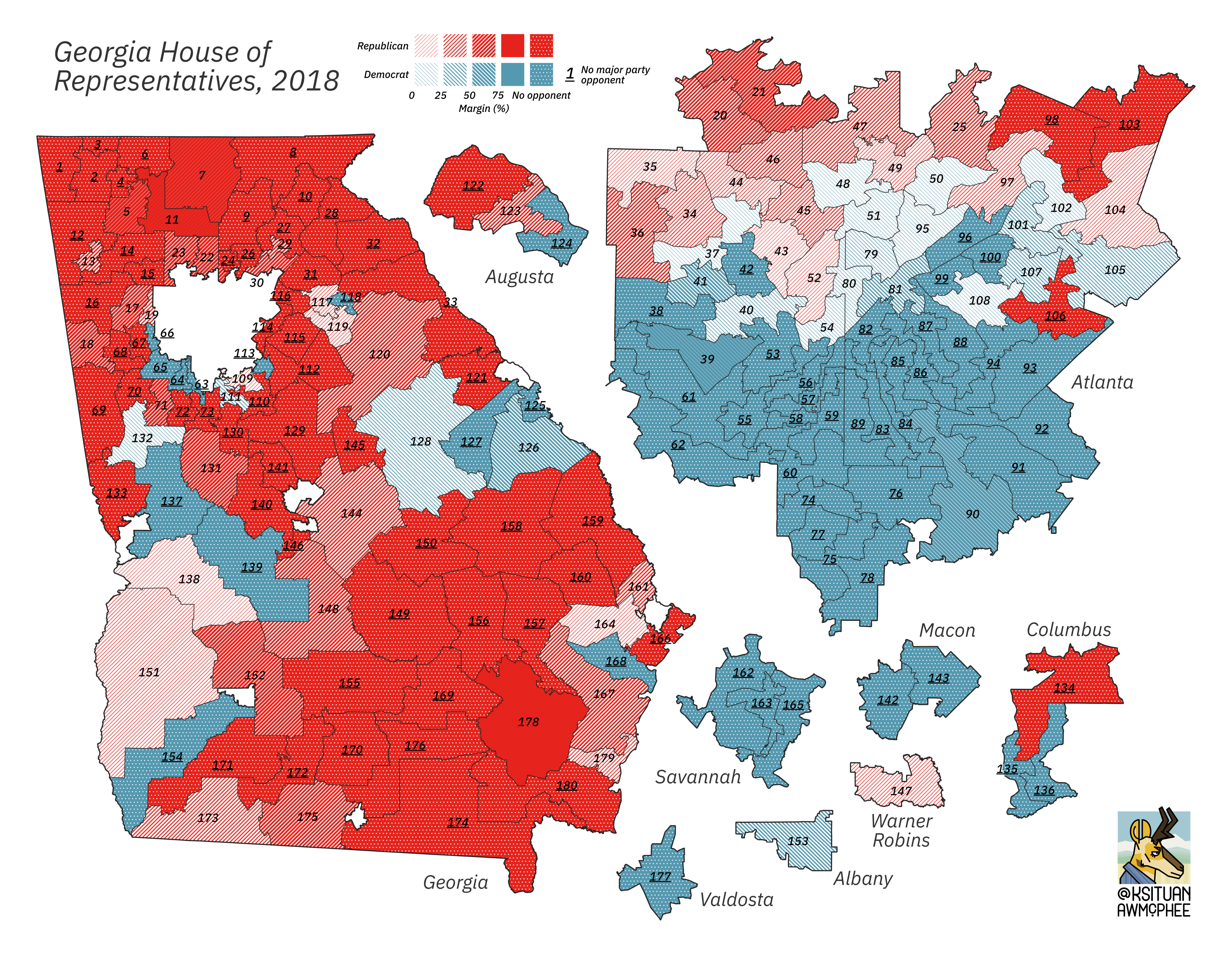
2018 Georgia House of Representatives elections

All of the seats of the Georgia State Senate and the Georgia House of Representatives were up for election in 2018. Republicans retained control of both chambers.

Georgia State Senate
Party	Before	After	Change
Republican	37	35	▼2
Democratic	19	21	▲2
Total	56	56	

Georgia House of Representatives
Party	Before	After	Change
Republican	116	105	▼11
Democratic	64	75	▲11
Total	180	180	

=== Hawaii ===
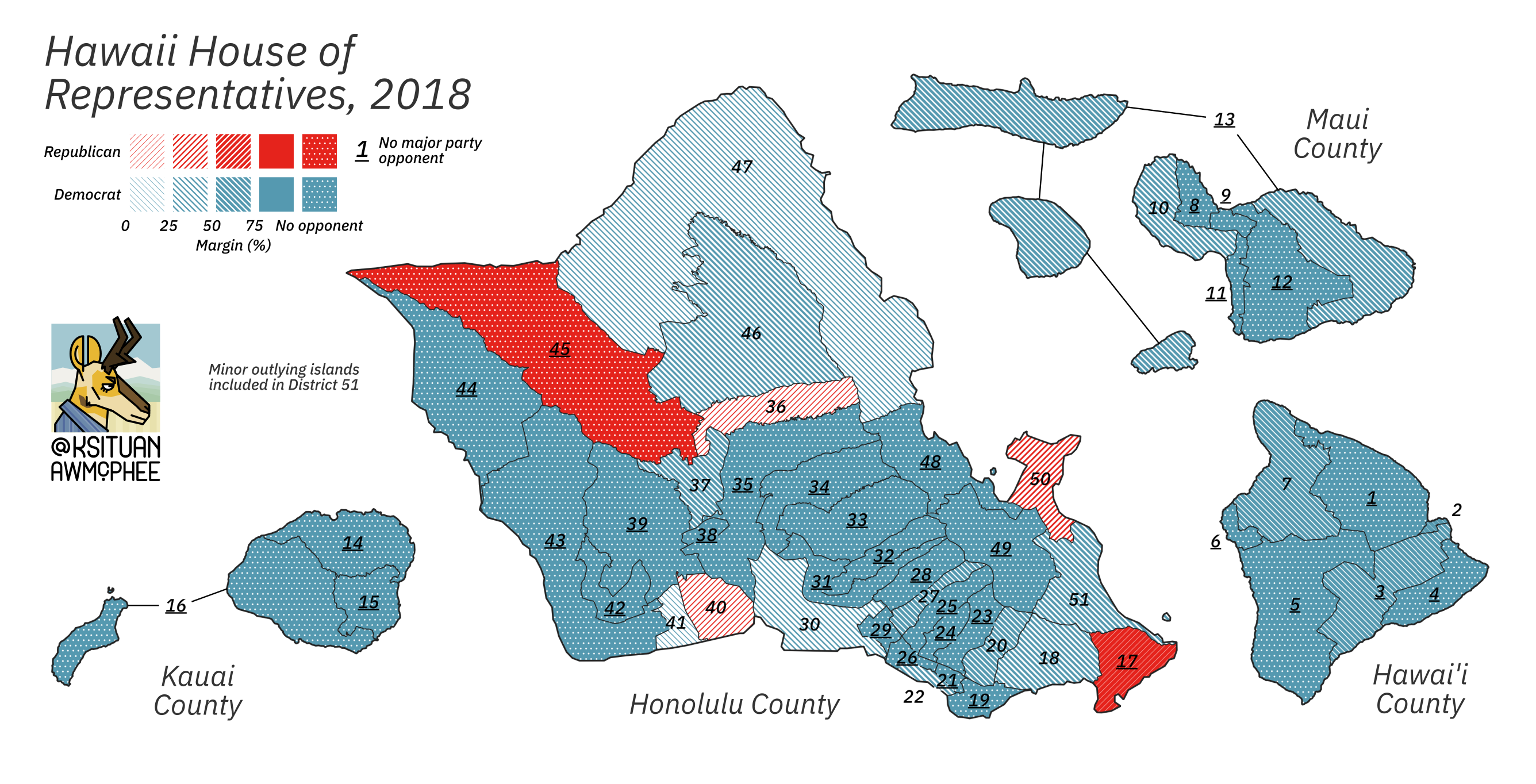
2018 Hawaii House of Representatives elections

Half of the seats of the Hawaii Senate and all of the seats of the Hawaii House of Representatives were up for election in 2018. Democrats retained control of both chambers.

Hawaii Senate
Party	Before	After	Change
Democratic	25	24	▼1
Republican	0	1	▲1
Total	25	25	

Hawaii House of Representatives
Party	Before	After	Change
Democratic	46	46	Steady
Republican	5	5	Steady
Total	51	51	

=== Idaho ===
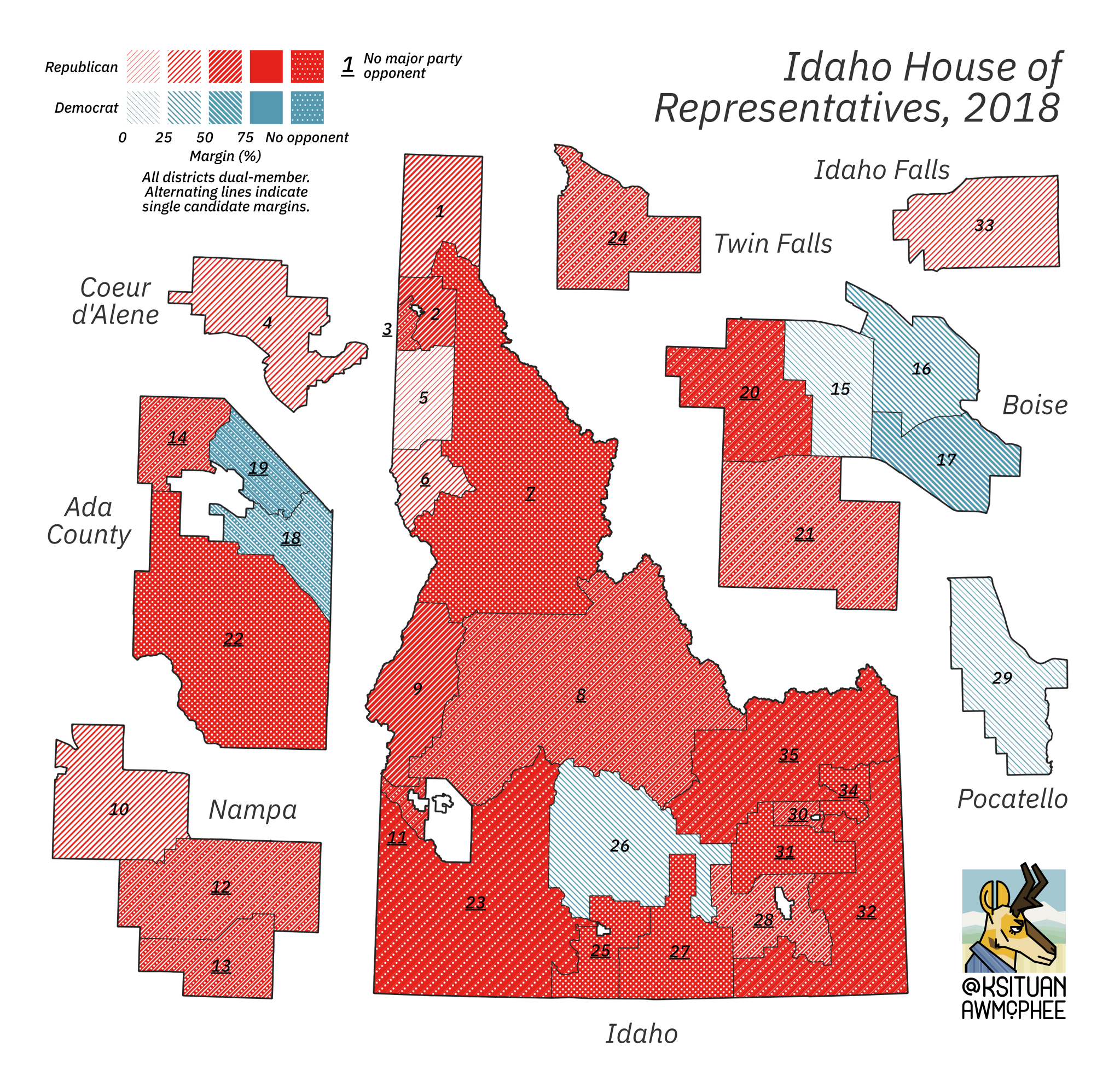
2018 Idaho House of Representatives elections

All of the seats of the Idaho Senate and the Idaho House of Representatives were up for election in 2018. Republicans retained control of both chambers.

Idaho Senate
Party	Before	After	Change
Republican	29	28	▼1
Democratic	6	7	▲1
Total	35	35	

Idaho House of Representatives
Party	Before	After	Change
Republican	59	56	▼3
Democratic	11	14	▲3
Total	70	70	

=== Illinois ===
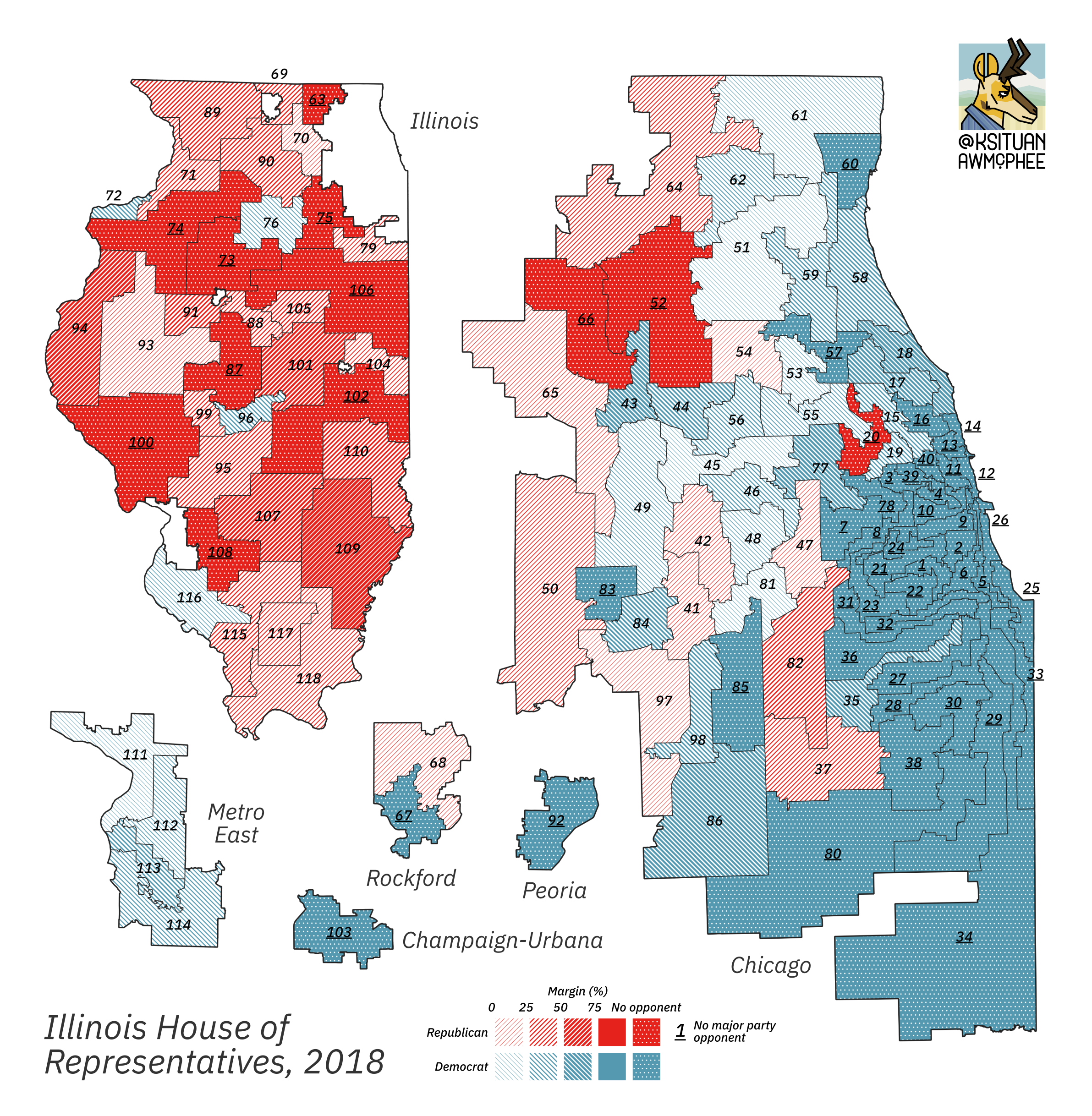
2018 Illinois House of Representatives elections

Two-thirds of the seats of the Illinois Senate and all of the seats of the Illinois House of Representatives were up for election in 2018. Democrats retained control of both chambers.

Illinois Senate
Party	Before	After	Change
Democratic	37	40	▲3
Republican	22	19	▼3
Total	59	59	

Illinois House of Representatives
Party	Before	After	Change
Democratic	67	74	▲7
Republican	51	44	▼7
Total	118	118	

=== Indiana ===
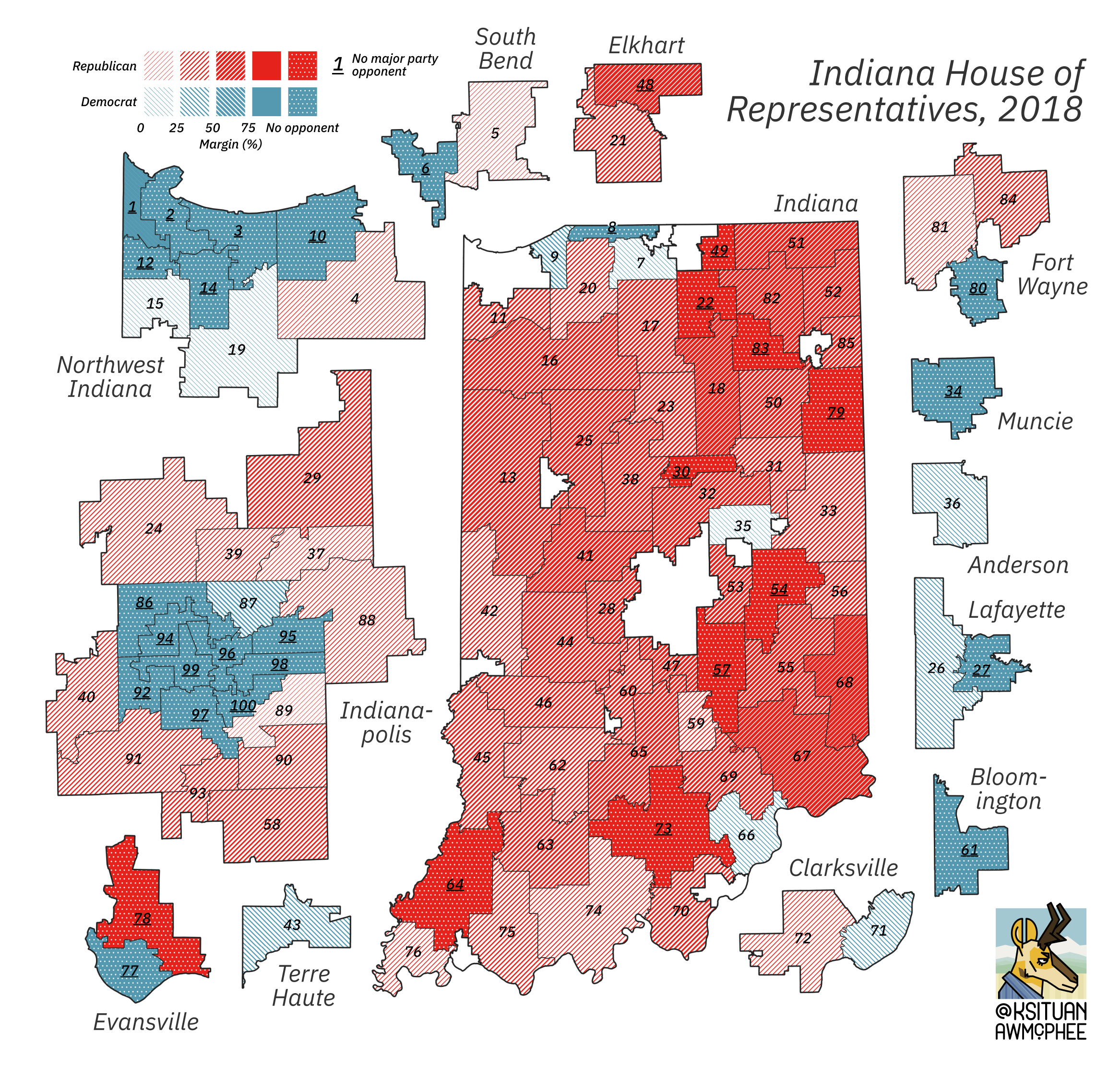
2018 Indiana House of Representatives elections

Half of the seats of the Indiana Senate and all of the seats of the Indiana House of Representatives were up for election in 2018. Republicans retained control of both chambers.

Indiana Senate
Party	Before	After	Change
Republican	41	40	▼1
Democratic	9	10	▲1
Total	50	50	

Indiana House of Representatives
Party	Before	After	Change
Republican	70	67	▼3
Democratic	30	33	▲3
Total	100	100	

=== Iowa ===
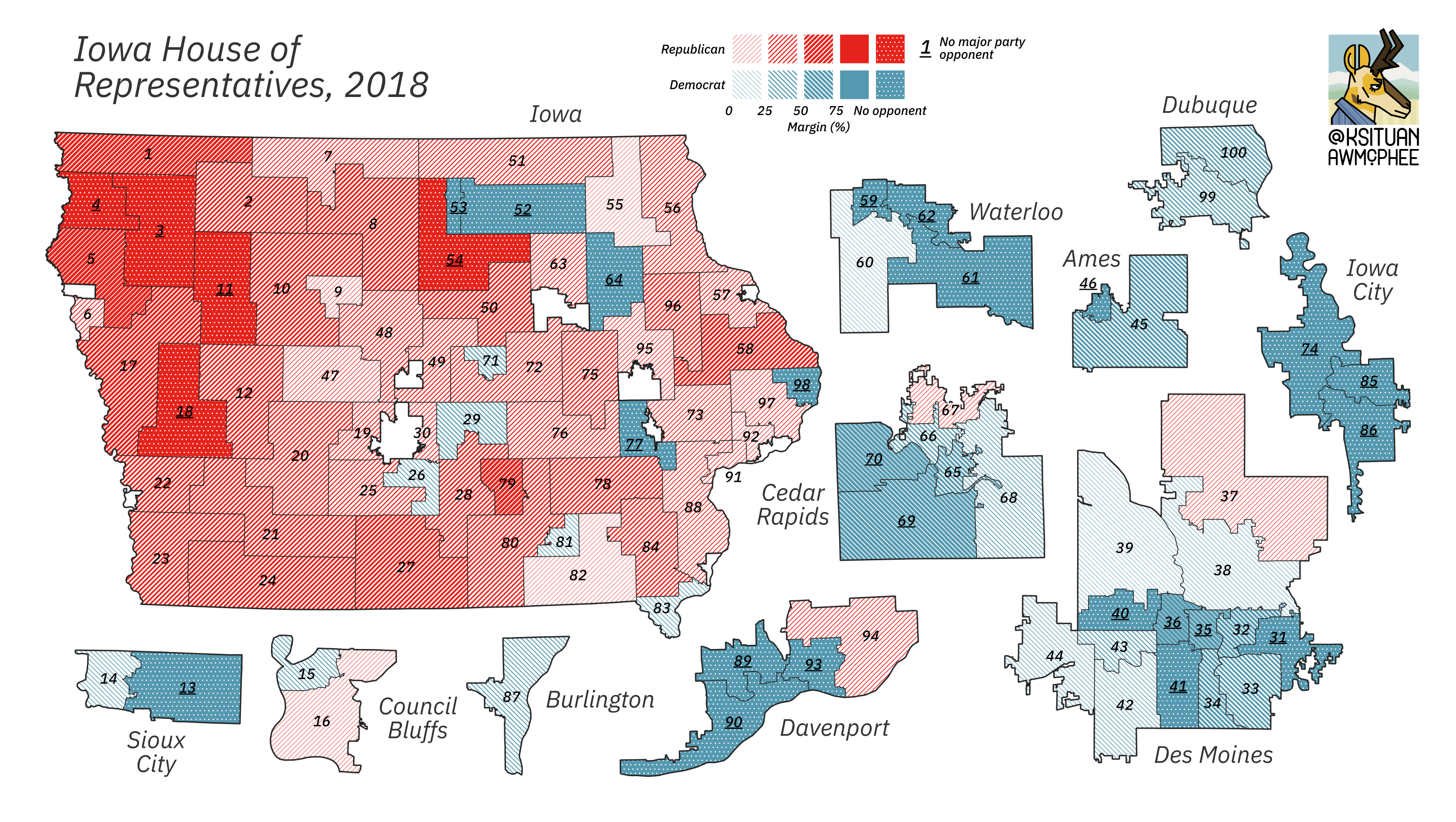
2018 Iowa House of Representatives elections

Half of the seats of the Iowa Senate and all of the seats of the Iowa House of Representatives were up for election in 2018. Republicans retained control of both chambers.

Iowa Senate
Party	Before	After	Change
Republican	29	32	▲3
Democratic	20	18	▼2
Independent	1	0	▼1
Total	50	50	

Iowa House of Representatives
Party	Before	After	Change
Republican	59	53	▼6
Democratic	41	47	▲6
Total	100	100	

=== Kansas ===
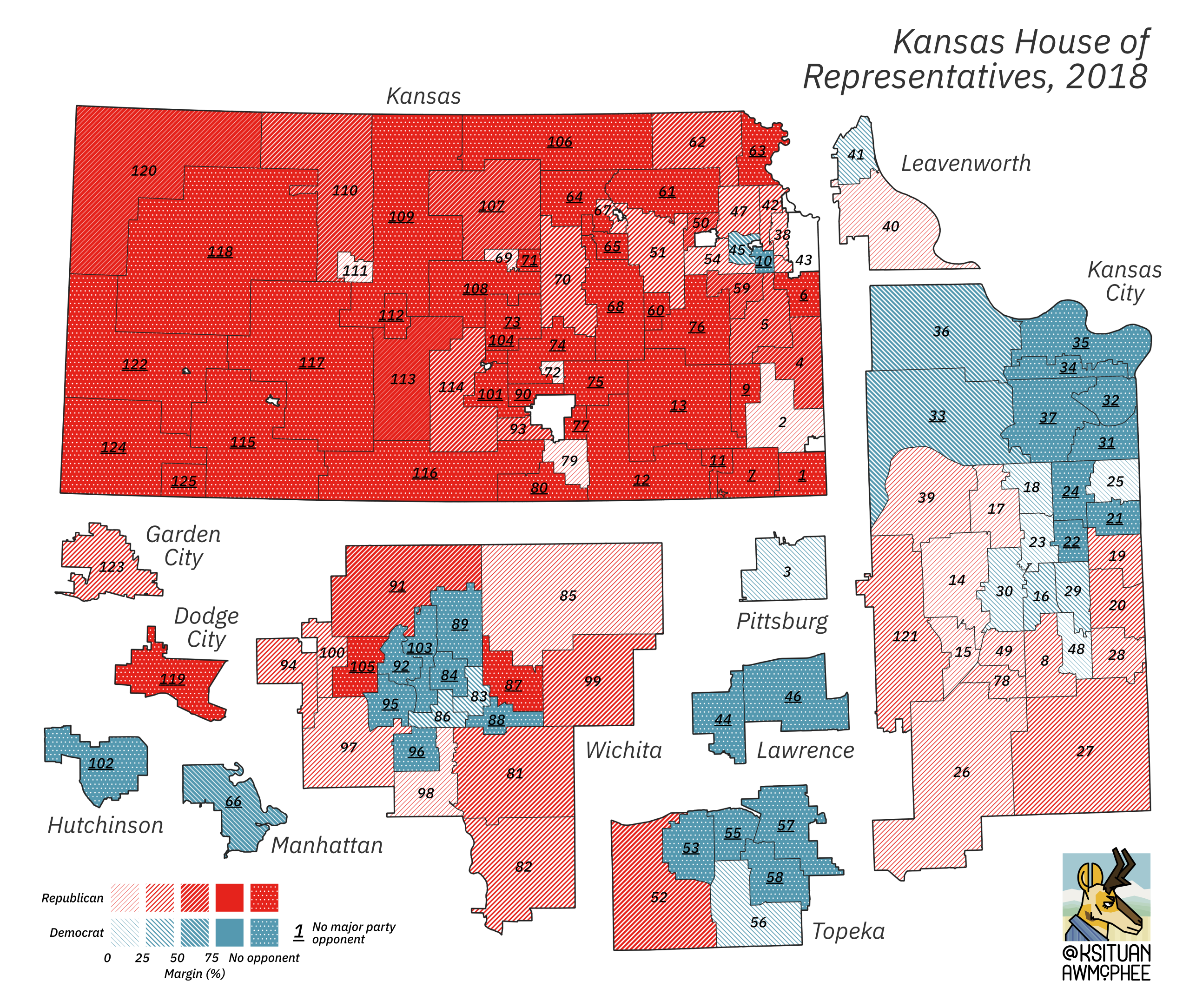
2018 Kansas House of Representatives elections

All of the seats of the Kansas House of Representatives were up for election in 2018; the Republican-controlled Kansas Senate did not hold regularly scheduled elections in 2018. Republicans retained control of the House of Representatives.

Kansas House of Representatives
Party	Before	After	Change
Republican	85	85	Steady
Democratic	40	40	Steady
Total	125	125	

=== Kentucky ===
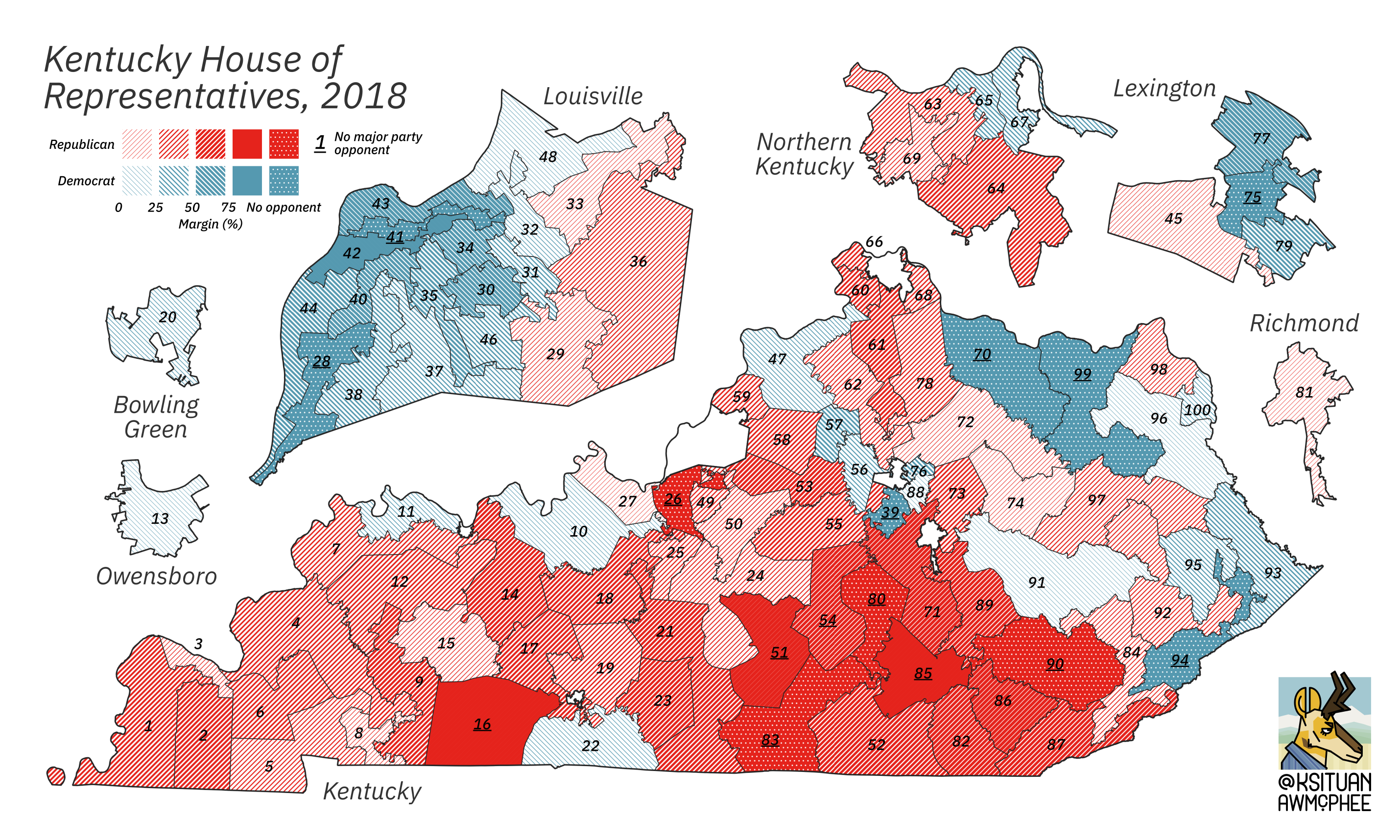
2018 Kentucky House of Representatives elections

Half of the seats of the Kentucky Senate and all of the seats of the Kentucky House of Representatives were up for election in 2018. Republicans retained control of both chambers.

Kentucky Senate
Party	Before	After	Change
Republican	27	28	▲1
Democratic	11	10	▼1
Total	38	38	

Kentucky House of Representatives
Party	Before	After	Change
Republican	63	61	▼2
Democratic	37	39	▲2
Total	100	100	

=== Maine ===
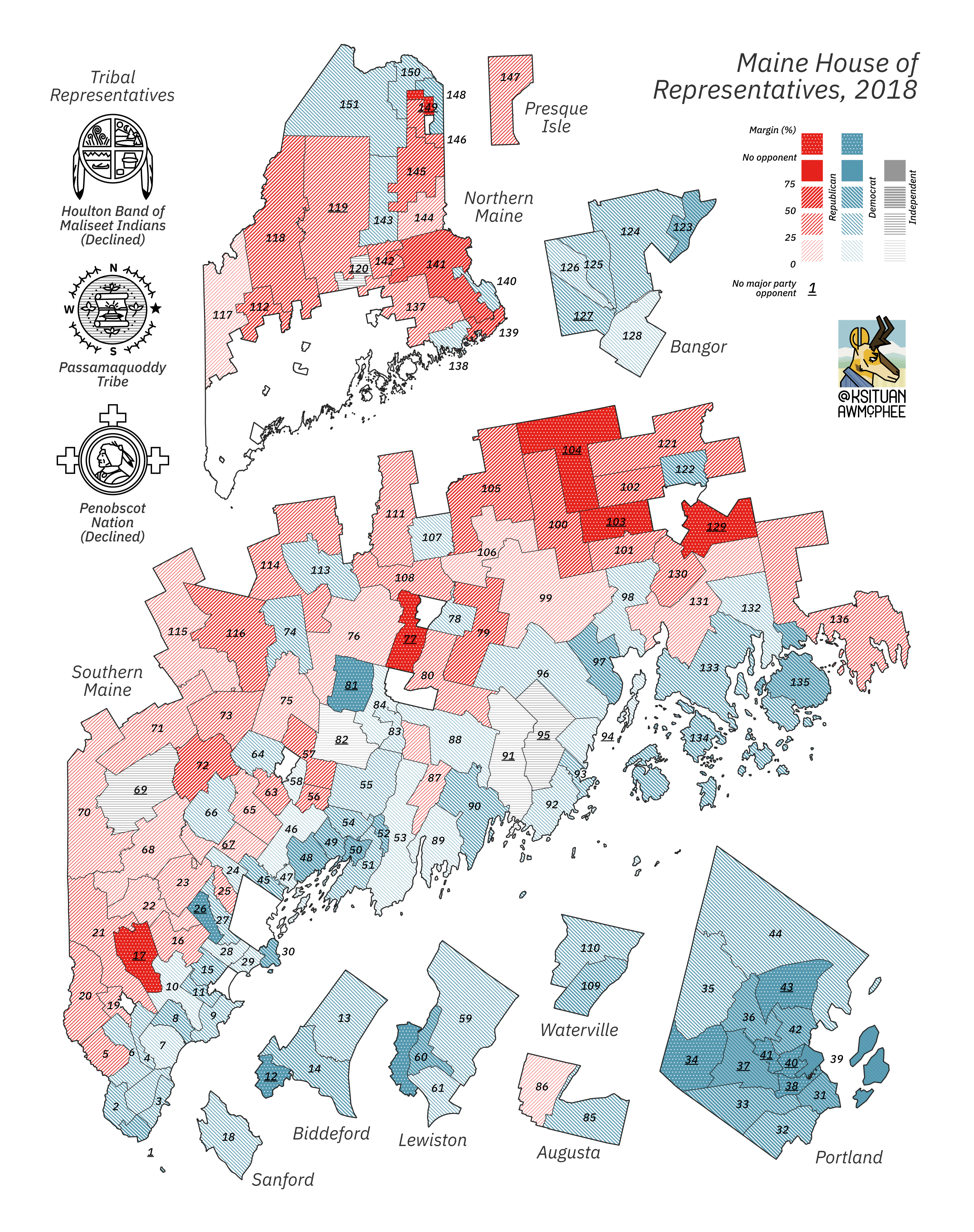
2018 Maine House of Representatives elections

All of the seats of the Maine Senate and the Maine House of Representatives were up for election in 2018. Democrats gained control of the state senate and retained control of the House of Representatives.

Maine Senate
Party	Before	After	Change
Democratic	17	21	▲4
Republican	18	14	▼4
Total	35	35	

Maine House of Representatives
Party	Before	After	Change
Democratic	73	89	▲16
Republican	70	57	▼13
Independent	7	5	▼2
Green	1	0	▼1
Total	151	151	

=== Maryland ===
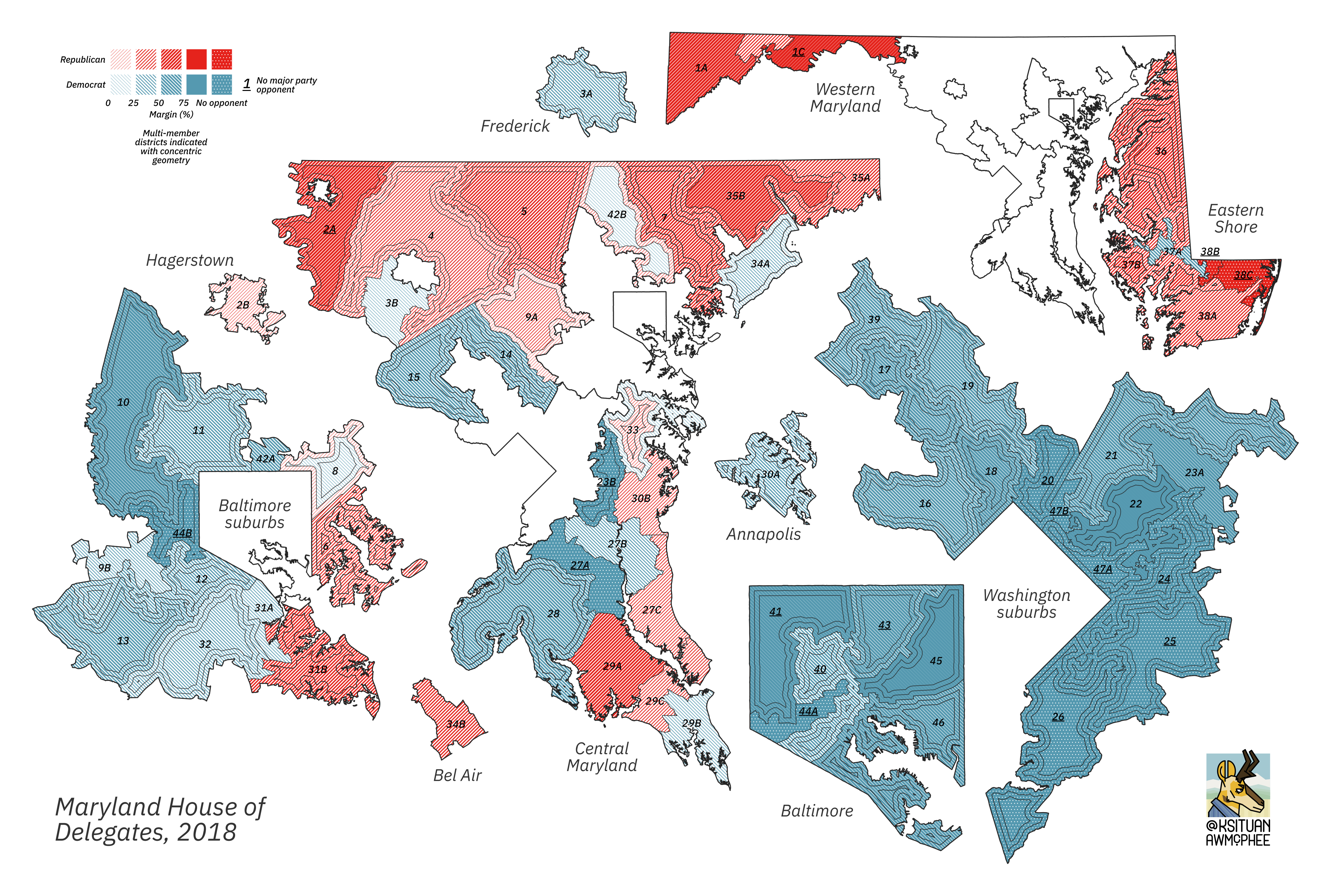
2018 Maryland House of Delegates elections

All of the seats of the Maryland Senate and the Maryland House of Delegates were up for election in 2018. Democrats retained control of both chambers.

Maryland Senate
Party	Before	After	Change
Democratic	33	32	▼1
Republican	14	15	▲1
Total	47	47	

Maryland House of Delegates
Party	Before	After	Change
Democratic	92	99	▲7
Republican	49	42	▼7
Total	141	141	

=== Massachusetts ===
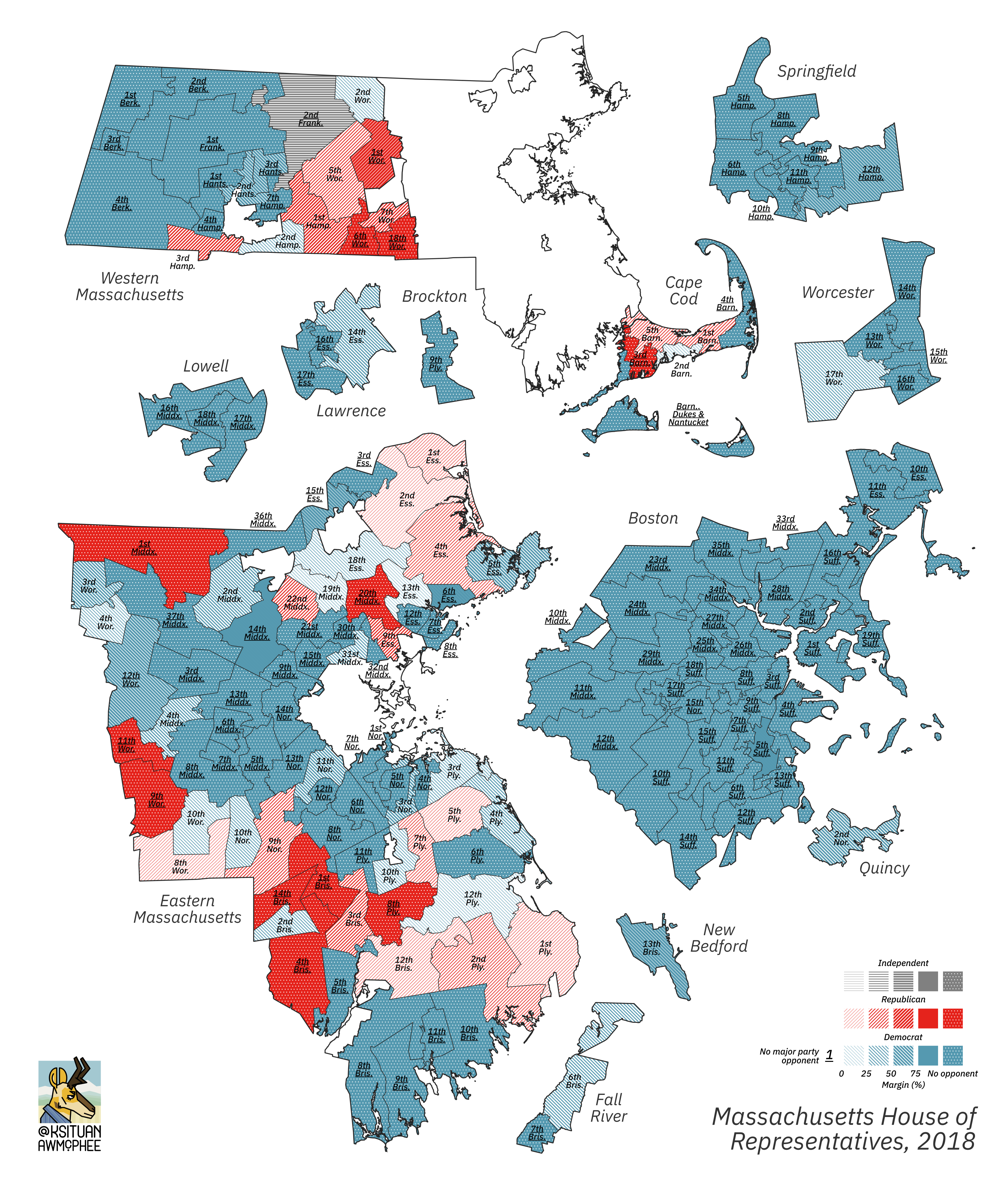
2018 Massachusetts House of Representatives elections

All of the seats of the Massachusetts Senate and the Massachusetts House of Representatives were up for election in 2018. Democrats control both chambers, and the governor is a member of the Republican Party. Democrats hold a veto-proof supermajority in the state legislature.

Massachusetts Senate
Party	Before	After	Change
Democratic	33	34	▲1
Republican	7	6	▼1
Total	40	40	

Massachusetts House of Representatives
Party	Before	After	Change
Democratic	125	127	▲2
Republican	34	32	▼2
Independent	1	1	Steady
Total	160	160	

=== Michigan ===
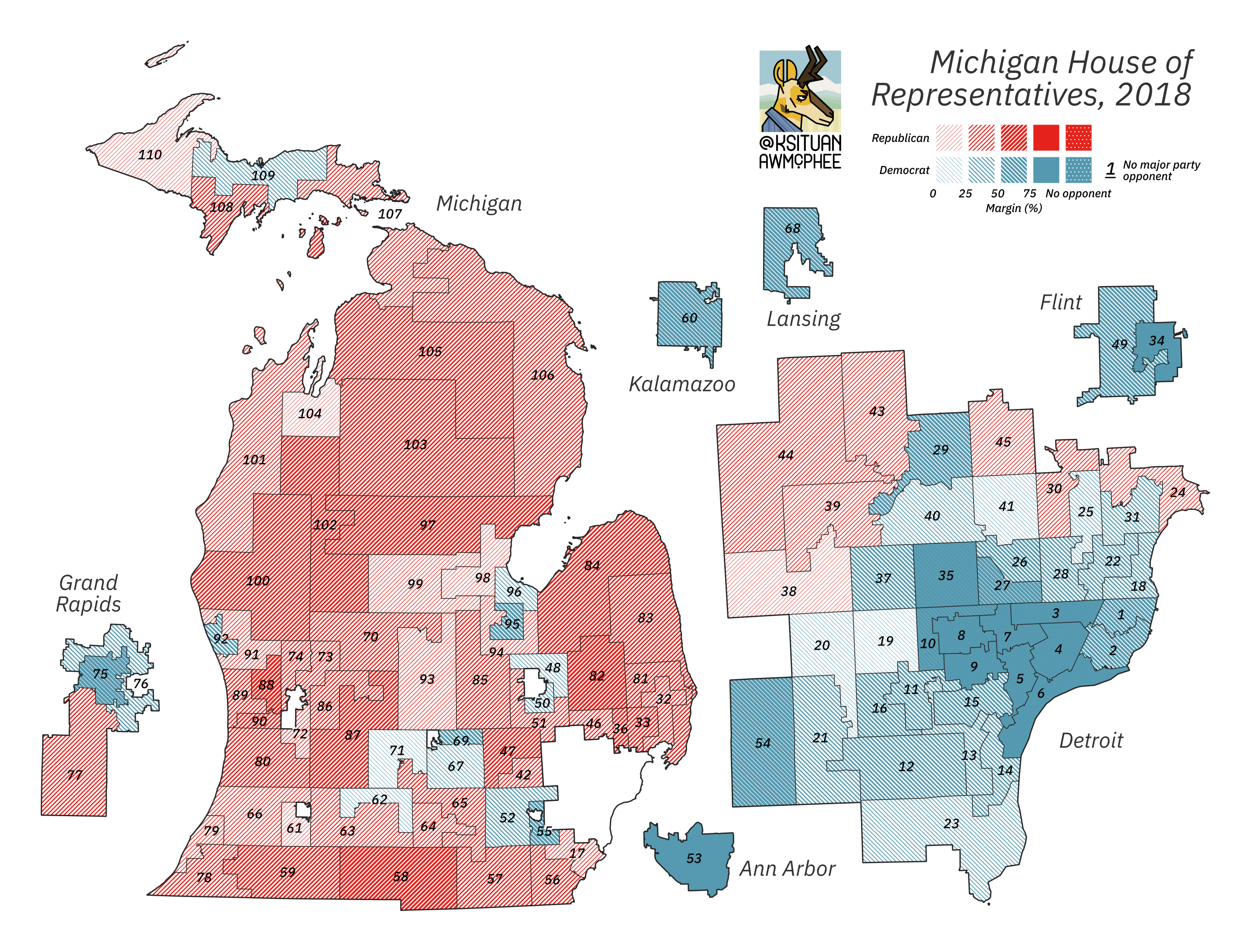
2018 Michigan House of Representatives elections

All of the seats of the Michigan Senate and the Michigan House of Representatives were up for election in 2018. Republicans retained control of both chambers, but Democrats picked up enough seats to break the Republican legislative supermajority.

Michigan Senate
Party	Before	After	Change
Republican	27	22	▼5
Democratic	11	16	▲5
Total	110	110	

Michigan House of Representatives
Party	Before	After	Change
Republican	63	58	▼5
Democratic	47	52	▲5
Total	110	110	

=== Minnesota ===
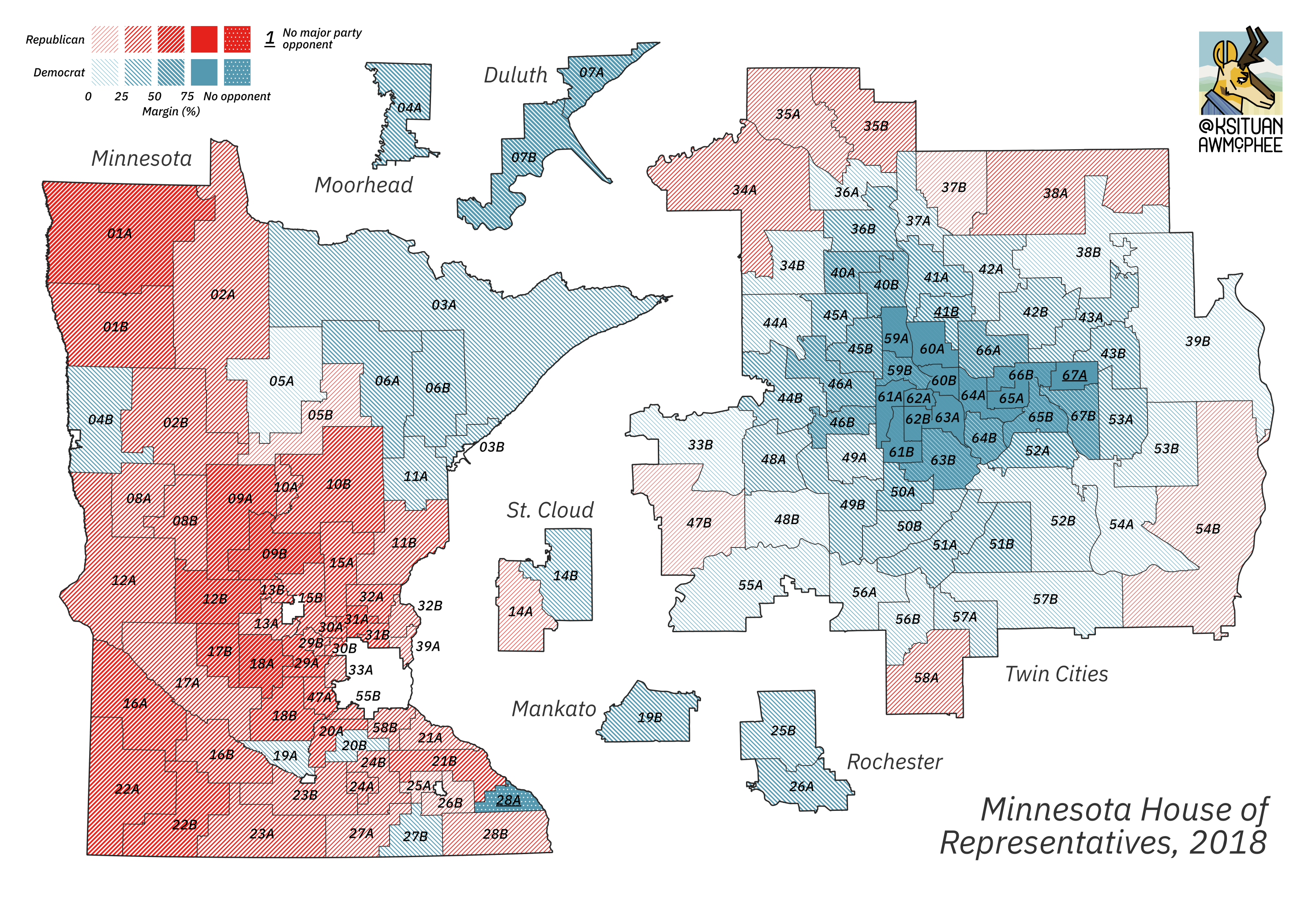
2018 Minnesota House of Representatives elections

All of the seats of the Minnesota House of Representatives were up for election in 2018; the Republican-controlled Minnesota Senate did not hold regularly scheduled elections in 2018. Democrats won control of the House of Representatives, making Minnesota the only state in the country where each major party controlled one state legislative chamber.

Minnesota House of Representatives
Party	Before	After	Change
Democratic (DFL)	57	75	▲18
Republican	77	59	▼18
Total	134	134	

=== Missouri ===
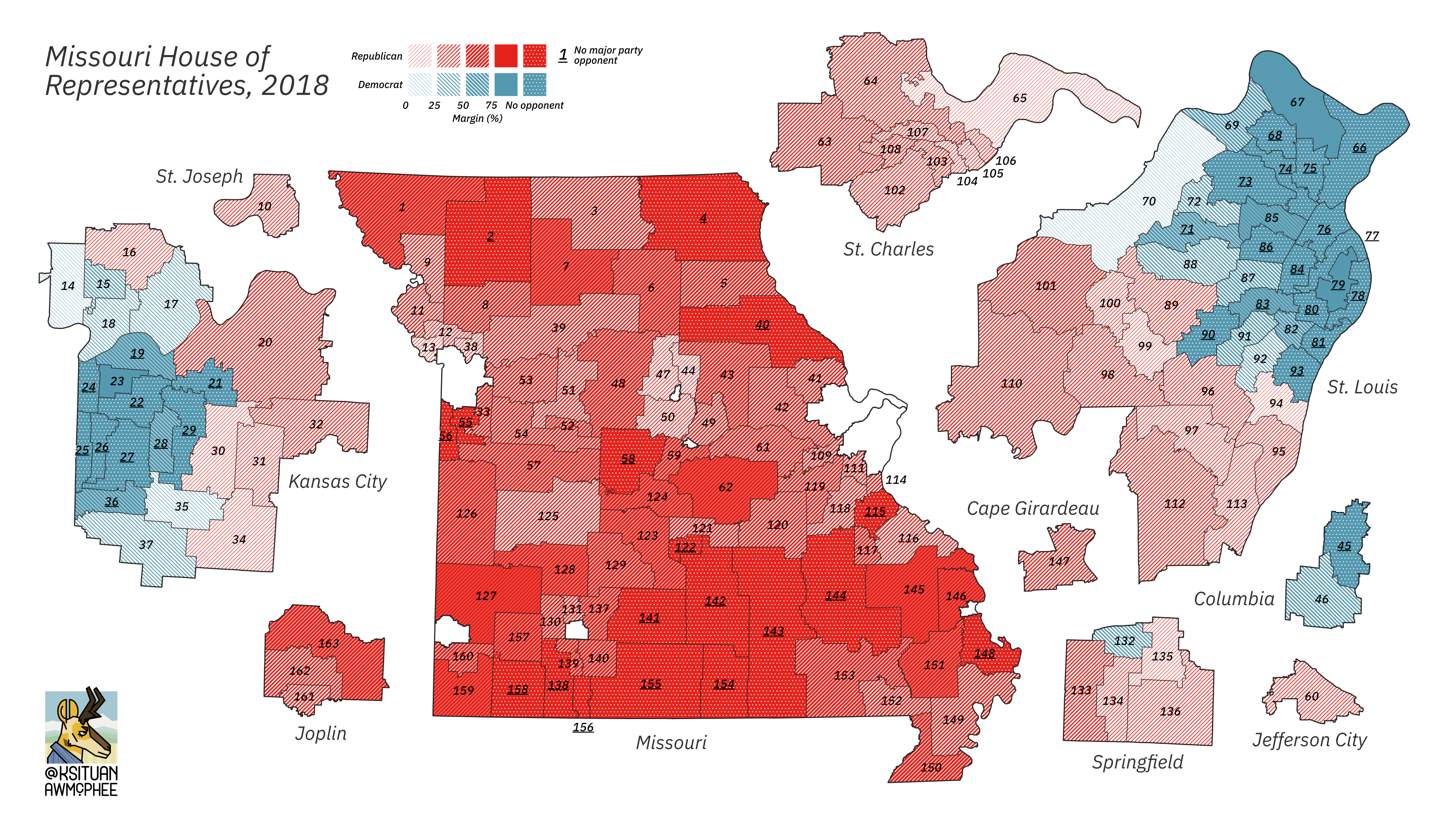
2018 Missouri House of Representatives elections

Half of the seats of the Missouri Senate and all of the seats of the Missouri House of Representatives were up for election in 2018. Republicans retained control of both chambers.

Missouri Senate
Party	Before	After	Change
Republican	24	24	Steady
Democratic	10	10	Steady
Total	34	34	

Missouri House of Representatives
Party	Before	After	Change
Republican	117	116	▼1
Democratic	46	47	▲1
Total	163	163	

=== Montana ===
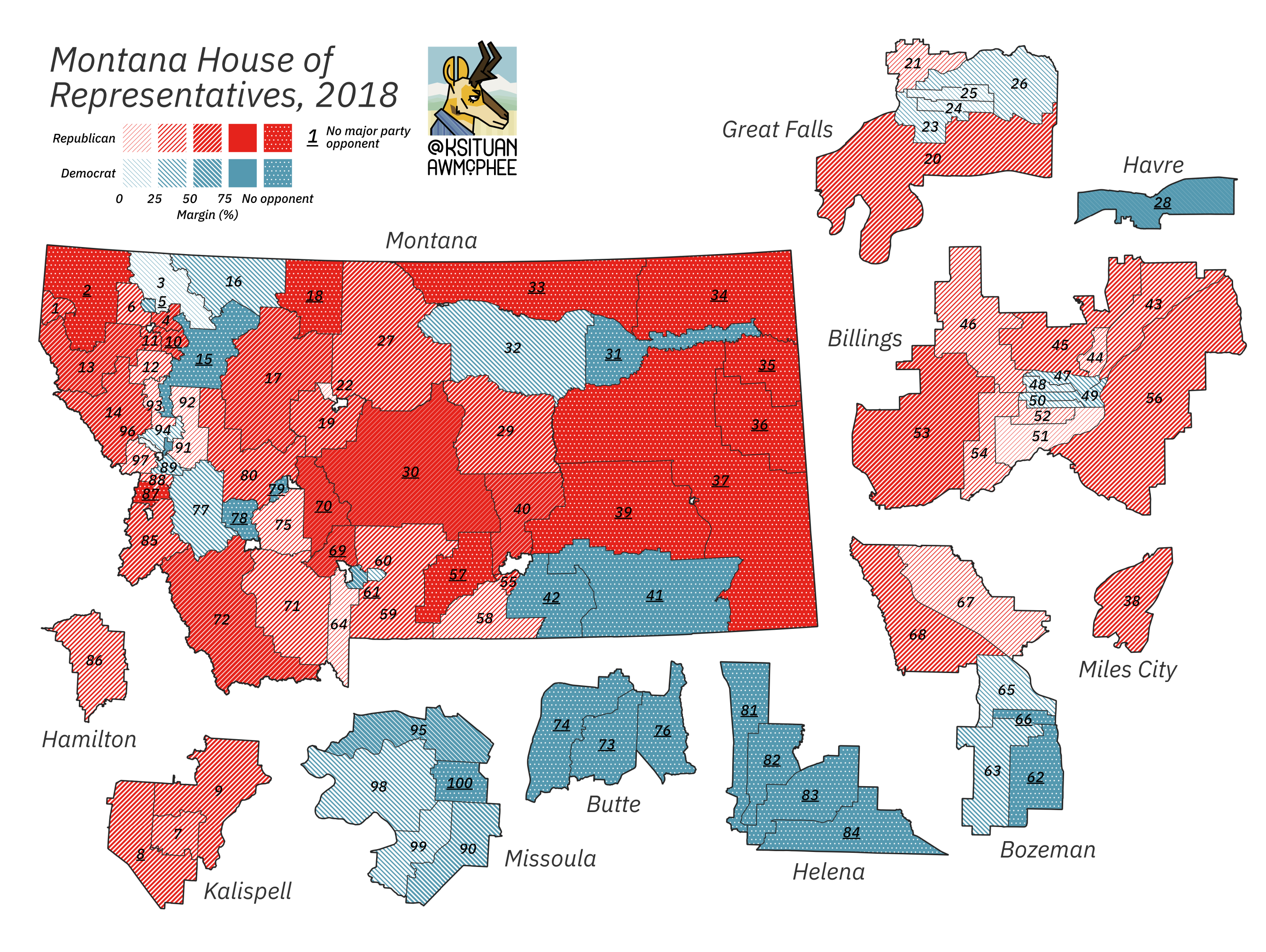
2018 Montana House of Representatives elections

Half of the seats of the Montana Senate and all of the seats of the Montana House of Representatives were up for election in 2018. Republicans retained control of both chambers.

Montana Senate
Party	Before	After	Change
Republican	32	30	▼2
Democratic	18	20	▲2
Total	50	50	

Montana House of Representatives
Party	Before	After	Change
Republican	59	58	▼1
Democratic	41	42	▲1
Total	100	100	

=== Nebraska ===
Nebraska is the only U.S. state with a unicameral legislature; half of the seats of the Nebraska Legislature were up for election in 2018. Nebraska is also unique in that its legislature is officially non-partisan and holds non-partisan elections, although the Democratic and Republican parties each endorse legislative candidates. Republicans maintained control.

Nebraska Legislature
Party	Before	After	Change
Republican	31	30	▼1
Democratic	16	18	▲2
Independent	1	1	Steady
Libertarian	1	0	▼1
Total	49	49	

=== Nevada ===
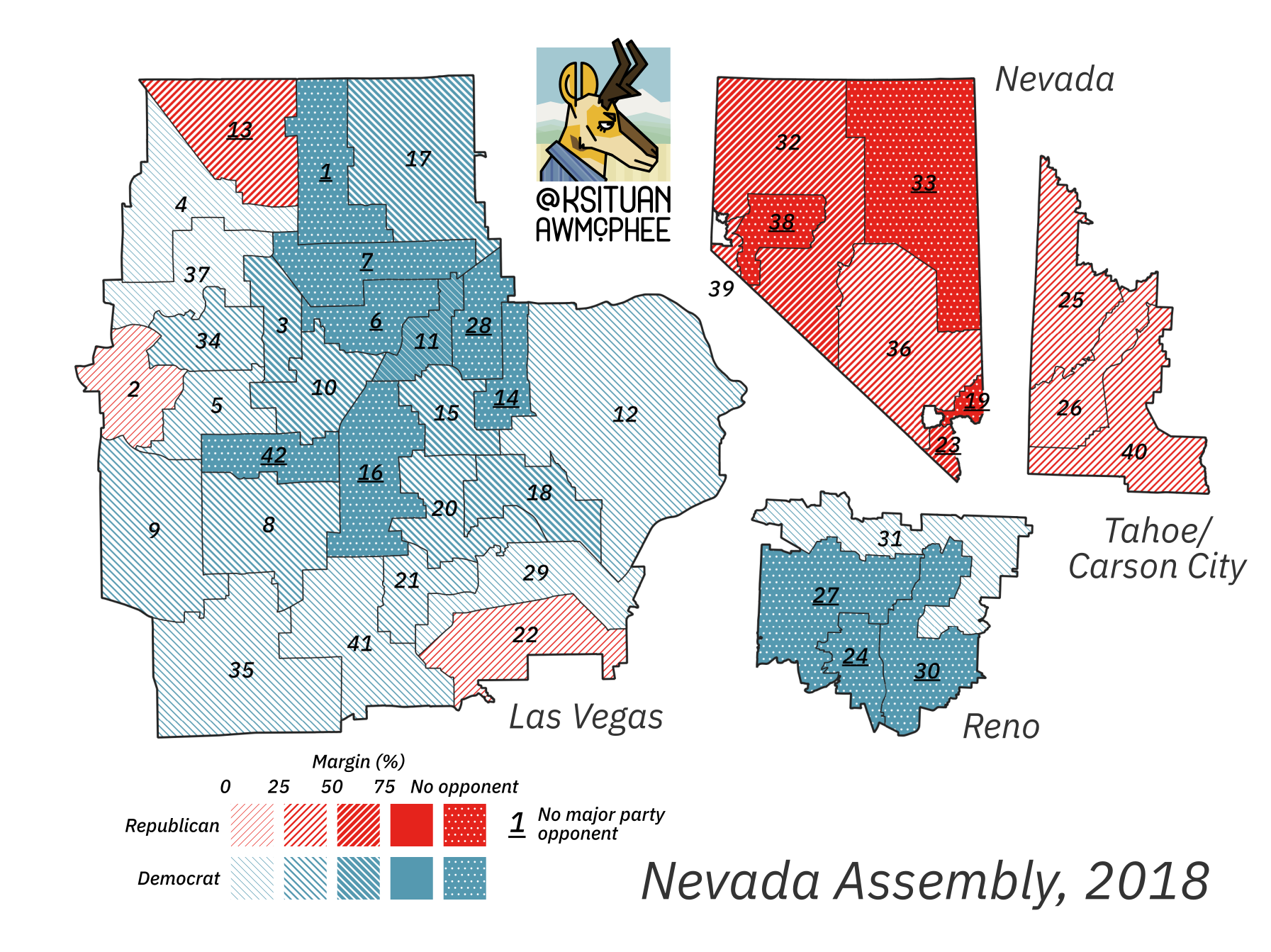
2018 Nevada Assembly elections

Half of the seats of the Nevada Senate and all of the seats of the Nevada Assembly were up for election in 2018. Democrats retained control of both chambers.

Nevada Senate
Party	Before	After	Change
Democratic	11	13	▲2
Independent	1	0	▼1
Republican	9	8	▼1
Total	21	21	

Nevada Assembly
Party	Before	After	Change
Democratic	27	29	▲2
Republican	15	13	▼2
Total	42	42	

=== New Hampshire ===
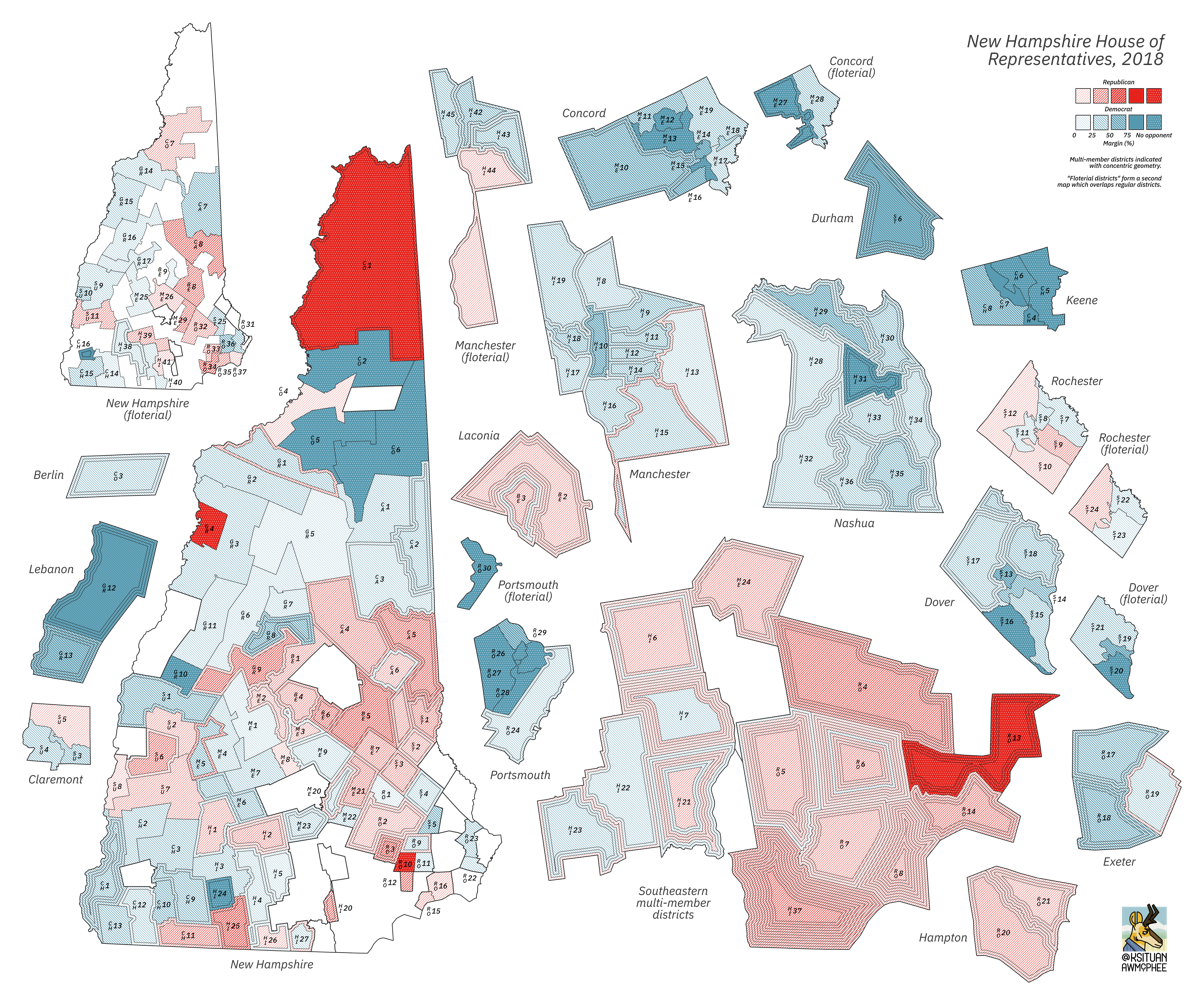
2018 New Hampshire House of Representatives elections

All of the seats of the New Hampshire Senate and the New Hampshire House of Representatives were up for election in 2018. Democrats won control of both chambers.

New Hampshire Senate
Party	Before	After	Change
Democratic	10	14	▲4
Republican	14	10	▼4
Total	24	24	

New Hampshire House of Representatives
Party	Before	After	Change
Democratic	173	234	▲61
Republican	227	166	▼61
Total	400	400	

=== New Mexico ===
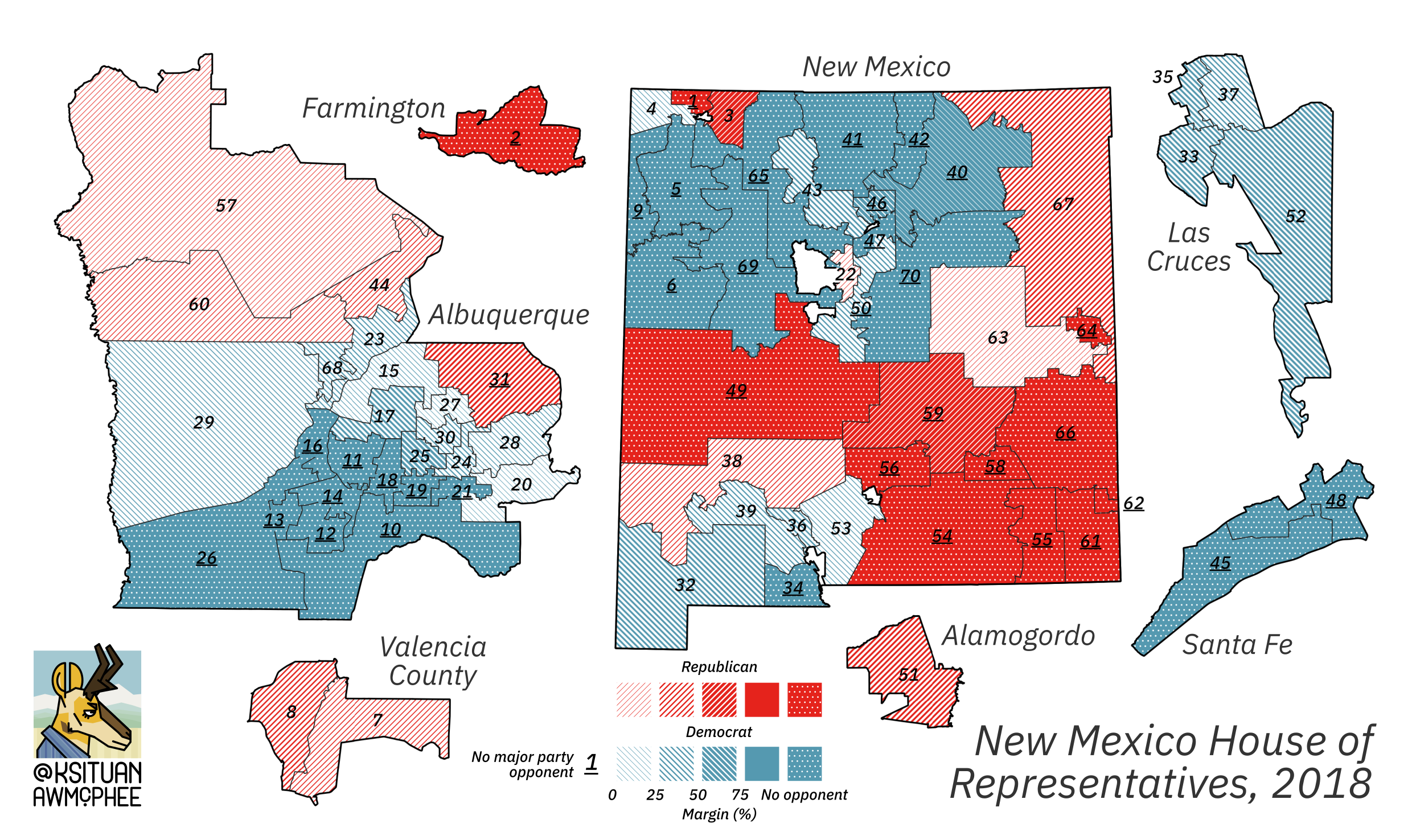
2018 New Mexico House of Representatives elections

All of the seats of the New Mexico House of Representatives were up for election in 2018; the Democratic-controlled New Mexico Senate did not hold regularly scheduled elections in 2018. Democrats retained control of the House of Representatives.

New Mexico House of Representatives
Party	Before	After	Change
Democratic	39	46	▲7
Republican	31	24	▼7
Total	70	70	

=== New York ===
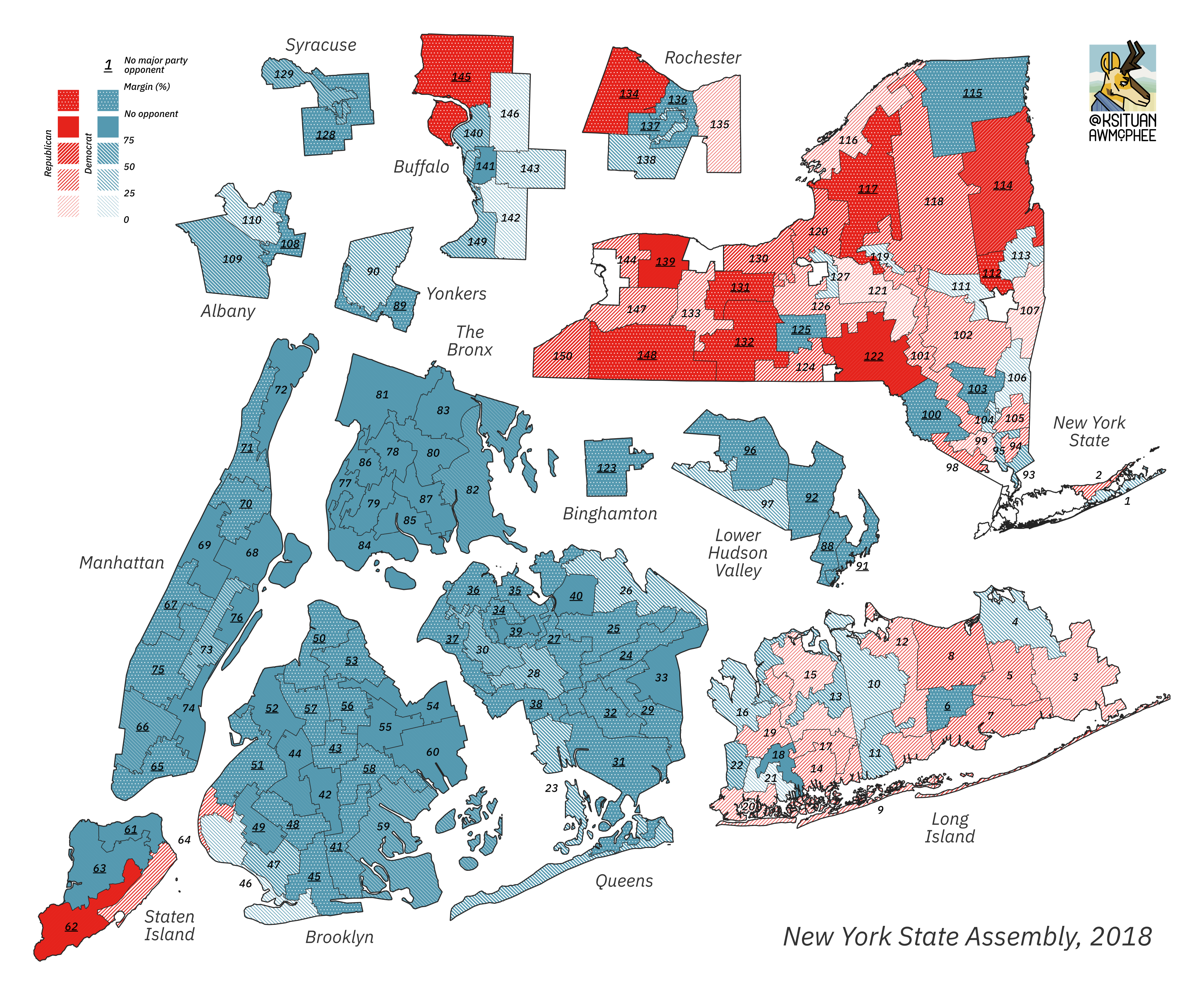
2018 New York State Assembly elections

All of the seats of the New York State Senate and the New York State Assembly were up for election in 2018. Democrats won control of the state senate and retained control of the state assembly.

New York State Senate
Party	Before	After	Change
Democratic	31	39	▲8
Democratic	1 (Note: Democrat Simcha Felder caucused with the Republicans until after the elections.)	1	Steady
Republican	31	23	▼8
Total	63	63	

New York State Assembly
Party	Before	After	Change
Democratic	107	106	▼1
Republican	42	43	▲1
Independence	1	1	Steady
Total	150	150	

=== North Carolina ===
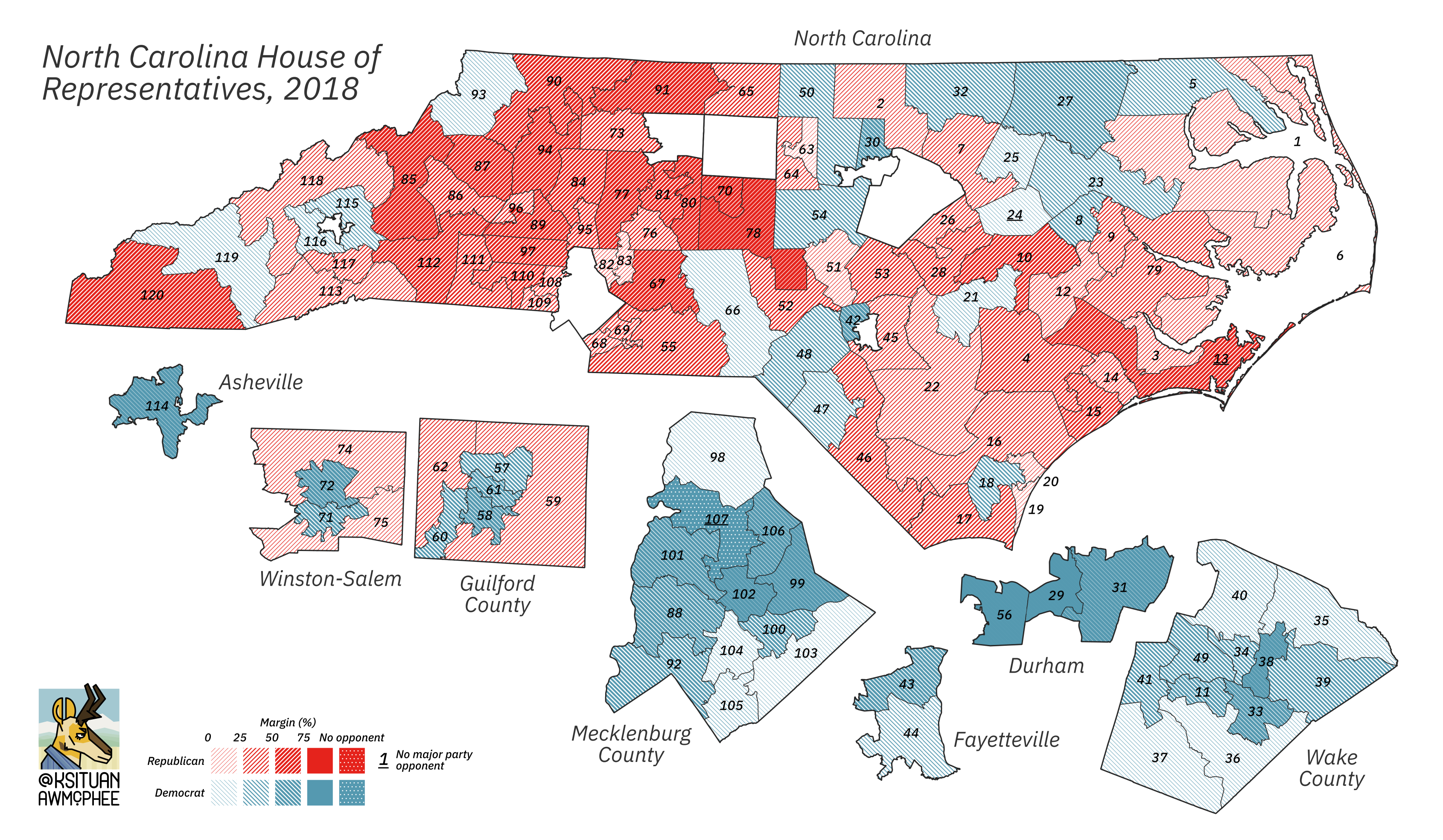
2018 North Carolina House of Representatives elections

All of the seats of the North Carolina Senate and the North Carolina House of Representatives were up for election in 2018. Republicans retained control of both chambers, but Democrats won enough seats to break the Republican legislative super-majority.

North Carolina Senate
Party	Before	After	Change
Republican	35	29	▼6
Democratic	15	21	▲6
Total	50	50	

North Carolina House of Representatives
Party	Before	After	Change
Republican	75	65	▼10
Democratic	45	55	▲10
Total	120	120	

=== North Dakota ===
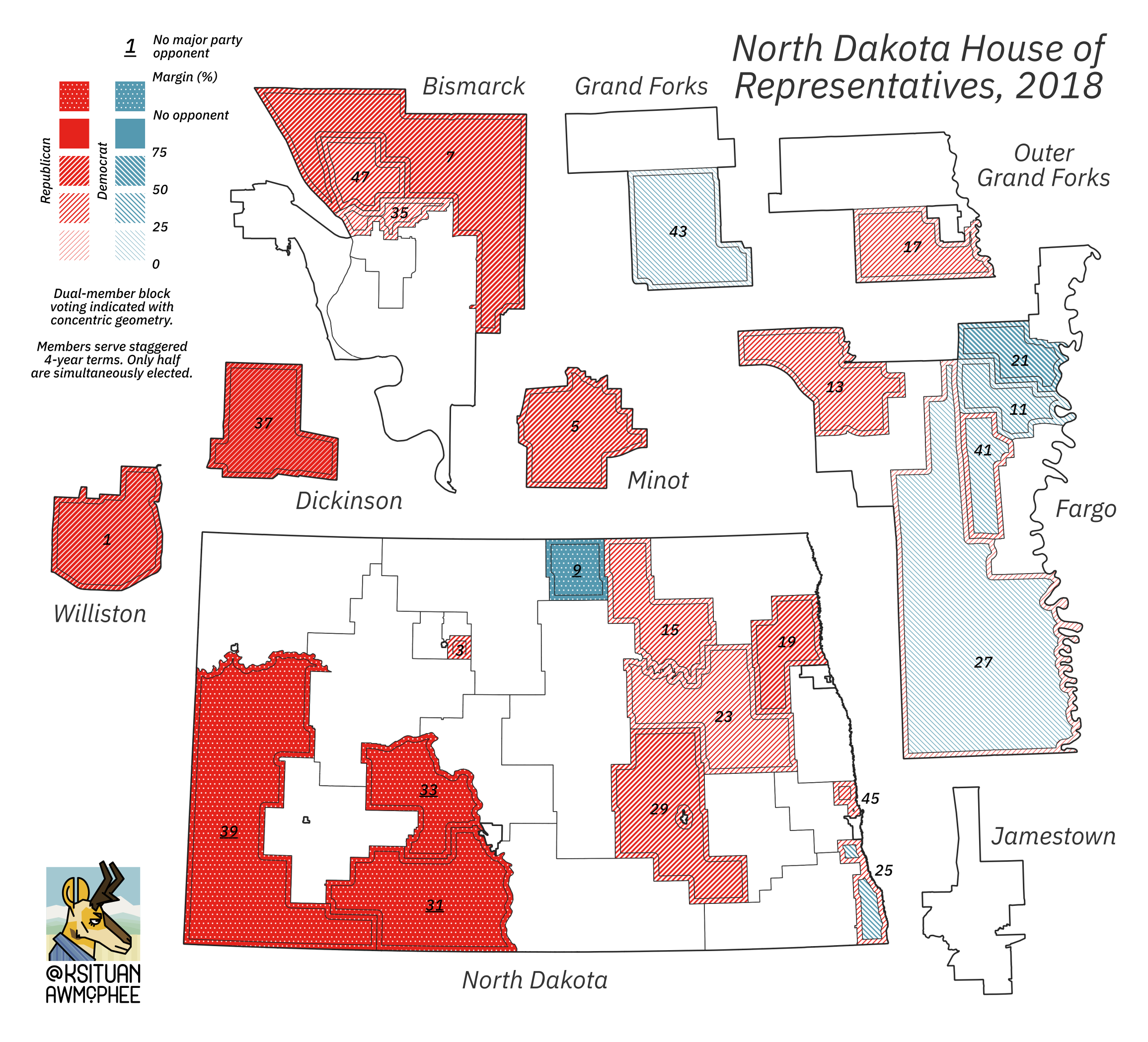
2018 North Dakota House of Representatives elections

Half of the seats of the North Dakota Senate and the North Dakota House of Representatives were up for election in 2018. Republicans retained control of both chambers.

North Dakota Senate
Party	Before	After	Change
Republican	38	37	▼1
Democratic-NPL	9	10	▲1
Total	47	47	

North Dakota House of Representatives
Party	Before	After	Change
Republican	81	79	▼2
Democratic-NPL	13	15	▲2
Total	94	94	

=== Ohio ===
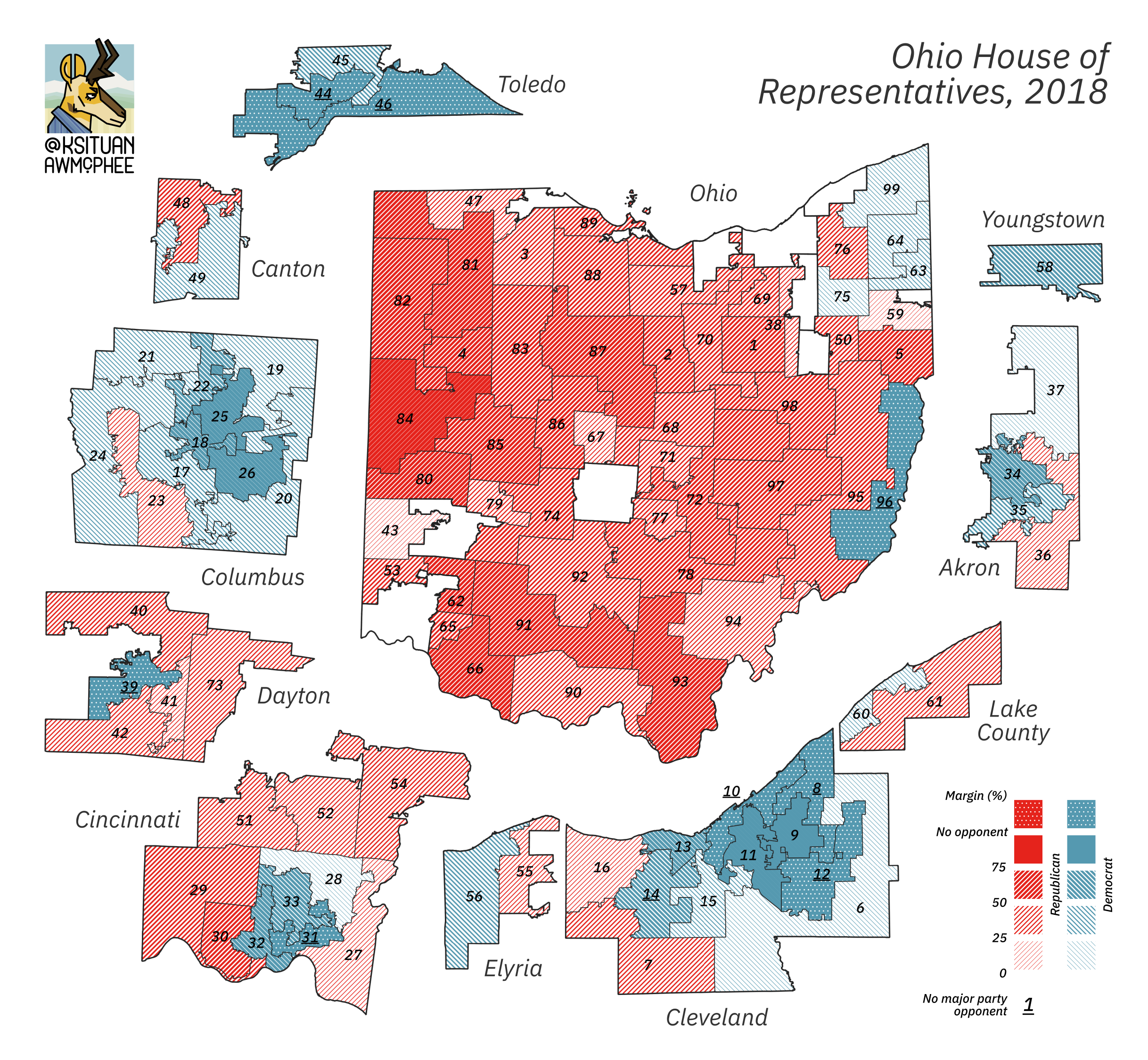
2018 Ohio House of Representatives elections

Half of the seats of the Ohio Senate and all of the seats of the Ohio House of Representatives were up for election in 2018. Republicans retained control of both chambers.

Ohio Senate
Party	Before	After	Change
Republican	24	24	Steady
Democratic	9	9	Steady
Total	33	33	

Ohio House of Representatives
Party	Before	After	Change
Republican	66	61	▼5
Democratic	33	38	▲5
Total	99	99	

=== Oklahoma ===
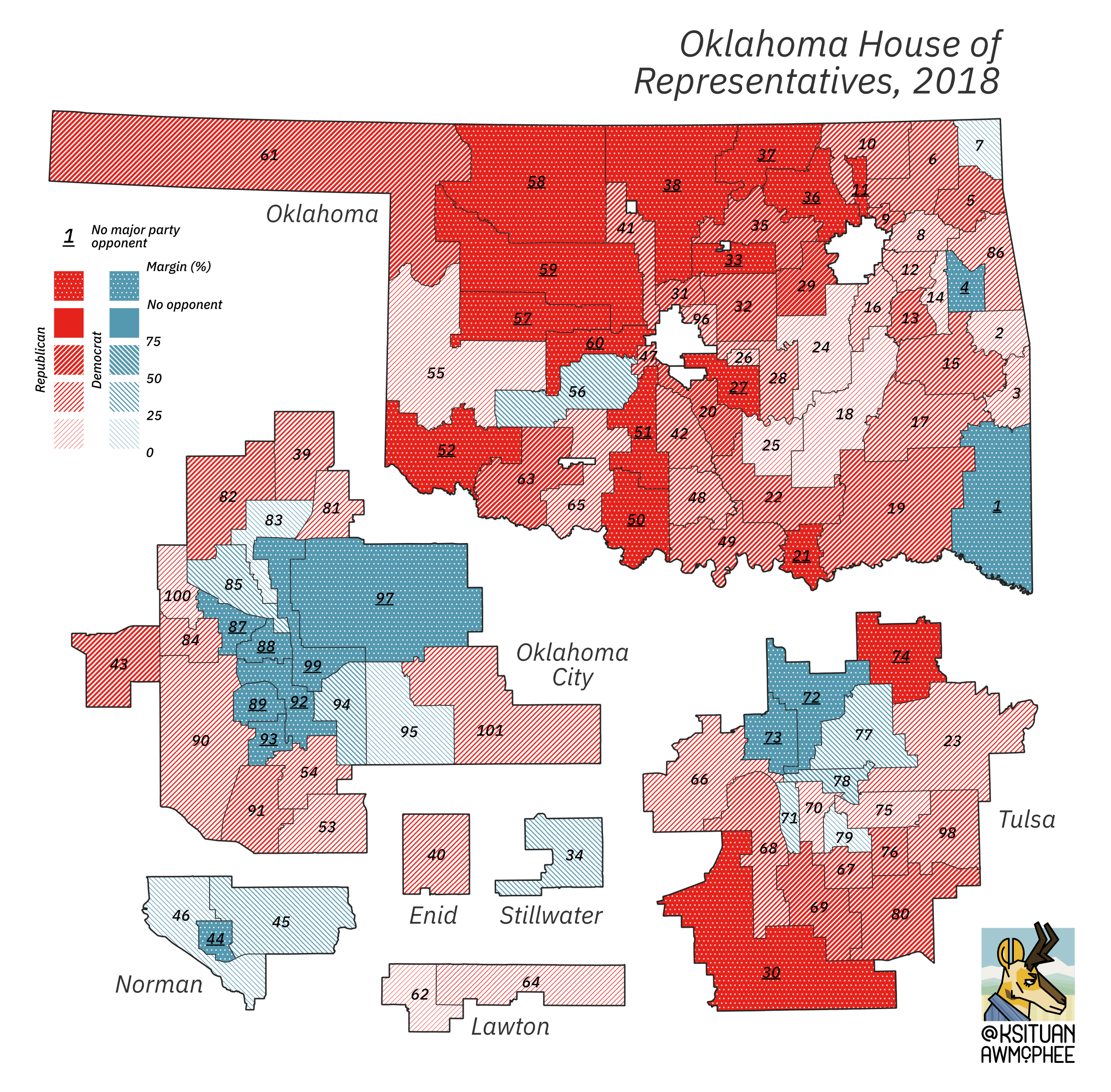
2018 Oklahoma House of Representatives elections

Half of the seats of the Oklahoma Senate and all of the seats of the Oklahoma House of Representatives were up for election in 2018. Republicans retained control of both chambers.

Oklahoma Senate
Party	Before	After	Change
Republican	42	39	▼3
Democratic	6	9	▲3
Total	48	48	

Oklahoma House of Representatives
Party	Before	After	Change
Republican	75	77	▲2
Democratic	26	24	▼2
Total	101	101	

=== Oregon ===
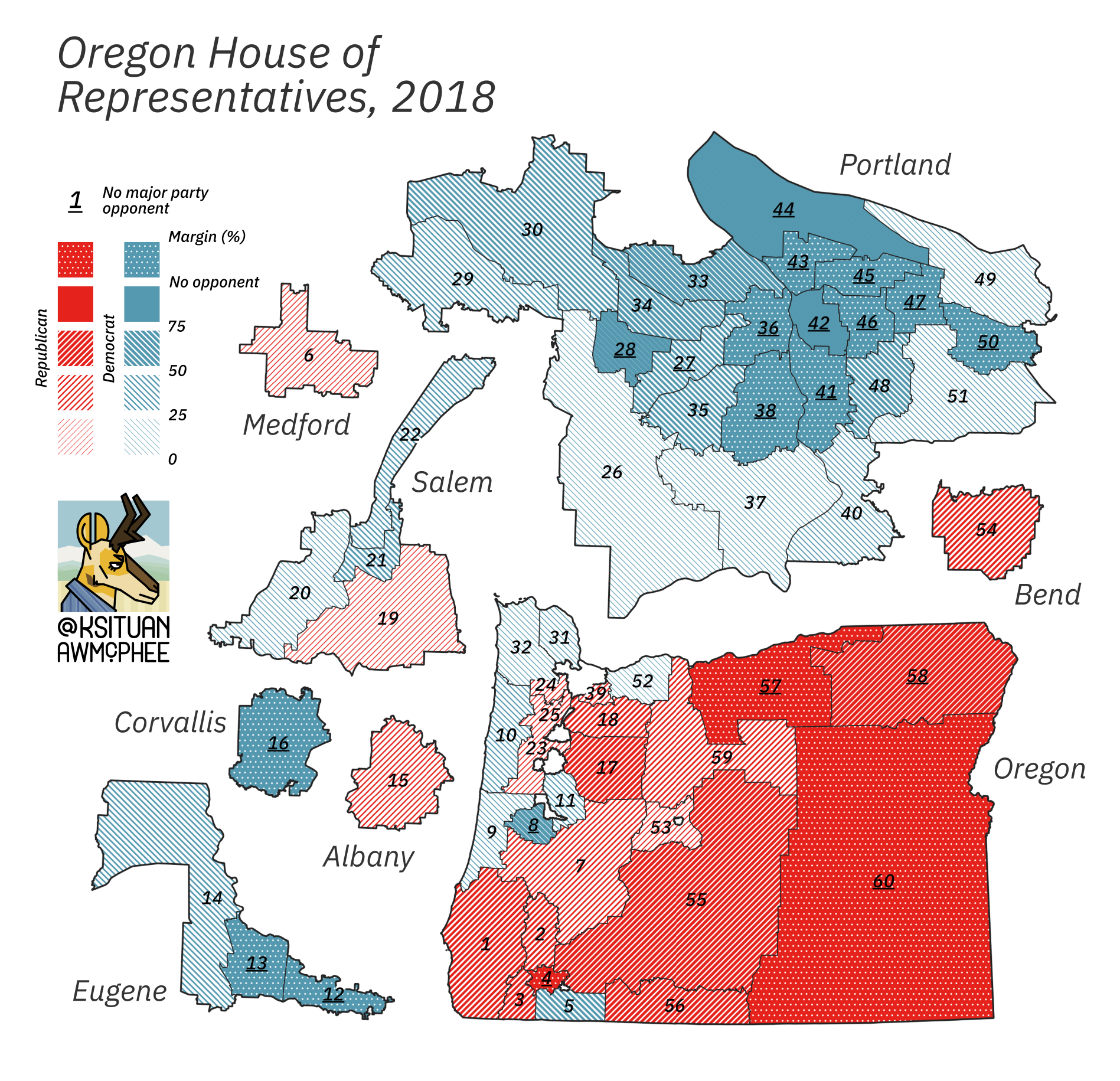
2018 Oregon House of Representatives elections

Half of the seats of the Oregon State Senate and all of the seats of the Oregon House of Representatives were up for election in 2018. Democrats retained control of both chambers.

Oregon State Senate
Party	Before	After	Change
Democratic	17	18	▲1
Republican	13	12	▼1
Total	30	30	

Oregon House of Representatives
Party	Before	After	Change
Democratic	35	38	▲3
Republican	25	22	▼3
Total	50	50	

=== Pennsylvania ===
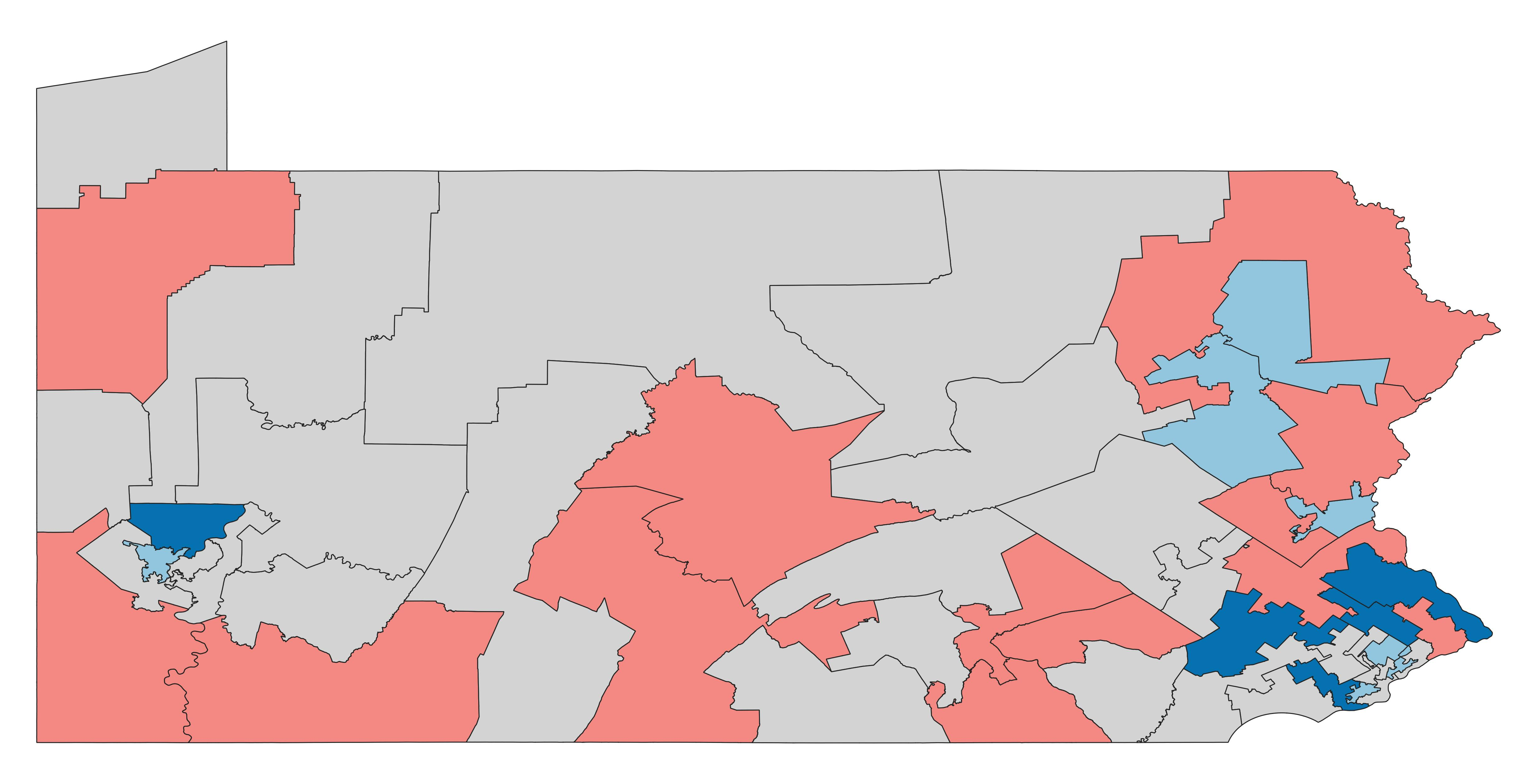
2018 Pennsylvania upper house elections

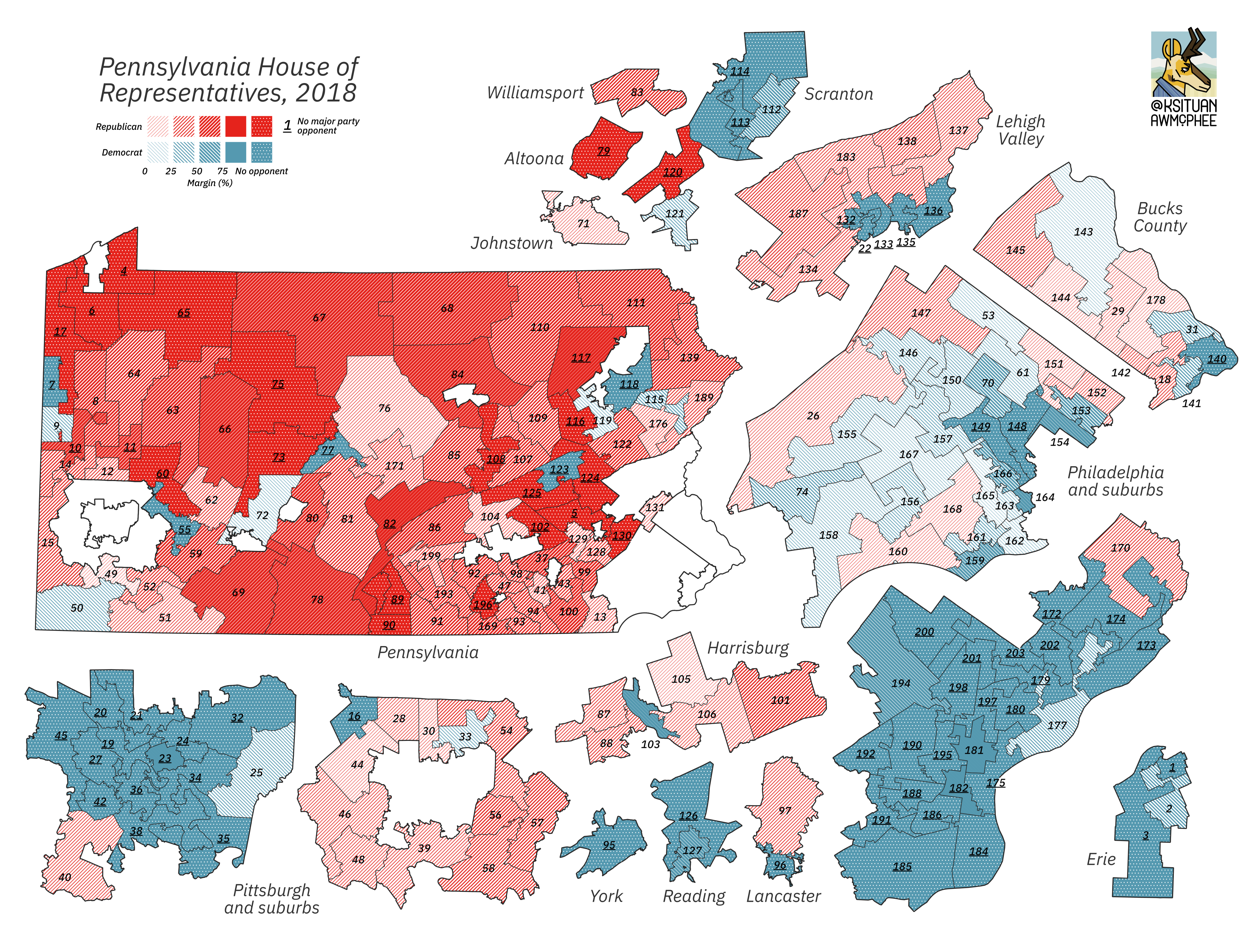
2018 Pennsylvania House of Representatives elections

Half of the seats of the Pennsylvania State Senate and all of the seats of the Pennsylvania House of Representatives were up for election in 2018. Republicans retained control of both chambers, but Democrats picked up enough seats to break the Republican legislative supermajority.

Pennsylvania State Senate
Party	Before	After	Change
Republican	34	29	▼5
Democratic	16	21	▲5
Total	50	50	

Pennsylvania House of Representatives
Party	Before	After	Change
Republican	121	110	▼11
Democratic	82	93	▲11
Total	203	203	

=== Rhode Island ===
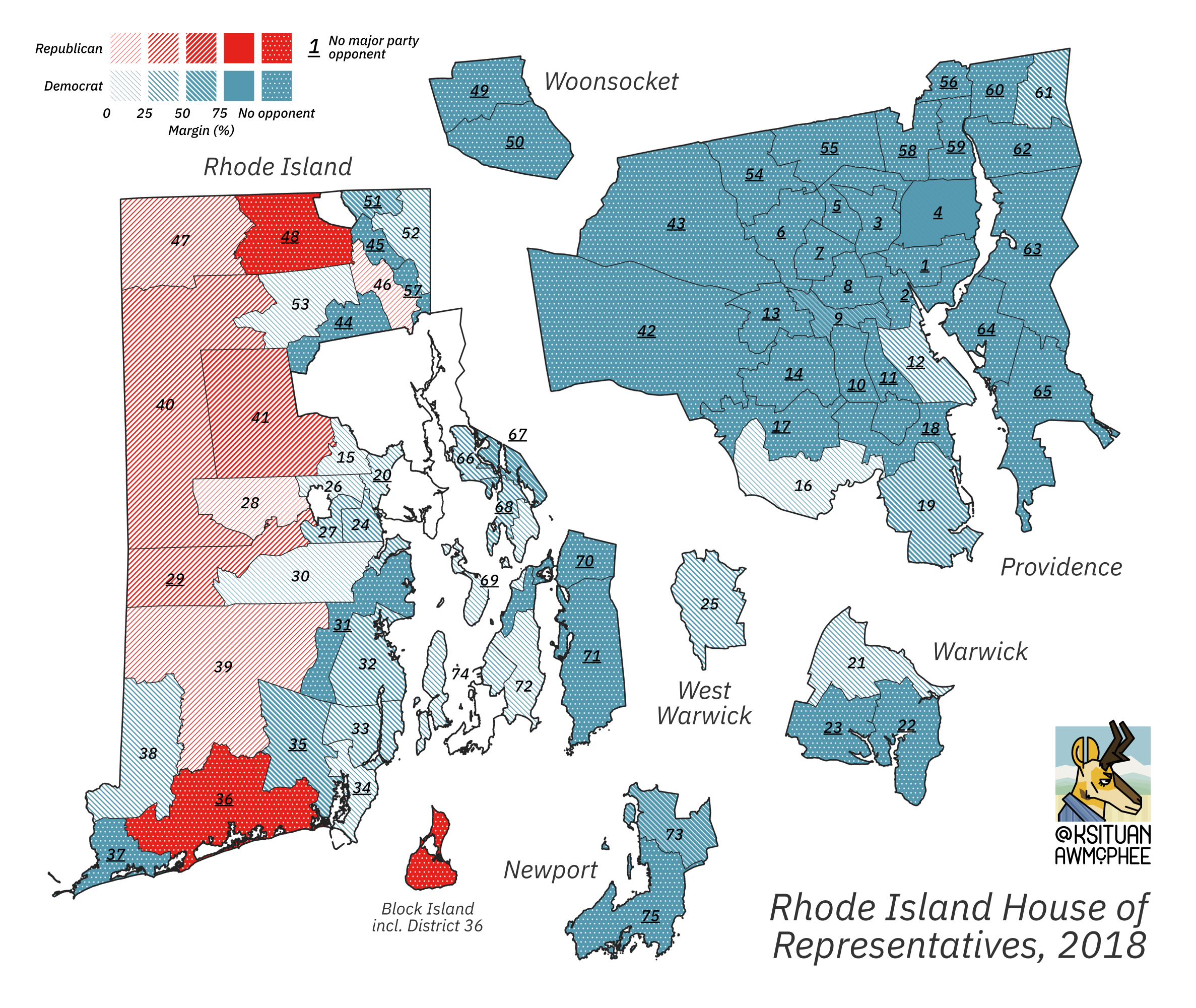
2018 Rhode Island House of Representatives elections

All of the seats of the Rhode Island Senate and the Rhode Island House of Representatives were up for election in 2018. Democrats retained control of both chambers.

Rhode Island Senate
Party	Before	After	Change
Democratic	33	33	Steady
Republican	5	5	Steady
Total	38	38	

Rhode Island House of Representatives
Party	Before	After	Change
Democratic	64	66	▲2
Republican	11	9	▼2
Total	75	75	

=== South Carolina ===
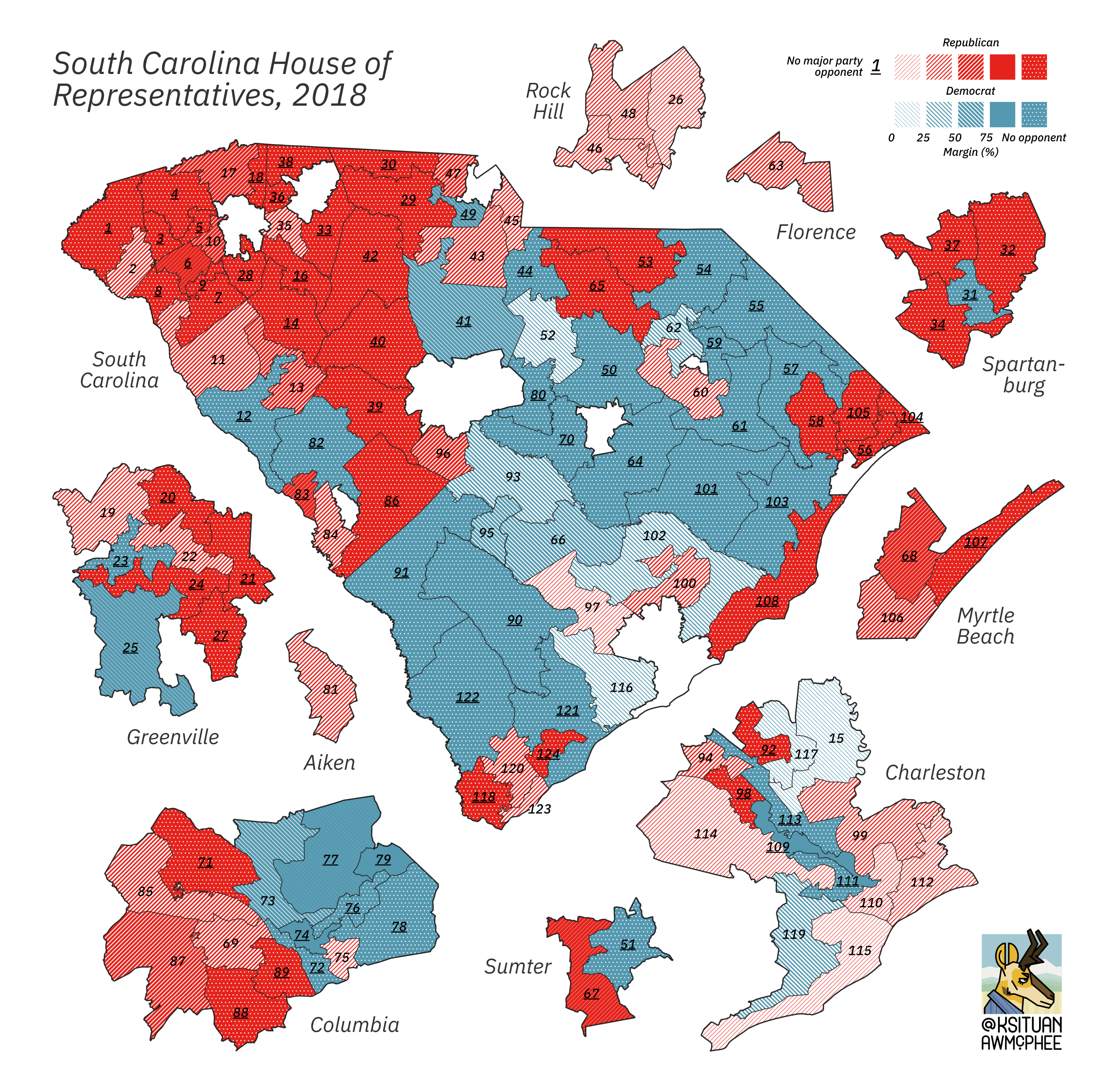
2018 South Carolina House of Representatives elections

All of the seats of the South Carolina House of Representatives were up for election in 2018; the Republican-controlled South Carolina Senate did not hold regularly scheduled elections in 2018. Republicans retained control of the House of Representatives.

South Carolina House of Representatives
Party	Before	After	Change
Republican	80	80	Steady
Democratic	44	44	Steady
Total	124	124	

=== South Dakota ===
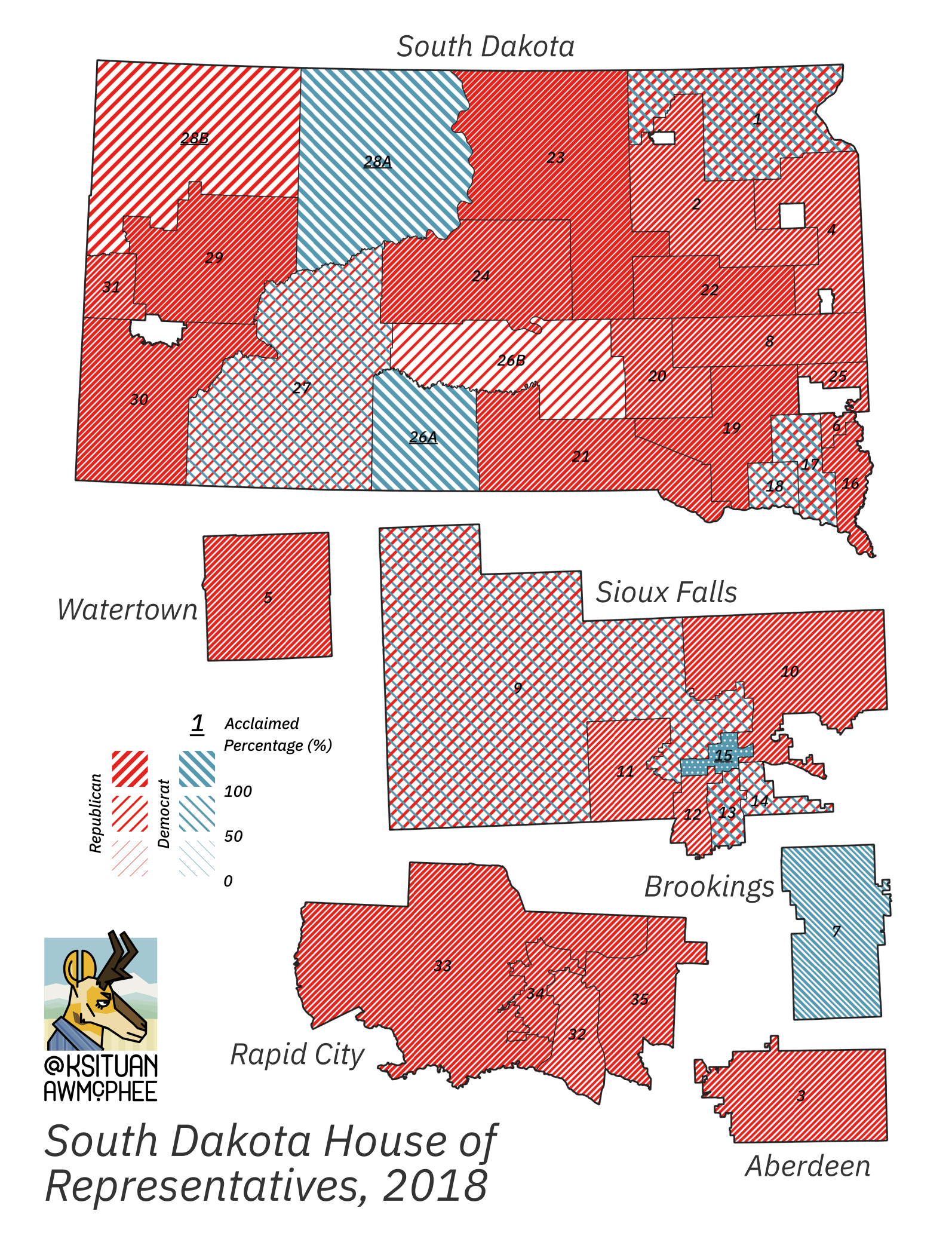
2018 South Dakota House of Representatives elections

All of the seats of the South Dakota Senate and the South Dakota House of Representatives were up for election in 2018. Republicans retained control of both chambers.

South Dakota Senate
Party	Before	After	Change
Republican	29	30	▲1
Democratic	6	5	▼1
Total	35	35	

South Dakota House of Representatives
Party	Before	After	Change
Republican	60	59	▼1
Democratic	10	11	▲1
Total	70	70	

=== Tennessee ===
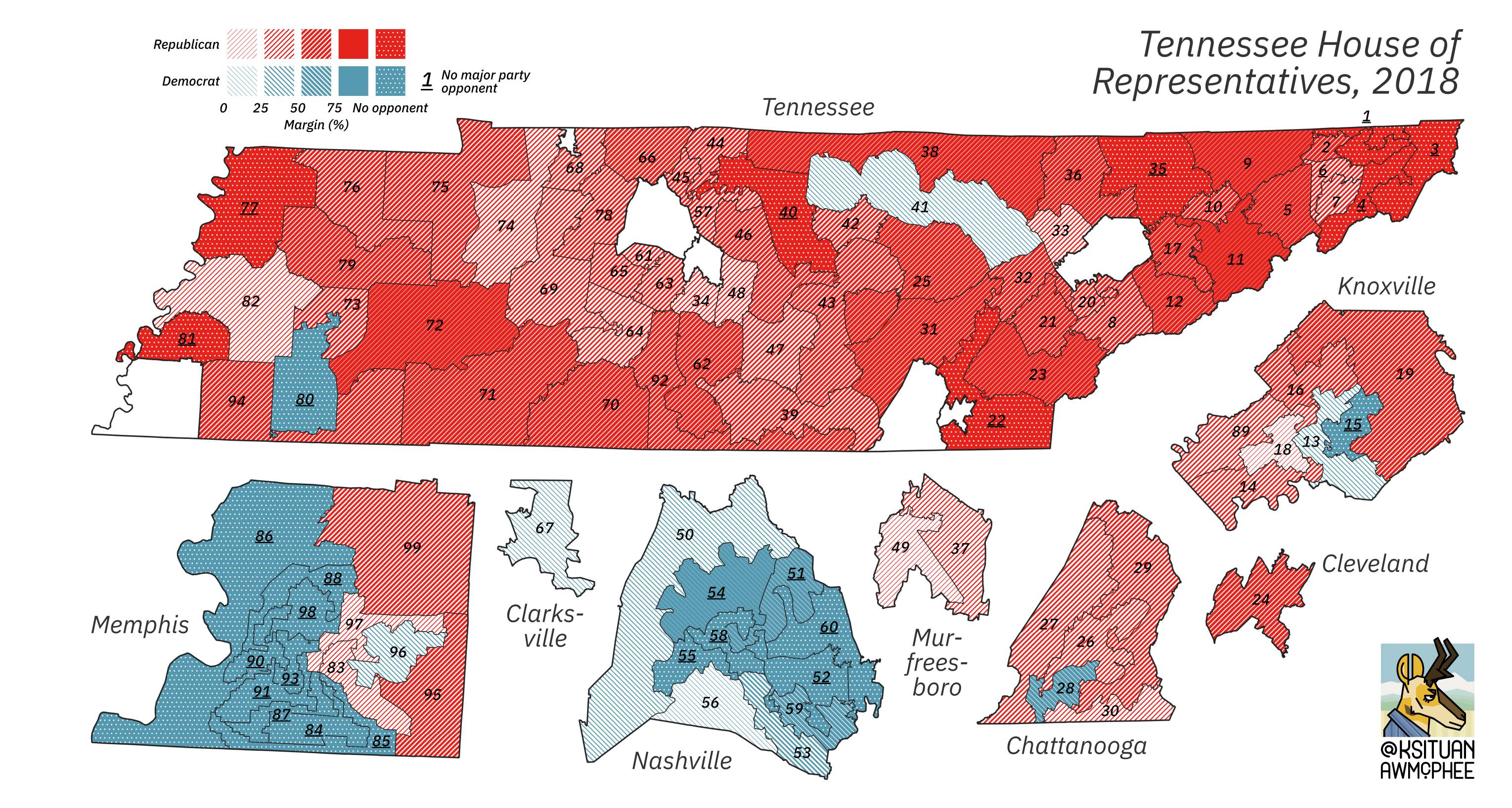
2018 Tennessee House of Representatives elections

Half of the seats of the Tennessee Senate and all of the seats of the Tennessee House of Representatives were up for election in 2018. Republicans retained control of both chambers.

Tennessee Senate
Party	Before	After	Change
Republican	28	28	Steady
Democratic	5	5	Steady
Total	33	33	

Tennessee House of Representatives
Party	Before	After	Change
Republican	74	73	▼1
Democratic	25	26	▲1
Total	99	99	

=== Texas ===
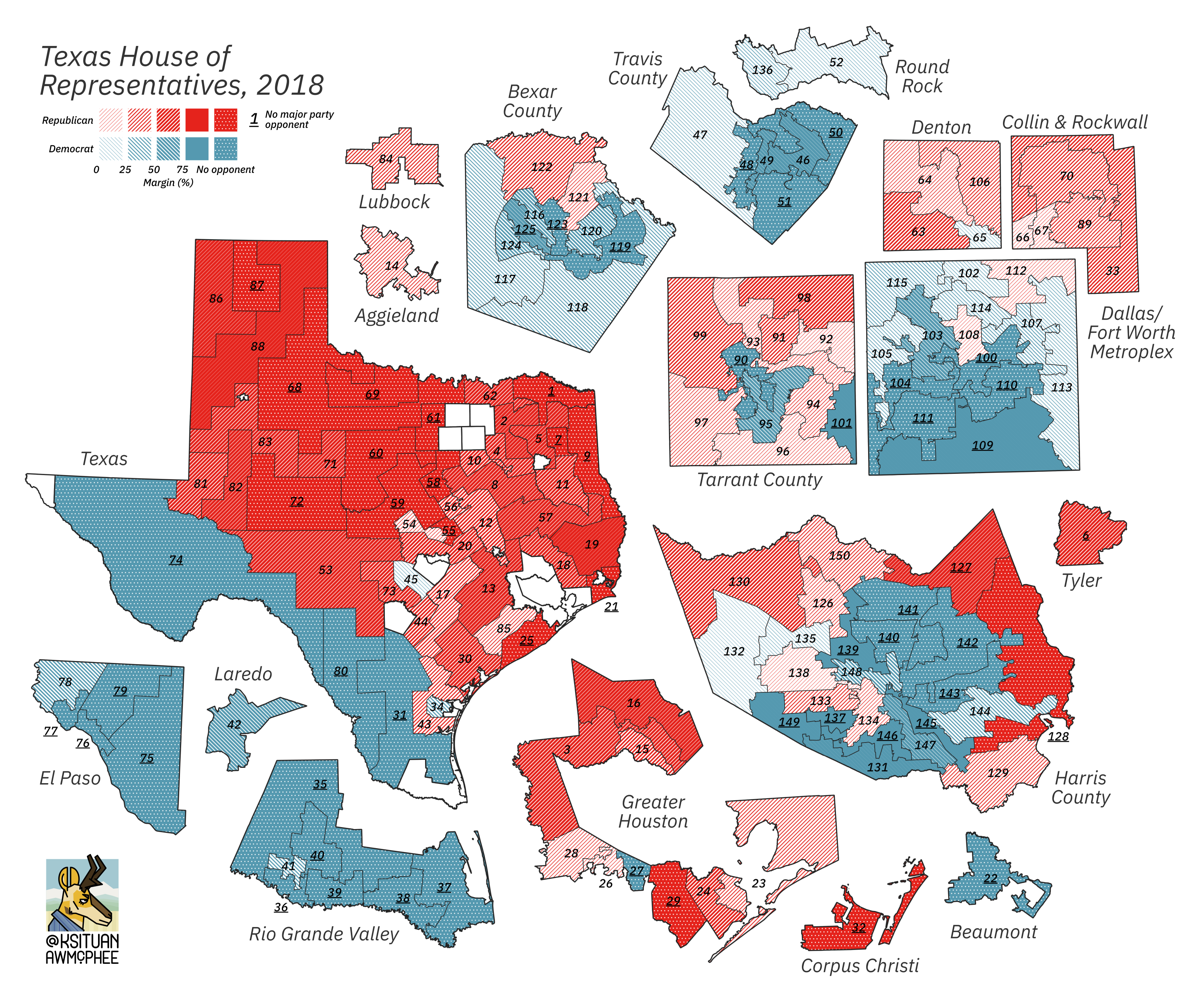
2018 Texas House of Representatives elections

Half of the seats of the Texas Senate and all of the seats of the Texas House of Representatives were up for election in 2018. Republicans retained control of both chambers.

Texas Senate
Party	Before	After	Change
Republican	21	19	▼2
Democratic	10	12	▲2
Total	31	31	

Texas House of Representatives
Party	Before	After	Change
Republican	95	83	▼12
Democratic	55	67	▲12
Total	150	150	

=== Utah ===
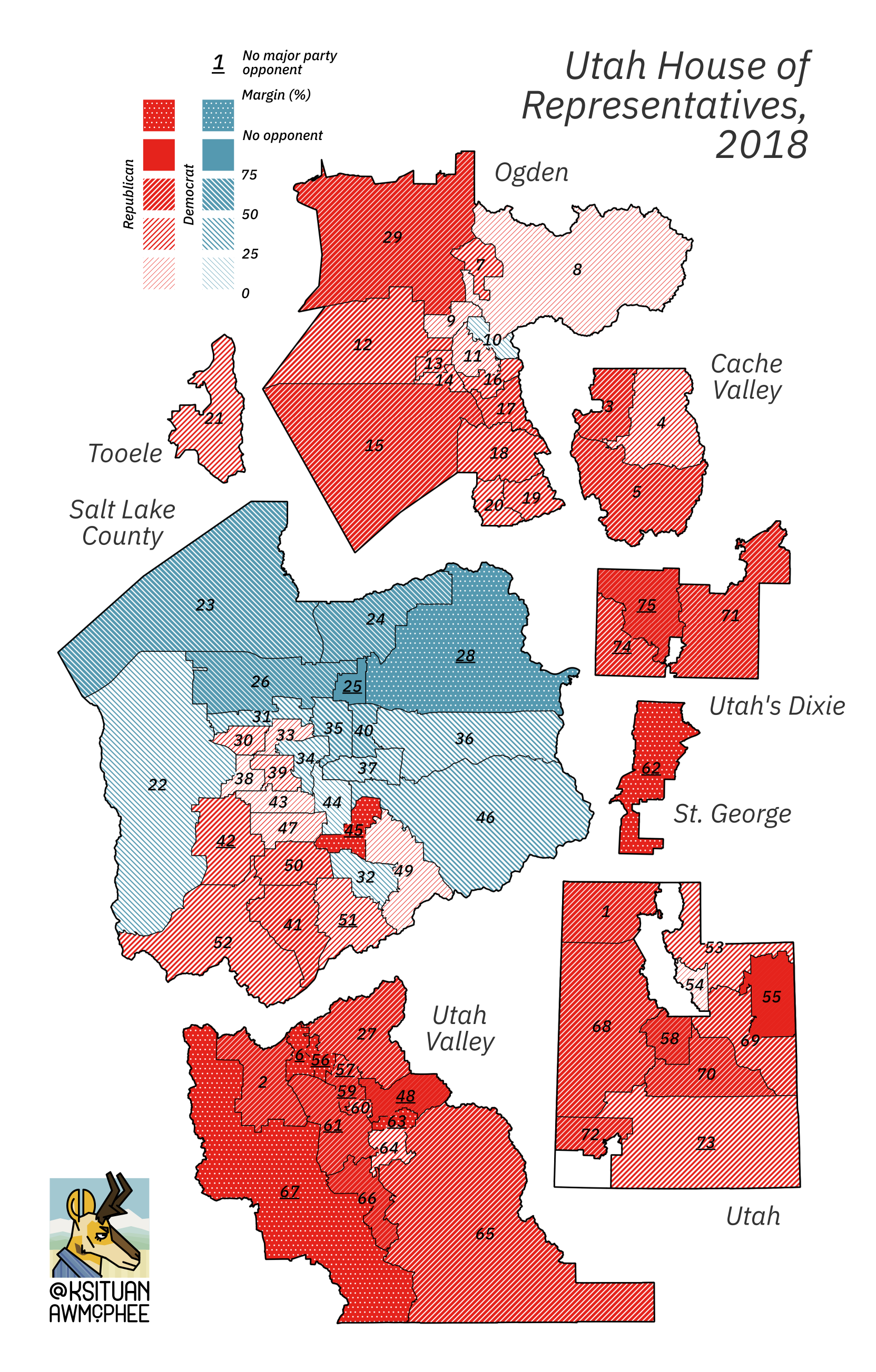
2018 Utah House of Representatives elections

Half of the seats of the Utah State Senate and all of the seats of the Utah House of Representatives were up for election in 2018. Republicans retained control of both chambers.

Utah State Senate
Party	Before	After	Change
Republican	24	23	▼1
Democratic	5	6	▲1
Total	29	29	

Utah House of Representatives
Party	Before	After	Change
Republican	62	59	▼3
Democratic	13	16	▲3
Total	75	75	

=== Vermont ===
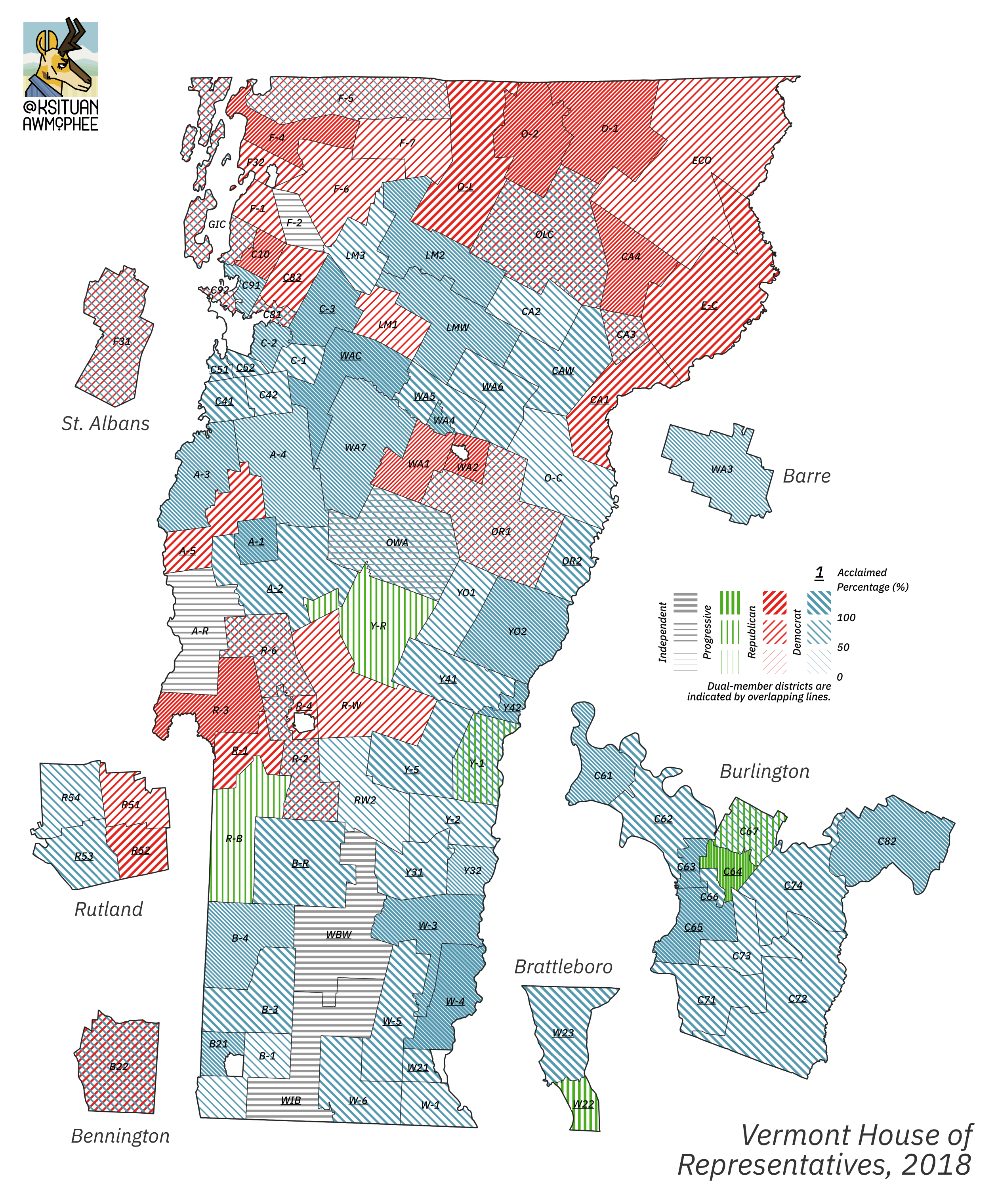
2018 Vermont House of Representatives elections

All of the seats of the Vermont Senate and the Vermont House of Representatives were up for election in 2018. Democrats retained control of both chambers.

Vermont Senate
Party	Before	After	Change
Democratic	21	22	▲1
Republican	7	6	▼1
Progressive	2	2	Steady
Total	30	30	

Vermont House of Representatives
Party	Before	After	Change
Democratic	83	95	▲12
Republican	53	43	▼10
Progressive	7	7	Steady
Independent	7	5	▼2
Total	150	150	

=== Washington ===
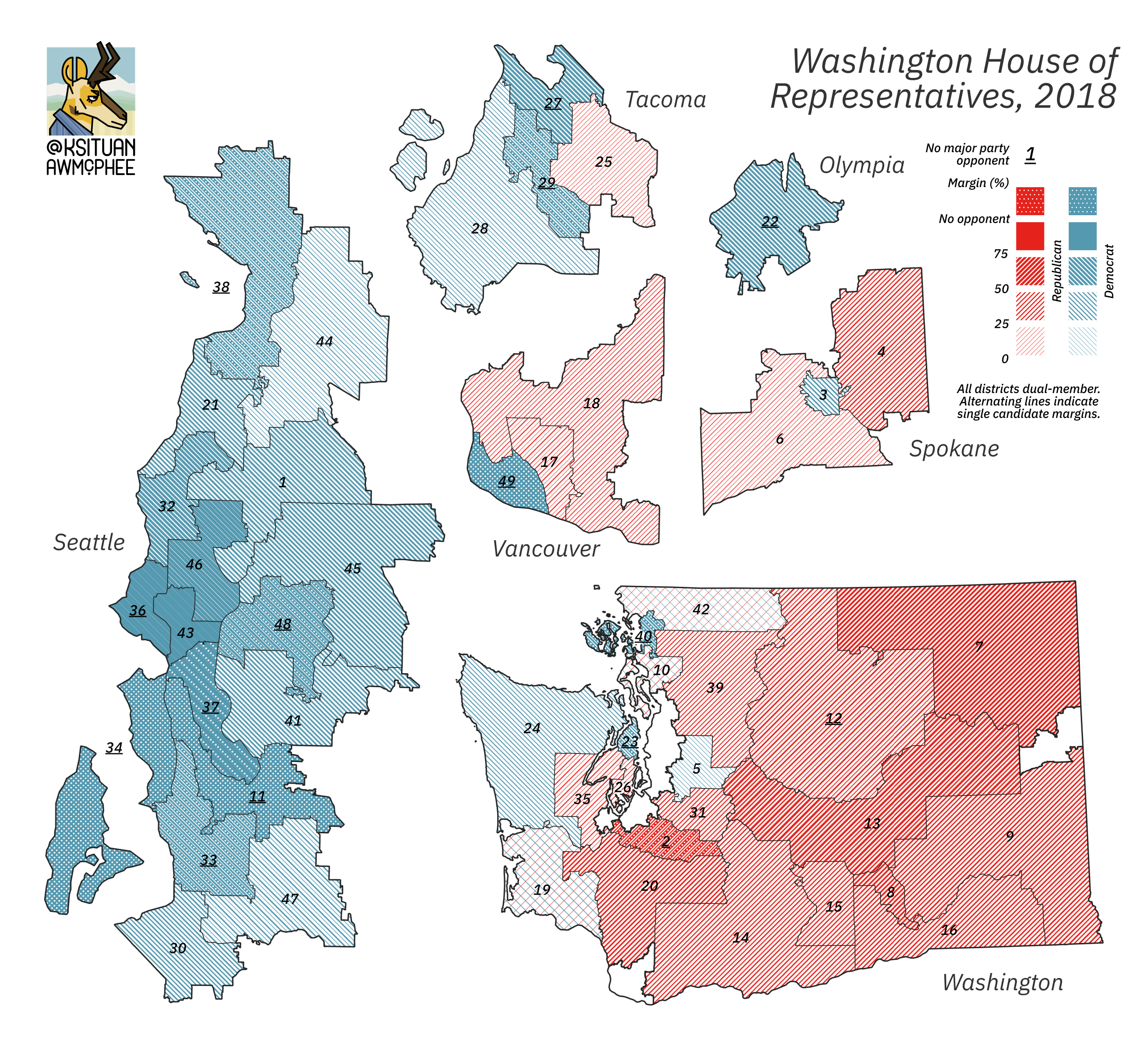
2018 Washington House of Representatives elections

Half of the seats of the Washington State Senate and all of the seats of the Washington House of Representatives were up for election in 2018. Democrats had previously flipped control of the Senate in a 2017 special election. Democrats retained control of both chambers.

Washington State Senate
Party	Before	After	Change
Democratic	25	28	▲3
Democratic	1 (Note: One Democrat caucused with the Republicans)	1	▼3
Republican	23	20	▼3
Total	49	49	

Washington House of Representatives
Party	Before	After	Change
Democratic	50	57	▲7
Republican	48	41	▼7
Total	98	98	

=== West Virginia ===
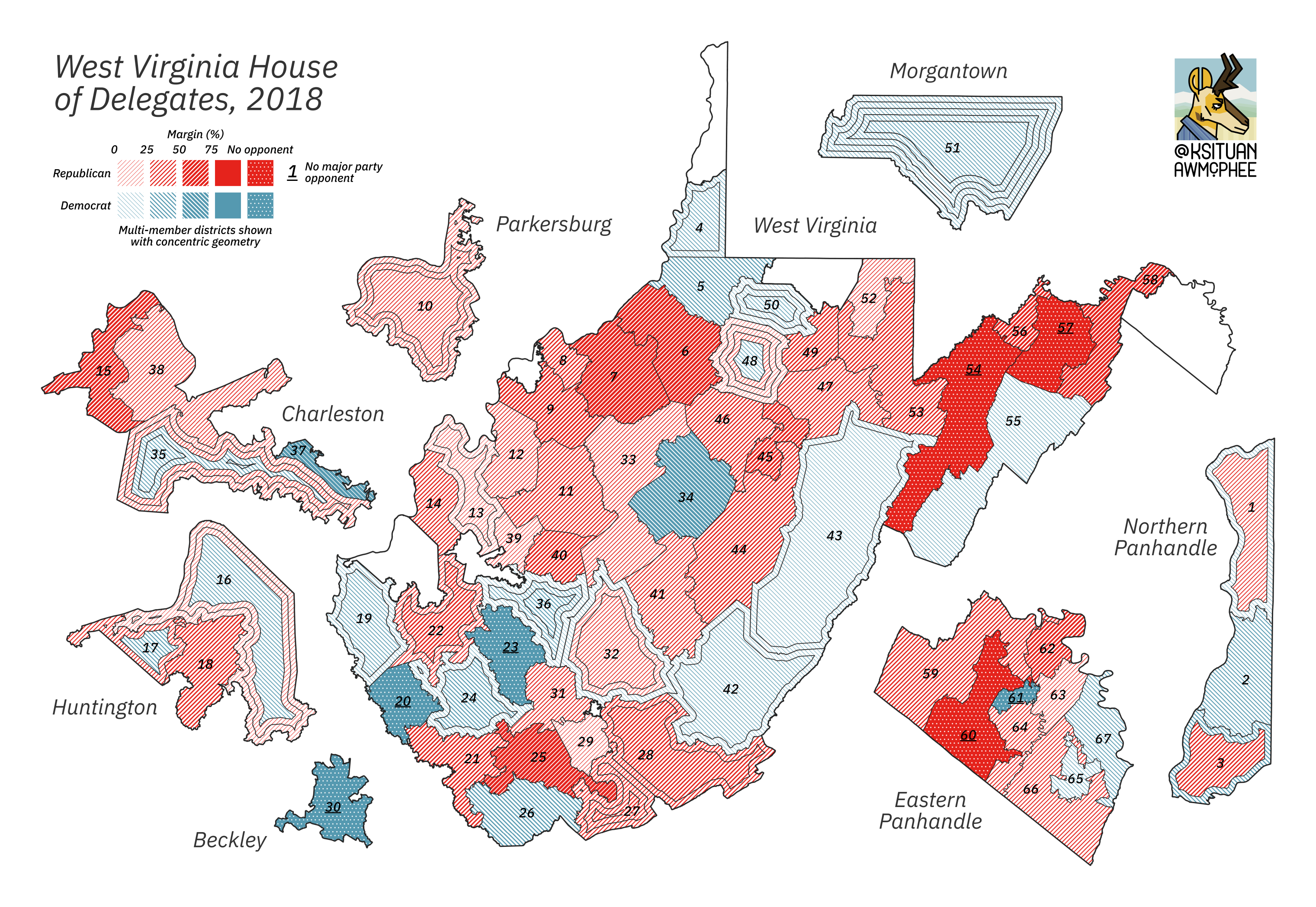
2018 West Virginia House of Delegates elections

Half of the seats of the West Virginia Senate and all of the seats of the West Virginia House of Delegates were up for election in 2018. Republicans retained control of both chambers.

West Virginia Senate
Party	Before	After	Change
Republican	22	20	▼2
Democratic	12	14	▲2
Total	34	34	

West Virginia House of Delegates
Party	Before	After	Change
Republican	64	57	▼7
Democratic	36	43	▲7
Total	100	100	

=== Wisconsin ===
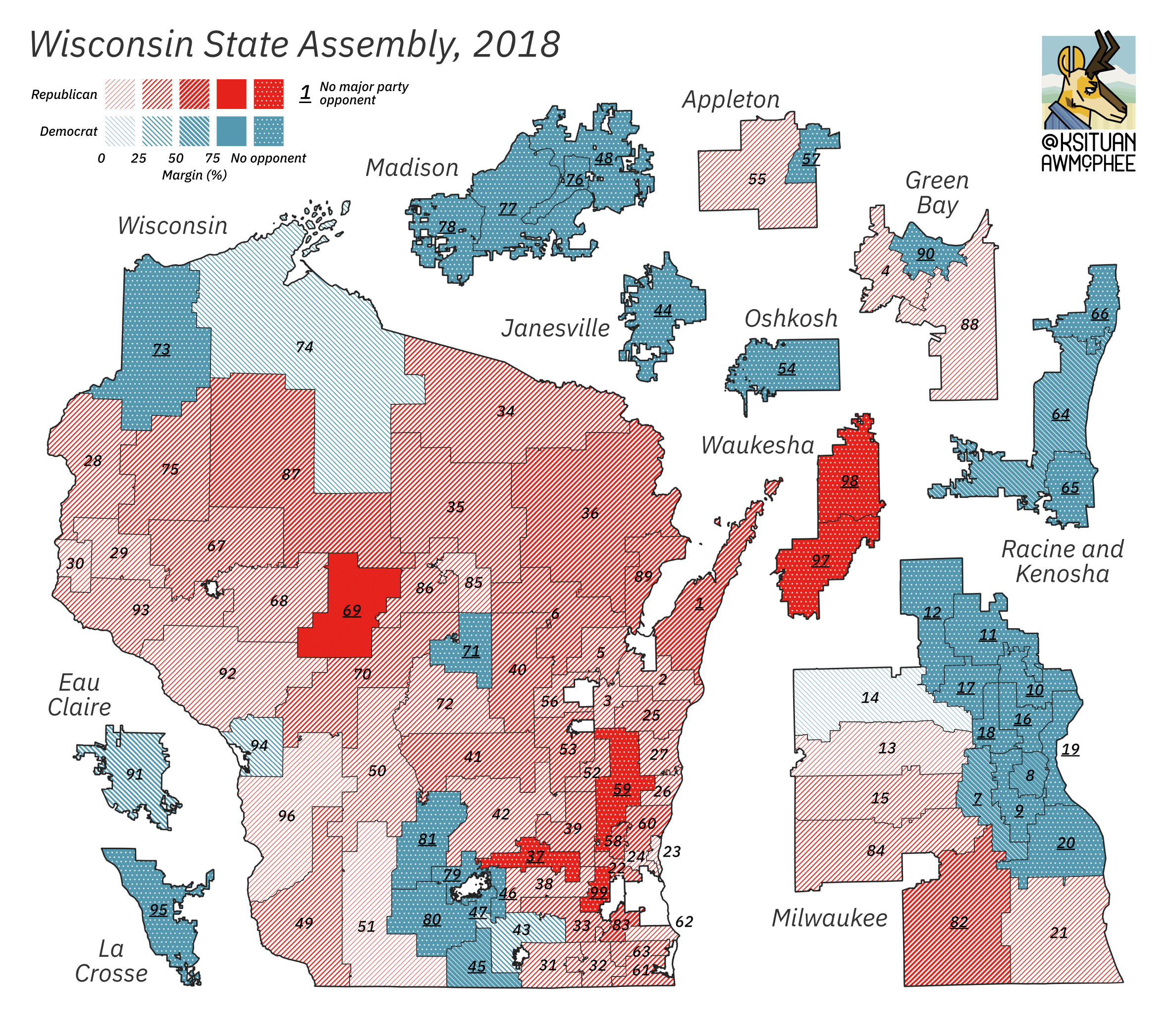
2018 Wisconsin State Assembly elections

Half of the seats of the Wisconsin State Senate and all of the seats of the Wisconsin State Assembly were up for election in 2018. Republicans retained control of both chambers.

Wisconsin Senate
Party	Before	After	Change
Republican	18	19	▲1
Democratic	15	14	▼1
Total	33	33	

Wisconsin State Assembly
Party	Before	After	Change
Republican	64	63	▼1
Democratic	35	36	▲1
Total	99	99	

=== Wyoming ===
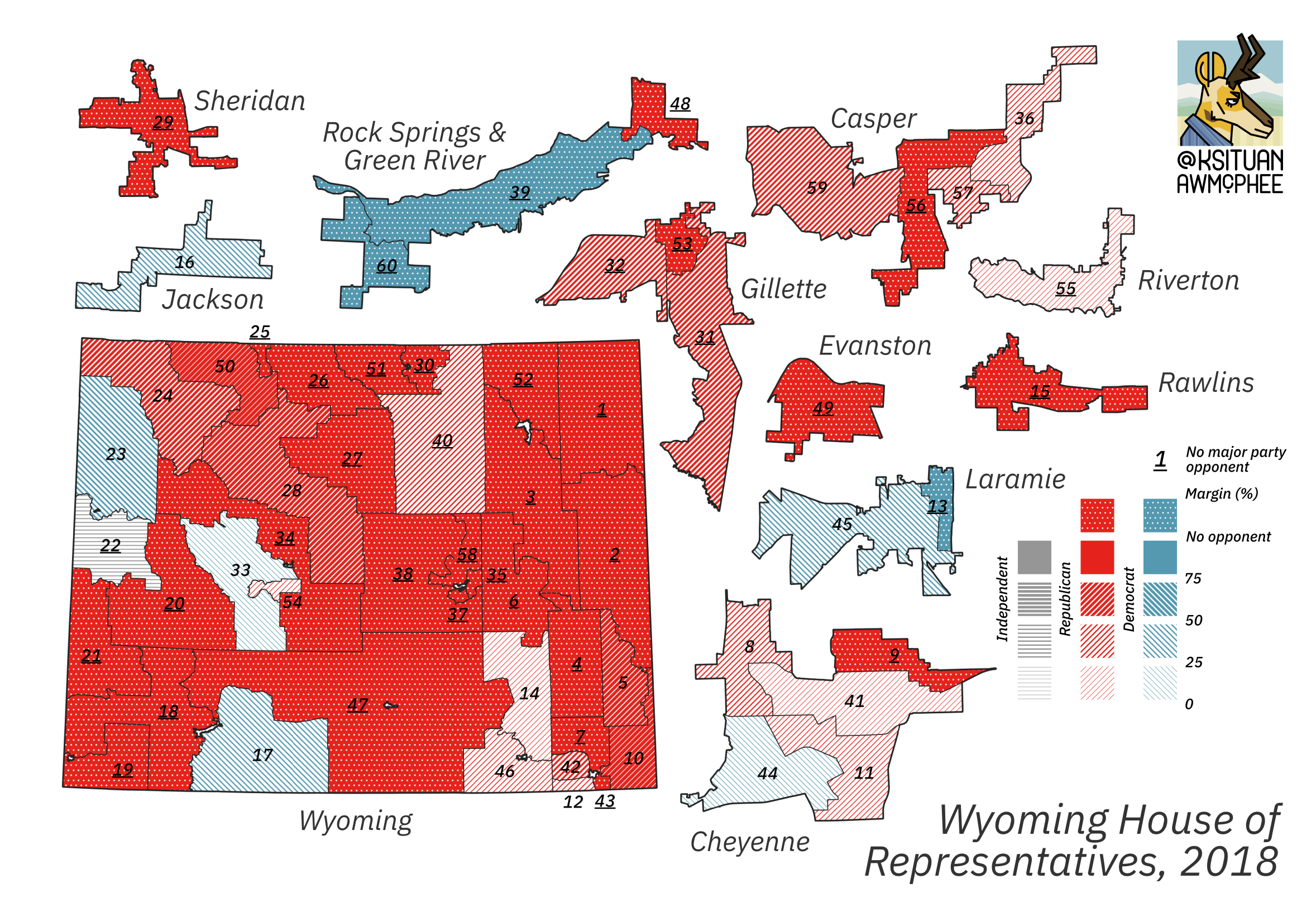
2018 Wyoming House of Representatives elections

Half of the seats of the Wyoming Senate and all of the seats of the Wyoming House of Representatives were up for election in 2018. Republicans retained control of both chambers.

Wyoming Senate
Party	Before	After	Change
Republican	27	27	Steady
Democratic	3	3	Steady
Total	30	30	

Wyoming House of Representatives
Party	Before	After	Change
Republican	51	50	▼1
Democratic	9	9	Steady
Independent	0	1	▲1
Total	60	60	

== Territorial and federal district summaries ==
=== American Samoa ===
All of the seats of the American Samoa House of Representatives were up for election. Members of the House of Representatives serve two-year terms. Gubernatorial and legislative elections are conducted on a nonpartisan basis in American Samoa.

=== Guam ===
All of the seats of the unicameral Legislature of Guam were up for election. All members of the legislature serve a two-year term. Democrats retained control of the legislature.

Guam Legislature
Party	Before	After	Change
Democratic	9	10	▲1
Republican	6	5	▼1
Total	15	15	

=== Northern Mariana Islands ===
A portion of the seats of the Northern Mariana Islands Senate, and all of the seats of the Northern Mariana Islands House of Representatives, were up for election. Members of the senate serve either four-year terms, while members of the house serve two-year terms. Republicans maintained control of both chambers.

Northern Mariana Islands Senate
Party	Before	After	Change
Republican	7	6	▼1
Independent	2	3	▲1
Democratic	0	0	Steady
Total	9	9	

Northern Mariana Islands House of Representatives
Party	Before	After	Change
Republican	15	13	▼2
Democratic	0	0	Steady
Independent	5	7	▲2
Total	20	20	

=== U.S. Virgin Islands ===
All of the seats of the unicameral Legislature of the Virgin Islands were up for election. All members of the legislature serve a two-year term. Democrats retained control of the legislature.

Virgin Islands Legislature
Party	Before	After	Change
Democratic	11	13	▲2
Independent	4	2	▼2
Total	15	15	

=== Washington, D.C. ===
Council results

The Council of the District of Columbia serves as the legislative branch of the federal district of Washington, D.C. Half of the council seats are up for election. Council members serve four-year terms. Democrats retained supermajority control of the council.

District of Columbia Council
Party	Before	After	Change
Democratic	11	11	Steady
Independent	2	2	Steady
Total	13	13	

== Special elections ==
Various states held special elections for legislative districts throughout the year.

=== Alabama ===
District		Incumbent			This race	
Chamber	No.	Representative	Party	First elected	Results	Candidates
House	21	Jim Patterson	Republican	2010	Incumbent died October 2, 2017, of heart attack. New member elected March 27, 2018. Republican hold.	▌ ✓ Rex Reynolds (Republican) 52.8%; ▌ C. Terry Jones (Democratic) 47.1%
House	4	Micky Hammon	Republican	2002	Incumbent resigned September 11, 2017. New member elected May 15, 2018. Republican hold.	▌ ✓ Parker Moore (Republican) 65.0%; Jo Ann Cummings (Democratic) 25.4%; Pete Wills (Independent) 9.5%
Senate	26	Quinton T. Ross, Jr.	Democratic	2002	Incumbent resigned October 2, 2017, to become the president of Alabama State University; New member elected May 15, 2018. Democratic hold.	▌ ✓ David Burkette (Democratic) 89.3%; ▌ D.J. Johnson(Republican) 10.4%

=== New Jersey ===
District		Incumbent			This race	
Chamber	No.	Representative	Party	First elected	Results	Candidates
Senate	38	Robert M. Gordon	Democratic	2007	Incumbent resigned April 4, 2018, to join the New Jersey Board of Public Utilities. New member elected November 6, 2018. Democratic hold.	▌ ✓ Joseph Lagana (Democratic) 60.1%; ▌ Daisy Ortiz Berger (Republican) 39.9%
Assembly	5	Arthur Barclay	Democratic	2015	Incumbent resigned June 18, 2018, following arrest for assault. New member elected November 6, 2018. Democratic hold.	▌ ✓ William Spearman (Democratic) 66.3%; ▌ Nicholas Kush (Republican) 33.7%
Assembly	15	Elizabeth Maher Muoio	Democratic	2015 (appointed)	Incumbent resigned January 15, 2018, to become State Treasurer of New Jersey. New member elected November 6, 2018. Democratic hold.	▌ ✓ Verlina Reynolds-Jackson (Democratic) 72.0%; ▌ Tracy R. Sinatra (Republican) 26.4%; ▌ Ed Forchion (Repeal Bail Reform) 1.6%
Assembly	15	Reed Gusciora	Democratic	1995	Incumbent resigned June 30, 2018, to become Mayor of Trenton. New member elected November 6, 2018. Democratic hold.	▌ ✓ Anthony Verrelli (Democratic) 71.5%; ▌ Justin Tibbetts (Republican) 25.5%; ▌ Alex Bethea (Integrity Transparency Accountability) 3.0%
Assembly	22	Jerry Green	Democratic	1991	Incumbent died April 18, 2018, from a long illness. New member elected November 6, 2018. Democratic hold.	▌ ✓ Linda S. Carter (Democratic) 69.4%; ▌ John Quattrocchi (Republican) 30.6%
Assembly	32	Vincent Prieto	Democratic	2004 (appointed)	Incumbent resigned February 26, 2018, to become President and CEO of the New Jersey Sports and Exposition Authority. New member elected November 6, 2018. Democratic hold.	▌ ✓ Pedro Mejia (Democratic) 100.0%
Assembly	34	Sheila Oliver	Democratic	2003	Incumbent resigned January 9, 2018, to become Lieutenant Governor of New Jersey. New member elected November 6, 2018. Democratic hold.	▌ ✓ Britnee Timberlake (Democratic) 81.9%; ▌ Irene DeVita (Republican) 16.6%; ▌ Clenard Howard Childress Jr. (Stop the Insanity) 1.5%
Assembly	36	Marlene Caride	Democratic	2011	Incumbent resigned January 16, 2018, to become Commissioner of the New Jersey Department of Banking and Insurance. New member elected November 6, 2018. Democratic hold.	▌ ✓ Clinton Calabrese (Democratic) 63.8%; ▌ Marc Marsi (Republican) 36.2%
Assembly	38	Joseph Lagana	Democratic	2013	Incumbent resigned April 12, 2018, to join the State Senate. New member elected November 6, 2018. Democratic hold.	▌ ✓ Lisa Swain (Democratic) 59.7%; ▌ Gail Horton (Republican) 40.3%
Assembly	38	Tim Eustace	Democratic	2011	Incumbent resigned April 13, 2018, to become Deputy Director of the North Jersey District Water Supply Commission. New member elected November 6, 2018. Democratic hold.	▌ ✓ Chris Tully (Democratic) 59.3%; ▌ Jayme Ouellette (Republican) 40.7%
