= 2008 Washington elections =

2008 Washington Statewide Executive Offices elections
- November 4, 2008

All 9 Statewide Executive Offices
	Majority party	Minority party
Party	Democratic	Republican
Last election	6	3
Seats won	7	2
Seat change	▲1	▼1
Percentage	57.12%	42.88%
Swing	▲0.30%	▲3.22%

Washington has 9 Executive seats, all elected at large. In 2008, all 9 positions were up for reelection. As of 2025, this was the last set of statewide elections in Washington in which any Republicans won by double digits.

== Offices and Candidates ==
=== Governor ===
Incumbent Democratic governor Christine Gregoire ran for re-election, defeating Republican nominee Dino Rossi. In contrast to the previous election, where Gregoire narrowly defeated Rossi by only 129 votes, Gregoire won by 6.5%.

2008 Washington gubernatorial election
Primary election
Party	Candidate	Votes	%
Democratic	Christine Gregoire	696,306	48.27
Republican	Dino Rossi	668,571	46.35
Republican	John W. Aiken, Jr.	21,564	1.49
Democratic	Christian Joubert	16,646	1.15
Independent	James White	10,884	0.75
Green	Duff Badgley	9,702	0.67
Nonpartisan	Christopher Tudor	5,600	0.39
Reform	Will Baker	5,201	0.36
Republican	Javier O. Lopez	4,981	0.35
Nonpartisan	Mohammad Hasan Said	3,002	0.21
Total votes		1,442,457	100.00
General election
Democratic	Christine Gregoire (incumbent)	1,598,738	53.24
Republican	Dino Rossi	1,404,124	46.76
Total votes		3,002,862	100.00
Democratic hold			

=== Lt. Governor ===
Brad Owen, who has held this position since 1996, ran for re-election to a fourth term. He defeated Republican nominee Marcia McCraw in a landslide, winning over 60% of the vote.

2008 Washington lieutenant gubernatorial election
Primary election
Party	Candidate	Votes	%
Democratic	Brad Owen (incumbent)	706,641	52.08
Republican	Marcia McCraw	347,551	25.62
Republican	Jim Wiest	193,752	14.28
Democratic	Randel Bell	59,890	4.41
Constitution	Arlene A. Peck	48,887	3.60
Total votes		1,356,721	100.00
General election
Democratic	Brad Owen (incumbent)	1,718,033	60.80
Republican	Marcia McCraw	1,107,634	39.20
Total votes		2,825,667	100.00
Democratic hold			

=== Secretary of State ===
Sam Reed, who held this position since 2001, was re-elected to a third and final term, defeating Democrat Jason Osgood.

2012 Washington Secretary of State election
Primary election
Party	Candidate	Votes	%
Republican	Sam Reed	816,171	59.40
Democratic	Jason Osgood	446,222	32.48
Constitution	Marilyn Montgomery	88,728	6.46
Independent	Mark Greene	22,800	1.66
Total votes		1,330,036	100.00
General election
Republican	Sam Reed (incumbent)	1,644,587	58.33
Democratic	Jason Osgood	1,175,086	41.67
Invalid or blank votes			
Total votes		2,819,673	100.00
Turnout			
Republican hold			

=== State Treasurer ===
Incumbent State Treasurer Mike Murphy (D) retired. Democratic State Representative James McIntire and Republican Allan Martin advanced to the general election, where McIntire narrowly won the open seat.

2008 Washington State Treasurer election
Primary election
Party	Candidate	Votes	%
Republican	Allan Martin	613,595	45.33
Democratic	James McIntire	533,443	39.41
Democratic	ChangMook Sohn	206,457	15.25
Total votes		1,353,495	100.00
General election
Democratic	Jim McIntire	1,420,022	51.08
Republican	Allen Martin	1,360,063	48.92
Invalid or blank votes			
Total votes		2,780,085	100.00
Turnout			
Democratic hold			

=== State Auditor ===
Incumbent State Auditor Brian Sonntag, who had held this position since 1993, ran for re-election to a fifth term. Sonntag defeated Republican Richard "Dick" McEntee with over 63% of the vote.

2008 Washington State Auditor election
Primary election
Party	Candidate	Votes	%
Democratic	Brian Sonntag (incumbent)	812,352	59.48
Republican	J. Richard (Dick) McEntee	459,327	33.63
Constitution	Glenn Freeman	94,148	6.89
Total votes		1,365,827	100.00
General election
Democratic	Brian Sonntag (incumbent)	1,770,977	63.54
Republican	J. Richard (Dick) McEntee	1,016,396	36.46
Invalid or blank votes			
Total votes		2,787,373	100.00
Turnout			
Democratic hold			

=== Attorney general ===
Incumbent Republican Attorney General Rob McKenna ran for re-election, facing Pierce County Executive John Ladenburg, a Democrat, in the general election. McKenna won re-election in a landslide, winning by almost 20 points and carrying all but two counties.

2008 Washington Attorney General election
Primary election
Party	Candidate	Votes	%
Republican	Rob McKenna (incumbent)	783,240	56.98
Democratic	John Ladenburg	591,254	43.02
Total votes		1,374,494	100.00
General election
Republican	Rob McKenna (incumbent)	1,689,764	59.46
Democratic	John Ladenburg	1,152,174	40.54
Invalid or blank votes			
Total votes		2,841,938	100.00
Turnout			
Republican hold			

=== Commissioner of Public Lands ===
Incumbent Doug Sutherland (R), who had first been elected in 2000, ran for re-election against rancher Peter J. Goldmark in a highly contested race. Despite polls before the election showing Sutherland leading, on election day Goldmark narrowly defeated Sutherland.

2008 Washington Commissioner of Public Lands election
Primary election
Party	Candidate	Votes	%
Republican	Doug Sutherland (incumbent)	691,145	51.13
Democratic	Peter J. Goldmark	660,714	48.87
Total votes		1,351,859	100.00
General election
Democratic	Peter J. Goldmark	1,416,904	50.55
Republican	Doug Sutherland (incumbent)	1,385,903	49.45
Invalid or blank votes			
Total votes		2,802,807	100.00
Turnout			
Democratic gain from Republican			

=== Superintendent of Public Instruction ===
Incumbent Democratic Superintendent of Public Instruction Terry Bergeson ran for re-election to a fourth term. She was defeated by Randy Dorn. The superintendent is the only nonpartisan statewide election.

2008 Washington Superintendent of Public Instruction election
Primary election
Party	Candidate	Votes	%
Nonpartisan	Terry Bergeson (incumbent)	477,130	39.31
Nonpartisan	Randy Dorn	414,313	34.13
Nonpartisan	Don Hansler	108,984	8.98
Nonpartisan	John P. Blair	90,508	7.46
Nonpartisan	Enid Duncan	78,983	6.51
Nonpartisan	David Blomstrom	43,984	3.62
Total votes		1,213,902	100.00
General election
Nonpartisan	Randy Dorn	1,333,290	52.38
Nonpartisan	Terry Bergeson (incumbent)	1,211,909	47.62
Total votes		2,545,199	100.00
Democratic hold			

=== Insurance Commissioner ===
2008 Washington Insurance Commissioner election
Primary election
Party	Candidate	Votes	%
Democratic	Mike Kreidler (incumbent)	723,732	53.86
Republican	John Adams	484,992	36.09
Nonpartisan	Curtis Fackler	135,113	10.05
Total votes		1,343,837	100.00
General election
Democratic	Mike Kreidler (incumbent)	1,679,696	61.38
Republican	John Adams	1,056,693	38.62
Total votes		2,736,389	100.00
Democratic hold			
