= 2024 Washington Superintendent of Public Instruction election =

- November 5, 2024
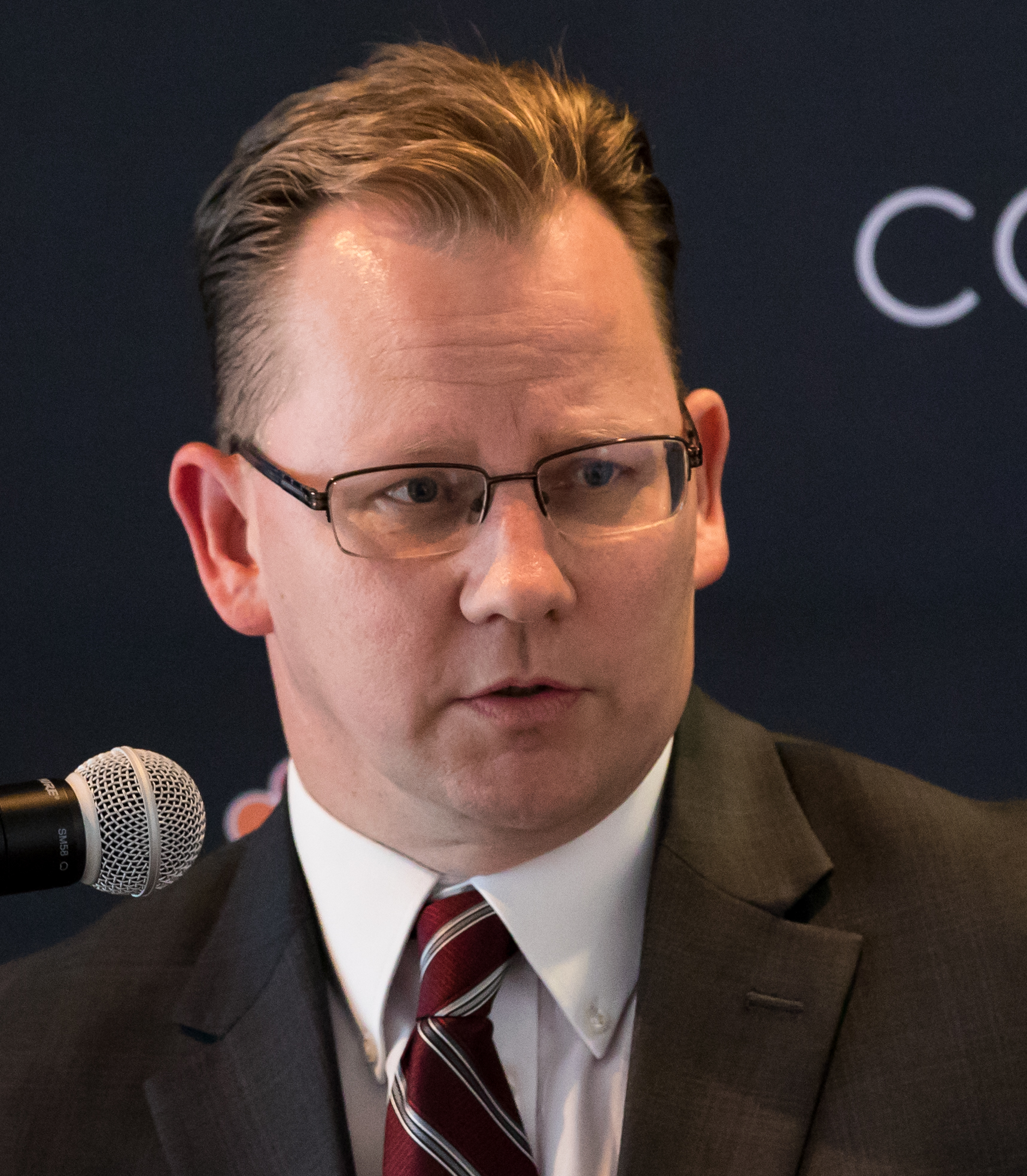

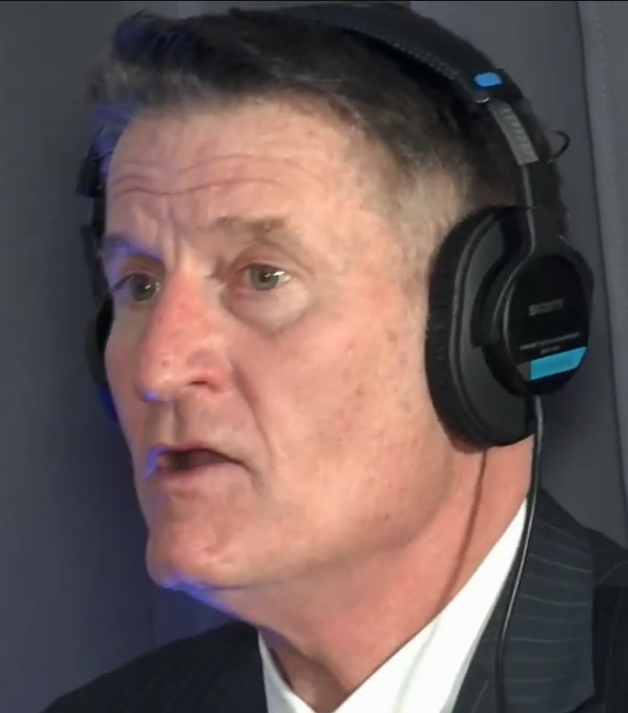
Nominee	Chris Reykdal	David Olson
Party	Independent	Independent
Popular vote	1,746,848	1,543,550
Percentage	52.77%	46.63%
- Reykdal: 40–50% 50–60% 60–70% 70–80% 80–90% 90–100% Olson: 40–50% 50–60% 60–70% 70–80% 80–90% 90–100% Tie: 40–50% 50% No votes
Superintendent of Public Instruction before election
Chris Reykdal
Independent
Elected Superintendent of Public Instruction
Chris Reykdal
Independent

The 2024 Washington Superintendent of Public Instruction election was held on November 5, 2024, to elect the superintendent of public instruction of Washington, concurrently with the 2024 U.S. presidential election, as well as elections to the U.S. Senate and various state and local elections, including for U.S. House and governor of Washington. Incumbent Superintendent of Public Instruction Chris Reykdal was re-elected to a third term, defeating challenger David Olson with 53% of the vote. While the race was officially non-partisan, Reykdal identified as a Democrat, while Olson identified as a Republican.

== Background ==
Incumbent Superintendent of Public Instruction Chris Reykdal, first elected in 2016 with 51% of the vote and re-elected in 2020 with 55% of the vote, ran for re-election to a third term in office.

== Primary election ==
Washington is one of two states that holds a top-two primary, meaning all candidates are listed on the same ballot regardless of party affiliation, and the top two advance to the general election.

=== Candidates ===
==== Advanced to general ====
- Chris Reykdal, incumbent state superintendent, former state representative, and former world history teacher
- David Olson, president of the Peninsula School District board

==== Eliminated in primary ====
- John Blair, perennial candidate and former high school teacher
- Reid Saaris, founder of nonprofit Equal Opportunity Schools and former teacher

==== Withdrew ====
- Brad Klippert, former state representative
- Chad Magendanz, former state representative and computer science teacher

=== Endorsements ===
Chris Reykdal

Labor unions

- AFSCME Council 28
- Service Employees International Union Locals 925, 6 and 775
- Washington State Labor Council
- International Association of Machinists District 751
- International Brotherhood of Electrical Workers Local 73
- International Union of Painters and Allied Trades District Council 5
- Washington Education Association

Organizations

- Washington Conservation Voters
- Stand for Children
- 3 branches of the Indivisible movement (Note: Tacoma, Olympia & Snohomish County)
- Planned Parenthood Action Fund
David Olson

Political parties

- Washington State Republican Party
Reid Saaris

Newspapers

- The Seattle Times

=== Polling ===
Poll source	Date(s) administered	Sample size (Note: Key: A – all adults RV – registered voters LV – likely voters V – unclear)	Margin of error	Chris Reykdal	John Blair	David Olson	Reid Saaris	Undecided
Public Policy Polling (D) (Note: Poll sponsored by the Northwest Progressive Institute)	July 24–25, 2024	581 (LV)	± 4.0%	14%	4%	7%	2%	74%

=== Forum ===
2024 Washington Superintendent of Public Instruction primary election candidate forum
No.	Date	Host	Moderator	Link	Nonpartisan	Nonpartisan	Nonpartisan	Nonpartisan	Nonpartisan
Key: P Participant A Absent N Not invited I Invited W Withdrawn									
Key: P Participant A Absent N Not invited I Invited W Withdrawn					Chris Reykdal	John Blair	Chad Magendanz	David Olson	Reid Saaris
1	May 20, 2024	League of Women Voters of Washington	Renee Radcliff Sinclair	TVW	N	N	P	P	P

=== Results ===
County results Reykdal: 30–40%; 40–50%; Olson: 30–40%; 40–50%; 50–60%

Congressional district results Reykdal: 30–40%; 40–50%; 50–60%; Olson: 30–40%; 40–50%

Blanket primary election results
Party	Candidate	Votes	%
Nonpartisan	Chris Reykdal (incumbent)	702,227	39.30
Nonpartisan	David Olson	557,822	31.22
Nonpartisan	Reid Saaris	427,788	23.94
Nonpartisan	John Blair	91,410	5.12
Write-in		7,404	0.41
Total votes		1,786,651	100.00

== General election ==
=== Post-primary endorsements ===
Chris Reykdal

Newspapers

- The News Tribune
- The Seattle Times

=== Polling ===
Poll source	Date(s) administered	Sample size	Margin of error	Chris Reykdal	David Olson	Undecided
Public Policy Polling (D)	October 16–17, 2024	571 (LV)	± 4.1%	21%	18%	61%

=== Debates ===
2024 Washington Superintendent of Public Instruction general election debates
No.	Date	Host	Moderator	Link	Nonpartisan	Nonpartisan
Key: P Participant A Absent N Not invited I Invited W Withdrawn						
Key: P Participant A Absent N Not invited I Invited W Withdrawn					Chris Reykdal	David Olson
1	Sep. 18, 2024	Association of Washington Business	Renee Radcliff Sinclair	TVW	P	P
2	Sep. 26, 2024	Washington State Debate Coalition	Kellyanna Brooking; Venice Buhain; John Hopperstad; Sami West	TVW	P	P
3	Oct. 5, 2024	League of Women Voters of Washington	Ann Dornfeld	TVW	P	P

=== Results ===
2024 Washington Superintendent of Public Instruction election
Party	Candidate	Votes	%	±%
Nonpartisan	Chris Reykdal (incumbent)	1,746,848	52.77	–1.80
Nonpartisan	David Olson	1,543,550	46.63	+1.71
Write-in		19,932	0.60	+0.10
Total votes		3,310,330	100.00	N/A
Democratic hold				

==== By county ====
County	Chris Reykdal Democratic		David Olson Republican		Write-in Various		Margin		Total
County	#	%	#	%	#	%	#	%	Total
Adams	1,542	32.97%	3,072	65.68%	63	1.35%	-1,530	-32.71%	4,677
Asotin	3,816	40.19%	5,613	59.12%	66	0.70%	-1,797	-18.93%	9,495
Benton	36,399	41.51%	50,826	57.96%	467	0.53%	-14,427	-16.45%	87,692
Chelan	15,618	44.87%	19,007	54.61%	180	0.52%	-3,389	-9.74%	34,805
Clallam	19,434	48.78%	20,253	50.84%	152	0.38%	-819	-2.06%	39,839
Clark	106,328	47.40%	116,201	51.80%	1,815	0.81%	-9,873	-4.40%	224,344
Columbia	668	32.60%	1,361	66.42%	20	0.98%	-693	-33.82%	2,049
Cowlitz	19,150	38.36%	30,441	60.98%	330	0.66%	-11,291	-22.62%	49,921
Douglas	7,049	39.56%	10,661	59.84%	107	0.60%	-3,612	-20.27%	17,817
Ferry	1,283	37.48%	2,127	62.14%	13	0.38%	-844	-24.66%	3,423
Franklin	10,348	38.23%	16,607	61.35%	114	0.42%	-6,259	-23.12%	27,069
Garfield	402	35.92%	715	63.90%	2	0.18%	-313	-27.97%	1,119
Grant	10,150	32.43%	21,006	67.12%	142	0.45%	-10,856	-34.69%	31,298
Grays Harbor	13,678	43.77%	17,369	55.59%	200	0.64%	-3,691	-11.81%	31,247
Island	22,821	52.46%	20,378	46.85%	299	0.69%	2,443	5.62%	43,498
Jefferson	13,419	64.07%	7,430	35.48%	95	0.45%	5,989	28.60%	20,944
King	625,058	65.69%	321,418	33.78%	5,099	0.54%	303,640	31.91%	951,575
Kitsap	66,824	51.15%	63,106	48.30%	719	0.55%	3,718	2.85%	130,649
Kittitas	9,059	42.18%	12,252	57.05%	164	0.76%	-3,193	-14.87%	21,475
Klickitat	4,457	40.46%	6,488	58.89%	72	0.65%	-2,031	-18.44%	11,017
Lewis	13,524	35.65%	24,190	63.77%	220	0.58%	-10,666	-28.12%	37,934
Lincoln	1,978	32.43%	4,081	66.90%	41	0.67%	-2,103	-34.48%	6,100
Mason	12,875	42.43%	17,204	56.70%	263	0.87%	-4,329	-14.27%	30,342
Okanogan	7,992	44.80%	9,742	54.60%	107	0.60%	-1,750	-9.81%	17,841
Pacific	5,122	44.56%	6,295	54.77%	77	0.67%	-1,173	-10.21%	11,494
Pend Oreille	2,387	33.39%	4,703	65.79%	58	0.81%	-2,316	-32.40%	7,148
Pierce	180,464	47.54%	196,911	51.87%	2,223	0.59%	-16,447	-4.33%	379,598
San Juan	6,911	66.28%	3,445	33.04%	71	0.68%	3,466	33.24%	10,427
Skagit	27,562	47.86%	29,739	51.64%	283	0.49%	-2,177	-3.78%	57,584
Skamania	2,384	40.01%	3,523	59.12%	52	0.87%	-1,139	-19.11%	5,959
Snohomish	181,910	51.75%	167,722	47.71%	1,889	0.54%	14,188	4.04%	351,521
Spokane	111,729	46.27%	128,086	53.04%	1,665	0.69%	-16,357	-6.77%	241,480
Stevens	7,222	29.52%	17,089	69.86%	150	0.61%	-9,867	-40.34%	24,461
Thurston	80,037	55.33%	63,566	43.95%	1,041	0.72%	16,471	11.39%	144,644
Wahkiakum	1,056	41.79%	1,456	57.62%	15	0.59%	-400	-15.83%	2,527
Walla Walla	11,678	46.21%	13,493	53.40%	98	0.39%	-1,815	-7.18%	25,269
Whatcom	64,300	55.16%	51,807	44.45%	455	0.39%	12,493	10.72%	116,562
Whitman	8,716	51.54%	8,088	47.82%	108	0.64%	628	3.71%	16,912
Yakima	31,498	40.09%	46,079	58.64%	997	1.27%	-14,581	-18.56%	78,574
Totals	1,746,848	52.77%	1,543,550	46.63%	19,932	0.60%	203,298	6.14%	3,310,330

Counties that flipped from Democratic to Republican

- Asotin (largest city: Clarkston)
- Chelan (largest city: Wenatchee)
- Clallam (largest city: Port Angeles)
- Garfield (largest city: Pomeroy)
- Grays Harbor (largest city: Aberdeen)
- Mason (largest city: Shelton)
- Pacific (largest city: Raymond)
- Skagit (largest city: Mount Vernon)
- Skamania (largest city: Carson)
- Wahkiakum (largest city: Puget Island)

==== By congressional district ====
Reykdal won six of ten congressional districts, with the remaining four going to Olson, including two that elected Democrats.

District	Reykdal	Olson	Representative
1st	55%	44%	Suzan DelBene
2nd	54%	45%	Rick Larsen
3rd	44%	55%	Marie Gluesenkamp Perez
4th	40%	59%	Dan Newhouse
5th	44%	55%	Cathy McMorris Rodgers (118th Congress)
5th	44%	55%	Michael Baumgartner (119th Congress)
6th	51%	48%	Derek Kilmer (118th Congress)
6th	51%	48%	Emily Randall (119th Congress)
7th	77%	22%	Pramila Jayapal
8th	47%	52%	Kim Schrier
9th	60%	39%	Adam Smith
10th	52%	48%	Marilyn Strickland

== Notes ==
Partisan clients
