= 2012 Washington Superintendent of Public Instruction election =

- November 6, 2012
Nominee	Randy Dorn
Party	Independent
Popular vote	2,164,163
Percentage	100.00%
- Dorn: 100%
Superintendent of Public Instruction before election
Randy Dorn
Independent
Elected Superintendent of Public Instruction
Randy Dorn
Independent

The 2012 Washington Superintendent of Public Instruction election was held on November 6, 2012, to elect the superintendent of public instruction of Washington, concurrently with the 2012 U.S. presidential election, as well as elections to the U.S. Senate and various state and local elections, including for U.S. House and governor of Washington. Incumbent Superintendent of Public Instruction Randy Dorn was re-elected to a second term unopposed.

== Background ==
Incumbent Superintendent of Public Instruction Randy Dorn, first elected in 2008 with 52% of the vote, ran for re-election to a second term in office.

== Primary election ==
Washington is one of two states that holds a top-two primary, meaning all candidates are listed on the same ballot regardless of party affiliation, and the top two advance to the general election.

=== Candidates ===
==== Advanced to general ====
- Randy Dorn, incumbent state superintendent (2009–2017)

==== Eliminated in primary ====
- James Bauckman, educator
- John P. Blair, perennial candidate and former high school teacher
- Donald Hansler, retired educator
- Ron Higgins, substitute teacher and retired engineer

=== Endorsements ===
Randy Dorn

Newspapers

- The Seattle Times

=== Results ===
Due to Dorn receiving a majority of the vote in the primary election he was the only candidate to advance to the general election, in which he ran unopposed.

County results Dorn: 30–40%; 40–50%; 50–60%; 60–70%

Congressional district results Dorn: 40–50%; 50–60%; 60–70%; 70–80%

Blanket primary election results
Party	Candidate	Votes	%
Nonpartisan	Randy Dorn (incumbent)	634,314	56.22
Nonpartisan	Ron Higgins	172,331	15.27
Nonpartisan	James Bauckman	149,370	13.24
Nonpartisan	Donald Hansler	104,360	9.25
Nonpartisan	John P. Blair	67,898	6.02
Total votes		1,128,273	100.00

== General election ==
=== Results ===
2012 Washington Superintendent of Public Instruction election
Party	Candidate	Votes	%
Nonpartisan	Randy Dorn (incumbent)	2,164,163	100.00
Total votes		2,164,163	100.00
Democratic hold			
