= 2016 Washington Superintendent of Public Instruction election =

- November 8, 2016
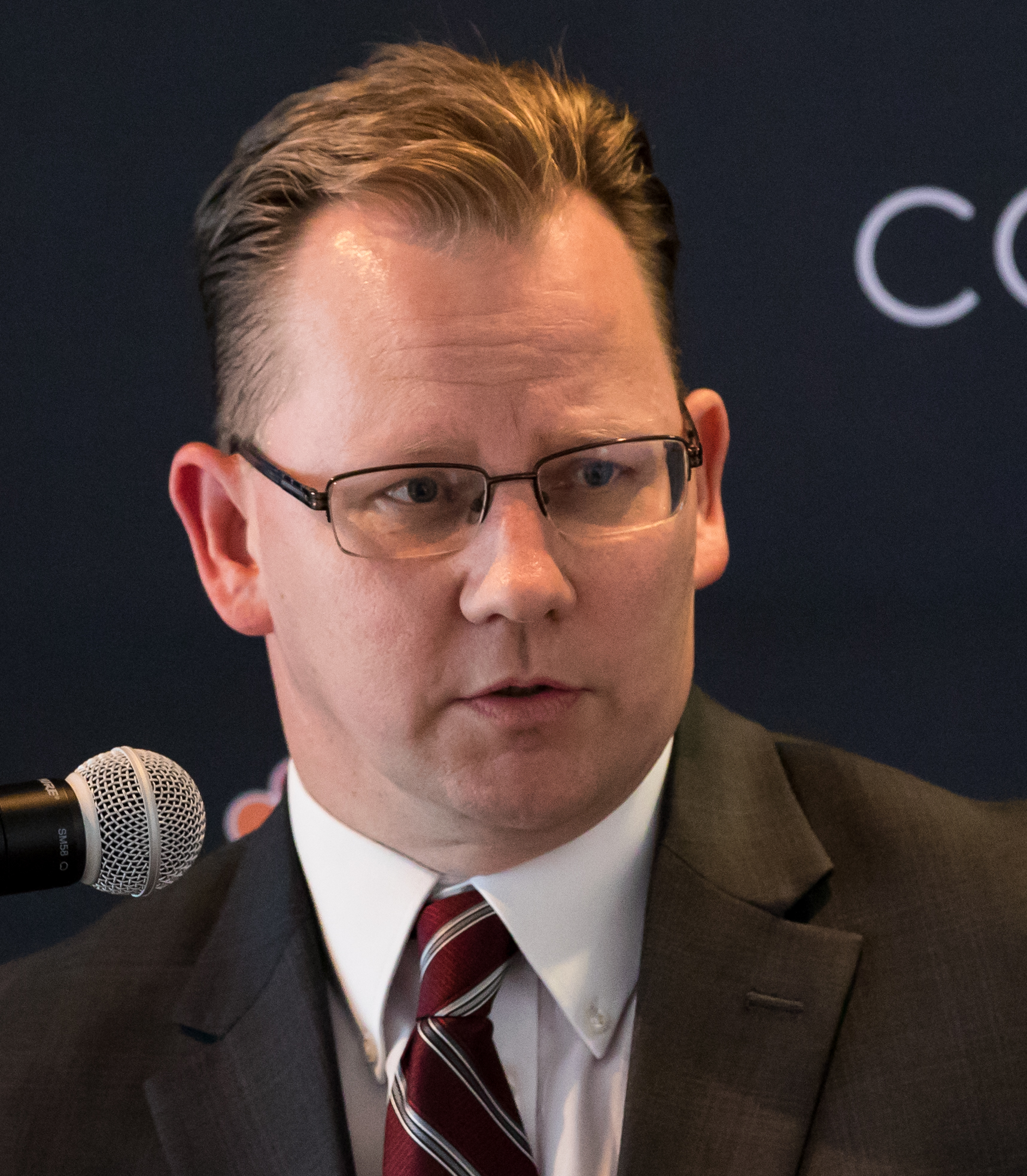

Nominee	Chris Reykdal	Erin Jones
Party	Independent	Independent
Popular vote	1,337,547	1,309,896
Percentage	50.52%	49.48%
- Reykdal: 50–60% Jones: 50–60%
Superintendent of Public Instruction before election
Randy Dorn
Independent
Elected Superintendent of Public Instruction
Chris Reykdal
Independent

The 2016 Washington Superintendent of Public Instruction election was held on November 8, 2016, to elect the superintendent of public instruction of Washington, concurrently with the 2016 U.S. presidential election, as well as elections to the U.S. Senate and various state and local elections, including for U.S. House and governor of Washington. Incumbent Superintendent of Public Instruction Randy Dorn retired. State Representative Chris Reykdal defeated educator Erin Jones to succeed Dorn. While the race was officially non-partisan, both Reykdal and Jones identified as Democrats.

== Background ==
Incumbent Superintendent of Public Instruction Randy Dorn, first elected in 2008 with 52% of the vote and re-elected in 2012 unopposed, retired.

== Primary election ==
Washington is one of two states that holds a top-two primary, meaning all candidates are listed on the same ballot regardless of party affiliation, and the top two advance to the general election.

=== Candidates ===
==== Advanced to general ====
- Erin Jones, educator
- Chris Reykdal, state representative and former world history teacher

==== Eliminated in primary ====
- John Patterson Blair, perennial candidate and former high school teacher
- Robin Fleming, educator
- Ron Higgins, substitute teacher and retired engineer
- KumRoon Maksirisombat, educator
- Grazyna Prouty
- Al Runte
- David Spring, educator

==== Declined ====
- Randy Dorn, incumbent state superintendent (2009–2017)

=== Endorsements ===
Erin Jones

Newspapers

- The Seattle Times

=== Results ===
County results Jones: 20–30%; 30–40%; 40–50%; Reykdal: 20–30%; 40–50%; Higgins: 20–30%; 30–40%; Fleming: 20–30%

Congressional district results Jones: 30–40%; 50–60%; Reykdal: 20–30%; 30–40%; Higgins: 20–30%; 30–40%

Blanket primary election results
Party	Candidate	Votes	%
Nonpartisan	Erin Jones	295,330	25.76
Nonpartisan	Chris Reykdal	240,194	20.95
Nonpartisan	Ron Higgins	190,886	16.65
Nonpartisan	Robin Fleming	154,991	13.52
Nonpartisan	David Spring	97,702	8.52
Nonpartisan	John Patterson Blair	64,064	5.59
Nonpartisan	KumRoon Maksirisombat	43,491	3.79
Nonpartisan	Al Runte	37,386	3.26
Nonpartisan	Grazyna Prouty	22,265	1.94
Total votes		1,146,309	100.00

== General election ==
=== Polling ===
Poll source	Date(s) administered	Sample size	Margin of error	Chris Reykdal	Erin Jones	Undecided
Elway Poll	October 20–22, 2016	502 (RV)	± 4.5%	17%	18%	65%
Elway Poll	August 9–13, 2016	500 (RV)	± 4.5%	16%	16%	68%

=== Results ===
2016 Washington Superintendent of Public Instruction election
Party	Candidate	Votes	%
Nonpartisan	Chris Reykdal	1,337,547	50.52
Nonpartisan	Erin Jones	1,309,896	49.48
Total votes		2,647,443	100.00
Democratic hold			

==== By county ====
County results
County	Chris Reykdal Democratic		Erin Jones Democratic		Margin		Total votes
County	#	%	#	%	#	%	Total votes
Adams	1,917	48.67%	2,022	51.33%	-105	-2.67%	3,939
Asotin	3,867	48.69%	4,075	51.31%	-208	-2.62%	7,942
Benton	36,390	53.75%	31,308	46.25%	5,082	7.51%	67,698
Chelan	13,848	52.37%	12,594	47.63%	1,254	4.74%	26,442
Clallam	16,182	51.54%	15,213	48.46%	969	3.09%	31,395
Clark	79,782	49.52%	81,315	50.48%	-1,533	-0.95%	161,097
Columbia	885	50.28%	875	49.72%	10	0.57%	1,760
Cowlitz	18,964	51.02%	18,209	48.98%	755	2.03%	37,173
Douglas	6,468	51.51%	6,090	48.49%	378	3.01%	12,558
Ferry	1,507	53.46%	1,312	46.54%	195	6.92%	2,819
Franklin	10,122	50.06%	10,098	49.94%	24	0.12%	20,220
Garfield	522	52.78%	467	47.22%	55	5.56%	989
Grant	12,101	51.44%	11,423	48.56%	678	2.88%	23,524
Grays Harbor	12,407	52.50%	11,225	47.50%	1,182	5.00%	23,632
Island	17,274	49.43%	17,673	50.57%	-399	-1.14%	34,947
Jefferson	9,318	55.97%	7,330	44.03%	1,988	11.94%	16,648
King	421,762	51.85%	391,726	48.15%	30,036	3.69%	813,488
Kitsap	49,673	48.37%	53,014	51.63%	-3,341	-3.25%	102,687
Kittitas	7,910	53.77%	6,801	46.23%	1,109	7.54%	14,711
Klickitat	4,167	49.39%	4,270	50.61%	-103	-1.22%	8,437
Lewis	14,797	52.50%	13,389	47.50%	1,408	5.00%	28,186
Lincoln	2,530	54.75%	2,091	45.25%	439	9.50%	4,621
Mason	11,937	52.26%	10,904	47.74%	1,033	4.52%	22,841
Okanogan	7,118	51.06%	6,822	48.94%	296	2.12%	13,940
Pacific	4,271	50.48%	4,189	49.52%	82	0.97%	8,460
Pend Oreille	2,910	51.85%	2,702	48.15%	208	3.71%	5,612
Pierce	137,025	47.59%	150,877	52.41%	-13,852	-4.81%	287,902
San Juan	3,553	41.29%	5,052	58.71%	-1,499	-17.42%	8,605
Skagit	23,290	51.44%	21,988	48.56%	1,302	2.88%	45,278
Skamania	2,228	51.22%	2,122	48.78%	106	2.44%	4,350
Snohomish	145,528	50.25%	144,084	49.75%	1,444	0.50%	289,612
Spokane	92,086	48.16%	99,125	51.84%	-7,039	-3.68%	191,211
Stevens	9,355	51.74%	8,727	48.26%	628	3.47%	18,082
Thurston	67,964	59.75%	45,776	40.25%	22,188	19.51%	113,740
Wahkiakum	1,059	57.90%	770	42.10%	289	15.80%	1,829
Walla Walla	9,878	46.98%	11,147	53.02%	-1,269	-6.04%	21,025
Whatcom	39,286	43.88%	50,249	56.12%	-10,963	-12.24%	89,535
Whitman	7,288	50.92%	7,025	49.08%	263	1.84%	14,313
Yakima	30,378	45.89%	35,817	54.11%	-5,439	-8.22%	66,195
Totals	1,337,547	50.52%	1,309,896	49.48%	27,651	1.04%	2,647,443
