= Standards-based assessment =

Assessment based on specified standards

In an educational setting, standards-based assessment is assessment that relies on the evaluation of student understanding with respect to agreed-upon standards, also known as "outcomes". The standards set the criteria for the successful demonstration of the understanding of a concept or skill.

== Overview ==
In the standards-based paradigm, students have the freedom to demonstrate understanding in diverse ways, including (but not limited to) selected response (e.g. multiple choice tests), physical constructions, written responses, and performances. Of course, these are not new types of assessments, nor is the concept of differentiated assessment. The teacher uses all available observations and quantitative information to summarize learning with reference to a specific standard. With these data, a teacher can formulate the steps or actions that can be taken to gain mastery of a particular concept. That is, it aids in assessment for learning.

One of the key aspects of standards-based assessment is post-assessment feedback. The feedback a student receives from this type of assessment does not emphasize a score, percentage, or statistical average, but information about the expectations of performance as compared to the standard. A standards-based approach does not necessarily dismiss a summative grade, percentage, or a measure of central tendency (such as a mean, or median). However, an assessment that does not reference or give feedback with respect to a standard would not be standards-based. There is a large body of evidence that points to the effectiveness of appropriate feedback.

== Purpose ==
The purpose of standards-based assessment is to connect evidence of learning to learning outcomes (the standards). When standards are explicit and clear, the learner becomes aware of their achievement with reference to the standards, and the teacher may use assessment data to give meaningful feedback to students about this progress. The awareness of one's own learning allows students to point to a specific standard of achievement and so strengthens self-regulation and meta-cognition, two skills generally understood to be effective learning strategies.

== Framework of the standards-based approach in assessment ==
A common approach to standards-based assessment (SBA) is:

- Identify a key fact or important body of knowledge (e.g. a scientific theory, a mathematical relationship), the essential content and concepts.

Example from the British Columbia Grade 3 Curriculum Package (September 2010):

"It is expected that students will view and demonstrate comprehension of visual texts (e.g., cartoons, illustrations, diagrams, posters)"

Example from the New Zealand curriculum document Mathematics Standards for Years 1-8, by the end of year 5:

"In contexts that require them to solve problems or model situations, students will be able to create, continue, and predict further members of sequential patterns with two variables"

- Identify the indicators (i.e. evidence) that students will show when the concept or content has been understood.

Respectively to the example from the British Columbia Grade 3 Curriculum Package:

"describe key messages and images and relevant details in response to questions or activities"

- Choose a collection of assessments that will allow students to demonstrate the indicators.
- Using a scale or rubric, identify the proficiency of the student with respect to the standard. This progress is made accessible to the learner in order to provide meaningful feedback. Any feedback should be able to provide information on how the proficiency can be improved) and the educator needs to be aware of the effects of praise during feedback.
- Repeat instruction, assessment and feedback until the student achieves a predetermined level of mastery.

== Hallmarks ==
- Standards (i.e. learning outcomes) need to be visible and understandable by students
- Tasks, activities and assessments should be clear about which standard is being practiced
- Formative assessment should be used to give feedback to students about their progress towards a standard
- Assessment in general should be well-designed, accurate and high in validity to be fair and accessible
- Exemplars should be used to give students an understanding of how achievement against a standard is measured
- Rubrics should be used to assess performances and constructed responses
- Selective response (e.g. multiple choice) should be used to assess basic understanding and knowledge (as in Bloom's taxonomy) of a specific standard (or the underlying pre-requisite concepts associated with the standard)

== Geographical distinctions ==
=== United States ===
A standards-based test is an assessment based on the outcome-based education or performance-based education philosophy. Assessment is a key part of the standards reform movement. The first part is to set new, higher standards to be expected of every student. Then the curriculum must be aligned to the new standards. Finally, the student must be assessed if they meet these standards of what every student "must know and be able to do". In the United States, a high school diploma which is given on passing a high school graduation examination or Certificate of Initial Mastery is awarded only when these standards are achieved. It is fully expected that every child will become proficient in all areas of academic skills by the end of a period, typically 10 years in the United States, but sometimes longer, after the passing of education reform bill by a state legislature. The United States federal government, under No Child Left Behind can further require that all schools must demonstrate improvement among all students, even if they are already all over proficient.

==== Holistic grading ====
Rather than using computers to log responses to multiple choice tests, rubrics for state assessments such as in North Carolina ask scorers to look at the entire paper and make judgments. Scorers are not allowed to count errors, and rubrics do not contain numeric measurements of how many spelling or grammar error constitute a "1" or "2". The Analytical Writing section of the GRE test is scored using a six-point holistic scale in half-point increments. Holistic grading is one of the main reason for disagreement between scorers, but for this reason some tests are scored more than once to check for agreement.

==== Advantages ====
- Students are compared to a standard that all can reach, rather than artificially ranked into a bell curve where some students must be called failures, and only a few are allowed to succeed
- Humans, not computers can evaluate the entire value of a response rather than imposing a strict right or wrong that is not open to interpretation
- Free response uses and tests for higher order thinking, which is important in most new education standards.
- Computer scored multiple choice tests have been shown to have deleterious effects for minorities, unfairly denying opportunities.
- Only a standards-based test is aligned with standards-based education reform, which is based on a belief that all students can succeed, not only a few.
- Passing a 10th grade test and awarding a Certificate of Initial Mastery ensures that all students will graduate with the skills they need to succeed in the world-class economy of the twenty-first century.
- Students will no longer be cheated by passing them on to the next grade without obtaining what every child at the grade level must be able to know and do.
- When all students pass all standards, as is the central belief of standards-based education reform, all students from all demographics will achieve the same test score, eliminating the mysterious achievement gap which has previously been shown to occur between all groups on all tests. However, as of 2006, no standards-based assessment has yet achieved this optimistic (critics might call it impossible) goal, though many show rising scores.

==== Cons ====
Compared to a multiple-choice, norm-referenced test, a standards-based test can be recognized by:

- A cut score is determined for different levels of performance. There are no cut scores for norm-referenced tests. There is no failing score on the SAT test. Each college or institution sets their own score standards for admission or awards.
- Different levels of performance are set. Typically these are Above Standard, Meets Standard, Below Standard. These levels a typically set in a benchmarking process, even though such a process does not take into an account whether the test items are even appropriate for the grade level.
- Tests are holistically graded against a free-written response, often with pictures, rather than graded correct or incorrect among multiple choices.
- Tests are more expensive to grade because of this, typically $25–30 per test compared to $2–5, not including the cost of developing the test, typically different every year for every state.
- Tests are more difficult to grade because they are typically graded against a handful with no more than one or two example papers at each scoring level. They cannot be graded by computer
- Tests are less reliable. Agreement may fall between 60 and 80 percent on a 4-point scale and be considered to be accurate.
- Graders do not need teaching credentials, only a bachelor's degree in any field, and are typically paid $8 to $11 per hour for part-time work.
- Failure rates as high as 80 to 95 percent are not only not unusual, they are fully expected and announced as test programs are introduced to the local press. Under traditional graduation criteria, African Americans had achieved national graduation rates within a few points of whites. In 2006, three-quarters of African Americans who failed the WASL were promised by Superintendent Terry Bergeson that they would not get a diploma if they did not pass retakes of the test in two years, even though she had pledged earlier that "all students" would get a world class diploma.
- Failure rates for minorities and special education students are typically two to four times higher than for majority groups as extended response questions are more difficult to answer than multiple choice
- Content is often difficult even for adults to quickly answer, even at grade levels as low as the fourth grade, especially in mathematics. Professor Don Orlich called the WASL a "disaster", with math and science tests falling well above the normal development level of students at many grade levels.
- Mathematics has a high proportion of statistics and geometry, and a low content of simple arithmetic.
- Schools are scored as zero for students who do not take the test.
- Passing such a test at the 10th grade level is typically planned as being required for graduating high school.
- Passing such a test, rather than the 50th percentile, is defined as grade level performance.
- A question with a correct answer may be graded as incorrect if it does not show how the answer as arrived at. A question with an incorrect numerical conclusion may not necessarily be graded as wrong.
- California's first year of the CLAS test permitted no '4' high math grades, not even in the highest scoring schools, in order to leave room for improvement
- The North Carolina Writing project gave out less than 1 percent exemplary '4' scores. Such papers employed vocabulary and knowledge on a level sometimes exceeding that of the college graduate graders, and well above the intended audience of a high school graduation. This level would be even more difficult than achieving an SAT score sufficient for entry into an Ivy League private college.
- Scores typically rise much faster than standardized tests such as NAEP or SAT given over the same time period.

== See also ==
- Concept inventory – Knowledge assessment tool
- Educational assessment – Educational evaluation method
- Massachusetts Comprehensive Assessment System – Standards-based assessment
- Rubrics for assessment – Scoring guide for assessment
- Standardized test – Test administered and scored in a predetermined, standard manner
- Standards-based education reform in the United States
- Washington Assessment of Student Learning – Standardized test in Washington, United States
