= Orlich =

Orlich is a given name and a surname. Notable people with the name include:

- Francisco Orlich Bolmarcich (1907–1969), 34th President of Costa Rica (1962–1966)
- Dan Orlich (1924–2019), American football player
- Don Orlich, professor emeritus at Washington State University
- Sam L. Orlich, former member of the Wisconsin State Assembly

== See also ==
- Orlich Gniazd (Eagles' Nests Landscape Park) in south-western Poland
- Szlak Orlich Gniazd (Trail of the Eagle's Nests) south-western Poland
