= 2000 Washington Superintendent of Public Instruction election =

- November 7, 2000
Nominee	Terry Bergeson
Party	Independent
Popular vote	1,653,830
Percentage	100.00%
- Bergeson: 100%
Superintendent of Public Instruction before election
Terry Bergeson
Independent
Elected Superintendent of Public Instruction
Terry Bergeson
Independent

The 2000 Washington Superintendent of Public Instruction election was held on November 7, 2000, to elect the superintendent of public instruction of Washington, concurrently with the 2000 U.S. presidential election, as well as elections to the U.S. Senate and various state and local elections, including for U.S. House and governor of Washington. Incumbent superintendent of public instruction Terry Bergeson was re-elected to a second term unopposed.

== Primary election ==
Due to the nonpartisan nature of the office, there was a nonpartisan primary in which all candidates were listed on the same ballot, with the top two advancing to the general election if no candidate received a majority of the vote in the primary. The primary election was held on September 19.

=== Candidates ===
==== Advanced to general ====
- Terry Bergeson, incumbent state superintendent (1997–2009)

==== Eliminated in primary ====
- David Blomstrom, perennial candidate
- Donald B. Crawford
- Neil T.B. Helgeland
- Arthur Hu, software engineer

=== Results ===
Due to Bergeson receiving a majority of the vote in the primary election she was the only candidate to advance to the general election, in which she ran unopposed.

Blanket primary results
Party	Candidate	Votes	%
Nonpartisan	Terry Bergeson (incumbent)	611,578	57.20
Nonpartisan	Donald B. Crawford	165,632	15.49
Nonpartisan	Arthur Hu	150,240	14.05
Nonpartisan	David Blomstrom	85,134	7.96
Nonpartisan	Neil T.B. Helgeland	56,652	5.30
Total votes		1,069,236	100.00

== General election ==
=== Results ===
2000 Washington Superintendent of Public Instruction election
Party	Candidate	Votes	%
Nonpartisan	Terry Bergeson (incumbent)	1,653,830	100.00
Total votes		1,653,830	100.00
Democratic hold			
