= 2004 Washington Superintendent of Public Instruction election =

- November 2, 2004
Nominee	Terry Bergeson	Judith Billings
Party	Independent	Independent
Popular vote	1,293,560	1,036,912
Percentage	55.51%	44.49%
- Bergeson: 50–60% 60–70% Billings: 50–60%
Superintendent of Public Instruction before election
Terry Bergeson
Independent
Elected Superintendent of Public Instruction
Terry Bergeson
Independent

The 2004 Washington Superintendent of Public Instruction election was held on November 2, 2004, to elect the superintendent of public instruction of Washington, concurrently with the 2004 U.S. presidential election, as well as elections to the U.S. Senate and various state and local elections, including for U.S. House and governor of Washington. Incumbent superintendent of public instruction Terry Bergeson was re-elected to a third term in office, defeating former superintendent of public instruction Judith Billings. While the race was officially non-partisan, both Bergeson and Billings identified as Democrats.

== Primary election ==
Due to the nonpartisan nature of the office, this was the only Washington election in 2004 that had a nonpartisan primary in which all candidates were listed on the same ballot, with the top two advancing to the general election if no candidate received a majority of the vote in the primary. The primary election was held on September 14.

=== Candidates ===
==== Advanced to general ====
- Terry Bergeson, incumbent state superintendent (1997–2009)
- Judith Billings, former state superintendent (1989–1997)

==== Eliminated in primary ====
- John Blair, perennial candidate and former high school teacher
- David Blomstrom, perennial candidate
- Juanita Doyon, activist
- KumRoon Maksirisombat, educator

=== Results ===
Blanket primary election results
Party	Candidate	Votes	%
Nonpartisan	Terry Bergeson (incumbent)	366,200	36.24
Nonpartisan	Judith Billings	355,973	35.22
Nonpartisan	John Blair	91,914	9.10
Nonpartisan	Juanita Doyon	86,454	8.55
Nonpartisan	KumRoon Maksirisombat	55,679	5.51
Nonpartisan	David Blomstrom	54,370	5.38
Total votes		1,010,590	100.00

== General election ==
=== Endorsements ===
Terry Bergeson

Newspapers

- The Seattle Times

=== Results ===
2004 Washington Superintendent of Public Instruction election
Party	Candidate	Votes	%
Nonpartisan	Terry Bergeson (incumbent)	1,293,560	55.51
Nonpartisan	Judith Billings	1,036,912	44.49
Total votes		2,330,472	100.00
Democratic hold			

==== By county ====
County results
County	Terry Bergeson Democratic		Judith Billings Democratic		Margin		Total votes
County	#	%	#	%	#	%	Total votes
Adams	2,456	57.20%	1,838	42.80%	618	14.39%	4,294
Asotin	4,513	64.56%	2,477	35.44%	2,036	29.13%	6,990
Benton	32,396	60.31%	21,321	39.69%	11,075	20.62%	53,717
Chelan	12,279	51.22%	11,692	48.78%	587	2.45%	23,971
Clallam	15,879	56.33%	12,310	43.67%	3,569	12.66%	28,189
Clark	81,452	61.72%	50,518	38.28%	30,934	23.44%	131,970
Columbia	1,094	62.55%	655	37.45%	439	25.10%	1,749
Cowlitz	20,398	58.16%	14,673	41.84%	5,725	16.32%	35,071
Douglas	5,483	48.68%	5,781	51.32%	-298	-2.65%	11,264
Ferry	1,517	57.14%	1,138	42.86%	379	14.27%	2,655
Franklin	7,557	57.28%	5,635	42.72%	1,922	14.57%	13,192
Garfield	620	59.50%	422	40.50%	198	19.00%	1,042
Grant	12,611	57.90%	9,169	42.10%	3,442	15.80%	21,780
Grays Harbor	12,721	52.78%	11,383	47.22%	1,338	5.55%	24,104
Island	17,879	58.24%	12,820	41.76%	5,059	16.48%	30,699
Jefferson	8,508	55.29%	6,879	44.71%	1,629	10.59%	15,387
King	380,080	53.88%	325,381	46.12%	54,699	7.75%	705,461
Kitsap	56,818	56.10%	44,465	43.90%	12,353	12.20%	101,283
Kittitas	7,077	52.52%	6,397	47.48%	680	5.05%	13,474
Klickitat	4,253	59.90%	2,847	40.10%	1,406	19.80%	7,100
Lewis	13,916	52.35%	12,669	47.65%	1,247	4.69%	26,585
Lincoln	2,712	58.17%	1,950	41.83%	762	16.34%	4,662
Mason	12,409	59.07%	8,598	40.93%	3,811	18.14%	21,007
Okanogan	7,078	54.33%	5,949	45.67%	1,129	8.67%	13,027
Pacific	4,638	56.47%	3,575	43.53%	1,063	12.94%	8,213
Pend Oreille	2,887	56.79%	2,197	43.21%	690	13.57%	5,084
Pierce	137,207	51.87%	127,299	48.13%	9,908	3.75%	264,506
San Juan	4,348	55.45%	3,494	44.55%	854	10.89%	7,842
Skagit	24,452	56.24%	19,024	43.76%	5,428	12.49%	43,476
Skamania	2,375	58.60%	1,678	41.40%	697	17.20%	4,053
Snohomish	138,632	55.77%	109,956	44.23%	28,676	11.54%	248,588
Spokane	98,613	58.67%	69,481	41.33%	29,132	17.33%	168,094
Stevens	9,292	58.27%	6,655	41.73%	2,637	16.54%	15,947
Thurston	53,842	55.41%	43,325	44.59%	10,517	10.82%	97,167
Wahkiakum	1,045	60.76%	675	39.24%	370	21.51%	1,720
Walla Walla	11,537	61.44%	7,240	38.56%	4,297	22.88%	18,777
Whatcom	38,461	55.47%	30,876	44.53%	7,585	10.94%	69,337
Whitman	7,857	55.57%	6,283	44.43%	1,574	11.13%	14,140
Yakima	36,668	56.54%	28,187	43.46%	8,481	13.08%	64,855
Totals	1,293,560	55.51%	1,036,912	44.49%	256,648	11.01%	2,330,472
