= 2020 Washington Superintendent of Public Instruction election =

- November 3, 2020
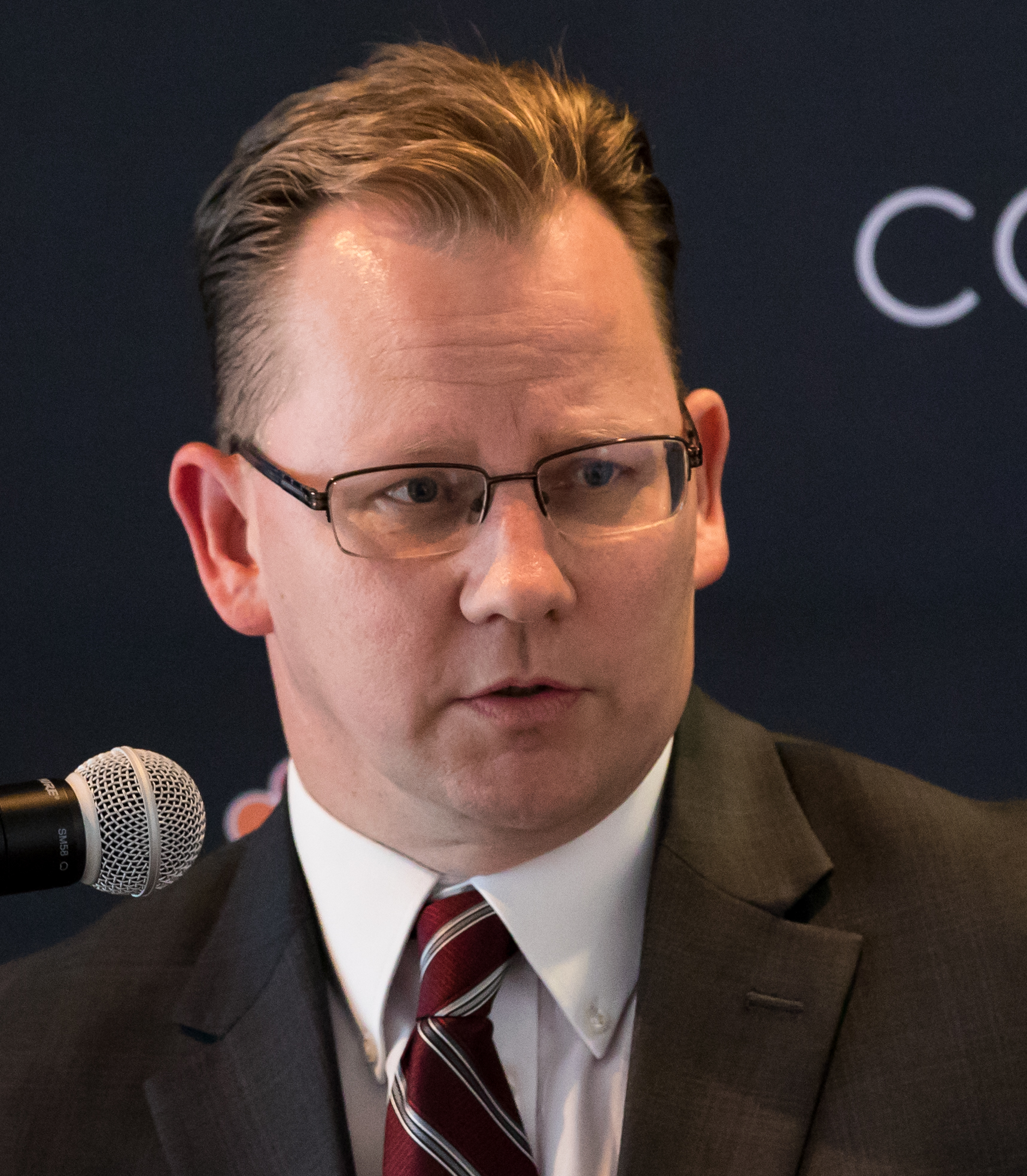

Nominee	Chris Reykdal	Maia Espinoza
Party	Independent	Independent
Popular vote	1,955,365	1,609,643
Percentage	54.57%	44.92%
- Reykdal: 50–60% 60–70% 70–80% Espinoza: 40–50% 50–60%
Superintendent of Public Instruction before election
Chris Reykdal
Independent
Elected Superintendent of Public Instruction
Chris Reykdal
Independent

The 2020 Washington Superintendent of Public Instruction election was held on November 3, 2020, to elect the superintendent of public instruction of Washington, concurrently with the 2020 U.S. presidential election, as well as elections to the U.S. Senate and various state and local elections, including for U.S. House and governor of Washington. Incumbent Superintendent of Public Instruction Chris Reykdal was re-elected to a second term, defeating challenger Maia Espinoza with 55% of the vote. While the race was officially non-partisan, Reykdal identified as a Democrat, while Espinoza identified as a Republican.

== Background ==
Incumbent Superintendent of Public Instruction Chris Reykdal, first elected in 2016 with 51% of the vote, ran for re-election to a second term in office.

== Primary election ==
Washington is one of two states that holds a top-two primary, meaning all candidates are listed on the same ballot regardless of party affiliation, and the top two advance to the general election.

=== Candidates ===
==== Advanced to general ====
- Chris Reykdal, incumbent state superintendent, former state representative, and former world history teacher
- Maia Espinoza, activist and Republican candidate for Washington House of Representatives in 2018

==== Eliminated in primary ====
- Ron Higgins, substitute teacher and retired engineer
- Stan Lippmann, perennial candidate
- David Spring, retired educator
- Dennis Wick, former member of the Snohomish School District board

=== Endorsements ===
Chris Reykdal

Newspapers

- The Seattle Times

=== Results ===
County results Reykdal: 20–30%; 30–40%; 40–50%; 50–60%; Espinoza: 20–30%; 30–40%; Higgins: 20–30%; 30–40%

Congressional district results Reykdal: 20–30%; 30–40%; 40–50%; 60–70%; Higgins: 20–30%; 30–40%

Blanket primary election results
Party	Candidate	Votes	%
Nonpartisan	Chris Reykdal (incumbent)	898,951	40.24
Nonpartisan	Maia Espinoza	564,674	25.28
Nonpartisan	Ron Higgins	456,879	20.45
Nonpartisan	Dennis Wick	121,425	5.44
Nonpartisan	David Spring	111,176	4.98
Nonpartisan	Stan Lippmann	71,395	3.20
Write-in		9,571	0.43
Total votes		2,234,071	100.00

== General election ==
=== Post-primary endorsements ===
Chris Reykdal

Executive branch officials

- Joe Biden, former Vice President of the United States (2009–2017) (Note: Elected president of the United States in the same election cycle.)

Labor unions

- Washington State Labor Council
- Pierce County Central Labor Council, AFL-CIO
- Washington State Council of Fire Fighters
- SEIU 775
- Service Employees International Union Local 925
- Teamsters Joint Council 28
- American Federation of State, County and Municipal Employees Council 28

Organizations

- Equal Rights Washington
- Reproductive Freedom for All
- League of Conservation Voters Washington

Newspapers

- The News Tribune
- The Stranger
- Northwest Asian Weekly
- The Columbian
- The Union-Bulletin
- The Yakima Herald
- Tri-City Herald
- The Olympian
Maia Espinoza

Organizations

- Washington Farm Bureau
- Human Life of Washington
- Mainstream Republicans of Washington

=== Polling ===
Poll source	Date(s) administered	Sample size (Note: Key: A – all adults RV – registered voters LV – likely voters V – unclear)	Margin of error	Chris Rekydal	Maia Espinoza	Undecided
Public Policy Polling (D) (Note: Poll sponsored by the Northwest Progressive Institute)	October 14–15, 2020	610 (LV)	± 4%	30%	23%	47%

=== Debates ===
2020 Washington Superintendent of Public Instruction election debates
No.	Date	Host	Moderator	Link	Nonpartisan	Nonpartisan
Key: P Participant A Absent N Not invited I Invited W Withdrawn						
Key: P Participant A Absent N Not invited I Invited W Withdrawn					Chris Reykdal	Maia Espinoza
1	Sep. 18, 2020	Washington State Wire		YouTube	P	P
2	Sep. 25, 2020	City Inside/Out	Brian Callahan	YouTube	P	P
3	Oct. 23, 2020	Rainier Avenue Radio	Kiantha Duncan; Taylor-Corrine Benton	YouTube	P	P

=== Results ===
2020 Washington Superintendent of Public Instruction election
Party	Candidate	Votes	%
Nonpartisan	Chris Reykdal (incumbent)	1,955,365	54.57
Nonpartisan	Maia Espinoza	1,609,643	44.92
Write-in		17,957	0.50
Total votes		3,582,965	100.00
Democratic hold			

==== By county ====
County results
County	Chris Reykdal Democratic		Maia Espinoza Republican		Write-in Various		Margin		Total votes
County	#	%	#	%	#	%	#	%	Total votes
Adams	2,205	42.31%	2,976	57.10%	31	0.59%	-771	-14.79%	5,212
Asotin	5,207	51.71%	4,788	47.55%	75	0.74%	419	4.16%	10,070
Benton	42,973	46.95%	48,069	52.51%	495	0.54%	-5,096	-5.57%	91,537
Chelan	18,927	50.54%	18,354	49.01%	170	0.45%	573	1.53%	37,451
Clallam	21,958	52.04%	20,064	47.55%	171	0.41%	1,894	4.49%	42,193
Clark	111,891	49.28%	113,428	49.96%	1,739	0.77%	-1,537	-0.68%	227,058
Columbia	986	48.22%	1,032	50.46%	27	1.32%	-46	-2.25%	2,045
Cowlitz	24,637	47.37%	27,030	51.97%	347	0.67%	-2,393	-4.60%	52,014
Douglas	8,397	44.83%	10,213	54.52%	122	0.65%	-1,816	-9.69%	18,732
Ferry	1,546	41.46%	2,156	57.82%	27	0.72%	-610	-16.36%	3,729
Franklin	11,796	40.20%	17,470	59.54%	78	0.27%	-5,674	-19.34%	29,344
Garfield	628	50.85%	600	48.58%	7	0.57%	28	2.27%	1,235
Grant	14,331	43.65%	18,334	55.84%	166	0.51%	-4,003	-12.19%	32,831
Grays Harbor	16,907	51.05%	16,031	48.41%	178	0.54%	876	2.65%	33,116
Island	24,091	51.95%	22,055	47.56%	229	0.49%	2,036	4.39%	46,375
Jefferson	13,164	60.94%	8,334	38.58%	103	0.48%	4,830	22.36%	21,601
King	688,203	64.54%	374,581	35.13%	3,567	0.33%	313,622	29.41%	1,066,351
Kitsap	72,954	52.86%	64,327	46.61%	728	0.53%	8,627	6.25%	138,009
Kittitas	11,109	49.18%	11,391	50.42%	90	0.40%	-282	-1.25%	22,590
Klickitat	5,358	47.72%	5,777	51.46%	92	0.82%	-419	-3.73%	11,227
Lewis	17,698	44.72%	21,636	54.67%	244	0.62%	-3,938	-9.95%	39,578
Lincoln	2,638	42.78%	3,499	56.74%	30	0.49%	-861	-13.96%	6,167
Mason	16,221	50.75%	15,448	48.33%	295	0.92%	773	2.42%	31,964
Okanogan	9,119	49.52%	9,163	49.76%	133	0.72%	-44	-0.24%	18,415
Pacific	6,310	52.58%	5,516	45.97%	174	1.45%	794	6.62%	12,000
Pend Oreille	3,236	44.47%	3,975	54.62%	66	0.91%	-739	-10.16%	7,277
Pierce	200,845	49.01%	206,786	50.46%	2,142	0.52%	-5,941	-1.45%	409,773
San Juan	6,957	61.44%	4,335	38.28%	32	0.28%	2,622	23.15%	11,324
Skagit	32,098	51.46%	29,933	47.99%	343	0.55%	2,165	3.47%	62,374
Skamania	3,094	50.01%	3,023	48.86%	70	1.13%	71	1.15%	6,187
Snohomish	205,763	52.36%	185,506	47.20%	1,731	0.44%	20,257	5.15%	393,000
Spokane	125,665	48.96%	129,034	50.28%	1,955	0.76%	-3,369	-1.31%	256,654
Stevens	10,123	41.61%	13,998	57.54%	207	0.85%	-3,875	-15.93%	24,328
Thurston	84,199	55.50%	66,411	43.78%	1,089	0.72%	17,788	11.73%	151,699
Wahkiakum	1,313	51.33%	1,237	48.36%	8	0.31%	76	2.97%	2,558
Walla Walla	13,892	49.75%	13,914	49.83%	118	0.42%	-22	-0.08%	27,924
Whatcom	66,322	53.52%	57,249	46.20%	350	0.28%	9,073	7.32%	123,921
Whitman	9,821	52.71%	8,703	46.71%	109	0.58%	1,118	6.00%	18,633
Yakima	42,783	49.48%	43,267	50.04%	419	0.48%	-484	-0.56%	86,469
Totals	1,955,365	54.57%	1,609,643	44.92%	17,957	0.50%	345,722	9.65%	3,582,965

==== By congressional district ====
Reykdal won seven of ten congressional districts.

District	Reykdal	Espinoza	Representative
1st	54%	46%	Suzan DelBene
2nd	54%	45%	Rick Larsen
3rd	49%	51%	Jaime Herrera Beutler
4th	47%	53%	Dan Newhouse
5th	49%	51%	Cathy McMorris Rodgers
6th	54%	46%	Derek Kilmer
7th	74%	26%	Pramila Jayapal
8th	51%	49%	Kim Schrier
9th	60%	40%	Adam Smith
10th	51%	49%	Denny Heck (116th Congress)
10th	51%	49%	Marilyn Strickland (117th Congress)

== Notes ==
Partisan clients
