= Learning standards =

Standards of what students at a given point should know

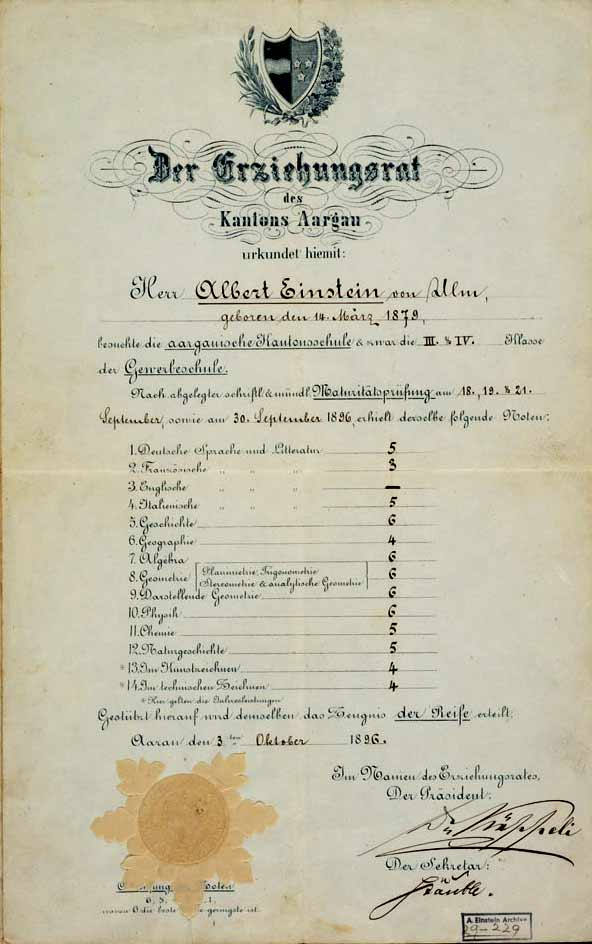
Einstein's school certificate, authorised by the Aargau education committee

Learning standards (also called academic standards, content standards and curricula) are elements of declarative, procedural, schematic, and strategic knowledge that, as a body, define the specific content of an educational program. Standards are usually composed of statements that express what a student knows, can do, or is capable of performing at a certain point in their "learning progression" (often designated by "grade", "class level", or its equivalent).

Learning standards have multiple uses in a modern education ecosystem. They can be links to content, and they can be part of a learning pathway or progression. Academic standards are the benchmarks of quality and excellence in education such as the rigour of curricula and the difficulty of examinations. The creation of universal academic standards requires agreement on rubrics, criteria or other systems of coding academic achievement. At colleges and universities, faculty are under increasing pressure from administrators to award students good marks and grades without regard for those students' actual abilities, both to keep those students in school paying tuition and to boost the schools' graduation rates. Students often use course evaluations to criticize any instructor who they feel has been making the course too difficult, even if an objective evaluation would show that the course has been too easy. It is very difficult to find a direct correlation between the quality of the course and the outcome of the course evaluations.

== Assessment ==
Student evaluations are a controversial method of assessing academic achievement. Recent studies have correlated high student evaluation of instructors with high grades rather than mastery of content. Studies have also noted that students' understanding of assessment criteria can lead to enhanced learning experiences.

== Globalization and academic standards ==
According to a 2009 report by UNESCO, changes in the university structure in the late 20th and early 21st century have led to increasing access to or "massification" of higher education which has, in turn, resulted in both a diversification of the student population but also a general decrease in academic standards globally.

== Examples ==
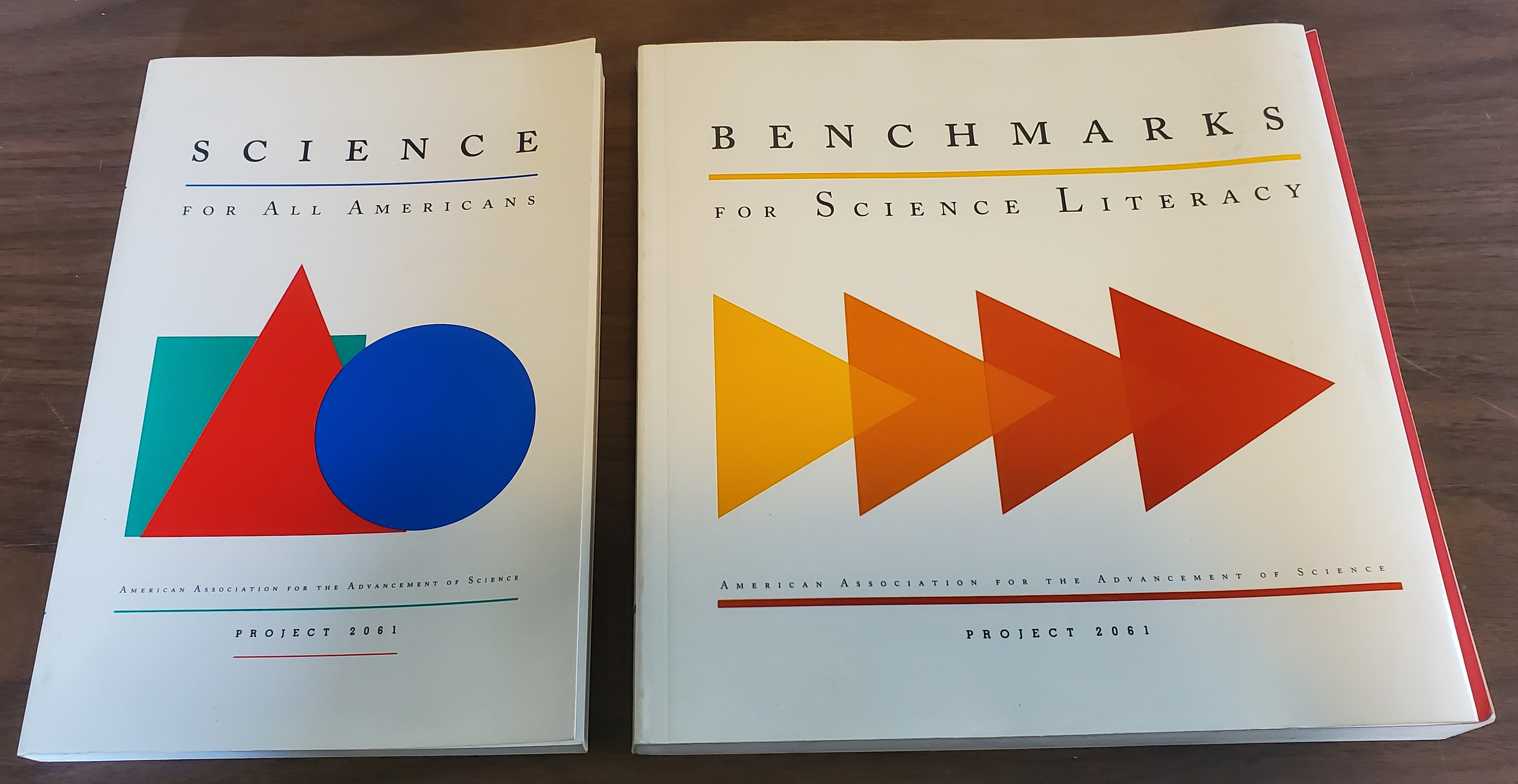
Benchmarks for Science Literacy, 1993. published by the AAAS Project 2061.

An example of learning standards are state-developed learning standards as described below or the Common Core State Standards (CCSS) developed by the NGA and the Council of Chief State School Officers (CCSSO).

State learning standards are developed by state boards of education and enforced by state education agencies across the US.

Learning standards are also present at the local level in curriculum published by school districts where they often take the form of guidelines by grade of what a student can or should be able to do, or possibly even activity level learning objectives. These often are based on the state standards but at a finer grain.

Learning standards can also take the form of learning objectives and content-specific standards and controlled vocabulary, as well as metadata about content. There are technical standards for encoding these standards that deal with K-12 learning environments, which are separate from those in higher education and private business.

== Types of academic standards ==
The Common Core is a group of academic standards which focus on two main subjects: mathematics and English language arts (ELA). These standards are intended to ensure mastery of information and prepare students for entry into the next grade and beyond. The core originated as a way to standardize the way students were taught from state-to-state, and also the quality of information students received. The Common Core has now been adopted by 42 states in the US.

The Common Core standards are:

- Research- and evidence-based
- Clear, understandable, and consistent
- Aligned with college and career expectations
- Based on rigorous and application of knowledge through higher order thinking skills
- Built upon the strengths and lessons of current state standards
- Informed by other top performing countries in order to prepare all students for success in our global economy and society

== United States ==
In the United States, textbooks such as Noah Webster's Speller promulgated specific knowledge to be taught to people at specific ages. Chicago superintendent William Harvey Wells expanded this approach by creating a course of instruction for Chicago Public Schools, which he codified in "A Graded Course of Instruction for Public Schools". Thus, the first learning standards originated as a result of content in textbooks, rather than through a systematic, democratic approach. In 1892, the National Education Association convened the Committee of Ten, which codified the first learning standards designed for a national high school audience. One year later, in 1893, the Committee of Fifteen on Elementary Education was formed to determine a standard number of years for elementary education, establish the content and sequence for elementary grades, and explicate a standardized course of training for elementary school teachers. However, the Committee of Fifteen's work focused primarily on defining the timing, content and teacher training for urban schools. As a result, the National Education Agency further formed the Committee of Twelve on the Rural School Problem and, in 1897, released a report intended to bring about the "...widespread consolidation of American rural schools, [to mirror] the conglomerating urban areas of the country...".

Later in the 20th century, the Core Knowledge Sequence developed by E. D. Hirsch may have contributed to cultural values espoused as learning standards and guides. The Knowledge Sequence provides a sequence for "... specific content (and skills) [to be] taught in English/language arts, history, geography, mathematics, science, and the fine arts" and had been adopted by some large school districts

In the US, regulation is at state level by bodies such as the Standards and Assessment Division of the Arizona Department of Education. At present, learning standards have become an important part of the standards-based education reform movement, in which learning standards are tied directly to rubrics and assessments in many schools; standardized tests are often used for grade-level evaluations within districts and states, and across states; standardized exams are used to graduate students in many US schools.

== United Kingdom ==
In the UK, degree awarding bodies themselves are responsible for standards in higher education, but these are checked during inspection by the Quality Assurance Agency for Higher Education (QAA) and the Office of Qualifications and Examinations Regulation (Ofqual). On its website QAA defines academic standards as 'The standards set and maintained by institutions for their courses (programmes and modules) and expected for their awards.'

The Dearing Report recommended in 1997 that benchmarking be used to measure and improve academic standards. From 1997 to 2011 this was done by code of practice and other guidelines known as the Academic Infrastructure. During 2012–13, this was replaced by the Quality Code for Higher Education, which included points about the availability of information about the learning experience to emphasize the role of the student as a paying customer of the institutions.

== Germany ==
In Germany the Kultusministerkonferenz (conference of ministers of education) defines, publishes and evaluates standards for different school graduation forms.

== Japan ==
Japan's Ministry of Education, Science, Sports and Culture of Japan manages National Curriculum Standards. These standards define the content for classes in Mathematics, Science, Japanese language, Social Studies, Life Environment Studies, Music, Drawing and Handicraft, Physical Education and Homemaking at the Kindergarten, Elementary, Lower and Upper Secondary levels.

== Singapore ==
Singapore utilizes syllabi to "[describe] the primary content expectations for each level through topic lists, which are similar to standards. Details are differentiated for students in different streams, or academic tracks. All students will study content through what is called the O-Level".

== See also ==
- Academic achievement
- Educational accreditation
- Educational aims and objectives
- Learning pathway
- Outcome-based education
- Standardized test
- U.S. No Child Left Behind Act
  - Adequate Yearly Progress
