= Mike Murphy (Washington politician) =

21st Treasurer of Washington

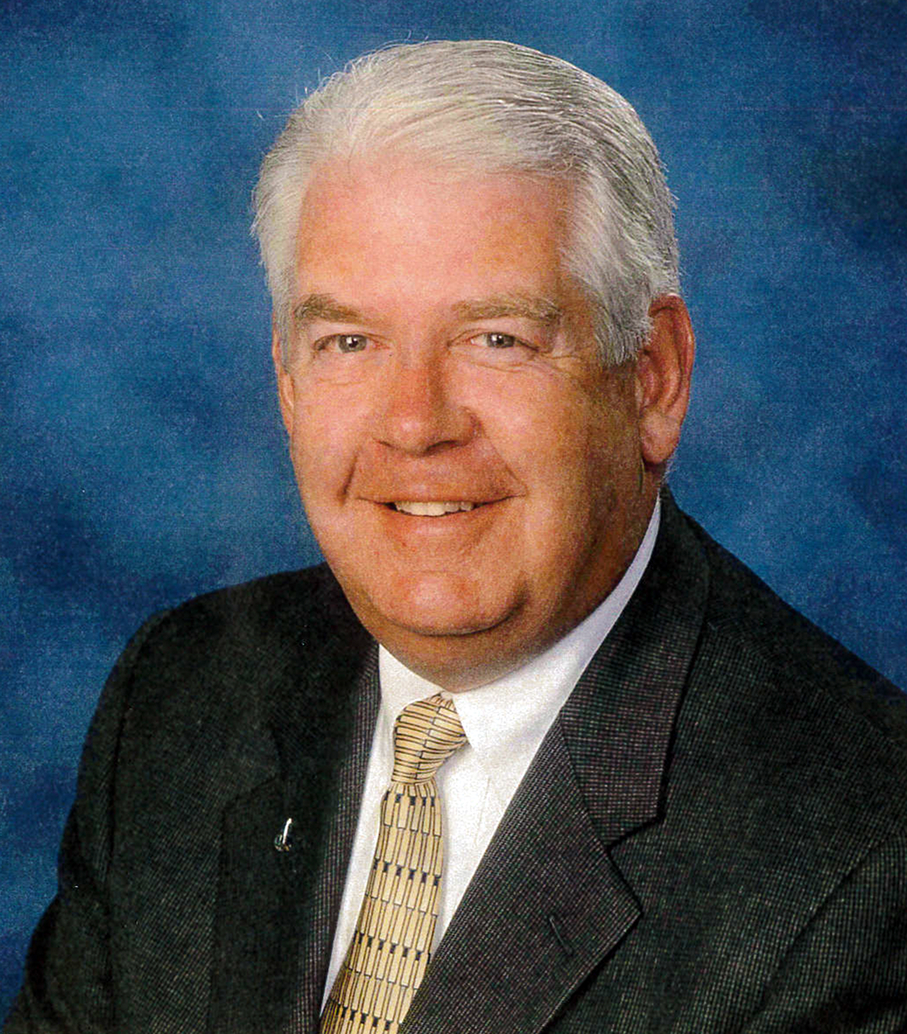

21st Treasurer of Washington
- In office January 15, 1997 – January 14, 2009
- Governor: Gary Locke; Christine Gregoire
- Preceded by: Dan Grimm
- Succeeded by: Jim McIntire

Personal details
- Party: Democratic
- Spouse: Teri Smith Murphy
- Education: Seattle University; Pacific Lutheran University

Military service
- Allegiance: United States
- Branch/service: United States Army

Michael J. Murphy is an American politician who served as the 21st Washington State Treasurer from 1997 to 2009 as a member of the Democratic Party.

== Early career ==
Murphy is a native of Seattle. He attended St. Edward Seminary in Kenmore, and earned a Bachelor of Arts degree in history from Seattle University in 1969.

After completing a tour of duty in the military, Murphy began work as a civil servant for the Office of the Washington State Treasurer (OST) in 1972. During his 15 years working for the OST, Murphy's assignments included administrator of the Public Deposit Protection Commission and internal auditor. In 1978, while working full-time for the OST, he completed his Master of Business Administration from Pacific Lutheran University.

In 1987, Murphy was appointed to serve as treasurer of Thurston County, the state's eighth-largest county. Later that year, he was elected to that office. He was re-elected in 1990 and 1994. Murphy has also previously served as President of the Western State Treasurers Association.

== Washington State Treasurer ==
In 1996, Murphy ran for State Treasurer. He won that election, as well as his races for re-election in 2000 and 2004. In 2004, Murphy received 60% of the vote, followed by Republican Oscar S. Lewis who received 36%. As State Treasurer, Murphy was one of ten voting members of the Washington State Investment Board, served as chair for the Board's Audit Committee, and was also a member of the Board's Private Markets Committee. He also chaired the State Finance Committee, which oversees the issuance and management of the state's debt. He was also one of twelve people appointed by the governor to the Washington State Housing Finance Commission (WSHFC). After serving three four-year terms, Murphy did not run for re-election in 2008, and James McIntire replaced him as Washington State Treasurer.

== Personal life ==
Murphy is the eldest son of a family of 11 children. Murphy and his wife, Teri Smith Murphy, live in Olympia on their sailboat.

== See also ==
- Washington State Executive elections, 2004
- Washington State Executive elections, 2008

Political offices
Preceded by Dan Grimm	Treasurer of Washington; 1997–2009	Succeeded by James McIntire
