= Chris Reykdal =

15th Washington Superintendent of Public Instruction

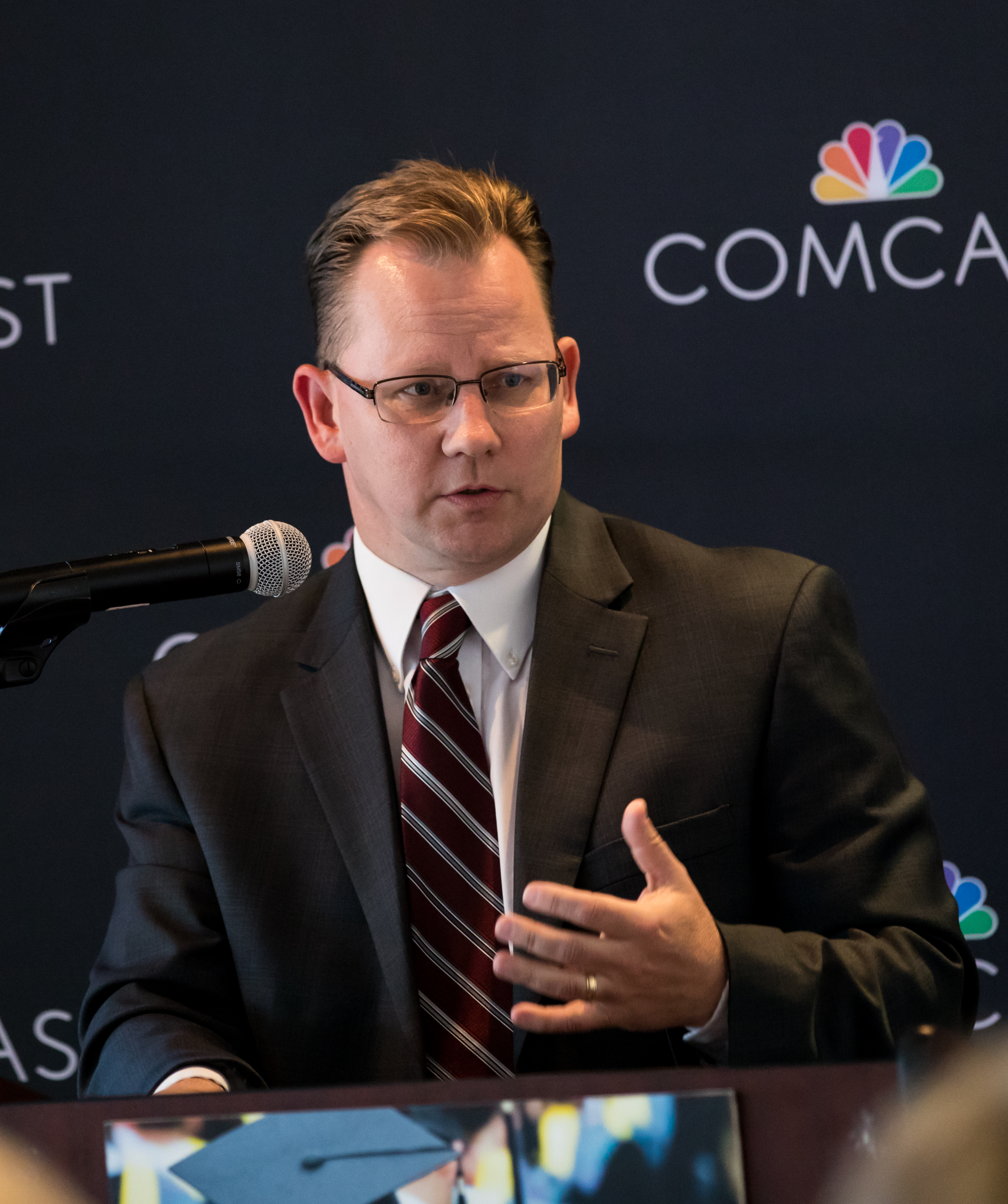
- Reykdal in 2017

15th Washington Superintendent of Public Instruction
- Incumbent
- Assumed office January 11, 2017
- Governor: Jay Inslee; Bob Ferguson
- Preceded by: Randy Dorn

Member of the Washington House of Representatives from the 22nd district
- In office January 10, 2011 – January 9, 2017
- Preceded by: Brendan Williams
- Succeeded by: Laurie Dolan

Personal details
- Born: Christopher Paul Simon Reykdal; September 12, 1972 (age 53) Snohomish, Washington, U.S.
- Party: Democratic
- Spouse: Kim Reykdal
- Children: 2
- Education: Washington State University, Pullman (BA); University of North Carolina, Chapel Hill (MPA)
- Website: Government website

Christopher Paul Simon Reykdal (born September 12, 1972) is an American educator and politician serving as the 15th Washington State Superintendent of Public Instruction since 2017. Previously, he served as a Democratic member of the Washington House of Representatives from the 22nd district for three terms.

== Early life and education ==
Reykdal was born in Snohomish, Washington on September 12, 1972. While attending Snohomish High School, Reykdal was elected student body president in 1989.

After high school, Reykdal attended Washington State University, graduating in 1994. He majored in social studies with minors in political science and geology. Reykdal also obtained his secondary teaching certificate at WSU. Reykdal graduated summa cum laude and as a member of the Phi Beta Kappa Honor Society.

== Career ==
After graduating, Reykdal taught American and world history at Mark Morris High School in Longview, Washington from 1994 and 1997. He then attended graduate school at University of North Carolina at Chapel Hill, earning his MPA. Reykdal then worked for the Washington State Senate as a fiscal analyst on the Senate Transportation Committee.

In 1999, Reykdal became the operating budget director for the State Board for Community and Technical Colleges. In 2002, he was promoted to deputy director for administration. By 2005, the Finance Division and the Administration Division merged, and Reykdal became the deputy executive director for administration and finance.

In December 2009, Reykdal announced his run for the Washington House of Representatives. In his run for the legislature, Reykdal was the leading Democratic vote-getter in the August primary. He faced Jason Hearn, a Lacey City Council member in the November 2010 general election. Reykdal won election to the State House with 61% of the vote. In 2012, Reykdal ran unopposed for a second term to the State House.

In the fall of 2013, Governor Jay Inslee called a special session of the legislature to adopt an $8.7 billion tax incentive package for Boeing. The session lasted 72 hours and the Boeing tax incentives were passed overwhelmingly in both the House and Senate. Reykdal was one of only 13 “no” votes in the legislature, and he later stated that the Boeing tax incentives put at risk billions of dollars for schools, higher education, and other vital services without guarantees from the company that there would be net job growth.

In November 2014 Reykdal defeated Republican Steve Owens (64% to 36%) for his third term in the State House of Representatives. Reykdal successfully passed a bill to provide financial assistance to low-income students who were taking college-level credits while still in high school (HB-1546). He was also the house lead on a bill to protect student data privacy.

On July 30, 2015, Reykdal announced that he was running for the Washington State Superintendent of Public Instruction in 2016. On November 8, 2016, Reykdal won against Erin Jones in a nonpartisan election. He later took office in January 2017.

After U.S. Representative Denny Heck's announcement that he would not seek another term in 2020, Reykdal was mentioned as a possible successor. Instead, Reykdal ran for reelection, defeating Maia Espinoza by ten percentage points.

On June 12, 2023, Reykdal announced that he was running for a third term in 2024. He was again reelected, this time with 53% of the vote against David Olson.

== Personal life ==
Reykdal lives in Tumwater, Washington with his wife and two children. He is Christian.

Reykdal's wife Kim is a school guidance counselor and member of the Tumwater School Board. She was nominated as one of four finalists for 2016 national Counselor of the Year.

Political offices
Preceded by Randy Dorn	Washington Superintendent of Public Instruction; 2017–present	Incumbent
