= Dan Grimm (politician) =

20th Treasurer of Washington

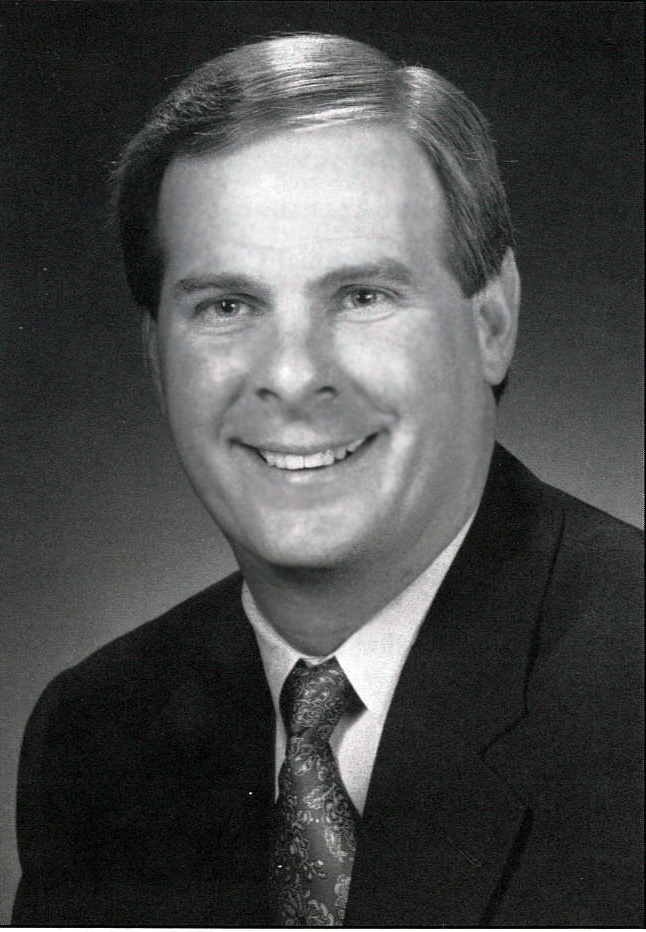

20th Treasurer of Washington
- In office January 11, 1989 – January 15, 1997
- Governor: Booth Gardner; Mike Lowry
- Preceded by: Robert S. O'Brien
- Succeeded by: Mike Murphy

Member of the Washington House of Representatives from the 25th district
- In office January 10, 1977 – January 9, 1989
- Preceded by: Marcus Gaspard
- Succeeded by: Randy Tate

Personal details
- Born: April 5, 1949 (age 77)
- Party: Democratic
- Spouse: Kathy Grimm
- Children: 1
- Education: Columbia University (BA)

Daniel K. Grimm (born April 5, 1949) is an American politician who served as the 20th Washington State Treasurer from 1989 to 1997. A member of the Democratic Party, he previously served as a member of the Washington House of Representatives, representing the 25th district from 1977 to 1989.

Political offices
Preceded by Robert S. O'Brien	Treasurer of Washington; 1989–1997	Succeeded by Mike Murphy
