= Don Orlich =

Don Orlich is an American academic. He is professor emeritus of the Science Mathematics Engineering Education Center at Washington State University.

== WASL research ==
He conducted an independent study of Washington's WASL standards based assessment, concluding, “The WASL is a disaster”. According to Orlich, the fifth grade science WASL exceeds the intellectual level of the majority of fifth graders, the seventh grade math WASL is more like a ninth grade test. Learning goals for the seventh grade is almost identical to many 10th grade goals.

Orlich published his findings in the book School Reform and the Great American Brain Robbery, in which he analyzed areas of the WASL using criteria from developmental psychology and the Scales of the National Assessment of Education Progress (NAEP). Additionally, Orlich argues that areas of the Grade Level Expectations (GLEs), and thus the WASL test, are developmentally inappropriate.

== Awards ==
Olich won a national award from the Association for Supervision and Curriculum Development for a critical analysis he wrote on the fourth-grade WASL, although the OSPI disagrees with the analysis.

== Publications ==
- Teaching Strategies: A guide to Effective Teaching (2004, Houghton Mifflin); co-author
