= 2004 Washington State Treasurer election =

- November 2, 2004
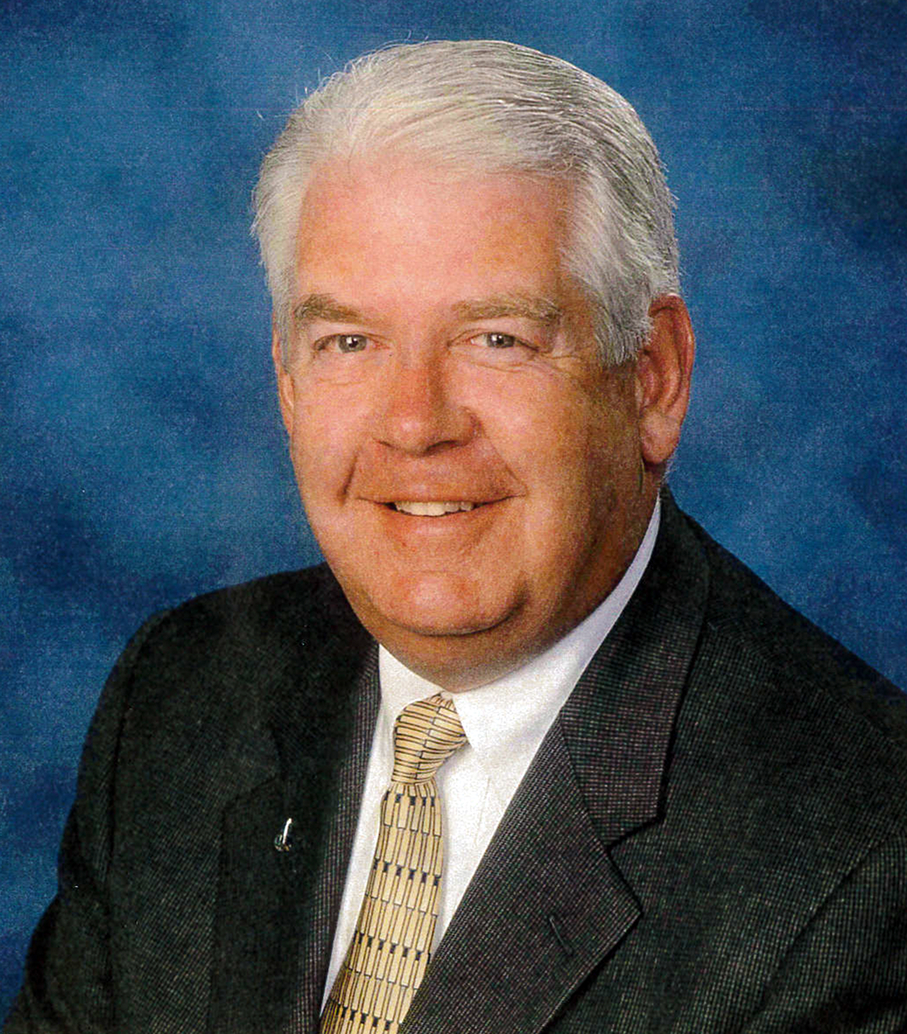

Nominee	Mike Murphy	Oscar S. Lewis
Party	Democratic	Republican
Popular vote	1,575,499	941,754
Percentage	60.29%	36.04%
- Murphy: 40–50% 50–60% 60–70% Lewis: 40–50% 50–60%
State Treasurer before election
Mike Murphy
Democratic
Elected State Treasurer
Mike Murphy
Democratic

The 2004 Washington State Treasurer election was held on November 2, 2004, to elect the Washington State Treasurer, concurrently with the 2004 U.S. presidential election, as well as elections to the U.S. Senate and various state and local elections, including for U.S. House and governor of Washington. Primary elections took place on September 14.

Incumbent Democratic State Treasurer Mike Murphy, first elected back in 1996, was re-elected to a third term in office, defeating Republican Oscar S. Lewis with 60% of the vote.

== Democratic primary ==
=== Candidates ===
==== Nominee ====
- Mike Murphy, incumbent state treasurer (1997–2009)

=== Results ===
Democratic primary results
Party	Candidate	Votes	%
Democratic	Mike Murphy (incumbent)	614,670	100.00%
Total votes		614,670	100.00%

== Republican primary ==
=== Candidates ===
==== Nominee ====
- Oscar S. Lewis, businessman

=== Results ===
Republican primary results
Party	Candidate	Votes	%
Republican	Oscar S. Lewis	417,943	100.00%
Total votes		417,943	100.00%

== Libertarian primary ==
=== Candidates ===
==== Nominee ====
- John Sample, businessman

=== Results ===
Libertarian primary results
Party	Candidate	Votes	%
Libertarian	John Sample	12,726	100.00%
Total votes		12,726	100.00%

== General election ==
=== Endorsements ===
Mike Murphy (D)

Newspapers

- The Seattle Times

=== Results ===
2004 Washington State Treasurer election
Party	Candidate	Votes	%	±%
Democratic	Mike Murphy (incumbent)	1,575,499	60.29	+4.46
Republican	Oscar S. Lewis	941,754	36.04	–3.86
Libertarian	John Sample	96,144	3.68	–0.59
Total votes		2,613,397	100.00	N/A
Democratic hold				

==== By county ====
County	Mike Murphy Democratic		Oscar S. Lewis Republican		John Sample Libertarian		Margin		Total votes cast
County	#	%	#	%	#	%	#	%	Total votes cast
Adams	2,007	42.97%	2,553	54.66%	111	2.38%	-546	-11.69%	4,671
Asotin	4,190	51.51%	3,730	45.86%	214	2.63%	460	5.66%	8,134
Benton	26,713	43.76%	32,136	52.65%	2,189	3.59%	-5,423	-8.88%	61,038
Chelan	12,621	47.07%	13,257	49.44%	934	3.48%	-636	-2.37%	26,812
Clallam	18,344	55.01%	13,539	40.60%	1,463	4.39%	4,805	14.41%	33,346
Clark	82,995	53.62%	66,160	42.74%	5,640	3.64%	16,835	10.88%	154,795
Columbia	882	46.94%	930	49.49%	67	3.57%	-48	-2.55%	1,879
Cowlitz	24,390	61.53%	13,749	34.69%	1,497	3.78%	10,641	26.85%	39,636
Douglas	5,624	45.48%	6,400	51.75%	342	2.77%	-776	-6.28%	12,366
Ferry	1,463	48.44%	1,399	46.32%	158	5.23%	64	2.12%	3,020
Franklin	6,937	45.64%	7,794	51.28%	468	3.08%	-857	-5.64%	15,199
Garfield	534	45.49%	600	51.11%	40	3.41%	-66	-5.62%	1,174
Grant	10,399	43.01%	12,962	53.61%	817	3.38%	-2,563	-10.60%	24,178
Grays Harbor	17,852	68.44%	7,285	27.93%	949	3.64%	10,567	40.51%	26,086
Island	18,987	53.89%	15,061	42.75%	1,186	3.37%	3,926	11.14%	35,234
Jefferson	11,387	65.74%	5,187	29.95%	747	4.31%	6,200	35.79%	17,321
King	553,584	68.92%	220,349	27.43%	29,332	3.65%	333,235	41.49%	803,265
Kitsap	65,132	59.02%	40,981	37.14%	4,238	3.84%	24,151	21.89%	110,351
Kittitas	7,690	52.57%	6,352	43.42%	586	4.01%	1,338	9.15%	14,628
Klickitat	4,354	52.29%	3,572	42.90%	401	4.82%	782	9.39%	8,327
Lewis	14,011	47.86%	14,028	47.92%	1,236	4.22%	-17	-0.06%	29,275
Lincoln	2,296	44.77%	2,664	51.94%	169	3.29%	-368	-7.17%	5,129
Mason	14,184	60.69%	8,229	35.21%	960	4.11%	5,955	25.48%	23,373
Okanogan	7,244	48.81%	6,850	46.15%	748	5.04%	394	2.65%	14,842
Pacific	6,048	63.79%	3,049	32.16%	384	4.05%	2,999	31.63%	9,481
Pend Oreille	2,842	49.89%	2,565	45.02%	290	5.09%	277	4.86%	5,697
Pierce	171,639	59.05%	109,059	37.52%	9,980	3.43%	62,580	21.53%	290,678
San Juan	6,054	66.14%	2,590	28.29%	510	5.57%	3,464	37.84%	9,154
Skagit	27,413	56.55%	19,190	39.59%	1,872	3.86%	8,223	16.96%	48,475
Skamania	2,564	54.77%	1,835	39.20%	282	6.02%	729	15.57%	4,681
Snohomish	162,101	59.37%	100,963	36.97%	9,994	3.66%	61,138	22.39%	273,058
Spokane	102,307	54.73%	77,719	41.58%	6,899	3.69%	24,588	13.15%	186,925
Stevens	8,167	44.83%	9,182	50.40%	870	4.78%	-1,015	-5.57%	18,219
Thurston	69,998	67.08%	30,525	29.25%	3,825	3.67%	39,473	37.83%	104,348
Wahkiakum	1,169	58.57%	741	37.12%	86	4.31%	428	21.44%	1,996
Walla Walla	10,542	50.56%	9,669	46.37%	641	3.07%	873	4.19%	20,852
Whatcom	46,883	58.08%	30,693	38.02%	3,147	3.90%	16,190	20.06%	80,723
Whitman	8,874	54.34%	6,822	41.77%	635	3.89%	2,052	12.57%	16,331
Yakima	35,078	51.06%	31,385	45.68%	2,237	3.26%	3,693	5.38%	68,700
Totals	1,575,499	60.29%	941,754	36.04%	96,144	3.68%	633,745	24.25%	2,613,397

Counties that flipped from Republican to Democratic

- Ferry (largest city: Republic)
- Klickitat (largest city: Goldendale)
- Okanogan (largest city: Omak)
- Yakima (largest city: Yakima)
