= 2008 Washington Superintendent of Public Instruction election =

- November 4, 2008
Nominee	Randy Dorn	Terry Bergeson
Party	Independent	Independent
Popular vote	1,333,290	1,211,909
Percentage	52.38%	47.62%
- Dorn: 50–60% Bergeson: 50–60%
Superintendent of Public Instruction before election
Terry Bergeson
Independent
Elected Superintendent of Public Instruction
Randy Dorn
Independent

The 2008 Washington Superintendent of Public Instruction election was held on November 4, 2008, to elect the superintendent of public instruction of Washington, concurrently with the 2008 U.S. presidential election, as well as elections to the U.S. Senate and various state and local elections, including for U.S. House and governor of Washington. Incumbent Superintendent of Public Instruction Terry Bergeson ran for re-election to a fourth term in office but was defeated by former state Representative Randy Dorn. While the race was officially non-partisan, both Bergeson and Dorn identified as Democrats.

== Primary election ==
Washington is one of two states that holds a top-two primary, meaning all candidates are listed on the same ballot regardless of party affiliation, and the top two advance to the general election.

=== Candidates ===
==== Advanced to general ====
- Terry Bergeson, incumbent state superintendent (1997–2009)
- Randy Dorn, former state representative

==== Eliminated in primary ====
- John P. Blair, perennial candidate and former high school teacher
- David Blomstrom, perennial candidate
- Enid Duncan
- Don Hansler, retired educator

=== Results ===
County results Bergeson: 30–40%; 40–50%; Dorn: 30–40%; 40–50%

Congressional district results Bergeson: 30–40%; 40–50%; Dorn: 30–40%

Blanket primary results
Party	Candidate	Votes	%
Nonpartisan	Terry Bergeson (incumbent)	477,130	39.31
Nonpartisan	Randy Dorn	414,313	34.13
Nonpartisan	Don Hansler	108,984	8.98
Nonpartisan	John P. Blair	90,508	7.46
Nonpartisan	Enid Duncan	78,983	6.51
Nonpartisan	David Blomstrom	43,984	3.62
Total votes		1,213,902	100.00

== General election ==
=== Endorsements ===
Terry Bergeson

Newspapers

- The Seattle Times

=== Polling ===
Poll source	Date(s) administered	Sample size	Margin of error	Terry Bergeson	Randy Dorn	Undecided
SurveyUSA	October 30 – November 2, 2008	663 (LV)	± 3.9%	37%	45%	18%
SurveyUSA	October 26–27, 2008	630 (LV)	± 4.0%	38%	43%	19%
SurveyUSA	October 12–13, 2008	544 (LV)	± 4.3%	31%	43%	26%
SurveyUSA	September 21–22, 2008	682 (LV)	± 3.8%	35%	40%	25%
SurveyUSA	September 5–7, 2008	658 (LV)	± 3.9%	36%	41%	23%
SurveyUSA	August 11–12, 2008	718 (LV)	± 3.7%	32%	43%	25%
SurveyUSA	July 13–15, 2008	666 (LV)	± 3.9%	34%	32%	35%

=== Results ===
2008 Washington Superintendent of Public Instruction election
Party	Candidate	Votes	%
Nonpartisan	Randy Dorn	1,333,290	52.38
Nonpartisan	Terry Bergeson (incumbent)	1,211,909	47.62
Total votes		2,545,199	100.00
Democratic hold			

==== By county ====
County results
County	Terry Bergeson Democratic		Randy Dorn Democratic		Margin		Total votes
County	#	%	#	%	#	%	Total votes
Adams	2,075	48.44%	2,209	51.56%	134	3.13%	4,284
Asotin	4,699	55.93%	3,702	44.07%	-997	-11.87%	8,401
Benton	26,766	41.68%	37,456	58.32%	10,690	16.65%	64,222
Chelan	12,054	43.83%	15,445	56.17%	3,391	12.33%	27,499
Clallam	17,026	52.57%	15,363	47.43%	-1,663	-5.13%	32,389
Clark	74,759	50.31%	73,842	49.69%	-917	-0.62%	148,601
Columbia	1,052	54.37%	883	45.63%	-169	-8.73%	1,935
Cowlitz	20,832	54.52%	17,378	45.48%	-3,454	-9.04%	38,210
Douglas	5,398	40.33%	7,988	59.67%	2,590	19.35%	13,386
Ferry	1,516	52.06%	1,396	47.94%	-120	-4.12%	2,912
Franklin	7,506	43.11%	9,905	56.89%	2,399	13.78%	17,411
Garfield	607	52.87%	541	47.13%	-66	-5.75%	1,148
Grant	11,397	47.28%	12,710	52.72%	1,313	5.45%	24,107
Grays Harbor	11,809	45.72%	14,019	54.28%	2,210	8.56%	25,828
Island	16,698	47.17%	18,699	52.83%	2,001	5.65%	35,397
Jefferson	8,718	52.90%	7,761	47.10%	-957	-5.81%	16,479
King	352,267	48.13%	379,702	51.87%	27,435	3.75%	731,969
Kitsap	50,485	46.84%	57,290	53.16%	6,805	6.31%	107,775
Kittitas	6,785	45.11%	8,257	54.89%	1,472	9.79%	15,042
Klickitat	4,376	53.70%	3,773	46.30%	-603	-7.40%	8,149
Lewis	13,571	45.03%	16,569	54.97%	2,998	9.95%	30,140
Lincoln	2,374	45.63%	2,829	54.37%	455	8.74%	5,203
Mason	11,661	46.55%	13,390	53.45%	1,729	6.90%	25,051
Okanogan	6,840	48.84%	7,166	51.16%	326	2.33%	14,006
Pacific	4,967	53.46%	4,324	46.54%	-643	-6.92%	9,291
Pend Oreille	2,816	50.54%	2,756	49.46%	-60	-1.08%	5,572
Pierce	129,755	45.01%	158,539	54.99%	28,784	9.98%	288,294
San Juan	4,575	54.62%	3,801	45.38%	-774	-9.24%	8,376
Skagit	21,587	45.52%	25,841	54.48%	4,254	8.97%	47,428
Skamania	2,426	55.14%	1,974	44.86%	-452	-10.27%	4,400
Snohomish	121,321	43.90%	155,011	56.10%	33,690	12.19%	276,332
Spokane	97,095	51.33%	92,080	48.67%	-5,015	-2.65%	189,175
Stevens	8,931	47.84%	9,736	52.16%	805	4.31%	18,667
Thurston	50,824	46.53%	58,396	53.47%	7,572	6.93%	109,220
Wahkiakum	1,061	58.65%	748	41.35%	-313	-17.30%	1,809
Walla Walla	11,881	56.64%	9,095	43.36%	-2,786	-13.28%	20,976
Whatcom	39,859	48.47%	42,375	51.53%	2,516	3.06%	82,234
Whitman	7,383	50.70%	7,180	49.30%	-203	-1.39%	14,563
Yakima	36,157	52.16%	33,161	47.84%	-2,996	-4.32%	69,318
Totals	1,211,909	47.62%	1,333,290	52.38%	121,381	4.77%	2,545,199
