= 2000 Washington State Treasurer election =

- November 7, 2000
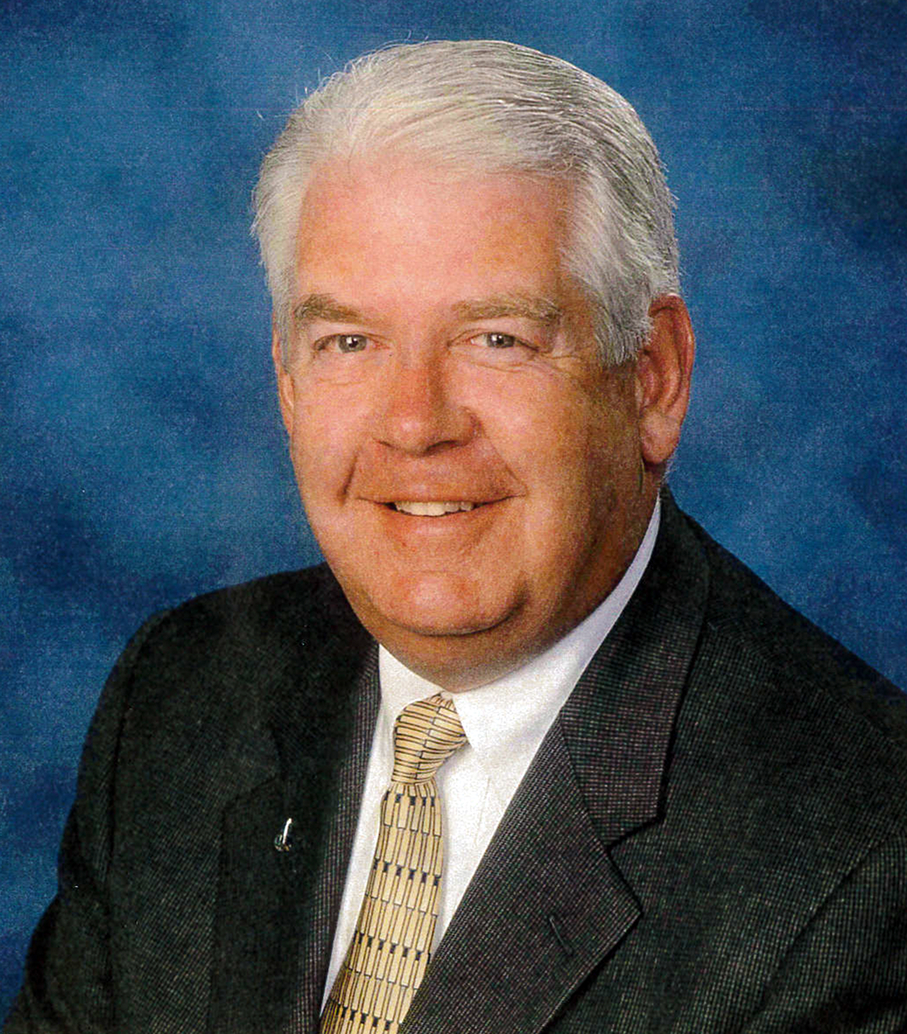

| Nominee | Mike Murphy | Diane Rhoades |
| Party | Democratic | Republican |
| Popular vote | 1,266,969 | 905,401 |
| Percentage | 55.83% | 39.90% |
- Murphy: 40–50% 50–60% 60–70% Rhoades: 40–50% 50–60%
State Treasurer before election
Mike Murphy
Democratic
Elected State Treasurer
Mike Murphy
Democratic

The 2000 Washington State Treasurer election was held on November 7, 2000, to elect the Washington State Treasurer, concurrently with the 2000 U.S. presidential election, as well as elections to the U.S. Senate and various state and local elections, including for U.S. House and governor of Washington.

Incumbent Democratic State Treasurer Mike Murphy, first elected in 1996, was re-elected to a second term in office, defeating Republican Diane Rhoades with 56% of the vote.

== Candidates ==
=== Democratic Party ===
==== Advanced to general ====
- Mike Murphy, incumbent state treasurer (1997–2009)

==== Eliminated in primary ====
- Louis Bloom

=== Republican Party ===
==== Advanced to general ====
- Diane Rhoades, Orting School Board member

=== Libertarian Party ===
==== Advanced to general ====
- Tim Perman

== Primary election ==
The blanket primary was held on September 19.

=== Results ===
Blanket primary election results
| Party | Candidate | Votes | % |
|---|---|---|---|
| Democratic | Mike Murphy (incumbent) | 538,873 | 46.78 |
| Republican | Diane Rhoades | 477,770 | 41.47 |
| Democratic | Louis Bloom | 76,738 | 6.66 |
| Libertarian | Tim Perman | 58,661 | 5.09 |
| Total votes | | 1,152,042 | 100.00 |

== General election ==
=== Results ===
2000 Washington State Treasurer election
| Party | Candidate | Votes | % | ±% |
|---|---|---|---|---|
| Democratic | Mike Murphy (incumbent) | 1,266,969 | 55.83 | +0.68 |
| Republican | Diane Rhoades | 905,401 | 39.90 | –4.95 |
| Libertarian | Tim Perman | 96,910 | 4.27 | N/A |
| Total votes | | 2,269,280 | 100.00 | N/A |
| Democratic hold | | | | |

==== By county ====
| County | Mike Murphy Democratic | | Diane Rhoades Republican | | Tim Perman Libertarian | | Margin | | Total votes cast |
| County | # | % | # | % | # | % | # | % | Total votes cast |
|---|---|---|---|---|---|---|---|---|---|
| Adams | 2,036 | 44.44% | 2,420 | 52.83% | 125 | 2.73% | -384 | -8.38% | 4,581 |
| Asotin | 3,786 | 51.83% | 3,249 | 44.48% | 269 | 3.68% | 537 | 7.35% | 7,304 |
| Benton | 24,213 | 44.11% | 28,679 | 52.24% | 2,004 | 3.65% | -4,466 | -8.14% | 54,896 |
| Chelan | 10,397 | 42.98% | 12,865 | 53.19% | 927 | 3.83% | -2,468 | -10.20% | 24,189 |
| Clallam | 14,623 | 49.88% | 12,966 | 44.23% | 1,727 | 5.89% | 1,657 | 5.65% | 29,316 |
| Clark | 61,329 | 49.14% | 57,649 | 46.19% | 5,821 | 4.66% | 3,680 | 2.95% | 124,799 |
| Columbia | 861 | 44.84% | 986 | 51.35% | 73 | 3.80% | -125 | -6.51% | 1,920 |
| Cowlitz | 19,367 | 56.77% | 13,416 | 39.32% | 1,333 | 3.91% | 5,951 | 17.44% | 34,116 |
| Douglas | 5,194 | 43.42% | 6,349 | 53.07% | 420 | 3.51% | -1,155 | -9.65% | 11,963 |
| Ferry | 1,217 | 43.17% | 1,413 | 50.12% | 189 | 6.70% | -196 | -6.95% | 2,819 |
| Franklin | 5,994 | 45.72% | 6,616 | 50.46% | 501 | 3.82% | -622 | -4.74% | 13,111 |
| Garfield | 553 | 46.08% | 603 | 50.25% | 44 | 3.67% | -50 | -4.17% | 1,200 |
| Grant | 9,260 | 41.30% | 12,247 | 54.62% | 916 | 4.09% | -2,987 | -13.32% | 22,423 |
| Grays Harbor | 16,197 | 65.62% | 7,416 | 30.05% | 1,069 | 4.33% | 8,781 | 35.58% | 24,682 |
| Island | 14,602 | 48.47% | 14,347 | 47.62% | 1,176 | 3.90% | 255 | 0.85% | 30,125 |
| Jefferson | 8,597 | 58.38% | 5,327 | 36.17% | 802 | 5.45% | 3,270 | 22.21% | 14,726 |
| King | 440,872 | 62.89% | 229,880 | 32.79% | 30,246 | 4.31% | 210,992 | 30.10% | 700,998 |
| Kitsap | 52,642 | 54.67% | 39,400 | 40.92% | 4,252 | 4.42% | 13,242 | 13.75% | 96,294 |
| Kittitas | 6,347 | 48.64% | 6,151 | 47.14% | 550 | 4.22% | 196 | 1.50% | 13,048 |
| Klickitat | 3,440 | 46.44% | 3,550 | 47.93% | 417 | 5.63% | -110 | -1.49% | 7,407 |
| Lewis | 12,392 | 44.55% | 14,059 | 50.55% | 1,363 | 4.90% | -1,667 | -5.99% | 27,814 |
| Lincoln | 1,830 | 39.41% | 2,623 | 56.49% | 190 | 4.09% | -793 | -17.08% | 4,643 |
| Mason | 11,825 | 56.60% | 8,066 | 38.61% | 1,001 | 4.79% | 3,759 | 17.99% | 20,892 |
| Okanogan | 5,739 | 42.30% | 7,065 | 52.08% | 762 | 5.62% | -1,326 | -9.77% | 13,566 |
| Pacific | 5,301 | 60.86% | 3,012 | 34.58% | 397 | 4.56% | 2,289 | 26.28% | 8,710 |
| Pend Oreille | 2,340 | 47.54% | 2,286 | 46.44% | 296 | 6.01% | 54 | 1.10% | 4,922 |
| Pierce | 136,254 | 54.76% | 102,504 | 41.20% | 10,061 | 4.04% | 33,750 | 13.56% | 248,819 |
| San Juan | 4,436 | 58.35% | 2,717 | 35.74% | 449 | 5.91% | 1,719 | 22.61% | 7,602 |
| Skagit | 21,332 | 51.15% | 18,576 | 44.54% | 1,800 | 4.32% | 2,756 | 6.61% | 41,708 |
| Skamania | 1,860 | 47.10% | 1,723 | 43.63% | 366 | 9.27% | 137 | 3.47% | 3,949 |
| Snohomish | 129,810 | 55.67% | 93,448 | 40.08% | 9,914 | 4.25% | 36,362 | 15.59% | 233,172 |
| Spokane | 83,596 | 52.76% | 69,031 | 43.57% | 5,818 | 3.67% | 14,565 | 9.19% | 158,445 |
| Stevens | 6,846 | 41.37% | 8,569 | 51.78% | 1,134 | 6.85% | -1,723 | -10.41% | 16,549 |
| Thurston | 58,290 | 63.87% | 29,053 | 31.84% | 3,916 | 4.29% | 29,237 | 32.04% | 91,259 |
| Wahkiakum | 946 | 53.18% | 754 | 42.38% | 79 | 4.44% | 192 | 10.79% | 1,779 |
| Walla Walla | 9,628 | 49.22% | 9,219 | 47.13% | 714 | 3.65% | 409 | 2.09% | 19,561 |
| Whatcom | 34,273 | 51.99% | 28,683 | 43.51% | 2,968 | 4.50% | 5,590 | 8.48% | 65,924 |
| Whitman | 7,489 | 51.12% | 6,581 | 44.92% | 579 | 3.95% | 908 | 6.20% | 14,649 |
| Yakima | 31,255 | 47.79% | 31,903 | 48.78% | 2,242 | 3.43% | -648 | -0.99% | 65,400 |
| Totals | 1,266,969 | 55.83% | 905,401 | 39.90% | 96,910 | 4.27% | 361,568 | 15.93% | 2,269,280 |

Counties that flipped from Democratic to Republican

- Ferry (largest city: Republic)
- Garfield (largest city: Pomeroy)
- Klickitat (largest city: Goldendale)
- Okanogan (largest city: Omak)

Counties that flipped from Republican to Democratic

- Island (largest city: Oak Harbor)
