= Terry Bergeson =

13th Washington Superintendent of Public Instruction

13th Washington Superintendent of Public Instruction
- In office January 15, 1997 – January 14, 2009
- Governor: Gary Locke; Christine Gregoire
- Preceded by: Judith Billings
- Succeeded by: Randy Dorn

Personal details
- Born: October 5, 1942 (age 84) Massachusetts, U.S.
- Party: Democratic
- Education: Emmanuel College (BA); Western Michigan University (MA); University of Washington (PhD)
- Occupation: Teacher

Teresa M. Bergeson (born October 5, 1942) is a former three-term Washington State Superintendent of Public Instruction.

== Biography ==
Dr. Bergeson graduated from Emmanuel College in 1964 with a B.A. in English. In 1969, she earned a master's degree in counseling and guidance from Western Michigan University. She earned her doctoral degree from the University of Washington.

Bergeson worked as a counselor at Lincoln High School in Tacoma, Washington, and as a teacher and guidance counselor in Massachusetts and Alaska. During this period Bergeson served as chair of the National Education Association's Women's Caucus and implemented their National Women's Leadership Training Project. In 1981 Bergeson was elected vice-president of the Washington Education Association, and in 1985 she was elected president.

In 1989, she was hired as an executive director in the Central Kitsap School District where she had a supervisory role over 9 of the 21 schools in the district. From 1993 to 1996, Bergeson was the executive director of the Washington State Commission on Student Learning, in which capacity she led the development of statewide standards for students, as well as the Washington Assessment of Student Learning.

In 1996, Bergeson launched her first successful bid for the non-partisan office of Washington State Superintendent of Public Instruction. She was re-elected in 2000 and 2004. As superintendent Bergeson led further development of statewide standards and standardized tests, particularly after the Commission on Student Learning was dissolved in 1999.

In 2008, Bergeson was defeated in her run for a fourth term as Superintendent of Public Instruction by challenger Randy Dorn.

== See also ==
- Washington Assessment of Student Learning
