= Rubric (academic) =

Scoring guide for assessment

In the realm of education, a rubric is a "scoring guide used to evaluate the quality of students' constructed responses". In simpler terms, it serves as a set of criteria for grading assignments. Typically presented in table format, rubrics contain evaluative criteria, quality definitions for various levels of achievement, and a scoring strategy. They play a dual role for teachers in marking assignments and for students in planning their work.

== Components of a scoring rubric ==
A scoring rubric typically includes dimensions or "criteria" on which performance is rated, definitions and examples illustrating measured attributes, and a rating scale for each dimension. Joan Herman, Aschbacher, and Winters identify these elements in scoring rubrics:

- Traits or dimensions serving as the basis for judging the student response
- Definitions and examples clarifying each trait or dimension
- A scale of values for rating each dimension
- Standards of excellence for specified performance levels with models or examples

== Types ==
Rubrics can be classified as holistic, analytic, or developmental. Holistic rubrics provide an overall rating for a piece of work, considering all aspects. Analytic rubrics evaluate various dimensions or components separately. Developmental rubrics, a subset of analytical rubrics, facilitate assessment, instructional design, and transformative learning through multiple dimensions of developmental successions.

== Steps to create a scoring rubric ==
To create an effective scoring rubric, a five-step method is often employed:

1. Model Review: Provide students with sample assignments of varying quality for analysis.
2. Criteria Listing: Collaboratively list criteria for the scoring rubric, incorporating student feedback.
3. Quality Gradations: Define hierarchical categories describing levels of quality or development.
4. Practice on Models: Allow students to apply rubrics to sample assignments for a deeper understanding.
5. Self and Peer Assessment: Introduce self and peer-assessment to reinforce learning.

== When to use scoring rubrics ==
Scoring rubrics find application in individual assessments, projects, and capstone projects. They prove particularly beneficial when multiple evaluators are assessing to maintain focus on contributing attributes. Rubrics are ideal for project assessments, providing criteria for various components.

== Developmental rubrics ==
Developmental rubrics, a subtype of analytic rubrics, utilize multiple dimensions of developmental successions for assessment, instructional design, and transformative learning. They define modes of practice within a community of experts and indicate transformative learning through dynamic succession.

=== Defining developmental rubrics ===
Developmental rubrics refer to a matrix of modes of practice. Practices belong to a community of experts. Each mode of practice competes with a few others within the same dimension. Modes appear in succession because their frequency is determined by four parameters: endemicity, performance rate, commitment strength, and acceptance. Transformative learning results in changing from one mode to the next. The typical developmental modes can be roughly identified as beginning, exploring, sustaining, and inspiring. The timing of the four levels is unique to each dimension and it is common to find beginning or exploring modes in one dimension coexisting with sustaining or inspiring modes in another. Often, the modes within a dimension are given unique names in addition to the typical identifier. As a result, developmental rubrics have four properties:

1. They are descriptions of examples of behaviors.
2. They contain multiple dimensions each consisting of a few modes of practice that cannot be used simultaneously with other modes in the dimension.
3. The modes of practice within a dimension show a dynamic succession of levels.
4. They can be created for extremely diverse scales of times & places.

=== Creating developmental rubrics ===
1. Since practices belong to a community, the first step is to locate a group of practitioners, who are expert in their field and experienced with learners.
2. Next, each practitioner works with an expert developmental interviewer to create a matrix that best reflects their experiences. Once several interviews have been completed they can be combined within a single set of developmental rubrics for the community through individual or computerized text analysis.
3. Third, the community of experts rate learner performances and meet to compare ratings of the same performances and revise the definitions when multiple interpretations are discovered.
4. Fourth, instructors of particular courses share the developmental rubrics with students and identify the target modes of practice for the course. Typically, a course targets only a fraction of the dimensions of the community's developmental rubrics and only one mode of practice within each of the target dimensions.
5. Finally, the rubrics are used real-time to motivate student development, usually focusing on one dimension at a time and discussing the opportunities to perform at the next mode of practice in succession.

== Etymology and history ==
The term "rubric" traditionally referred to instructions on a test or a heading on a document. In modern education, it has evolved to denote an assessment tool linked to learning objectives. The transition from medicine to education occurred through the construction of "Standardized Developmental Ratings" in the mid-1970s, later adapted for writing assessment.

=== Technical aspects ===
Scoring rubrics enhance scoring consistency, providing educators with a reliable grading tool. Grading is more consistent when using a rubric, reducing variation between students and different teachers.

== See also ==
- Authentic assessment – Measurement of intellectual accomplishments
- Concept inventory – Knowledge assessment tool
- Educational assessment – Educational evaluation method
- Educational technology – Use of technology in education to enhance learning and teaching
- Standards-based assessment – Assessment based on specified standards
- Technology integration – Use of technology to aid education
