= James McIntire (author) =

James McIntire was a gunfighter and Texas Ranger in the old west of the United States. He is best known for his autobiography, written in 1902 following a near death experience.

The biography, Early Days in Texas: A Trip Through Hell and Heaven was published in 1902. This followed an experience in which McIntire reports having died and gone to Heaven where he had a long conversation with Christ, was given a drink of water before he was returned to his body for several years.

McIntire used this last part of his life to write his story which recounts his various careers as a Ranger, a buffalo hunter, an Indian fighter, a cowboy, a sheepherder, a saloon keeper, a deputy sheriff, and a wanted outlaw. His story is notable for its unapologetic inclusion of the lurid details of his life. He reports seeing a companion killed and eaten by Comanche warriors, and brags about making a purse from the breast of a Comanche woman.

Jim McIntire was a friend of the better known "Longhair" Jim Courtright and the two were charged with murder after they killed two French squatters on some ranch land in New Mexico.

The most infamous story about McIntire was from his time as a deputy sheriff in Mobeetie, Texas. According to his book, Wyatt Earp and Mysterious Dave Mather had come to town with phony gold bricks which they were selling to the naive citizens. Jim exposed the scam and ran the two famous gunfighters out of town.
