= Washington Assessment of Student Learning =

Standardized test in Washington, United States

The Washington Assessment of Student Learning (WASL) was a standardized educational assessment system given as the primary assessment in the state of Washington from spring 1997 to summer 2009. The WASL was also used as a high school graduation examination beginning in the spring of 2006 and ending in 2009. It has been replaced by the High School Proficiency Exam (HSPE), the Measurements of Students Progress (MSP) for grades 3–8, and later the Smarter Balanced Assessment (SBAC). The WASL assessment consisted of examinations over four subjects (reading, mathematics, science, and writing) with four different types of questions (multiple-choice, short-answer, essay, and problem solving). It was given to students from third through eighth grades and tenth grade. Third and sixth graders were tested in reading and math; fourth and seventh graders in math, reading and writing. Fifth and eighth graders were tested in reading, math and science. The high school assessment, given during a student's tenth grade year, contained all four subjects.

== History ==
In 1993, the state legislature created the Commission on Student Learning and charged in funding.

== Controversy ==
Many parent and teacher groups have protested against the WASL, claiming unreasonable expectations while also disputing the requirement that students with severe learning disabilities must take the test. During the Washington State PTA's 2006 convention the delegates unanimously voted to "oppose any efforts to use a single indicator for making decisions about individual student opportunities such as grade promotion, high school graduation, or entrance into specific educational programs." Instead of a single measure, such as the WASL, Washington State PTA supports multiple measures of student achievement.

Some WASL examinations (including the writing examinations) are graded by human scorers, and the qualifications of these scorers have sometimes been points of contention. WASL examinations were developed and originally graded by practicing teachers, but current test scorers are only required to have a bachelor's degree and minimal test-grading training. The Washington Office of Superintendent of Public Instruction (OSPI) is currently only supporting the involvement of Washington educators in the scoring of the Writing section of the WASL. OSPI will no longer be supporting teachers in the scoring of Reading, Math and Science. Additionally, inconsistency in human scorers’ evaluations of answers has undermined the legitimacy of some WASL examinations’ results. The belief that human-generated scores may be inconsistent is further perpetuated by the fact that they (the scorers) are only expected to reach a little more than fifty-five percent agreement on a given score.

Due to the inconsistencies in scoring, educators warn that the WASL examinations are not appropriate for determining grade advancement and high school graduation. Despite these warnings, recent legislation in Washington State has designated the WASL examinations for these purposes.

Due to the wide variation in strand performance schools are unable to use WASL results to identify specific content areas needing improvement.

=== 2006 results ===
About half of tenth graders did not pass the math section of the 2005-2006 WASL. Scores also fell across the board in other grades, leading some to question whether there was a problem with the scoring since this change appeared in many unrelated schools and districts. The president of the Washington Education Association teachers' union pointed to the very high failure rate as being unacceptable, and a reason to drop the WASL requirement for graduation. Superintendent Terry Bergeson responded by saying "It would be a mistake to turn back on the commitment to graduate all students at a high standard."

A September 2006 investigation by the Snohomish County Journal found that the WASL was based on work by Robert Carkhuff, a self-published Washington OSPI contractor. He has had a decades-long professional relationship with key OSPI staff members Terry Bergeson and Shirley McCune. Documents show he was paid more than $1 million to restructure Washington state education around his thinking systems. The investigation concluded that the WASL was designed improperly and that flaws within the test were responsible for the high rate of student failure. Among the problematic components of the test were the structure, phrasing, and content of its math and writing sections. These sections were not designed with a complete understanding of the intellectual abilities and knowledge levels of students. The investigation concluded that the best method to ensure the fulfillment of Terry Bergeson's pledge that all students have the opportunity to earn a diploma was to correct the flaws within the WASL.

=== High minority failure rates ===
Compared to the half of most students, nearly three-quarters of the state's African American and Latino students who took the 10th-grade WASL failed at least one of the subjects needed to graduate. Two-thirds of Native Americans were not on track to earning a diploma, and 70% of students living in poverty, mostly white and Asian. Although research has shown an achievement gap has always existed between most groups on all standardized tests, state Superintendent Terry Bergeson told the Seattle Times the state "must ensure success of all students," as it is the core belief of standards-based education reform. Bergeson's goal is to make Washington the first state to eliminate the achievement gap found between ethnic and income groups.

=== Math cancelled, science section delay ===
On May 8, 2007, Governor Gregoire signed and officially called the delay of the math and science sections of the WASL test. Students in the Class of 2008 would still have to only pass the reading and writing sections. On March 26, 2008, Gregoire effectively dismissed the math section of the 10th-grade WASL, largely due to low pass rates and debate over its long list of problems, to be replaced by math tests at the end of classes.

The math WASL would count as a graduation requirement in 2011 before being replaced in 2014 by end-of-course exams. The math end-of-course exams would be administered after Algebra and Geometry, and would be taken at the completion of the course. This meant that some students may have achieved their math graduation requirements prior to even entering high school, which may have helped ease the stress of taking the WASL for the remaining subjects during their 9th or 10th grade year. However, the WASL was ultimately discontinued. Starting in 2010, students no longer had to take the WASL.

== Washington Classroom-Based Performance Assessment (WCBPA) ==
In order to address concerns that only math, science, reading and writing will be assessed, classroom based assessments in many fields have been created and piloted by actual students through an OSPI project focused on student voice and authentic assessment.

=== Arts ===
In music, 5th graders are asked to sight sing from sheet music. They may use solfege, scale numbers, or fingering without an instrument. Songs must be sung with a steady beat, correct pitch and correct rhythmic value. A 0-point response will result with six or more rhythmic errors or not maintaining a steady beat. Each student will have one minute to study and practice the sight-singing exercise. Then there will be two opportunities to perform while being videotaped. They are also expected to compose on demand a theme using blank staff paper, and perform it on an instrument.

In dance, the state expects that all 5th graders can interpret a piece of visual art by creating and performing an original dance. A jumping jack "X" must be fully extended, a wilted "X" is not acceptable. Ending in a shape must be held for 3 seconds. Dances must perform in bare feet or appropriate dancing shoes. The student has 20 minutes to create and rehearse their dance, and must describe two ideas, images, or feelings and explain why the movement or movement phrase was chosen.

Fifth graders are also required that they assess their social studies achievements. The students break into five different groups such as tobacco growers and producers. This year's prompt was: Should Representative Smith vote for a bill that does not allow smoking in public places. The different groups try to persuade Smith to go their way. Smith then votes and the group work is completed. In the end, they write up a four or five paragraph persuasive essay whether they like the vote choice. At that point they do not qualify under the groups and it is their own opinion.

Other arts assessments include theatre and visual arts.
