= Randy Dorn =

14th Washington Superintendent of Public Instruction

14th Washington Superintendent of Public Instruction
- In office January 14, 2009 – January 11, 2017
- Governor: Christine Gregoire; Jay Inslee
- Preceded by: Terry Bergeson
- Succeeded by: Chris Reykdal

Member of the Washington House of Representatives from the 2nd district
- In office December 18, 1987 – January 9, 1995
- Preceded by: Ken Madsen
- Succeeded by: Scott Smith

Personal details
- Born: September 10, 1953 (age 72) Puyallup, Washington, U.S.
- Party: Democratic
- Spouse: Kaye Dorn
- Children: 3
- Education: University of Idaho (BA); Pacific Lutheran University (MA)
- Occupation: Teacher

Randolph I. Dorn (born September 10, 1953) is an American educator and politician who served as the 14th Washington State Superintendent of Public Instruction from 2009 to 2017. A member of the Democratic Party, he previously served as a member of the Washington House of Representatives, representing the 2nd district from 1987 to 1995.

Political offices
Preceded by Terry Bergeson	Washington Superintendent of Public Instruction; 2009–2017	Succeeded by Chris Reykdal
