= Washington State Office of Superintendent of Public Instruction =

State education agency for the U.S. state of Washington

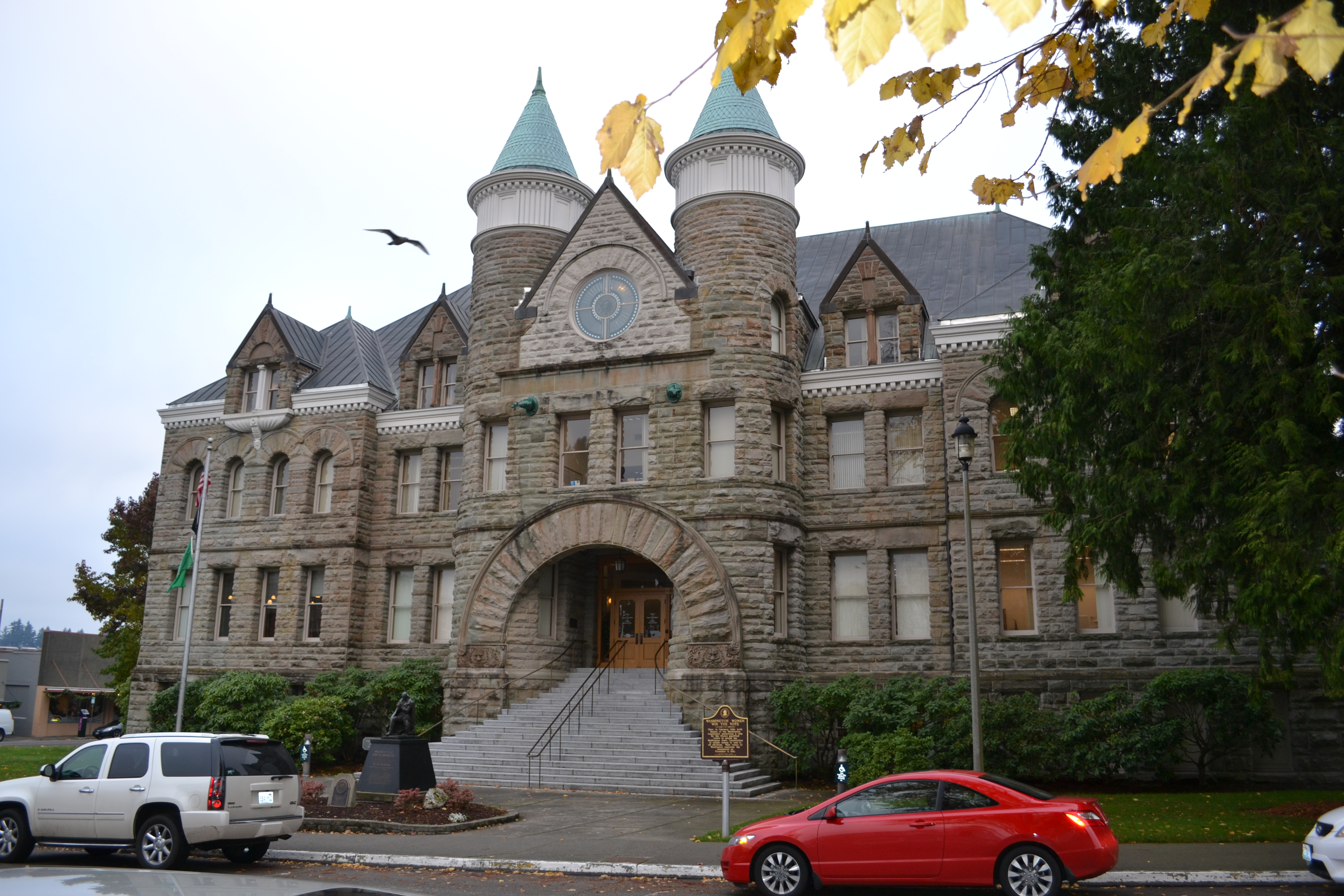
- OSPI Headquarters, December 2011

Agency overview
- Headquarters: 600 Washington Street SE, Olympia, Washington; 47°2′34.51″N 122°53′58.4″W
- Employees: 420 (2024)
- Annual budget: approx. $33 billion (2024)
- Agency executive: Chris Reykdal
- Website: ospi.k12.wa.us

The Washington State Office of Superintendent of Public Instruction, or OSPI, is the state education agency for the State of Washington. The agency is bound by the Washington State Legislature to implement state laws regarding education, including the 1993 education reform act which mandated the controversial WASL standards based assessment. The Superintendent of Public Instruction is sixth (behind the Lieutenant Governor, Secretary of State, Treasurer, Auditor, and Attorney General, respectively) in the line of succession to the office of Governor of Washington.

Like all members of executive branch, the Superintendent of Public Instruction was established as a partisan position by the Washington State Constitution in 1889. However, an initiative to the people in 1938 made the position nonpartisan. Initiative 126 passed 293,202 to 153,142 and is codified as Chapter 1 Laws of 1939. Pearl Wanamaker became the first nonpartisan superintendent when she was elected in November 1940.

The agency is headquartered in the Old Capitol Building in Olympia.

== Superintendent of Public Instruction ==
The Superintendent of Public Instruction is paid an annual salary of $171,765.

The current Superintendent is Chris Reykdal; past Superintendents include:

Name	Years
Rev. B.C. Lippincott	1861
Dr. Nelson Rounds	1872-1874
John P. Judson	1874-1880
Jonathan S. Houghton	1880-1882
Charles W. Wheeler	1882-1884
R.C. Kerr	1884-1886
J.C. Lawrence	1886-1888
J.H. Morgan	1888-1889
Robert Bruce Bryan	1889-1893; 1901-1908
Charles W. Bean	1893-1897
Frank J. Browne	1897-1901
Henry B. Dewey	1908-1913
Josephine Corliss Preston	1913–1929
Noah D. Showalter	1929-1937
Stanley F. Atwood	1937-1940
Pearl Anderson Wanamaker	1941–1956
Lloyd J. Andrews	1956–1960
Louis "Louie" Bruno	1960–1972
Frank (Buster) Brouillet	1973–1989
Judith Billings	1990–1996
Teresa "Terry" Bergeson	1997–2008
Randy Dorn	2009–2016
Chris Reykdal	2017 – present
