= Open primaries in the United States =

Type of state election

An open primary is a primary election that does not require voters to be affiliated with a political party in order to vote for partisan candidates. In a traditional open primary, voters may select one party's ballot and vote for that party's nomination. As in a closed primary (such that only those affiliated with a political party may vote), the highest voted candidate in each party then proceeds to the general election. In a nonpartisan blanket primary, all candidates appear on the same ballot and the two highest voted candidates proceed to the runoff election, regardless of party affiliation. The constitutionality of this system was affirmed by the Supreme Court of the United States in Washington State Grange v. Washington State Republican Party in 2008, whereas a partisan blanket primary was previously ruled to be unconstitutional in 2000. The arguments for open primaries are that voters can make independent choices, building consensus that the electoral process is not splintered or undermined by the presence of multiple political parties.

== Voter participation ==
The open primary could be seen as good for voter participation. First, the open primary allows nonpartisan or independent voters to participate in the nominating process. If these voters are allowed to help select the nominees then they may be more likely to vote in the general election, since one of the candidates could be someone the non-partisan voter voted for. Also, moderate members of one party may agree more with a candidate for the nomination of another party. These voters may have more of an incentive to participate in the general election.

It has also been claimed that the open primary is bad for voter participation. In Hawaii, primary voter turnout fell from 74.6% in 1978 to 42.2% in 2006 after changing to open primaries, although this could be the result of various other factors—not just the move towards the open primary system. The closed primary system had more of an incentive for people to join one of the major parties, which possibly led to people being more involved in the voting process. With the open primary, some argue, more voters become independent and are less likely to participate in the nominating or election processes.

== Manipulation and dilution ==
Opponents of the open primary believe that the open primary leaves the party nominations vulnerable to manipulation and dilution. First, one party could organize its voters to vote in the other party's primary and choose the candidate that they most agree with or that they think their party could most easily defeat. Secondly, in the open primary, independent voters can vote in either party. This occurrence may dilute the vote of a particular party and lead to a nominee who does not represent the party's views. There is, however, little evidence of manipulation actually occurring, but there have been occasions when independent voters have an effect on the outcome of a partisan primary.

For example, in the 2008 presidential primaries in New Hampshire, Mitt Romney won among registered Republicans, but John McCain won overall. Likewise, in South Carolina, Mike Huckabee won among self-identified Republicans, but John McCain won the state.

== Constitutional issues ==
Opponents of the open primary argue that the open primary is unconstitutional. These opponents believe that the open primary law violates their freedom of association, because it forces them to allow outsiders to select their candidates. An opposing view is that political parties are not mentioned in the U.S. Constitution in any language, but voting rights of the individual are clearly defined.

Freedom of association has been recognized by the United States Supreme Court. First, in NAACP v. Alabama, the court said that "It is beyond debate that freedom to engage in association for the advancement of beliefs and ideas is an inseparable aspect of the "liberty" assured by the Due Process Clause of the Fifth and Fourteenth Amendment, which embraces freedom of speech."

In other words, the freedom of association is part of the freedom of speech. The freedom of speech, which is found in the First Amendment to the United States Constitution, is applied to the states through the fourteenth amendment. In Gitlow v. New York, Justice Sanford states that "[f]or present purposes we may and do assume that freedom of speech and of the press-which are protected by the First Amendment from abridgment by Congress-are among the fundamental personal rights and 'liberties' protected by the due process clause of the Fourteenth Amendment from impairment by the States."

This constitutionality raises a problem. The most popular alternative to the open primary is the closed primary. However, a mandatory closed primary can also be unconstitutional. In Tashjian v. Republican Party of Connecticut, the United States Supreme Court determined that Connecticut's closed primary law was unconstitutional. The Connecticut closed primary law "[required] voters in any political party primary to be registered members of that party". The Republican Party of Connecticut, however, wanted to allow independents to vote in the Republican primary if they so chose. The problem with this closed primary law was that it prevented the Republican Party from allowing independent "registered voters not affiliated with any party to vote in Republican primaries for federal and statewide offices". Since the Republican Party of Connecticut was not able to choose who it wanted to vote in the primary, the United States Supreme Court, in a 5–4 decision, stated that the closed primary law in Connecticut "impermissibly burdens the right of the Party and its members protected by the First and Fourteenth Amendments".

On October 1, 2007, the U.S. Court of Appeals for the Fourth Circuit ruled that the Virginia mandatory open primary statute was unconstitutional as applied to the Republicans because it imposed a burden on their freedom to associate under the First Amendment, although it did not explicitly rule on the question of whether an open primary law was in general unconstitutional as a burden on association.

== California and primary election alternatives ==
A "modified closed primary" was in effect in California from 2001 to 2011. Each political party could decide whether or not they wish to allow unaffiliated voters to vote in their party's primary. This appeared to avoid the constitutional concerns of both the open and the closed primary. In the 2004 and 2006 primary elections, the Republican, Democratic, and American Independent parties all opted to allow unaffiliated voters to request their party's ballot. However, since the 2008 presidential primary election, only the Democratic and American Independent parties have taken this option, while the Republican party has not.

In 2011, the state adopted a "modified open primary". Individual citizens may vote for any candidate, and the top two candidates regardless of party will advance to the general election. The presidential election is exempt from this voting method as it is a contest for delegates rather than a direct election for an office.

A potential side effect of the open primary is that parties that run more candidates may find themselves at a disadvantage, since their partisan supporters' votes will be split more ways in the primary and thus those candidates may have a harder time reaching the top-two ranking when competing with parties that run fewer candidates.

== Primary types by state ==
State rules Open primary Voting in a different primary may be regarded as a form of registration with that party Unaffiliated voters allowed to participate in any primary they choose Parties choose who they want voting in their primary Closed primary Multi-party, nonpartisan, or jungle primaries

2024 Republican Party presidential primaries, rules Open primary Semi-closed primary Closed primary Canceled

2024 Democratic Party presidential primaries, rules Open primary Semi-closed primary Closed primary Canceled

=== Open Primaries ===
Voters may choose to vote in one party's primary election, regardless of their partisan registration.

- Alabama
- Arkansas
- Georgia
- Hawaii
- Illinois
- Indiana
- Iowa
- Michigan
- Minnesota
- Mississippi
- Missouri
- Montana
- North Dakota
- Ohio
- South Carolina
- Tennessee
- Texas
- Vermont
- Virginia
- Wisconsin

=== Semi-Closed Primaries ===
Voters registered with a political party may only vote in that party's primary election. However, unaffiliated voters may vote in either.

- Arizona
- Colorado
- Maine
- Massachusetts
- New Hampshire
- New Mexico
- North Carolina
- Rhode Island

=== Closed Primaries ===
Voters can only vote in the primary election of the party they are registered as. States may or may not allow unaffiliated voters to vote in a primary election. If unaffiliated voters are allowed to vote, it is subject to the political parties' decision in each election cycle.

- Connecticut (allows unaffiliated voters)
- Delaware
- Florida
- Idaho (allows unaffiliated voters)
- Kansas (allows unaffiliated voters)
- Kentucky
- Maryland (allows unaffiliated voters)
- Nebraska
- Nevada
- New Jersey
- New York
- Oklahoma (allows unaffiliated voters)
- Oregon (allows unaffiliated voters)
- Pennsylvania
- South Dakota (allows unaffiliated voters)
- Utah (allows unaffiliated voters)
- Washington, D.C.
- West Virginia (allows unaffiliated voters)
- Wyoming

=== Top-two primaries ===
Washington had a blanket primary system that allowed every voter to choose a candidate of any party for each position. That kind of system was ruled unconstitutional by the US Supreme Court in California Democratic Party v. Jones (2000) because it forced political parties to endorse candidates against their will. The Washington State Legislature passed a new primary system in 2004, which would have created a top-two nonpartisan blanket primary system. It provided an open primary as a backup, giving the Governor the option to choose. Although Secretary of State Sam Reed advocated the blanket, non-partisan system, on April 1, 2004, the Governor used the line-item veto to activate the Open primary instead. In response, Washington's Initiative 872 was filed on January 8, 2004, by Terry Hunt from the Washington Grange, which proposed to create a nonpartisan blanket primary in that state. The measure passed with 59.8% of the vote (1,632,225 yes votes and 1,095,190 no votes) in 2004. On March 18, 2008, the US Supreme Court ruled, in Washington State Grange v. Washington State Republican Party, that Washington's Initiative 872 was constitutionally permissible. Unlike the earlier blanket primary, it officially disregards party affiliation while allowing candidates to state their party preference.

Washington state implemented this Top 2 primary, starting in the 2008 election which applies to federal, state, and local elections, but not to presidential elections. There is no voter party registration in Washington, and candidates are not restricted to stating an affiliation with an established major or minor party. The candidate has up to 16 characters to describe on the ballot the party that they prefer. Some candidates state a preference for an established major party, such as the Democratic Party or the Republican Party, while others use the ballot to send a message, such as Prefers No New Taxes Party or Prefers Salmon Yoga Party. Since this is a "preference" and not a declaration of party membership, candidates can assert party affiliation without the party's approval or use alternate terms for a given party. Gubernatorial candidate Dino Rossi's 2008 stated preference was for the "GOP Party", although he is a prominent Republican.

In California, under Proposition 14, traditional party primaries were replaced in 2011 with a jungle primary election. Proposition 14, known as the open primary measure, gave every voter the same ballot in primary elections for most state and federal races. The top two candidates advance to the November general election. That does not affect the presidential primary, local offices, or non-partisan offices such as judges and the Superintendent of Public Instruction.

In the 2020 Alaska elections, voters approved Measure 2, which replaced party primaries with a single non-partisan jungle primary. The top 4 candidates will advance to a general election that uses ranked-choice voting. It is used for all state and federal elections except for the president.

Louisiana primary is the common term for top-two runoff voting system where all candidates for the same office appear together on the ballot in the general election, and if none win a simple majority, a runoff or second round election for the two top candidates is held a short time later to determine the winner. The system is used in the Louisiana general election for local, state, and congressional offices. Though strictly speaking it occurs during the general election and so it is not a primary election, the general election serves as a primary if no candidate in the race wins a majority. On election day, all candidates for the same office appear together on the ballot, often including several candidates from each major party. If no candidate wins a simple majority in the first round, there is a runoff one month later between the top two candidates to determine the winner.
