= 2010 Washington State Senate election =

Washington State Senate elections, 2010
- November 2, 2010

25 seats of the Washington State Senate 25 seats needed for a majority
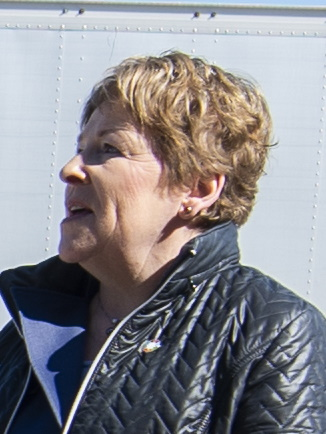

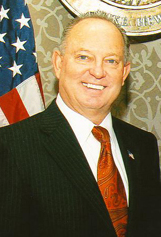
	Majority party	Minority party
Leader	Lisa Brown	Mike Hewitt
Party	Democratic	Republican
Leader's seat	3rd-Spokane	16th-Walla Walla
Last election	31	18
Seats won	27	22
Seat change	▼4	▲4
- Results: Republican gain Democratic hold Republican hold No election
Majority Leader before election
Lisa Brown
Democratic
Elected Majority Leader
Lisa Brown
Democratic

The Washington State Senate elections were held on November 2, 2010, in which about half of the state's 49 legislative districts choose a state senator for a four-year term to the Washington State Senate. The other half of state senators are chosen in the next biennial election, so that about half of the senators, along with all the members of the Washington State House of Representatives, are elected every two years.

24 seats were regularly scheduled to be up this cycle, along with 1 additional seat holding a special election to fill an unexpired term: the 28th district, held by appointed Senator Steve Litzow, whose former incumbent Fred Jarrett vacated the seat.

== Summary of results ==
- Districts not listed were not up for election in 2020.

State Senate District	Incumbent	Party	Elected Senator	Party
6th	Chris Marr	Dem	Michael Baumgartner	Rep
7th	Bob Morton	Rep	Bob Morton	Rep
8th	Jerome Delvin	Rep	Jerome Delvin	Rep
13th	Janéa Holmquist Newbry	Rep	Janéa Holmquist Newbry	Rep
15th	Jim Honeyford	Rep	Jim Honeyford	Rep
21st	Paull Shin	Dem	Paull Shin	Dem
26th	Derek Kilmer	Dem	Derek Kilmer	Dem
29th	Rosa Franklin	Dem	Steve Conway	Dem
30th	Tracey Eide	Dem	Tracey Eide	Dem
31st	Pam Roach	Rep	Pam Roach	Rep
32nd	Darlene Fairley	Dem	Maralyn Chase	Dem
33rd	Karen Keiser	Dem	Karen Keiser	Dem
34th	Joe McDermott	Dem	Sharon K. Nelson	Dem
35th	Tim Sheldon	Dem	Tim Sheldon	Dem
36th	Jeanne Kohl-Welles	Dem	Jeanne Kohl-Welles	Dem
37th	Adam Kline	Dem	Adam Kline	Dem
38th	Jean Berkey	Dem	Nick Harper	Dem
41st	Randy Gordon	Dem	Steve Litzow	Rep
42nd	Dale Brandland	Rep	Doug Ericksen	Rep
43rd	Ed Murray	Dem	Ed Murray	Dem
44th	Steve Hobbs	Dem	Steve Hobbs	Dem
45th	Eric Oemig	Dem	Andy Hill	Rep
46th	Ken Jacobson	Dem	Scott White	Dem
47th	Claudia Kauffman	Dem	Joe Fain	Rep
48th	Rodney Tom	Dem	Rodney Tom	Dem

== Predictions ==
Source	Ranking	As of
Governing	Lean D	November 1, 2010

== Detailed results ==
- Note: Washington uses a top two primary system. Official primary results can be obtained here and official general election results here.

=== District 6 ===
Washington's 6th legislative district State Senate Election, 2010
Primary election
Party	Candidate	Votes	%
Republican	Michael Baumgartner	21,263	53.3%
Democratic	Chris Marr (incumbent)	18,630	46.7%
Total votes		39,893	100%
General election
Republican	Michael Baumgartner	33,929	53.71%
Democratic	Chris Marr (incumbent)	29,237	46.29%
Total votes		63,166	100%
Republican gain from Democratic			

=== Endorsements ===
Michael Baumgartner (R)

U.S. Representatives

- Cathy McMorris Rodgers, U.S. Representative for Washington's 5th Congressional District

State legislators

- Mark Schoesler, Senate Minority Leader

Local officials

- David Condon, Chief of Staff for Cathy McMorris Rodgers and future Spokane Mayor

Political parties

- Spokane County Republican Party

Newspapers

- The Spokesman-Review

=== District 7 ===
Washington's 7th legislative district State Senate Election, 2010
Primary election
Party	Candidate	Votes	%
Republican	Bob Morton (incumbent)	26,071	74.97%
Democratic	Barbara Mowrey	8,704	25.03%
Total votes		34,775	100%
General election
Republican	Bob Morton (incumbent)	39,694	74.82%
Democratic	Barbara Mowrey	13,359	25.18%
Total votes		53,053	100%
Republican hold			

=== District 8 ===
Washington's 8th legislative district State Senate Election, 2010
Primary election
Party	Candidate	Votes	%
Republican	Jerome Delvin (incumbent)	19,018	68.17%
Republican	Brad Anderson	8,878	31.83%
Total votes		27,896	100%
General election
Republican	Jerome Delvin (incumbent)	31,083	63.92%
Republican	Brad Anderson	17,546	36.08%
Total votes		48,629	100%
Republican hold			

=== District 13 ===
Washington's 13th legislative district State Senate Election, 2010
Primary election
Party	Candidate	Votes	%
Republican	Janéa Holmquist Newbry (incumbent)	21,885	100%
Total votes		21,885	100%
General election
Republican	Janéa Holmquist Newbry (incumbent)	35,432	100%
Total votes		35,432	100%
Republican hold			

=== District 15 ===
Washington's 15th legislative district State Senate Election, 2010
Primary election
Party	Candidate	Votes	%
Republican	Jim Honeyford (incumbent)	15,358	100%
Total votes		15,358	100%
General election
Republican	Jim Honeyford (incumbent)	25,864	100%
Total votes		25,864	100%
Republican hold			

=== District 21 ===
Washington's 21st legislative district State Senate Election, 2010
Primary election
Party	Candidate	Votes	%
Democratic	Paull Shin (incumbent)	16,492	62.34%
Republican	David Preston	6,301	23.82%
Republican	Glen Sayes	3,663	13.85%
Total votes		26,456	100%
General election
Democratic	Paull Shin (incumbent)	30,369	63.26%
Republican	David Preston	17,637	36.74%
Total votes		48,006	100%
Democratic hold			

=== District 26 ===
Washington's 26th legislative district State Senate Election, 2010
Primary election
Party	Candidate	Votes	%
Democratic	Derek Kilmer (incumbent)	18,949	55.92%
Republican	Marty McClendon	12,696	37.47%
Independent	Kristine Danielson	2,238	6.61%
Total votes		33,883	100%
General election
Democratic	Derek Kilmer (incumbent)	33,090	58.81%
Republican	Marty McClendon	23,179	41.19%
Total votes		56,269	100%
Democratic hold			

=== District 29 ===
Washington's 29th legislative district State Senate Election, 2010
Primary election
Party	Candidate	Votes	%
Democratic	Steve Conway	7,550	56.94%
Republican	Terry Harder	3,901	29.42%
Independent	Ken Paulson	1,808	13.64%
Total votes		13,259	100%
General election
Democratic	Steve Conway	16,987	63.38%
Republican	Terry Harder	9,813	36.62%
Total votes		26,800	100%
Democratic hold			

=== District 30 ===
Washington's 30th legislative district State Senate Election, 2010
Primary election
Party	Candidate	Votes	%
Democratic	Tracey Eide (incumbent)	11,045	50.84%
Republican	Tony Moore	10,682	49.16%
Total votes		21,727	100%
General election
Democratic	Tracey Eide (incumbent)	20,218	52.13%
Republican	Tony Moore	18,565	47.87%
Total votes		38,783	100%
Democratic hold			

=== District 31 ===
Washington's 31st legislative district State Senate Election, 2010
Primary election
Party	Candidate	Votes	%
Republican	Pam Roach (incumbent)	10,406	40.9%
Republican	Matt Richardson	5,798	22.79%
Democratic	Ron WeigeIt	5,043	19.82%
Republican	Raymond Bunk	4,193	16.48%
Total votes		15,440	100%
General election
Republican	Pam Roach (incumbent)	29,374	66.71%
Republican	Matt Richardson	14,661	33.29%
Total votes		44,035	100%
Republican hold			

=== District 32 ===
Washington's 32nd legislative district State Senate Election, 2010
Primary election
Party	Candidate	Votes	%
Democratic	Maralyn Chase	14,928	47.66%
Republican	David Baker	12,478	39.84%
Democratic	Patty Butler	3,915	12.5%
Total votes		31,321	100%
General election
Democratic	Maralyn Chase	33,426	60.55%
Republican	David Baker	21,775	39.45%
Total votes		55,201	100%
Democratic hold			

=== District 33 ===
Washington's 33rd legislative district State Senate Election, 2010
Primary election
Party	Candidate	Votes	%
Democratic	Karen Keiser (incumbent)	11,107	57.77%
Republican	Jack Michalek	8,120	42.23%
Total votes		19,227	100%
General election
Democratic	Karen Keiser (incumbent)	20,559	59.78%
Republican	Jack Michalek	13,833	40.22%
Total votes		34,392	100%
Democratic hold			

=== District 34 ===
Washington's 34th legislative district State Senate Election, 2010
Primary election
Party	Candidate	Votes	%
Democratic	Sharon K. Nelson	20,530	100%
Total votes		20,530	100%
General election
Democratic	Sharon K. Nelson	37,309	100%
Total votes		37,309	100%
Democratic hold			

=== District 35 ===
Washington's 35th legislative district State Senate Election, 2010
Primary election
Party	Candidate	Votes	%
Democratic	Tim Sheldon (incumbent)	20,437	61.17%
Republican	Nancy (grandma) Williams (Note: This is the candidates full name as was registered with the State of Washington.)	12,974	38.83%
Total votes		33,411	100%
General election
Democratic	Time Sheldon (incumbent)	34,130	61.81%
Republican	Nancy (grandma) Williams	21,084	38.19%
Total votes		55,214	100%
Democratic hold			

=== District 36 ===
Washington's 36th legislative district State Senate Election, 2010
Primary election
Party	Candidate	Votes	%
Democratic	Jeanne Kohl-Welles (incumbent)	26,906	83.67%
Republican	Leslie Klein (Note: Listed on the ballot as "(R) Problemfixer Party")	5,253	16.33%
Total votes		32,159	100%
General election
Democratic	Jeanne Kohl-Welles (incumbent)	51,656	83.93%
Republican	Leslie Klein	9,889	16.07%
Total votes		61,545	100%
Democratic hold			

=== District 37 ===
Washington's 37th legislative district State Senate Election, 2010
Primary election
Party	Candidate	Votes	%
Democratic	Adam Kline	17,706	88.67%
Independent	Tamra Smilanich	2,263	11.33%
Total votes		19,969	100%
General election
Democratic	Adam Kline (incumbent)	34,995	87.94%
Independent	Tamra Smilanich	4,767	12.06%
Total votes		39,792	100%
Democratic hold			

=== District 38 ===
Washington's 38th legislative district State Senate Election, 2010
Primary election
Party	Candidate	Votes	%
Democratic	Nick Harper	7,193	35.09%
Conservative	Rod Rieger	6,713	32.75%
Democratic	Jean Berkey (incumbent)	6,591	32.16%
Total votes		20,497	100%
General election
Democratic	Nick Harper	22,089	59.73%
Conservative	Rod Rieger	14,892	40.27%
Total votes		36,981	100%
Democratic hold			

=== District 41 ===
Washington's 41st legislative district State Senate Election, 2010
Primary election
Party	Candidate	Votes	%
Republican	Steve Litzow	16,938	50.14%
Democratic	Randy Gordon (incumbent)	16,846	49.86%
Total votes		33,784	100%
General election
Republican	Steve Litzow	30,030	50.16%
Democratic	Randy Gordon (incumbent)	29,836	49.84%
Total votes		59,866	100%
Republican gain from Democratic			

=== District 42 ===
Washington's 42nd legislative district State Senate Election, 2010
Primary election
Party	Candidate	Votes	%
Republican	Doug Ericksen	21,822	61.49%
Democratic	Pat Jerns	13,669	38.51%
Total votes		35,491	100%
General election
Republican	Doug Ericksen	36,293	59.9%
Democratic	Pat Jerns	24,298	40.1%
Total votes		60,591	100%
Republican hold			

=== District 43 ===
Washington's 43rd legislative district State Senate Election, 2010
Primary election
Party	Candidate	Votes	%
Democratic	Ed Murray	21,993	100%
Total votes		21,993	100%
General election
Democratic	Ed Murray	42,365	100%
Total votes		42,365	100%
Democratic hold			

=== District 44 ===
Washington's 44th legislative district State Senate Election, 2010
Primary election
Party	Candidate	Votes	%
Republican	Dave Schmidt	11,119	36.3%
Democratic	Steve Hobbs (incumbent)	10,972	35.82%
Democratic	Lilian Kaufer	4,430	14.46%
Republican	Ryan Ferrie	4,110	13.42%
Total votes		30,631	35.82%
General election
Democratic	Steve Hobbs (incumbent)	30,441	50.78%
Republican	Dave Schmidt	29,505	49.22%
Total votes		59,946	100%
Democratic hold			

=== District 45 ===
Washington's 45th legislative district State Senate Election, 2010
Primary election
Party	Candidate	Votes	%
Republican	Andy Hill	15,979	51.51%
Democratic	Eric Oemig (incumbent)	15,045	48.49%
Total votes		31,024	100%
General election
Republican	Andy Hill	29,606	50.97%
Democratic	Eric Oemig	28,482	49.03%
Total votes		58,088	100%
Republican gain from Democratic			

=== District 46 ===
Washington's 46th legislative district State Senate Election, 2010
Primary election
Party	Candidate	Votes	%
Democratic	Scott White (incumbent)	21,812	100%
Total votes		21,812	100%
General election
Democratic	Scott White (incumbent)	40,542	100%
Total votes		40,542	100%
Democratic hold			

=== District 47 ===
Washington's 47th legislative district State Senate Election, 2010
Primary election
Party	Candidate	Votes	%
Republican	Joe Fain	14,024	55.64%
Democratic	Claudia Kauffman	11,183	44.36%
Total votes		25,207	100%
General election
Republican	Joe Fain	25,387	54.99%
Democratic	Claudia Kauffman (incumbent)	20,782	45.01%
Total votes		46,169	100%
Republican gain from Democratic			

=== District 48 ===
Washington's 48th legislative district State Senate Election, 2010
Primary election
Party	Candidate	Votes	%
Democratic	Rodney Tom (incumbent)	13,668	52.67%
Republican	Gregg Bennett	12,302	47.33%
Total votes		25,990	100%
General election
Democratic	Rodney Tom (incumbent)	24,559	52.63%
Republican	Gregg Bennett	22,104	47.37%
Total votes		46,663	100%
Democratic hold			
