= Moxie Media scandal =

Political scandal in Washington state

The Moxie Media scandal was a 2010 political scandal in Washington state. In that year's state senate primary elections, small political consulting firm Moxie Media engaged in astroturfing that resulted in a surprise loss for incumbent Jean Berkey. In an out-of-court settlement, the state fined Moxie $290,000, but the scandal had no negative long-term consequences for them. Winner Nick Harper stated he knew nothing about the scheme and became state senator despite efforts to delay his swearing in. Though the state's Democratic Party recognized Harper's achievements, rumors of an extramarital affair dogged him, and he resigned in late 2013.

== Background and overview ==
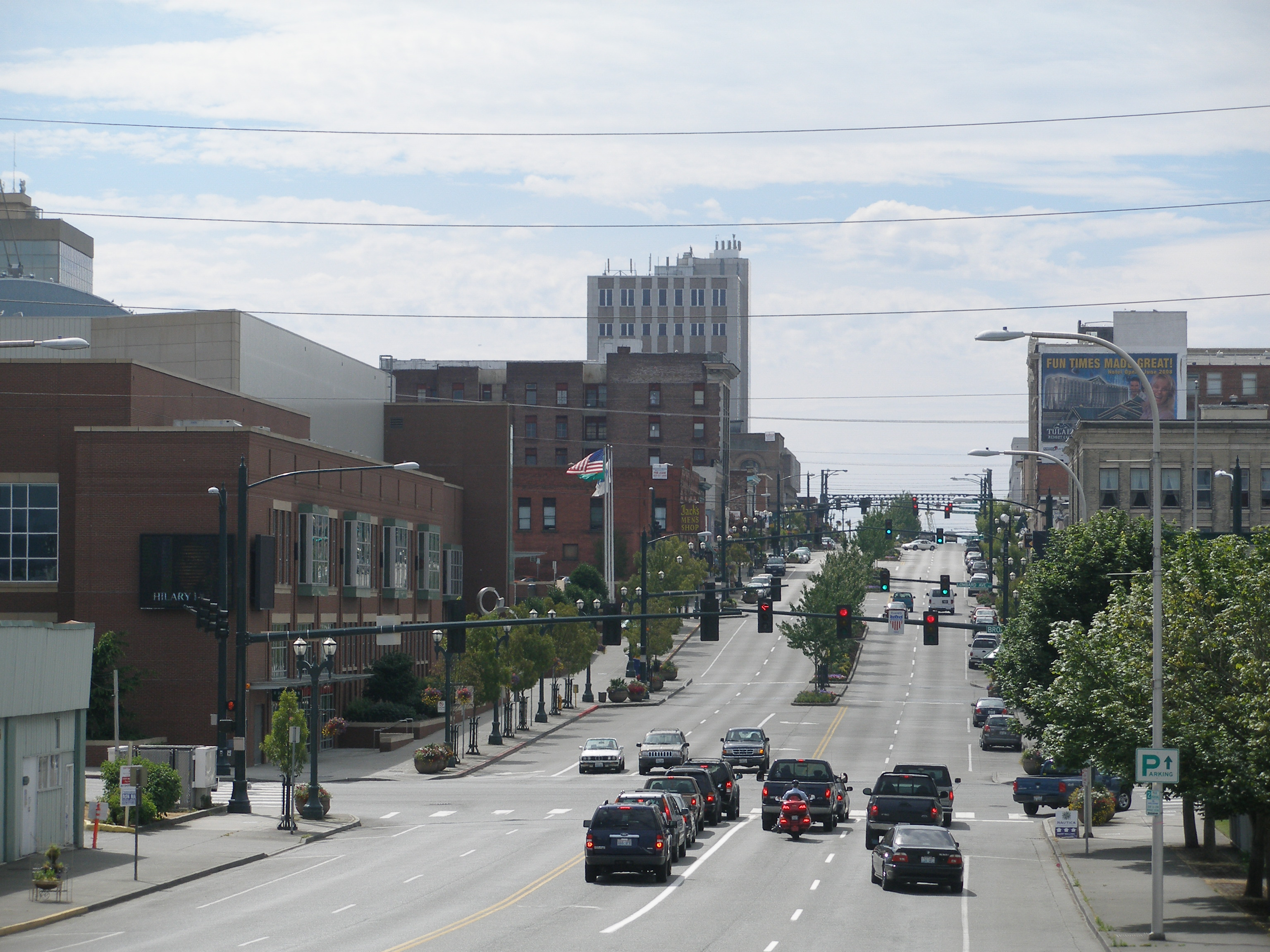
Washington's 38th legislative district primarily covers the Snohomish County city of Everett.

In 2010, the race for state senator for Washington's 38th legislative district was a three-way contest between two candidates of the Democratic Party: Everett, Washington attorney Nick Harper and incumbent legislator Jean Berkey; and third-party challenger Rod Rieger, a relatively unknown contender who ran as the candidate of the nonexistent "Conservative Party" (under Washington elections law, candidates can list themselves as a member of any party, whether it exists or not). Under Washington's nonpartisan blanket primary system, the two candidates with the highest number of total votes advance to the general election, regardless of party affiliation. This made it likely that the two Democrats, Harper and Berkey, would face each other in the general election, which it was believed Berkey would likely win.

In the run-up to the primary election, a small political consulting firm, Moxie Media, covertly directed more than $300,000 in undeclared spending from Harper's supporters to a variety of shell PACs. These committees, in turn, launched a series of direct mail attacks against Berkey, who had been known as a moderate Democrat likely to be supported by the district's conservative voters, purporting to be from a variety of groups with names like "Cut Taxes PAC" and "Conservative PAC." The mailings portrayed Berkey as a left-wing legislator and encouraged conservatives to vote for the third-party candidate, Rod Rieger. The campaign helped propel Rieger to a surprising second-place finish in the primary election, eliminating Berkey and setting up a general election contest between Harper and Rieger. In the general election Harper easily defeated Rieger, who had only raised and spent $800, relative to Harper's $55,000 in campaign funds.

== Reaction and aftermath ==
Following the election, Berkey asked the Washington State Public Disclosure Commission (PDC) to nullify the election results, and Democratic Senator Jim Kastama introduced a measure to prevent Harper from being seated in the Senate. Calling the scandal one of "the most reprehensible efforts in recent Washington state history to mislead voters," former Washington Supreme Court justice Phil Talmadge issued a public appeal to lieutenant governor Brad Owen to delay Harper's swearing-in until after a court ruling. Despite the campaign to block his seating, Harper, who denied any knowledge of the scheme, was sworn into the Senate in January 2011.

Acting on a recommendation from the PDC, Attorney-General Rob McKenna sued Moxie Media. An out-of-court settlement saw the firm agreeing to pay the state $290,000 in penalties ($140,000 was suspended provided the company committed no more violations before 2015), representing one of the largest election-related fines in the state's history. Within a year, however, the firm was doubling its pre-scandal revenue. In 2012 it grossed $2 million, primarily from new business contracts with the Washington Democratic Party.

In September 2013, the Washington state Democratic Party named Harper its "Male Elected Official of the Year." Two months later, however, Harper abruptly resigned, following rumors he had been involved in an extramarital affair with a lobbyist. Harper said his resignation was motivated by a desire to spend more time with his family.
