= Nonpartisan primary =

Top-two primary election

A nonpartisan primary, also called top-two primary, or jungle primary is a primary election in which all candidates for the same elected office run against each other at once, regardless of political party. This distinguishes them from partisan primaries, which are segregated by political party. This is the first round of a two-round system. As opposed to most two-round systems, the "first round" is a primary held before Election Day, and the "second round" is not optional (most two-round systems skip the second round if the winner of the first one gets more than 50%). A two-round system where the first round is held on Election Day is known in the US as runoff voting or top-two runoff.

The top-two system is used for all primaries in Washington and California (except presidential primaries), while Alaska has used a nonpartisan top-four primary with a ranked-choice runoff since the 2022 House special election.

Advocates claim two-round systems will elect more moderate candidates, as members of a minority party could vote for a more moderate candidate from the majority party. However, empirical research on the system has found no effect on candidate moderation or turnout among independent voters. A first round with only two winners is also susceptible to vote-splitting: the more candidates from the same party run in the primary, the more likely that party is to lose.

== Candidate party preference and ballot disclaimer ==
The nonpartisan (jungle) primary is different from the partisan blanket primary. They are similar in that voters can vote in the first round for a candidate from any political party. The partisan blanket primary was used in Washington for nearly 65 years and briefly in California. However, the blanket primary was ruled unconstitutional in 2000 by the Supreme Court of the United States in California Democratic Party v. Jones, as it forced political parties to associate with candidates they did not endorse. The nonpartisan (jungle) primary disregards party preference in determining the candidates to advance to the general election, and for that reason, it was ruled facially constitutional by the Supreme Court in the 2008 decision Washington State Grange v. Washington State Republican Party.

Chief Justice John Roberts concurred in the 2008 decision, stating: "If the ballot is designed in such a manner that no reasonable voter would believe that the candidates listed there are nominees or members of, or otherwise associated with, the parties the candidates claimed to 'prefer', the I–872 primary system would likely pass constitutional muster." Each candidate for partisan office can state a political party that they prefer. Ballots must feature disclaimers that a candidate's preference does not imply the candidate is nominated or endorsed by the party or that the party approves of or associates with the candidate.

Subsequent as applied challenges were rejected by lower courts. On October 1, 2012, the US Supreme Court refused to hear appeals from Washington Libertarian Party and Washington State Democratic Party. The Washington State Republican Party had earlier dropped out of the appeal process.

== United States ==
Both Washington and California implement a two-winner nonpartisan primary by plurality vote.

The plan is used in Texas and other states in special elections but not primaries. A notable example involved former US Senator Phil Gramm, who in 1983 (while a member of the House of Representatives), after switching from the Democratic to the Republican Party, resigned his seat as a Democrat on January 5, ran as a Republican for his own vacancy in a special election held on February 12, and won rather handily.

There have also been efforts in Oregon to pass a similar law. However, the Oregon Senate rejected it in May 2007, and it failed in a November 2008 referendum as Measure 65. Oregon voters defeated it again in November 2014 as Measure 90, despite a $2.1 million donation from former New York City Mayor Michael Bloomberg and a $2.75 million donation from former Enron executive John D. Arnold to support it.

Maryland has explored a top-two primary, erroneously naming it an open primary, such as in 2019 House Bill 26. Testimony was provided by several organizations, including FairVote and Common Cause, and independent constituents, and included statements about Condorcet systems, proportional representation and single transferable vote, and concerns that a top-two rather than top-three or more primary would not supply adequate choice for voters.

In Florida, an amendment to adopt the top-two primary was unsuccessful in 2020. 57% of votes were in favor but this failed to reach the threshold of 60% to pass.

=== Alaska ===
In the 2020 Alaska elections, voters approved Measure 2, which replaced party primaries with a single non-partisan primary, a top-four primary. The top 4 candidates advance to a general election that uses ranked-choice voting. It is used for all state and federal elections except for the president.

=== California ===
California's blanket primary system was ruled unconstitutional in California Democratic Party v. Jones in 2000. It forced political parties to associate with candidates they did not endorse. Then in 2004, Proposition 62, an initiative to bring the nonpartisan jungle primary to California, failed with only 46% of the vote. However, Proposition 14, a nearly identical piece of legislation, passed on the June 2010 ballot with 53.7% of the vote.

Under Proposition 14, statewide and congressional candidates in California, regardless of party preference, participate in the jungle primary. After the June primary election, the top two candidates advance to the November general election. That does not affect the presidential primary, local offices, or non-partisan offices such as judges and the Superintendent of Public Instruction. The California Secretary of State now calls the system a "Top-Two Primary".

==== Federal elections ====
The 2012 general election was the first non-special election in California to use the jungle primary system established by Proposition 14. As a result, eight congressional districts featured general elections with two candidates of the same party: the 15th, 30th, 35th, 40th, 43rd, and 44th with two Democrats, and the 8th and 31st with two Republicans.

In the 2014 general election, eight congressional districts featured general elections with two candidates of the same party: the 17th, 19th, 34th, 35th, 40th, and 44th with two Democrats, and the 4th and 25th with two Republicans.

In the 2016 general election, the U.S. Senate race featured two Democrats running against each other and seven congressional districts with two Democrats running against each other: the 17th, 29th, 32nd, 34th, 37th, 44th, and 46th. There were no races with two Republicans running against each other.

==== California 15th Congressional District, 2012 ====
The 15th district is based in the East Bay and includes Hayward and Livermore. Democrat Pete Stark, who represented the 13th district from 1993 to 2013 and its predecessors since 1973, lost reelection to fellow Democrat Eric Swalwell in the general election after Stark won the primary.

California's 15th congressional district election, 2012
Primary election
Party	Candidate	Votes	%
Democratic	Pete Stark (incumbent)	39,943	42.1
Democratic	Eric Swalwell	34,347	36.0
No party preference	Christopher "Chris" J. Pareja	20,618	21.7
Total votes		94,908	100.0
General election
Democratic	Eric Swalwell	120,388	52.1
Democratic	Pete Stark (incumbent)	110,646	47.9
Total votes		231,034	100.0
Democratic hold			

=== Washington (state) ===
Along with California and Alaska, Washington had a blanket primary system that allowed every voter to choose a candidate of any party for each position. That kind of system was ruled unconstitutional by the US Supreme Court in California Democratic Party v. Jones (2000) because it forced political parties to endorse candidates against their will.

The Washington State Legislature passed a new primary system in 2004, which would have created a top-two nonpartisan primary system. It provided an open primary as a backup, giving Governor Gary Locke the option to choose. Although Secretary of State Sam Reed advocated the top-two system, on April 1, 2004, Locke used the line-item veto to activate the open primary instead. In response, Washington's Initiative 872 was filed on January 8, 2004, by Terry Hunt from the Washington Grange, which proposed to create a nonpartisan (jungle) primary in that state. The measure passed with 59.8% of the vote (1,632,225 yes votes and 1,095,190 no votes) in 2004. On March 18, 2008, the US Supreme Court ruled, in Washington State Grange v. Washington State Republican Party, that Washington's Initiative 872 was constitutionally permissible. Unlike the earlier blanket primary, it officially disregards party affiliation while allowing candidates to state their party preference. However, the court wanted to wait for more evidence before addressing the chief items in the complaint and remanded the decision to the lower courts.

Washington state implemented this Top 2 primary, starting in the 2008 election, which applies to federal, state, and local elections, but not to presidential elections. There is no voter party registration in Washington, and candidates are not restricted to stating an affiliation with an established major or minor party. The candidate has up to 16 characters to describe on the ballot the party that they prefer. Some candidates state a preference for an established major party, such as the Democratic Party or the Republican Party, while others use the ballot to send a message, such as Prefers No New Taxes Party or Prefers Salmon Yoga Party. Since this is a "preference" and not a declaration of party membership, candidates can assert party affiliation without the party's approval or use alternate terms for a given party. Gubernatorial candidate Dino Rossi's 2008 stated preference was for the "GOP Party", although he is a prominent Republican.

==== Washington state legislature, 14th district, 2010 ====
First Ballot, August 17, 2010

Candidate	Party Preference	Support	Outcome
Norm Johnson	Republican	10,129 (44.26%)	Runoff
Michele Strobel	Republican	8,053 (35.19%)	Runoff
Scott Brumback	Democratic	4,702 (20.55%)	Defeated

Second Ballot November 2, 2010

Candidate	Party Preference	Support	Outcome
Norm Johnson	Republican	19,044 (52.5%)	Elected
Michele Strobel	Republican	17,229 (47.5%)	Defeated

In this race a three-way primary led to a two-way race between two members of the same party (Republicans) in the general election. With over 20% of the population voting for the Democrat and neither Republican winning close to a majority in the primary, both of the Republican candidates had to appeal to Democrats and other voters who did not support them in the first round. For example, incumbent Norm Johnson came out in favor of same-sex civil unions, moving to the left of challenger Michele Strobel, who opposed them.

==== Washington state legislature, 38th district, State Senate, 2010 ====
First Ballot August 17, 2010

Candidate	Party Preference	Support	Outcome
Nick Harper	Democratic	7,193 (35.09%)	Runoff
Rod Rieger	Conservative	6,713 (32.75%)	Runoff
Jean Berkey	Democratic	6,591 (32.16%)	Defeated

Second Ballot November 2, 2010

Candidate	Party Preference	Support	Outcome
Nick Harper	Democratic	22,089 (59.73%)	Elected
Rod Rieger	Conservative	14,892 (40.27%)	Defeated

In this heavily Democratic district, Berkey was officially endorsed by the 38th District Democratic Party. However, Democratic challenger Nick Harper bankrolled ads for the Republican candidate to "Squeeze the Middle" and prevent the moderate incumbent Berkey from running in the general election. When Berkey placed third in the primary by a margin of 122 votes, the Moxie Media scandal ensued: the state's election watchdog committee unanimously voted to refer the case to the state Attorney General Rob McKenna, who within hours "filed suit, alleging multiple campaign-finance violations". Despite the call of several former state senators to hold another election, the election results were upheld, and Berkey was prevented from running in the general election. Harper easily won the subsequent uncompetitive runoff election.

==== Washington state US Senate race, 2010 ====
First Ballot, August 17, 2010 (only top three vote-getters listed)

Candidate	Party Preference	Support	Outcome
Patty Murray	Democratic	670,284 (46.22%)	Runoff
Dino Rossi	Republican	483,305 (33.33%)	Runoff
Clint Didier	Republican	185,034 (12.76%)	Defeated

Second Ballot November 2, 2010

Candidate	Party Preference	Support	Outcome
Patty Murray	Democratic	1,314,930 (52.36%)	Elected
Dino Rossi	Republican	1,196,164 (47.64%)	Defeated

In this race, the three leading candidates' competition resulted in a more moderate and popular Republican facing off against the incumbent Democrat, with a relatively close general election. Clint Didier and Dino Rossi were the two main Republicans vying to run against the incumbent Democratic Senator Patty Murray. Rossi had much greater name recognition, had narrowly lost two races for governor, and was favored by the party establishment. Didier, a former tight end for the National Football League's Washington Redskins, had never run for elected office and was endorsed by Tea Party favorites Ron Paul and Sarah Palin. Didier might have been able to win the GOP nomination from Rossi in a closed primary that rewards candidates for appealing to the hard line of their base, but the more moderate Rossi was easily able to defeat Didier in the Top Two primary. While one might expect more Democrats in the Top Two primary to vote tactically for Didier, the Republican candidate who was doing much worse in polls against Murray, most Democrats seemed content voting for Murray. If any tactical voting occurred, it seemed to be on the Republican side, with the vast majority of the Republican voters choosing Rossi, perceived as a more electable candidate. In this case, the Top Two primary resulted in a more moderate Republican candidate running against the Democratic incumbent, and likely a much more competitive race than if the Tea Party candidate had run against Murray.

==== Washington 4th Congressional District, 2014 ====
The 4th district is a large and predominantly rural district in Central Washington that encompasses numerous counties and is dominated by the Tri-Cities and Yakima areas. Republican Doc Hastings, who represented the 4th district since 1995, retired. The two winners of the top two primary were the Tea Party candidate Clint Didier (endorsed by Ron Paul) and Dan Newhouse, the former Director of the Washington State Department of Agriculture under Christine Gregoire and Jay Inslee and former State Representative. In a close general election, Newhouse prevailed.

Top two primary results
Party	Candidate	Votes	%
Republican	Clint Didier	33,965	31.81
Republican	Dan Newhouse	27,326	25.59
Democratic	Estakio Beltran	13,062	12.23
Republican	Janéa Holmquist Newbry	11,061	10.36
Republican	George Cicotte	6,863	6.43
Democratic	Tony Sandoval	6,744	6.32
Independent	Richard Wright	3,270	3.06
Republican	Gavin Seim	2,107	1.97
Independent	Josh Ramirez	1,496	1.40
Republican	Glen R. Stockwell	547	0.51
Republican	Gordon Allen Pross	178	0.17
Republican	Kevin Midbust	161	0.15
Total votes		106,780	100.0

General Election - November 4, 2014
Party	Candidate	Votes	%
Republican	Dan Newhouse	77,772	50.81
Republican	Clint Didier	75,307	49.19
Total votes		153,079	100.0
Republican hold			

== Analysis ==
Though the intention is to allow multiple candidates from the majority party to advance to the second round, critics note that this can also happen to a minority party when that party runs fewer candidates than another and thus faces less vote-splitting. Under the nonpartisan blanket primary, a party with two candidates and only 41% popular support would beat a party with three candidates and 59% popular support if voters split their votes evenly among candidates for their own party. For example, in Washington's 2016 primary for state treasurer, Democrats won a majority of the vote but failed to move on to the general election:

Candidate	Party Preference	Support	Outcome
Duane Davidson	Republican	322,374 (25.09%)	Runoff
Michael Waite	Republican	299,766 (23.33%)	Runoff
Marko Liias	Democratic	261,633 (20.36%)	Defeated
John Paul Comerford	Democratic	230,904 (17.97%)	Defeated
Alec Fisken	Democratic	170,117 (13.24%)	Defeated

Political science professor Todd Donovan published an article in 2012 for the California Journal of Politics & Policy called "The Top Two Primary: What Can California Learn from Washington?" Donovan was the only expert witness in favor of the top-two idea, for the as applied court challenge of Top-Two. His academic paper states, "The partisan structure of Washington's legislature appears unaltered by the new primary system." Donovan concluded, "The aggregate of all this did not add up to a legislature that looked different or functioned differently from the legislature elected under a partisan primary."

In Washington, major parties originally used an alternate process of party endorsement for partisan legislative and county administrative positions. This would ensure that one official party candidate will be in the primary, theoretically reducing the risk of intra-party vote-splits. However, the law does not allow nominations or endorsements by interest groups, political action committees, political parties, labor unions, editorial boards, or other private organizations to be printed on the ballot.

The indication of party preference as opposed to party affiliation opens the door for candidates to misrepresent their leanings or otherwise confuse voters. In 2008, a Washington gubernatorial candidate indicated party preference as "G.O.P." instead of Republican. A public poll found that 25% of the public did not know that the two terms mean the same thing.

Further research on California's 2012 jungle primaries suggests that a jungle primary does not tend to lead to large amounts of crossover votes. Most voters who crossed over did so for strategic reasons. Furthermore, there is evidence that having the top two candidates from the same party could lead to a drop in voter participation in the second round. With regards to reducing political polarization, this does not seem to hold true. Due to lack of crossover votes, an extreme candidate from the majority party can still win over a moderate from either party.

== See also ==
- Instant-runoff voting – Single-winner ranked-choice electoral system
- Two-party-preferred vote – Result of election after distribution of preferences
- Two-round system – Voting system
