= Senator Harper =

Senator Harper may refer to:

== Members of the United States Senate ==
- Robert Goodloe Harper (1765–1825), U.S. Senator from Maryland in 1816
- William Harper (South Carolina politician) (1790–1847), U.S. Senator from South Carolina in 1832

== United States state senate members ==
- Francis Jacob Harper (1800–1837), Pennsylvania State Senate
- George B. Harper (1918–1988), New Jersey State Senate
- Jack Harper (politician) (born 1967), Arizona State Senate
- Joseph M. Harper (1787–1865), New Hampshire State Senate
- Nick Harper (politician) (born 1979), Washington State Senate
- Thelma Harper (politician) (1940–2021), Tennessee State Senate
- Tyler Harper (born 1986), Georgia State Senate
- Wayne Harper (born 1956), Utah State Senate
