= Patty Murray =

American politician (born 1950)

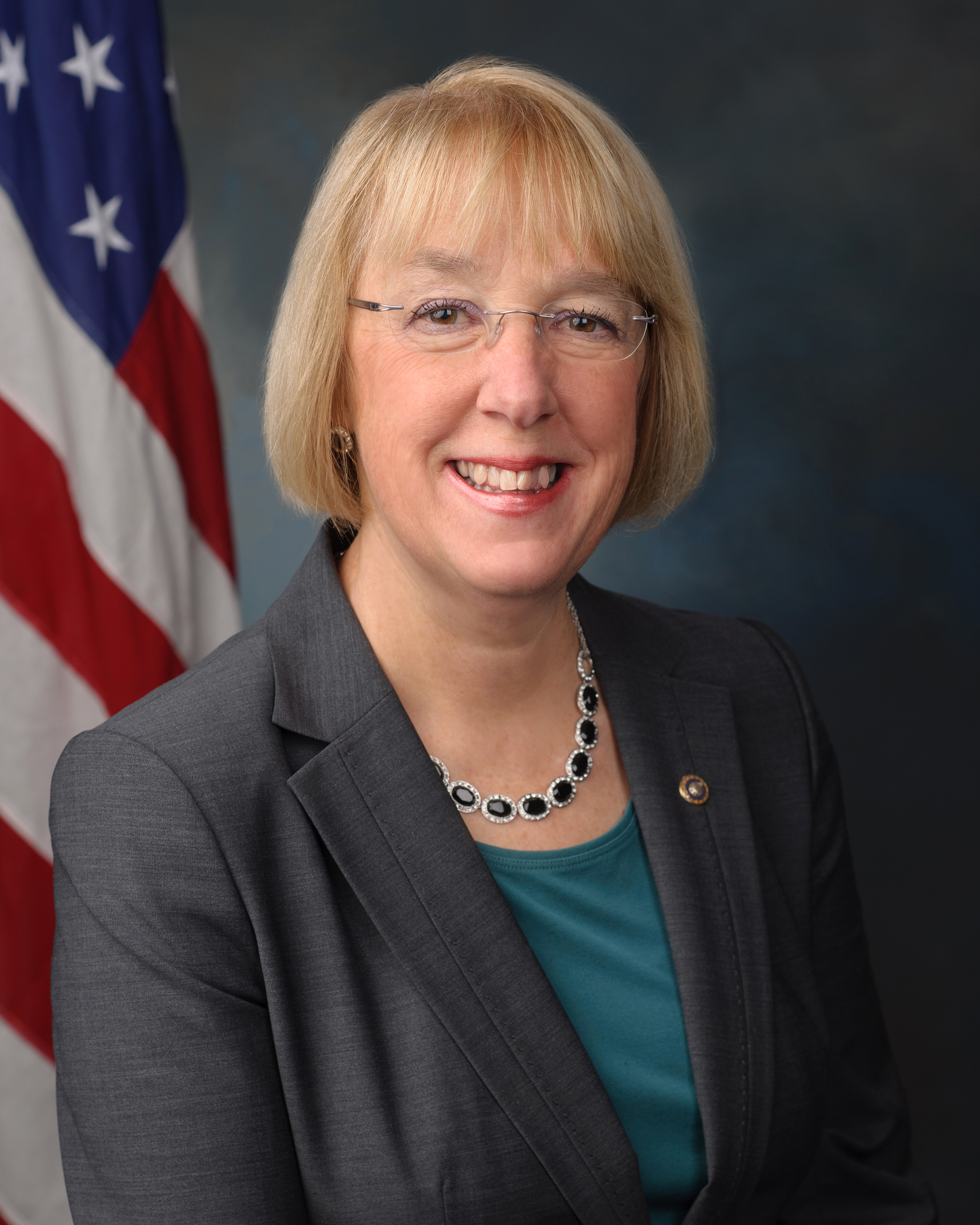
- Official portrait, 2013

Vice Chair of the Senate Appropriations Committee
- Incumbent
- Assumed office January 3, 2025
- Preceded by: Susan Collins

President pro tempore of the United States Senate
- In office January 3, 2023 – January 3, 2025
- Preceded by: Patrick Leahy
- Succeeded by: Chuck Grassley

United States Senator from Washington
- Incumbent
- Assumed office January 3, 1993 Serving with Maria Cantwell
- Preceded by: Brock Adams
Senate positions
President pro tempore emerita of the United States Senate
Incumbent
Assumed office January 3, 2025
Preceded by	Chuck Grassley
Chair of the Senate Appropriations Committee
In office January 3, 2023 – January 3, 2025
Preceded by	Patrick Leahy
Succeeded by	Susan Collins
Chair of the Senate Health, Education, Labor and Pensions Committee
In office February 3, 2021 – January 3, 2023
Preceded by	Lamar Alexander
Succeeded by	Bernie Sanders
Chair of the Senate Budget Committee
In office January 3, 2013 – January 3, 2015
Preceded by	Kent Conrad
Succeeded by	Mike Enzi
Chair of the Senate Veterans' Affairs Committee
In office January 3, 2011 – January 3, 2013
Preceded by	Daniel Akaka
Succeeded by	Bernie Sanders
Senate Assistant Democratic Leader
In office January 3, 2017 – January 3, 2023
Leader	Chuck Schumer
Preceded by	Position established
Succeeded by	Position abolished
Secretary of the Senate Democratic Caucus
In office January 3, 2007 – January 3, 2017
Leader	Harry Reid
Preceded by	Debbie Stabenow
Succeeded by	Tammy Baldwin
Chair of the Democratic Senatorial Campaign Committee
In office January 3, 2011 – January 3, 2013
Leader	Harry Reid
Preceded by	Bob Menendez
Succeeded by	Michael Bennet
In office January 3, 2001 – January 3, 2003
Leader	Tom Daschle
Preceded by	Robert Torricelli
Succeeded by	Jon Corzine

Member of the Washington State Senate from the 1st district
- In office January 9, 1989 – January 3, 1993
- Preceded by: Bill Kiskaddon
- Succeeded by: Rosemary McAuliffe

Personal details
- Born: Patricia Lynn Johns; October 11, 1950 (age 76) Bothell, Washington, U.S.
- Party: Democratic
- Spouse: Rob Murray (m. 1972)
- Children: 2
- Education: Washington State University (BA)
- Website: Senate website Campaign website
- Murray's voice Murray opposing legislation that would enact nationwide abortion restrictions. Recorded September 14, 2022

Patricia Lynn Murray (née Johns; born October 11, 1950) is an American politician serving as the senior United States senator from Washington, a seat she has held since 1993. From 2023 to 2025, she held the position of president pro tempore of the United States Senate, becoming the first woman to hold the position. Prior to serving in the U.S. Senate, she served in the Washington State Senate from 1989 to 1993. She is a member of the Democratic Party.

Born and raised in Bothell, Washington, Murray graduated from Washington State University with a degree in physical education. She worked as a preschool teacher and later as a parenting teacher at Shoreline Community College. An advocate for environmental and education issues, Murray was elected to serve on her local school board in King County. One of her early elected political mentors was Donn Charnley.

In 1988, she was elected to the Washington State Senate, defeating two-term incumbent Bill Kiskaddon, and served one term before being elected to the U.S. Senate in 1992. She has been re-elected five times, most recently in 2022.

As a senator, Murray has been in party leadership since 2001, having served as chair of the Democratic Senatorial Campaign Committee, Democratic Conference secretary, and assistant Democratic leader. Throughout her tenure, she has chaired the Senate Appropriations Committee, Veterans' Affairs Committee, the Budget Committee, and the Health, Education, Labor, and Pensions Committee. Murray drew national attention for her work in negotiating the Bipartisan Budget Act of 2013 with Republican congressman Paul Ryan.

Murray is currently the third-most senior U.S. senator, the most senior Senate Democrat, the longest-serving female senator upon Dianne Feinstein's death in 2023, and the dean of Washington's congressional delegation since 2017 upon Representative Jim McDermott's retirement.

== Early life and education ==
One of seven children, Murray was born in Bothell, Washington, a daughter of David L. Johns and Beverly A. McLaughlin. Her mother was an accountant. Her father served in World War II and was awarded a Purple Heart. Her ancestry includes Welsh, Irish, Scottish, and French-Canadian. When she was a teenager, her family was forced to apply for welfare assistance when her father became disabled due to multiple sclerosis. He had been the manager of a five-and-ten store. Murray attended Saint Brendan Catholic School as a young child.

Murray received a bachelor of arts degree in physical education from Washington State University in 1972.

== Early career ==
Murray was a preschool teacher for several years and taught a parenting class at Shoreline Community College from 1984 to 1987. As a citizen-lobbyist for environmental and educational issues, Murray has said that a state representative once told her she could not make a difference because she was just a "mom in tennis shoes". The phrase stuck, and she later used it in her successful campaigns for the Shoreline School District board of directors (1985–1989), Washington State Senate (1989–1993), and United States Senate (1993–present). Murray was successful in gathering grassroots support to strike down proposed preschool program budget cuts.

In 1988, Murray unseated two-term incumbent Republican State Senator Bill Kiskaddon.

== U.S. Senate (1993–present) ==
Murray has served in the United States Senate since her election in 1992. For the 118th Congress in 2023, she was elected Senate president pro tempore after Patrick Leahy retired from the Senate; the office is usually held by the longest-serving senior senator of the majority party, but Senator Dianne Feinstein (who was also elected in 1992, but took her seat a few months prior to Murray because she won a special election, rather than a regularly scheduled one) declined the post due to ailing health, leaving Murray the next in line for the position. Murray ultimately became the most senior serving Democrat upon Feinstein's death later that year. Murray is the first woman to hold the position.

Murray is the first woman, and 33rd senator overall, to have cast 10,000 votes in the Senate, having reached the threshold on April 20, 2023.

=== Elections ===
==== 1992 ====
In 1992, Murray announced her candidacy for the U.S. Senate after The Seattle Times published a series of articles alleging that incumbent Democratic Senator Brock Adams had sexually assaulted a number of women. Adams denied the allegations, but his popularity weakened considerably, and he chose to retire rather than risk losing the seat for his party. Murray advanced alongside Republican Congressman Rod Chandler from the blanket primary. In the general election, she defeated Chandler, 54% to 46%, despite being outspent by a wide margin. Chandler seemed to have the upper hand in one of the debates until he responded to Murray's criticism for spending $120,000 on congressional mailings during rising unemployment and declining family income as part of an economic recession by quoting the Roger Miller song "Dang Me". Chandler was further damaged by the unpopularity in the Pacific Northwest of President George H. W. Bush, who was largely blamed for the recession.

1992 U.S. Senate primary in Washington
Party	Candidate	Votes	%
Democratic	Patty Murray	318,455	28.32%
Republican	Rod Chandler	228,083	20.28%
Democratic	Don Bonker	208,321	18.52%
Republican	Leo K. Thorsness	185,498	16.49%
Republican	Tim Hill	128,232	11.40%
Democratic	Gene D. Hart	15,894	1.41%
Democratic	Marshall	11,659	1.04%
Washington Taxpayers	William Cassius Goodloe	10,877	0.97%
Democratic	Jeffery Brian Venezia	7,259	0.65%
Independent	LaPriel C. Barnes	7,044	0.63%
Socialist Workers	Mark Severs	3,309	0.29%
Total votes		1,124,631	100.00%

1992 United States Senate election in Washington
Party	Candidate	Votes	%
Democratic	Patty Murray	1,197,973	53.99%
Republican	Rod Chandler	1,020,829	46.01%
Total votes		2,218,802	100.0%
Democratic hold			

==== 1998 ====
In 1998, Murray faced Congresswoman Linda Smith, a staunch conservative and maverick who was one of nine House Republicans to vote against confirming U.S. House Speaker Newt Gingrich in early 1997, opposed gay rights and viewed homosexuality as a "morally unfit inclination". Murray heavily outspent her and was reelected, 58% to 42%.

1998 U.S. Senate primary in Washington
Party	Candidate	Votes	%
Democratic	Patty Murray (incumbent)	479,009	45.86%
Republican	Linda Smith	337,407	32.31%
Republican	Chris Bayley	155,864	14.92%
Republican	Warren E. Hanson	22,411	2.15%
Democratic	Amundson Amundseon	10,905	1.04%
Republican	John Marshall	9,662	0.93%
Reform	Mike The Mover	6,596	0.63%
Democratic	James Sherwood Stokes	5,989	0.57%
Democratic	Harvey Vernier	3,882	0.37%
Socialist Workers	Nan Bailey	3,709	0.36%
Reform	Steve Thompson	3,371	0.32%
Democratic	Robert Tilden Medley	3,350	0.32%
Democratic	Charlie R. Jackson	2,234	0.21%
Total votes		1,044,389	100.00%

General election results
Party	Candidate	Votes	%
Democratic	Patty Murray (Incumbent)	1,103,184	58.41%
Republican	Linda Smith	785,377	41.59%
Total votes		1,888,561	100.00%
Democratic hold			

==== 2004 ====
In 2004, Murray faced Republican U.S. Representative George Nethercutt. Term limits became an issue in the campaign, as Democrats seized on Nethercutt's broken term-limits pledge that he had made when he unexpectedly unseated Speaker Tom Foley in 1994. Nethercutt was also hampered by his lack of name recognition in the more densely populated western part of the state, home to two-thirds of the state's population. Washington has not elected a senator from east of the Cascades since Miles Poindexter in 1916. Other important issues included national security and the war in Iraq. Nethercutt supported the 2003 Invasion of Iraq, while Murray opposed it. Nethercutt was a heavy underdog from the start and his campaign never gained much traction. Murray was reelected, 55% to 43%.

Democratic primary election results
Party	Candidate	Votes	%
Democratic	Patty Murray (incumbent)	709,477	92.20
Democratic	Warren Hanson	46,487	6.04
Democratic	Mohammad Said	13,526	1.76

General election results
Party	Candidate	Votes	%
Democratic	Patty Murray (incumbent)	1,549,708	54.98
Republican	George R. Nethercutt, Jr.	1,204,584	42.74
Libertarian	J. Mills	34,055	1.21
Green	Mark B. Wilson	30,304	1.08
Total votes		2,818,651	100.00%
Democratic hold			

==== 2010 ====
The 2010 election was the first Senate election to be held under the new blanket primary since Initiative 872 had passed in 2004. In the August 17 primary, Murray appeared on the ballot alongside four other Democratic candidates, six Republican candidates, a Reform Party candidate and three independent candidates. She received a plurality, 46%, and advanced to the general election along with her main Republican challenger, former state Senator and two-time gubernatorial nominee Dino Rossi, who received 33%. Leading up to the election, several prominent Washington State newspapers endorsed Murray. Rossi conceded the election to Murray on November 4, 2010, two days after election day. She won 52.36% of the vote to Rossi's 47.64%, Murray's smallest reelection margin to date.

Blanket primary election results
Party	Candidate	Votes	%
Democratic	Patty Murray (incumbent)	670,284	46.22
Republican	Dino Rossi	483,305	33.33
Republican	Clint Didier	185,034	12.76
Republican	Paul Akers	37,231	2.57
Independent	Skip Mercer	12,122	0.84
Democratic	Charles Allen	11,525	0.79
Democratic	Bob Burr	11,344	0.78
Republican	Norma Gruber	9,162	0.63
Republican	Michael Latimer	6,545	0.45
Democratic	Mike the Mover	6,019	0.42
Democratic	Goodspaceguy	4,718	0.33
Reform	William Baker	4,593	0.32
Independent	Mohammad Said	3,387	0.23
Independent	Schalk Leonard	2,818	0.19
Republican	William Chovil	2,039	0.14
Total votes		1,450,126	100

General election results
Party	Candidate	Votes	%
Democratic	Patty Murray (incumbent)	1,314,930	52.36
Republican	Dino Rossi	1,196,164	47.64
Total votes		2,511,094	100.00
Democratic hold			

==== 2016 ====
Murray ran for a fifth term in 2016. She faced three Democratic challengers in the August 2, 2016, primary election. In the general election, she faced King County Councilman Chris Vance. She defeated Vance, 59% to 41%.

Blanket primary election results
Party	Candidate	Votes	%
Democratic	Patty Murray (incumbent)	745,421	53.82%
Republican	Chris Vance	381,004	27.51%
Republican	Eric John Makus	57,825	4.18%
Democratic	Phil Cornell	46,460	3.35%
Republican	Scott Nazarino	41,542	3.00%
Libertarian	Mike Luke	20,988	1.52%
Democratic	Mohammad Said	13,362	0.96%
Conservative	Donna Rae Lands	11,472	0.83%
Independent	Ted Cummings	11,028	0.80%
Human Rights	Sam Wright	10,751	0.78%
Republican	Uncle Mover	8,569	0.62%
System Reboot	Jeremy Teuton	7,991	0.58%
Democratic	Thor Amundson	7,906	0.57%
Independent	Chuck Jackson	6,318	0.46%
Lincoln Caucus	Pano Churchill	5,150	0.37%
Independent	Zach Haller	5,092	0.37%
StandUpAmerica	Alex Tsimerman	4,117	0.30%
Total votes		1,384,996	100.00%

General election results
Party	Candidate	Votes	%
Democratic	Patty Murray (incumbent)	1,913,979	59.01
Republican	Chris Vance	1,329,338	40.99
Total votes		3,243,317	100.00%
Democratic hold			

==== 2022 ====
In the 2022 election, Murray won reelection to a sixth term over Republican Tiffany Smiley.

Blanket primary election results
Party	Candidate	Votes	%
Democratic	Patty Murray (incumbent)	1,002,811	52.26%
Republican	Tiffany Smiley	646,917	33.71%
Trump Republican	Leon Lawson	59,134	3.08%
Republican	John Guenther	55,426	2.89%
Democratic	Ravin Pierre	22,172	1.16%
JFK Republican	Dave Saulibio	19,341	1.01%
Independent	Naz Paul	18,858	0.98%
Republican	Bill Hirt	15,276	0.80%
Democratic	Mohammad Hassan Said	13,995	0.73%
Socialist Workers	Henry Clay Dennison	13,901	0.72%
Democratic	Dr Pano Churchill	11,859	0.62%
Democratic	Bryan Solstin	9,627	0.50%
Independent	Charlie (Chuck) Jackson	8,604	0.45%
Independent	Jon Butler	5,413	0.28%
Independent	Thor Amundson	5,133	0.27%
No party preference	Martin D. Hash	4,725	0.25%
No party preference	Dan Phan Doan	3,049	0.16%
Democratic	Sam Cusmir	2,688	0.14%
Total votes		1,918,929	100.00%

General election results
Party	Candidate	Votes	%
Democratic	Patty Murray (incumbent)	1,741,827	57.15
Republican	Tiffany Smiley	1,299,322	42.63
Write-in		6,751	0.22
Total votes		3,047,900	100.00%
Democratic hold			

=== 119th United States Congress Committee assignments ===
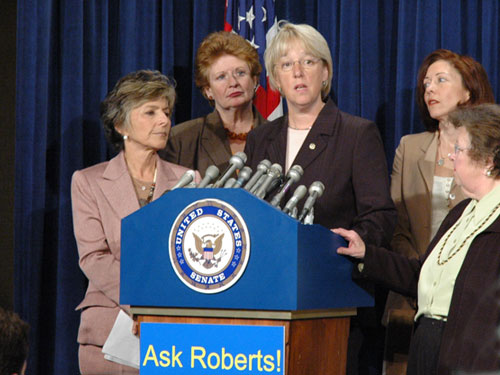
Senator Murray at the podium, joined by (left to right), Sen. Barbara Boxer (D-CA), Sen. Debbie Stabenow (D-MI), Sen. Maria Cantwell (D-WA) and Sen. Barbara Mikulski (D-MD) in 2005, launching an interactive website regarding the nomination of Judge John Roberts as the Chief Justice of the United States.

- Committee on Appropriations (ranking member)
- Committee on the Budget
- Committee on Health, Education, Labor, and Pensions
- Committee on Veterans' Affairs

=== Caucus memberships ===
- Senate Oceans Caucus
- Senate Aerospace Caucus
- Afterschool Caucuses
- Congressional NextGen 9-1-1 Caucus
- Congressional Coalition on Adoption

=== Legislation ===
On February 28, 2013, Murray introduced the Green Mountain Lookout Heritage Protection Act into the Senate. The bill would prevent the United States Forest Service from removing a building from the Glacier Peak Wilderness Area in the state of Washington unless the agency determines that the structure is unsafe for visitors. Murray argued that the bill should be passed in order to help the tourism industry in the area while protecting the lookout point in question. The bill would be "a very small step in what will be a very long recovery" and would "provide a glimmer of hope for the long-term recovery of this area", she said, referring to the area's recovery from the casualties and damage caused by the 2014 Oso mudslide. The bill passed both the House and the Senate.

== Political positions ==
=== Abortion ===
Murray supports abortion rights. She opposed the Pain-Capable Unborn Child Protection Act, a bill criminalizing abortions after 20 weeks of pregnancy, saying on the Senate floor: "I oppose the fact that we are still voting on whether women and doctors are best equipped to make health care decisions — or politicians here in D.C." She voted against a bill that banned federal funding for Planned Parenthood. She also voted against restricting US funding for UN family planning programs.

=== Agriculture ===
In March 2019, Murray was one of 38 senators to sign a letter to Secretary of Agriculture Sonny Perdue warning that dairy farmers "have continued to face market instability and are struggling to survive the fourth year of sustained low prices" and urging his department to "strongly encourage these farmers to consider the Dairy Margin Coverage program".

In June 2019, Murray and 18 other Democratic senators sent USDA Inspector General (IG) Phyllis K. Fong a letter requesting that the IG investigate USDA instances of retaliation and political decision-making and asserting that not to do so would mean these "actions could be perceived as a part of this administration’s broader pattern of not only discounting the value of federal employees, but suppressing, undermining, discounting, and wholesale ignoring scientific data produced by their own qualified scientists".

=== Environmental policy ===
In October 2017, Murray was one of 19 senators to sign a letter to Environmental Protection Agency Administrator Scott Pruitt questioning Pruitt's decision to repeal the Clean Power Plan, asserting that the repeal's proposal used "mathematical sleights of hand to overstate the costs of industry compliance with the 2015 Rule and understate the benefits that will be lost if the 2017 repeal is finalized", and that denying science and fabricating math would fail to "satisfy the requirements of the law, nor will it slow the increase in frequency and intensity of extreme weather events, the inexorable rise in sea levels, or the other dire effects of global warming that our planet is already experiencing".

In February 2019, in response to reports of the EPA intending to decide against setting drinking water limits for perfluorooctane sulfonic acid (PFOS) and perfluorooctanoic acid (PFOA) as part of an upcoming national strategy to manage the aforementioned class of chemicals, Murray was one of 20 senators to sign a letter to Acting EPA Administrator Andrew R. Wheeler calling on the EPA "to develop enforceable federal drinking water standards for PFOA and PFOS, as well as institute immediate actions to protect the public from contamination from additional per- and polyfluoroalkyl substances (PFAS)".

=== Federal budget ===
On December 10, 2013, Murray announced that she and Republican Representative Paul Ryan had reached a compromise agreement on a two-year, bipartisan budget bill, the Bipartisan Budget Act of 2013.

The deal was scheduled to be voted on first in the House and then the Senate. Some believed House Democrats would pass the deal as a way to reduce the sequester cuts, but the ranking Democrat on the House Budget Committee, Chris Van Hollen, said on December 12, 2013, that members of his party were outraged that House Republicans were planning to adjourn without addressing unemployment benefits. Van Hollen said that "it is too early to say" whether a majority of House Democrats would vote for the budget bill. The deal was also unpopular with many conservatives.

Murray put the controversial intelligence ports-data project Global Trade Exchange into the Homeland Security budget.

=== Foreign relations ===
==== Central America ====
In April 2019, Murray was one of 34 senators to sign a letter to President Trump, encouraging him "to listen to members of your own Administration and reverse a decision that will damage our national security and aggravate conditions inside Central America", asserting that Trump had "consistently expressed a flawed understanding of U.S. foreign assistance" since becoming president, and that he was "personally undermining efforts to promote U.S. national security and economic prosperity" through preventing the use of Fiscal Year 2018 national security funding. The senators argued that foreign assistance to Central American countries created less migration to the U.S., citing the funding's helping to improve conditions in those countries.

==== Myanmar ====
Murray condemned the genocide of the Rohingya Muslim minority in Myanmar, and called for a stronger response to the crisis.

==== Russia ====
In December 2010, Murray voted for the ratification of New START, a nuclear arms reduction treaty between the U.S. and the Russian Federation obliging both countries to have no more than 1,550 strategic warheads as well as 700 launchers deployed during the next seven years along with providing a continuation of on-site inspections that halted when START I expired the previous year. It was the first arms treaty with Russia in eight years.

In December 2018, after U.S. Secretary of State Mike Pompeo announced the Trump administration was suspending its obligations in the Intermediate-Range Nuclear Forces Treaty in 60 days in the event that Russia continued to violate the treaty, Murray was one of 26 senators to sign a letter expressing concern over the administration "now abandoning generations of bipartisan U.S. leadership around the paired goals of reducing the global role and number of nuclear weapons and ensuring strategic stability with America's nuclear-armed adversaries" and calling on Trump to continue arms negotiations.

==== Wars in Iraq and Afghanistan ====
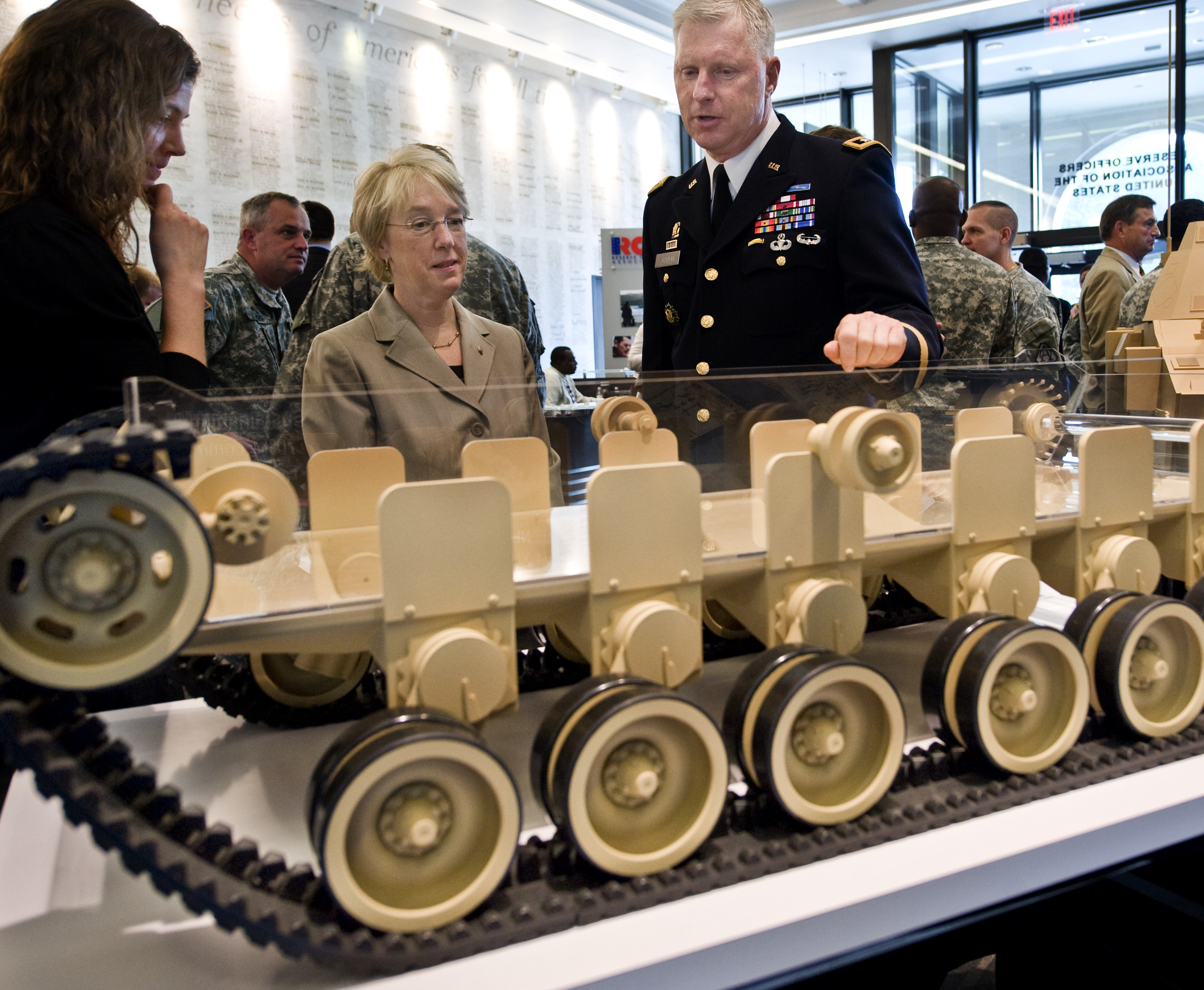
Major General Galen Jackman briefs Senator Patty Murray on the Manned Ground Vehicle program in Washington, D.C.

In October 2002, Murray was one of 21 Democrats in the Senate to vote against the War Authorization for invading Iraq. Quoted from her Senate speech:

Mr. President, if we do take action in Iraq, there is no doubt that our armed forces will prevail. We will win a war with Iraq decisively, and, God willing, we will win it quickly. But what happens after the war? That will have as big an impact on our future peace and security. Will we be obligated to rebuild Iraq? If so, how? Our economy is reeling, our budget is in deficit, and we have no estimate of the cost of rebuilding. And with whom? As The New York Times columnist Tom Friedman points out, there's a retail store mentality that suggests to some—if "you break it, you buy it."

In December 2002, speaking to students at Columbia River High School in Vancouver, Murray made a number of remarks about Osama bin Laden as she attempted to explain why the US had such problems winning hearts and minds in the Muslim world, and how bin Laden had garnered support among some in the Middle East. Among other things, she said that bin Laden has "been out in these countries for decades, building schools, building roads, building infrastructure, building daycare facilities, building health care facilities, and the people are extremely grateful. He's made their lives better. We have not done that." This attracted attention from political opponents, who argued that this was inaccurate and constituted support for bin Laden.

=== Health care ===
In 2014, Murray introduced legislation in the Senate called The Emergency Contraception Access and Education Act. The bill would require hospitals that receive federal funding to provide rape victims with emergency contraception. In July 2014, she introduced an amendment to a bill in the Senate to require health insurance plans to offer contraceptive coverage to patients regardless of employers' beliefs, religious or otherwise. Her amendment required 60 votes to move forward, and all but three Republicans voted against the measure.

In December 2018, Murray was one of 42 senators to sign a letter to Trump administration officials Alex Azar, Seema Verma, and Steven Mnuchin, arguing that the administration was improperly using Section 1332 of the Affordable Care Act to authorize states to "increase health care costs for millions of consumers, while weakening protections for individuals with pre-existing conditions". The senators requested the administration withdraw the policy and "re-engage with stakeholders, states, and Congress".

=== Labor ===
In July 2019, Murray signed a letter to Secretary of Labor Alexander Acosta that advocated that the Occupational Safety and Health Administration initiate a full investigation into a complaint filed on May 20 by a group of Chicago-area employees of McDonald's that detailed workplace violence incidents, including interactions with customers such as customers throwing hot coffee and threatening employees with firearms. The senators argued that McDonald's could and must "do more to protect its employees, but employers will not take seriously their obligations to provide a safe workplace if OSHA does not enforce workers rights to a hazard-free workplace".

In response to a February 2021 report by the Congressional Budget Office on the effects of a minimum wage increase, Murray said: "Today's report makes clear what we've known all along: raising the minimum wage — which hasn't increased since 2009 — to $15 an hour isn't just the right thing to do, it's good policy." She was among the 42 Democrats to vote unsuccessfully to include a federal raise of the minimum wage to $15 per hour in the American Rescue Plan Act of 2021.

=== LGBTQIA+ rights ===
In 1996, Murray voted for the Defense of Marriage Act, which banned federal recognition of same-sex marriage by limiting the definition of marriage to the union of a man and a woman. The Defense of Marriage Act was ruled unconstitutional in 2015, and later in 2023, she reversed her previous position and spoke in support of the Respect for Marriage Act, which officially repealed the Defense of Marriage Act.

In September 2014, Murray was one of 69 members of the House and Senate to sign a letter to Secretary of Health and Human Services Sylvia Burwell, requesting that the FDA revise its policy banning donation of corneas and other tissues by men who have had sex with another man in the preceding five years.

=== Opioids ===
In March 2017, Murray was one of 21 senators to sign a letter led by Ed Markey to Senate Majority Leader Mitch McConnell that noted that 12% of adult Medicaid beneficiaries had some form of substance abuse disorder, in addition to one third of treatment for opioid and other substance-use disorders in the United States being financed through Medicaid, and opined that the American Health Care Act could "very literally translate into a death spiral for those with opioid use disorders" due to the insurance coverage lacking adequate funds for care, often causing people to abandon treatment.

=== Veterans ===
In August 2013, Murray was one of 23 Democratic senators to sign a letter to the Department of Defense, warning of some payday lenders "offering predatory loan products to service members at exorbitant triple digit effective interest rates and loan products that do not include the additional protections envisioned by the law", and asserting that service members, along with their families, "deserve the strongest possible protections and swift action to ensure that all forms of credit offered to members of our armed forces are safe and sound".

In December 2018, Murray was one of 21 senators to sign a letter to Secretary of Veterans Affairs Robert Wilkie, calling it "appalling that the VA is not conducting oversight of its own outreach efforts", in spite of suicide prevention being the VA's highest clinical priority, and requesting Wilkie "consult with experts with proven track records of successful public and mental health outreach campaigns, with a particular emphasis on how those individuals measure success".

=== Gun control ===
Murray supports gun control. She also supports a national assault weapons ban.

=== Immigration ===
Patty Murray has voted on many Immigration acts during her time in the US senate. Most recently, she voted against the Nomination of Joseph Edlow as the Director of U.S. Citizenship and Immigration Services. Some other notable acts she had voted for include: the Border Act of 2024, and the 2019 Appropriations for Humanitarian Assistance and Security at the Southern Border Act. In 2021, she voted against the Stop Dangerous Sanctuary Cities Act. In 2025, Murray wrote a letter to ICE Director Todd Lyons that cites explicit concerns about the treatment of immigrants at the Tacoma detention center.

=== Other positions ===
In May 2006, Murray, along with 38 of 44 Senate Democrats, voted in favor of the Comprehensive Immigration Reform Act of 2006 (S. 2611). The bill includes provisions to improve border security, increases fines and other punishments for employers of illegal immigrants, and creates a guest worker program (which includes an almost doubling of the number of H-1B visas) and a path to citizenship for illegal immigrants already in the country. The bill, with support from some in the GOP leadership, passed 62–36.

Murray repeatedly cosponsored legislation to create the Wild Sky Wilderness area in the Washington Cascade Range. She eventually succeeded, with the bill signed by President George W. Bush on May 8, 2008. Murray has also supported legislation to increase the size of the Alpine Lakes Wilderness, also in the Washington Cascades.

Murray introduced a bill in January 2014, proposing that an additional 126,554 acres (51,215 ha) (20%) of the Olympic National Forest's lands would be disallowed under the creation of nine new wilderness areas and expansion of the five existing ones. Wild and Scenic River designations would extend to 19 rivers, including those originating in the Olympic National Park, such as the Quinault River, Hoh River, Elwha River, and Hamma Hamma River, and some that do not, like the middle fork of the Satsop River. According to the bill, "the wilderness designation would permanently protect old growth and ancient forest habitat throughout the region. The wild and scenic rivers designation would add federal recognition to the outstanding river systems on the peninsula, protecting them as a source of clean drinking water and helping to keep Puget Sound clean for generations. This designation does not restrict private property rights."

On January 30, 2008, Murray endorsed Hillary Clinton in the 2008 Democratic presidential primaries. One month later, the Washington Democratic caucus awarded two-thirds of its delegates to Barack Obama and one-third to Clinton. After Clinton's June 7 concession, Murray endorsed Obama.

On May 28, 2021, Murray abstained from voting on the creation of the January 6 commission. She cited a "personal family matter" for the abstention. Murray had expressed support for the commission and had talked about her experience on the day of the demonstration.

== Electoral history ==
Washington State Senate District 1 election, 1988
Party	Candidate	Votes	%	±%
Democratic	Patty Murray	21,295	54%	
Republican	Bill Kiskaddon (inc.)	18,497	46%	

U.S. senator from Washington (Class III) results: 1992–2022
Year	Democratic	Votes	Percentage	Republican	Votes	Percentage	Third Party	Party	Votes	Percentage	Third Party	Party	Votes	Percentage
1992	Patty Murray	1,197,973	54%	Rod Chandler	1,020,829	46%								
1998	Patty Murray (incumbent)	1,103,184	58%	Linda Smith	785,377	42%								
2004	Patty Murray (incumbent)	1,549,708	55%	George Nethercutt	1,204,584	43%	J. Mills	Libertarian	34,055	1%	Mark B. Wilson	Green	30,304	1%
2010	Patty Murray (incumbent)	1,314,930	52%	Dino Rossi	1,196,164	48%								
2016	Patty Murray (incumbent)	1,913,979	59%	Chris Vance	1,329,338	41%								
2022	Patty Murray (incumbent)	1,741,827	57%	Tiffany Smiley	1,299,322	43%								

== Personal life ==
Murray is married to Rob Murray and has two grown children: Sara and Randy. She lives in Seattle.

On August 2, 2006, The New York Times wrote that in 1994, Senator Strom Thurmond of South Carolina attempted to grope his then-freshman colleague Patty Murray of Washington. The Seattle Post-Intelligencer reported that Murray asked for, and received, an apology. Through a spokeswoman, Murray declined to comment further on the incident.

== See also ==
- Women in the United States Senate

Party political offices
Preceded by Brock Adams	Democratic nominee for U.S. Senator from Washington (Class 3); 1992, 1998, 2004, 2010, 2016, 2022	Most recent
Preceded by Robert Torricelli	Chair of the Democratic Senatorial Campaign Committee; 2001–2003	Succeeded by Jon Corzine
Preceded by Debbie Stabenow	Secretary of the Senate Democratic Conference; 2007–2017	Succeeded by Tammy Baldwin
Preceded by Bob Menendez	Chair of the Democratic Senatorial Campaign Committee; 2011–2013	Succeeded by Michael Bennet
New office	Senate Assistant Democratic Leader; 2017–2023	Succeeded by Position abolished
U.S. Senate
Preceded by Brock Adams	United States Senator (Class 3) from Washington; 1993–present Served alongside: Slade Gorton, Maria Cantwell	Incumbent
Preceded by Daniel Akaka	Chair of the Senate Veterans' Affairs Committee; 2011–2013	Succeeded by Bernie Sanders
New office	Chair of the Joint Deficit Reduction Committee; 2011–2012	Position abolished
Preceded by Kent Conrad	Chair of the Senate Budget Committee; 2013–2015	Succeeded by Mike Enzi
Preceded by Lamar Alexander	Ranking Member of the Senate Health Committee; 2015–2021	Succeeded by Richard Burr
Preceded by Lamar Alexander	Chair of the Senate Health Committee; 2021–2023	Succeeded by Bernie Sanders
Preceded by Patrick Leahy	Chair of the Senate Appropriations Committee; 2023–2025	Succeeded by Susan Collins
Preceded by Susan Collins	Ranking Member of the Senate Appropriations Committee; 2025–present	Incumbent
Political offices
Preceded by Patrick Leahy	President pro tempore of the U.S. Senate; 2023–2025	Succeeded by Chuck Grassley
Honorary titles
Preceded by Dianne Feinstein	Most senior Democrat in the U.S. Senate; 2023–present	Incumbent
U.S. order of precedence (ceremonial)
Preceded by Mitch McConnell	United States senators by seniority 3rd	Succeeded by Ron Wyden
