= Patty Butler =

American politician

Member of the Washington House of Representatives from the District 32 district
- In office 1997–1999

Personal details
- Born: March 20, 1952 (age 74)
- Party: Democratic

Patty Butler (born March 20, 1952) is an American politician. She was a Democrat, representing District 32 in the Washington House of Representatives which included parts of King County, from 1997 to 1999. She was a candidate for District 32 for the Washington State Senate in the 2010 Washington State Senate election.
