= Bill Kiskaddon =

American politician (1929–2015)

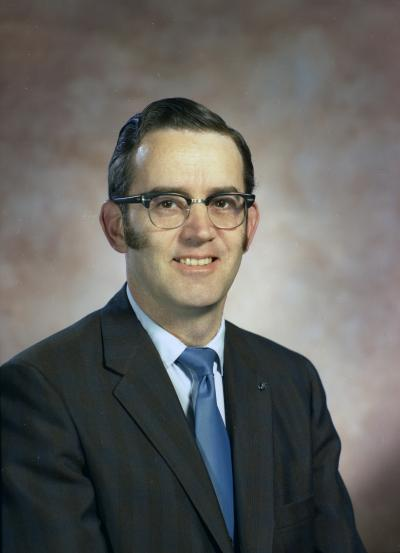
- Kiskaddon in 1971

Member of the Washington Senate from the 1st district
- In office January 12, 1981 – January 9, 1989
- Preceded by: Ray Van Hollebeke
- Succeeded by: Patty Murray

Member of the Washington House of Representatives from the 21st district
- In office January 9, 1967 – January 8, 1973
- Preceded by: Jack Burtch
- Succeeded by: Gary A. Nelson

Personal details
- Born: December 14, 1929 Whittier, California, United States
- Died: December 3, 2015 (aged 85) Washington, United States
- Party: Republican
- Occupation: Engineer, social worker

William V. Kiskaddon (December 14, 1929 – December 3, 2015) was an American politician, social worker, and engineer who served in the Washington House of Representatives and Washington State Senate as a Republican. He was an engineer for Boeing. Kiskaddon died in 2015, aged 85.
