= Patricia Scott (politician) =

Washington State politician

Patricia D. "Pat" Scott

Member of the Washington House of Representatives from the 38th district
- In office January 4, 1984 (appointed) – January 7, 2001 (deceased)
- Preceded by: John Martinis
- Succeeded by: Jean Berkey

Personal details
- Born: Minnesota, U.S.
- Died: January 7, 2001 Everett, Washington, U.S.
- Party: Democratic
- Occupation: Transportation community / customer relations officer; administrative aide to police chief

Patricia D. "Pat" Scott (died January 7, 2001) was an American politician who served as a member of the Washington House of Representatives from 1984 to 2001. First appointed to office upon the resignation of John Martinis, she represented Washington's 28th legislative district as a Democrat for 17 years until her death in 2001.

Her death, along with the surprise resignation of Republican Renee Radcliff, set up two special elections for seats in Snohomish County. Democrats won both seats, breaking a tie in the chamber and resulting in a 50-48 Democratic majority that elected Frank Chopp as sole Speaker of the House.
