= Renee Radcliff =

American politician

Member of the Washington House of Representatives from the 21st district
- In office January 9, 1995 – January 10, 2001 (resigned)
- Preceded by: Paull Shin
- Succeeded by: Joe Marine

Personal details
- Born: 1959 (age 66–67) Oregon, U.S.
- Party: Republican
- Education: Pacific Union College (B.S.); Almeda College and University (B.S.)
- Occupation: Writer and editor

Renee Radcliff (born 1959) is a former American politician who served as a member of the Washington House of Representatives from 1995 to 2001. She represented Washington's 21st legislative district as a Republican.

She surprised colleagues by resigning mid-term in 2001, setting up one of two special elections for seats in Snohomish County, the other being vacated by the death of Democrat Patricia Scott. Democrats won both seats, breaking a tie in the chamber and resulting in a 50–48 Democratic majority that elected Frank Chopp as sole Speaker of the House.
