= John Martinis (politician) =

American politician

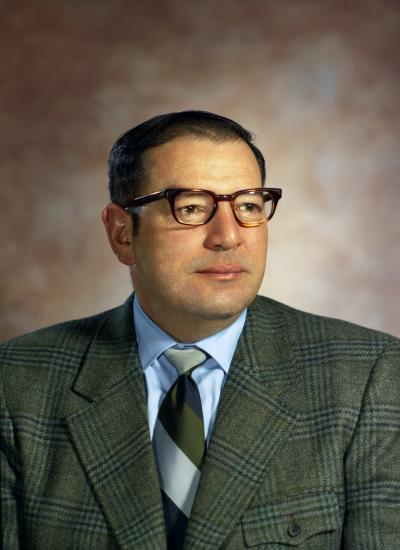
- Martinis in 1971

Member of the Washington House of Representatives for the 38th district
- In office 1969–1984
- Succeeded by: Patricia Scott

Personal details
- Born: June 4, 1930 Everett, Washington, United States
- Died: January 29, 2013 (aged 82) Anacortes, Washington, United States
- Party: Democratic

John Martinis (June 4, 1930 – January 29, 2013) was an American politician in the state of Washington. He served in the Washington House of Representatives from 1969 to 1984 for district 38.
