= Jack Burtch =

American politician

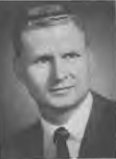

Member of the Washington House of Representatives for the 21st district
- In office 1961–1967
- Succeeded by: Bill Kiskaddon

Personal details
- Born: Jack Lee Burtch; May 11, 1926 Portland, Oregon, U.S.
- Died: August 29, 2015 (aged 89) Aberdeen, Washington, U.S.
- Party: Democratic
- Children: 3
- Education: Whitman College (BA); University of Washington (JD)
- Occupation: Lawyer

Military service
- Allegiance: United States
- Branch/service: United States Navy
- Years of service: 1943–1946
- Battles/wars: World War II

Jack Lee Burtch (May 11, 1926 – August 29, 2015) was an American lawyer, World War II veteran and politician, who served three terms in the Washington House of Representatives.

== Early life ==
Jack Burtch was born in Portland, Oregon in 1926. He eventually moved to Aberdeen, Washington, where he attended Weatherwax High School. After high school, he served in the Asiatic-Pacific Theater for the United States Navy from 1943 to 1946.

== Education and professional career ==
Following his service in the United States Navy, Burtch attended Whitman College in Walla Walla, Washington where he received his Bachelor of Arts (BA) degree in Political Science. While residing in Walla Walla, he worked as a prison guard at the Washington State Penitentiary. Burtch then attended law school at the University of Washington, receiving his Juris Doctor (JD) in 1955. During the same year as receiving his JD, Burtch opened his own private law practice in Aberdeen, Washington. His law practice would go on to last for over 50 years.

During his practice of law, Burtch focused his practice on criminal laws, civil rights and police misconduct. From 1955 to 1960, he was a part-time Deputy Prosecuting Attorney for Grays Harbor County. He also worked to found the mental health program and treatment for low-income citizens of Grays Harbor County, which is now the Grays Harbor County Public Health & Social Services Department.

== Political career ==
After operating his law practice for a few years, Burtch felt compelled to serve as a state representative for his home district (at the time, this was the 21st District or Grays Harbor County). He was elected to three straight terms where he served in the Washington House of Representatives from 1961 to 1967. During this time, he served as Assistant Floor Leader and member of the Executive Committee Legislative Council.

== Later life and death ==
In 1967, Burtch's representative district was re-aligned by the state of Washington. At this point, Jack Burtch returned to practicing law full-time as a defense attorney until his disbarment in 2008. In 2013, Burtch was a member of the Honor Flight to Washington D.C., where he toured the war memorials and enjoyed the camaraderie of his fellow service members. Jack Burtch died in 2015, and was survived by his three children and four grandchildren.
