= Paull Shin =

American politician and educator (1935–2021)

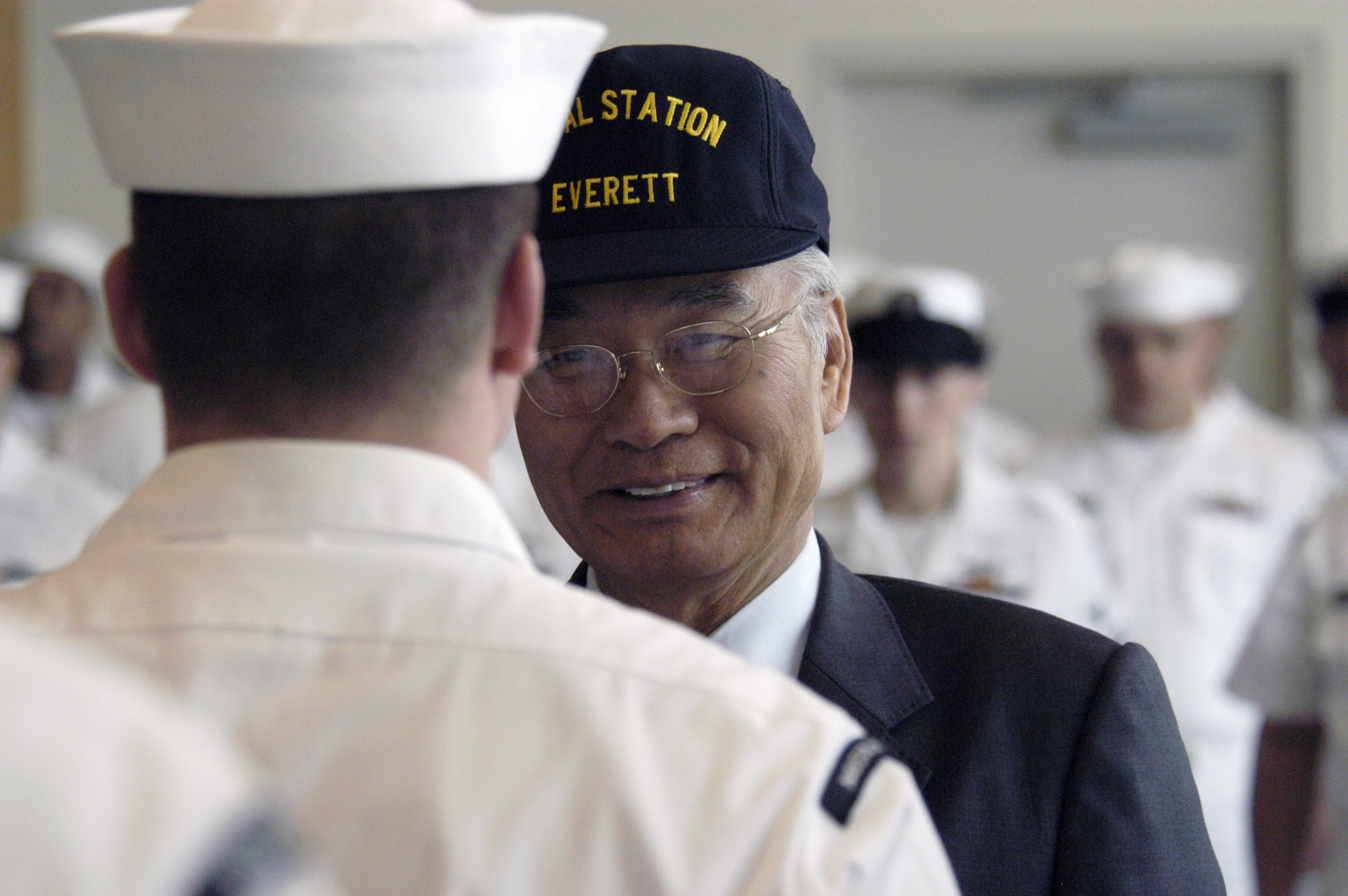
- Shin attending a uniform inspection in 2004

Member of the Washington Senate from the 21st district
- In office January 11, 1999 – January 7, 2014
- Preceded by: Jeannette Wood
- Succeeded by: Marko Liias

Member of the Washington House of Representatives from the 21st district
- In office January 11, 1993 – January 9, 1995
- Preceded by: John Beck
- Succeeded by: Renee Radcliff

Personal details
- Born: Shin Hobom; September 27, 1935 Paju, Korea, Empire of Japan
- Died: April 12, 2021 (aged 85) Edmonds, Washington, U.S.
- Party: Democratic
- Spouse: Donna June Skaggs
- Children: 2
- Education: Brigham Young University (BA); University of Pittsburgh (MA); University of Washington (PhD)
- Profession: Professor
- Website: Official

Paull Hobom Shin (Korean name Shin Hobom; 신호범; September 27, 1935 – April 12, 2021) was an American politician and educator who served as a member of the Washington State Senate, the first Korean American ever elected to the Washington State Legislature. Shin was a member of the Democratic Party, elected from the 21st Legislative District, in southwest Snohomish County. Cities within the district include Mukilteo and portions of Everett, Edmonds, and Lynnwood. Senator Shin served on the Senate Agriculture, Water & Rural Economic Development and Trade & Economic Development Committees.

== Early life and education ==
Shin was born in Korea in 1935. Orphaned at the age of four, he lived on the streets of Seoul begging for food until the outbreak of the Korean War in 1950, at which point he became a houseboy to a group of U.S. Army officers. In 1954, one of them, a dentist named Ray Paull, adopted Shin and took him home to Salt Lake City, Utah. Despite never having been educated in Korea, and knowing little English, Shin completed a GED in 18 months. Shin went on to earn a BA in political science from Brigham Young University, an MPIA from the University of Pittsburgh, and an MA and PhD from the University of Washington.

== Political career ==
After being elected to the Washington State House of Representatives in 1992, Shin ran for the United States House of Representatives in Washington's 2nd district in 1994 and for Washington lieutenant governor in 1996, losing by a narrow margin in each race. He was elected to the Washington State Senate in 1998.

On January 7, 2014, Shin resigned from the Washington State Senate effective immediately following his diagnosis with Alzheimer's disease.

== Death ==
Shin died on April 12, 2021, in Edmonds, Washington, at the age of 85.
