= 2004 Washington Initiative 872 =

Referendum on the primary election system

Initiative 872
- Washington Blanket Primary Initiative

Results
Choice	Votes	%
Yes	1,632,225	59.85%
No	1,095,190	40.15%
Total votes	2,727,415	100.00%
County results
Yes:
50–60%
60–70%
70–80%

Initiative 872 was a 2004 ballot initiative that replaced the open primary being used in Washington state with a top-two nonpartisan blanket primary. It was challenged in court up to the US Supreme Court, which upheld the top-two primary in Washington State Grange v. Washington State Republican Party.

== Background ==
The blanket primary in Washington State was started by an Initiative to the Legislature filed in 1934 and passed in 1935. The political parties in Washington tried numerous times to have an open or closed primary system implemented, and it even filed a lawsuit that was decided by the Washington State Supreme Court in 1936. The state was represented in that lawsuit by Warren Magnuson.

The political parties in Washington State filed another lawsuit against it in 2000 when the blanket primary in California was overturned by California Democratic Party v. Jones and won the case.

The Washington State Legislature passed a new primary system in 2004, which would have created a new top-two primary system, with an open primary as a backup, giving the governor the option to choose. Secretary of State Sam Reed advocated for the top-two, but on April 1, 2004, the Governor used the line-item veto to activate the open primary instead.

== 2004 campaign ==
Initiative 872 was filed on January 8, 2004, by Terry Hunt from the Washington Grange. The language of the ballot measure summary was as follows:

This measure proposes a new system for conducting primaries for partisan offices. This proposal continues current practice of permitting voters to vote for any candidate for any office in primary and general elections, without limitation based on party. The two "top" candidates with the most votes in the primary advance to the general election. Candidates continue to designate their party. It becomes effective only if the court decision invalidating the traditional blanket primary becomes final.

The political parties in Washington opposed I-872 because they felt it would create an opportunity for someone not directly associated with the party to claim the party name on the ballot.

The measure passed with 1,632,225 yes votes and 1,095,190 no votes in 2004.

== Results ==
2004 Washington Initiative 872
Choice	Votes	%
For	1,632,225	59.85
Against	1,095,190	40.15
Total	2,727,415	100.00
Source: Washington Secretary of State

=== By county ===
County results
County	Yes		No		Margin		Total votes
County	#	%	#	%	#	%	Total votes
Adams	3,365	69.11%	1,504	30.89%	1,861	38.22%	4,869
Asotin	5,385	64.28%	2,993	35.72%	2,392	28.55%	8,378
Benton	39,745	62.12%	24,233	37.88%	15,512	24.25%	63,978
Chelan	18,339	64.84%	9,946	35.16%	8,393	29.67%	28,285
Clallam	21,344	61.26%	13,495	38.74%	7,849	22.53%	34,839
Clark	93,703	59.56%	63,618	40.44%	30,085	19.12%	157,321
Columbia	1,410	69.08%	631	30.92%	779	38.17%	2,041
Cowlitz	27,553	67.87%	13,044	32.13%	14,509	35.74%	40,597
Douglas	8,355	65.20%	4,460	34.80%	3,895	30.39%	12,815
Ferry	2,150	66.48%	1,084	33.52%	1,066	32.96%	3,234
Franklin	10,413	66.39%	5,271	33.61%	5,142	32.79%	15,684
Garfield	760	61.19%	482	38.81%	278	22.38%	1,242
Grant	16,235	65.42%	8,581	34.58%	7,654	30.84%	24,816
Grays Harbor	19,501	72.04%	7,570	27.96%	11,931	44.07%	27,071
Island	21,533	58.94%	15,002	41.06%	6,531	17.88%	36,535
Jefferson	10,273	57.26%	7,667	42.74%	2,606	14.53%	17,940
King	467,015	54.88%	383,913	45.12%	83,102	9.77%	850,928
Kitsap	68,267	59.34%	46,779	40.66%	21,488	18.68%	115,046
Kittitas	9,813	63.47%	5,649	36.53%	4,164	26.93%	15,462
Klickitat	5,068	57.45%	3,754	42.55%	1,314	14.89%	8,822
Lewis	19,654	63.84%	11,131	36.16%	8,523	27.69%	30,785
Lincoln	3,545	64.95%	1,913	35.05%	1,632	29.90%	5,458
Mason	16,002	65.68%	8,360	34.32%	7,642	31.37%	24,362
Okanogan	9,795	63.26%	5,689	36.74%	4,106	26.52%	15,484
Pacific	6,549	66.35%	3,322	33.65%	3,227	32.69%	9,871
Pend Oreille	3,958	66.47%	1,997	33.53%	1,961	32.93%	5,955
Pierce	185,586	62.19%	112,852	37.81%	72,734	24.37%	298,438
San Juan	5,082	52.74%	4,554	47.26%	528	5.48%	9,636
Skagit	29,953	59.46%	20,418	40.54%	9,535	18.93%	50,371
Skamania	2,960	60.83%	1,906	39.17%	1,054	21.66%	4,866
Snohomish	171,974	60.64%	111,603	39.36%	60,371	21.29%	283,577
Spokane	126,174	64.11%	70,630	35.89%	55,544	28.22%	196,804
Stevens	12,331	63.75%	7,011	36.25%	5,320	27.50%	19,342
Thurston	65,193	60.73%	42,155	39.27%	23,038	21.46%	107,348
Wahkiakum	1,525	72.04%	592	27.96%	933	44.07%	2,117
Walla Walla	14,133	64.88%	7,650	35.12%	6,483	29.76%	21,783
Whatcom	50,171	59.67%	33,913	40.33%	16,258	19.34%	84,084
Whitman	9,849	57.88%	7,168	42.12%	2,681	15.75%	17,017
Yakima	47,564	67.74%	22,650	32.26%	24,914	35.48%	70,214
Totals	1,632,225	59.85%	1,095,190	40.15%	537,035	19.69%	2,727,415

== More lawsuits ==
On July 15, 2005, the initiative 872 was declared unconstitutional by the Ninth Circuit Court of Appeals.

On March 18, 2008, the US Supreme Court reversed the decision and upheld 872.

== Top two primary implementation ==
The decision to uphold 872 changed the implementation of the 2008 primary election, which was held on August 19.

=== 2008 election ===
In 2008, two State Senate races and five House of Representatives elections had either two Democrats or two Republicans get through the primary election, appearing together on the general election ballot.

The results of a study from Gonzaga University comparing the results in Washington state between the 2004 (closed) and 2008 (top two) primaries, indicate that the top two primary overall reduced the likelihood of running against a same party candidate and it reduced the likelihood that a strong incumbent would face a challenger from his or her own party.
