= Blanket primary =

System for selecting candidates in a primary election

The blanket primary is a system used for selecting political party candidates in a primary election, used in Argentina and historically in the United States. In a blanket primary, voters may pick one candidate for each office without regard to party lines; for instance, a voter might select a Democratic candidate for governor and a Republican candidate for senator. In a traditional blanket primary the candidates with the highest number of votes for each office in each party advance to the general election, as the respective party's nominee. Blanket primaries differ from open primaries – in open primaries voters may pick candidates regardless of their own party registration, but may only choose among candidates from a single party of the voter's choice. A blanket primary gives registered voters maximum choice in selecting candidates among those systems that separate primary from general elections. Blanket primary elections also serve as polls for the general elections, revealing the portion of votes that the candidates are expected to receive in them.

== Comparison ==
Compared to other primary systems, the blanket primary is less restrictive for voters because it does not limit them to selecting from only one party's candidates. Mainstream political parties, however, may see this as a disadvantage because it discourages party loyalty, especially among moderate voters who do not identify strongly with any party. The system also has potential for tactical voting: Voters opposed to one party might disingenuously choose a weaker candidate from that party, setting the candidate up to lose in the general election.

== Argentina ==
See also: Primary elections in Argentina, es:Elecciones primarias en Argentina

In Argentina, nationwide blanket primaries, called PASO (Spanish: Primarias Abiertas Simultáneas y Obligatorias, meaning "Simultaneous and mandatory open primaries"), were established for presidential and legislative elections in 2009 by Law 26,571.

All parties must take part in these blanket primaries, including both parties with internal factions and parties with a single candidate list. Citizens may vote for any candidate of any party, but may only cast a single vote for each office.

Parties must also get 1.5% or higher of the vote to be allowed to run in the general election. Furthermore, each party should have at least a membership of 0.4% of the electoral roll of its respective district to continue operating. In 2011, 149 minor parties were either closed, or were not allowed to run in specific provinces where they did not meet the requirements. This was rejected by the small opposition parties, which charged that these reforms could stymy minor parties and the formation of new ones.

Private funding for political campaigns is not allowed. All parties are granted free airtime during the political campaign to advertisements of a fixed time duration.

The most recent exercise was the 2023 Argentine primary elections.

== United States ==
In 2000 the Supreme Court of the United States struck down California's blanket primary in California Democratic Party v. Jones. Similar systems used by Washington and Alaska were also struck down in subsequent Supreme Court cases.

The blanket primary survives in a different form, known as the jungle primary, in California, Washington, and Alaska. In response to the aforementioned Supreme Court decision, Washington state voters passed Initiative 872 in 2004 to adopt a "top two" jungle primary; while lower courts, following the ruling in California Democratic Party v. Jones, struck down the initiative, the Supreme Court ruled on March 18, 2008 in Washington State Grange v. Washington State Republican Party et al. that Initiative 872 was at least facially constitutional and could go into effect.
