= Jean Berkey =

Former Washington state senator

Member of the Washington State Senate from the 38th district
- In office January 4, 2004 – January 10, 2011
- Preceded by: Aaron Reardon
- Succeeded by: Nick Harper

Member of the Washington House of Representatives from the 38th district
- In office January 25, 2001 – January 4, 2004
- Preceded by: Patricia Scott (deceased)
- Succeeded by: David Simpson

Personal details
- Born: Jean Louise Haskell; August 22, 1938 Loma Linda, California
- Died: August 21, 2013 (aged 74) Fidalgo Island, Washington

Jean Louise Berkey (née Haskell; August 22, 1938 – August 21, 2013) was an American politician who served as a Washington State Senator from Washington's 38th legislative district from 2005 to 2011. Her career ended due to the Moxie Media scandal: in the 2010 primary election, her fellow Democrat, Nick Harper, bankrolled ads for a third candidate in an effort to "Squeeze The Middle" and prevent the moderate incumbent Berkey from running in the general election. The state's election watchdog committee unanimously voted to refer the case to the state Attorney General Rob McKenna, who promptly "filed suit, alleging multiple campaign-finance violations." Berkey placed third in the primary, and despite a call several former state senators to hold another election, was prevented from running in the general election per Washington state's 'top two' primary system. Her term ended in January 2011.

== Political career ==
Berkey represented the 38th Legislative District for five years, first as representative and then as senator. The district includes Everett and Marysville. Berkey had been active in political and community activities in Snohomish County, Washington – serving as board member for a number of organizations including the Everett Senior Center, the Everett Medic One Foundation, United Way and the Everett Community College Board of Trustees.

Berkey served as the vice-chair for both the Financial Institutions, Insurance & Consumer Protection Committee and the Government Operations & Elections Committee, and a member of the Early Education, K-12 and Higher Education Committee.

In 2009, Berkey became the recipient of a Fuse "Fizzle" Award. Fuse's Sizzle (thumbs up) and Fizzle (thumbs down) awards program is aimed at promoting leadership and accountability in the Washington State Legislature.

== Personal life ==
Born in Loma Linda, California on August 22, 1938, Berkey moved to Everett, Washington with her family when she was nine years old. She graduated from Everett High School and received an associate degree from Everett Community College. Berkey then received a BA in business from the University of Washington. Berkey worked at the General Telephone Company and was active in her labor union and in Democratic politics. Berkey and her husband Don lived in Everett for over 30 years. Berkey died at home on Fidalgo Island on August 21, 2013, the day before her 75th birthday.
