= California Democratic Party v. Jones =

- Supreme Court of the United States

Argued April 24, 2000 Decided June 26, 2000
- Full case name: California Democratic Party, et al. v. Bill Jones, Secretary of State of California, et al.
- Citations: 530 U.S. 567 (more) 120 S. Ct. 2402; 147 L. Ed. 2d 502; 2000 U.S. LEXIS 4303; 68 U.S.L.W. 4604; 2000 Cal. Daily Op. Service 5083; 2000 Daily Journal DAR 6777; 2000 Colo. J. C.A.R. 3867; 13 Fla. L. Weekly Fed. S 479

Case history
- Prior: 984 F. Supp. 1288 (E.D. Cal. 1997), aff'd, 169 F.3d 646 (9th Cir. 1999); cert. granted, 528 U.S. 1133 (2000).
- Subsequent: On remand, 242 F.3d 1201 (9th Cir. 2001).

Holding
- The Court held that California's blanket primary violates a political party's First Amendment freedom of association.

Court membership
- Chief Justice William Rehnquist Associate Justices John P. Stevens · Sandra Day O'Connor; Antonin Scalia · Anthony Kennedy; David Souter · Clarence Thomas; Ruth Bader Ginsburg · Stephen Breyer

Case opinions
- Majority: Scalia, joined by Rehnquist, O'Connor, Kennedy, Souter, Thomas, Breyer
- Concurrence: Kennedy
- Dissent: Stevens, joined by Ginsburg (part I)

Laws applied
- California's prop. 198

California Democratic Party v. Jones, 530 U.S. 567 (2000), was a case in which the United States Supreme Court held that California's blanket primary violates a political party's First Amendment freedom of association.

== Prior history ==
In California, candidates for public office could gain access to the general ballot by winning a qualified political party's primary. In 1996, voter-approved Proposition 198 changed California's partisan primary from a closed primary, in which only a political party's members can vote on its nominees, to a blanket primary, in which each voter's ballot lists every candidate regardless of party affiliation and allows the voter to choose freely among them. The candidate of each party who wins the most votes is that party's nominee for the general election.

A blanket primary differs from an open primary in that in an open primary, even though voters are not required to declare party affiliation and are given a ballot listing all candidates of all parties, the voter is restricted to voting for the candidates of only one party for all races on the ballot. In a blanket primary, the voter is free to cross party lines from one race to the next.

The California Democratic Party, the California Republican Party, the Libertarian Party of California, and the Peace and Freedom Party have historically prohibited nonmembers from voting in their party's primary. Each political party filed suit against Bill Jones, the California Secretary of State, alleging that the blanket primary violated their First Amendment right of association. Jones countered that a blanket primary will intensify the election and allow for better representation in elected office. Siding with Jones, District Judge David F. Levi held that the primary's burden on the parties' associational rights was not severe and was justified by substantial state interests. The Court of Appeals affirmed.

== Supreme Court ==
California Democratic Party v. Jones presented the following question: "Does California's voter-approved Proposition 198, which changes its partisan primary from a closed primary to a blanket primary, violate political parties' First Amendment right of association?"

In a 7–2 opinion delivered by Justice Antonin Scalia, the Court held that California's blanket primary violated a political party's First Amendment right of association. For the majority, Justice Scalia wrote that "Proposition 198 forces political parties to associate with—to have their nominees, and hence their positions, determined by—those who, at best, have refused to affiliate with the party, and, at worst, have expressly affiliated with a rival." He added: "A single election in which the party nominee is selected by nonparty members could be enough to destroy the party." Justice Scalia went on to state for the Court that Proposition 198 takes away a party's "basic function" to choose its own leaders and is functionally "both severe and unnecessary."

Justices John Paul Stevens and Ruth Bader Ginsburg dissented. Stevens wrote: "This Court's willingness to invalidate the primary schemes of 3 States and cast serious constitutional doubt on the schemes of 29 others at the parties' behest is an extraordinary intrusion into the complex and changing election laws of the States."

== See also ==
- Nonpartisan blanket primary
- Washington State Grange v. Washington State Republican Party
