= Nick Harper (politician) =

American politician

Member of the Washington Senate from the 38th district
- In office January 10, 2011 – November 9, 2013
- Preceded by: Jean Berkey
- Succeeded by: John McCoy

Personal details
- Born: 1979 (age 46–47)
- Party: Democratic
- Spouse: Lacey Harper
- Children: 2
- Education: University of Washington (BA); Seattle University (JD)
- Website: Campaign website

Nick Harper (born 1979) is an American lawyer and politician of the Democratic Party. In 2010 he was elected to the Washington State Senate representing Legislative District 38 in a controversial contest that led to the Moxie Media scandal. Before his term was finished, he abruptly resigned his seat following rumors of an extramarital affair with a lobbyist. He subsequently was named deputy mayor of Everett, Washington, where he was under investigation over the nature of his personal relationship with the mayor.

== Early life and education ==
A native of Port Townsend, Washington, Harper received a B.A. degree in political science from the University of Washington in 2001. At the University of Washington he was initiated into the Delta Upsilon fraternity. In 2004 he earned a J.D. from Seattle University.

== Career ==
=== Legal and lobbying work ===
After his admission to the Washington State Bar, Harper worked for several law firms, and briefly served as governmental affairs director for the Snohomish County-Camano Island Association of Realtors. He was a field director for congressman Rick Larsen's 2006 reelection campaign.

=== Washington State Senate ===
Harper was elected to the Washington state senate in 2010 by defeating incumbent Democratic senator Jean Berkey in a controversial contest that led to the Moxie Media scandal. The scandal involved a campaign by Harper's supporters to funnel $300,000 to a variety of shell PAC's that was used to covertly assist an unknown third-party candidate, helping eliminate Berkey from advancing to the general election. Harper denied any knowledge of the scheme and, despite efforts by some from within his own party to stop his seating, was sworn into the senate in January 2011.

In September 2013 the Washington state Democratic Party named Harper its "Male Elected Official of the Year." Two months later, however, Harper abruptly resigned, following rumors he had been involved in an extramarital affair with a lobbyist. Harper said his resignation was motivated by a desire to spend more time with his family.

=== Seattle director of intergovernmental relations ===
In December 2013, the month following his resignation from the state senate, Harper was appointed director of intergovernmental relations for the City of Seattle by newly elected mayor Ed Murray, a former senate colleague, in which capacity he operated as the city's lobbyist to the Washington State Legislature. In June 2016, after Murray failed to get state legislative support for tax incentives for landlords, it was announced Harper was leaving his post, with Seattle Met noting at the time that "staff 'changes' typically follow Murray’s defeats".

=== Master Builders Association ===
Harper joined the Master Builders Association of King and Snohomish Counties as its director of governmental affairs in the summer of 2016.

=== Everett deputy mayor ===
In December 2017, Harper was designated deputy mayor of Everett, Washington by Mayor-Elect Cassie Franklin, and assumed office in 2018. In February 2023, the Everett city council retained the services of outside investigators to launch an inquiry into the nature of the relationship between Harper and Franklin, though Franklin dismissed the investigation, observing that "no city policies would be broken if I were to be in a consensual relationship with a city employee".

== Personal life ==
Harper is married. With his wife, Lacey, he has two daughters.
