= 2000 Washington Secretary of State election =

- November 7, 2000
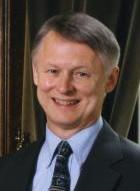

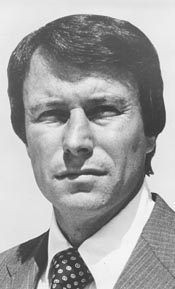
Nominee	Sam Reed	Don Bonker
Party	Republican	Democratic
Popular vote	1,073,911	1,063,689
Percentage	47.08%	46.63%
- County results Reed: 40–50% 50–60% 60–70% Bonker: 40–50% 50–60%
Secretary of State before election
Ralph Munro
Republican
Elected Secretary of State
Sam Reed
Republican

The 2000 Washington Secretary of State election took place on November 7, 2000. Republican Sam Reed was elected to succeed retiring incumbent Ralph Munro.

== Primary election ==
The primary election took place in September.

Leading contenders for the Republican nomination were Thurston County Auditor Sam Reed and Mike Wensman, a member of the Washington House of Representatives. Perennial candidate Will Baker and political newcomer James Findley of Wilkeson also sought the GOP nomination. During the primary contest Wensman, who was independently wealthy and largely self-financed his campaign, purchased television ads, marking the first time TV advertising had been used in a secretary of state race in the history of Washington. Nonetheless, Sam Reed - who had been endorsed by the outgoing Munro - coasted to victory in the primary.

The Democratic nomination was sought by Washington State Democratic Party chairman Charles Rolland, former member of the U.S. House of Representatives Don Bonker, and Snohomish County Auditor Bob Terwilliger. Allen Norman of Seattle and Rand Daley of Olympia also vied for the nomination, which was ultimately won by Bonker.

J. Bradley Gibson and Chris Loftis faced no opposition in their primary election contests as candidates of the Libertarian Party and Reform Party, respectively.

=== Results ===
Results by county Reed: 10–20%; 20–30%; 30–40%; 50–60%; Bonker: 10–20%; 20–30%; 30–40%; 40–50%; Terwilliger: 30–40%

Blanket primary results
Party	Candidate	Votes	%
Republican	Sam Reed	248,742	21.99
Democratic	Don Bonker	239,843	21.20
Democratic	Bob Terwilliger	140,766	12.44
Republican	Mike Wensman	109,585	9.69
Republican	James Findley	91,885	8.12
Democratic	Charles Rolland	86,315	7.63
Republican	Will Baker	57,649	5.10
Democratic	Rand Daley	48,342	4.27
Democratic	Allen Norman	44,896	3.97
Libertarian	J. Bradley Gibson	38,121	3.37
Reform	Chris Loftis	25,022	2.21
Total votes		1,131,166	100.00

== General election ==
The general election was a close race, with Reed only eking out a victory over Bonker, despite outspending his opponent by a factor of nearly four to one. It was the ninth consecutive election for Washington secretary of state won by Republicans in the Democratic-leaning state.

=== Results ===
2000 Washington Secretary of State election
Party	Candidate	Votes	%	±%
Republican	Sam Reed	1,073,911	47.08%	–10.22%
Democratic	Don Bonker	1,063,689	46.63%	+7.36%
Libertarian	J. Bradley Gibson	94,202	4.13%	N/A
Reform	Chris Loftis	49,417	2.17%	N/A
Total votes		2,281,219	100.00%	N/A
Republican hold				

==== By county ====
County results
County	Sam Reed Republican		Don Bonker Democratic		Various candidates Other parties		Margin		Total votes
County	#	%	#	%	#	%	#	%	Total votes
Adams	3,000	65.39%	1,380	30.08%	208	4.53%	1,620	35.31%	4,588
Asotin	3,758	51.83%	2,993	41.28%	500	6.90%	765	10.55%	7,251
Benton	34,513	62.88%	17,089	31.14%	3,283	5.98%	17,424	31.75%	54,885
Chelan	15,599	63.90%	7,350	30.11%	1,462	5.99%	8,249	33.79%	24,411
Clallam	14,118	47.95%	13,066	44.38%	2,259	7.67%	1,052	3.57%	29,443
Clark	59,159	46.74%	59,578	47.07%	7,833	6.19%	-419	-0.33%	126,570
Columbia	1,255	64.49%	547	28.11%	144	7.40%	708	36.38%	1,946
Cowlitz	14,272	40.59%	18,668	53.09%	2,222	6.32%	-4,396	-12.50%	35,162
Douglas	7,306	64.63%	3,416	30.22%	583	5.16%	3,890	34.41%	11,305
Ferry	1,533	54.54%	1,008	35.86%	270	9.61%	525	18.68%	2,811
Franklin	7,781	59.17%	4,612	35.07%	757	5.76%	3,169	24.10%	13,150
Garfield	729	61.42%	366	30.83%	92	7.75%	363	30.58%	1,187
Grant	14,063	62.76%	6,944	30.99%	1,399	6.24%	7,119	31.77%	22,406
Grays Harbor	8,788	35.81%	14,278	58.19%	1,472	6.00%	-5,490	-22.37%	24,538
Island	15,520	51.42%	12,844	42.56%	1,816	6.02%	2,676	8.87%	30,180
Jefferson	5,683	38.25%	8,091	54.46%	1,084	7.30%	-2,408	-16.21%	14,858
King	284,523	40.23%	377,574	53.38%	45,180	6.39%	-93,051	-13.16%	707,277
Kitsap	44,706	46.33%	45,557	47.22%	6,224	6.45%	-851	-0.88%	96,487
Kittitas	6,948	53.21%	5,249	40.20%	861	6.59%	1,699	13.01%	13,058
Klickitat	3,656	49.43%	3,177	42.96%	563	7.61%	479	6.48%	7,396
Lewis	16,432	58.07%	10,067	35.57%	1,799	6.36%	6,365	22.49%	28,298
Lincoln	3,086	65.63%	1,379	29.33%	237	5.04%	1,707	36.30%	4,702
Mason	9,520	45.23%	10,107	48.02%	1,421	6.75%	-587	-2.79%	21,048
Okanogan	7,742	57.17%	4,663	34.43%	1,137	8.40%	3,079	22.74%	13,542
Pacific	3,123	35.40%	5,174	58.65%	525	5.95%	-2,051	-23.25%	8,822
Pend Oreille	2,675	53.62%	1,893	37.94%	421	8.44%	782	15.67%	4,989
Pierce	114,239	45.73%	120,421	48.21%	15,132	6.06%	-6,182	-2.47%	249,792
San Juan	3,151	40.88%	3,939	51.10%	618	8.02%	-788	-10.22%	7,708
Skagit	20,543	49.00%	18,699	44.61%	2,679	6.39%	1,844	4.40%	41,921
Skamania	1,753	45.23%	1,679	43.32%	444	11.46%	74	1.91%	3,876
Snohomish	107,814	46.11%	111,601	47.73%	14,387	6.15%	-3,787	-1.62%	233,802
Spokane	83,967	53.34%	63,709	40.47%	9,748	6.19%	20,258	12.87%	157,424
Stevens	9,528	57.84%	5,370	32.60%	1,575	9.56%	4,158	25.24%	16,473
Thurston	54,692	59.20%	32,765	35.47%	4,922	5.33%	21,927	23.74%	92,379
Wahkiakum	806	44.29%	896	49.23%	118	6.48%	-90	-4.95%	1,820
Walla Walla	11,879	60.50%	6,526	33.24%	1,229	6.26%	5,353	27.26%	19,634
Whatcom	31,626	48.02%	29,979	45.52%	4,258	6.46%	1,647	2.50%	65,863
Whitman	7,944	54.37%	5,748	39.34%	918	6.28%	2,196	15.03%	14,610
Yakima	36,481	55.61%	25,287	38.54%	3,839	5.85%	11,194	17.06%	65,607
Totals	1,073,911	47.08%	1,063,689	46.63%	143,619	6.30%	10,222	0.45%	2,281,219

Counties that flipped from Republican to Democratic

- Clark (largest city: Vancouver)
- Cowlitz (largest city: Longview)
- Grays Harbor (largest city: Aberdeen)
- Jefferson (largest city: Port Townsend)
- King (largest city: Seattle)
- Kitsap (largest city: Bremerton)
- Mason (largest city: Shelton)
- Pierce (largest city: Tacoma)
- San Juan (largest city: Friday Harbor)
- Snohomish (largest city: Everett)
- Wahkiakum (largest city: Puget Island)
