= 1988 Washington Secretary of State election =

- November 8, 1988
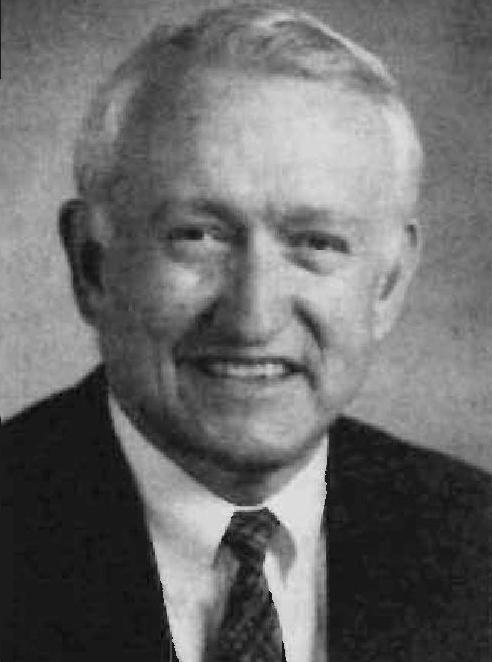

Nominee	Ralph Munro	John O'Hagan McKee
Party	Republican	Democratic
Popular vote	1,096,057	653,047
Percentage	62.66%	37.34%
- County results Munro: 50–60% 60–70% 70–80% McKee: 50–60%
Secretary of State before election
Ralph Munro
Republican
Elected Secretary of State
Ralph Munro
Republican

The 1988 Washington Secretary of State election was held on November 8, 1988, in order to elect the Secretary of State of Washington. Republican nominee and incumbent Secretary of State Ralph Munro won re-election against Democratic nominee John O'Hagan McKee.

== General election ==
On election day, November 8, 1988, Republican nominee Ralph Munro won re-election by a margin of 443,010 votes against his opponent Democratic nominee John O'Hagan McKee, thereby retaining Republican control over the office of Secretary of State. Munro was sworn in for his third term on January 3, 1989.

=== Results ===
1988 Washington Secretary of State election
Party	Candidate	Votes	%	±%
Republican	Ralph Munro (incumbent)	1,096,057	62.66	+1.28
Democratic	John O'Hagan McKee	653,047	37.34	–1.28
Total votes		1,749,104	100.00	N/A
Republican hold				

==== By county ====
County results
County	Ralph Munro Republican		John O'Hagan McKee Democratic		Margin		Total votes
County	#	%	#	%	#	%	Total votes
Adams	2,891	69.68%	1,258	30.32%	1,633	39.36%	4,149
Asotin	3,186	51.89%	2,954	48.11%	232	3.78%	6,140
Benton	30,570	72.52%	11,581	27.48%	18,989	45.05%	42,151
Chelan	12,560	68.42%	5,797	31.58%	6,763	36.84%	18,357
Clallam	13,587	62.65%	8,101	37.35%	5,486	25.30%	21,688
Clark	41,623	56.80%	31,653	43.20%	9,970	13.61%	73,276
Columbia	1,200	65.68%	627	34.32%	573	31.36%	1,827
Cowlitz	13,492	50.83%	13,049	49.17%	443	1.67%	26,541
Douglas	6,066	67.51%	2,920	32.49%	3,146	35.01%	8,986
Ferry	1,042	55.04%	851	44.96%	191	10.09%	1,893
Franklin	6,716	66.75%	3,345	33.25%	3,371	33.51%	10,061
Garfield	812	65.48%	428	34.52%	384	30.97%	1,240
Grant	11,035	66.05%	5,671	33.95%	5,364	32.11%	16,706
Grays Harbor	11,289	49.67%	11,441	50.33%	-152	-0.67%	22,730
Island	14,129	70.29%	5,973	29.71%	8,156	40.57%	20,102
Jefferson	5,487	60.23%	3,623	39.77%	1,864	20.46%	9,110
King	377,533	62.67%	224,900	37.33%	152,633	25.34%	602,433
Kitsap	45,257	66.71%	22,586	33.29%	22,671	33.42%	67,843
Kittitas	6,321	63.10%	3,696	36.90%	2,625	26.21%	10,017
Klickitat	3,171	56.76%	2,416	43.24%	755	13.51%	5,587
Lewis	14,945	67.48%	7,203	32.52%	7,742	34.96%	22,148
Lincoln	2,973	67.68%	1,420	32.32%	1,553	35.35%	4,393
Mason	9,258	60.98%	5,924	39.02%	3,334	21.96%	15,182
Okanogan	6,525	58.82%	4,568	41.18%	1,957	17.64%	11,093
Pacific	3,683	48.94%	3,843	51.06%	-160	-2.13%	7,526
Pend Oreille	2,003	55.78%	1,588	44.22%	415	11.56%	3,591
Pierce	105,005	61.23%	66,485	38.77%	38,520	22.46%	171,490
San Juan	3,635	67.99%	1,711	32.01%	1,924	35.99%	5,346
Skagit	19,211	63.10%	11,232	36.90%	7,979	26.21%	30,443
Skamania	1,481	51.26%	1,408	48.74%	73	2.53%	2,889
Snohomish	98,962	63.68%	56,437	36.32%	42,525	27.37%	155,399
Spokane	80,754	58.96%	56,216	41.04%	24,538	17.91%	136,970
Stevens	7,174	62.75%	4,259	37.25%	2,915	25.50%	11,433
Thurston	45,295	69.57%	19,810	30.43%	25,485	39.14%	65,105
Wahkiakum	651	47.21%	728	52.79%	-77	-5.58%	1,379
Walla Walla	10,945	67.36%	5,303	32.64%	5,642	34.72%	16,248
Whatcom	29,358	62.98%	17,256	37.02%	12,102	25.96%	46,614
Whitman	9,169	64.67%	5,009	35.33%	4,160	29.34%	14,178
Yakima	37,063	65.21%	19,777	34.79%	17,286	30.41%	56,840
Totals	1,096,057	62.66%	653,047	37.34%	443,010	25.33%	1,749,104

Counties that flipped from Democratic to Republican

- Cowlitz (largest city: Longview)
- Skamania (largest city: Carson)
