= Mainstream Republicans of Washington =

Republican political action committee

- Formation: 1990
- Founders: Daniel J. Evans; Sam Reed; Joel Pritchard
- Purpose: political advocacy
- Political position: Center to center-left
- Headquarters: Tumwater, Washington
- Region served: Washington
- Official language: English
- Executive-Director: Alex Hayes
- Chair: Sam Reed
- Website: www.washingtonmainstream.org

Mainstream Republicans of Washington is a political action organization dedicated to promoting moderation in the Republican Party in Washington state by providing financial and other support to centrist Republican candidates standing for election in swing districts and statewide office.

== History ==
Daniel J. Evans, Sam Reed and Joel Pritchard, the former Governor, future Secretary of State and current Lieutenant Governor of Washington respectively organized a symposium with other Republicans to discuss the future of the Republican Party in the state in 1969. The event, branded the Cascade Conference, ultimately became an annual meeting. In 1990, attendees of the Cascade Conference organized the Mainstream Republicans of Washington as a permanent advocacy group. In 2002, the Republican Main Street Partnership and the Mainstream Republicans of Washington announced a working partnership "to recruit, promote and support quality moderate Republicans for elective office in Washington state and nationwide."

== Members ==
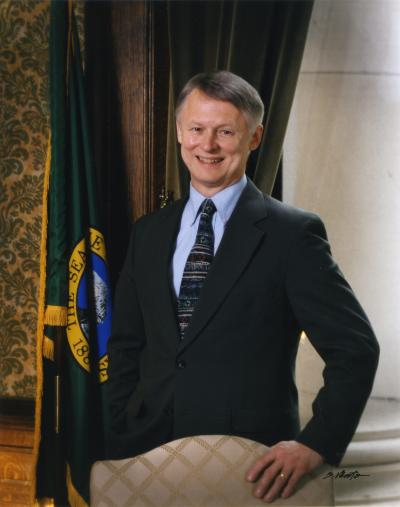
Former Washington secretary of State Sam Reed, pictured here in 2005, is considered the founder of Mainstream Republicans of Washington.

Members of Mainstream Republicans of Washington include former congressman Sid Morrison, former secretaries of state Ralph Munro and Sam Reed, former lands commissioner Doug Sutherland, and state legislators Gary Alexander, Steve Litzow, and Hans Zeiger.

Rodney Tom, a one-time Republican state legislator who switched to the Democratic Party, is a former member of the group's board of directors.

== Activities ==
Since 2008, Mainstream Republicans has organized Action for Washington, an annual leadership training program targeting college students and recent college graduates.

The group continues to host its annual symposium, the Cascade Conference. In 2007, former United States Attorney John McKay, who had been fired by the George W. Bush administration in the dismissal of U.S. attorneys controversy, received enthusiastic applause when he addressed the conference. The 2013 event featured a speech by Tacoma mayor Marilyn Strickland, a Democratic Party activist who had previously made headlines when she described Republicans as "racist," a remark for which she later apologized.

The organization claims to have raised and donated more than $500,000 to Republican candidates in Washington in 2012. Major supporters of the group that year included Microsoft and Weyerhaeuser, which each donated $25,000, and former McCaw Cellular executive Bruce McCaw, who gave $10,000. Labor unions, including the state teachers' union and the Washington Federation of State Employees, also contributed to the Mainstream Republicans of Washington.

== Positions and endorsements ==
Mainstream Republicans of Washington has generally advocated consensus-building and compromise in public policy while backing fiscally conservative candidates with both socially conservative and socially liberal views. In 2013 the group's executive-director called on the Republican Party to eschew conservative candidates in favor of those likely to "attract more people living in the middle of the spectrum."

The organization has had a sometimes-contentious relationship with religious conservatives. When Ken Eikenberry, the chairman of the Washington State Republican Party, was challenged for the party's leadership in 1994 by the head of the Christian Coalition in Washington, Mainstream Republicans president Mark Gardner warned that religious conservatives were trying to gain control of the party's money and influence. The group cautioned that, while they would ultimately be willing to back most Republican candidates, they might also campaign against those they found too extreme.

In 2005 Mainstream Republicans came out in opposition to Washington Initiative 912, a ballot measure that would have repealed a 9.5-cent gas tax enacted by the state legislature. The tax increase had been passed to fund transportation infrastructure improvements.

Mainstream Republicans of Washington backed Washington Referendum 71 in 2009, which allowed same-sex couples to enter into domestic partnerships in the state, and endorsed Washington Referendum 74, a measure introduced in 2012 to license same-sex marriage. In the Washington gubernatorial election, 2012, Mainstream Republicans of Washington endorsed GOP candidate Rob McKenna and criticized votes taken by Democratic challenger Jay Inslee while in Congress which the group characterized as being anti-gay. The following year the group joined with the Democratic Party in Washington in opposing Initiative 517, a ballot measure that would require some private property owners to allow petitioners to gather signatures on their property. The proposal was subsequently rejected by voters. The 2013 election season also saw Mainstream Republicans of Washington come out against Initiative 522, which would have required labeling of genetically modified foods.

Other recent candidate endorsements the group has made include Joe Fain, Dick Muri, Jan Angel, and Kim Wyman.

== Controversies ==
In 2004, an environmental advocacy group—Washington Conservation Voters—objected to a claim made by Mainstream Republicans of Washington that Republican candidate Doug Sutherland had been endorsed by the group in his campaign for lands commissioner. While individual board members of Washington Conservation Voters had endorsed Sutherland, the organization itself had endorsed his Democratic opponent, Mike Cooper. Mainstream Republicans of Washington subsequently posted a clarification on its website.

The Washington state Public Disclosure Commission fined Mainstream Republicans of Washington $10,000 in 2005 after the group made a $30,000 contribution to Sam Reed's campaign for reelection as secretary of state. The donation limit was $1,350.

In 2007 Mainstream Republicans of Washington again had a run-in with Washington Conservation Voters when the group charged that a Mainstream Republicans campaign mailer falsely implied some of the candidates it was endorsing had also received endorsements from Washington Conservation Voters. A Public Disclosure Commission investigation exonerated the Mainstream Republicans.

== See also ==
- Washington State Republican Party
