= 1992 Washington Secretary of State election =

- November 3, 1992
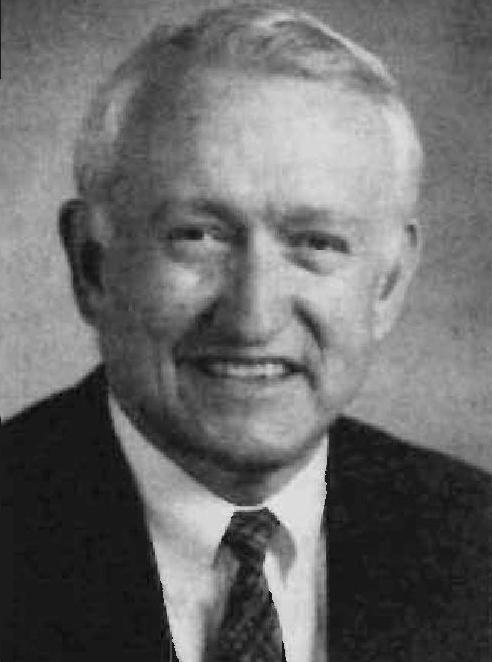

Nominee	Ralph Munro	Jeanne Dixon
Party	Republican	Democratic
Popular vote	1,206,414	875,653
Percentage	56.14%	40.75%
- County results Munro: 50–60% 60–70% Dixon: 40–50% 50–60%
Secretary of State before election
Ralph Munro
Republican
Elected Secretary of State
Ralph Munro
Republican

The 1992 Washington Secretary of State election took place on November 3, 1992. Incumbent secretary of state Ralph Munro was re-elected.

== Primary election ==
The primary election took place in September, with Republican incumbent Ralph Munro running unopposed. Libertarian candidate Maurice Willey also secured his party's nomination by acclamation.

In the Democratic primary, first-time candidate Jeanne Dixon - who had spent less than $1,000 on her campaign - soundly defeated the party-backed Juanita Garrison by more than 100,000 votes. The shock outcome was widely ascribed to the fact that Dixon's name was very similar to that of the well-known astrologer Jeane Dixon. Dixon rejected the theory, instead claiming voters were aware of her due to the many garden club meetings she frequently attended. An unemployed former real estate agent who lived on disability insurance due to a glandular condition that left her unable to work, Dixon had never before held public office, though had run for Governor of Washington in 1988 (a race in which she was described by the Seattle Times as a "throwaway candidate"). Garrison, meanwhile - the stepdaughter of Warren Magnuson - had been recruited and supported by the Democratic Party in an effort to break a longtime Republican lock on the secretary of state's office.

Contacted by the Associated Press for reaction to the election results, astrologer Jeane Dixon - a resident of Washington, D.C. - said "I hope my name brings her luck." Washington State Democratic Party executive-director Jeff Smith, meanwhile, described the outcome of the Democratic primary as "a tragedy for voters."

== General election ==
In the general election, Ralph Munro was easily re-elected secretary of state.

=== Results ===
1996 Washington Secretary of State election
Party	Candidate	Votes	%	±%
Republican	Ralph Munro (incumbent)	1,206,414	56.14%	–6.52%
Democratic	Jeanne Dixon	875,653	40.75%	+3.41%
Libertarian	Maurice Willey	66,953	3.12%	N/A
Total votes		2,281,219	100.00%	N/A
Republican hold				

==== By county ====
County results
County	Ralph Munro Republican		Jeanne Dixon Democratic		Maurice Willey Libertarian		Margin		Total votes
County	#	%	#	%	#	%	#	%	Total votes
Adams	2,790	64.94%	1,377	32.05%	129	3.00%	1,413	32.89%	4,296
Asotin	3,218	45.65%	3,561	50.52%	270	3.83%	-343	-4.87%	7,049
Benton	33,000	66.80%	14,870	30.10%	1,532	3.10%	18,130	36.70%	49,402
Chelan	14,276	66.32%	6,757	31.39%	492	2.29%	7,519	34.93%	21,525
Clallam	15,537	58.00%	10,233	38.20%	1,017	3.80%	5,304	19.80%	26,787
Clark	54,856	55.08%	40,987	41.15%	3,751	3.77%	13,869	13.93%	99,594
Columbia	1,145	62.74%	635	34.79%	45	2.47%	510	27.95%	1,825
Cowlitz	14,851	46.23%	16,338	50.86%	933	2.90%	-1,487	-4.63%	32,122
Douglas	6,515	63.12%	3,549	34.38%	258	2.50%	2,966	28.73%	10,322
Ferry	1,206	50.78%	1,044	43.96%	125	5.26%	162	6.82%	2,375
Franklin	7,419	63.63%	3,945	33.83%	296	2.54%	3,474	29.79%	11,660
Garfield	790	63.86%	418	33.79%	29	2.34%	372	30.07%	1,237
Grant	12,561	60.73%	7,532	36.42%	589	2.85%	5,029	24.32%	20,682
Grays Harbor	13,263	51.79%	11,521	44.99%	825	3.22%	1,742	6.80%	25,609
Island	15,120	58.84%	9,790	38.10%	787	3.06%	5,330	20.74%	25,697
Jefferson	6,214	51.06%	5,482	45.04%	475	3.90%	732	6.01%	12,171
King	399,991	55.33%	301,137	41.65%	21,844	3.02%	98,854	13.67%	722,972
Kitsap	47,763	57.25%	33,273	39.88%	2,388	2.86%	14,490	17.37%	83,424
Kittitas	6,500	55.86%	4,794	41.20%	343	2.95%	1,706	14.66%	11,637
Klickitat	3,175	51.09%	2,811	45.23%	229	3.68%	364	5.86%	6,215
Lewis	15,252	59.91%	9,408	36.95%	799	3.14%	5,844	22.95%	25,459
Lincoln	2,989	63.70%	1,589	33.87%	114	2.43%	1,400	29.84%	4,692
Mason	9,882	52.48%	8,364	44.42%	584	3.10%	1,518	8.06%	18,830
Okanogan	6,343	52.96%	5,092	42.52%	541	4.52%	1,251	10.45%	11,976
Pacific	4,110	47.48%	4,261	49.22%	286	3.30%	-151	-1.74%	8,657
Pend Oreille	2,387	53.91%	1,869	42.21%	172	3.88%	518	11.70%	4,428
Pierce	119,545	52.59%	101,497	44.65%	6,257	2.75%	18,048	7.94%	227,299
San Juan	3,521	53.15%	2,807	42.37%	297	4.48%	714	10.78%	6,625
Skagit	21,121	55.36%	15,678	41.10%	1,350	3.54%	5,443	14.27%	38,149
Skamania	1,550	46.45%	1,551	46.48%	236	7.07%	-1	-0.03%	3,337
Snohomish	114,920	54.56%	88,646	42.09%	7,056	3.35%	26,274	12.47%	210,622
Spokane	94,044	58.07%	62,684	38.71%	5,224	3.23%	31,360	19.36%	161,952
Stevens	8,133	59.19%	5,077	36.95%	530	3.86%	3,056	22.24%	13,740
Thurston	50,332	62.82%	27,059	33.77%	2,731	3.41%	23,273	29.05%	80,122
Wahkiakum	834	51.20%	740	45.43%	55	3.38%	94	5.77%	1,629
Walla Walla	11,438	61.76%	6,547	35.35%	534	2.88%	4,891	26.41%	18,519
Whatcom	33,651	57.22%	23,302	39.63%	1,853	3.15%	10,349	17.60%	58,806
Whitman	9,815	60.91%	5,694	35.34%	605	3.75%	4,121	25.57%	16,114
Yakima	36,357	59.15%	23,734	38.62%	1,372	2.23%	12,623	20.54%	61,463
Totals	1,206,414	56.14%	875,653	40.75%	66,953	3.12%	330,761	15.39%	2,149,020

Counties that flipped from Democratic to Republican

- Grays Harbor (largest city: Aberdeen)
- Wahkiakum (largest city: Puget Island)

Counties that flipped from Republican to Democratic

- Asotin (largest city: Clarkston)
- Cowlitz (largest city: Longview)
- Skamania (largest city: Carson)
