= 2004 Washington Secretary of State election =

2004 Washington secretary of state election
- November 2, 2004
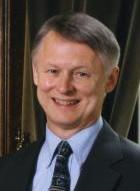

Nominee	Sam Reed	Laura Ruderman
Party	Republican	Democratic
Popular vote	1,369,421	1,209,299
Percentage	51.47%	45.45%
- County results Reed: 40–50% 50–60% 60–70% 70–80% Ruderman: 40–50% 50–60%
Secretary of State before election
Sam Reed
Republican
Elected Secretary of State
Sam Reed
Republican

The 2004 Washington Secretary of State election was held on Tuesday, November 2, 2004, to elect the Washington Secretary of State, concurrently with the 2004 U.S. presidential election, as well as elections to the U.S. Senate and various state and local elections, including for U.S. House and governor of Washington. Primary elections took place on September 14.

Incumbent Republican Secretary of State Sam Reed was re-elected to a second term in office, defeating Democratic challenger Laura Ruderman.

== Republican primary ==
=== Candidates ===
==== Nominee ====
- Sam Reed, incumbent secretary of state (2001–2013)

=== Results ===
Republican primary results
Party	Candidate	Votes	%
Republican	Sam Reed (incumbent)	448,936	100.00%
Total votes		448,936	100.00%

== Democratic primary ==
=== Candidates ===
==== Nominee ====
- Laura Ruderman, state representative (1999–2005)

=== Results ===
Democratic primary results
Party	Candidate	Votes	%
Democratic	Laura Ruderman	612,104	100.00%
Total votes		612,104	100.00%

== Libertarian primary ==
=== Candidates ===
==== Nominee ====
- Jacqueline Passey

=== Results ===
Libertarian primary results
Party	Candidate	Votes	%
Libertarian	Jacqueline Passey	12,787	100.00%
Total votes		12,787	100.00%

== General election ==
=== Endorsements ===
Sam Reed (R)

Newspapers

- The Seattle Times

=== Results ===
2004 Washington Secretary of State election
Party	Candidate	Votes	%	±%
Republican	Sam Reed (incumbent)	1,369,421	51.47%	+4.39%
Democratic	Laura Ruderman	1,209,299	45.45%	–1.18%
Libertarian	Jacqueline Passey	82,097	3.09%	–1.04%
Total votes		2,660,817	100.00%	N/A
Republican hold				

==== By county ====
County results
County	Sam Reed Republican		Laura Ruderman Democratic		Jacqueline Passey Libertarian		Margin		Total votes
County	#	%	#	%	#	%	#	%	Total votes
Adams	3,362	70.62%	1,298	27.26%	101	2.12%	2,064	43.35%	4,761
Asotin	4,474	55.00%	3,423	42.08%	238	2.93%	1,051	12.92%	8,135
Benton	42,189	68.39%	17,723	28.73%	1,780	2.89%	24,466	39.66%	61,692
Chelan	18,037	65.60%	8,752	31.83%	705	2.56%	9,285	33.77%	27,494
Clallam	17,795	52.87%	14,711	43.71%	1,151	3.42%	3,084	9.16%	33,657
Clark	83,588	53.74%	67,285	43.26%	4,656	2.99%	16,303	10.48%	155,529
Columbia	1,352	69.94%	532	27.52%	49	2.53%	820	42.42%	1,933
Cowlitz	19,274	48.34%	19,322	48.46%	1,277	3.20%	-48	-0.12%	39,873
Douglas	8,472	66.69%	3,912	30.80%	319	2.51%	4,560	35.90%	12,703
Ferry	1,744	56.39%	1,211	39.15%	138	4.46%	533	17.23%	3,093
Franklin	10,072	66.28%	4,756	31.30%	367	2.42%	5,316	34.99%	15,195
Garfield	818	68.00%	356	29.59%	29	2.41%	462	38.40%	1,203
Grant	16,181	65.93%	7,672	31.26%	691	2.82%	8,509	34.67%	24,544
Grays Harbor	13,441	51.00%	12,105	45.93%	808	3.07%	1,336	5.07%	26,354
Island	19,649	55.13%	14,930	41.89%	1,063	2.98%	4,719	13.24%	35,642
Jefferson	7,441	42.23%	9,567	54.29%	613	3.48%	-2,126	-12.07%	17,621
King	368,893	44.81%	428,360	52.03%	25,980	3.16%	-59,467	-7.22%	823,233
Kitsap	56,828	50.78%	51,532	46.04%	3,557	3.18%	5,296	4.73%	111,917
Kittitas	8,912	59.88%	5,519	37.08%	452	3.04%	3,393	22.80%	14,883
Klickitat	4,529	53.72%	3,571	42.36%	331	3.93%	958	11.36%	8,431
Lewis	19,692	65.13%	9,643	31.89%	901	2.98%	10,049	33.24%	30,236
Lincoln	3,514	66.73%	1,619	30.74%	133	2.53%	1,895	35.99%	5,266
Mason	12,720	53.51%	10,262	43.17%	790	3.32%	2,458	10.34%	23,772
Okanogan	8,706	58.27%	5,612	37.56%	623	4.17%	3,094	20.71%	14,941
Pacific	4,397	45.96%	4,815	50.33%	355	3.71%	-418	-4.37%	9,567
Pend Oreille	3,345	57.40%	2,235	38.35%	248	4.26%	1,110	19.05%	5,828
Pierce	151,733	51.34%	135,331	45.79%	8,457	2.86%	16,402	5.55%	295,521
San Juan	3,729	40.25%	5,058	54.60%	477	5.15%	-1,329	-14.35%	9,264
Skagit	26,560	54.02%	21,024	42.76%	1,587	3.23%	5,536	11.26%	49,171
Skamania	2,472	52.22%	2,035	42.99%	227	4.80%	437	9.23%	4,734
Snohomish	138,465	49.98%	130,380	47.06%	8,215	2.97%	8,085	2.92%	277,060
Spokane	104,629	55.06%	79,612	41.89%	5,801	3.05%	25,017	13.16%	190,042
Stevens	11,258	60.06%	6,783	36.19%	704	3.76%	4,475	23.87%	18,745
Thurston	63,581	59.56%	40,084	37.55%	3,086	2.89%	23,497	22.01%	106,751
Wahkiakum	1,156	56.36%	827	40.32%	68	3.32%	329	16.04%	2,051
Walla Walla	13,474	63.67%	7,097	33.54%	590	2.79%	6,377	30.14%	21,161
Whatcom	41,438	49.91%	38,577	46.47%	3,008	3.62%	2,861	3.45%	83,023
Whitman	8,857	53.62%	7,095	42.95%	567	3.43%	1,762	10.67%	16,519
Yakima	42,644	61.56%	24,673	35.62%	1,955	2.82%	17,971	25.94%	69,272
Totals	1,369,421	51.47%	1,209,299	45.45%	82,097	3.09%	160,122	6.02%	2,660,817

Counties that flipped from Democratic to Republican

- Clark (largest city: Vancouver)
- Grays Harbor (largest city: Aberdeen)
- Kitsap (largest city: Bremerton)
- Mason (largest city: Shelton)
- Pierce (largest city: Tacoma)
- Snohomish (largest city: Everett)
- Wahkiakum (largest city: Puget Island)
