= Wole Oguntokun =

Nigerian writer and director (1967–2024)

- Born: 15 July 1967 (age 59)
- Citizenship: Nigeria
- Occupations: Film director, Lawyer

Wole Oguntokun (born Oluwolé Oguntokun, 15 July 1967 – 26 March 2024) was a Nigerian playwright, dramaturge, director and was the artistic director of Theatre Planet Studios and Renegade Theatre as well as a member of the board of Theaturtle, a Canadian theatre company. He was also a theatre administrator and newspaper columnist.

== Education ==
Oguntokun held a Bachelor of Laws from the Obafemi Awolowo University, as well as Master of Laws (LL.M) and Master of Humanitarian and Refugee Studies degrees, from the University of Lagos. He was called to the Nigerian Bar.

== Theatre ==
Oguntokun was dramaturge, culture consultant and dialect coach for the Stratford Festival's 2022 production of Death and the King's Horseman by Wole Soyinka. He was the Stratford Festival's designated host for Soyinka in his July 2022 visit to the Festival's Meighen Forum. He was dramaturge and played the lead role of Elesin Oba in Soulpepper Theatre / Stratford Festival's Canadian production of Soyinka's Death and the King's Horseman as a part of Soulpepper's Around the World in 80 plays project in June 2021.

In February 2021, he won the Young-Howze award for Dramatic Writing of the year for his play The Emancipation of Yankee Oluwale, based on the trial of two English policemen in 1969 for the death of the Nigerian migrant David Oluwale.

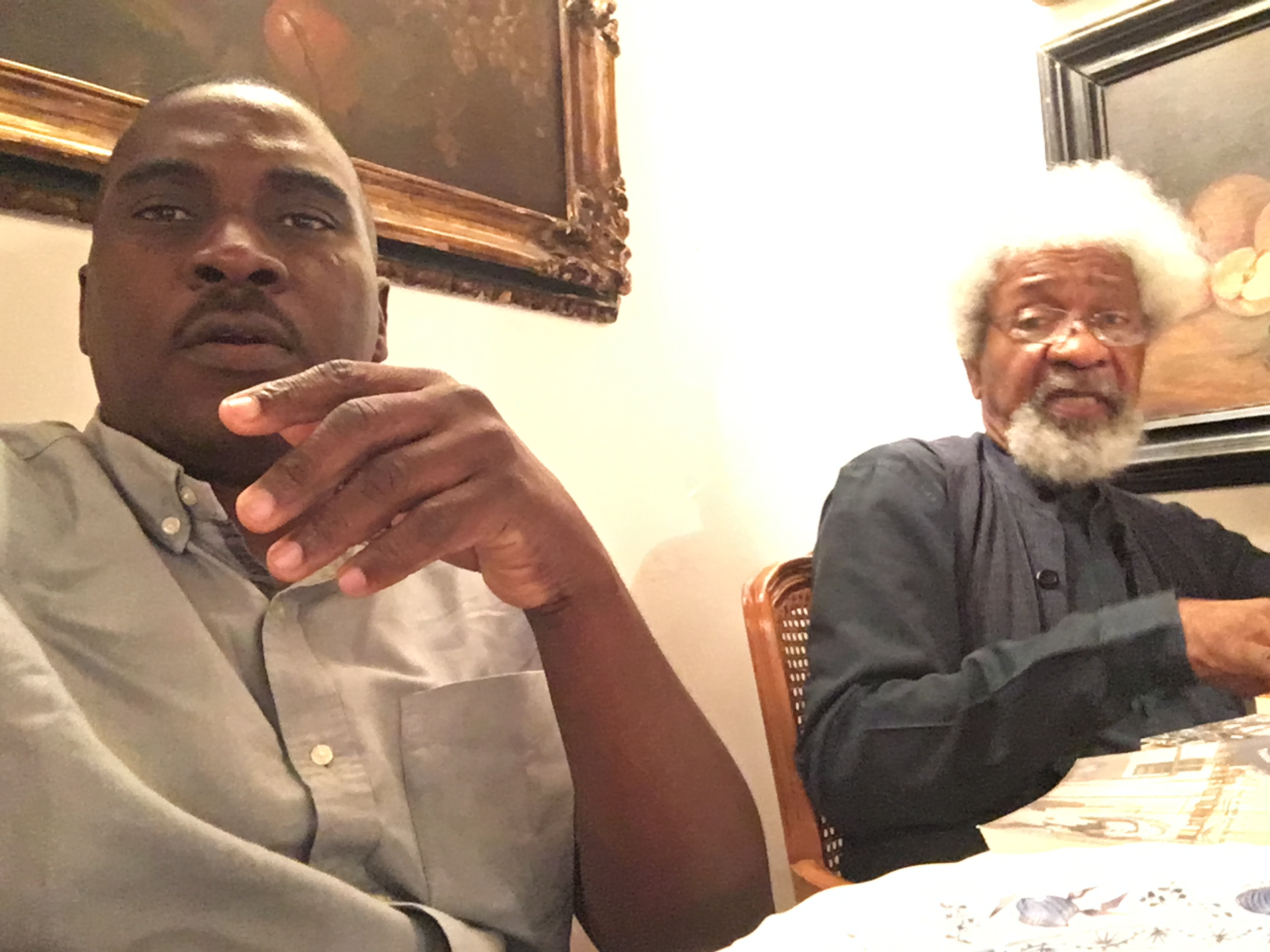
Wole Oguntokun & Wole Soyinka in Rome - December 2017

Oguntokun directed his company, Renegade Theatre, in its 2019 production of his play The Chibok Girls: Our Story at the Cross Currents Festival in Washington DC in tandem with Soyinka's premiere of his new work A Humanist's Ode for Chibok, Leah.

Oguntokun was a 2018 Global Fellow of the New York-based International Society for the Performing Arts (ISPA), a fellowship he was also awarded in 2015 and 2016. He founded and was artistic director of the Theatre Republic a Lagos-based performing arts hub opened in September 2016 which provided production and rehearsal spaces for theatre and dance companies, musicians and visual artists while also artistic director of Renegade Theatre, a Nigerian performing arts company.

Oguntokun moderated the conversation between Soyinka and the audience at the award of the Europe Theatre Special Prize in Rome in December 2017.

Oguntokun wrote and directed the theatrical production of The Chibok Girls: Our Story which premiered at the Muson Centre, Lagos, from 18 to 20 December 2015. The performances, partly supported by the Delegation of the European Union to the Federal Republic of Nigeria and to the Economic Community of West African States, featured three of the school girls who escaped after being abducted by the insurgent group, alongside professional actors. The production was thereafter invited to the 2017 edition of the Ubumuntu Arts Festival in Kigali, Rwanda where it was performed on 16 July.

Oguntokun emerged as a player on the Nigerian Theatre landscape between September and December 1998 with his productions of his satirical stage drama Who's Afraid of Wole Soyinka?, a lampoon of the Nigerian military in governance.

Oguntokun wrote and directed plays including Who's Afraid of Wole Soyinka in May 2002; Rage of the Pentecost – August 2002; Ladugba! – September 2002; and The Other Side – November 2002.

His other plays include "Piper Piper", his adaptation of "The Pied Piper of Hamelin" in March 2003; and Gbanja Roulette, in May and July 2003.

In December 2003, he featured Taiwo Ajai-Lycett in his stage play The Inheritors. He also wrote Prison Chronicles in March 2004, The Other Side starring Kate Henshaw-Nuttall in November 2005; The Sound and The Fury in April 2006; The Inheritors featuring Joke Silva in August 2006, and Anatomy of a Woman featuring Stella Damasus in March 2007.

Oguntokun produced and directed plays by other playwrights including The Trials of Brother Jero by Soyinka, Femi Osofisan's Once upon Four Robbers, Bode Asiyanbi, and Reagan Payne.

In July 2007, Oguntokun initiated a collaboration with the Arts Centre known as Terra Kulture, on Victoria Island, Lagos, and commenced the "Theatre@Terra", becoming its founding producer and artistic director and turning it into one of Nigeria's most consistent venues for Theatre, with plays produced every Sunday at the venue.

Oguntokun produced and directed plays by many of Nigeria's best-known playwrights including Soyinka's (Kongi's Harvest, Madmen & Specialists, The Lion and the Jewel, The Swamp Dwellers, Death and the King's Horseman, The Strong Breed, Childe Internationale, Camwood on the Leaves, The Jero Plays); Osofisan's Morountodun, Once Upon Four Robbers, The Engagement, The Inspector and the Hero; Professor Ola Rotimi's The Gods Are Not to Blame; Zulu Sofola's King Emene, Wedlock of the Gods, Wizard of Law, as well as Athol Fugard's Sizwe Banzi is Dead.

Oguntokun was official consultant to the British Council/Lagos and the crew of the Royal National Theatre in London for the purpose of that National Theatre's production of Soyinka's play Death and the King's Horseman in April and May 2009.

Oguntokun headed the writing team that adapted Eve Ensler's The Vagina Monologues for Nigeria. The result was V Monologues-The Nigerian Story, which he directed in March 2008 at the National Arts Theatre, Terra Kulture, The Muson Centre (all in Lagos) and at The Women's Development Centre and the Shehu Musa Yar'Adua Centre in Abuja.

Oguntokun created the annual "Season of Soyinka" now approaching its 9th Season.

Oguntokun directed A Season in the Congo by Aimé Césaire for the Lagos State Government / UNESCO-sponsored "Black Heritage Festival" in April 2010; his own play The Waiting Room in the same festival for the 2011 Black Heritage Festival, Marco Martinelli's Moor Harlequin's 22 Misfortunes for the 2012 edition of the festival and his play Oshodi Tapa for the 2013 edition. Oshodi Tapa thereafter became the selected opening play to celebrate Lagos State at 50 years. In the 2015 edition, of the Black Heritage Festival, he was selected to present another of his plays, The Tarzan Monologues.

Oguntokun was selected as part of a British Council-Theatre Directors' Residency/Workshop in the United Kingdom in May 2011. In August 2011 and 2013, he was one of two Nigerians selected as a British Council delegates to the Edinburgh Fringe Festival in Scotland. He selected a production, The Animals and Children took to the Streets by the British performing arts company, 1927, from the Edinburgh Festival Fringe in 2013 and the production was sponsored to Nigeria in November 2011.

Oguntokun directed the Nigerian premiere of Ntozake Shange's play For Colored Girls Who Have Considered Suicide When the Rainbow Is Enuf on 29 and 30 December at the Shell Hall, Muson Centre in Lagos, and on 15 June 2014, at the Eko Convention Centre – Eko Hotel and Suites in collaboration with Flytime Entertainment.

Oguntokun's theatre company, Renegade Theatre, was one of five African theatre companies and the only West African company selected to be part of the Shakespeare Cultural Olympiad at the Globe Theatre (Globe to Globe Festival) in London in April–June 2012. 37 international touring theatre companies presented each of Shakespeare's 37 plays in a different language. Oguntokun directed The Winter's Tale in Yoruba on 24 and 25 May 2012 at the Globe Theatre. On 9 and 10 November 2013, he directed his adaptation of William Shakespeare's Macbeth at the Muson Centre, Lagos, setting it in the aftermath of the Nigerian Civil War.

Oguntokun produced and directed his play The Waiting Room at the Edinburgh Festival Fringe from 1–26 August 2013 making it the first Nigerian play to feature at the festival. In 2014, he returned to the Edinburgh Festival Fringe as director and producer of the same Nigerian company (Renegade Theatre) with another production – The Tarzan Monologues at the Underbelly, Cowgate, from 31 July until 24 August. They were the first Nigerian plays presented at the world's biggest arts festival.

Oguntokun also directed three Muson Festival Plays: The Gods Are Not to Blame (2006), An Ordinary Legacy (2012) and his own adaptation of Cyprian Ekwensi's Jagua Nana (2014).

Oguntokun was the recipient of the National Association of Nigerian Theatre Practitioners' (NANTAP) Award for Excellence (November 2012) and an Arts Patron Award (November 2013) at the Association's annual conventions.

== Television ==
Oguntokun independently produced and wrote the TV sit-coms, Crossworld Blues on DBN TV (1999) and Living Free on MBI television (2002). He also produced the television show on current affairs The Cutting Edge, which ran on MBI in 2002. He was a producer and Head Writer on Season II of the Pan-African talk-show Moments with Mo and produced briefly on Season IV.

== Documentary ==
Oguntokun wrote and produced a documentary on inner-city violence on young females, The Sounds Of Silence, which was commissioned by the Ajegunle Community Project (ACP) (2009).

In March 2007 he commenced "The Girl Whisperer", a weekly column on gender relations in the Sunday Guardian. The column ran for seven years. He was a member of the Governing Council of the Committee for Relevant Art (CORA), a leading Arts and Culture Advocacy Group in Nigeria and a director on the board of Theaturtle, a Canadian Theatre company.

== Death ==
Oguntokun died on 26 March 2024, at the age of 56.
