= People of the City =

1954 novel Cyprian Ekwensi

People Of The City
- Author: Cyprian Ekwensi
- Language: English
- Genre: Fiction
- Published: 1954
- Publisher: Heinemann
- Publication place: Nigeria
- Media type: Print (paperback)
- ISBN: 9780435900052

People of the City is the debut novel of Cyprian Ekwensi first published in 1954 by Andrew Dakers Ltd. The novel was a predecessor to a number of other city novels in the Nigerian tradition.

== Development ==
Ekwensi began writing the novel while studying pharmacy on scholarship at the University of London. The novel, originated as a series of stories broadcast on the radio, for West Africans living in Britain after World War II.

Critic Chidi Okonkwo, says that the primary influences for Ekwensi when developing the novel and his writing style, included "Westerns, detective thrillers, oriental tales like Arabian Nights", "European-hero-in-Africa" tales, like those of H. Rider Haggard, adventure tales like Robert Louis Stevenson's, and Indian films." Okonkwo describes these influences as obscuring Ekwensi's earlier experience translating African indigenous stories into English.

== Style ==
The novel has a didactic tone.

== Themes ==
The novel challenges European colonial dominance in Africa.

== Literary criticism ==
Early reception of the novel was generally positive, focusing on the urban setting.
