= Ẹni Ògún =

2014 play written by Wole Oguntokun

- Promotional poster
- Original language: English
- Written by: Wole Oguntokun
- Subject: Autobiographical works of Wole Soyinka
- Genre: Historical

Premiere
- Date: 19 July 2014
- Place: Muson Centre

Ẹni Ògún is a biographical stage play performed in celebration of Wole Soyinka's 80th birthday in 2014. The play, which lasted for two days, was performed at Muson Centre and was written and directed by Wole Oguntokun.

== Background ==
As part of activities lined up to mark the birthday of Soyinka, Ẹni Ògún was performed based on his autobiographical works. The play explores Soyinka's childhood, which was characterized by his strict father, "wild Christian" mother, and the loss of his sister Folashade, as well as his political ambition and his literary works. Ẹni Ògún was also based on three books published by Soyinka which included Aké: The Years of Childhood (1981), Ibadan: the Penkelemes Years (1989), and You Must Set Forth at Dawn (2006).

== Characters ==
- Ezeoba
- Grace Eniola
- Folashade
- Iku
- Odejimi
- Soyinka
- S.A.
