= Burning Grass =

1962 novel by Cyprian Ekwensi

First Edition, 1962 (Heinemann African Writers Series)

Burning Grass is a novel by Nigerian author Cyprian Ekwensi. It was published in 1962 as the second book in Heinemann's African Writers Series.

== Publication ==
Burning Grass was the first novel written for publication in the African Writers Series, which had begun by reprinting books that had appeared elsewhere. The manuscript was cut from 80,000 to 40,000 words by the publisher.

Heinemann believed the main audience for the novel would be secondary school children, but orders far exceeded their expectations. The first print run of 2,500 sold out quickly and it has been reprinted by Heinemann a number of times. It was later published by East African Educational Publishers and has been translated into German as Der Wanderzauber.

== Background ==
The novel's main characters are members of a Mbororo-Fulani family living in colonial northern Nigeria. While the author was a non-Mbororo-Fulani, the book offers a convincing account of the values and ways of life of this community. It is based on a short visit Ekwensi made to the area. He recorded his experiences in 'Three Weeks among the Fulani', which appeared in the October 1960 edition of Nigeria Magazine.

The Mbororo-Fulani are pastoralists and the rural setting is quite different from the largely urban one that the author chose for many of his other books. The arid landscape is central to characterisation throughout the novel.

== Plot ==
The story revolves around a series of adventures involving the Fulani Sunsaye family, particularly Mai Sunsaye, head of the household and chief of Dokan Toro. Mai Sunsaye rescues a slave-girl, Fatimeh, from the servant of a rough man known as Shehu. The appearance of Fatimeh in the family leads to a series of unfortunate incidents which precipitate the adventures in the rest of the novel, leading Shaitu, Mai Sunsaye's wife, to view her as bad luck. First, Rikku, Mai Sunsaye's youngest son falls in love with Fatimeh who is much older than he is. Hodio, Rikku's brother, and Mai Sunsaye's second son, however, runs away with Fatimeh, leaving Rikku love-sick. Mai Sunsaye vows to do everything in his power to make Rikku feel better. Around the same time Mai Sunsaye's rival to the throne of Dokan Toro, Ardo, casts a spell on Mai Sunsaye by the aid of a talisman bound to the leg of a "grey-breasted" and "red-toed" Senegal dove. The spell, known as the "sokugo" or the "wandering sickness" is a magic charm that "turned studious men into wanderers, that led husbands to desert their wives, Chiefs their people, and sane men their reason". Under the sway of this wanderlust-inspiring spell, Mai Sunsaye is launched into several adventures, in the course of which he crosses path with Jalla, his oldest son, and other characters, including Baba, an enigmatic old man he meets in the deserted village of Old Chanka (evacuated by British colonial authorities, with inhabitants relocated to New Chanka, due to an outbreak of the tse-tse fly, the vector of the sleeping sickness), and a legendary and mysterious herds-woman known as Ligu, "the champion cattle-herder". At the close of the novel, most of the family is reunited once more in Dokan Toro, and Mai Sunsaye finally dies from the strenuous tolls of his adventures.

== Characters ==
- Mai Sunsaye: The central protagonist; avid adventurer, and father of three sons.
- Rikku: Mai Sunsaye's youngest son, his third child.
- Hodio: Mai Sunsaye's second son.
- Shaitu: Mai Sunsaye's wife
- Leibe: Mai Sunsaye's daughter and fourth child.
- Jalla: Mai Sunsaye's oldest son, his first child.
- Ligu: A famous female herds-woman known as the champion cattle-herder.
- Baba: An eccentric old-man who refuses to leave the deserted town of Old Chanka.
- Fatimeh: the Kanuri slave-girl rescued by the Sunsaye family.
- Kantuma: A beautiful Kanuri woman who takes a strange interest in, and helps Rikku; she dies towards the end of the novel.
- Shehu: One of the principal antagonists of the novel and former owner of Fatimeh.
- Ardo: One of the principal antagonists, and rival to Mai Sunsaye for the chieftaincy of the Fulani settlement of Dokan Toro.

== Reception ==
Margaret Laurence described Burning Grass as containing "...many of the qualities of the traditional African tales, magical occurrences, mysterious and seductive women, acts of phenomenal heroism, swift-paced adventure."
