= An African Night's Entertainment =

1962 novel by Cyprian Ekwensi

- Author: Cyprian Ekwensi
- Language: English
- Genre: Fiction
- Published: 1962
- Publisher: African Universities Press
- Publication place: Nigeria
- Pages: 96

An African Night's Entertainment is a 1962 folktale novel by Nigerian author Cyprian Ekwensi.

== Plot ==
The novel is set in Northern Nigeria and is narrated by an old storyteller. It tells the story of Abu Bakir and his quest for vengeance after Zainobe, the girl betrothed to him and the love of his life, ends up marrying Mallam Shehu, a wealthy merchant who is in need of a child. Mallam Shehu and Zainobe have a son named Kyauta.

Abu swears vengeance and roams throughout several towns and villages (losing an eye and an ear in the process) in order to get the items he needs for a charm to make Kyauta worthless. He finally succeeds in making the charm and uses it on Kyauta, who turns into a sociopathic thug and eventually kills his father. Some time later, Abu is himself killed by Kyauta after the effects of the charm had worn off on him.

== Themes ==
Major themes in the novel include desire, vengeance and child marriage.

== Controversy ==
The novel was the subject of controversy when its author Cyprian Ekwensi was accused of plagiarising Jikin Magayi a 1934 novel by Rupert East and John Tafida Umaru written in Hausa but he defended it calling it his own retelling of a folktale once told to him by an old Hausa mallam.
