= Sam Reed =

14th Secretary of State of Washington

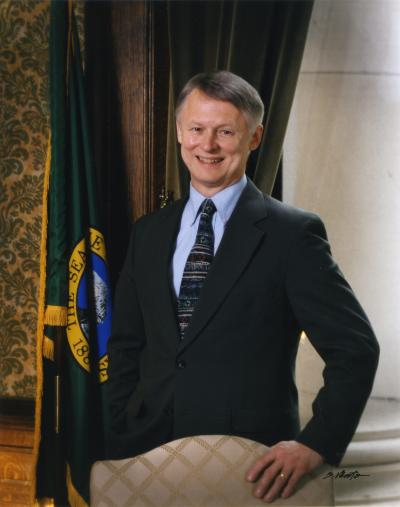

14th Secretary of State of Washington
- In office January 10, 2001 – January 16, 2013
- Governor: Gary Locke; Christine Gregoire
- Preceded by: Ralph Munro
- Succeeded by: Kim Wyman

Auditor of Thurston County
- In office 1978–2000
- Preceded by: Wesley Leach
- Succeeded by: Kim Wyman

Personal details
- Born: Sam Sumner Reed; January 10, 1941 (age 85) Wenatchee, Washington, U.S.
- Party: Republican
- Spouse: Margery Nichols (m. 1963)
- Children: 2
- Education: Washington State University (BA, MA)

Sam Sumner Reed (born January 10, 1941) is an American politician who served as the 14th Secretary of State of Washington from 2001 to 2013. Reed is largely considered to be one of the most consequential state-level secretaries of state in American history.

Reed received his bachelor's and master's degrees in political science from Washington State University. He was elected to the office of Secretary of State in 2000, as one of only two Republicans to be elected to statewide office that year, after serving as Thurston County auditor.

== Early life ==
Reed, whose family lived in Washington since territorial days, grew up in Wenatchee. His family later moved to Spokane where Reed graduated from Lewis and Clark High School. He attended Washington State University, where he earned a bachelor's degree in social studies and master's degree in political science.

== Career ==
A self-described Rockefeller Republican, in 1969 he, along with other moderate to liberal Republicans Chris Bayley and Daniel J. Evans founded the Cascade Conference, a symposium made up of fellow "Mainstream Republicans" where which ultimately evolved into the political advocacy group, the Mainstream Republicans of Washington, who continue to host annual Cascade Conferences to the present day.

Prior to his service as Secretary of State, Reed was elected Thurston County Auditor five times and served as Washington's Assistant Secretary of State under Lud Kramer and Bruce Chapman. He was also appointed by governor Daniel J. Evans onto the Governor's Advisory Council on Urban Affairs.

Reed was first elected as Washington's Secretary of State in 2000, narrowly defeating his Democratic challenger, former Congressman and Clark County Auditor Don Bonker, a conservative Democrat, by just over 0.4%.

=== Creation of the Top-two primary system ===
==== Background ====
In June 2000, California's blanket primary system was ruled unconstitutional by the United States Supreme Court in a landmark case, California Democratic Party v. Jones. It was said to be unconstitutional on the terms that "violated the political parties’ freedom of association." Washington State had adopted a similar blanket primary system in 1935, though after negotiations, the Washington primary system remained unchanged.

Both the Republican Party and the Democratic Party had longtime lobbied for the removal of the blanket primary system in order to gain more control over primary elections. As such, incumbent Secretary of State Ralph Munro, Reed's predecessor began a series of hearings around the state to gather public input on potential changes to the blanket primary system. In 2001, the newly elected Reed released findings that Washington voters strongly favor retaining the blanket primary system. Consequently, the statewide Democratic Party sued Reed, claiming the blanket primary to be unconstitutional, as in California. While Federal District Court in Tacoma upheld the primary, a later ruling in the Ninth Circuit Court of Appeals found the blanket primary system unconstitutional.

==== Bill, veto and later initiative ====
Determined protect the voters of Washington State from political parties having control over elections, Reed used his powers as Secretary of State to sponsor legislation to create a new, top-two primary system, also known as a nonpartisan primary or jungle primary system. Unlike the unconstitutional blanket primary, which mandated that the top vote-getters from each party that is participating in the primary then advance to the general election, the top-two primary advocated that the top-two finishers, regardless of party, advance to the general election.

In March 2004, the legislation easily passed the Democratic-controlled House and Republican-controlled Senate in a bipartisan fashion. Governor Gary Locke vetoed the bill, and lobbied members of his party not to vote to overrule the veto. Outraged, Reed co-ordinated with the Washington State Grange and other organizations to place an initiative on the November 2004 ballot to adopt the nonpartisan primary system.

Titled Initiative 872, the referendum to adopt the top-two primary won in a landslide victory of nearly 60%, winning every county. As a result, the Washington State Republican Party filed a lawsuit on May 19, 2005 to overturn the primary, with the Washington State Democratic Party as a Plaintiff.

==== Supreme Court ruling ====
Consequently, on July 15 later that year, the U.S. District Court struck down the primary system, ruling it as unconstitutional on the same grounds as the blanket primary system. The United States Ninth Circuit Court of Appeals later affirmed this decision in August 2006. However, Washington State Attorney General Rob McKenna, who represented Reed, the Grange and other associated organizations, appealed to the United States Supreme Court. The Court agreed to hear oral arguments on October 1, 2007 in Washington State Grange v. Washington State Republican Party. On March 18, 2008 the Supreme Court overturned the lower ruling by a 7-2 decision, thus reinstating the top-two primary system.

In 2008, Reed helped Washington State conduct the first top-two primary election in the country. It was later found to be extremely popular with Washington voters, having a 76% approval rating.

=== Digital archives ===
In 2004, he launched the nation's first state government digital archives to rescue disappearing electronic history. Following Washington's controversial gubernatorial race in 2004 (the closest such contest in U.S. history), Reed successfully pushed for several improvements to the state's voting process.

=== Other work as Secretary of State ===
As Secretary of State, Reed oversaw the controversial 2004 Washington gubernatorial election between Dino Rossi and Christine Gregoire.

Reed previously served as President of the National Association of Secretaries of State (NASS). He also served as an advisor to the U.S. Election Assistance Commission from 2005 to 2007.

=== Retirement ===
Reed retired as Secretary of State in 2012, endorsing his protégé, Republican Thurston County Auditor, a position Reed himself once held, Kim Wyman, to be his successor. She would go on to win the 2012 election and serve until her resignation amid threats from fellow Republicans who spouted false claims that Wyman organized election fraud that caused President Donald Trump and Republican nominee for governor Loren Culp to lose the 2020 elections in the state.

In retirement, Reed continues to be active in his political advoacy group, the Mainstream Republicans of Washington, including hosting the annual Cascade Conference. Additionally, Reed is a member of the Olympia Kiwanis Club and sits on the Washington State Historical Society Board of Trustees, TVW's Board of Directors, the YMCA Youth & Government Board, and the State Capitol Committee. He also chairs the advisory committee for the Sam Reed Distinguished Professorship in Civic Education and Public Civility at Washington State University and serves on the advisory board for Washington State University's Tom Foley Institute for Public Policy.

== 2004 election ==
In 2004 Reed was re-elected by a relatively comfortable margin of about 6 percent. His opponents were Laura Ruderman, a state legislator, and Jacqueline Passey, a college student.

Sam Reed	Republican	1,369,421	51%
Laura Ruderman	Democrat	1,209,299	45%
Jacqueline Passey	Libertarian	82,097	3%

== 2008 election ==
In November 2008 Sam Reed ran for re-election against Democrat Jason Osgood and won with more than 58 percent of the vote statewide.

== Personal life ==
Reed and his wife Margie reside at their home in Olympia. They have two adult children, David and Kristen, and two grandchildren.

Preceded by Ralph Munro	Secretary of State of Washington; 2001–2013	Succeeded by Kim Wyman
