= Laura Ruderman =

American politician from Washington

Member of the Washington House of Representatives from the 45th district
- In office January 11, 1999 – January 10, 2005
- Preceded by: Bill Backlund
- Succeeded by: Larry Springer

Personal details
- Born: November 8, 1970 (age 55)
- Party: Democratic

Laura Ruderman (born November 8, 1970) is a former Washington State Representative for Washington's 45th legislative district. She is a member of the Democratic Party. Ruderman graduated from Wesleyan University in Middletown, Connecticut.

== Political career ==
Laura Ruderman represented Washington's 45th legislative district from 1999 to 2005. While in office, Ruderman was vice-chair of the Technology, Telecommunications, and Energy Committee, and served on the Health Care, Appropriations, and Rules Committees. In addition to these assignments, she was a member of the K-20 Education Network, the Information Services Board, and the Governor's Task Force on Virtual Learning. Ruderman was elected by her colleagues to be the vice-chair of the House Democratic Caucus.

Ruderman was named one of "100 to Watch" by the Democratic Leadership Council, 2003

Ruderman did not seek re-election in 2004, running instead for Washington State Secretary of State against incumbent Republican Sam Reed; she captured 45% of the vote to Sam Reed's 51%.

On March 20, 2012, Jay Inslee, representing Washington's 1st congressional district, resigned from office, which resulted in simultaneous elections, one to fill the seat for the remainder of the term, and one for the next term. Ruderman ran in both elections, but was eliminated in both races in the blanket primary on August 7, and Democrat Suzan DelBene won both elections on November 6.

== Personal life ==
Laura Ruderman's stepson, Jacob B. Greenburg, was arrested and charged with arson and reckless burning during the Seattle riots in September 2020. Laura Ruderman appeared in court on September 29 to vouch for her stepson. After being released on bail, Jacob B. Greenburg was arrested again on October 16, 2020, for assaulting a police officer. Video of Greenburg's assault with a metal baseball bat swung at the head of a Seattle Police Department bike officer was widely shared during the riots in Seattle in 2020.

== Current activities ==
Since 2005 Ruderman has worked as a school and community activist and a businesswoman. Since January 2019, Ruderman is CEO of the Technology Alliance. She is or has been active in the following organizations:

- RESULTS, a nonprofit organization dedicated to improving the lives of impoverished families through legislative action
- Washington Community Alliance for Self-Help (CASH), a non-profit organization that provides low-income women with credit, business training, and peer support
- K-20 Educational Network
- Digital Learning Commons
- King County Library System Foundation
- Sound Mental Health
- 21 Acres

Ruderman has been a member of the Redmond Chapter of Business and Professional Women, and in 2010 was elected co-chair at Discovery Community School in the Lake Washington School District.
