= Committee for Relevant Art =

Committee for Relevant Art (CORA) is a Nigerian not for profit platform of artists, art critics and aficionados, and a publisher. The members describe themselves as cultural landscapists, and focus on social involvement and debate of cultural issues.

The organization was founded on June 2, 1991, by Toyin Akinosho, Yomi Layinka, Josey Ogbuanoh, Tunde Lanipekun and Chika Okeke-Agulu, and is involved in the organization of various events and activities which support cultural expression and contemporary art. CORA mainly focuses on Nigeria, but meets with a wide response in the rest of the African continent as well. The organization pays attention to several cultural expressions, like literature, theatre, cabaret, films, television programs and music.

CORA is the co-organizer behind several events in Lagos, like quarterly the Art Stampede and annually the Lagos Book & Art Festival (LABAF), the open air Cinema Carnival and Lagos Comics Carnival. Furthermore, it is the publisher of the quarterly magazine Lagos The City Arts Guide, it publishes books and founded several libraries. It also serves as a platform of various forums, like the Arthouse Forum.

In 2006 the Committee for Relevant Art was honored with a Prince Claus Award, in recognition of its 'energetic activities' and for its leadership in enabling the 'contribution of dedicated civilians to stimulate the arts'.

Some artists connected to CORA are playwright and film director Wole Oguntokun, writer and film maker Onyeka Nwelue, critic and publisher Toyin Akinosho and arts and culture journalist Jahman Oladejo Anikulapo.
