= Lokotown and Other Stories =

1966 novel by Cyprian Ekwensi

- First edition
- Author: Cyprian Ekwensi
- Language: English
- Genre: Historical novel
- Publisher: Heinemann
- Publication date: 1966
- Publication place: Nigeria
- Media type: Print (hardback & paperback)
- Pages: 152
- ISBN: 978-1592211852 (reissued)

Lokotown and Other Stories is a collection of nine short stories by Nigerian author Cyprian Ekwensi. It was published in 1966 as the 19th volume in the African Writers Series. Looking at Nigerian city life, his stories show excitement and dissolution.
