= Kokoro (musician) =

Nigerian musician (1925–2009)

Omoba Benjamin Aderounmu, popularly known as Kokoro, (25 February 1925 – 25 January 2009) was a blind minstrel from Lagos, Nigeria. He was born into a royal family in Owo, Ondo State, and became blind when he was aged ten. He developed a unique style of singing accompanied first by a drum, later by a tambourine. He moved to Lagos in 1947, where he became exposed to major local musicians such as Ayinde Bakare, Bobby Benson and Victor Olaiya. In the 1960s and 1970s he featured regularly on Federal and local radio stations, and was widely respected for the depth and wisdom of his lyrics.

An early pioneer of Jùjú music, he sang in Yoruba about love, money, conflicts and urban decadence. He had wide influence on other musicians. The author Cyprian Ekwensi wrote a fictionalized version of his life in his novel for adolescents, The Drummer Boy.

He performed in many cities in Nigeria and overseas, but was exploited by people who took advantage of his blindness. Often he was homeless, playing on the streets to make ends meet. However, in 2007 the governor of Lagos State Babatunde Raji Fashola donated him a two-bedroom apartment after meeting him at a performance by King Sunny Adé. He was married to his wife for 32 years, Abike Beatrice Adewunmi. Kokoro died of a diarrhea-related ailment shortly before the planned release of his album titled Igi Araba.
