= Cyprian Ekwensi =

Nigerian author (1921–2007)

Chief Cyprian Ekwensi MFR
- Born: Cyprian Odiatu Duaka Ekwensi; 26 September 1921; Minna, Niger State
- Died: 4 November 2007 (aged 86); Enugu, Enugu State
- Occupations: Pharmacist, broadcaster, author
- Spouse(s): Eunice Anyiwo, Maria Chime
- Children: Five
- Writing career
- Genres: Short stories and children's fiction

Chief Cyprian Odiatu Duaka Ekwensi MFR (26 September 1921 – 4 November 2007) was a Nigerian author of novels, short stories, and children's books.

== Biography ==
=== Early life, education and family ===
Cyprian Odiatu Duaka Ekwensi, an Igbo, was born in Minna, the capital city of Niger State, north-central Nigeria. He was a native of Nkwelle Ezunaka in Oyi local government area, Anambra State, southeastern Nigeria. His father was David Anadumaka, a storyteller and elephant hunter.

Ekwensi attended Government College in Umuahia, Abia State in southeast Nigeria, Achimota College in Ghana, and the School of Forestry, Ibadan, after which he worked for two years as a forestry officer. He also studied pharmacy at Yaba Technical Institute, Lagos School of Pharmacy, and the Chelsea School of Pharmacy of the University of London. He taught at Igbobi College.

Ekwensi married Eunice Anyiwo, and they had five children. He has many grandchildren, including his son Cyprian Ikechi Ekwensi, who is named after his grandfather, and his oldest grandchild Adrianne Tobechi Ekwensi.

=== Governmental career ===
Ekwensi was employed as Head of Features at the Nigerian Broadcasting Corporation (NBC) and by the Ministry of Information during the First Republic; he eventually became Director of the latter. He resigned his position in 1966, before the Civil War, and defected to Enugu with his family. He later served as chair of the Bureau for External Publicity of Biafra, prior to its reabsorption by Nigeria.

=== Literary career ===
Ekwensi wrote hundreds of short stories (his story "Law of the Grazing Field" was included in An African Treasury, a 1960 anthology edited by Langston Hughes), radio and television scripts, and several dozen novels, including children's books. His 1954 People of the City was his first book to garner international attention. His novel Drummer Boy (1960), based on the life of Benjamin "Kokoro"' Aderounmu, was a perceptive and powerful description of the wandering, homeless and poverty-stricken life of a street artist. Ekwensi's most successful novel was Jagua Nana (1961), about a Pidgin-speaking Nigerian woman who leaves her husband to work as a prostitute in a city and falls in love with a teacher. Ekwensi also wrote a sequel to this, Jagua Nana's Daughter.

In 1968, he received the Dag Hammarskjöld International Prize in Literature. In 2001, he was appointed an MFR and in 2006, he became a fellow of the Nigerian Academy of Letters.

=== Death ===
Ekwensi died on 4 November 2007, aged 86, at the Niger Foundation in Enugu, where he had undergone an operation for an undisclosed ailment. The Association of Nigerian Authors (ANA), having intended to present him with an award on 16 November 2007, converted the honour to a posthumous award.

== Selected works ==
- When Love Whispers (1948)
- An African Night's Entertainment (1948)
- The Boa Suitor (1949)
- The Leopard's Claw (1950)
- People of the City (London: Andrew Dakers, 1954)
- The Drummer Boy (1960)
- The Passport of Mallam Ilia (written 1948, published 1960)
- Jagua Nana (1961)
- Burning Grass (1961)
- An African Night's Entertainment (1962)
- Beautiful Feathers (novel; London: Hutchinson, 1963)
- Rainmaker (short stories; 1965)
- Iska (London: Hutchinson, 1966)
- Lokotown and Other Stories (Heinemann, 1966)
- Restless City and Christmas Gold (1975)
- Divided We Stand: a Novel of the Nigerian Civil War (1980)
- Motherless Baby (Nigeria: Fourth Dimension Publishing Company, 1980)
- For a Roll of Parchment (1986)
- Jagua Nana's Daughter (1987)
- Behind the Convent Wall (1987)
- The Great Elephant Bird (Evans Brothers, 1990)
- Gone to Mecca (Heinemann Educational Books, 1991)
- Jagua Nana's Daughter (1993)
- Masquerade Time (children's book; London: Chelsea House Publishing; Jaws Maui, 1994)
- Cash on Delivery (2007, collection of short stories)
