= Don Bonker =

American politician (1937–2023)

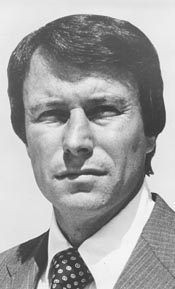

Member of the U.S. House of Representatives from Washington's 3rd district
- In office January 3, 1975 – January 3, 1989
- Preceded by: Julia Butler Hansen
- Succeeded by: Jolene Unsoeld

Personal details
- Born: March 7, 1937 Denver, Colorado, U.S.
- Died: May 30, 2023 (aged 86) Silverdale, Washington, U.S.
- Party: Democratic
- Spouse: Carolyn Ekern (m. 1971)
- Children: 2
- Education: Clark College, Lewis & Clark College, American University

Donald Leroy Bonker (March 7, 1937 – May 30, 2023) was an American politician from the state of Washington. A member of the Democratic Party, he served as county auditor of Clark County, Washington from 1966 to 1974 and a member of the United States House of Representatives for seven terms from 1975 to 1989 representing Washington's 3rd congressional district.

== Early life ==
Bonker attended public schools in Westminster, Colorado. He received his Associate of Arts degree from Clark College in Vancouver, Washington, in 1962; his Bachelor of Arts from Lewis & Clark College in Portland, Oregon, in 1964.

== Political career ==
Bonker served as aide to United States Senate member Maurine Neuberger of Oregon from 1964 to 1965, Clark County auditor in Vancouver, Washington from 1966 to 1974, and as a delegate to Washington State Democratic conventions from 1968 to 1970.

Bonker ran for Washington Secretary of State in 1972, but was defeated by incumbent Republican Party member Lud Kramer.

=== Tenure in Congress ===
Bonker was elected as a moderate Democrat to the 94th and to the six succeeding Congresses (January 3, 1975 – January 3, 1989). He did not run for reelection in 1988 so he could run for nomination to the United States Senate, where he narrowly lost in the primary to Democratic U.S. House of Representatives member Mike Lowry, who was defeated in the general election by former Republican U.S. Senate member Slade Gorton.

During his time in the House, Bonker was a senior member of the United States House Committee on Foreign Affairs and chairman of the Subcommittee on International Economic Policy and Trade. He also served on the President's Export Council and headed former Speaker of the United States House of Representatives Tip O'Neill's Trade Task Force, which led to passage of the Omnibus Trade and Competitiveness Act. During his tenure in Congress, Bonker authored and was a principal sponsor of significant trade legislation, such as the Export Trading Company Act and the Export Administration Act.

Bonker helped establish the Grays Harbor National Wildlife Refuge and the Mount St. Helens National Volcanic Monument, added Protection Island to the National Wildlife Refuge system, preserved the Point of Arches in the Olympic National Park, added 250,000 acres (1000 km^{2}) to the 1984 Washington Wilderness Act, and banned the export of western redcedar.

== Later career ==
In 1992, Bonker again ran for a U.S. Senate seat, but was defeated in the primary by the eventual winner, Democratic U.S. Senate member Patty Murray. In 2000, he ran for Secretary of State again, winning the party nomination in the primary, but losing in the general to Sam Reed.

Bonker was the president and CEO of the International Management and Development Institute, on the board of the Foundation for U.S.-Russia Business Cooperation, and was executive vice president of APCO Worldwide.

In 2009, Bonker was the target of significant criticism by Democrats for endorsing Republican Susan Hutchison for King County Executive against Democratic favorite and eventual winner Dow Constantine.

Bonker was the author of America's Trade Crisis, published by Houghton Mifflin, and was a writer and speaker on foreign trade of the United States. His monthly column on trade policy appeared in a number of newspapers around the country.

Bonker was a member of the ReFormers Caucus of Issue One.

== Personal life ==
Bonker and his wife, Carolyn Ekern, were married in 1971 and had two children.

Bonker was diagnosed with liver cancer in May 2023, and died at the hospital Silverdale, Washington, on May 30 at age 86.

== See also ==
- Washington's congressional delegations

U.S. House of Representatives
Preceded by Julia Butler Hansen	Member of the U.S. House of Representatives from Washington's 3rd congressional district 1975–1989	Succeeded by Jolene Unsoeld
