= Jagua Nana =

1961 novel written by Cyprian Ekwensi

- Author: Cyprian Ekwensi
- Language: English
- Genre: Novel
- Publisher: Heinemann
- Publication date: 1961
- Publication place: Nigeria
- Media type: Print (Paperback)
- Pages: 192 pp

Jagua Nana is a 1961 novel by Nigerian novelist Cyprian Ekwensi. The novel was later republished in 1975 as part of the influential Heinemann African Writers Series.

The novel focuses on the contradictions within the life of an aging sex worker, the title character Jagua Nana. The novel is mainly set in the city of Lagos. The novel has been compared to works by Charles Dickens, in terms of its moral assessment of the city and city life, and its critique of the social problems faced by people living in those cities. Critics of the work in the 1980s noted that the novel relies heavily on stereotypical depictions of women, hampering its depiction of life in Africa. another International edition was published June 26, 2018.

== Plot ==
Jagua Nana is a story about the life and affairs of a Lagos prostitute in her mid-forties. Jagua, in her pursuit of happiness, takes on a much younger boyfriend whom she offers to send to England to study law with her savings on the condition that they become husband and wife. In other adventures she resolves a bloody war between rival village chiefs and becomes an apparently successful political campaigner on behalf of one of her lovers. In the final stages of the novel she returns to her home village, gives birth to a son, and discovers a cache of money which she intends to use to set herself up as a businesswoman ("merchant queen").
