= Predecessor =

Predecessor may refer to:

- Predecessor (graph theory), a term in graph theory
- Predecessor problem, a problem in theoretical computer science
- Predecessor (video game), a 2024 video game
