= Ralph Munro =

American politician (1943–2025)

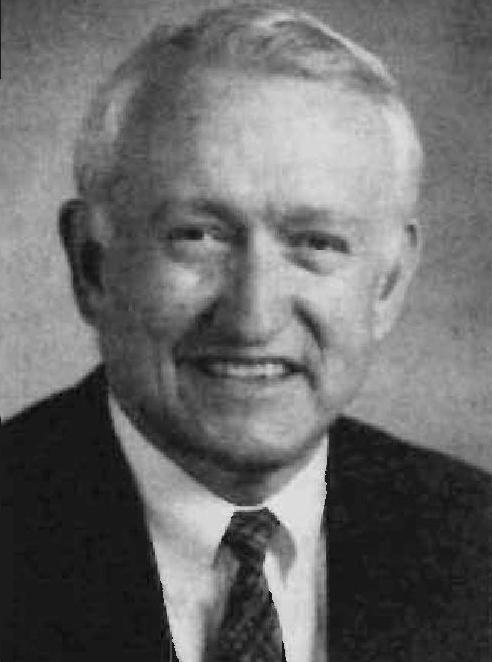

13th Secretary of State of Washington
- In office January 14, 1981 – January 10, 2001
- Governor: John Spellman; Booth Gardner; Mike Lowry; Gary Locke
- Preceded by: Bruce Chapman
- Succeeded by: Sam Reed

Personal details
- Born: Ralph Davies Munro; June 25, 1943 Seattle, Washington, U.S.
- Died: March 20, 2025 (aged 81) Lacey, Washington, U.S.
- Party: Republican
- Education: Western Washington University (BA)

Ralph Davies Munro (June 25, 1943 – March 20, 2025) was an American Republican politician who served as the 13th secretary of state of Washington. First elected in 1980, he served five terms.

== Life and career ==
Munro was born on June 25, 1943, in Seattle, Washington, and grew up on Bainbridge Island. He was a graduate of Western Washington University and held a B.A. in Education and Political Science. Munro's first job with the state was as a supply clerk working in the basement of the Legislative Building. Governor Daniel J. Evans appointed Munro as the state's first volunteer coordinator in 1969.

Munro was a member of the bipartisan Commission on Federal Election Reform, and strongly advocated for expanding vote-by-mail.

In 2022, Munro was awarded the Order of the Rising Sun, Gold Rays with Neck Ribbon in recognition of "his contributions in promoting regional exchange and mutual understanding between Japan and the United States."

He died in Lacey, Washington, on March 20, 2025, at the age of 81.

== Sources ==
- The Legacy Project, Office of the Secretary of State: "History Makers Details on Ralph Munro"
- The Seattle Times, December 29, 2000: "Ralph Munro leaving a career carved in stone";
- Governor's news release, September 25, 2009: "Gov. Gregoire appoints Ralph Munro to WWU board of trustees";
- Puget Sound Business Journal, May 9, 2008: "Mud Bay archeological site has profound lessons for Ralph and Karen Munro"
- Puget Sound Energy, press release June 3, 2008: "PSE recognizes Karen and Ralph Munro with 2008 Pioneer Award"

Preceded by Bruce Chapman	Secretary of State of Washington; 1981–2001	Succeeded by Sam Reed
