= 2025 Washington State Senate special election =

- November 4, 2025

5 of 49 seats in the Washington State Senate 25 seats needed for a majority
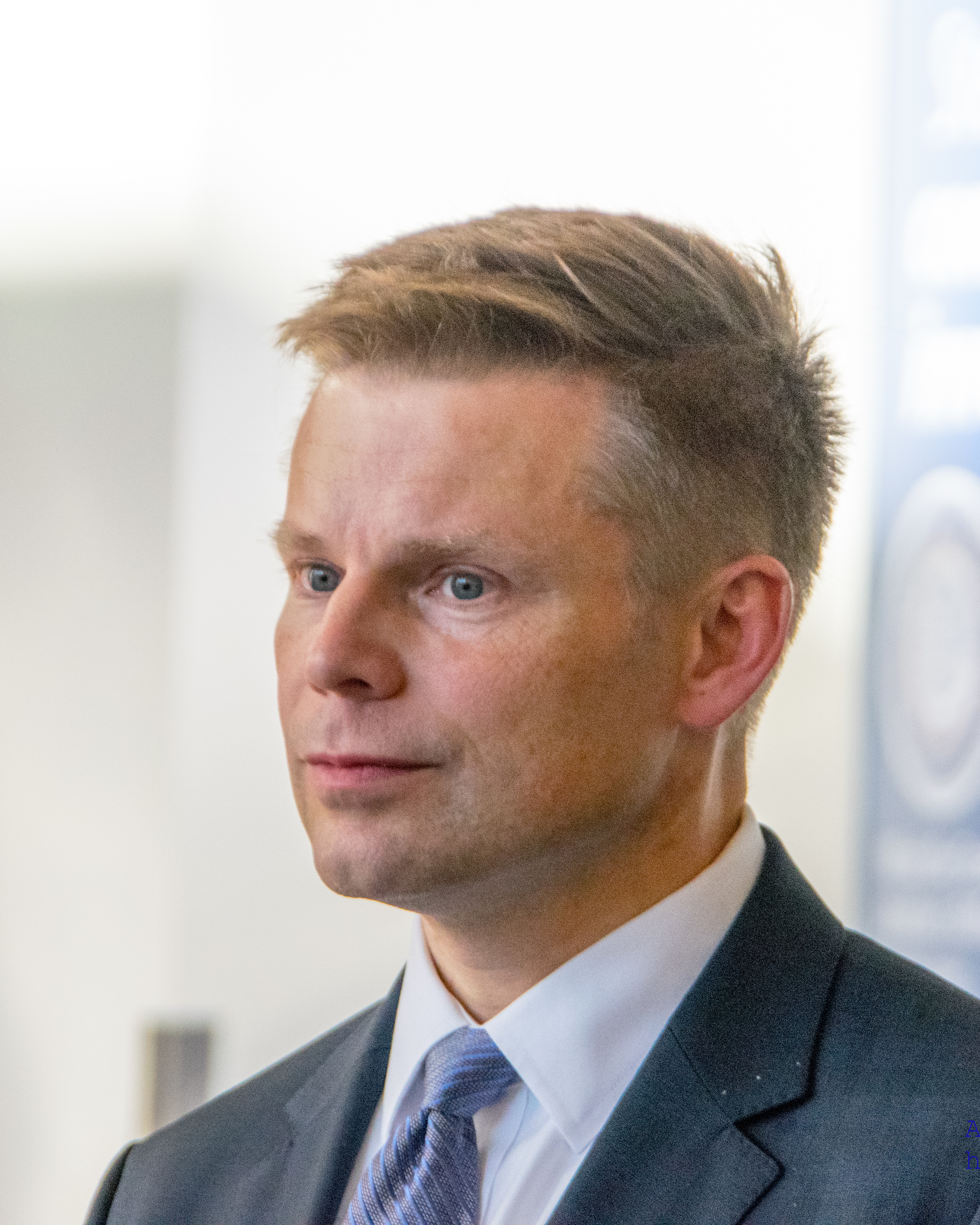

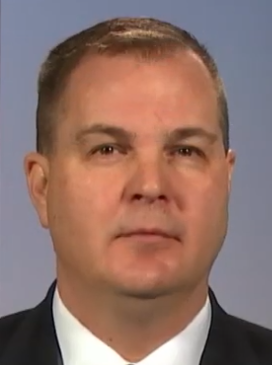
Leader	Jamie Pedersen	John Braun
Party	Democratic	Republican
Leader's seat	43rd	20th
Current seats	30	19
Seats needed	Steady	▲5
Seats up	5	0
- Map of the incumbents: Democratic incumbent No election
Incumbent Senate Majority Leader
Jamie Pedersen
Democratic

A special election in the U.S. state of Washington is scheduled to be held on November 4, 2025, with a nonpartisan blanket primary election being held on August 5, 2025. The election will fill vacancies created after the 2024 general election. Voters in 5 of the 49 state legislative districts will elect senators to the Washington State Senate.

== Summary ==
District	Counties	Incumbent	Interim	Elected	Notes	2024 pres. margin	Candidates
5th	King	Bill Ramos (D)	Victoria Hunt (D)	TBD	Incumbent died on April 19, 2025. Interim senator appointed June 3, 2025.	D+18.9	▌Victoria Hunt (Democratic); ▌Chad Magendanz (Republican)
26th	Kitsap; Pierce	Emily Randall (D)	Deborah Krishnadasan (D)	TBD	Incumbent resigned December 8, 2024, to become a U.S. representative. Interim senator appointed December 11, 2024.	D+9.4	▌Michelle Caldier (Republican); ▌Deborah Krishnadasan (Democratic)
33rd	King	Karen Keiser (D)	Tina Orwall (D)	TBD	Incumbent resigned December 10, 2024. Interim senator appointed December 10, 2024.	D+36.1	▌Tina Orwall (Democratic)
34th	King	Joe Nguyen (D)	Emily Alvarado (D)	TBD	Incumbent resigned January 15, 2025, to lead the Washington State Department of Commerce. Interim senator appointed January 21, 2025.	D+69.6	▌Emily Alvarado (Democratic)
48th	King	Patty Kuderer (D)	Vandana Slatter (D)	TBD	Incumbent resigned January 7, 2025, after being elected as Washington State Insurance Commissioner. Interim senator appointed January 7, 2025.	D+44.9	▌Vandana Slatter (Democratic); ▌Amy Walen (Democratic)

== By district ==
=== District 5 ===
==== Primary ====
Primary election (Unofficial results)
Party	Candidate	Votes	%
Democratic	→ Victoria Hunt (interim)	21,110	54.11%
Republican	→ Chad Magendanz	17,843	45.73%
Write-in		61	0.16%
Total votes		39,014	100.00%

==== General ====
General election
Party	Candidate	Votes	%
Democratic	Victoria Hunt (interim)		
Republican	Chad Magendanz		

=== District 26 ===
==== Primary ====
Primary election (Unofficial results)
Party	Candidate	Votes	%
Democratic	→ Deborah Krishnadasan (interim)	23,048	51.17%
Republican	→ Michelle Caldier	21,897	48.62%
Write-in		94	0.21%
Total votes		45,039	100.00%

==== General ====
General election
Party	Candidate	Votes	%
Democratic	Deborah Krishnadasan (interim)		
Republican	Michelle Caldier		

=== District 33 ===
==== Primary ====
Primary election (Unofficial results)
Party	Candidate	Votes	%
Democratic	→ Tina Orwall (interim)	17,726	94.92%
Write-in		948	5.08%
Total votes		18,674	100.00%

==== General ====
General election
Party	Candidate	Votes	%
Democratic	Tina Orwall (interim)		

=== District 34 ===
==== Primary ====
Primary election (Unofficial results)
Party	Candidate	Votes	%
Democratic	→ Emily Alvarado (interim)	30,548	97.10%
Write-in		913	2.90%
Total votes		31,461	100.00%

==== General ====
General election
Party	Candidate	Votes	%
Democratic	Emily Alvarado (interim)		

=== District 48 ===
==== Primary ====
Primary election (Unofficial results)
Party	Candidate	Votes	%
Democratic	→ Vandana Slatter (interim)	13,938	59.63%
Democratic	→ Amy Walen	8,966	38.36%
Write-in		471	2.01%
Total votes		23,375	100.00%

==== General ====
General election
Party	Candidate	Votes	%
Democratic	Vandana Slatter (interim)		
Democratic	Amy Walen		
