= Chad Magendanz =

American politician (born 1967)

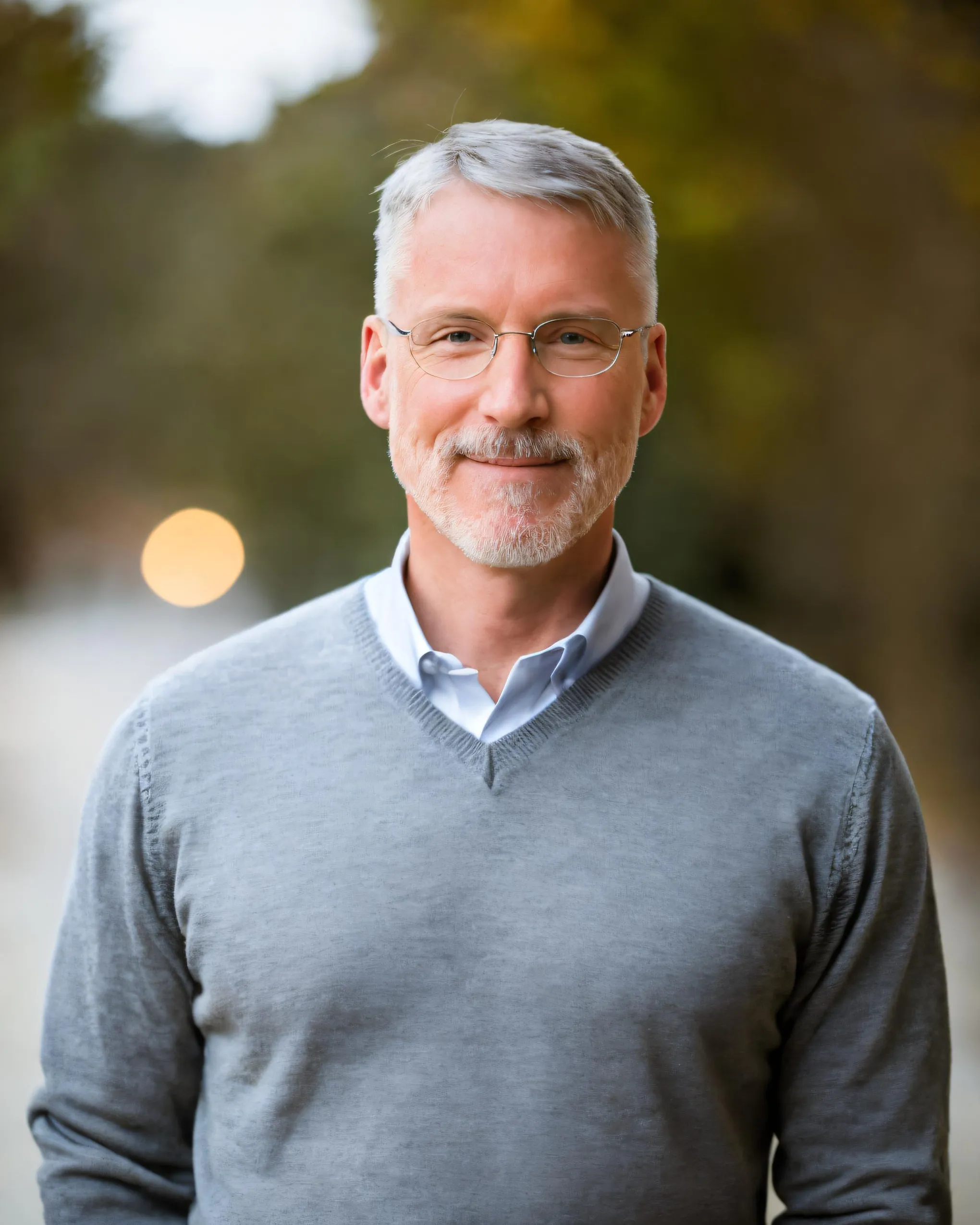

Member of the Washington House of Representatives from the 5th district
- In office January 14, 2013 – January 9, 2017
- Preceded by: Glenn Anderson
- Succeeded by: Paul Graves

Personal details
- Born: Chad Lee Magendanz; May 24, 1967 (age 59) New York City, New York, U.S.
- Party: Republican
- Spouse: Galen Pierce Magendanz
- Education: Cornell University (BEE)
- Website: Official

Military service
- Allegiance: United States
- Branch/service: United States Navy
- Years of service: 1985 – 1997
- Rank: Lieutenant (navy)

Chad Lee Magendanz (born May 24, 1967) is an American politician who served in the Washington House of Representatives for the 5th district as a Republican from 2013 to 2017.

== Education ==
Magendanz enrolled in Cornell University in 1985 and graduated with a BS in electrical engineering. After graduating, Magendanz served in the United States Navy until 1997 as a nuclear submarine officer. He earned his Master of Arts in teaching from Central Washington University in the spring of 2021.

== Personal life ==
He and his wife of 35 years reside in Issaquah, Washington, and have two sons.

== Political career ==
Magendanz was appointed to the Issaquah School Board in 2008, and elected to that position in 2009. He served as the school board legislative representative from 2009 to 2010 and was elected president from 2011 to 2012. He was sworn into the Washington House of Representatives in 2013, representing the 5th district, a position he held until 2017. In 2016, Magendanz ran for a seat in the Washington State Senate and lost the race to the incumbent, Mark Mullet.

In 2018, he was defeated by Democrat Bill Ramos in the race for State House Position 1. In 2022, Magendanz challenged incumbent Lisa Callan for House District 5-Position 2 but was again defeated. In 2024, he ran for the State Senate seat in District 5 but lost to Ramos.

On May 6, 2025, Magendanz entered the race against Democrat Victoria Hunt to fill the vacant seat left by Bill Ramos after Ramos's death in April. Hunt was appointed to the seat on June 3, 2025. She and Magendanz ran in the November general election for the full term. In November 2025, Magendanz was defeated by Hunt in the general election.

Magendanz was endorsed by The Seattle Times in 2012, 2014, 2018, 2022, 2024 and 2025. He consistently maintained an "Outstanding" rating from the Municipal League of King County.

=== Electoral history ===
==== 2012 Washington House of Representatives, District 5-Position 2 ====
General election, November 6, 2012
Party	Candidate	Votes	%	±%
Republican	Chad Magendanz	35,961	55.2	
Democratic	David Spring	29,156	44.8	
Total votes		65,117	100.0	

==== 2014 Washington House of Representatives, District 5-Position 2 ====
General election, November 4, 2014
Party	Candidate	Votes	%	±%
Republican	Chad Magendanz (incumbent)	26,287	59.0	▲3.8 (vs. 2012)
Democratic	David Spring	18,259	41.0	▼3.8 (vs. 2012)
Total votes		44,546	100.0	

==== 2016 Washington State Senate, District 5 ====
General election, November 8, 2016
Party	Candidate	Votes	%	±%
Democratic	Mark Mullet (incumbent)	37,342	50.4	
Republican	Chad Magendanz	36,826	49.6	
Total votes		74,168	100.0	

==== 2018 Washington House of Representatives, District 5-Position 1 ====
General election, November 6, 2018
Party	Candidate	Votes	%	±%
Democratic	Bill Ramos	38,972	51.5	
Republican	Chad Magendanz	36,692	48.5	▼10.5 (vs. 2014)
Total votes		75,664	100.0	

==== 2022 Washington House of Representatives, District 5-Position 2 ====
General election, November 8, 2022
Party	Candidate	Votes	%	±%
Democratic	Lisa Callan (incumbent)	38,030	53.8	
Republican	Chad Magendanz	32,528	46.1	▼2.4 (vs. 2018)
	Write-in	73	0.1	
Total votes		70,631	100.0	

==== 2024 Washington State Senate, District 5 ====
General election, November 5, 2024
Party	Candidate	Votes	%	±%
Democratic	Bill Ramos	44,393	52.0	
Republican	Chad Magendanz	40,966	48.0	
	Write-in	66	0.1	
Total votes		85,425	100.0	

==== 2025 Washington State Senate, District 5 (Special Election) ====
Special general election, November 4, 2025
Party	Candidate	Votes	%	±%
Democratic	Victoria Hunt (incumbent)	28,402	56.3	
Republican	Chad Magendanz	22,005	43.6	▼4.4 (vs. 2024)
	Write-in	62	0.1	
Total votes		50,469	100.0	

Source: Ballotpedia

== Legislative career ==
The Washington Cybercrime Act, which Magendanz co-sponsored, updates current statues to help prosecute crimes of electronic data interference, data theft, spoofing and tampering in the first and second degree. Magendanz also co-sponsored House Bill 2573, which sought to alleviate teacher shortages by helping with recruitment and retention and by removing barriers for out-of-state teachers to be certified in Washington.

== Computer science career ==
Magendanz worked at Microsoft as a software developer. Magendanz currently teaches computer science in the Bellevue School District at International School.
