= Zach Hall =

American politician (born 1994/95)

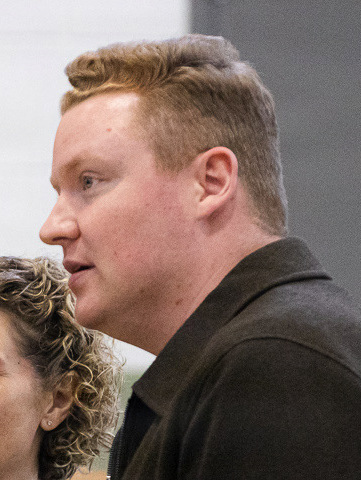
- Hall in 2026

Member of the Washington House of Representatives from the 5th district
- Incumbent
- Assumed office June 3, 2025 Serving with Lisa Callan
- Preceded by: Victoria Hunt

Personal details
- Born: 1994 or 1995 (age 31–32) Issaquah, Washington
- Party: Democratic
- Education: University of Washington (BS, MPA)

Zach Hall (born 1994 or 1995) is an American politician serving as a member of the Washington House of Representatives from the 5th district since 2025. A Democrat, he was appointed to succeed Victoria Hunt, who was appointed to the Washington State Senate to fill the vacancy left by the death of Bill Ramos.

== Early life and education ==
A lifelong resident of Issaquah, Hall attended Issaquah public schools and graduated from Issaquah High School in 2013. He graduated from the University of Washington with a Bachelor of Science in biology in 2017 and a Master of Public Administration in 2024.

== Career ==
Hall previously worked as campaign manager for Mary Lou Pauly's mayoral campaign, then as campaign manager and legislative aide for Lisa Callan.

=== Issaquah City Council ===
He was elected to the Issaquah City Council in 2019 then re-elected in 2023. In 2022, the council elected him as deputy council president. In 2024, he voted to approve a tax exemption intended to spur construction of transit-oriented development and denser mixed-use housing near the city's planned Link light rail station.

=== Washington House of Representatives ===
In 2025, the King County Council selected state representative Victoria Hunt to fill the vacancy left by the death of state senator Bill Ramos; Hall was selected to fill Hunt's term. Because he was appointed after the filing deadline for other 2025 special legislative elections, he will serve through 2026.

== Personal life ==
Zach and his partner, Tyler, live in the Newport neighborhood of Issaquah.
