= Paul Graves =

American lawyer and politician from Washington

Member of the Washington House of Representatives from the 5th district
- In office January 9, 2017 – January 14, 2019
- Preceded by: Chad Magendanz
- Succeeded by: Lisa Callan

Personal details
- Born: Paul Spencer Graves; 1982 (age 43–44) Maple Valley, Washington
- Party: Republican
- Spouse: Jenny
- Children: 2
- Education: Western Washington University (BA); Duke University (JD, MA)
- Profession: Lawyer
- Website: Official

Paul Spencer Graves (born 1982) is an American attorney and politician. A Republican, he served in the Washington House of Representatives, for the 5th legislative district.

== Early life, education, and career ==
Before becoming a State Representative, Graves worked as an attorney at Perkins Coie LLP.

Following his departure from the State Legislature, Graves became president of Enterprise Washington, a pro-business lobbying organization based in Bellevue, Washington. He also served as the House Republican Caucus Appointee to the 2021-22 Washington State Redistricting Commission, and currently works as in-house counsel to Oak Harbor Freight Lines, a trucking company based in Auburn, Washington.

== Washington House of Representatives ==
Graves ran for the House seat following the announcement of the retirement of Representative Chad Magendanz. Graves defeated Darcy Burner in the general election in 2016. In 2018, Graves lost re-election to Lisa Callan, a Democrat, as both House positions in the 5th District flipped from Republicans to Democrats.

In the legislature, Graves was known for sponsoring legislation that would make the records of the legislature public.

== See also ==
Paul Graves at Ballotpedia
