= Glenn Anderson (Washington politician) =

American politician

Member of the Washington House of Representatives from the 5th district
- In office January 10, 2001 – January 14, 2013
- Preceded by: Brian C. Thomas
- Succeeded by: Chad Magendanz

Personal details
- Born: March 24, 1958 (age 68)
- Party: Republican
- Spouse: Elisabeth Anderson

Edwin Glenn Anderson (born March 24, 1958) from Fall City, Washington is an American politician. A member of the Republican Party, he served in the Washington House of Representatives, representing the 5th district.

== Personal life ==
Anderson's wife is Elisabeth Anderson. Anderson and his family live in Fall City, Washington.
