= Lisa Callan =

American politician

Member of the Washington House of Representatives from the 5th district
- Incumbent
- Assumed office January 14, 2019 Serving with Bill Ramos (2019-2025); Victoria Hunt (2025); Zach Hall (2025-present)
- Preceded by: Paul Graves

Personal details
- Born: Lisa Williams Arizona, U.S.
- Party: Democratic
- Education: Northern Arizona University (BS)
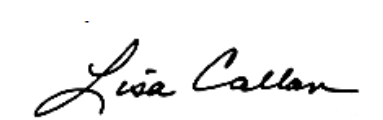
- Signature

Lisa Callan is a Democratic member of the Washington Legislature representing the State's 5th House district for position 2. Callan has held office since 2019 after being elected in 2018 and re-elected in 2020.

== Career ==
Callan has a bachelor's degree from Northern Arizona University in mathematics and computer science. She worked as an engineer at Boeing and then as a software developer in the technology sector. She served on the Issaquah School Board.

Callan won the general election in November 2018 to a secure a seat in the Washington House of Representatives. She secured fifty-two percent of the vote while her closest rival, Republican Paul Graves, secured forty-eight percent.

Callan won re-election to the State House on November 3, 2020.

== Notable legislation ==
Callan voted in favor of HB 1589, which is described as supporting Washington's clean energy economy and transitioning to a clean, affordable, and reliable energy future by prohibiting the expansion of natural gas services and other regulations on natural gas companies.

Callan voted in favor of and sponsored HB 1054, which is described as establishing requirements for tactics and equipment used by peace officers by adding restrictions on vehicular pursuits, as well as prohibiting law enforcement from using chokeholds, the deployment of tear gas, or unleashed police dogs in the arrest or apprehension of suspects.
