= Washington's congressional districts =

U.S. House districts in the state of Washington

Map of Washington's congressional districts from 2023 Interactive map version

The following is a list of the ten congressional districts in the U.S. state of Washington. From the time that Washington Territory was formed in 1853, through statehood in 1889, Washington Territory elected an at-large non-voting Delegate to the United States House of Representatives. At different times in its history, the state of Washington has also elected one or more representatives At-large statewide. Washington gained its 10th district following reapportionment after the 2010 census.

== Current districts and representatives ==
This is a list of United States representatives from Washington, their terms, their district boundaries, and the district political ratings according to the CPVI. The delegation has a total of 10 members, including 8 Democrats and 2 Republicans.

Current U.S. representatives from Washington
District	Member (Residence)	Party	Incumbent since	CPVI (2025)	District map
1st	Suzan DelBene (Medina)	Democratic	November 13, 2012	D+15	
2nd	Rick Larsen (Everett)	Democratic	January 3, 2001	D+12	
3rd	Marie Gluesenkamp Perez (Washougal)	Democratic	January 3, 2023	R+2	
4th	Dan Newhouse (Sunnyside)	Republican	January 3, 2015	R+10	
5th	Michael Baumgartner (Spokane)	Republican	January 3, 2025	R+5	
6th	Emily Randall (Bremerton)	Democratic	January 3, 2025	D+10	
7th	Pramila Jayapal (Seattle)	Democratic	January 3, 2017	D+39	
8th	Kim Schrier (Sammamish)	Democratic	January 3, 2019	D+3	
9th	Adam Smith (Bellevue)	Democratic	January 3, 1997	D+22	
10th	Marilyn Strickland (Tacoma)	Democratic	January 3, 2021	D+9	

== Historical and present district boundaries ==
Table of United States congressional district boundary maps in the State of Washington, presented chronologically. All redistricting events that took place in Washington between 1973 and 2013 are shown.

Year	Statewide map	Puget Sound highlight
1973–1982		
1983–1984		
1985–1992		
1993–2002		
2003–2013		
2013–2023		

=== Obsolete districts ===
- Washington Territory's at-large congressional district
- Washington's at-large congressional district

== State redistricting procedures ==
Washington is one of 22 states that do not give direct control of redistricting to the state's legislature. The state's congressional districts are determined by a four-member Washington State Redistricting Commission that is appointed every ten years. Two members are appointed by both of the state's legislative branches, with the majority leader and minority leader from each selecting one person. The four appointed members then vote to appoint a fifth, non-partisan chairperson that cannot vote. The commission is disbanded once they have approved a redistricting plan.

In 1981 Republicans attempted to gerrymander Tom Foley's fifth district by splitting Spokane (the district's main population center) into two districts, but this was vetoed by Governor John Spellman. After they redrew districts in 1982, a federal court threw out the map for excessive population variation. New maps were drawn in 1983 by a five-member commission appointed by the legislature to avoid continued deadlock under a court-imposed deadline; the legislature had historically often failed to redistrict. In 1983, the voters approved a ballot measure to amend the state constitution to permanently establish a redistricting commission. The first commission created under the changes completed their work as part of the 1991 redistricting.

== See also ==
- List of United States congressional districts
- Washington legislative districts
