= Washington State Redistricting Commission =

US body charged with redistricting

The Washington State Redistricting Commission is a decennial body charged with redrawing congressional and legislative districts in the state of Washington after each census. On November 8, 1983, Washington state passed the 74th amendment to its constitution via Senate Joint Resolution 103 to permanently establish the Redistricting Commission. Earlier that year the first commission redrew the state's congressional map after the previous one drawn by the legislature was ruled unconstitutional. Since the 1990 census, a committee of four appointees of the majority and minority leaders of the House and Senate appoint a fifth member as non-voting chair, and meet to redistributes representative seats in for both Washington's congressional and state legislative districts according to census results.

== History of Redistricting in Washington State ==
=== Early Redistricting ===
==== Statehood-1920s ====
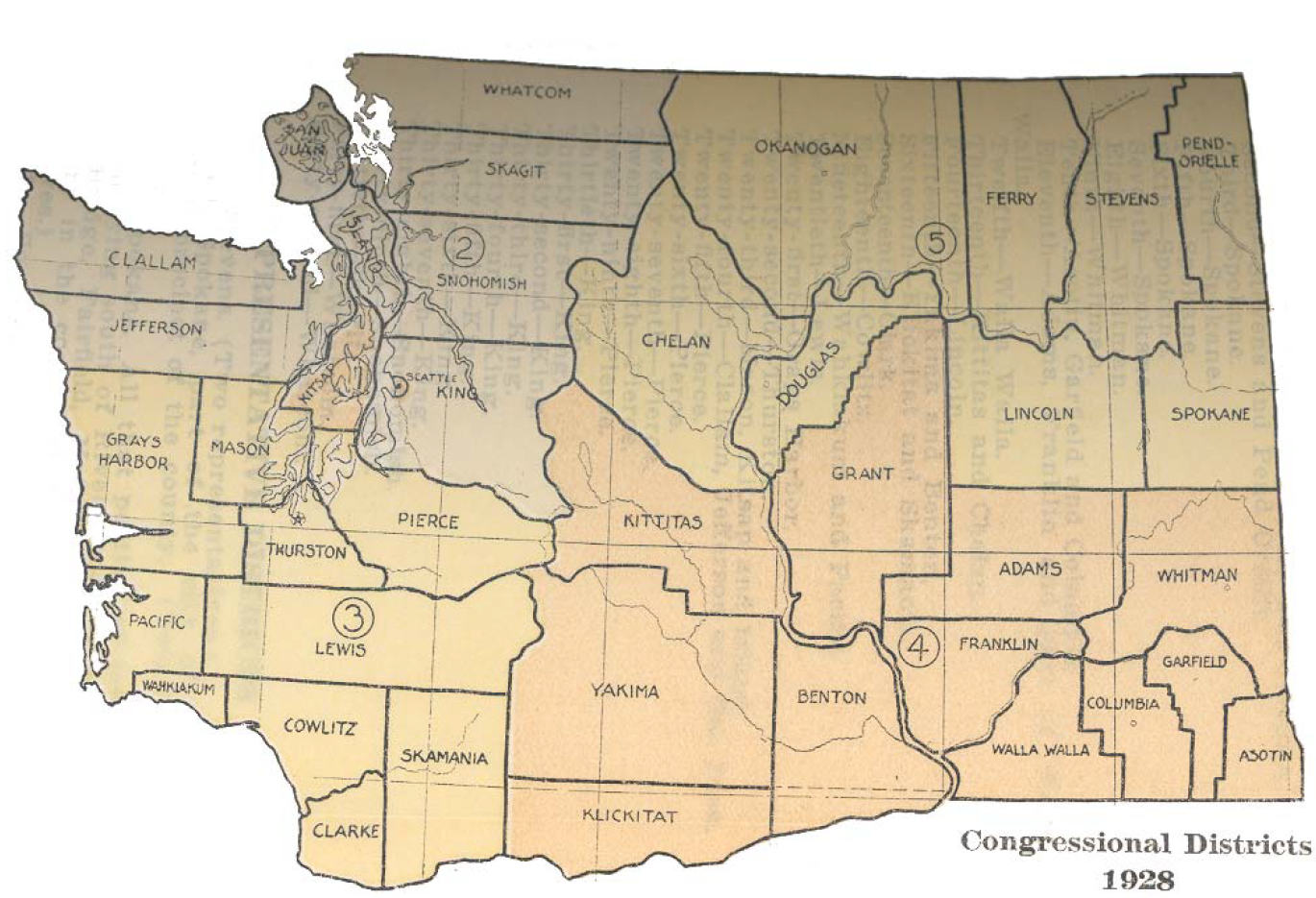
1928 US House district map for Washington State

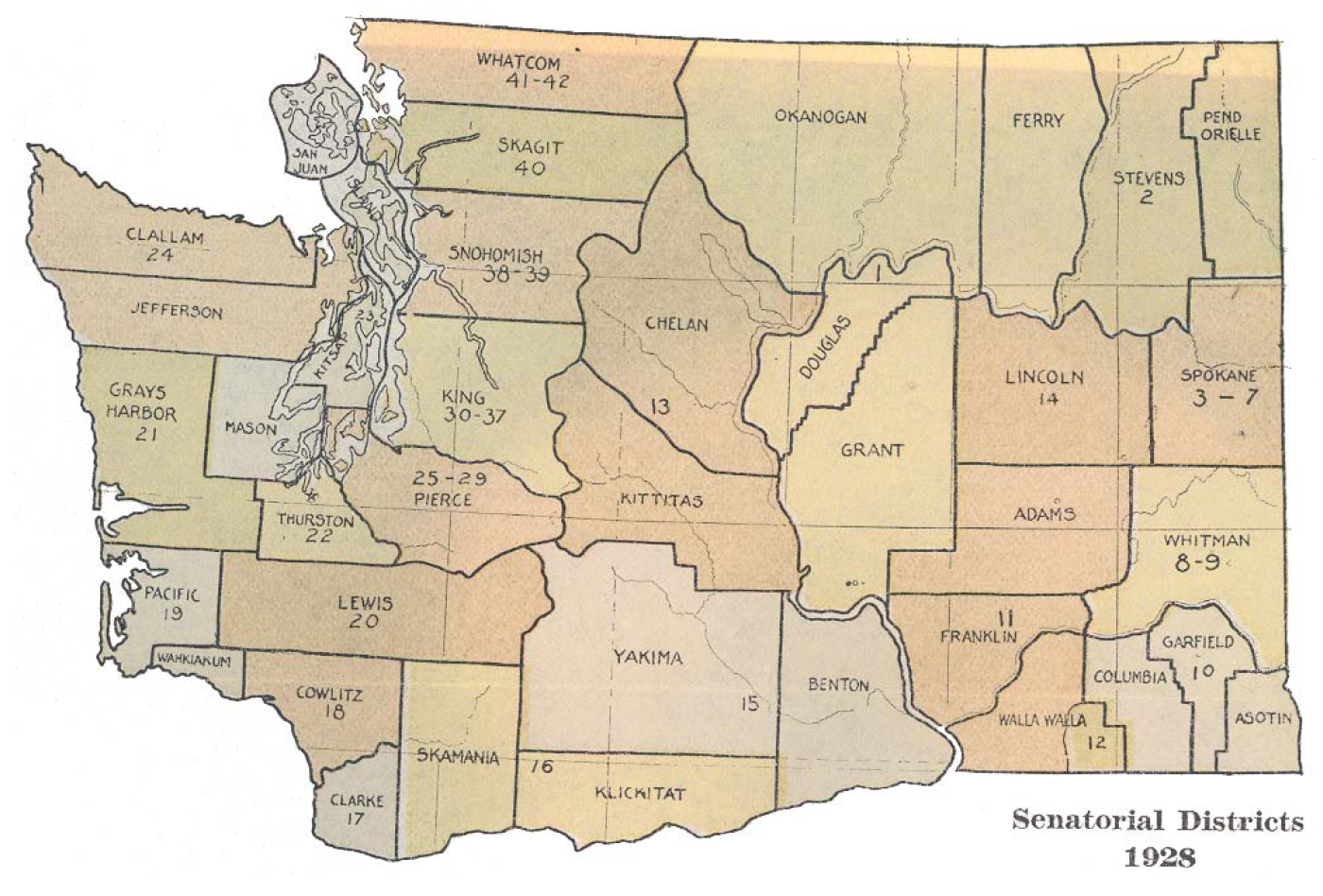
1928 Washington State Senate district map

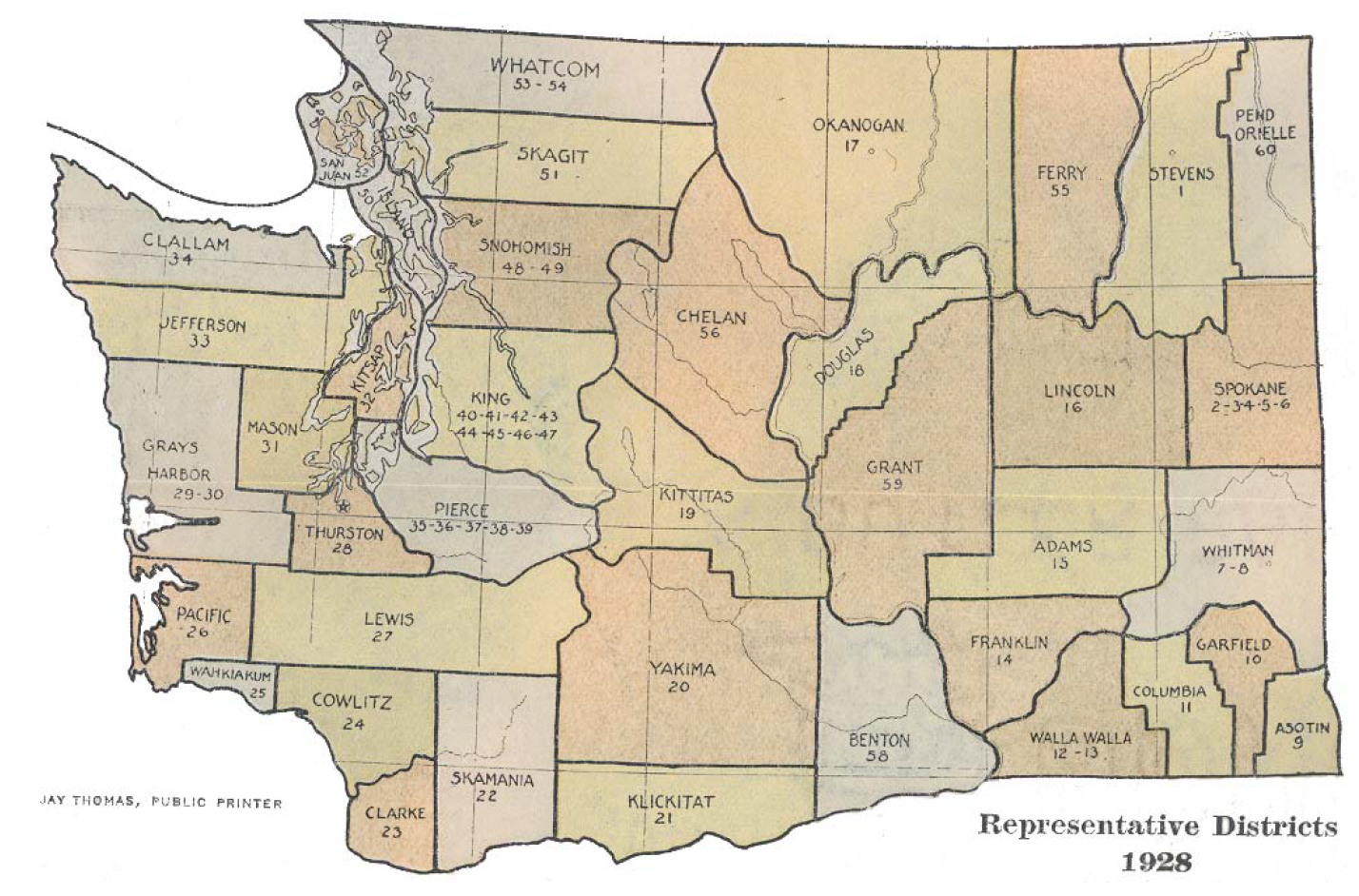
1928 Washington State House district map

When Washington became a state, the legislature created 34 single member senatorial districts and 49 representative districts which elected between one and three representatives for a total of 78 representatives. In 1901, the legislature redistricted the state to have 42 senate districts and 56 representative districts over the veto of Governor John Rankin Rogers. From 1901 until 1931, Washington only made minor adjustments the boundaries of the state legislative districts, while adding senators and representatives for new counties.

From statehood until 1909, Washington elected all of its congressional representatives from one at-large district. After the 1890 census, Washington's first as a state, it was granted a second congressional seat and it received a third congressional seat after the 1900 census. All three seats remained at-large until the legislature passed a bill that created the 1st, 2nd, and 3rd congressional districts as single-member districts which was signed into law on March 15, 1907 by Governor Albert Mead. The 1st District represented all of King County, Kitsap County, and Northwest Washington, the 2nd District represented all of Pierce County, Thurston County, the Kitsap and Olympic Peninsulas, and Southwest Washington while the 3rd District represented Eastern Washington.

Following the 1910 census, Washington gained an additional two congressional districts, the only time the state has added more than one congressional seat during reapportionment. However, the legislature did not redraw the state's congressional districts in time for the 1912 election. As a result, congressional seats 4 and 5 were elected at-large with both seats on the same ticket and the top two vote getters being elected.

In 1913, the legislature passed legislation that created the 4th and 5th congressional districts and redistricted the state's other congressional districts. The districts were both created primarily in Eastern Washington with the 4th District comprising the southern counties in Eastern Washington and the 5th District comprising the northern counties. The creation of the new districts lead to the 3rd district, which had represented the entirety of Eastern Washington, being redrawn to cover Southwest Washington plus Mason, Pierce, and Thurston Counties. The 2nd District was redrawn to represent Northwest Washington, Clallam County, Jefferson County, and King County outside of Seattle while the 1st District represented Seattle and Kitsap County.

==== 1930s redistricting ====
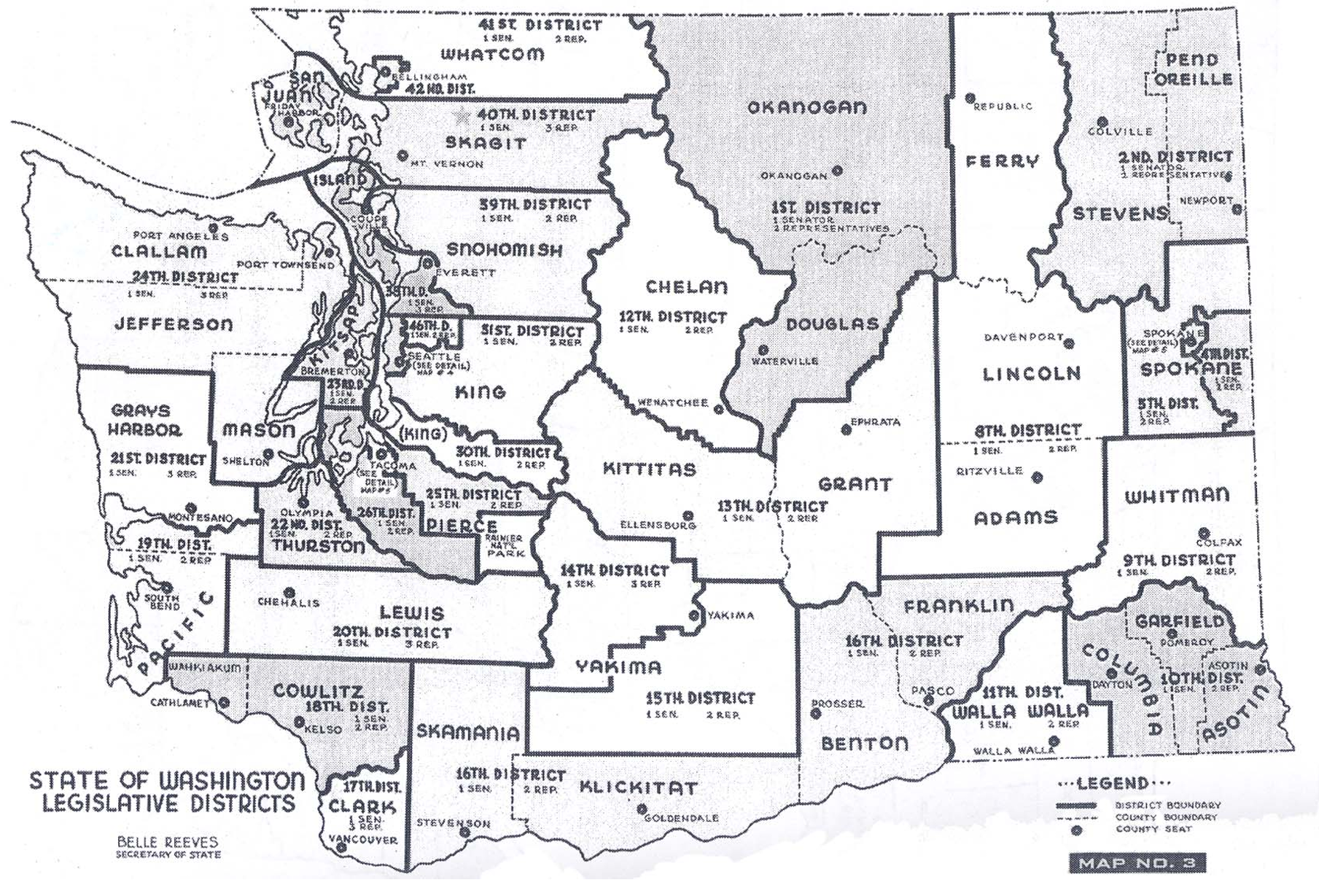
1931 Washington legislative district map

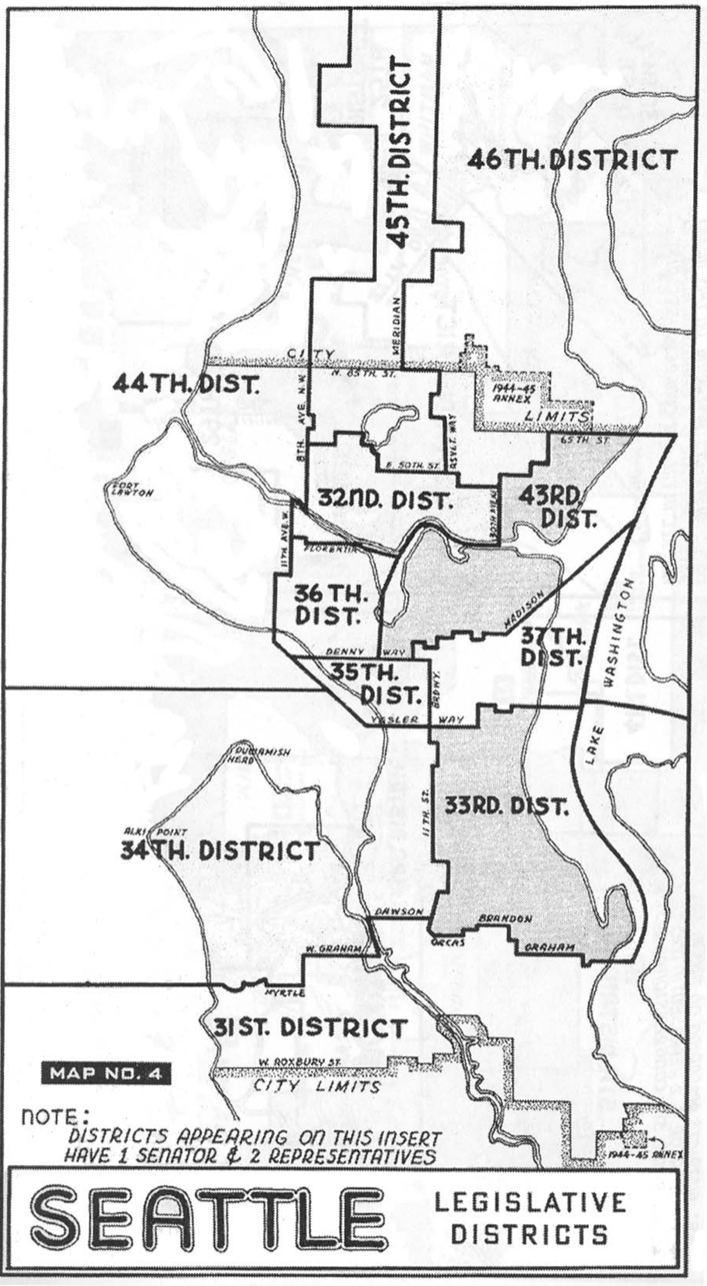
1931 Washington legislative district map for Seattle

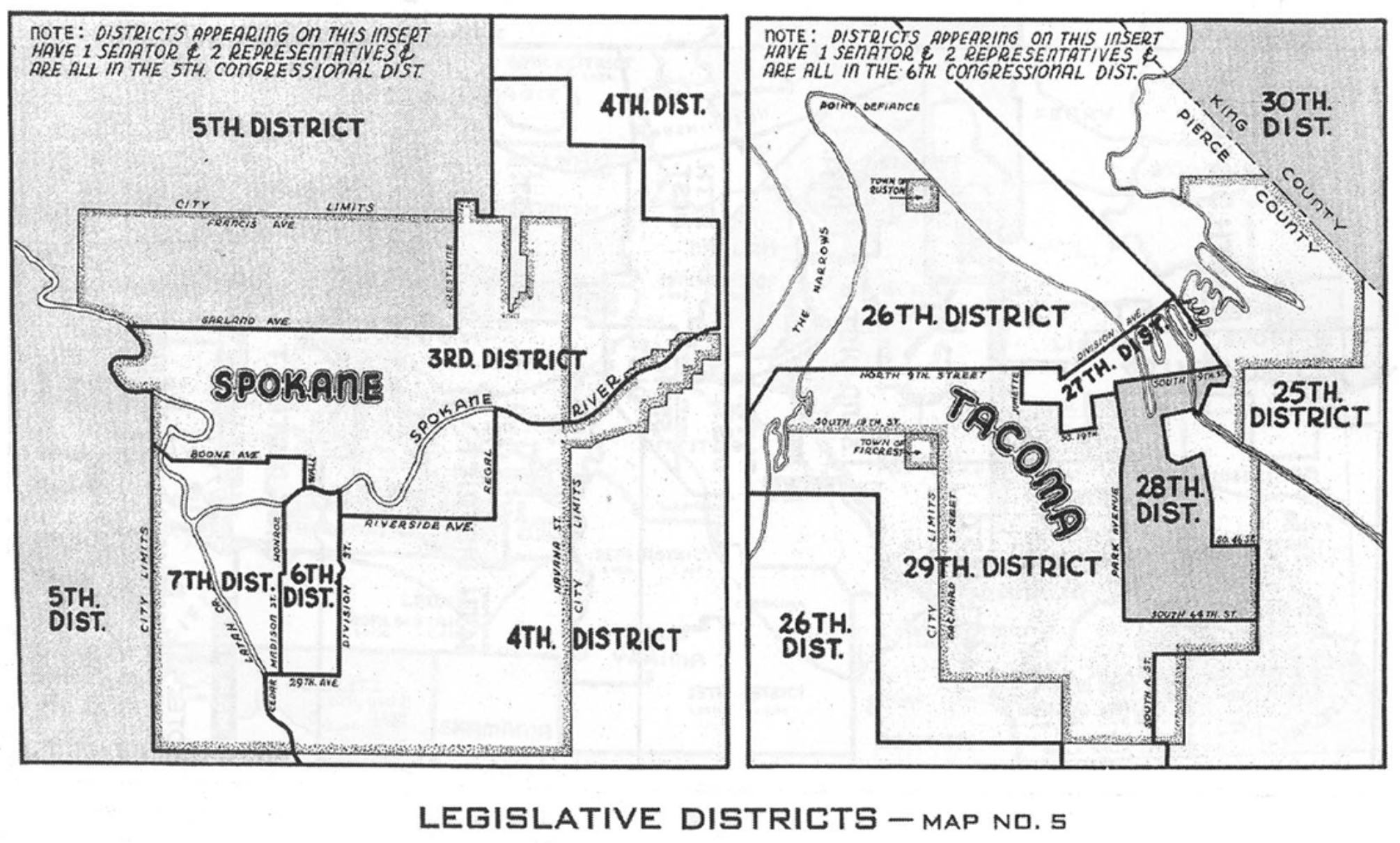
1931 Washington legislative district map for Spokane and Tacoma

After no major changes were made to state legislative districts since 1901, in 1930, ballot initiative 57 was put on the ballot. The initiative sought to redistrict the state's legislative districts, and increased the number of senators from 42 to 46 and the number of representatives from 97 to 99. It faced opposition from Secretary of State Jay Hinkle who did not think it was constitutional to redistrict via voter initiative, but the Washington Supreme Court overturned his opinion.

Initiative 57 was passed with 50.17% voting in favor and 49.83% against with a margin of 795 votes. Prior to initiative 57, the state senate and state house districts were distinct, but with its passage, the senate and house districts were merged. While each district still elected one senator, they remained unequal in the number of representatives elected ranging from one to three.

After Washington did not gain a congressional seat from the 1920 census, the 1930 census apportioned a 6th seat in congress to the state. In the 1931 legislative session, the legislature created Washington's 6th congressional district by redrawing only the 1st and 3rd districts. The new 6th District represented Kitsap, Pierce, and South King Counties.

==== 1950s redistricting ====
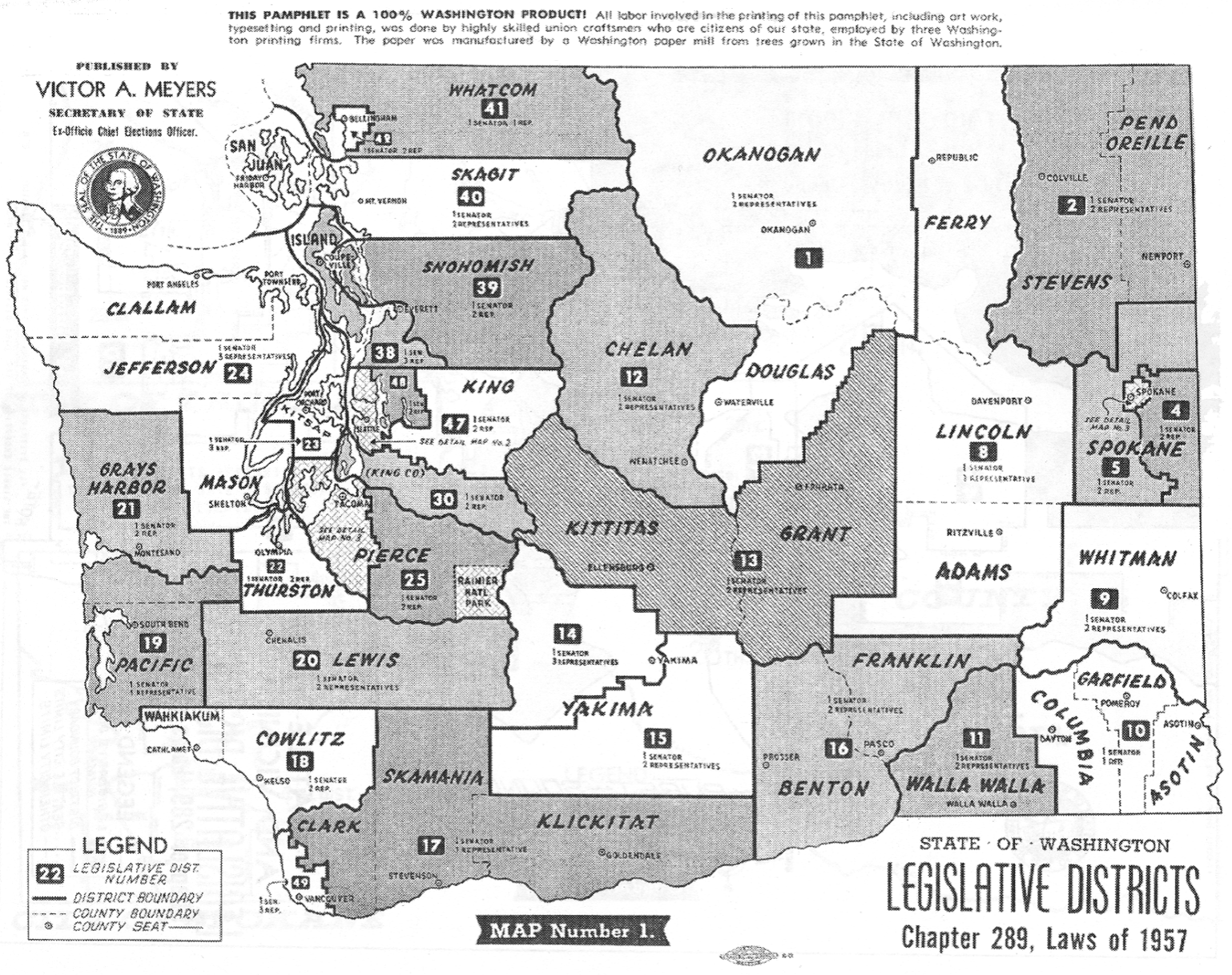
1957 Washington legislative district map

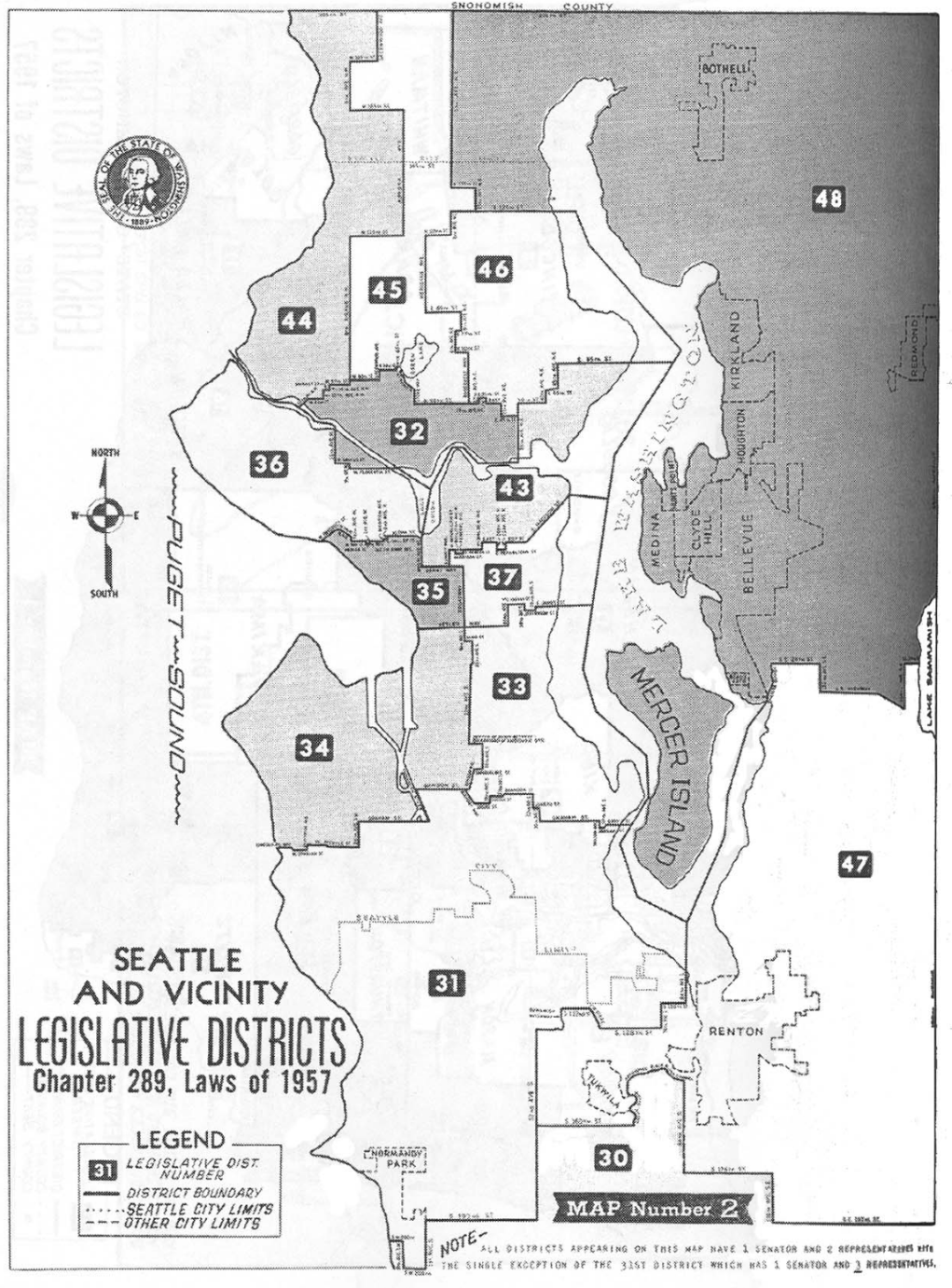
1957 Washington legislative district map for Seattle

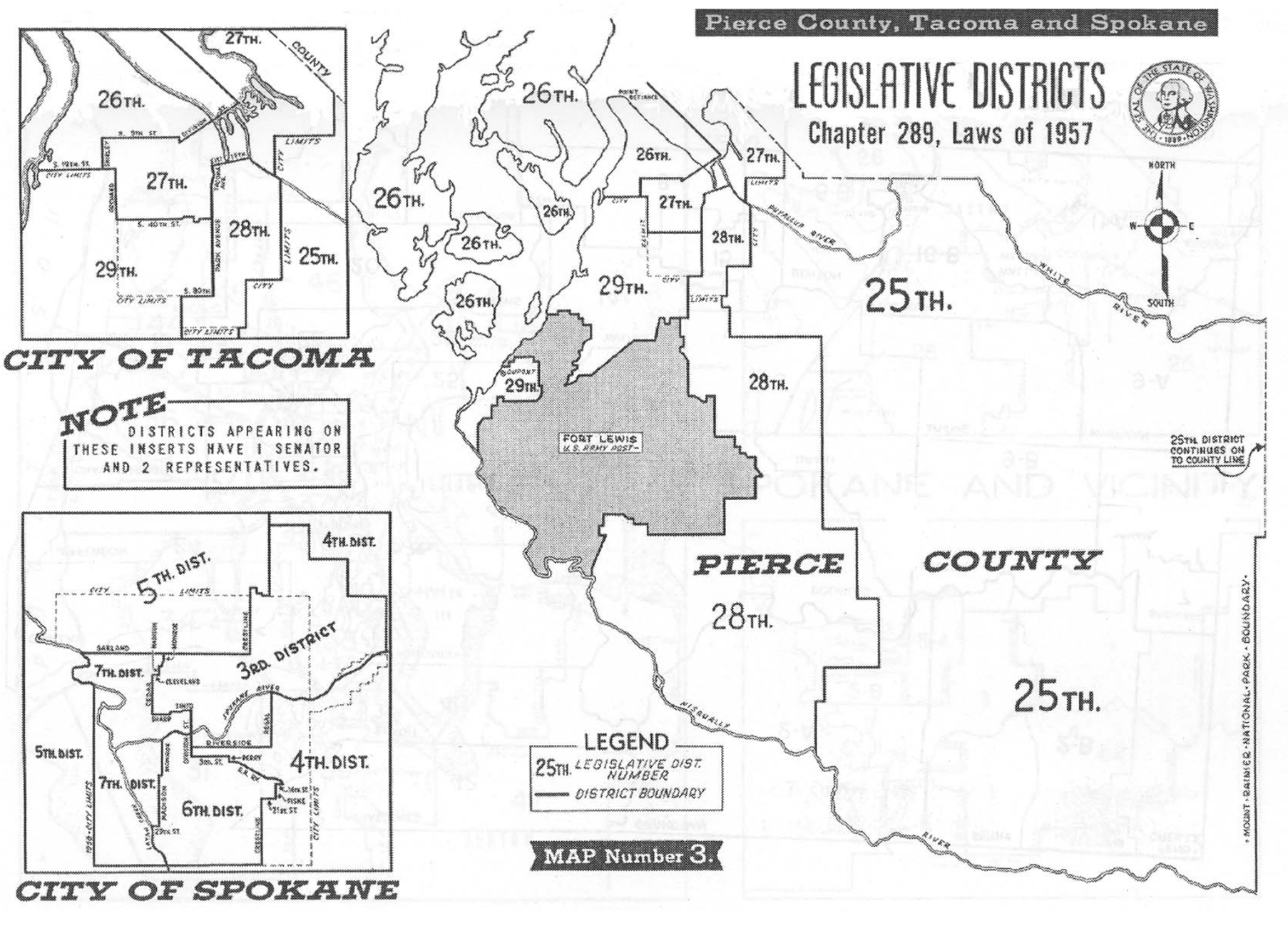
1957 Washington legislative district map for Pierce County, Tacoma, and Spokane

From 1930 to 1956, the state legislature only made minor adjustments to the state legislative boundaries. In the 1950 census, Washington had been apportioned a 7th seat in congress, but the legislature failed to pass a redistricting law, so the seat was elected at-large through the 1956 elections. In 1954 the legislature passed a resolution creating a bipartisan redistricting committee intended to reapportion the state's districts. The committee failed to pass a plan prompting the League of Women Voters to place initiative 199 on the ballot in November 1956. Initiative 199 created 49 legislative districts with each electing one senator and two representatives except for the 31st district which elected three representatives. Despite another attempt in 1962 with initiative 211, this was the last time that Washington's legislative districts were redrawn directly by a ballot initiative.

The passage of initiative 199 at the ballot box threatened a large number of legislative incumbents, so Senate Majority Leader Bob Greive pushed to amend the redistricting plan. Since the plan was passed by an initiative, a 2/3rds majority in both houses of the legislature was needed to amend the plan. Despite Democrats having a 31-15 majority in the Senate and only a 56-43 majority in the House, Greive's effort successfully made it through the legislature. Governor Albert Rosellini was skeptical of the plan, but allowed it pass into law without his signature. In December 1957, the Washington Supreme Court upheld the legislature's new maps which redrew a majority of the seats in the legislature and created Washington's 7th congressional district. The new 7th District was drawn to include the Downtown Seattle, Capitol Hill, South and West Seattle, Mercer Island, Renton, Vashon Island, and all of Kitsap County except for Bainbridge Island primarily displacing the 1st and 6th districts.

At the end of the 1957 legislative session, Senate Joint Resolution 12 was passed by the legislature and placed on the ballot in November 1958. If approved by voters, it would have created a seven-member redistricting commission made up of the Secretary of State, three gubernatorial appointees, two legislators, and a representative of the Washington Supreme Court. The measure was backed by the League of Women Voters, but only earned 47% of the vote and did not pass.

=== Equal Apportionment Era ===
==== 1960s redistricting ====
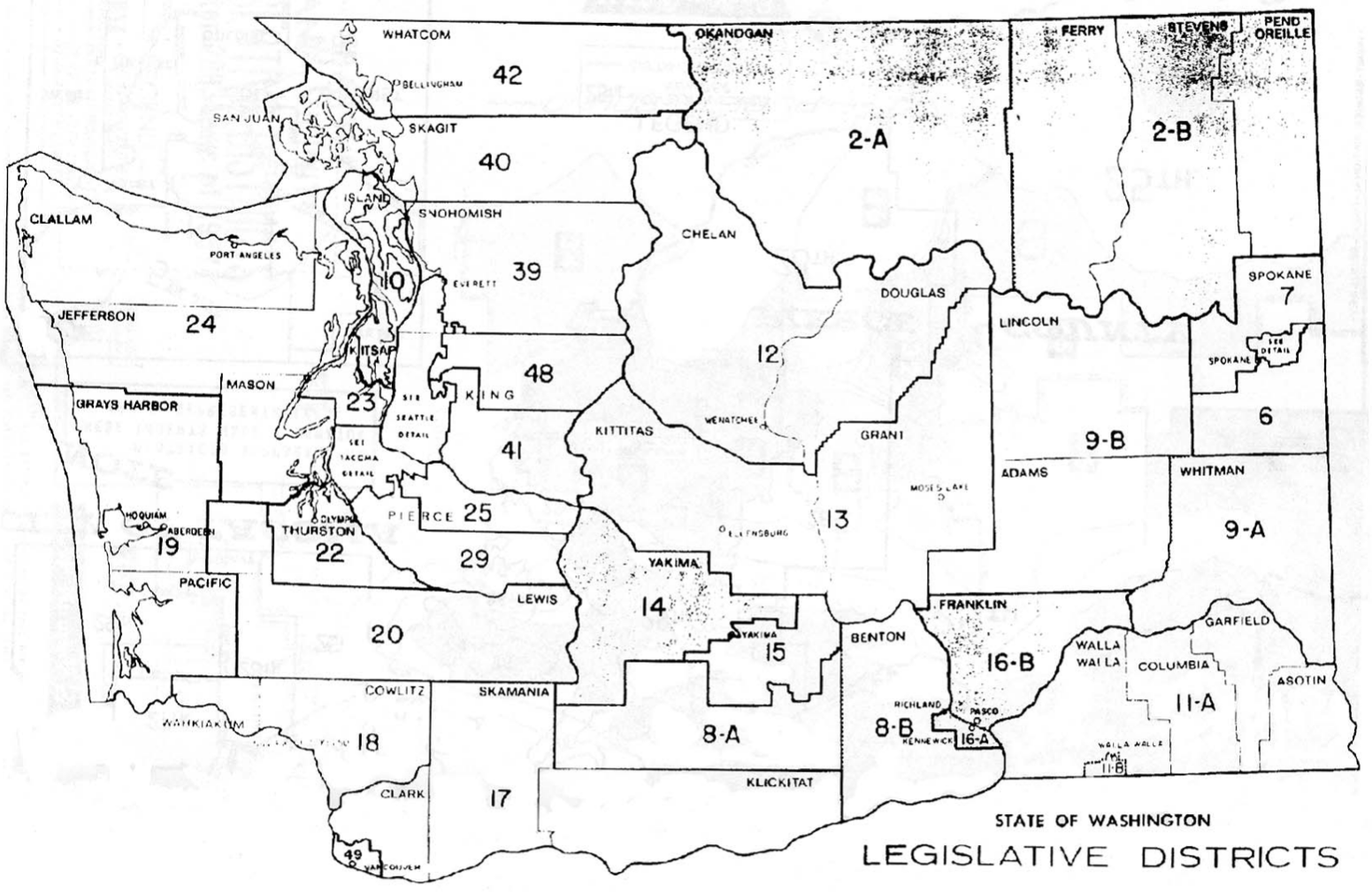
1965 Washington legislative district map

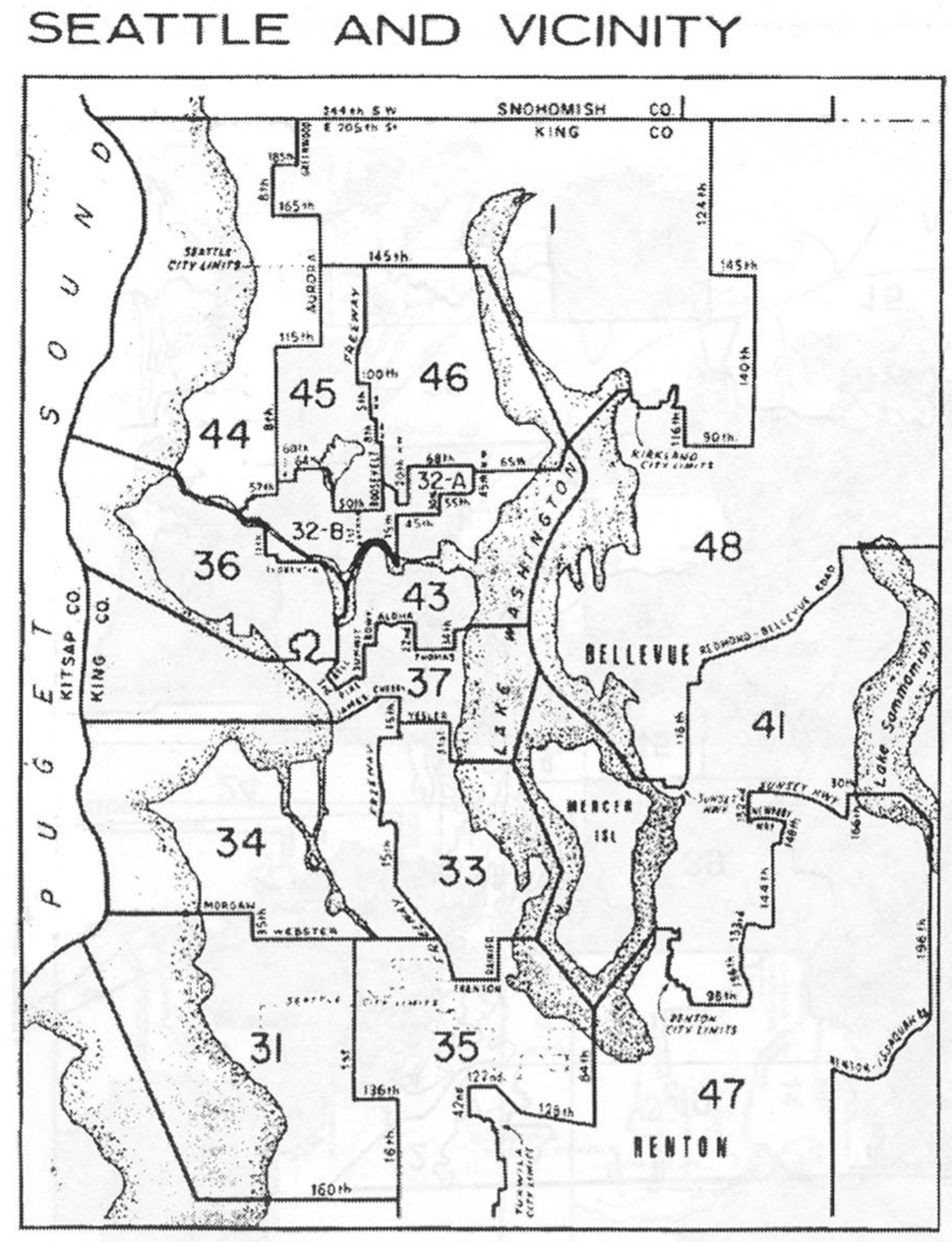
1965 Washington legislative district map for Seattle

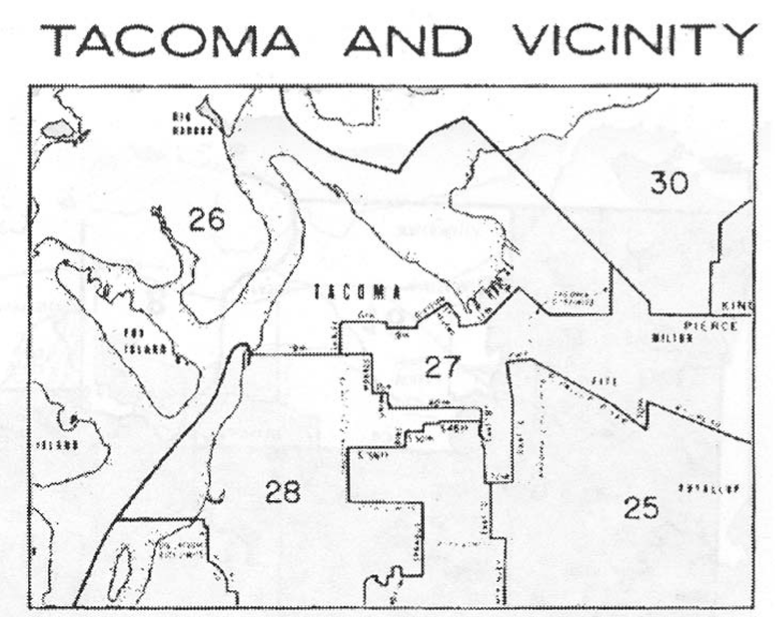
1965 Washington legislative district map for Tacoma

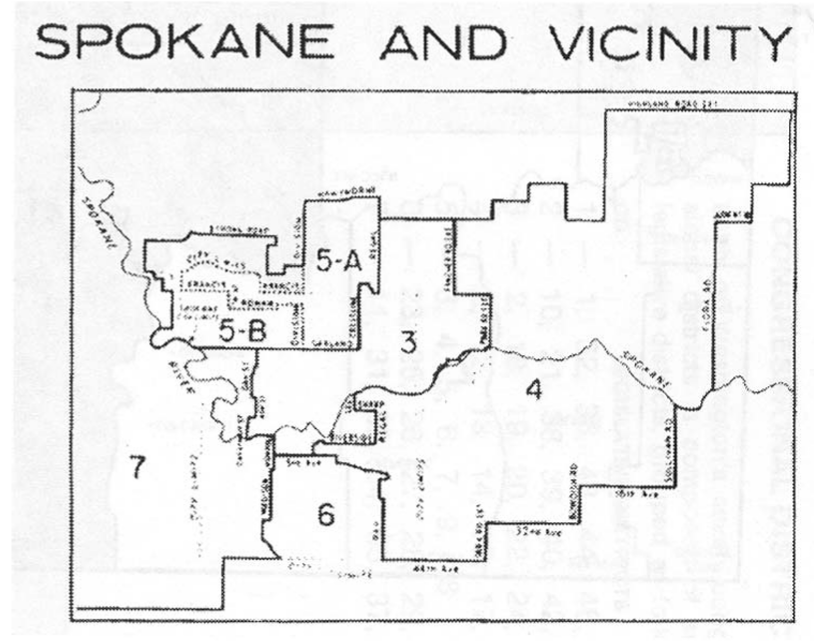
1965 Washington legislative district map for Spokane

Following the 1960 census, in the 1962 landmark case Baker v. Carr, the U.S. Supreme Court ruled that the Fourteenth Amendment's equal protection clause provided a basis for citizens to bring legal action for the malapportionment of electoral districts. In response to this ruling, the League of Women Voters put initiative 211 on the ballot in November 1962 which would have required all legislative districts be of equal population. Separately, in August 1962 James Thigpen filed a lawsuit against Washington Secretary of State Victor Aloysius Meyers to force the state to make their legislative districts equally sized. The initiative was opposed by those in less populous portions of the state on the basis that King County already contained 30% of the seats in both chambers of the legislature and it ultimately failed at the ballot box earning 47% of the vote.

After initiative 211 was defeated, in December 1962, District Court Judge William Beeks ruled Washington's legislative districts were unconstitutional in the court case Thigpen v. Meyers. His judgement in this case was stayed while the 9th Circuit and Supreme Court heard appeals. In the 1963 session of the legislature following this ruling, six Democrats in the House joined Republicans in ousting Speaker John L. O'Brien over his strategy for handling redistricting. After the ouster of Speaker O'Brien, the legislature failed to pass a redistricting plan during both their regular session and a 23 day special session called by Governor Rosellini.

While the appeals were being heard, in 1964, the US Supreme Court issued rulings in two other landmark redistricting cases under the Warren Court's "one person, one vote" principle. In Wesberry v. Sanders, the court ruled that congressional districts must be approximately equal in population. The court also ruled in the case Reynolds v. Sims that both chambers of state legislatures were required to have districts which were approximately equal in population. In line with their other 1964 rulings, on June 22, 1964, the Supreme Court rejected the state's appeals in Thigpen v. Meyers and upheld the lower court's ruling that Washington's legislative maps were unconstitutional.

Following the Supreme Court's ruling, the district court granted a temporary stay on the ruling in order to allow candidates for the state legislature to file in the existing districts for the 1964 election. Had a stay not been granted, all seats in the state legislature may have been elected in one statewide at-large district. The court ordered the Washington Legislature to enact a reapportionment plan that was constitutional under the "one person, one vote" principle before they could consider any other business in the 1965 legislative session. 47 days into the legislative session, the legislature passed a redistricting bill which created 49 single member senate districts and 56 representative districts which elected between one and three members. The district court accepted the plan while instructing the legislature that a new plan would need to be enacted following the 1970 census.

==== 1970s redistricting ====
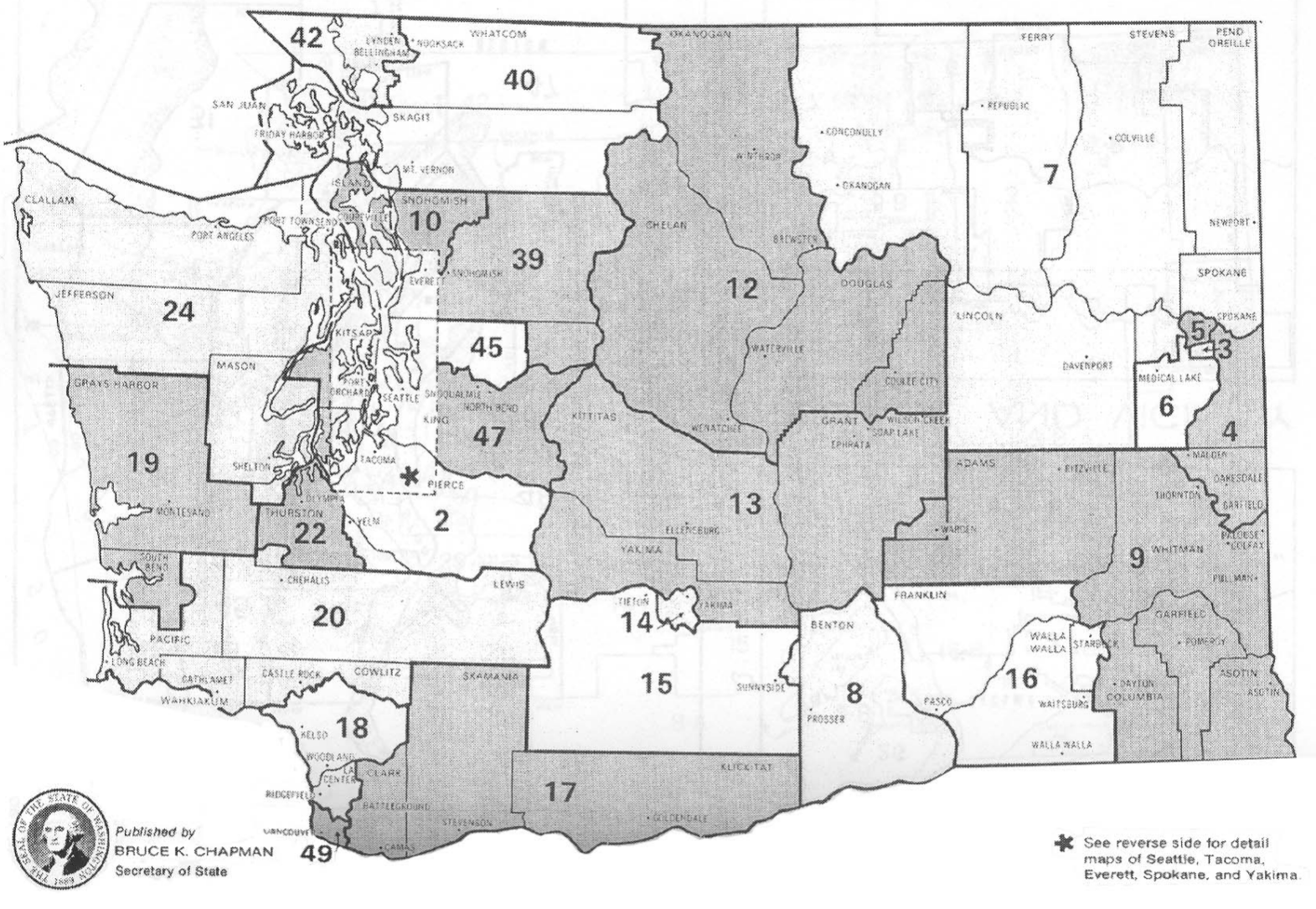
1972 Washington legislative district map

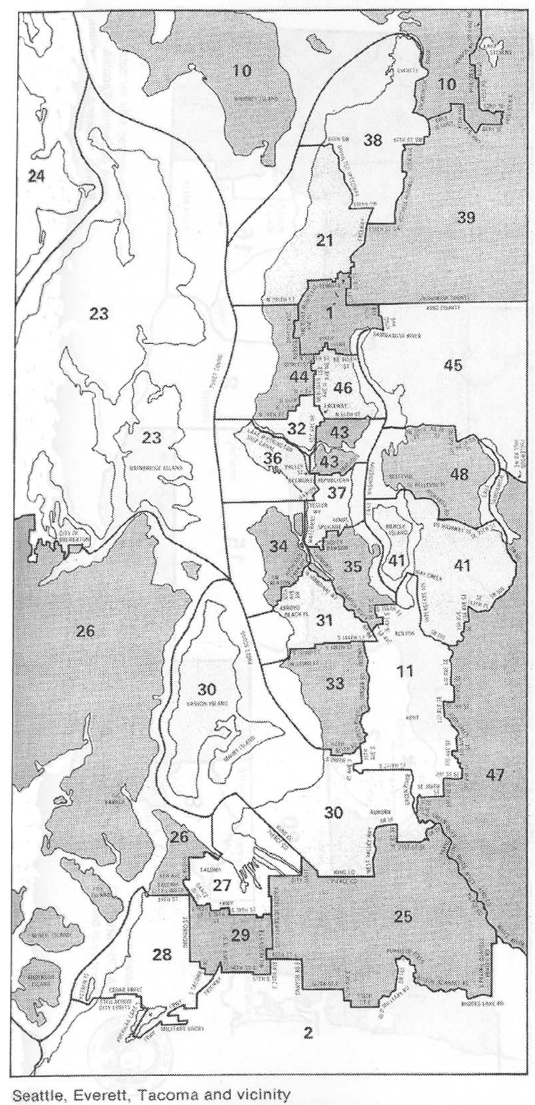
1972 and 1982 Washington legislative district map for the Puget Sound region

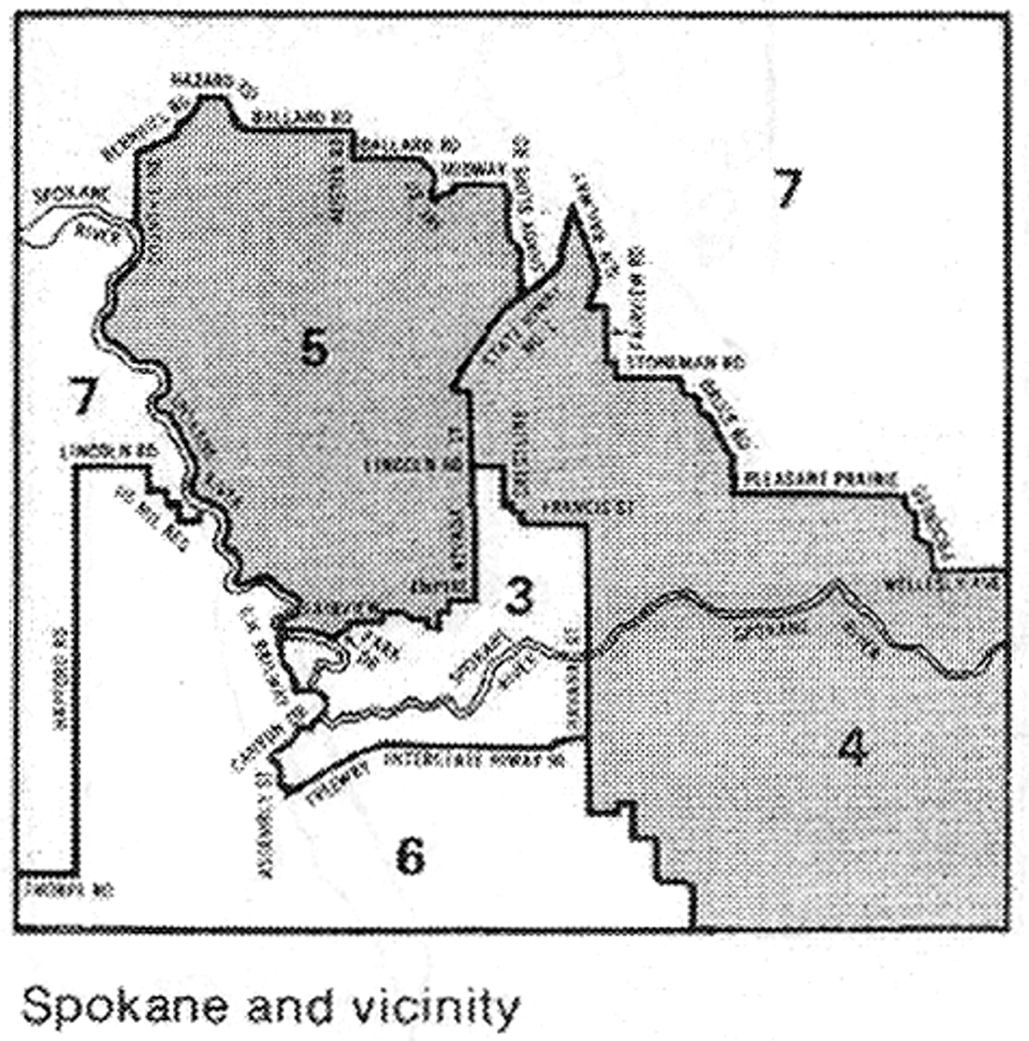
1972 and 1982 Washington legislative district map for Spokane

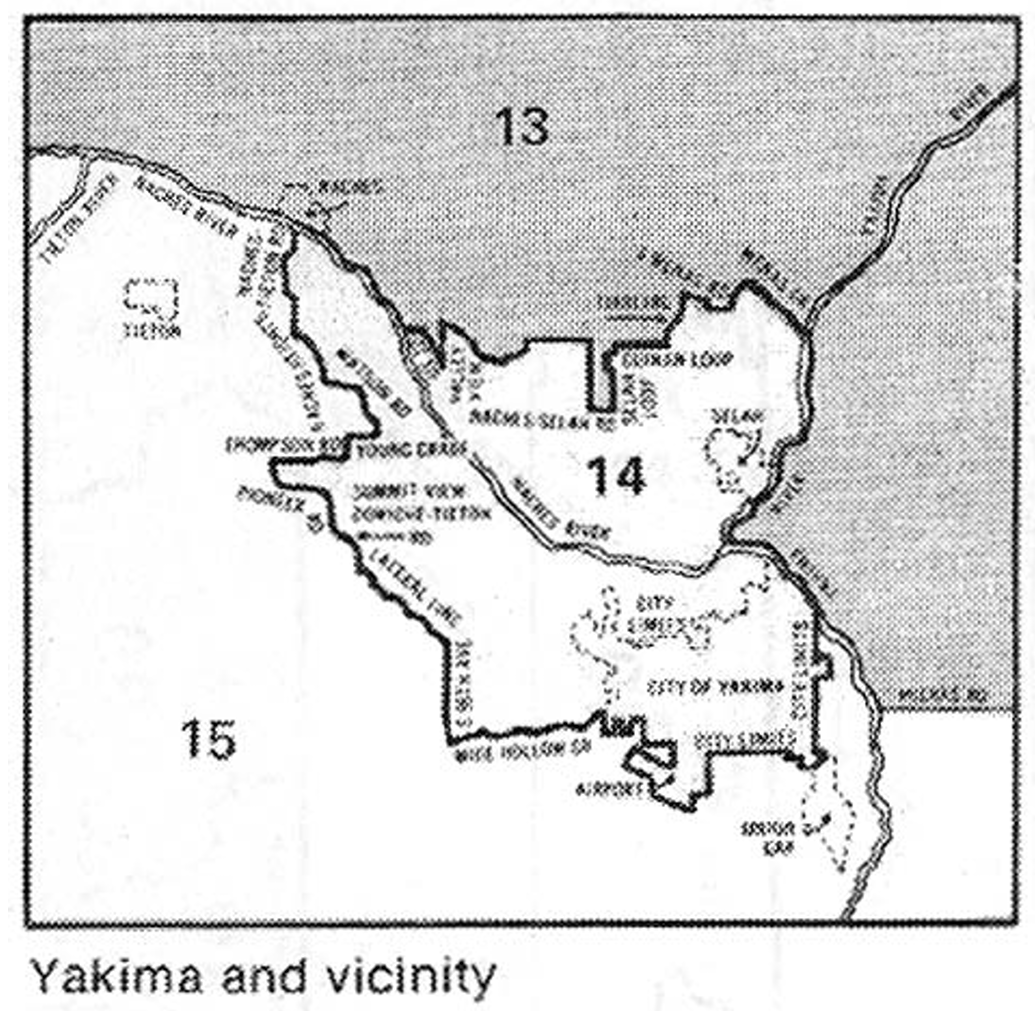
1972 and 1982 Washington legislative district map for Yakima

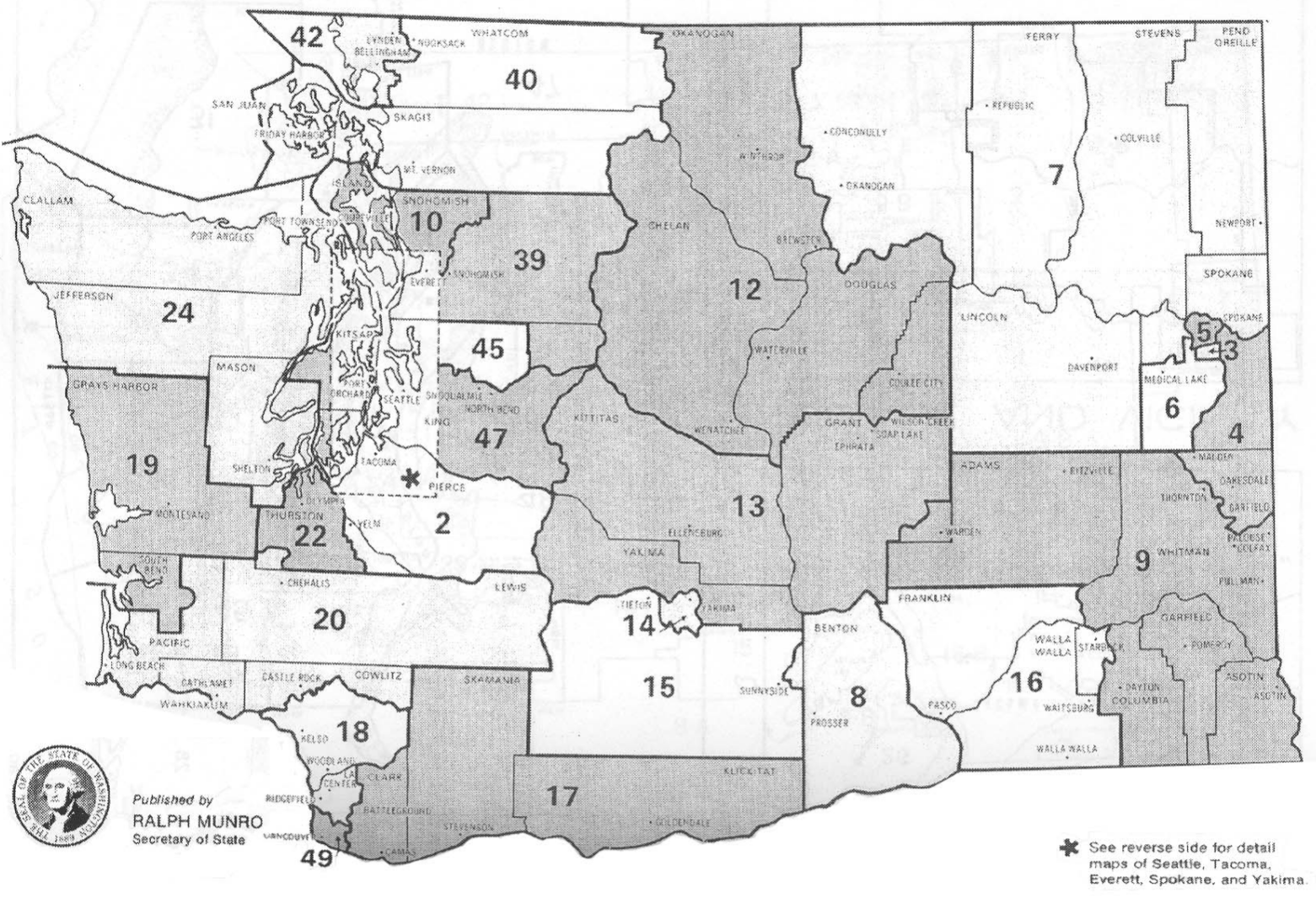
1982 Washington legislative district map

After the 1970 census and elections, Democrats controlled the Senate while Republicans controlled the House and the Governor's mansion. This led to a deadlock with the legislature failing to pass a redistricting plan during the 1971 legislative session. In response, the case Prince v. Kramer was filed by George Prince in the District Court for the Western District of Washington seeking to force the state to redistrict. The district court ruled the state's current legislative and congressional districts unconstitutional in 1971, and ordered the legislature to draw new maps by the end of their legislative session or the court would draw the maps. After the 1972 session passed without new maps, the court ordered new congressional and state legislative district maps drawn for the upcoming 1972 elections. The court-ordered map set the number of senators at 49 and representatives at 98 with two representatives being elected from each district which, other than a break following the 1980 redistricting, is how maps are drawn in Washington to this day.

==== 1980s redistricting and Establishment of the Redistricting Commission ====
The 1980 census apportioned an 8th congressional seat to Washington, the first new seat for the state since the 1950 census. After the 1980 elections, Republicans controlled both houses of the legislature and the governorship. The state legislature passed redistricting bills for both the state legislature and Washington's congressional districts. Governor John Spellman signed a revised state legislative redistricting plan into law which had the 19th and 39th senate districts broken up into an A and B district for their house map.

Despite the proposed congressional maps favoring his party, Governor Spellman vetoed them. The maps had received strong opposition from all members of the Washington State congressional delegation and were criticized for their Republican favored gerrymandering of Tom Foley's fifth district by splitting Spokane (the district's main population center) into two districts. The legislature passed a new congressional redistricting plan in February 1982 which was signed into law by Governor Spellman. The new districts included Everett in the Seattle dominated 1st District which led to Everett voters and officials filing a lawsuit over the plan to block the implementation of the maps. In their decision on the case, Doph v. Munro, a three judge panel for the 9th Circuit went beyond the plaintiff's request and invalidated the entire congressional redistricting plan passed by the legislature. This was the last case where a federal court invalidated Washington's legislative or congressional maps until the 2022 case Soto Palmer v. Hobbs.

Following the court order in Doph v. Munro, the legislature established a temporary citizen panel to redraw their congressional boundaries. The panel, made up of two Democrats, two Republicans, and one non-voting chair, completed their work in the 18 days allotted to them and transmitted their map to the legislature for approval. After the legislature approved the new congressional maps, they referred Senate Joint Resolution 103 to the voters which would amend Washington's Constitution to transfer the responsibility of redistricting congressional and state legislative maps from the Legislature to an independent commission with a similar composition to the temporary panel. It was approved by voters in the 1983 election earning 61% of the vote becoming Amendment 74 to the Washington Constitution. When it passed, it made Washington the third state in the US to set up an independent redistricting commission.

=== Washington Redistricting Commission Era ===
==== 1990s redistricting ====
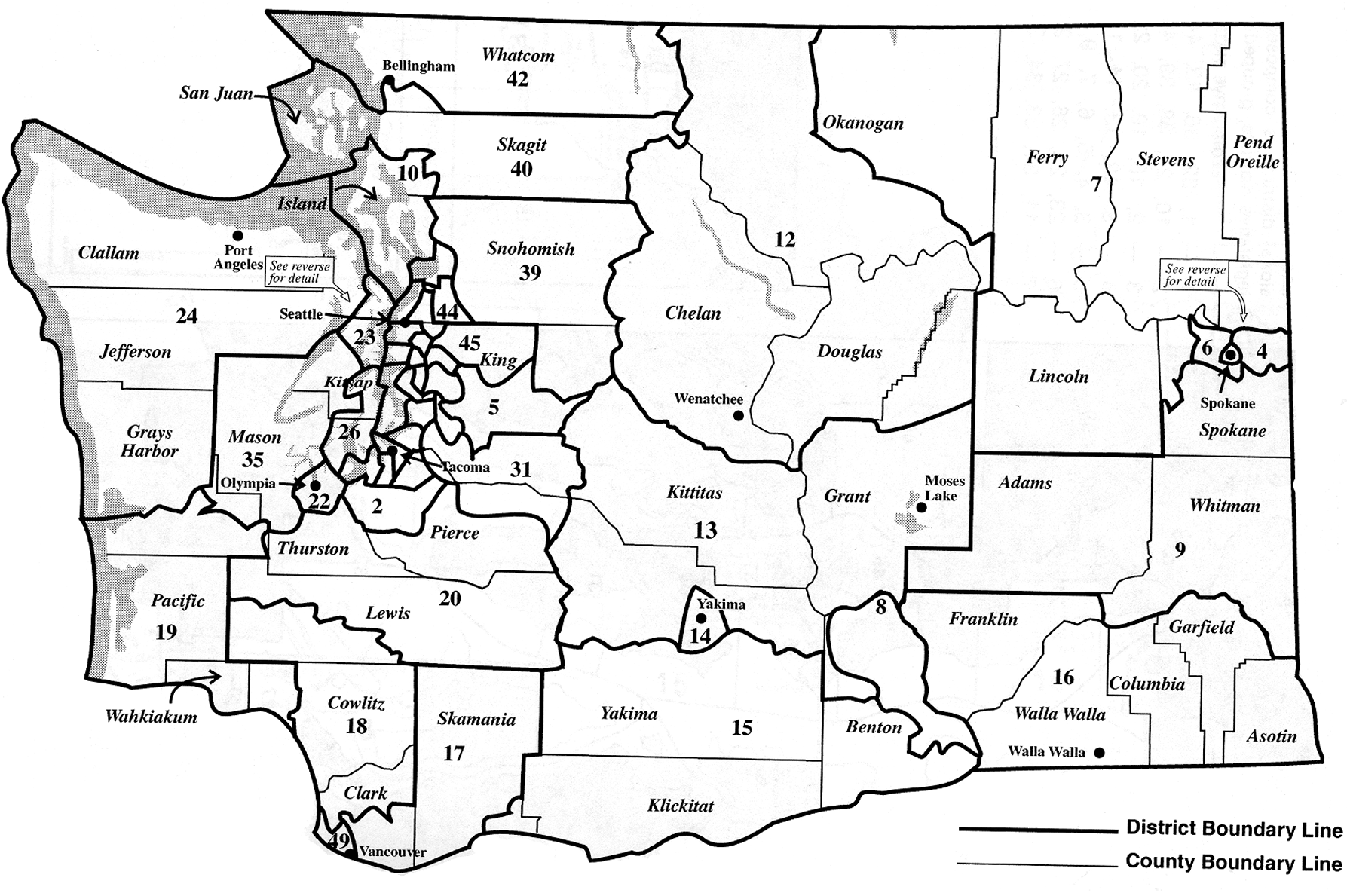
1992 Washington legislative district map

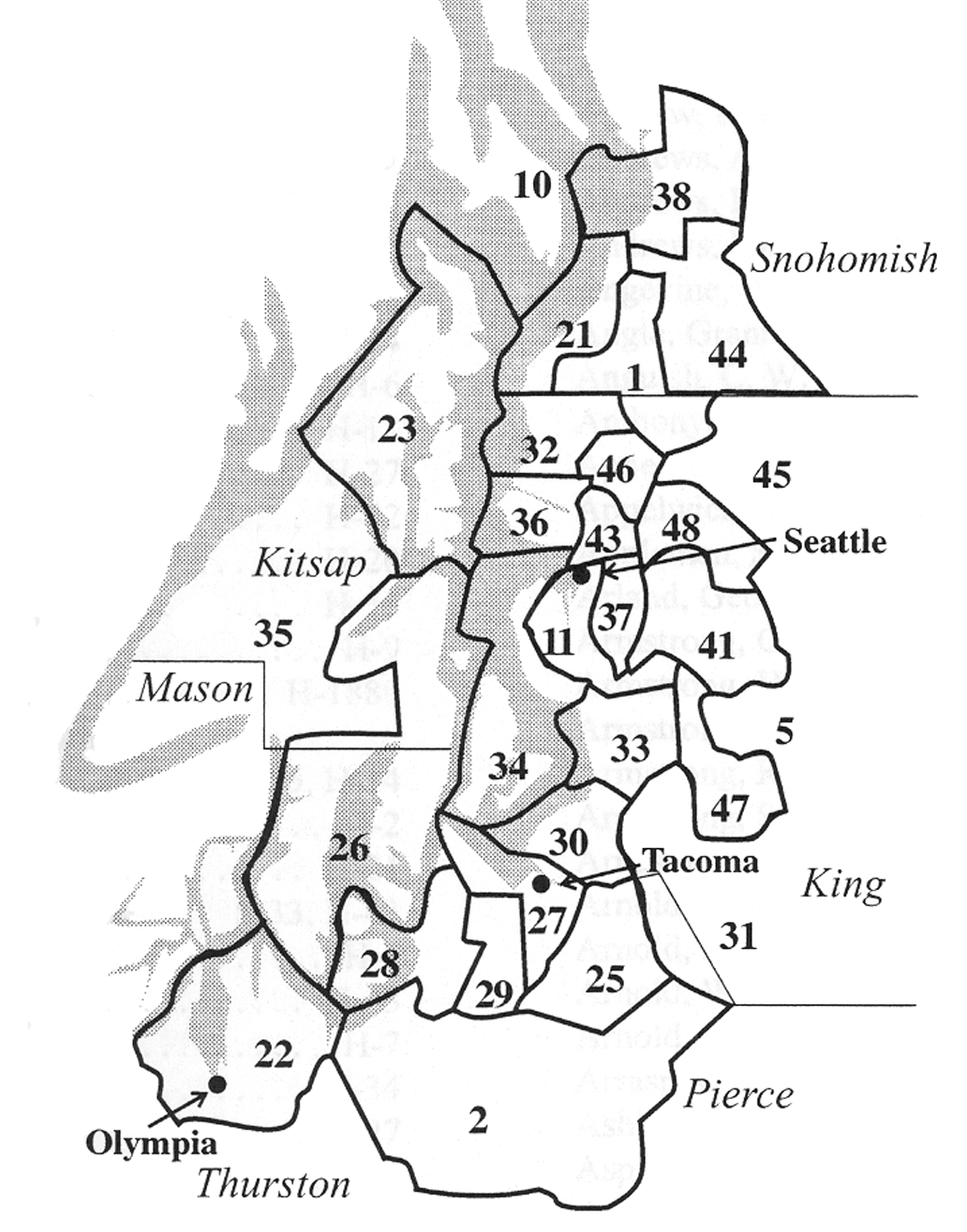
1992 Washington legislative district map for the Puget Sound region

This was the first redistricting cycle where the Washington State Redistricting Commission was charged with the task of redistricting both Washington's congressional and state legislative districts. With the 1990 census, Washington had gained its 9th Congressional District. The Redistricting Commission's plan was submitted on January 1, 1992, and went into effect on February 11 with only minor changes from the legislature. The plan created the new 9th District in South King County, parts of Tacoma, and a mix of rural and suburban communities in Pierce and Thurston Counties. The addition of the 9th District mostly shifted the other congressional districts in Western Washington with the Eastern Washington districts remaining largely unchanged.

In 1995, the legislature passed a law requiring the commission to transmit their redistricting plan to the legislature no later than December 15 of a year ending in one. However, the constitutional deadline remained on January 1 of a year ending in two.

==== 2000s redistricting ====
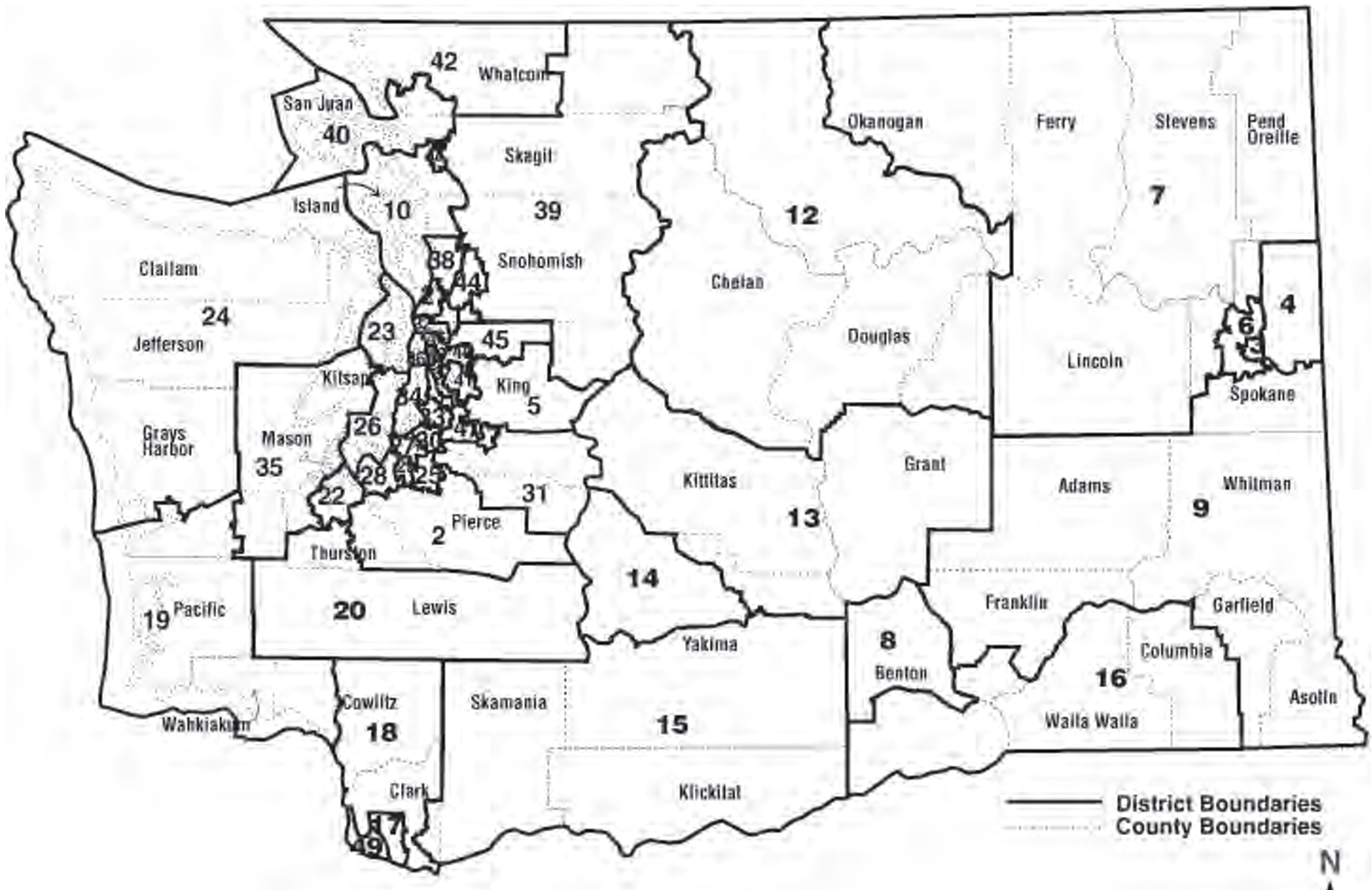
2002 Washington legislative district map

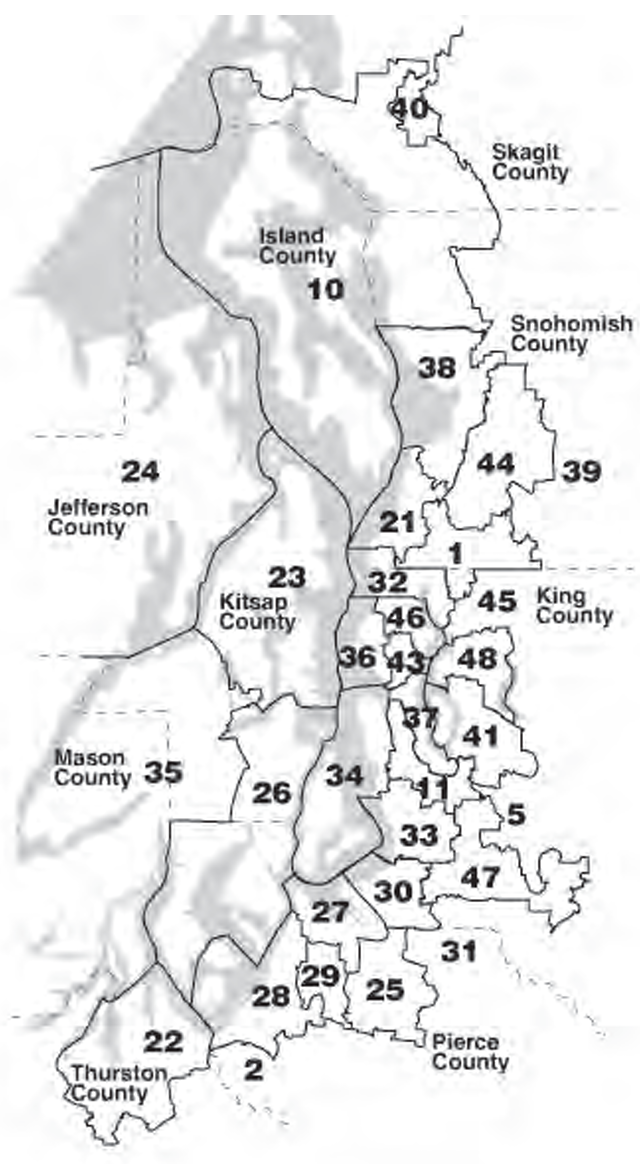
2002 Washington legislative district map for the Puget Sound region

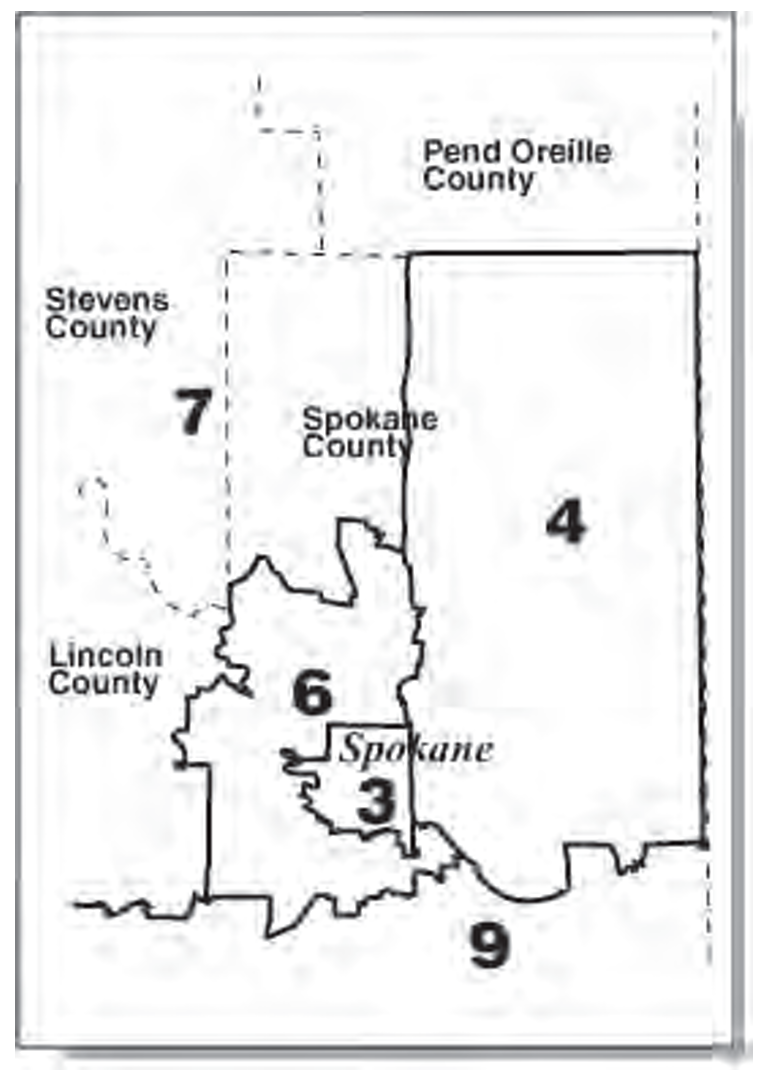
2002 Washington legislative district map for Spokane

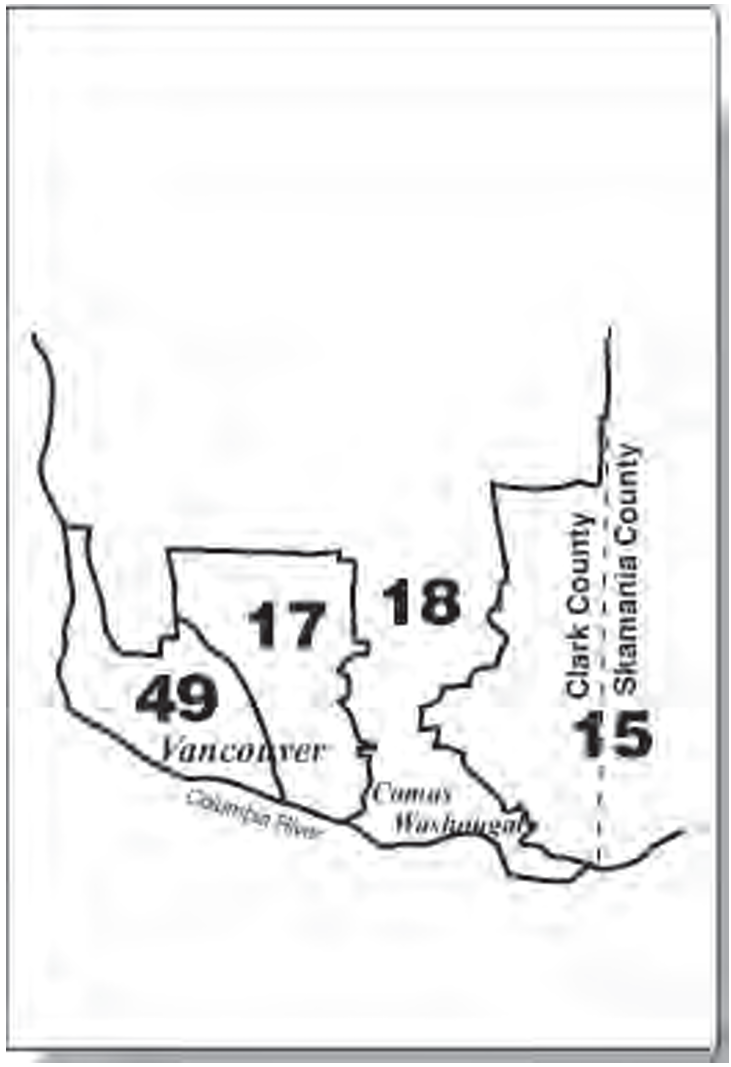
2002 Washington legislative district map for Vancouver

After the 2000 census, the second redistricting commission met and submitted a plan for the legislative districts to the legislature by the statutory deadline of December 15, 2001. However, due to disagreements, they did not transmit a congressional map to the legislature until the constitutional deadline of January 1, 2002. At the request of Attorney General Christine Gregoire, Governor Gary Locke signed a bill moving the statutory deadline back to January 1 of a year ending in two and both maps became law.

==== 2010s redistricting ====
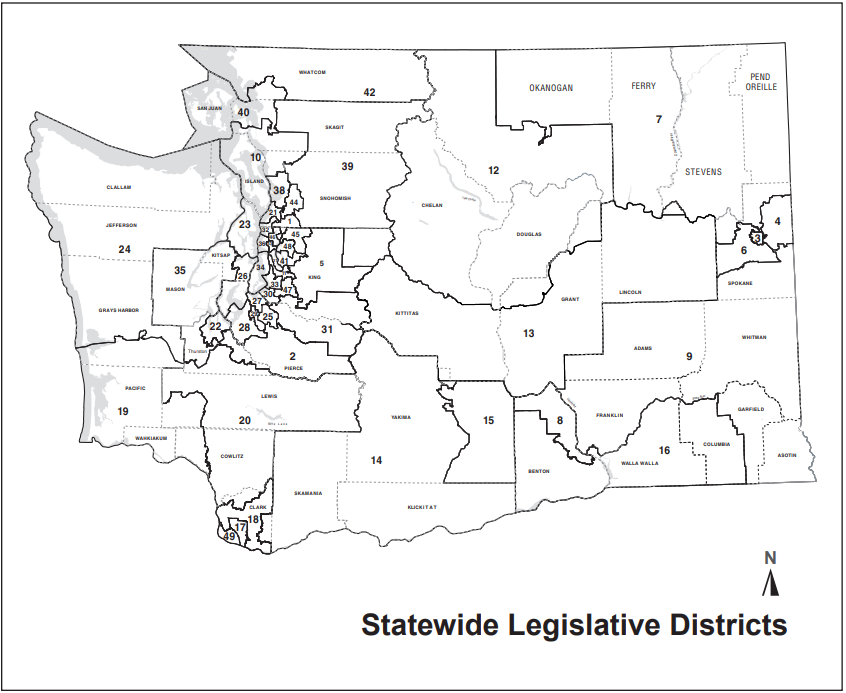
2012 Washington State legislative district map

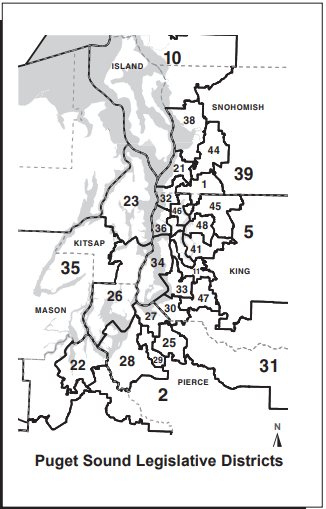
2012 Washington State legislative district map for the Puget Sound region

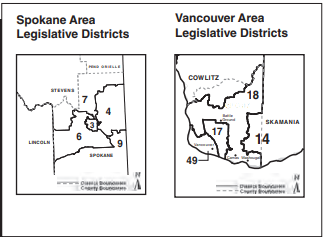
2012 Washington State legislative district map for Spokane and Vancouver

After the 2010 census, the third Redistricting Commission met and submitted redistricting plans to the state legislature for both Washington's congressional and legislative districts at the January 1 deadline. These plans included Washington's new 10th Congressional District. The maps were passed by the commission and became law with minor adjustments from the legislature. The plan drew Washington's new 10th District in suburban Pierce County, most of Thurston County, and parts of Mason County. This led to major changes for the rest of Washington's congressional map with 3rd and 8th districts picking up counties from the other side of the Cascades in Central Washington, the 6th district being drawn to include the entire Olympic and Kitsap Peninsulas, and the 1st District gaining large portions of rural King, Snohomish, Skagit, and Whatcom Counties stretching from the East Seattle suburbs to the Canadian border.

In between redistricting cycles, during the 2016 legislative session, the legislature unanimously passed Senate Joint Resolution 8210 which changed the constitutional deadline for the redistricting commission to transmit a proposed map to the legislature from January 1 of a year ending in two to November 15 of a year ending in one. It was approved by voters in November 2016 with 77% of the vote becoming Amendment 108 to the Washington Constitution.

Another change to the redistricting process came when Senate Bill 5287 was signed into law in 2019 becoming RCW 44.05.140. This law required the redistricting commission to count most inmates as residing in their last place of residence rather than wherever they are incarcerated for the purposes of reapportioning and redistricting. They passed a follow-up law in 2022 which required counties, cities, and other local governments to follow the same practice, though the law did not impact local government's redistricting for the 2020 census. These laws were part of an effort to correct the distortions that state prisons can have on the redistricting process, especially for smaller districts. In particular, these practices tended to grant the more rural, white districts where prisons are located more political power while taking it away from more the more ethnically diverse districts where people were residing before they were imprisoned.

==== 2020s redistricting ====
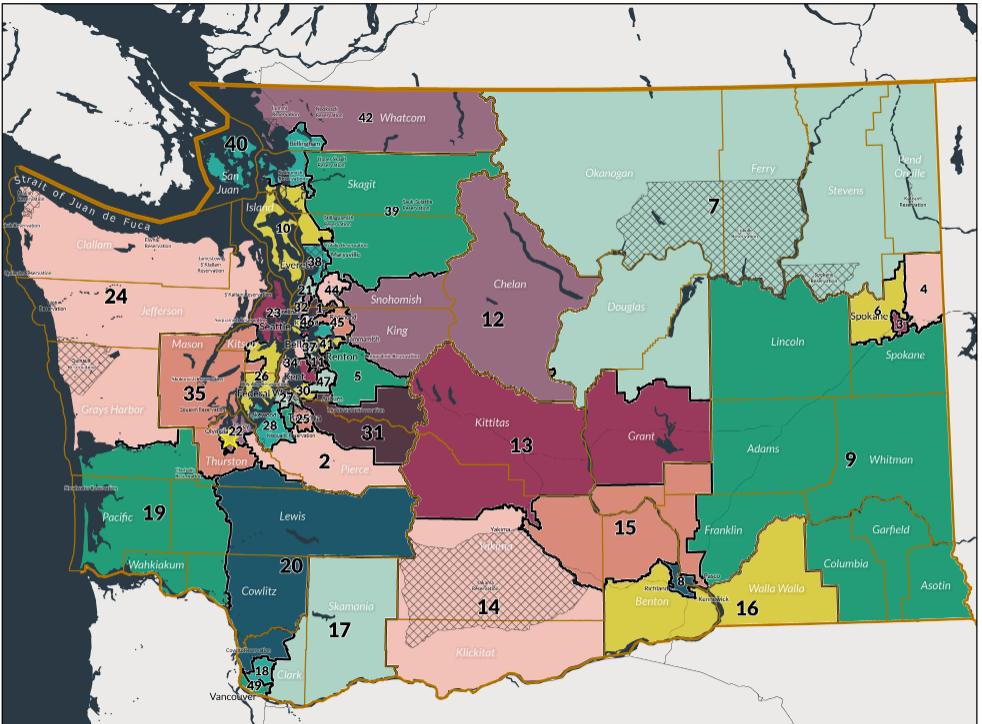
2022 Washington State legislative district map

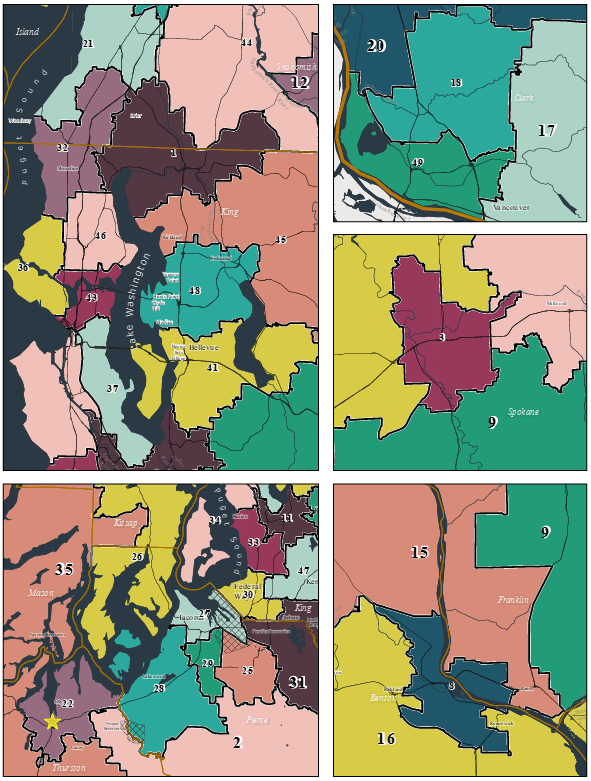
2022 Washington State legislative district map for the major metro areas of Washington

Due to the COVID-19 pandemic, the results from the 2020 census were released four and a half months late in mid-August 2021. The fourth Redistricting Commission was faced with a short timeline and several changes made to the redistricting process between 2010 and 2020. After the selection of the commission members, Democratic commissioners Brady Walkinshaw and April Sims called for Republican commissioner Joe Fain to resign and be replaced due to 2018 sexual assault allegations from a City of Seattle employee, but Fain did not resign.

Public record requests showed that commissioners Paul Graves and April Sims led negotiations on the state legislative maps while commissioners Joe Fain and Brady Walkinshaw led negotiations on the congressional maps. Records also showed that the significant growth of the Latino population in the Yakima Valley led to the strongest disagreements over the legislative maps. Republicans sought to maintain their political dominance in the region, while Democrats sided with Latino activists from the area who pushed to draw a Voting Rights Act (VRA) compliant opportunity district for Latinos in the region. Both Republicans and Democrats hired experts to provide merit to their positions. Republican experts argued that the VRA itself was unconstitutional under the 14th Amendment's equal protection clause. Democratic experts argued that the Yakima Valley needed at least one if not two legislative districts where at least a 60% of the voting-age population was Latino to comply with the VRA. In the end, the 15th District in the Yakima Valley that was passed by the commission had only 51.5% Latino voting-age population which was seen as a win for Republicans. This district was the basis for the lawsuit that would be filed by Susan Soto Palmer in 2022.

The commission failed to transmit a plan by midnight on November 15, but agreed to a set of maps on November 16, 2021.Under the Washington state constitution, if the commission fails to pass a redistricting plan by the deadline, then the Washington Supreme Court is required to take on the responsibility of redistricting. Despite missing their deadline, the Redistricting Commission encouraged the state Supreme Court to enact the maps they had agreed on. On December 3, the court ruled that the commission had "substantially complied with the statutory deadline" and ordered the commission to complete its work to transmit the consensus redistricting plans to the legislature. The legislature passed the plan with minor amendments and it went into effect on February 8, 2022.

After the plan was completed in November 2021, multiple lawsuits were filed alleging that the Redistricting Commission had violated Washington's public meetings law, particularly during their deliberations on the evening of November 15th through the morning of November 16th when they were finalizing the maps. In March 2022, the cases were settled with each of the commissioners paying a fine of $500, and with the commission covering $135,000 of legal costs for the plaintiffs and entering into a consent decree pledging reforms and trainings.

===== Soto Palmer v. Hobbs =====
On January 19, 2022, a group of Washington voters supported by the Campaign Legal Center and the Mexican American Legal Defense and Education Fund filed a lawsuit against Secretary of State Steve Hobbs in the District Court for the Western District of Washington. They alleged that the state legislative maps as drawn violated the Voting Rights Act of 1965 (VRA) and asked the court to order new maps that would provide an opportunity for the Hispanic and Latino communities in the Yakima Valley to elect a representative. A group of conservative Latino voters including State Rep. Alex Ybarra intervened in the case to defend the existing maps.

In August 2023, Judge Robert Lasnik ruled that Washington State legislative District 15 in the Yakima Valley portion of Central Washington as it was drawn by the Washington State Redistricting Commission in 2021 violated the VRA. In his ruling, he called for the state legislature to reconvene the Redistricting Commission to draw new maps that complied with the ruling, otherwise the court would take over the process of drawing new maps. While Republican lawmakers wanted to reconvene the Redistricting Commission to produce new maps, it would have required the legislature to call a special session. Both Governor Jay Inslee and Democrats in both chambers of the legislature were opposed to calling a special session and reconvening the commission believing that allowing the court to draw the maps would be the most expedient and non-political way for new maps to be drawn.

Since the state legislature declined to call a special session to reconvene the Redistricting Commission, Judge Lasnik ordered the plaintiffs to produce maps that would comply with his ruling and appointed a special master to assist the court in evaluating the maps. The plaintiffs submitted 5 different map proposals for the court to consider while the intervenor defenders submitted one as well. Experts hired by both the plaintiffs and defendants gave testimony detailing their analysis of the proposed maps. Republican experts arguing the maps were an unconstitutional racial gerrymander which favored Democrats. Democratic experts encouraged the court to adopt one of the proposed maps. The Yakima Nation also provided testimony asking the court to ensure the new district boundaries kept as much of their on and off reservation land in one district as possible. Once the court selected a preferred map from the 5, the court ordered the plaintiffs to work with the Secretary of State to address technical details and the concerns raised by the Yakima Nation.

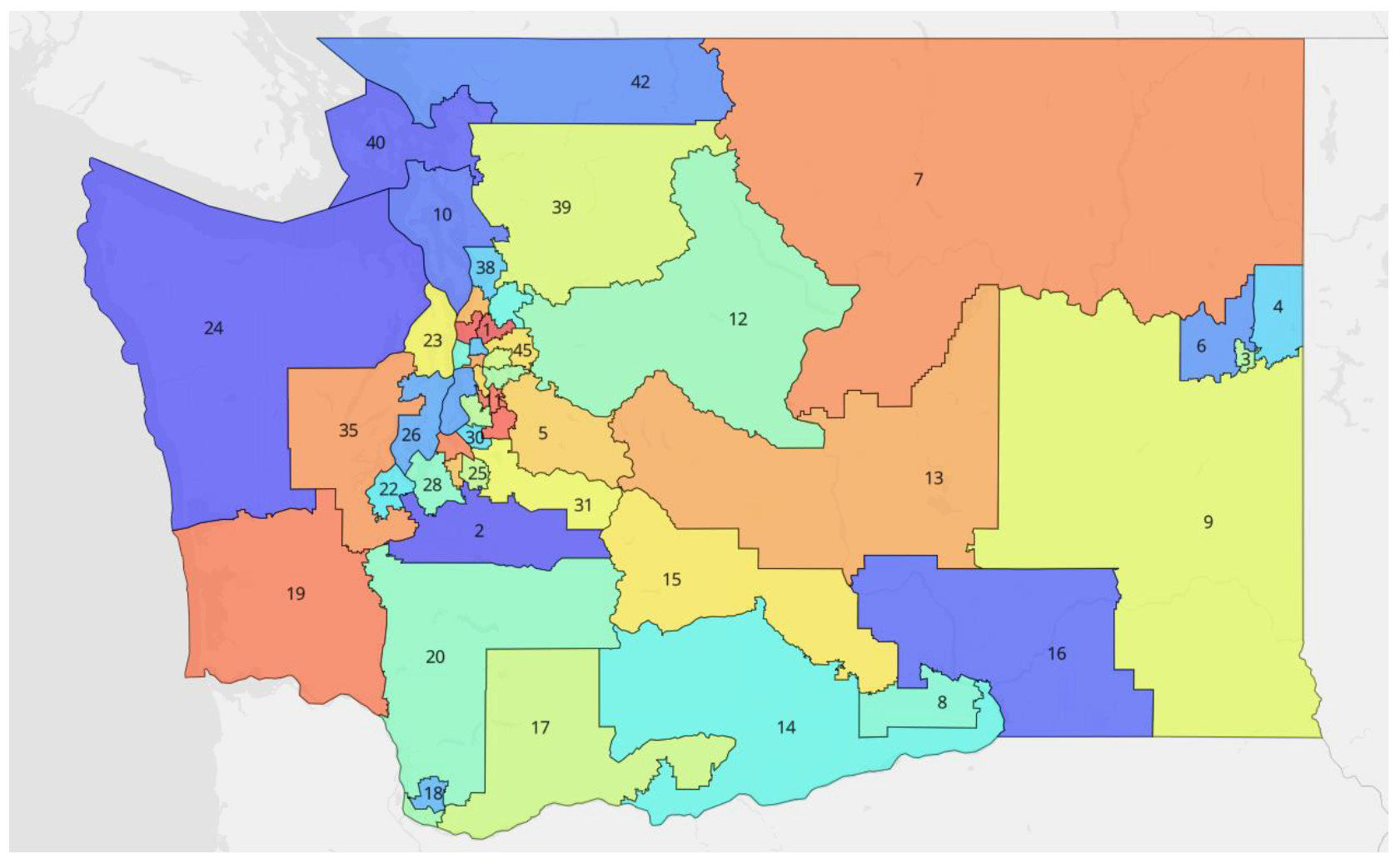
2024 Washington State legislative district map ordered implemented by Judge Robert Lasnik

On March 15, 2024, Judge Lasnik approved new legislative districts to be used in subsequent state legislative elections based on a modified version of one of the plaintiffs proposals. The court order redrew 13 districts, primarily in Central Washington. The legislative districts that had boundary changes due to this redistricting were District 2, District 5, District 7, District 8, District 9, District 12, District 13, District 14, District 15, District 16, District 17, District 20, and District 31 with largest changes being made to Districts 8, 13, 14, 15, and 16. In the court order, Judge Lasnik stated that the new map does not "meaningfully shift the partisan balance of the State" and "was not drawn (or adopted) purposely to favor one political party over the other."

The new maps were celebrated by Latino activists and the lawyers who brought the case as building on several other successful court cases they had brought to improve representation for Hispanic and Latino voters in the Yakima Valley. The maps were criticized by Nikki Torres, the Senator for the 15th District who was drawn out of her district, and other Republican lawmakers in Washington. Republicans claimed it was a partisan process that resulted in a map that favored Democrats. The intervenor defendants requested a stay from the 9th Circuit and subsequently the US Supreme Court pending their appeal. On March 22, the 9th Circuit denied their attempt to stay Judge Lasnik's decision and on April 3, 2024, the Supreme Court also denied their request for a stay ensuring the new maps would be used for elections in 2024. In August 2025, in an opinion written by Judge Margaret McKeown, a three judge panel for the 9th Circuit upheld both Judge Lasnik's ruling that the original maps violated the VRA and the new maps put in place by Judge Lasnik. The intervenor defendants have not filed an appeal with the US Supreme Court.

== Current Redistricting Procedure ==
The Washington State Redistricting Commission is appointed in January of years ending in one which is always the year following the US census. It is made up of a committee of four members, one each appointed by the majority and minority leaders of both houses of the legislature with some restrictions on who can be appointed. The four members of the committee then elect a non-voting chair who is typically not closely associated with either political party. In practice this has meant that the commission's voting body is made up of two Democrats and two Republicans so that maps cannot pass without bipartisan support.

The commission typically conducts outreach and public hearings and then deliberates on a plan. The outreach meetings and deliberations of the commission are subject to Washington's public meetings law. The commission has until November 15 of the year ending in one to agree on and transmit their proposed congressional and state legislative maps. The commission must reach 3 votes in support to pass a plan.

Once the plan is transmitted, the state legislature has 30 days from the start of their next legislative session to make adjustments which must be approved of by a two-thirds majority in both houses. The legislature may also reconvene the commission to modify their proposed plan by a two-thirds vote in both houses. Any modifications adopted by the commission after they reconvene must also be approved by a two-thirds vote in both houses. Once the plan is approved by the legislature, it is enacted.

If the commission does not approve a plan by November 15 of a year ending in one, the duty to redraw the districts is transferred to the Washington Supreme Court. They have until April 30 of a year ending in two to pass a plan. In addition, the Supreme Court has original jurisdiction over all cases involving the redistricting process.

=== Redistricting Standards ===
Districts must be as equal as practical in population to each other excluding nonresident military personnel. Under RCW 44.05.140, people incarcerated are generally counted in the district where they last lived. Districts should be as contiguous, compact, and convenient as possible and should be separated by natural geographic barriers, artificial barriers, or political subdivisions where possible. Districts cannot be drawn to favor or discriminate against any political party or group and must comply with the U.S. Constitution, the VRA, and all other applicable federal and state laws.

=== Number of Districts ===
The number of congressional districts apportioned to Washington by the federal government is 10. The Washington legislature has set the number of legislative districts at 49 with each district electing one senator and two representatives.

== Members ==
=== 1991 Commission ===
- Mary Kay Becker (Democratic appointee)
- Shelly Yapp (Democratic appointee)
- Bill Polk (Republican appointee)
- Veda Jellen (Republican appointee)
- Graham Fernald (non-voting chair)

=== 2001 Commission ===
- Dean Foster (Senate Democratic appointee)
- John Giese
- Bobbi Krebs-McMullen
- Richard Derham
- Graham Johnson (non-voting chair)

=== 2011 Commission ===
- Tim Ceis (Senate Democratic appointee)
- Slade Gorton (Senate Republican appointee)
- Dean Foster (House Democratic appointee)
- Tom Huff (House Republican appointee)
- Lura Powell (non-voting chair)

=== 2021 Commission ===
- Brady Walkinshaw (Senate Democratic appointee)
- Joe Fain (Senate Republican appointee)
- April Sims (House Democratic appointee)
- Paul Graves (House Republican appointee)
- Sarah Augustine (former non-voting chair, resigned on March 7, 2022)

== See also ==
- Washington's congressional delegations
- Washington's congressional districts
- Washington's at-large congressional district
- Washington legislative districts
- Elections in Washington (state)
