= Mark Mullet =

American politician and business owner

Member of the Washington Senate from the 5th district
- In office November 30, 2012 – January 13, 2025
- Preceded by: Dino Rossi
- Succeeded by: Bill Ramos

Personal details
- Born: Mark Douglas Mullet; August 14, 1972 (age 53) Seattle, Washington, U.S.
- Party: Democratic
- Spouse: Kelley Stryer
- Education: Indiana University (BS); University of Washington (MPA)
- Website: State Senate website

Mark Douglas Mullet (born August 14, 1972) is an American businessman, politician of the Democratic Party and mayor of Issaquah. A moderate, he was a member of the Washington State Senate, representing the 5th Legislative District from 2012 to 2025. In November 2025, he won the race for mayor of Issaquah in the general election.

Mullet, after more than 12 years in international finance at Bank of America, became a small business owner who owns Zeek's Pizza and Ben and Jerry's Ice Cream franchises in Issaquah.

== Early life ==
His father was Steve Mullet, a former Mayor of Tukwila, Washington from 2000 to 2007.

Mullet is a graduate of Foster High School. He earned a B.S. in Finance from Indiana University, and a Master's in Public Affairs from the Evans School at the University of Washington in 2008. Mullet was the Washington High School State Tennis Champion in 1989 and 1990.

== Career ==
Mullet is a small business owner, owning Zeek's Pizza and Ben and Jerry's Ice Cream franchises in the Issaquah and Sammamish area. Mullet had previously served as a managing director at Bank of America, serving as the Global Head of Foreign Currency Options Trading.

Before being elected to the state senate, Mullet served as a member of the Issaquah City Council, from 2009 to 2012. Mullet names Grand Ridge Plaza, a mixed-use retail center, and a plastic bag ban as his key accomplishments while on city council.

=== Elections ===
In 2012, Mullet was elected state senator representing Washington's 5th Legislative District by a 54.31% to 45.38% majority over his opponent Brad Toft.

=== Committee assignments ===
As of January 2019, Mullet is the Chair of the Financial Institutions, Economic Development and Trade Committee as well as a member of the Early Learning & K-12 Education Committee and Ways and Means Committee.

=== Legislation ===
Mullet sponsored and passed legislation increasing access to epi pens in schools, allowing annexation of the Maple Valley Donut Hole, and increasing health care cost transparency.

Mullet helped secure capital funding for projects throughout the 5th Legislative District, including: Lake Sammamish State Park improvements, road improvements on I-90 and the Pickering Place Retail Center, improvements at Camp Korey, a grant for the Railway History Museum in Snoqualmie, repairs at the Fire Training Academy in North Bend, and funding to help build a new Tahoma High School within Maple Valley.

=== Issaquah mayor ===
Mullet announced his candidacy for Issaquah mayor in December 2024. In November 2025, He won the race for mayor in the general election.

== 2024 gubernatorial election ==
On June 1, 2023, Mullet announced that he was running for governor.

In May 2024, Mullet filed an ethics complaint against Attorney General Bob Ferguson claiming that Ferguson used his office to influence a decision on candidate ballot ordering in the State Secretary's office to remove two other candidates named Bob Ferguson.

In the August 2024 primary, Mullet finished fourth, garnering roughly 6% of the vote. He finished behind Ferguson (45%), former King County Sheriff Dave Reichert (27%), and former school board member Semi Bird (11%).

== Awards ==
- 2021 City Champion Awards. Presented by Association of Washington Cities (AWC).
