= Victoria Hunt =

American politician

Member of the Washington State Senate from the 5th district
- Incumbent
- Assumed office June 3, 2025
- Preceded by: Bill Ramos

Member of the Washington House of Representatives from the 5th district
- In office January 13, 2025 – June 3, 2025 Serving with Lisa Callan
- Preceded by: Bill Ramos
- Succeeded by: Zach Hall

Personal details
- Born: Victoria Hunt
- Party: Democratic
- Education: Cornell University (BS, 2007); University of Illinois Chicago (PhD, 2015) in Computational Ecology
- Occupation: Data scientist, urban planner, local politician

Victoria Hunt is an American politician who is a member of the Washington State Senate from the 5th district since 2025. Previously elected to the Washington House of Representatives and a member of the Democratic Party, she won election to the senate to succeed the late Bill Ramos.

== Early life and education ==
Hunt earned a Bachelor of Science degree from Cornell University in 2007 and a Ph.D. in Computational Ecology from the University of Illinois Chicago in 2015.

== Career ==
Hunt has worked as the Chief Data Officer at Crosswalk Labs and as a faculty member at the University of Washington's Urban Design and Planning Department. She worked as a data scientist at Breakthrough Energy, Bill Gates's climate research firm, where she focused on electricity grid issues and modeling of the U.S. electric grid.

Hunt has served three terms as a member of the Issaquah City Council, where she advocated for increased density and affordable housing. She previously served on Issaquah's Planning Policy Commission. During her tenure as City Council President in 2020 and 2021, she helped establish a partnership with a local motel to provide temporary housing for people experiencing homelessness, which has helped approximately 40 individuals transition to permanent housing.

== Washington House of Representatives ==
=== 2024 election ===
Hunt won election to the Washington House of Representatives in 2024, succeeding Democrat Bill Ramos who ran for the Washington State Senate. In the August 6 primary election, Hunt received 35.1% of the vote in a field of five candidates. She went on to win the general election on November 5, defeating Republican Mark Hargrove with 54% of the vote to 46%.

=== Political positions ===
==== Environment and climate ====
Hunt supports environmental legislation and opposes efforts to repeal Washington's Climate Commitment Act, which established cap-and-trade in the state. She advocates for policies to reduce carbon pollution while ensuring grid reliability during decarbonization efforts. Drawing from her scientific background and experience at Breakthrough Energy, she emphasizes the importance of building out infrastructure to support the transition to cleaner energy sources. She has also supported legislation to require fossil fuel companies to disclose their financial records regarding consumer costs and profits.

Hunt has also advocated for increased emergency preparedness for natural disasters, especially in the aftermath of the 2024 Pacific bomb cyclone in Washington that affected the region.

==== Housing and homelessness ====
Hunt supports increased density and affordable housing initiatives while maintaining local control over zoning and regulatory policy. She has expressed support for the state's Missing Middle Housing bill, rent stabilization measures, and advocates for expanding the state's Housing Trust Fund. She has argued that zoning changes alone are insufficient to address affordable housing needs and supports larger investments in the Housing Trust Fund to subsidize affordable units. She has also shown interest in exploring housing land trusts as a potential solution to housing challenges.

==== Public safety ====
As a city councilmember, Hunt supported the implementation of co-response programs that pair behavioral health experts with law enforcement. She advocates for expanding state support for behavioral health services and crisis response programs across Washington. She has voiced opposition to placing school resource officers in schools.

==== Education ====
Hunt, a mother of two children in the public school system, supports increased funding for special education and universal free school lunches. She opposes voucher programs and charter school funding, advocating for maintaining focus on funding the traditional public school system.

==== Revenue policy ====
Hunt has expressed support for various progressive revenue proposals, including modifications to the capital gains tax, an excess compensation tax, and adjustments to make the estate tax more progressive. Victoria Hunt voted for SB-5801 which raised the Gas Tax.

==== Healthcare ====
Hunt supports the Keep Our Care Act, which aims to maintain healthcare services during hospital mergers. She has emphasized the importance of protecting reproductive rights and ensuring access to healthcare services across the state.

== Washington Senate ==
On June 3, 2025, Hunt was appointed by the King County Council to fill the vacancy left by Bill Ramos's death. She ran successfully in the November 2025 general election for a full term. Her term ends on January 8, 2029.

== Personal life ==
Hunt is married with two children who attend public school in Issaquah.
