= Bill Ramos =

American politician (1956–2025)

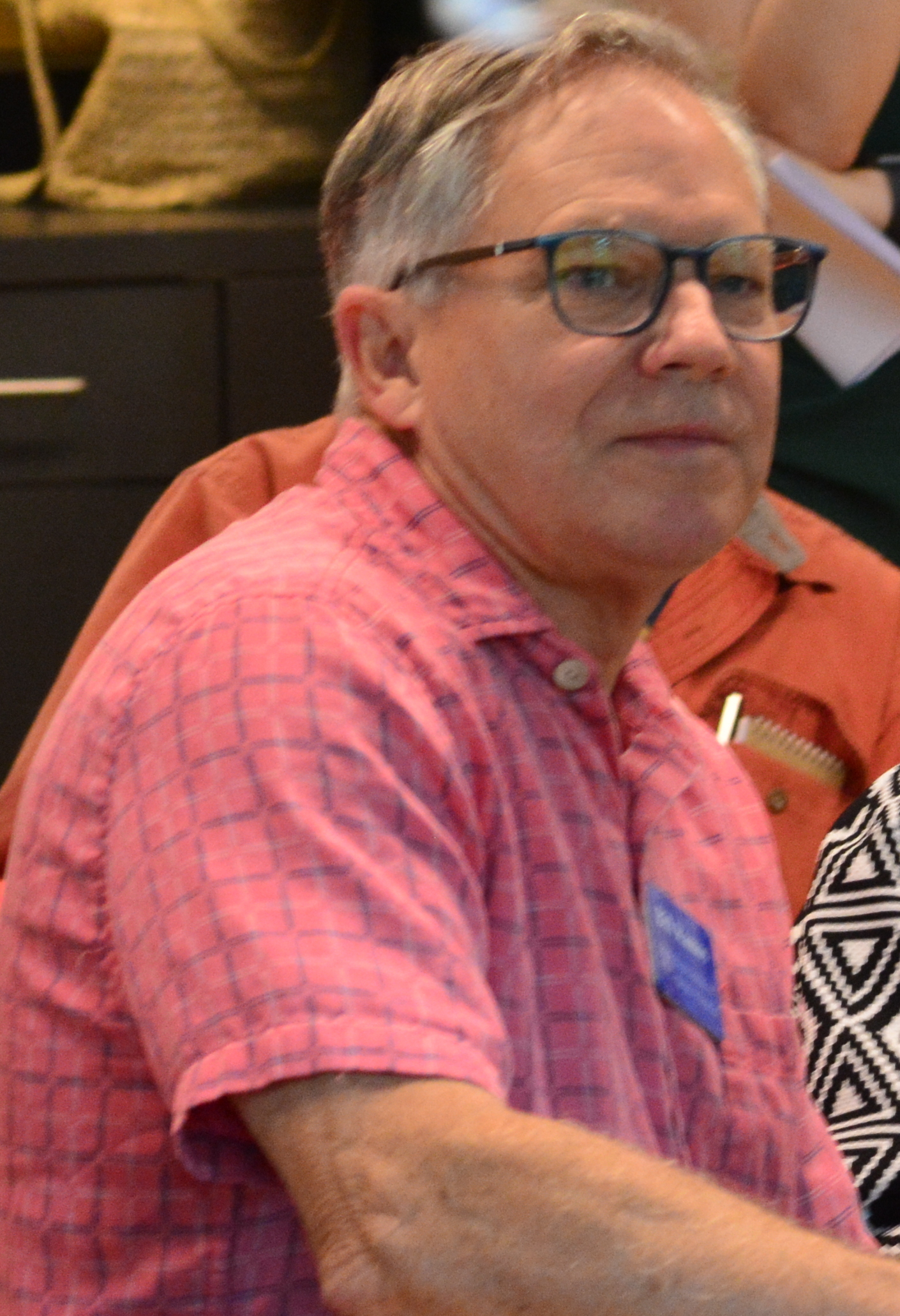
- Ramos in 2023

Member of the Washington Senate from the 5th district
- In office January 13, 2025 – April 19, 2025
- Preceded by: Mark Mullet
- Succeeded by: Victoria Hunt

Member of the Washington House of Representatives from the 5th district
- In office January 14, 2019 – January 13, 2025
- Preceded by: Jay Rodne
- Succeeded by: Victoria Hunt

Personal details
- Born: William George Ramos III; April 6, 1956 Oakland, California, U.S.
- Died: April 19, 2025 (aged 69) Issaquah, Washington, U.S.
- Party: Democratic
- Spouse: Sarah Perry
- Education: California State Polytechnic University, Humboldt (BS)
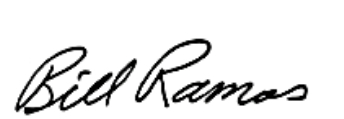
- Signature
- Website: voteramos.org

William George Ramos III (April 6, 1956 – April 19, 2025) was an American politician who served as a Democratic member of the Washington State Senate representing the 5th district from January 2025 until his death in April 2025. He served in the Washington State House of Representatives representing the 5th district from 2019 to 2025. Ramos was a member of the Issaquah city council from 2016 to 2018.

== Career ==
Ramos was born in the East Oakland region of Oakland, California, to salon owner Lupe Arizu and Bill Ramos in a Mexican and Spanish family.

Prior to serving in the Washington State House of Representatives, Ramos was a member of the Issaquah City Council from 2016 to 2018.

Ramos won election to the State House on November 6, 2018 from the platform of the Democratic Party. He secured fifty-two percent of the vote while his closest rival Republican Chad Magendanz secured forty-eight percent.

Ramos won re-election to the State House on November 3, 2020.

After Mark Mullet's announcement that he was running for governor, Ramos announced that he would seek Mullet's Senate seat. He won election to the State Senate in November 2024, defeating Republican Chad Magendanz with 51.9% of the vote.

== Personal life and death ==
Ramos was married to Sarah Perry, herself a politician and county councilmember in King County, Washington.

Ramos died on April 19, 2025, at the age of 69, while out running on a trail near his home in Issaquah, Washington.
