= 2017 Washington's 45th state senate district special election =

2017 Washington State Senate 45th District special election
- November 7, 2017

Washington's 45th state senate district
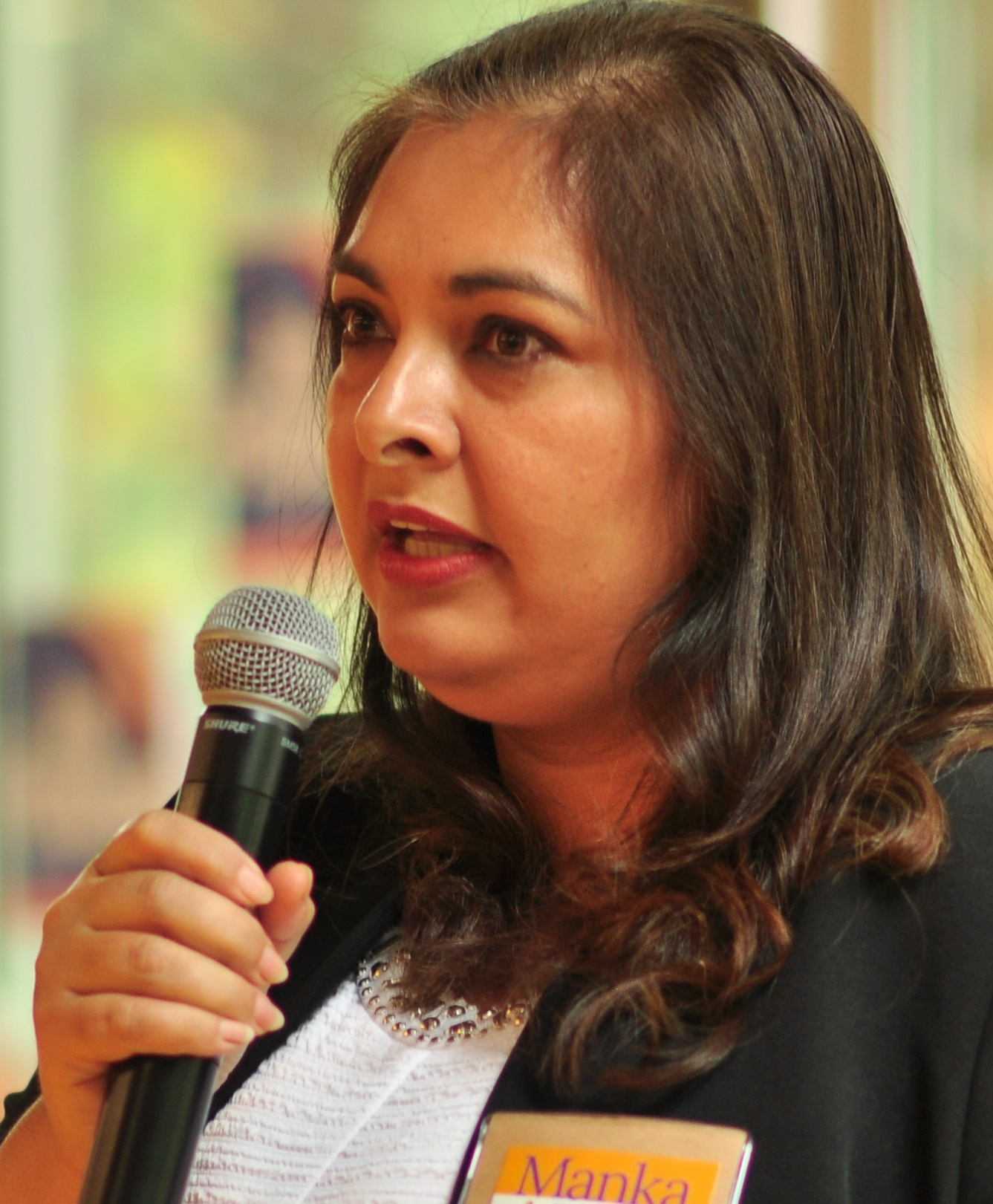

Candidate	Manka Dhingra	Jinyoung Lee Englund
Party	Democratic	Republican
Popular vote	27,755	22,361
Percentage	55.2%	44.5%
Senator before election
Dino Rossi
Republican
Senator
Manka Dhingra
Democratic

A special election was held on November 7, 2017, to fill the vacant seat in the Washington State Senate representing the 45th district. The seat was left vacant after the death of incumbent Andy Hill in October 2016. Dino Rossi, a former candidate for U.S. Senate in 2010 and for governor in 2004 and 2008, was appointed to fill the seat until the election. He announced that he would not run for the seat. The election was then contested between Manka Dhingra of the Democratic Party and Jinyoung Lee Englund of the Republican Party, who advanced as the top two finishers in the August primary. Dhingra won the election by more than ten percent, giving the Democratic caucus a 25–24 majority for the 2018 session.

Hill, a Republican, held the district from 2011 to 2016, helping give the Republican Party a one-seat majority coalition in the state senate with a Democrat. The election attracted interest from national Democratic and Republican donors, contributing more than $9 million in the state's costliest ever state legislative race.

== Background ==
The 45th legislative district comprised the northeastern suburbs of Seattle in King County, including the cities of Duvall and Woodinville and parts of Kirkland, Redmond, and Sammamish. In 2017, the district's residents had a median household income of $110,881, twice the state median, and were more likely to hold bachelor's degrees; the region included employees of the area's high tech industry alongside traditional industries such as horse farms and wineries. The 45th district's population was 74 percent white, 15 percent Asian, and 6 percent Hispanic of any race. In the 2016 presidential election, Hillary Clinton carried the district with 64.8 percent of votes.

The Eastside region was historically a Republican stronghold, but Democratic candidates began winning seats in the early 2000s. The 45th district elected former Microsoft executive Eric Oemig to the state senate in 2006, during a close election with the district's Republican representative Toby Nixon. Oemig lost re-election in 2010 to Republican Andy Hill, also a former Microsoft executive, during a campaign partially funded by the Koch-directed national Americans for Prosperity organization. Hill was re-elected in 2014 during a high-profile contest against Amazon.com product manager Matt Isenhower that attracted funding from out of state due to its potential to flip the state senate.

Hill remained popular among constituents of the district and was the chief budget writer for the Republican Party during his second term; the Republican Party had also considered him as a potential gubernatorial candidate. He died of lung cancer on October 31, 2016. Two-time unsuccessful gubernatorial and U.S. Senate candidate Dino Rossi was appointed by the Republican Party and Metropolitan King County Council to fill the vacant seat. Rossi declined to run for election to the seat, leaving the 2017 special election open for candidates of both major parties.

Prior to the election, majority control of the 49-member state senate rested with the 25 members of the Majority Coalition Caucus, composed of 24 Republicans and one self-identified Democrat. The Governor's office and a narrow majority in the state House of Representatives were both held by the Democrats. The change of party for the 45th district, the most competitive of several special elections for the state senate in 2017, would complete a Democrat trifecta for the 2018 legislative session. The Democrats last held a trifecta in the Washington state government from 2005 to 2012.

== Candidates ==
The district's Democratic representatives, Larry Springer and Roger Goodman, both declined to run for the seat. Deputy King County prosecutor Manka Dhingra emerged as an early Democratic front-runner, announcing her candidacy in February and earning the 45th District Democrats's endorsement in April. Dhingra, a Sikh, immigrated to the United States from India with her family at the age of 13 and was raised in California. She has been part of the King County Prosecutor's Office since 2000, supervising the regional mental health and veteran court systems. Dhingra was involved in various non-profit organizations centered around advocacy for mental health and domestic violence survivors; she described herself as non-partisan until the 2016 presidential election. Ian Stratton, a Democratic activist from Sammamish, initially filed to run but dropped out before the primary election.

Jinyoung Lee Englund announced her campaign for the Republican nominating in April, after being recruited by Dino Rossi. Englund was born in South Korea and raised in University Place, attending the University of Washington. She worked for Christian missionary organization Iris Global in Mozambique before returning to Washington as an aide to Republican congresswoman Cathy McMorris Rodgers. Englund also worked for Dino Rossi's unsuccessful Senate campaign in 2010, for Elaine Chao at The Heritage Foundation, and as an advocate for Bitcoin. A second Republican candidate, Ken Smith, filed to run but withdrew in May.

Parker Harris, a teacher and engineer from Woodinville, filed to run as an independent candidate in May.

== Campaign ==
=== Endorsements ===
Dhingra attracted endorsements from local and prominent national Democrats, including former Vice President Joe Biden, U.S. Senators Patty Murray and Maria Cantwell, Governor Jay Inslee, and King County Executive Dow Constantine.

=== Fundraising ===
The election generated national interest due to its potential to determine control of the state government. During the primary campaign, a total $3 million in campaign contributions were reported for the Democratic and Republican candidates. By the end of the general campaign in November, a total of $9 million had been spent in the race, making it the costliest ever for a Washington state legislative election. A total of $4.2 million was raised by Democrats for Dhingra, and $4.8 million by Republicans for Englund. Negative campaign ads cost $1.8 million for Democratic supporters and $2.5 million for Republican supporters.

=== Advertising ===
The national prominence and fundraising for the election brought an unusually large number of attack ads and amount of advertising to the Eastside. Several ads from both campaigns were criticized for misleading the public on the candidate's histories and past political positions. The Republican campaign, without authorization from Englund, produced a series of spoof advertisements that painted Dhingra supporters as stereotypical "Seattle liberals".

=== Primary election results ===
The primary election garnered $3 million in total fundraising. Dhingra won the primary election, with 51 percent of the vote, followed by Englund with 41 percent and Harris with 7 percent. Dhingra and Englund advanced to the general election.

Primary election August 1, 2017
Party	Candidate	Votes	%
Democratic	Manka Dhingra	19,707	51.49
Republican	Jinyoung Lee Englund	15,856	41.43
Independent	Parker Harris	2,685	7.02
Total votes		38,889	100

=== General election polling ===
Poll source	Date(s) administered	Sample size	Margin of error	Manka Dhingra (D)	Jinyoung Lee Englund (R)	Undecided
Myers Research & Strategic Services	September 5–10, 2017	400	± 4.9%	51%	41%	8%

=== General election results ===
In the second round, with over $9 million spent on the election through campaign contributions and political action committee expenditures, with a small number of votes yet to be counted, Manka Dhingra led Republican Jinyoung Englund by over a 10% margin. Anticipating the Dhingra victory, Democrat Senate Democratic Minority Leader Sharon Nelson had described a comprehensive agenda for the 60-day legislative session beginning in January that included proposed voting rights reform and campaign-finance disclosure revision, as well as women's reproductive health, clean energy and firearms safety measures.

General election November 7, 2017
Party	Candidate	Votes	%
Democratic	Manka Dhingra	27,755	55.21
Republican	Jinyoung Lee Englund	22,361	44.48
Total votes		50,939	100
Democratic gain from Republican			

== Aftermath ==
Dhingra's election gave the Democratic Party a one-seat majority in the state senate, completing one-party rule of the state legislative and executive branches. Washington joined the states of California and Oregon to complete a "blue wall" along the West Coast, all sharing a Democrat government trifecta. Dhingra was named as the deputy majority leader in the Senate and assigned as the chair of the Behavioral Health Subcommittee. She retained the 45th district seat by being re-elected in 2018.
