= 2016 United States Senate election in Washington =

- November 8, 2016
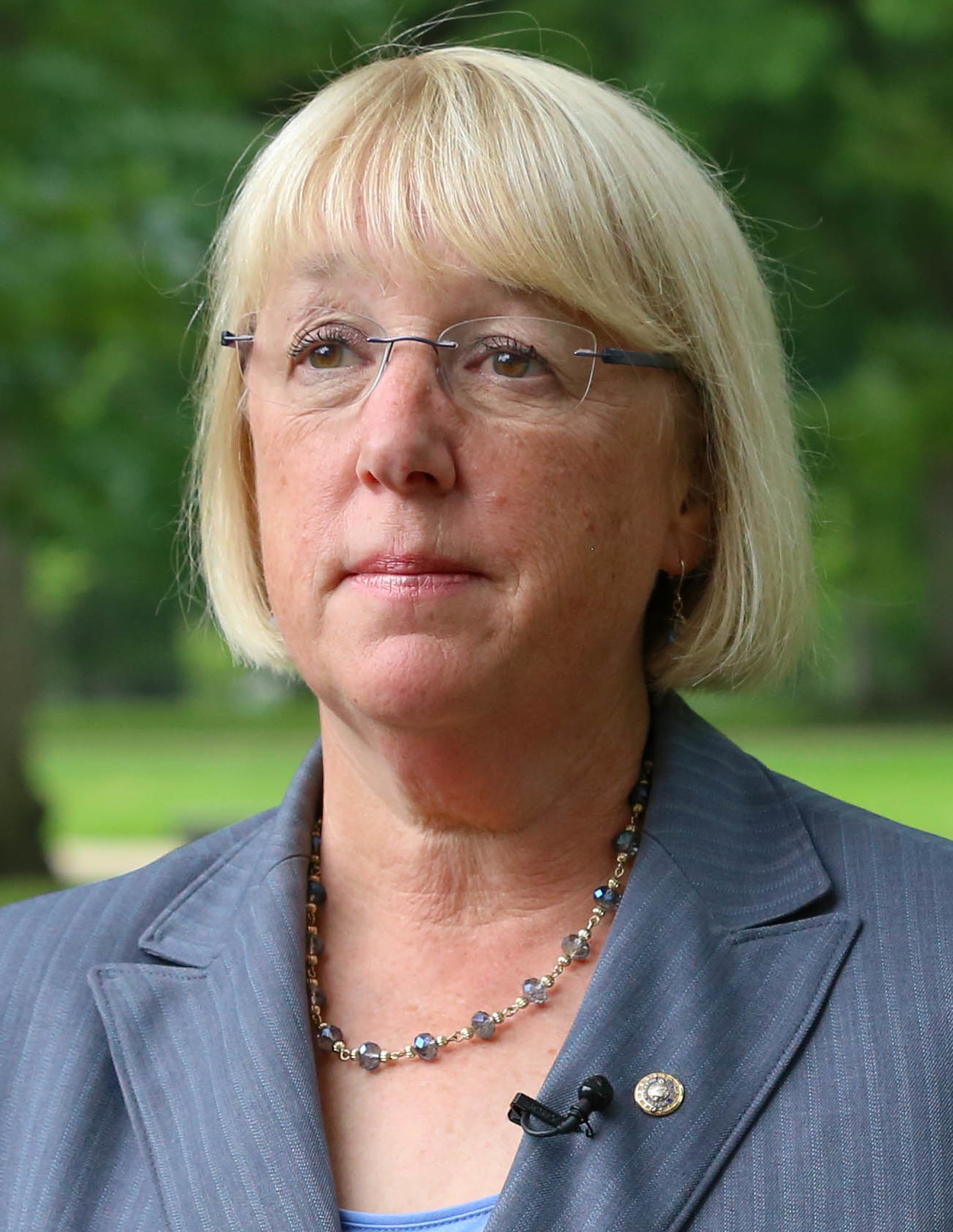

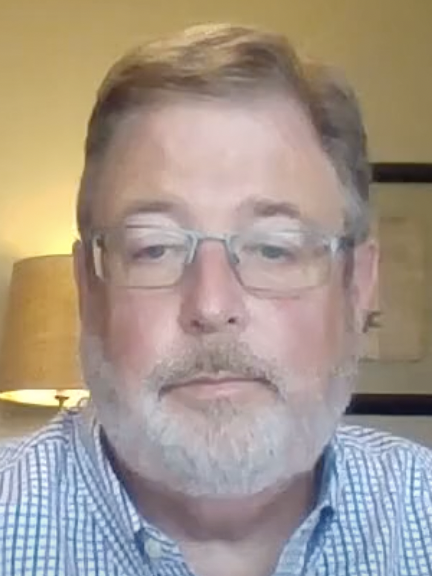
| Nominee | Patty Murray | Chris Vance |
| Party | Democratic | Republican |
| Popular vote | 1,913,979 | 1,329,338 |
| Percentage | 59.01% | 40.99% |
- Murray: 50–60% 60–70% 70–80% 80–90% >90% Vance: 50–60% 60–70% 70–80% 80–90% >90% Tie: 50% No data
U.S. senator before election
Patty Murray
Democratic
Elected U.S. Senator
Patty Murray
Democratic

The 2016 United States Senate election in Washington was held on November 8, 2016, to elect a member of the United States Senate to represent the State of Washington. Incumbent Democratic Senator Patty Murray ran for re-election to a fifth term, and won by a significant margin, winning 59% of the vote, to Republican Chris Vance's 41%.

The election took place concurrently with the 2016 U.S. presidential election, other elections to the United States Senate in other states, elections to the United States House of Representatives, and various state and local elections.

Under Washington's nonpartisan blanket primary law, all candidates appear on the same ballot, regardless of party. In the August 2 primary, voters had the choice to vote for any candidate, regardless of their party affiliation. The top two finishers—regardless of party—would advance to the general election in November, even if a candidate managed to receive a majority of the votes cast in the primary election. California is the only other state with this system, a so-called "top two primary" (Louisiana has a similar "jungle primary", but there is no general election if one candidate receives 50% plus one vote of all votes cast in the primary).

As of 2024, this is the last time a Democrat running statewide for federal office has won Grays Harbor and Mason counties.

== Primary election ==
=== Democratic Party ===
==== Declared ====
- Thor Amundson
- Phil Cornell, retired communications technician
- Patty Murray, incumbent U.S. senator
- Mohammed Said

=== Republican Party ===
==== Declared ====
- Eric John Makus
- Uncle Mover
- Scott Nazarino
- Chris Vance, former state representative, former member of the King County Council, and former chair of the Washington State Republican Party

==== Declined ====
- Bill Bryant, Seattle port commissioner (running for governor)
- Jaime Herrera Beutler, U.S. representative (running for re-election)
- Andy Hill, state senator
- Steve Litzow, state senator (running for re-election)
- Rob McKenna, former attorney general of Washington and nominee for governor in 2012
- Cathy McMorris Rodgers, U.S. representative (running for re-election)
- Dave Reichert, U.S. representative (running for re-election)
- Dino Rossi, former state senator, nominee for governor of Washington in 2004 and 2008, and nominee for U.S. Senate in 2010

=== Third party and independent candidates ===
==== Declared ====
- Pano Churchill (Lincoln Caucus)
- Ted Cummings (independent)
- Zach Haller (independent)
- Chuck Jackson (independent)
- Donna Rae Lands (Conservative)
- Mike Luke (Libertarian)
- Jeremy Teuton (System Reboot)
- Alex Tsimerman (StandUpAmerica)
- Sam Wright (Human Rights)

=== Endorsements ===
Patty Murray (D)

Newspapers

- The Seattle Times

=== Results ===
County results Murray: 30–40%; 40–50%; 50–60%; 60–70%; Vance: 30–40%; 40–50%

Congressional district results Murray: 40–50%; 50–60%; 60–70%; 70–80%; Vance: 30–40%

Blanket primary results
| Party | Candidate | Votes | % |
|---|---|---|---|
| Democratic | Patty Murray (incumbent) | 745,421 | 53.82% |
| Republican | Chris Vance | 381,004 | 27.51% |
| Republican | Eric John Makus | 57,825 | 4.18% |
| Democratic | Phil Cornell | 46,460 | 3.35% |
| Republican | Scott Nazarino | 41,542 | 3.00% |
| Libertarian | Mike Luke | 20,988 | 1.52% |
| Democratic | Mohammad Said | 13,362 | 0.96% |
| Independent | Donna Rae Lands | 11,472 | 0.83% |
| Independent | Ted Cummings | 11,028 | 0.80% |
| Independent | Sam Wright | 10,751 | 0.78% |
| Republican | Uncle Mover | 8,569 | 0.62% |
| Independent | Jeremy Teuton | 7,991 | 0.58% |
| Democratic | Thor Amundson | 7,906 | 0.57% |
| Independent | Chuck Jackson | 6,318 | 0.46% |
| Independent | Pano Churchill | 5,150 | 0.37% |
| Independent | Zach Haller | 5,092 | 0.37% |
| Independent | Alex Tsimerman | 4,117 | 0.30% |
| Total votes | | 1,384,996 | 100.00% |

Counties that flipped from Republican to Democratic

- Asotin (largest city: Clarkston)
- Clallam (largest city: Port Angeles)
- Clark (largest city: Vancouver)
- Cowlitz (largest city: Longview)
- Island (largest city: Oak Harbor)
- Kitsap (largest city: Bremerton)
- Mason (largest city: Shelton)
- Okanogan (largest city: Omak)
- Pierce (largest city: Tacoma)
- Skagit (largest city: Mount Vernon)
- Skamania (largest city: Carson)
- Snohomish (largest city: Everett)
- Spokane (largest city: Spokane)
- Wahkiakum (largest city: Puget Island)
- Walla Walla (largest city: Walla Walla)
- Whatcom (largest city: Bellingham)
- Whitman (largest city: Pullman)

==== By congressional district ====
| District | Murray | Vance | Representative |
|---|---|---|---|
| 1st | 50% | 32% | Suzan DelBene |
| 2nd | 54% | 27% | Rick Larsen |
| 3rd | 45% | 31% | Jaime Herrera Beutler |
| 4th | 38% | 39% | Dan Newhouse |
| 5th | 43% | 31% | Cathy McMorris Rodgers |
| 6th | 53% | 28% | Derek Kilmer |
| 7th | 79% | 11% | Jim McDermott |
| 8th | 45% | 36% | Dave Reichert |
| 9th | 65% | 21% | Adam Smith |
| 10th | 51% | 29% | Denny Heck |

== General election ==
=== Debates ===
| Dates | Location | Murray | Vance | Link |
|---|---|---|---|---|
| October 16, 2016 | Seattle, Washington | Participant | Participant | |
| October 23, 2016 | Redmond, Washington | Participant | Participant | |

=== Predictions ===
| Source | Ranking | As of |
|---|---|---|
| The Cook Political Report | Safe D | November 2, 2016 |
| Sabato's Crystal Ball | Safe D | November 7, 2016 |
| Rothenberg Political Report | Safe D | November 3, 2016 |
| Daily Kos | Safe D | November 8, 2016 |
| Real Clear Politics | Safe D | November 7, 2016 |

=== Polling ===
| Poll source | Date(s) administered | Sample size | Margin of error | Patty Murray (D) | Chris Vance (R) | Other | Undecided |
|---|---|---|---|---|---|---|---|
| SurveyMonkey | November 1–7, 2016 | 1,451 | ± 4.6% | 59% | 37% | — | 4% |
| Insights West | November 4–6, 2016 | 402 | ± 4.9% | 53% | 37% | — | 11% |
| SurveyMonkey | October 31–November 6, 2016 | 1,292 | ± 4.6% | 59% | 37% | — | 4% |
| SurveyMonkey | October 28–November 3, 2016 | 944 | ± 4.6% | 61% | 36% | — | 3% |
| SurveyUSA | October 31–November 2, 2016 | 667 | ± 3.9% | 53% | 41% | — | 6% |
| SurveyMonkey | October 27–November 2, 2016 | 807 | ± 4.6% | 61% | 36% | — | 3% |
| SurveyMonkey | October 26–November 1, 2016 | 698 | ± 4.6% | 61% | 36% | — | 3% |
| SurveyMonkey | October 25–31, 2016 | 745 | ± 4.6% | 61% | 36% | — | 3% |
| Elway Poll | October 20–22, 2016 | 502 | ± 4.5% | 58% | 34% | — | 8% |
| KCTS 9/YouGov | October 6–13, 2016 | 750 | ± 4.4% | 55% | 39% | — | 16% |
| Strategies 360/KOMO News | September 29–October 3, 2016 | 500 | ± 4.4% | 57% | 36% | — | 6% |
| Emerson College | September 25–26, 2016 | 700 | ± 3.6% | 48% | 41% | 3% | 8% |
| Insights West | September 12–14, 2016 | 505 | ± 4.4% | 46% | 25% | 2% | 27% |
| Elway Poll | August 9–13, 2016 | 500 | ± 4.5% | 52% | 34% | — | 14% |
| Elway Poll | April 14–17, 2016 | 503 | ± 3.5% | 50% | 32% | — | 18% |
| Elway Poll | October 13–15, 2015 | 500 | ± 4.5% | 44% | 23% | — | 33% |

Hypothetical polling

with Rob McKenna

| Poll source | Date(s) administered | Sample size | Margin of error | Patty Murray (D) | Rob McKenna (R) | Undecided |
|---|---|---|---|---|---|---|
| Public Policy Polling | May 14–17, 2015 | 879 | ± 3.3% | 46% | 41% | 12% |

with Dave Reichert

| Poll source | Date(s) administered | Sample size | Margin of error | Patty Murray (D) | Dave Reichert (R) | Undecided |
|---|---|---|---|---|---|---|
| Public Policy Polling | May 14–17, 2015 | 879 | ± 3.3% | 48% | 37% | 15% |

with Jaime Herrera Beutler

| Poll source | Date(s) administered | Sample size | Margin of error | Patty Murray (D) | Jaime Herrera Beutler (R) | Undecided |
|---|---|---|---|---|---|---|
| Public Policy Polling | May 14–17, 2015 | 879 | ± 3.3% | 47% | 37% | 17% |

with Cathy McMorris Rodgers

| Poll source | Date(s) administered | Sample size | Margin of error | Patty Murray (D) | Cathy McMorris Rodgers (R) | Undecided |
|---|---|---|---|---|---|---|
| Public Policy Polling | May 14–17, 2015 | 879 | ± 3.3% | 48% | 35% | 17% |

=== Results ===
2016 United States Senate election in Washington
| Party | Candidate | Votes | % | ±% |
|---|---|---|---|---|
| Democratic | Patty Murray (incumbent) | 1,913,979 | 59.01% | +6.65% |
| Republican | Chris Vance | 1,329,338 | 40.99% | −6.65% |
| Total votes | | 3,243,317 | 100.00% | N/A |
| Democratic hold | | | | |

==== By county ====
By county

| County | Patty Murray Democratic | | Chris Vance Republican | | Margin | | Total |
| County | % | # | % | # | % | # | Total |
|---|---|---|---|---|---|---|---|
| Adams | 39.75% | 1,859 | 60.25% | 2,818 | –20.50% | –959 | 4,677 |
| Asotin | 43.59% | 4,248 | 56.41% | 5,497 | –12.82% | –1,249 | 9,745 |
| Benton | 43.47% | 35,680 | 56.53% | 46,397 | –13.06% | –10,717 | 82,077 |
| Chelan | 46.21% | 15,586 | 53.79% | 18,146 | –7.59% | –2,560 | 33,732 |
| Clallam | 52.02% | 20,549 | 47.98% | 18,955 | 4.04% | 1,594 | 39,504 |
| Clark | 51.32% | 102,922 | 48.68% | 97,637 | 2.64% | 5,285 | 200,559 |
| Columbia | 38.94% | 854 | 61.06% | 1,339 | –22.12% | –485 | 2,193 |
| Cowlitz | 49.84% | 22,888 | 50.16% | 23,031 | –0.31% | –143 | 45,919 |
| Douglas | 40.38% | 6,322 | 59.62% | 9,333 | –19.23% | –3,011 | 15,655 |
| Ferry | 42.00% | 1,520 | 58.00% | 2,099 | –16.00% | –579 | 3,619 |
| Franklin | 44.93% | 10,766 | 55.07% | 13,197 | –10.14% | –2,431 | 23,963 |
| Garfield | 38.66% | 486 | 61.34% | 771 | –22.67% | –285 | 1,257 |
| Grant | 35.95% | 10,329 | 64.05% | 18,404 | –28.10% | –8,075 | 28,733 |
| Grays Harbor | 53.37% | 15,433 | 46.63% | 13,483 | 6.74% | 1,950 | 28,916 |
| Island | 54.53% | 23,695 | 45.47% | 19,761 | 9.05% | 3,934 | 43,456 |
| Jefferson | 68.75% | 14,098 | 31.25% | 6,408 | 37.50% | 7,690 | 20,506 |
| King | 72.70% | 728,113 | 27.30% | 273,410 | 45.40% | 454,703 | 1,001,523 |
| Kitsap | 56.73% | 71,784 | 43.27% | 54,746 | 13.47% | 17,038 | 126,530 |
| Kittitas | 46.18% | 8,830 | 53.82% | 10,292 | –7.65% | –1,462 | 19,122 |
| Klickitat | 47.36% | 5,121 | 52.64% | 5,692 | –5.28% | –571 | 10,813 |
| Lewis | 38.36% | 13,266 | 61.64% | 21,319 | –23.28% | –8,053 | 34,585 |
| Lincoln | 33.62% | 1,943 | 66.38% | 3,837 | –32.77% | –1,894 | 5,780 |
| Mason | 52.05% | 14,848 | 47.95% | 13,677 | 4.11% | 1,171 | 28,525 |
| Okanogan | 46.91% | 8,095 | 53.09% | 9,160 | –6.17% | –1,065 | 17,255 |
| Pacific | 55.26% | 5,951 | 44.74% | 4,819 | 10.51% | 1,132 | 10,770 |
| Pend Oreille | 40.40% | 2,775 | 59.60% | 4,093 | –19.19% | –1,318 | 6,868 |
| Pierce | 55.44% | 196,171 | 44.56% | 157,644 | 10.89% | 38,527 | 353,815 |
| San Juan | 71.59% | 7,789 | 28.41% | 3,091 | 43.18% | 4,698 | 10,880 |
| Skagit | 53.47% | 30,572 | 46.53% | 26,600 | 6.95% | 3,972 | 57,172 |
| Skamania | 47.72% | 2,688 | 52.28% | 2,945 | –4.56% | –257 | 5,633 |
| Snohomish | 57.65% | 201,915 | 42.35% | 148,325 | 15.30% | 53,590 | 350,240 |
| Spokane | 49.25% | 113,717 | 50.75% | 117,197 | –1.51% | –3,480 | 230,914 |
| Stevens | 35.47% | 8,150 | 64.53% | 14,830 | –29.07% | –6,680 | 22,980 |
| Thurston | 59.76% | 78,158 | 40.24% | 52,623 | 19.53% | 25,535 | 130,781 |
| Wahkiakum | 48.12% | 1,129 | 51.88% | 1,217 | –3.75% | –88 | 2,346 |
| Walla Walla | 49.37% | 12,645 | 50.63% | 12,969 | –1.26% | –324 | 25,614 |
| Whatcom | 59.44% | 65,830 | 40.56% | 44,924 | 18.88% | 20,906 | 110,754 |
| Whitman | 54.23% | 9,527 | 45.77% | 8,040 | 8.46% | 1,487 | 17,567 |
| Yakima | 48.16% | 37,727 | 51.84% | 40,612 | –3.68% | –2,885 | 78,339 |
| Total | 59.01% | 1,913,979 | 40.99% | 1,329,338 | 18.03% | 584,641 | 3,243,317 |

==== Counties that flipped from Republican to Democratic ====
- Clallam (largest city: Port Angeles)
- Clark (Largest city: Vancouver)
- Island (largest city: Oak Harbor)
- Mason (largest city: Shelton)
- Pierce (largest city: Tacoma)
- Skagit (largest city: Mount Vernon)
- Whitman (Largest city: Pullman)

==== By congressional district ====
Murray won seven of ten congressional districts, including one that elected a Republican.

| District | Murray | Vance | Representative |
|---|---|---|---|
| 1st | 56.25% | 43.75% | Suzan DelBene |
| 2nd | 61.31% | 38.69% | Rick Larsen |
| 3rd | 49.46% | 50.54% | Jaime Herrera Beutler |
| 4th | 44.13% | 55.87% | Dan Newhouse |
| 5th | 47.84% | 52.16% | Cathy McMorris Rodgers |
| 6th | 58.15% | 41.85% | Derek Kilmer |
| 7th | 82.62% | 17.38% | Jim McDermott |
| 7th | 82.62% | 17.38% | Pramila Jayapal |
| 8th | 51.67% | 48.33% | Dave Reichert |
| 9th | 72.08% | 27.92% | Adam Smith |
| 10th | 57.71% | 42.29% | Denny Heck |

== See also ==
- 2016 United States Senate elections
