= Finkbeiner =

Finkbeiner is a surname. Notable people with the surname include:

- Ann Finkbeiner, American science writer
- Bill Finkbeiner (born 1969), American politician
- Carty Finkbeiner (born 1939), American politician
- Felix Finkbeiner (born 1997), German environmentalist
- Kristin Rowe-Finkbeiner (born 1969), American author, speaker and radio host
- Lloyd Finkbeiner (1920–1998), Canadian ice hockey player
