= Manka Dhingra =

Indian and American attorney and politician

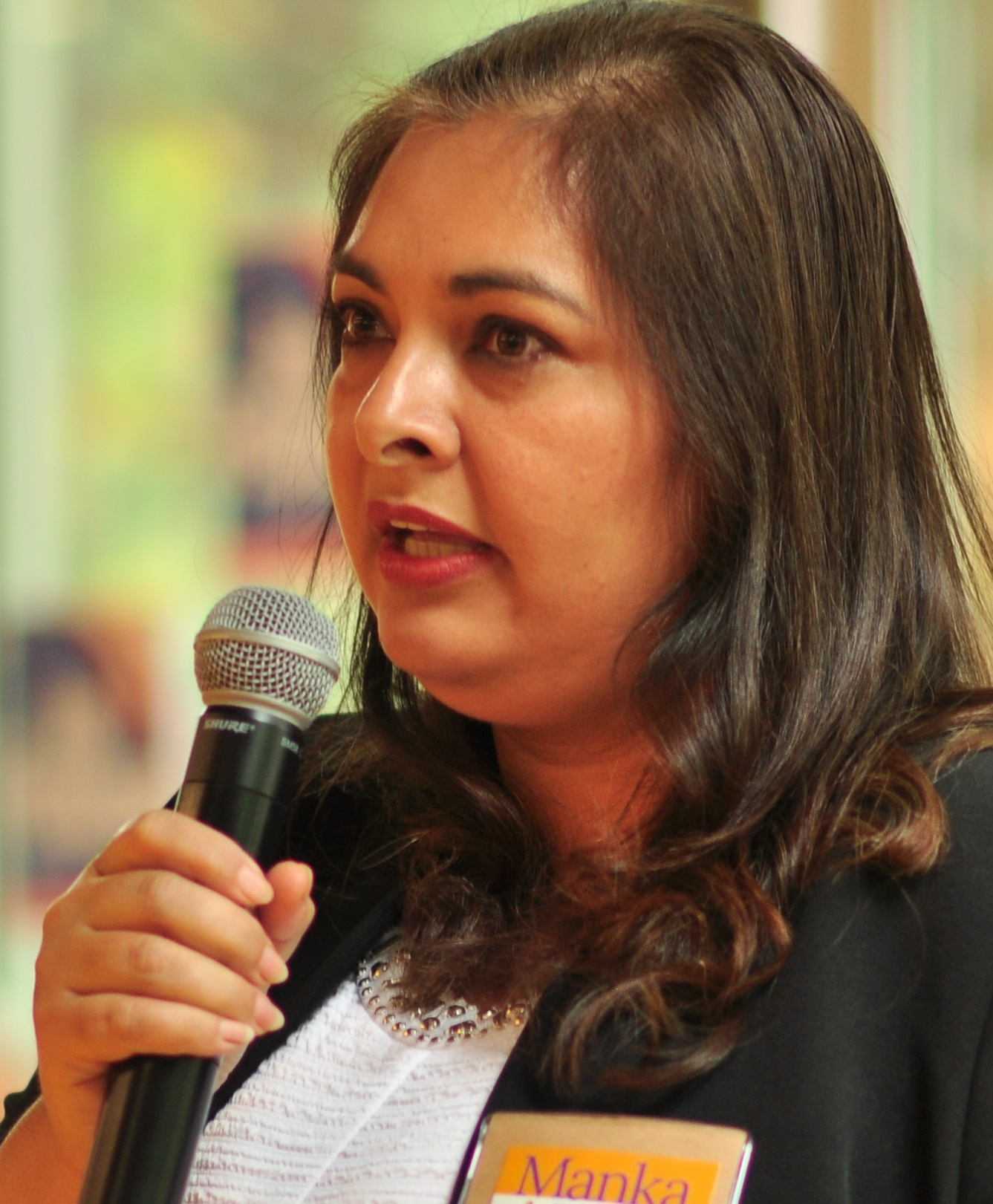
- Dhingra in 2017

Member of the Washington State Senate
- Incumbent
- Assumed office November 29, 2017
- Preceded by: Dino Rossi
- Constituency: 45th district

Personal details
- Born: 1973 or 1974 (age 52) Bhopal, India
- Party: Independent (before 2016); Democratic (2016–present)
- Spouse: Harjit Singh
- Children: 2
- Education: University of California, Berkeley (BA); University of Washington (JD)
- Website: Campaign website

Manka Dhingra (born 1973 or 1974) is an Indian-born American attorney and politician who is a Washington State senator. A member of the Democratic Party, she was elected to represent the 45th legislative district, on Seattle's Eastside in King County, during a 2017 special election. Dhingra is the first Sikh elected to any state legislature in the United States.

Dhingra, an Indian immigrant, founded the woman's advocacy organization API Chaya in 1996, and later worked under several elected officials at the state level. She joined the King County Prosecuting Attorney's office in 2000 and led the department's expanding mental health and veterans courts. Dhingra faced criticism in 2023 and 2024 for the data she used to support her positions on police pursuits and for claiming she still worked at the Prosecutor’s Office.

== Early life and education ==
Dhingra was born in Bhopal, India to a Punjabi Sikh family; her father worked for Union Carbide and her mother was a schoolteacher. After her father died of colon cancer, Dhingra moved to California with her mother at the age of 13, joining her relatives. She graduated from the University of California, Berkeley, earning a Bachelor of Arts in history and political science in 1995, before moving with her husband Harjit Singh to Redmond, Washington.

== Career ==
Dhingra founded Chaya, a non-profit organization to combat domestic violence against South Asian women, in 1996. She would later work in the offices of state Supreme Court justice Barbara Madsen and the Attorney General Christine Gregoire, while earning a degree from the University of Washington School of Law in 1999. Dhingra joined the King County Prosecuting Attorney's office in 2000 and served as a Senior Deputy Prosecuting Attorney for King County; she was last in that role in 2021. Her work in the office's mental health court and the King County District Court Regional Veterans Court earned membership in various mental health and anti-hate crime advocacy organizations.

Dhingra identified herself as a nonpartisan prior to the 2016 presidential election. A few months after attending her first Democratic meeting, she declared her candidacy for the special election created by the death of Republican Andy Hill. Dhingra defeated Jinyoung Englund, the Republican nominee, on November 7, 2017, with 55% of the votes. Dhingra's election overturned the Republican coalition majority in the Washington State Senate, giving the Washington Democratic Party complete control over the state's government for the first time since 2012. She was sworn in on November 29 and became the first Sikh woman to enter a state legislature. Dhingra was named as the deputy majority leader in the Senate and assigned as the chair of the Behavioral Health Subcommittee. She retained the 45th district seat by being re-elected in 2018 and 2022.

In 2023, Dhingra was fined by Washington’s Legislative Ethics Board.

That same year, Dhingra received media coverage of her stances on restoring Washington’s reasonable suspicion standard for police pursuit, including refusing to hold a hearing for a relevant bill in a committee she chairs and promoting problematic data about pursuits. In 2024, Dhingra was criticized for limiting public testimony during a hearing she oversaw about Initiative 2113.

She ran in the 2024 Washington Attorney General election to become Attorney General of Washington, as the position was being vacated by Bob Ferguson, who successfully ran for Washington State Governor. During the campaign, Dhingra was criticized for claiming she was still formally associated with the King County Prosecuting Attorney’s Office. Following that criticism, her campaign website was eventually updated, without including an admission of fault on Dhingra’s behalf. Dhingra came third in the top-two primary, and the election was ultimately won by Nick Brown.

In 2025, Dhingra introduced a bill to repeal state code criminalizing concealed births.

== Personal life ==
Dhingra met her husband, Harjit Singh, while at the University of California, Berkeley. The couple have two children.
