= John W. Betrozoff =

American politician

Member of the Washington House of Representatives from the 45th district
- In office January 10, 1983 – January 11, 1993
- Preceded by: Rod Chandler
- Succeeded by: Bill Finkbeiner

Personal details
- Born: c. January 22, 1935 (age 91) Raymond, WA
- Party: Republican
- Spouse(s): Sara Jo (to 10/1/2004), Sylvia Jean Simpson (2009 to present)
- Children: none
- Education: Grays Harbor College, Western Washington University, University of Washington
- Occupation: Education, real estate investor, legislator

John W. Betrozoff (born c. 1935 in Raymond, Washington) was an American politician in the state of Washington. Before serving in the House he was a teacher, principal and central office administrator in the Bellevue School District, east of Seattle. He served in the Washington House of Representatives from 1983 to 1992 where he was the lead Republican on Education issues. He served on the Legislative Ethics Committee after 1992 for five years.
