= Paul Akers =

American businessman (born 1960)

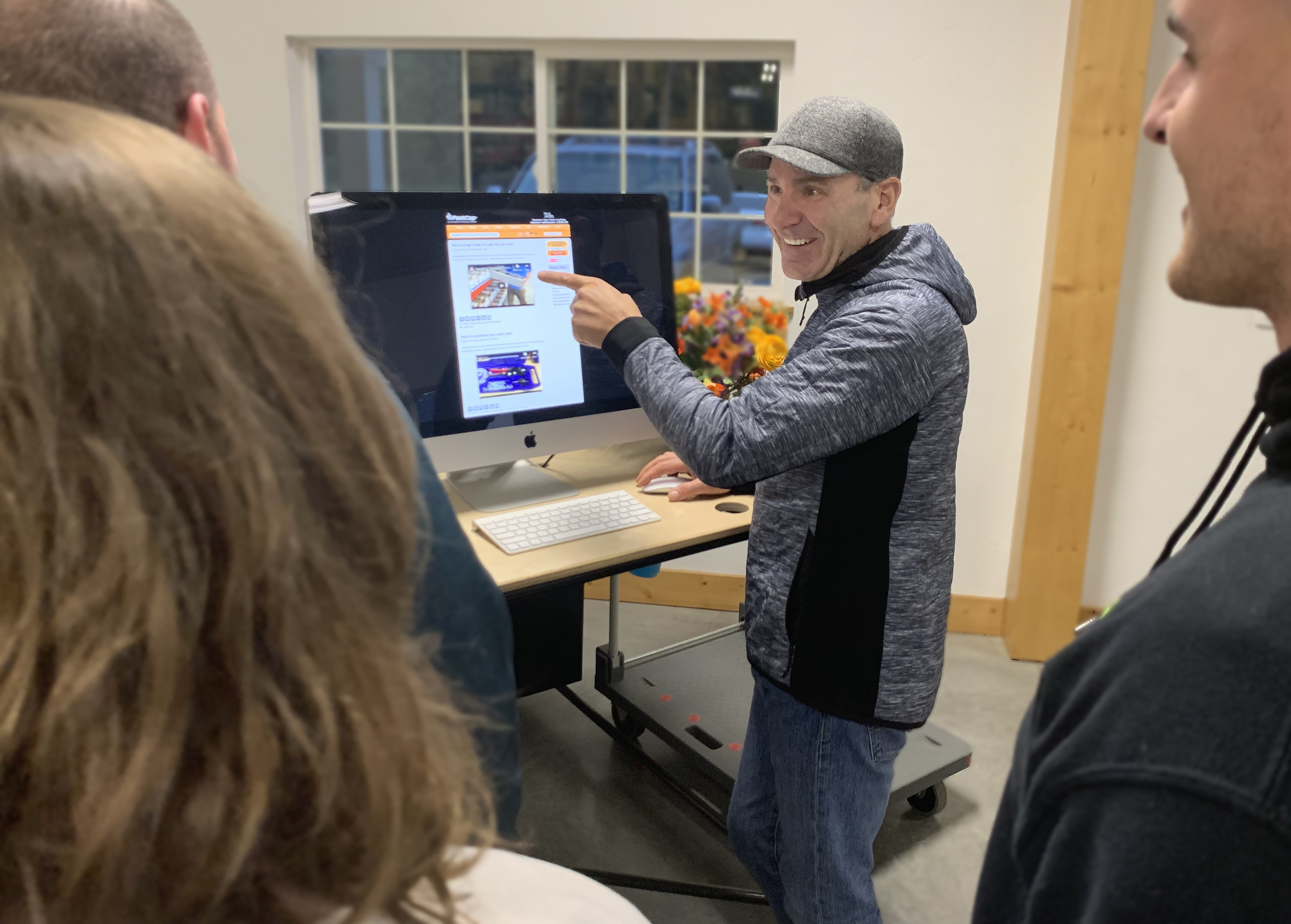
- Akers teaching workers at FastCap
- Born: May 7, 1960 (age 66); San Diego, California, U.S
- Other name: Paul A. Akers
- Education: Biola University
- Occupations: Author, business owner, YouTuber
- Notable work: 2 Second Lean, Lean Health, Lean Travel, Lean Life, Banish Sloppiness
- Spouse: Leanne Akers
- Children: 2
- Website: paulakers.net

Paul Andre Akers is an American author and businessman. Akers is the founder and president of FastCap, a product development company that specializes in woodworking tools.

== Career ==
Akers started building guitars with his mentor Bob Taylor at Taylor Guitars and Musical Instruments in California right out of high school. He then graduated with a degree in education from Biola University and started his career in inner-city ministry in the Los Angeles area as a pastor with his wife Leanne. He worked as a teacher, and then as a carpenter.

In his garage in 1997, Akers developed his first product: the FastCap. It was a technique to cover and hide screw holes with a tiny adhesive cap that blends in with the wood around it. That idea turned into a manufacturing business. Overwhelmed with a multitude of tasks, personnel, and major financial decisions he faced on a daily basis, Akers began using the concepts of Lean manufacturing and the Toyota Production System (TPS), which he credits for propelling FastCap forward.

Akers is also an author, lean teacher, YouTuber, and works as a speaker and consultant offering advice to companies and organizations.

== Political life ==
In 2010 Akers set his sights on politics, running for the US Senate in Washington as a Republican. He was defeated in the primary by Dino Rossi.
