= Rod Chandler =

American politician from Washington

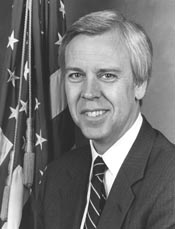

Member of the U.S. House of Representatives from Washington's 8th district
- In office January 3, 1983 – January 3, 1993
- Preceded by: Constituency established
- Succeeded by: Jennifer Dunn

Member of the Washington House of Representatives from the 45th district
- In office January 13, 1975 – January 3, 1983
- Preceded by: Alan Bluechel
- Succeeded by: John W. Betrozoff

Personal details
- Born: Rodney Dennis Chandler; July 13, 1942 (age 84) La Grande, Oregon, U.S.
- Party: Republican
- Spouse: Joyce Chandler
- Children: 2
- Education: Eastern Oregon University (BS); University of Nevada, Las Vegas (MEd)

Military service
- Allegiance: United States
- Branch/service: United States Army
- Years of service: 1959–1964
- Unit: Oregon Army National Guard

Rodney Dennis Chandler (born July 13, 1942) is an American politician and journalist who served five terms as a U.S. representative from Washington from 1983 to 1993.

He is the great-great-grandnephew of long-time U.S. Senator Zachariah Chandler of Michigan.

== Early career ==
Rod Chandler received a B.S. from Eastern Oregon College and a M.Ed. from the University of Nevada, Las Vegas.

Before entering politics, Chandler worked as a television news correspondent and a public relations consultant.

== Political career ==
=== State legislature ===
He was elected to the Washington House of Representatives in 1974.

=== Congress ===
In 1982, he was elected as a Republican to the 98th Congress, representing the newly created 8th congressional district. In that race, he defeated Democratic candidate Beth Bland by a margin of 57% to 43%. He held the seat for five terms, until he gave up his seat for an unsuccessful candidacy for the United States Senate.

In 1989, Chandler revealed publicly that he is a recovering alcoholic.

=== Senate campaign ===
In 1992, one of Washington's U.S. Senate seats came open when the incumbent, Brock Adams, announced his retirement amidst a personal scandal. Democratic state Senator Patty Murray won the Democratic primary and faced Chandler in the general election. For much of the race, Chandler seemed to have the upper hand, but during a debate in the later stages of the campaign he inexplicably responded to Murray's criticism for spending $120,000 on congressional mailings during an economic recession by quoting the Roger Miller song "Dang Me". By association, Chandler was further damaged by the unpopularity in the Pacific Northwest of incumbent President George H. W. Bush, who was largely blamed for the recession.

== Later career ==
Chandler taught Advanced Placement Government classes at Eaglecrest High School in Centennial, Colorado until the end of the 2006–07 school year.

Chandler endorsed Democrat Joe Biden during the 2020 United States presidential election, wanting to prevent the re-election of President Donald Trump. Chandler was one of 12 former Republican U.S. Representatives who filed an amicus brief in Trump v. Anderson, supporting the Colorado Supreme Court's decision to disqualify former President Donald Trump as a candidate in the 2024 Presidential Election.

Chandler is a member of the ReFormers Caucus of Issue One.

== Electoral history ==
U.S. Senator, Class 3, from Washington, 1992 General Election
Party	Candidate	Votes	%	±%
Democratic	Patty Murray	1,197,973	53.99	
Republican	Rod Chandler	1,020,829	46.01	

U.S. Senator, Class 3, from Washington, 1992 Republican Primary Election
Party	Candidate	Votes	%	±%
Republican	Rod Chandler	228,083	42.10	
Republican	Leo K. Thorsness	185,498	34.24	
Republican	Tim Hill	128,232	23.67	

U.S. Representative from Washington's 8th congressional district, 1990 General Election
Party	Candidate	Votes	%	±%
Republican	Rod Chandler (incumbent)	96,323	56.21	−14.66
Democratic	David E. Giles	75,031	43.79	

U.S. Representative from Washington's 8th congressional district, 1990 Republican Primary Election
Party	Candidate	Votes	%	±%
Republican	Rod Chandler (incumbent)	36,551	84.51	−15.49
Republican	Kenneth R. "Ken" Thomasson	6,700	15.49	

U.S. Representative from Washington's 8th congressional district, 1988 General Election
Party	Candidate	Votes	%	±%
Republican	Rod Chandler (incumbent)	174,942	70.87	+5.67
Democratic	Jim Kean	71,920	29.13	

U.S. Representative from Washington's 8th congressional district, 1988 Republican Primary Election
Party	Candidate	Votes	%	±%
Republican	Rod Chandler (incumbent)	76,861	100.00	0.00

U.S. Representative from Washington's 8th congressional district, 1986 General Election
Party	Candidate	Votes	%	±%
Republican	Rod Chandler (incumbent)	107,824	65.20	+2.76
Democratic	David E. Giles	57,545	34.80	

U.S. Representative from Washington's 8th congressional district, 1986 Republican Primary Election
Party	Candidate	Votes	%	±%
Republican	Rod Chandler (incumbent)	36,654	100.00	0.00

U.S. Representative from Washington's 8th congressional district, 1984 General Election
Party	Candidate	Votes	%	±%
Republican	Rod Chandler (incumbent)	146,891	62.44	+5.47
Democratic	Bob Lamson	88,379	37.56	

U.S. Representative from Washington's 8th congressional district, 1984 Republican Primary Election
Party	Candidate	Votes	%	±%
Republican	Rod Chandler (incumbent)	56,456	100.00	+59.12

U.S. Representative from Washington's 8th congressional district, 1982 General Election
Party	Candidate	Votes	%	±%
Republican	Rod Chandler	79,209	56.97	
Democratic	Beth Bland	59,824	43.03	

U.S. Representative from Washington's 8th congressional district, 1982 Republican Primary Election
Party	Candidate	Votes	%	±%
Republican	Rod Chandler	20,374	40.88	
Republican	Bob Eberle	15,342	30.78	
Republican	Paul Barden	12,477	25.04	
Republican	William "Bill" McCallum	1,644	3.30	

State Representative from Washington's 45th legislative district, Position 1 - 1980 General Election
Party	Candidate	Votes	%	±%
Republican	Rod Chandler (incumbent)	30,042	74.76	−25.24
Democratic	R.F. "Dick" Reynolds	10,140	25.24	

State Representative from Washington's 45th legislative district, Position 1 - 1980 Republican Primary Election
Party	Candidate	Votes	%	±%
Republican	Rod Chandler (incumbent)	11,188	100.00	0.00

State Representative from Washington's 45th legislative district, Position 1 - 1978 General Election
Party	Candidate	Votes	%	±%
Republican	Rod Chandler (incumbent)	14,138	100.00	+30.04

State Representative from Washington's 45th legislative district, Position 1 - 1978 Republican Primary Election
Party	Candidate	Votes	%	±%
Republican	Rod Chandler (incumbent)	4,704	100.00	0.00

State Representative from Washington's 45th legislative district, Position 1 - 1976 General Election
Party	Candidate	Votes	%	±%
Republican	Rod Chandler (incumbent)	21,573	69.96	+2.09
Democratic	Bonnie B. Logan	9,263	30.04	

State Representative from Washington's 45th legislative district, Position 1 - 1976 Republican Primary Election
Party	Candidate	Votes	%	±%
Republican	Rod Chandler (incumbent)	8,948	100.00	+22.63

State Representative from Washington's 45th legislative district, Position 1 - 1974 General Election
Party	Candidate	Votes	%	±%
Republican	Rod Chandler	11,876	67.87	
Democratic	Ray Freeman	5,623	32.13	

State Representative from Washington's 45th legislative district, Position 1 - 1974 Republican Primary Election
Party	Candidate	Votes	%	±%
Republican	Rod Chandler	3,928	77.37	
Republican	Ella M. Snyder	757	14.91	
Republican	L.C. Westburg	392	7.72	

U.S. House of Representatives
New constituency	Member of the U.S. House of Representatives from Washington's 8th congressional district 1983–1993	Succeeded by Jennifer Dunn
Party political offices
Preceded by Slade Gorton	Republican nominee for U.S. Senator from Washington (Class 3); 1992	Succeeded by Linda Smith
U.S. order of precedence (ceremonial)
Preceded by Scott Tipton as Former U.S. Representative	Order of precedence of the United States as Former U.S. Representative	Succeeded by Chris Stewart as Former U.S. Representative
