= 1992 United States Senate election in Washington =

- November 3, 1992
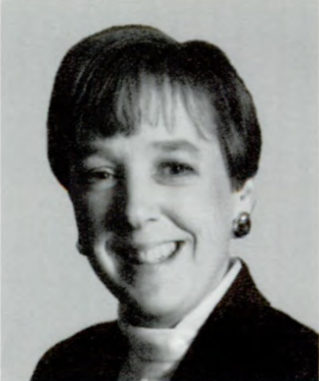

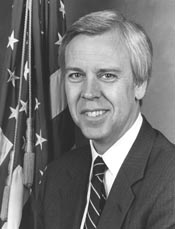
Nominee	Patty Murray	Rod Chandler
Party	Democratic	Republican
Popular vote	1,197,973	1,020,829
Percentage	53.99%	46.01%
- County results Murray: 50–60% 60–70% Chandler: 50–60% 60–70%
U.S. senator before election
Brock Adams
Democratic
Elected U.S. Senator
Patty Murray
Democratic

The 1992 United States Senate election in Washington was held on November 3, 1992. Incumbent Democratic Senator Brock Adams chose not to run for re-election to a second term after eight different women made allegations that he had engaged in various acts of sexual misconduct, including harassment and rape. Adams denied the allegations, but his popularity statewide was weakened considerably by them, and he chose to retire rather than risk costing the party his seat.

State Senator Patty Murray defeated Republican U.S. Representative Rod Chandler in the race to succeed Adams. Chandler seemed to have the upper hand in one of the debates until, for some unknown reason, he quoted the Roger Miller song "Dang Me." He was further damaged by the unpopularity of President George H. W. Bush in the Pacific Northwest.

== Blanket primary ==
=== Candidates ===
==== Democratic ====
- Don Bonker, former U.S. Representative from Vancouver and candidate for Senate in 1988
- Gene Hart
- Patty Murray, State Senator from Bothell
- Jeffery Brian Venezia

==== Independent ====
- LaPriel C. Barnes

==== Republican ====
- Rod Chandler, U.S. Representative from Bellevue
- Leo K. Thorsness, State Senator from Renton
- Tim Hill, King County Executive

==== Socialist Workers ====
- Mark Severs

==== Washington Taxpayers ====
- William Cassius Goodloe, former Chief Justice of the Washington Supreme Court

=== Results ===
Results by county Murray: 20–30%; 30–40%; Chandler: 20–30%; 30–40%; Bonker: 20–30%; 30–40%; 40–50%; Thorsness: 30–40%

1992 U.S. Senate primary
Party	Candidate	Votes	%
Democratic	Patty Murray	318,455	28.32%
Republican	Rod Chandler	228,083	20.28%
Democratic	Don Bonker	208,321	18.52%
Republican	Leo K. Thorsness	185,498	16.49%
Republican	Tim Hill	128,232	11.40%
Democratic	Gene D. Hart	15,894	1.41%
Democratic	Marshall	11,659	1.04%
Washington Taxpayers	William Cassius Goodloe	10,877	0.97%
Democratic	Jeffery Brian Venezia	7,259	0.65%
Independent	LaPriel C. Barnes	7,044	0.63%
Socialist Workers	Mark Severs	3,309	0.29%
Total votes		1,124,631	100.00%

== General election ==
=== Results ===
1992 United States Senate election in Washington
Party	Candidate	Votes	%	±%
Democratic	Patty Murray	1,197,973	53.99%	+3.33%
Republican	Rod Chandler	1,020,829	46.01%	–2.66%
Total votes		2,218,802	100.00%	N/A
Democratic hold				

==== By county ====
County results
County	Patty Murray Democratic		Rod Chandler Republican		Margin		Total votes
County	#	%	#	%	#	%	Total votes
Adams	1,656	36.52%	2,879	63.48%	-1,223	-26.97%	4,535
Asotin	3,686	49.88%	3,703	50.12%	-17	-0.23%	7,389
Benton	19,180	37.08%	32,542	62.92%	-13,362	-25.83%	51,722
Chelan	9,174	41.01%	13,195	58.99%	-4,021	-17.98%	22,369
Clallam	13,896	49.34%	14,268	50.66%	-372	-1.32%	28,164
Clark	57,767	55.71%	45,923	44.29%	11,844	11.42%	103,690
Columbia	728	39.22%	1,128	60.78%	-400	-21.55%	1,856
Cowlitz	18,955	56.73%	14,457	43.27%	4,498	13.46%	33,412
Douglas	4,407	40.72%	6,416	59.28%	-2,009	-18.56%	10,823
Ferry	1,213	48.70%	1,278	51.30%	-65	-2.61%	2,491
Franklin	4,852	40.79%	7,042	59.21%	-2,190	-18.41%	11,894
Garfield	468	36.28%	822	63.72%	-354	-27.44%	1,290
Grant	8,485	39.97%	12,741	60.03%	-4,256	-20.05%	21,226
Grays Harbor	15,265	57.04%	11,495	42.96%	3,770	14.09%	26,760
Island	13,721	50.74%	13,320	49.26%	401	1.48%	27,041
Jefferson	7,382	58.59%	5,218	41.41%	2,164	17.17%	12,600
King	458,177	59.64%	310,014	40.36%	148,163	19.29%	768,191
Kitsap	43,413	49.92%	43,547	50.08%	-134	-0.15%	86,960
Kittitas	6,366	52.37%	5,789	47.63%	577	4.75%	12,155
Klickitat	3,547	54.13%	3,006	45.87%	541	8.26%	6,553
Lewis	10,066	37.79%	16,573	62.21%	-6,507	-24.43%	26,639
Lincoln	1,782	36.44%	3,108	63.56%	-1,326	-27.12%	4,890
Mason	10,606	54.40%	8,890	45.60%	1,716	8.80%	19,496
Okanogan	5,855	46.15%	6,832	53.85%	-977	-7.70%	12,687
Pacific	5,464	60.42%	3,579	39.58%	1,885	20.84%	9,043
Pend Oreille	2,158	47.65%	2,371	52.35%	-213	-4.70%	4,529
Pierce	128,681	54.99%	105,346	45.01%	23,335	9.97%	234,027
San Juan	4,008	58.64%	2,827	41.36%	1,181	17.28%	6,835
Skagit	21,037	52.55%	18,992	47.45%	2,045	5.11%	40,029
Skamania	2,059	59.42%	1,406	40.58%	653	18.85%	3,465
Snohomish	107,217	54.45%	89,689	45.55%	17,528	8.90%	196,906
Spokane	77,585	46.61%	88,857	53.39%	-11,272	-6.77%	166,442
Stevens	5,847	41.58%	8,214	58.42%	-2,367	-16.83%	14,061
Thurston	47,337	56.78%	36,038	43.22%	11,299	13.55%	83,375
Wahkiakum	932	54.60%	775	45.40%	157	9.20%	1,707
Walla Walla	9,093	47.46%	10,067	52.54%	-974	-5.08%	19,160
Whatcom	29,836	52.54%	26,950	47.46%	2,886	5.08%	56,786
Whitman	6,610	45.88%	7,798	54.12%	-1,188	-8.25%	14,408
Yakima	29,462	46.62%	33,734	53.38%	-4,272	-6.76%	63,196
Totals	1,197,973	53.99%	1,020,829	46.01%	177,144	7.98%	2,218,802

==== Counties that flipped from Democratic to Republican ====
- Asotin (Largest city: Clarkston)
- Ferry (Largest city: Republic)
- Kitsap (Largest city: Bremerton)
- Pend Oreille (Largest city: Newport)

==== Counties that flipped from Republican to Democratic ====
- Island (Largest city: Oak Harbor)
- Kittitas (Largest city: Ellensburg)
- San Juan (Largest city: Friday Harbor)
- Skagit (Largest city: Mount Vernon)

== See also ==
- 1992 United States Senate elections
