= Eric Oemig =

American politician (born 1967)

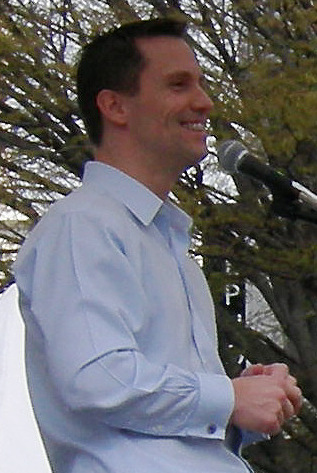
- Oemig in 2007

Member of the Washington Senate from the 45th district
- In office January 8, 2007 – January 10, 2011
- Preceded by: Bill Finkbeiner
- Succeeded by: Andy Hill

Personal details
- Born: November 5, 1967 (age 58) Beaver Dam, Wisconsin, U.S.
- Party: Democratic
- Spouse: Mary Oemig
- Children: 1
- Education: University of Wisconsin–Madison (BS)

Eric W. Oemig (born November 5, 1967) is an American politician and engineer who served as a member of the Washington State Senate, representing the 45th district from 2007 to 2011. A member of the Democratic Party, he was elected to the Senate in 2006. Prior to politics, Oemig worked at several tech companies, including Microsoft, where he was a performance manager.

In 2007, Oemig introduced and passed an education performance bill to track student, teacher, and school performance data. In 2008, he passed a budget data bill requiring budget performance data to be presented on the web with fly-thru pie charts and searchable links.

Other focus areas for Oemig included:

- Locally controlled elections – improving election performance by discouraging non-community interests from campaign contributions. In 2010, Oemig won the Public Leadership Award from Washington Public Campaigns.
- Green vaccines – improving public health performance by eliminating poisons from vaccines and reducing vaccine injury and death
- Peak oil – improving economic performance by mitigating the local impact of hyper inflation
- Toxics in people – improving personal health performance by removing toxic ingredients from consumer products

In the 2010 legislative session, Oemig served as vice chair of the Education K–12 Committee, vice chair of the Government Operations & Elections Committee, and as a member of the Ways & Means Committee and the Water, Environment & Energy Committee.

In 2010, Oemig lost his bid for reelection to Republican Andy Hill.
