= King County District Court Regional Veterans Court =

The King County District Court Regional Veterans Court is the veterans court component of King County District Court, Washington's largest court of limited jurisdiction, including the city of Seattle. The regional court was established in June 2012, and was intended to divert nonviolent veterans to mental health and drug treatment programs. By September 2014, the court had served over 50 veterans.

State senator Manka Dhingra helped create the court when she worked for the county prosector's office.
