= Jay Rodne =

American politician (born 1966)

Member of the Washington House of Representatives from the 5th district
- In office January 20, 2004 – January 14, 2019
- Preceded by: Cheryl Pflug
- Succeeded by: Bill Ramos

Snoqualmie City Council, Position No. 5
- In office January 1, 2002 – January 20, 2004
- Preceded by: Cathy (Runkle) Reed
- Succeeded by: Maria Henriksen

Personal details
- Born: Jay Robert Rodne; March 21, 1966 (age 60) Minnesota
- Party: Republican
- Spouse: Heidi Lynne Rodne
- Education: Creighton University (BA); Gonzaga University (JD); University of Washington (MHA)
- Profession: Lawyer
- Website: Official

Military service
- Allegiance: United States
- Branch/service: United States Marine Corps
- Years of service: 1989 – 1993 [4 years] (active); 1993 – present [33 years] (reserve)
- Rank: Colonel

Jay Robert Rodne (born March 21, 1966) is an American lawyer and politician of the Republican Party. He is a former member of the Washington House of Representatives, representing the 5th Legislative District. Rodne is of Bad River Band of the Lake Superior Tribe of Chippewa Indians ancestry. He was appointed to the House in 2004 and did not seek reelection in 2018.

== Career ==
Rodne was the primary sponsor for 13 bills in the 2015–2016 session. His most recent co-sponsored bill was HB 2453 that passed unanimously and is designed to improve oversight at state mental hospitals. His committee assignments included Transportation, Health Care and Wellness, and Judiciary, where he was the ranking minority member.

Rodne is a Colonel in the USMC Reserve. He has been the commanding officer of 4th Landing Support Battalion, headquartered in Fort Lewis, Washington. He deployed overseas as part of Operation Iraqi Freedom in 2003. During his active duty years, he deployed to Operation Restore Hope in Somalia and Operation Desert Shield/Desert Storm in the Persian Gulf War.

=== Comments about Islam ===
Following the November 2015 Paris attacks which ISIS claimed responsibility for, Rodne made a Facebook post claiming that President Obama "wants to import 1.5 million Muslims into the U.S." The Seattle Times found Rodne's claim to be false. After receiving criticism for his comments, Rodne said, "The majority of the world's 1.2 billion Muslims are peaceful and want nothing more than to live in peace. And if they are here in America, they want nothing more than to live and enjoy our freedoms."

=== Lobbying career ===
In April 2019, he registered as a foreign agent to consult and lobby for the Kingdom of Cambodia. His consulting company co-owned with state senator Doug Ericksen will be paid $500,000 a year to arrange official visits between the countries and business leaders.
