= Bill Finkbeiner =

American politician (born 1969)

Majority Leader of the Washington Senate
- In office December 23, 2003 – January 10, 2005
- Preceded by: James E. West
- Succeeded by: Lisa Brown

Minority Leader of the Washington Senate
- In office January 10, 2005 – November 29, 2005
- Preceded by: Lisa Brown
- Succeeded by: Mike Hewitt

Member of the Washington Senate from the 45th district
- In office January 9, 1995 – January 8, 2007
- Preceded by: Alan Bluechel
- Succeeded by: Eric Oemig

Member of the Washington House of Representatives from the 45th district
- In office January 11, 1993 – January 9, 1995
- Preceded by: John W. Betrozoff
- Succeeded by: Kathy Lambert

Personal details
- Born: May 5, 1969 (age 57) Seattle, Washington, U.S.
- Party: Republican (1994–present)
- Other political affiliations: Democratic (before 1994)
- Spouse: Kristin Rowe-Finkbeiner
- Children: 2
- Education: Whitman College, University of Washington (MBA)
- Occupation: Politician; Businessman

William E. Finkbeiner (born May 5, 1969) is an American businessman and politician who served as a member of the Washington State Senate, representing the 45th district from 1995 to 2007. Originally a Democrat, he became a Republican in 1994 following the Republican Revolution and served as a member of the Washington House of Representatives from 1993 to 1995. In 2003 he became the youngest Senate Majority Leader in the history of the Washington State Senate. In a return to politics at age 43, he ran unsuccessfully for lieutenant governor in 2012 against incumbent Democrat Brad Owen.

== Early life ==
Finkbeiner was born in Seattle and lives in Kirkland, Washington. He attended Lake Washington High School where he was a three-sport letterman and competed in the state wrestling championships. Finkbeiner graduated from Whitman College in Walla Walla, Washington where he edited The Source magazine and was assistant editor of the school newspaper, The Pioneer. He co-hosted a weekly radio show called Bill and Bill’s Barbecue Blues Hour. In 2007, Bill completed the executive MBA program at the University of Washington.

== Career ==
In 1992, at 23, Finkbeiner was elected to the Washington State House of Representatives as a Democrat from the 45th District (including Kirkland, Redmond, Duval, Carnation) and became the youngest member of that chamber.

In 1994, he left the House of Representatives and switched parties to run as a Republican for the State Senate where became the youngest member of that body. He served in the Washington State Senate from 1994 until 2006.

In 2003, Finkbeiner became the youngest Senate Majority Leader in state history. He was known for his efforts to reduce partisanship, and during his tenure no bill was passed on a party line vote. In 2006, Finkbeiner cast the deciding vote for an anti-discrimination bill for gays and lesbians.

Finkbeiner was a leader in technology and telecommunications issues, where he used his years of experience working in the private sector at Microsoft and other high tech companies to help the state distinguish itself as a policy leader. Bill was the first legislator in the state to use email to communicate with constituents. He worked to get state legislation online. Bill worked closely with the Washington Technology Alliance, and was part of Governor Gary Locke's Digital Education Task Force.

Finkbeiner also worked in the private sector, including at Microsoft as a contract project manager for five years, three years as an executive director in an online education company, and for other high tech companies. Finkbeiner now operates his own business specializing in commercial property management and land development.

== Personal life ==
Finkbeiner married Kristin Rowe in the mid-1990s when he was a state representative. They have two children. He has served on many boards as a volunteer.

Washington State Senate
Preceded by James E. West	Majority Leader of the Washington Senate; 2003–2005	Succeeded by Lisa Brown
