= Cheryl Pflug =

American politician

Member of the Washington Senate from the 5th district
- In office January 5, 2004 – June 30, 2012
- Preceded by: Dino Rossi
- Succeeded by: Dino Rossi

Member of the Washington House of Representatives from the 5th district
- In office January 11, 1999 – January 5, 2004
- Preceded by: Philip E. Dyer
- Succeeded by: Jay Rodne

Personal details
- Born: Cheryl Ann Pflug; February 28, 1957 (age 69)
- Party: Republican
- Spouse: Brian
- Children: 4
- Education: University of Washington (BS), Seattle University (JD)
- Profession: Lawyer; nurse

Cheryl Ann Pflug (born February 28, 1957) is an American lawyer, nurse, and politician who is a member of the Republican Party. She was a member of the Washington State Senate from 2004 to 2012.

== Early life and education ==
Pflug earned her B.S. in Nursing from the University of Washington and worked as a critical care and operating room nurse while raising 4 children on a family farm adjacent to the Cedar River Watershed. She received a J.D. from Seattle University School of Law in 2012 and was admitted to the Bar in 2014.

== State legislature ==
Pflug served the 5th District in the State Legislature for nearly 14 years before being appointed to the Growth Management Hearings Board by Governor Gregoire in May 2012. The 5th District straddles the Urban Growth Line, causing local governments to continually struggle to balance the need for infrastructure and services with a commitment to preserving community character, open space, fish habitat and pristine recreational areas. Over the course of her legislative career, Pflug used her health care experience to improve health outcomes while reducing unnecessary costs, authoring several first-in-the-nation innovations that were adopted into law and pushing through legislation to give the office of the Attorney General strong tools to prosecute multimillion-dollar corporate Medicaid fraud schemes. Pflug also championed infrastructure, education, http://www.issaquahpress.com/2012/05/29/state-sen-cheryl-pflug-departs-suddenly-to-accept-board-post/ hatchery and parks improvements to support the needs of the rapidly growing communities she represented.

As a legislator, Pflug earned a reputation as "an independent workhorse" willing to work across party lines. She crafted legislation to create treatment alternatives for nonviolent mentally-ill misdemeanants and cast the decisive vote to create a simple-majority requirement for school levies. In 2008, Pflug was honored with the commission of Washington General for commitment to her community and service to the state of Washington, and the "Champion of Freedom Award" in 2012.

Often questioned for her growing cynicism, Pflug also paid a price for defying her party leaders but rarely backed down.

== Appointment to the Growth Management Planning Board ==
In May 2012, Governor Christine Gregoire nominated Pflug to a seat on the Growth Management Planning Board.

Following the appointment, Republican Party Chairman Kirby Wilbur suggested the appointment was a "deal" to give the Democrats her Senate seat, an allegation called "hypocritical" by observers.

Pflug resigned her Senate seat on June 30, 2012, the day before her Growth Board appointment commenced on July 1, 2012. On July 11, 2012, Dino Rossi was appointed to fill the term of Pflug. In November 2012, Mark Mullet was elected to represent the 5th legislative district in the senate.

== Post-legislative career ==
In July 2012, Pflug was featured in the first Washington television ad supporting same-sex marriage. The ad aired during the opening ceremonies for the Summer Olympic Games.
