= Kristin Rowe-Finkbeiner =

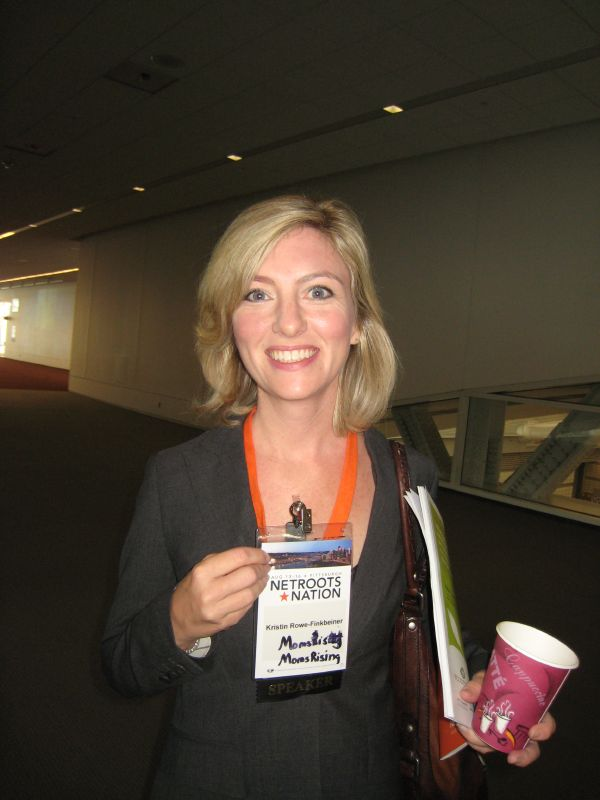
Portrait of Kristin Rowe-Finkbeiner in 2009

Kristin Rowe-Finkbeiner is an American author, speaker, radio host, and the co-founder and executive director/CEO of MomsRising.org. In May 2006 Joan Blades and Rowe-Finkbeiner co-founded MomsRising.

== Biography ==
Kristin Rowe-Finkbeiner is the director of MomsRising. She is also the host of "Breaking Through - Powered by MomsRising" that airs on 1150AM in Seattle, and also airs on other stations across the nation, including TuneIn's Progressive Voices Network, as well as on iTunes and other outlets as a podcast.

In 2005 Rowe-Finkbeiner wrote The F-Word: Feminism in Jeopardy which was awarded first place by the Independent Book Publishers Association in the category of Women's Issues. Rowe-Finkbeiner also co-wrote with Joan Blades The Motherhood Manifesto which won the Ernesta Drinker Ballard Book Prize. In 2018, Rowe-Finkbeiner wrote Keep Marching: How Every Woman Can Take Action and Change Our World.

Rowe-Finkbeiner is married to former Washington State Senator Bill Finkbeiner. They live in Washington state with their two children.

== Honors and awards ==
- Independent Book Publishers Association Award, Women's Issues for The F-Word: Feminism in Jeopardy
- Rockwood Institute Leadership Fellowship
- Hunt Alternatives Fund's Prime Movers: Cultivating Social Capital Fellowship
- Washington State League of Women Voters Good in Government Award
