= 2010 United States Senate election in Washington =

Senate elections held in Washington in 2010

- November 2, 2010
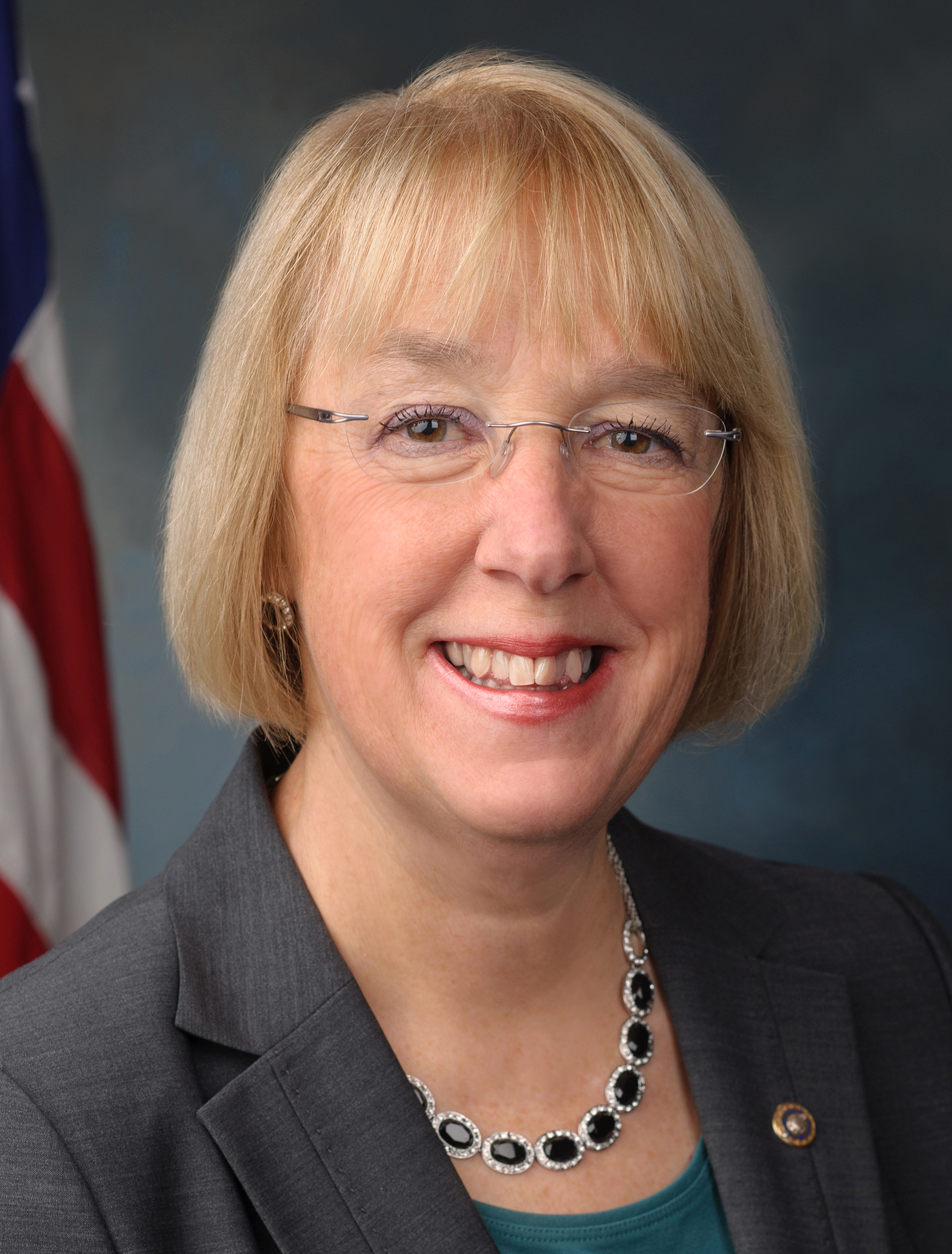

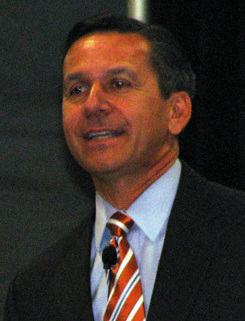
Nominee	Patty Murray	Dino Rossi
Party	Democratic	Republican
Popular vote	1,314,930	1,196,164
Percentage	52.36%	47.64%
- Murray: 50–60% 60–70% 80–90% Rossi: 50–60% 60–70% 70–80%
U.S. senator before election
Patty Murray
Democratic
Elected U.S. Senator
Patty Murray
Democratic

The 2010 United States Senate election in Washington was held on November 2, 2010, alongside other elections to the United States Senate in other states, elections to the United States House of Representatives, and various state and local elections. Incumbent Democratic Senator Patty Murray won re-election to a fourth term by a margin of 52.4% to 47.6% over Republican Dino Rossi, who had run for governor in 2004 and 2008. This was the last U.S. Senate election in Washington in which the margin of victory was single digits.

== Primary election ==
=== Candidates ===
==== Democrats ====
- Charles Allen
- Bob Burr
- Patty Murray, incumbent U.S. senator

==== Republicans ====
- Paul Akers, salesman
- William Chovil
- Clint Didier, former NFL football player
- Norma Gruber
- Michael Latimer
- Dino Rossi, former state senator and gubernatorial candidate

==== Others ====
- Will Baker (Reform Party)
- Schalk Leonard
- Skip Mercer, professor
- Mohammad Said (Centrist Party)

=== Polling ===
Poll source	Dates administered	Patty Murray (D)	Dino Rossi (R)	Clint Didier (R)	Paul Akers (R)	Undecided
Elway Research	April 29 – May 2, 2010	48%	––	4%	8%	36%
Elway Research	June 13, 2010	43%	31%	5%	2%	17%
Survey USA	June 30, 2010	37%	33%	5%	3%	19%
Public Policy Polling	July 27 – August 1, 2010	47%	33%	10%	4%	6%
Survey USA	August 6–9, 2010	41%	33%	11%	5%	4%

=== Results ===
Results by county Murray: 30–40%; 40–50%; 50–60%; 60–70%; Rossi: 30–40%; 40–50%; 50–60%; Didier: 30–40%; 40–50%

Blanket primary election results
Party	Candidate	Votes	%
Democratic	Patty Murray (incumbent)	670,284	46.22%
Republican	Dino Rossi	483,305	33.33%
Republican	Clint Didier	185,034	12.76%
Republican	Paul Akers	37,231	2.57%
Independent	Skip Mercer	12,122	0.84%
Democratic	Charles Allen	11,525	0.79%
Democratic	Bob Burr	11,344	0.78%
Republican	Norma Gruber	9,162	0.63%
Republican	Michael Latimer	6,545	0.45%
Democratic	Mike the Mover	6,019	0.42%
Democratic	Goodspaceguy	4,718	0.33%
Reform	William Baker	4,593	0.32%
Independent	Mohammad Said	3,387	0.23%
Independent	Schalk Leonard	2,818	0.19%
Republican	William Chovil	2,039	0.14%
Total votes		1,450,126	100.00%

== General election ==
=== Candidates ===
The top two candidates from the blanket primary advanced to the general election.

- Patty Murray (D), incumbent U.S. senator
- Dino Rossi (R), former state senator and gubernatorial candidate

=== Campaign ===
Rossi heavily criticized Murray for her support of the 2009 economic stimulus package; however, Rossi's economic promises were nearly identical to those of President Bush, who asked for the stimulus. Rossi supported repealing the Patient Protection and Affordable Care Act and the Dodd-Frank Wall Street Reform and Consumer Protection Act. He also criticized Murray for her support for earmarks. In response, Murray said, "You bet that seniority and leadership has a big thing to do with it, but the other part of it is, I get up every day and I work hard and I believe in this and I am going to continue fighting for the community I represent."

The National Rifle Association spent $414,100 supporting Rossi and opposing Murray in the 2010 senatorial contest.

=== Debates ===
Rossi offered six debates, five of which were in-state, and one national. Murray agreed to two debates, and only two were held.

- Seattle on KOMO-TV.
- Spokane on KSPS-TV and KXLY-TV.

=== Fundraising ===
Candidate (party)	Receipts	Disbursements	Cash on hand	Debt
Patty Murray (D)	$10,951,403	$12,438,133	$1,032,034	$0
Dino Rossi (R)	$7,365,098	$4,331,414	$2,960,039	$0
Source: Federal Election Commission

=== Predictions ===
Source	Ranking	As of
Cook Political Report	Tossup	October 26, 2010
Rothenberg	Tossup	November 1, 2010
RealClearPolitics	Tossup	October 26, 2010
Sabato's Crystal Ball	Lean D	October 21, 2010
CQ Politics	Tossup	October 26, 2010

=== Endorsements ===
Patty Murray (D)

Newspapers

- The Seattle Times

=== Polling ===
Aggregate polls

Source of poll aggregation	Dates administered	Dates updated	Patty Murray (D)	Dino Rossi (R)	Other/Undecided (Note: Calculated by taking the difference of 100% and all other candidates combined.)	Margin
Real Clear Politics	October 24–31, 2010	October 31, 2010	48.3%	48.0%	3.7%	Murray +0.3%

Poll source	Date(s) administered	Sample size	Margin of error	Patty Murray (D)	Dino Rossi (R)	Other	Undecided
Moore Information	January 23–24, 2010	500	± 4.4%	43%	45%	––	––
Rasmussen Reports	February 11, 2010	500	± 4.5%	46%	48%	1%	5%
Rasmussen Reports	March 9, 2010	500	± 4.5%	46%	49%	3%	2%
Research 2000	March 22–24, 2010	600	± 4.0%	52%	41%	––	7%
Rasmussen Reports	April 6, 2010	500	± 4.5%	48%	46%	3%	4%
Survey USA	April 22, 2010	517	± 4.4%	42%	52%	––	7%
The Washington Poll	May 3–23, 2010	626	± 3.9%	44%	40%	––	16%
Rasmussen Reports	May 4, 2010	500	± 4.5%	48%	46%	2%	3%
Rasmussen Reports	May 25, 2010	500	± 4.5%	48%	47%	2%	4%
The Washington Poll	May 24–28, 2010	221	± 6.6%	39%	42%	5%	13%
The Washington Poll	May 28 – June 7, 2010	848	± 3.3%	42%	40%	––	12%
Elway Research	June 13, 2010	405	± 5.0%	47%	40%	––	13%
Rasmussen Reports	June 22, 2010	500	± 4.5%	47%	47%	3%	3%
Rasmussen Reports	July 14, 2010	750	± 4.0%	45%	48%	3%	3%
Rasmussen Reports	July 30, 2010	750	± 4.0%	49%	47%	2%	2%
Public Policy Polling	July 27 – August 1, 2010	1,204	± 2.8%	49%	46%	––	5%
Rasmussen Reports	August 18, 2010	750	± 4.0%	48%	44%	4%	4%
Survey USA	August 18, 2010	618	± 4.0%	45%	52%	––	––
Rasmussen Reports	August 31, 2010	750	± 4.0%	46%	48%	3%	3%
Elway Research	September 9–12, 2010	500	± 4.5%	50%	41%	3%	7%
CNN/Time	September 10–14, 2010	906	± 3.5%	53%	44%	2%	1%
Rasmussen Reports	September 16, 2010	750	± 4.0%	51%	46%	1%	2%
SurveyUSA	September 22, 2010	609	± 4.1%	50%	48%	––	3%
Fox News	September 25, 2010	1,000	± 3.0%	48%	47%	2%	3%
Rasmussen Reports	September 28, 2010	750	± 4.0%	47%	48%	2%	3%
Rasmussen Reports	October 6, 2010	750	± 4.0%	46%	49%	3%	2%
Fox News	October 9, 2010	1,000	± 3.0%	46%	47%	7%	0%
Elway	October 7–11, 2010	450	± 4.6%	55%	40%	0%	5%
CNN/Opinion Research	October 8–12, 2010	850	± 3.5%	51%	43%	2%	0%
The Washington Poll	October 4–14, 2010	500	± 4.3%	50%	42%	––	8%
SurveyUSA	October 11–14, 2010	606	± 4.1%	50%	47%	0%	3%
Public Policy Polling	October 14–16, 2010	1,873	± 2.3%	49%	47%	––	4%
McClatchy/Marist	October 14–17, 2010	589	± 4.0%	48%	47%	1%	5%
Rasmussen Reports	October 17, 2010	750	± 4.0%	49%	46%	2%	3%
Rasmussen Reports	October 27, 2010	750	± 4.0%	47%	48%	3%	2%
SurveyUSA	October 24–27, 2010	678	± 3.8%	47%	47%	––	6%
The Washington Poll	October 18–28, 2010	500	± 4.3%	51%	45%	––	4%
Marist College	October 26–28, 2010	838	± 3.5%	49%	48%	2%	1%
Fox News/Pulse Opinion Research	October 30, 2010	1,000	± 3.0%	49%	47%	4%	0%
YouGov	October 25–30, 2010	850	± 4.1%	50%	48%	0%	2%
Public Policy Polling	October 29–31, 2010	2,055	± 2.2%	48%	50%	0%	2%

=== Results ===
Murray defeated Rossi by about 119,000 votes. King County, the home of Seattle, likely gave Murray a victory.

2010 United States Senate election in Washington
Party	Candidate	Votes	%	±%
Democratic	Patty Murray (incumbent)	1,314,930	52.36%	−2.62%
Republican	Dino Rossi	1,196,164	47.64%	+4.90%
Total votes		2,511,094	100.00%	N/A
Democratic hold				

==== By county ====
By county

County	Patty Murray Democratic		Dino Rossi Republican		Margin		Total
County	%	#	%	#	%	#	Total
Adams	27.26%	1,028	72.74%	2,743	–45.48%	–1,715	3,771
Asotin	39.20%	3,292	60.80%	5,105	–21.59%	–1,813	8,397
Benton	35.67%	22,305	64.33%	40,230	–28.66%	–17,925	62,535
Chelan	36.75%	10,082	63.25%	17,349	–26.49%	–7,267	27,431
Clallam	47.05%	15,639	52.95%	17,602	–5.91%	–1,963	33,241
Clark	45.75%	67,052	54.25%	79,499	–8.49%	–12,447	146,551
Columbia	31.21%	665	68.79%	1,466	–37.59%	–801	2,131
Cowlitz	47.13%	17,331	52.87%	19,443	–5.74%	–2,112	36,774
Douglas	32.66%	4,287	67.34%	8,838	–34.67%	–4,551	13,125
Ferry	36.01%	1,144	63.99%	2,033	–27.98%	–889	3,177
Franklin	34.53%	5,912	65.47%	11,209	–30.94%	–5,297	17,121
Garfield	29.26%	340	70.74%	822	–41.48%	–482	1,162
Grant	28.97%	6,884	71.03%	16,880	–42.06%	–9,996	23,764
Grays Harbor	51.73%	13,086	48.27%	12,209	3.47%	877	25,295
Island	49.74%	17,794	50.26%	17,980	–0.52%	–186	35,774
Jefferson	62.99%	10,917	37.01%	6,413	25.99%	4,504	17,330
King	64.92%	489,190	35.08%	264,368	29.83%	224,822	753,558
Kitsap	51.23%	52,952	48.77%	50,414	2.46%	2,538	103,366
Kittitas	38.63%	5,838	61.37%	9,276	–22.75%	–3,438	15,114
Klickitat	42.89%	3,717	57.11%	4,950	–14.23%	–1,233	8,667
Lewis	33.71%	10,352	66.29%	20,354	–32.57%	–10,002	30,706
Lincoln	31.23%	1,666	68.77%	3,668	–37.53%	–2,002	5,334
Mason	48.97%	12,061	51.03%	12,568	–2.06%	–507	24,629
Okanogan	39.37%	5,766	60.63%	8,881	–21.27%	–3,115	14,647
Pacific	53.11%	5,156	46.89%	4,552	6.22%	604	9,708
Pend Oreille	37.56%	2,165	62.44%	3,599	–24.88%	–1,434	5,764
Pierce	49.79%	132,924	50.21%	134,025	–0.41%	–1,101	266,949
San Juan	65.24%	5,994	34.76%	3,194	30.47%	2,800	9,188
Skagit	48.55%	23,223	51.45%	24,609	–2.90%	–1,386	47,832
Skamania	46.72%	2,118	53.28%	2,415	–6.55%	–297	4,533
Snohomish	51.86%	137,365	48.14%	127,531	3.71%	9,834	264,896
Spokane	43.73%	78,984	56.27%	101,628	–12.54%	–22,644	180,612
Stevens	32.79%	6,379	67.21%	13,076	–34.42%	–6,697	19,455
Thurston	56.16%	58,950	43.84%	46,014	12.32%	12,936	104,964
Wahkiakum	45.14%	915	54.86%	1,112	–9.72%	–197	2,027
Walla Walla	38.84%	8,180	61.16%	12,882	–22.32%	–4,702	21,062
Whatcom	52.49%	44,783	47.51%	40,539	4.97%	4,244	85,322
Whitman	43.04%	5,776	56.96%	7,644	–13.92%	–1,868	13,420
Yakima	36.78%	22,718	63.22%	39,044	–26.43%	–16,326	61,762
Total	52.36%	1,314,930	47.64%	1,196,164	4.73%	118,766	2,511,094

==== Counties that flipped from Democratic to Republican ====
- Clallam (largest city: Port Angeles)
- Cowlitz (largest city: Longview)
- Island (largest city: Oak Harbor)
- Mason (largest city: Shelton)
- Pierce (largest city: Tacoma)
- Skagit (largest city: Mount Vernon)
- Skamania (largest city: Carson)
- Wahkiakum (largest city: Puget Island)

==== By congressional district ====
Murray won five of nine congressional districts.

District	Murray	Rossi	Representative
1st	56%	44%	Jay Inslee
2nd	51%	49%	Rick Larsen
3rd	47%	53%	Brian Baird
3rd	47%	53%	Jaime Herrera Beutler
4th	36%	64%	Doc Hastings
5th	41%	59%	Cathy McMorris Rodgers
6th	53%	47%	Norm Dicks
7th	81%	19%	Jim McDermott
8th	49%	51%	Dave Reichert
9th	53%	47%	Adam Smith
