= 2008 Washington gubernatorial election =

- November 4, 2008
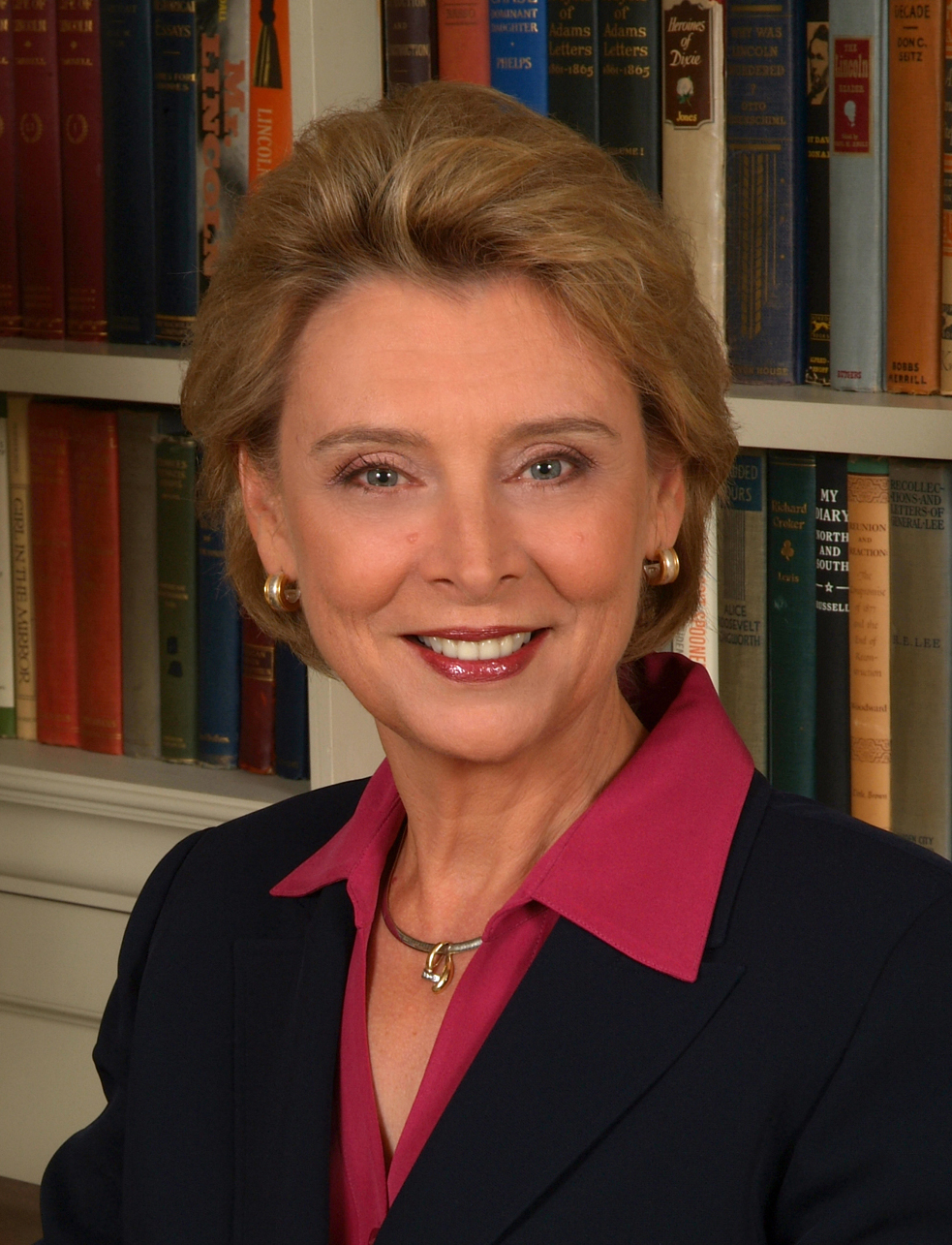

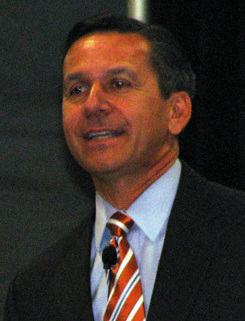
| Candidate | Christine Gregoire | Dino Rossi |
| Party | Democratic | Republican |
| Popular vote | 1,598,738 | 1,404,124 |
| Percentage | 53.24% | 46.76% |
- Gregoire: 50–60% 60–70% 70–80% 80–90% >90% Rossi: 50–60% 60–70% 70–80% 80–90% >90% Tie: 50% No votes
Governor before election
Christine Gregoire
Democratic
Elected Governor
Christine Gregoire
Democratic

The 2008 gubernatorial election in Washington was held on November 4, 2008. Republican Dino Rossi and incumbent Democratic Governor Christine Gregoire emerged from the August 19 primary. This made the 2008 election a rematch between the candidates from the 2004 election, the closest gubernatorial election in the state's history. In contrast to the recounts and months of legal challenges in their previous contest, Gregoire was the clear winner on November 5 with about 53% of the vote.

Rossi outperformed John McCain in the concurrent presidential election by a margin of 10.7%. With a margin of 6.48%, this election was the second-closest race of the 2008 gubernatorial election cycle, behind only the election in North Carolina.

== Timeline ==
| Date | Year | Event | Reference | Notes |
|---|---|---|---|---|
| June 6 | 2008 | Filing deadline | | |
| August 19 | 2008 | State primary | | Same date as general primaries for other offices |
| November 4 | 2008 | General election | | Same date as presidential election and other offices |
| November 26 | 2008 | General election | | Last day for counties to deliver results to the state |
| December 4 | 2008 | General election | | Results certified |

== Primary election ==
Candidates for office
| Candidate | Stated party preference | Website | Notes |
|---|---|---|---|
| Christine Gregoire | Prefers Democratic Party | | Incumbent governor |
| Dino Rossi | Prefers G.O.P. Party | | Ex-state senator, 2004 gubernatorial nominee |
| Will Baker | Prefers Reform Party | | Out; lost primary |
| Duff Badgley | Prefers Green Party | | Out; lost primary |
| John W. Aiken Jr. | Prefers Republican Party | | Out; lost primary |
| Christian Pierre Joubert | Prefers Democratic Party | Archived July 31, 2008, at the Wayback Machine | Out; lost primary |
| Chris Tudor | States No Party Preference | | Out; lost primary |
| Javier O. Lopez | Prefers Republican Party | | Out; lost primary |
| Mohammad Hasan Said | States No Party Preference | | Out; lost primary |
| James White | Prefers Independent Party | | Out; lost primary |

The Washington primary election was held August 19, 2008. For the first time, Washington ran a top-two primary, eliminating the "pick a party" primary used since 2004. Unlike traditional primaries, wherein each party with more than one candidate is reduced to a single person to appear on the general election ballot, the system simply reduces the entire crop of candidates from all parties down to the top two candidates, resulting in no more than two candidates appearing on the general election ballot for a given position. As a result, candidates from all parties were essentially running against each other. To allow for ideological identification, each candidate in a partisan race was allowed to indicate an arbitrary party preference.

=== Controversy over Rossi's party preference ===
Under the changes to election law made by the passage of Initiative 872, partisan contests are no longer tied to registered parties, but candidates are allowed to indicate an arbitrary "party preference" to appear next to their name on the primary and general election ballots. An extreme example of this occurred in the 40th District race for state senator, where candidate Timothy Stoddard indicated a preference for the "Salmon Yoga" party.

Republican candidate Dino Rossi listed his party preference as "G.O.P." instead of the traditional party name "Republican". Critics of Rossi contended that the choice of party name was an attempt to distance himself from any negative opinions associated with the Republican Party. Rossi's campaign argued that the difference was insignificant, saying voters are already aware that the terms refer to the same party. However, an Elway Research poll taken in August 2008 found that over 25% of registered voters were not aware that the term "GOP" meant the Republican Party.

On September 23, the Washington State Democrats, alleging that the latter is a misrepresentation of his true party affiliation, filed a lawsuit against the Secretary of State to force the state to list Rossi to on the general election ballot as a Republican instead of with the "GOP Party" label. A King County Superior Court judge dismissed the suit, saying nothing in state law made the choice of party name illegal, but he acknowledged the potential confusion. Had the lawsuit succeeded, many counties would have had to reprint their ballots, and the already-cast absentee votes of military personnel may have become invalid.

=== Results ===
While the primary was officially held on August 19, 2008, some counties such as King County allowed absentee ballots to be postmarked by that date in order to be valid. As a result, the primary vote tally was not officially certified until September 9, to allow time for mailed-in ballots to arrive and be counted by the counties. As an increasing number of counties allowed, encouraged, or mandated mail-in ballots for voters within the county, the number of such ballots was significant.

County results Gregoire: 40–50%; 50–60%; 60–70%; Rossi: 40–50%; 50–60%; 60–70%

Congressional district results Gregoire: 40–50%; 50–60%; 70–80%; Rossi: 40–50%; 50–60%; 60–70%

Nonpartisan blanket primary results (Note: All party affiliations are given as "Prefers x Party". Independents were listed as "States No Party Preference". Rossi's official preference was "Prefers G.O.P. Party".)
| Party | Candidate | Votes | % |
|---|---|---|---|
| Democratic | Christine Gregoire | 696,306 | 48.27% |
| Republican | Dino Rossi | 668,571 | 46.35% |
| Republican | John W. Aiken Jr. | 21,564 | 1.49% |
| Democratic | Christian Pierre Joubert | 16,646 | 1.15% |
| Independent | James White | 10,884 | 0.75% |
| Green | Duff Badgley | 9,702 | 0.67% |
| Independent | Christopher A. Tudor | 5,600 | 0.39% |
| Reform | Will Baker | 5,201 | 0.36% |
| Republican | Javier O. Lopez | 4,981 | 0.35% |
| Independent | Mohammad Hasan Said | 3,002 | 0.21% |
| Total votes | | 1,442,457 | 100.00% |

==== By congressional district ====
| District | Gregoire | Rossi | Representative |
|---|---|---|---|
| 1st | 52% | 43% | Jay Inslee |
| 2nd | 48% | 47% | Rick Larsen |
| 3rd | 46% | 48% | Brian Baird |
| 4th | 31% | 64% | Doc Hastings |
| 5th | 42% | 51% | Cathy McMorris Rodgers |
| 6th | 50% | 45% | Norm Dicks |
| 7th | 75% | 20% | Jim McDermott |
| 8th | 46% | 50% | Dave Reichert |
| 9th | 49% | 46% | Adam Smith |

== General election ==
Christine Gregoire and Dino Rossi were declared the winners of the primary and placed on the ballot for the November 4 election, which coincided with the national election. However, with all Washington counties either exclusively or (in the case of Pierce and King counties) predominantly voting via mail-in ballot, many votes were cast prior to that date. King County, the largest county in the state, and the one which carried Gregoire to victory in 2004, sent out overseas absentee ballots on October 5, and resident mail-in ballots on October 17.

In Washington state, mail-in ballots only needed to be postmarked, not received, by November 4, meaning that valid ballots continued to be received and counted after that date. For the 2008 election, counties had until November 26 to send results to the state, and the Secretary of State had until December 4 to certify all state results.

=== Predictions ===
| Source | Ranking | As of |
|---|---|---|
| The Cook Political Report | Tossup | October 16, 2008 |
| Rothenberg Political Report | Tossup | November 2, 2008 |
| Sabato's Crystal Ball | Lean D | November 3, 2008 |
| Real Clear Politics | Tossup | November 4, 2008 |

=== Endorsements ===
Dino Rossi (R)

Newspapers

- The Seattle Times

=== Polling ===
Aggregate polls

| Source of poll aggregation | Dates administered | Dates updated | Christine Gregoire (D) | Dino Rossi (R) | Other/Undecided (Note: Calculated by taking the difference of 100% and all other candidates combined.) | Margin |
|---|---|---|---|---|---|---|
| Real Clear Politics | October 22 – November 2, 2008 | November 2, 2008 | 50.7% | 47.3% | 2.0% | Gregoire +3.4% |

View source data.

| Poll source | Date(s) administered | Sample size | Margin of error | Christine Gregoire (D) | Dino Rossi (R) | Undecided |
|---|---|---|---|---|---|---|
| Survey USA | October 30-November 2, 2008 | – | – | 52% | 46% | 2% |
| Survey USA | October 26–27, 2008 | – | – | 50% | 48% | 2% |
| Rasmussen Reports | October 22, 2008 | – | – | 50% | 48% | 2% |
| Survey USA | October 12–13, 2008 | – | – | 48% | 47% | 5% |
| Rasmussen Reports | October 2, 2008 | – | – | 48% | 48% | 4% |
| Survey USA | September 21–22, 2008 | – | – | 50% | 48% | 2% |
| Strategic Vision | September 14–16, 2008 | 800 | ± 3.0% | 46% | 48% | 6% |
| Rasmussen Reports | September 10, 2008 | – | – | 46% | 52% | 2% |
| Survey USA | September 5–7, 2008 | – | – | 47% | 48% | 5% |
| SurveyUSA | August 11–12, 2008 | 718 | ± 3.7% | 50% | 48% | 2% |
| Rasmussen Reports | August 6, 2008 | – | – | 47% | 43% | 10% |
| Strategic Vision | July 25–27, 2008 | 800 | ± 3.0% | 47% | 45% | 8% |
| SurveyUSA | July 13–15, 2008 | 666 | ± 3.9% | 49% | 46% | 5% |
| Moore Information | July 9–10, 2008 | 400 | ± 5.0% | 45% | 45% | 11% |
| Rasmussen Reports | July 9, 2008 | – | – | 49% | 43% | 8% |
| Elway Poll | June 18–22, 2008 | 405 | ± 5.0% | 47% | 39% | 14% |
| Rasmussen Reports | June 9, 2008 | – | – | 50% | 43% | 7% |
| SurveyUSA | June 9, 2008 | 637 | ± 4.0% | 50% | 47% | 3% |
| Rasmussen Reports | May 12, 2008 | – | – | 52% | 41% | 7% |
| Elway Poll | April 21–22, 2008 | 405 | ± 5.0% | 43% | 38% | 19% |
| SurveyUSA | April 14–16, 2008 | 634 | ± 4.0% | 50% | 46% | 4% |
| SurveyUSA | April 7, 2008 | 607 | ± 4.1% | 48% | 47% | 5% |
| Rasmussen Reports | March 27, 2008 | – | – | 47% | 46% | 7% |
| Rasmussen Reports | February 28, 2008 | – | – | 46% | 47% | 7% |
| Washington Poll | February 7–18, 2008 | 300 | ± 5.6% | 54% | 42% | 4% |
| Elway Poll | January 3–6, 2008 | 405 | – | 48% | 35% | 17% |
| Washington Poll | October 22–29, 2007 | 601 | ± 4.0% | 47% | 42% | 11% |
| Strategic Vision | October 5–7, 2007 | 800 | ± 3.0% | 47% | 45% | 8% |
| Strategic Vision | March 24–26, 2006 | 800 | ± 3.0% | 38% | 51% | 11% |

=== Police Guild press conference incident ===
At an August 7 press conference held by the Seattle Police Officers Guild to declare its endorsement of Rossi, the Guild forcibly removed Kelly Akers, a Gregoire campaign staffer who was filming the event, from the premises. The Rossi campaign reiterated a standing policy to prevent opposing campaigns from filming Rossi's appearances, to deny them the ability to take "attack footage." Rossi's campaign staff includes a cameraman tasked with filming Gregoire appearances.

=== Debates ===
Five debates were held between Gregoire and Rossi, the candidates in the general election.

| Date | Time | Location | Sponsors |
|---|---|---|---|
| 2008-09-20 | 9:00 PM | Fisher Plaza (Seattle) | Fisher Communications, League of Women Voters, Seattle Post-Intelligencer |
| 2008-09-25 | 7:30 PM | Semiahmoo Resort (Blaine) | Association of Washington Business Complete video of debate - C-SPAN |
| 2008-10-01 | 7:00 PM | Capitol Theatre (Yakima) | KCTS 9, Yakima Herald-Republic |
| 2008-10-09 | 7:00 PM^{*} | KSPS-TV Studios (Spokane) | KSPS-TV, Spokane Spokesman-Review |
| 2008-10-15 | 8:00 PM | TBD | KING-TV, Seattle Times, NPR |

^{*}The Spokane debate was taped in the morning to be aired at the indicated time. All other debates were held and aired live.

The Gregoire campaign had sought a sixth debate in Tacoma, sponsored by the Tacoma News-Tribune. The Rossi campaign instead sought a sixth debate in Vancouver, Washington, sponsored by The Columbian. The local Camas-Washougal Rotary Club went so far as to reserve a venue for October 8. The campaigns could not agree on either event.

The Gregoire campaign had set aside August 15 for a pre-primary radio debate with Rossi on Seattle NPR station KUOW-FM. Rossi declined to appear, giving Gregoire solo airtime.

=== Results ===
Gregoire declared victory after late evening returns were posted, with 42% of the statewide vote counted, showing her with a 52% lead over Rossi. By 10:30 PM PST (1:30 AM EST) all five major television networks had called the race for Gregoire. The Rossi campaign called the networks' declarations "premature" and did not concede defeat that evening. Rossi held out hope that late ballots would carry him, as late returns had reversed an early Gregoire lead in 2004. Rossi conceded the next morning.

Rossi conceded defeat in the gubernatorial election on November 5. In his concession speech, he indicated that he was not planning a return to politics. Rossi's retirement from politics was short-lived: in 2010 he ran in (and lost) the race for United States Senate against Patty Murray.

2008 Washington gubernatorial election
| Party | Candidate | Votes | % | ±% |
|---|---|---|---|---|
| Democratic | Christine Gregoire (incumbent) | 1,598,738 | 53.24% | +4.37% |
| Republican | Dino Rossi | 1,404,124 | 46.76% | −2.11% |
| Total votes | | 3,002,862 | 100.00% | N/A |
| Democratic hold | | | | |

==== By county ====
| County | Christine Gregoire Democratic | | Dino Rossi Republican | | Margin | | Total votes cast |
| County | # | % | # | % | # | % | Total votes cast |
|---|---|---|---|---|---|---|---|
| Adams | 1,453 | 30.17% | 3,363 | 69.83% | -1,910 | -39.66% | 4,816 |
| Asotin | 4,254 | 43.92% | 5,432 | 56.08% | -1,178 | -12.16% | 9,686 |
| Benton | 21,968 | 30.26% | 50,635 | 69.74% | -28,667 | -39.48% | 72,603 |
| Chelan | 12,087 | 37.99% | 19,730 | 62.01% | -7,643 | -24.02% | 31,817 |
| Clallam | 18,987 | 49.42% | 19,431 | 50.58% | -444 | -1.16% | 38,418 |
| Clark | 87,683 | 48.99% | 91,301 | 51.01% | -3,618 | -2.02% | 178,984 |
| Columbia | 706 | 31.48% | 1,537 | 68.52% | -831 | -37.05% | 2,243 |
| Cowlitz | 20,723 | 46.38% | 23,954 | 53.62% | -3,231 | -7.23% | 44,677 |
| Douglas | 5,128 | 33.87% | 10,013 | 66.13% | -4,885 | -32.26% | 15,141 |
| Ferry | 1,330 | 38.33% | 2,140 | 61.67% | -810 | -23.34% | 3,470 |
| Franklin | 6,365 | 32.41% | 13,276 | 67.59% | -6,911 | -35.19% | 19,641 |
| Garfield | 434 | 32.01% | 922 | 67.99% | -488 | -35.99% | 1,356 |
| Grant | 8,732 | 31.94% | 18,604 | 68.06% | -9,872 | -36.11% | 27,336 |
| Grays Harbor | 15,729 | 53.98% | 13,407 | 46.02% | 2,322 | 7.97% | 29,136 |
| Island | 20,891 | 50.24% | 20,688 | 49.76% | 203 | 0.49% | 41,579 |
| Jefferson | 12,588 | 63.61% | 7,200 | 36.39% | 5,388 | 27.23% | 19,788 |
| King | 583,357 | 64.16% | 325,820 | 35.84% | 257,537 | 28.33% | 909,177 |
| Kitsap | 62,478 | 50.74% | 60,656 | 49.26% | 1,822 | 1.48% | 123,134 |
| Kittitas | 6,988 | 39.44% | 10,732 | 60.56% | -3,744 | -21.13% | 17,720 |
| Klickitat | 4,538 | 45.42% | 5,454 | 54.58% | -916 | -9.17% | 9,992 |
| Lewis | 12,283 | 35.47% | 22,347 | 64.53% | -10,064 | -29.06% | 34,630 |
| Lincoln | 2,052 | 34.66% | 3,868 | 65.34% | -1,816 | -30.68% | 5,920 |
| Mason | 13,942 | 49.58% | 14,181 | 50.42% | -239 | -0.85% | 28,123 |
| Okanogan | 6,575 | 39.27% | 10,168 | 60.73% | -3,593 | -21.46% | 16,743 |
| Pacific | 5,695 | 52.28% | 5,198 | 47.72% | 497 | 4.56% | 10,893 |
| Pend Oreille | 2,571 | 39.66% | 3,912 | 60.34% | -1,341 | -20.68% | 6,483 |
| Pierce | 166,562 | 51.10% | 159,363 | 48.90% | 7,199 | 2.21% | 325,925 |
| San Juan | 7,044 | 67.73% | 3,356 | 32.27% | 3,688 | 35.46% | 10,400 |
| Skagit | 27,915 | 50.33% | 27,545 | 49.67% | 370 | 0.67% | 55,460 |
| Skamania | 2,564 | 47.68% | 2,813 | 52.32% | -249 | -4.63% | 5,377 |
| Snohomish | 167,175 | 52.67% | 150,205 | 47.33% | 16,970 | 5.35% | 317,380 |
| Spokane | 104,369 | 48.11% | 112,570 | 51.89% | -8,201 | -3.78% | 216,939 |
| Stevens | 7,771 | 35.02% | 14,418 | 64.98% | -6,647 | -29.96% | 22,189 |
| Thurston | 72,652 | 57.88% | 52,880 | 42.12% | 19,772 | 15.75% | 125,532 |
| Wahkiakum | 960 | 41.92% | 1,330 | 58.08% | -370 | -16.16% | 2,290 |
| Walla Walla | 9,405 | 38.32% | 15,137 | 61.68% | -5,732 | -23.36% | 24,542 |
| Whatcom | 54,249 | 54.67% | 44,975 | 45.33% | 9,274 | 9.35% | 99,224 |
| Whitman | 8,363 | 48.46% | 8,896 | 51.54% | -533 | -3.09% | 17,259 |
| Yakima | 30,172 | 39.27% | 46,667 | 60.73% | -16,495 | -21.47% | 76,839 |
| Totals | 1,598,738 | 53.24% | 1,404,124 | 46.76% | 194,614 | 6.48% | 3,002,862 |

Counties that flipped from Democratic to Republican

- Cowlitz (largest city: Longview)

Counties that flipped from Republican to Democratic

- Island (largest city: Oak Harbor)
- Kitsap (largest city: Bremerton)
- Pierce (largest city: Tacoma)
- Skagit (largest city: Mount Vernon)
- Snohomish (largest city: Everett)

==== By congressional district ====
Gregoire won five of nine congressional districts, with the remaining four going to Rossi, including one that elected a Democrat.

| District | Gregoire | Rossi | Representative |
|---|---|---|---|
| 1st | 56% | 44% | Jay Inslee |
| 2nd | 52% | 48% | Rick Larsen |
| 3rd | 49.6% | 50.4% | Brian Baird |
| 4th | 35% | 65% | Doc Hastings |
| 5th | 45% | 55% | Cathy McMorris Rodgers |
| 6th | 54% | 46% | Norm Dicks |
| 7th | 79% | 21% | Jim McDermott |
| 8th | 49% | 51% | Dave Reichert |
| 9th | 54% | 46% | Adam Smith |
