= Andy Hill (politician) =

American politician

Member of the Washington Senate from the 45th district
- In office January 10, 2011 – October 31, 2016
- Preceded by: Eric Oemig
- Succeeded by: Dino Rossi

Personal details
- Born: Andrew Richardson Hill; October 12, 1962 Denver, Colorado, U.S.
- Died: October 31, 2016 (aged 54) Redmond, Washington, U.S.
- Party: Republican
- Spouse: Molly Hill
- Children: 3
- Education: Colgate University (BS); Harvard University (MBA)

Andrew Richardson Hill (October 12, 1962 – October 31, 2016) was an American politician, businessman, and engineer. A Republican, he represented District 45 since 2011 in the Washington State Senate, defeating incumbent Democrat Eric Oemig 51%-49% in 2010.

In 2014, he was re-elected, defeating challenger Matt Isenhower by 53%-47%. He was a graduate of Colgate University where he played soccer for four years. After graduating Colgate University, Hill went on to earn an MBA from Harvard Business School in 1990. Before seeking public office, he served as president of the Emily Dickinson Elementary School PTA, and as president of the Lake Washington Youth Soccer Association.

After a recurrence of lung cancer in June 2016, Hill died on October 31, 2016, survived by his wife, Molly, and their three children.

In 2018, Washington State Senate Bill 5375 renamed the cancer research endowment in his name
