= Dino Rossi =

American politician

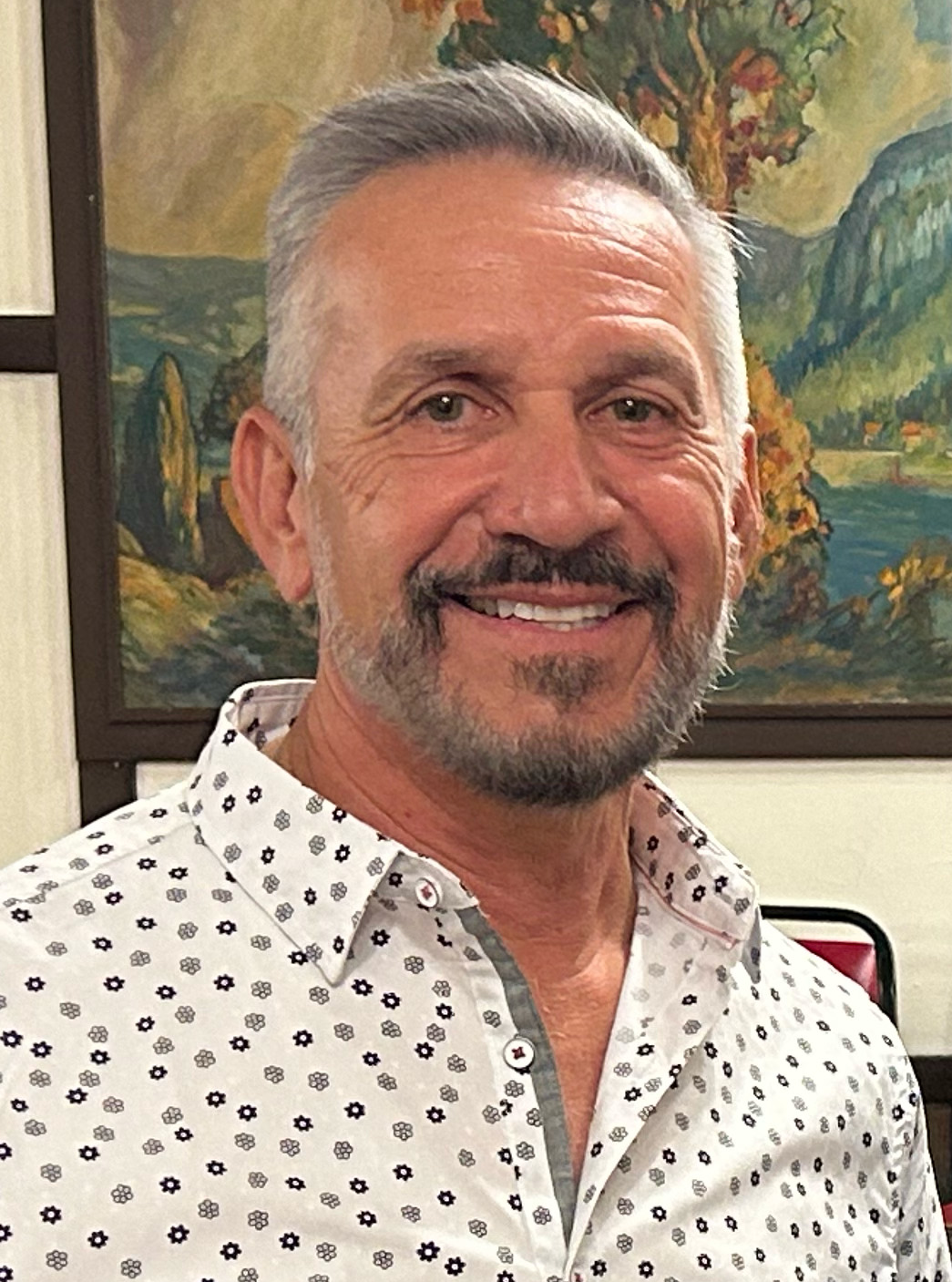
- Rossi in 2024

Member of the Washington State Senate
- In office December 5, 2016 – November 29, 2017
- Preceded by: Andy Hill
- Succeeded by: Manka Dhingra
- Constituency: 45th district
- In office July 10, 2012 – November 30, 2012
- Preceded by: Cheryl Pflug
- Succeeded by: Mark Mullet
- Constituency: 5th district
- In office January 13, 1997 – December 4, 2003
- Preceded by: Kathleen Drew
- Succeeded by: Cheryl Pflug
- Constituency: 5th district

Personal details
- Born: Dino John Rossi; October 15, 1959 (age 67) Seattle, Washington, U.S.
- Citizenship: Tlingit; American
- Party: Republican
- Spouse: Terry Rossi
- Children: 4
- Education: Seattle University (BA)

Dino John Rossi (born October 15, 1959) is an American businessman and politician who served as a Washington state senator thrice, from 1997 to 2003, in 2012, and again from 2016 to 2017. A Republican, he is a former chair of the Washington State Special Olympics.

Originally from Seattle, Rossi graduated from Seattle University and later pursued a career in commercial real estate. He ran for Governor of Washington in 2004, losing to Democrat Christine Gregoire by just 129 votes in the closest gubernatorial election in Washington state history. Four years later, in 2008, he contested the office a second time, losing to Gregoire by more than six points. He was the Republican nominee for the United States Senate in 2010, losing to incumbent Democrat Patty Murray by 4.72%.

Rossi returned to the Washington State Senate, being appointed in 2012 and again from 2016 to 2017. He was the runner-up for the United States House of Representatives for the eighth congressional district in 2018, losing to Democrat Kim Schrier by 4.8%.

== Early life, education, and early career ==
Rossi was the youngest of seven children brought up by his mother Eve, a beautician of Irish and Tlingit ancestry, and his father John Rossi, an Italian-American Seattle Public Schools teacher at Viewlands Elementary in North Seattle. Rossi was raised in Mountlake Terrace, graduated from Woodway High School in Edmonds, and earned a bachelor's degree in business management from Seattle University in 1982.

After college, Rossi began in the commercial real estate business, working for Melvin G. Heide at Capretto & Clark. Rossi followed Heide to two more firms as Heide was being investigated for fraud and false statements; Heide later pleaded guilty. Rossi later became a commercial real estate salesman, managing and owning real estate. Rossi was formerly an owner of the Everett Aquasox minor league baseball team. He is co-founder of the Bellevue, Washington-based Eastside Commercial Bank.

== Political career ==
=== Washington State Senate ===
In 1992, Rossi ran for a Washington State Senate seat in a district representing suburbs east of Seattle, in the Cascade foothills. After winning a divisive Republican Party primary, he lost the general election. In 1996, Rossi ran again for the state senate and was elected.

Rossi served in the Washington State Senate from 1997 until December 2003, when he resigned to spend full-time running for the governorship. During his time as a senator, he gained a reputation for being a political consensus builder.

When the Senate Republicans gained the majority in 2002, Rossi became chair of the Senate Ways and Means Committee that writes the state's two year operating budget. As Ways and Means chairman, Rossi helped to carry out Democratic governor Gary Locke's plans to close a $2.7 billion budget deficit. The budget chief for Democratic governor Gary Locke said of Rossi in 2003, "The really good legislators move from one side to the other really effortlessly, and I think Dino did that." The Republican modifications to Locke's budget plan which Rossi oversaw included reaching a balanced budget by cutting the number of children eligible for Medicaid, cutting prenatal care for undocumented immigrants, cutting raises for state employees and increased tuition at colleges and universities. Said former governor Locke, “For years, I have simply laughed when Dino Rossi took credit for devising a no-tax-increase budget for the 2003-2005 cycle while protecting vulnerable populations."

In 1998, he co-sponsored the Mary Johnsen Act, to require ignition interlock devices for certain convicted drunk drivers in the state of Washington. He also sponsored the Dane Rempfer bill which boosted penalties for those who left the scene of a fatal accident, named after a 15-year-old boy from his district who was killed in a hit-and-run.

=== 2004 gubernatorial campaign ===
Rossi decided to run in November 2003, but was already facing an uphill battle in terms of money raised, low name identification with voters and trends established by the two prior GOP candidates for governor. The sitting Washington State Attorney General and Rossi's eventual opponent in the general election, Democrat Christine Gregoire, had already raised $1.15 million by December, only weeks after Rossi officially kicked off his campaign. Furthermore, the previous two GOP candidates for governor had lost their campaign bids by 16% and 18.7% in 1996 and 2000.

In the November 2 election, over 2.8 million votes were cast for governor. After the initial vote count, Rossi led Gregoire by 261 votes.

Washington State law required a recount because of the small margin. After the second count, Rossi again led, but by a smaller margin of 42 votes. After a third count, done by hand, Gregoire took a 129-vote lead (expanded to a 133-vote lead after a court decision threw out four votes for Rossi).

King County's election department was sued by the Rossi campaign for its handling of ballots, including untracked use of a "ballot-on-demand" printing machine. Even before the election date, the U.S. Department of Justice threatened to sue Washington State for failing to mail military ballots overseas, generally assumed to be Republican votes.

Republican leaders in Washington claimed there were enough disputed votes to change the outcome of the election and sued. On May 25, 2005, the judge hearing the lawsuit ruled that the Party did not provide enough evidence that the disputed votes were ineligible, or for whom they were cast, to enable the court to overturn the election. Rossi did not appeal to the state Supreme Court.

The election is notable as the closest gubernatorial race in the history of the United States and was the subject of the Trova Heffernan book An Election for the Ages.

=== 2004 to 2008 ===
After the election and the ensuing court battle, Rossi returned to his work in real estate and wrote a book, Dino Rossi: Lessons in Leadership, Business, Politics and Life. Along with former Seattle Mariner baseball star Jay Buhner, he also purchased a minority share in the Seattle Mariners' single A minor league baseball team, the Everett Aquasox. Rossi also established Forward Washington Foundation, a 501(c)(4) non-profit lobbying entity dedicated to promoting changes to Washington's small business climate.

In 2007, the Washington State Democratic Party filed a complaint with the Washington Public Disclosure Committee (PDC) asserting that the Forward Washington Foundation was too similar to a campaign to be exempt from campaign finance laws. Prior to her party's formal complaint, Gregoire stated to donors that she was "campaigning aggressively". The PDC dismissed in totality the allegations made by the Washington State Democrats, deeming each accusatory claim as "insufficient" and stating that the organization was indeed acting consistent with its mission statement, making it "a social welfare organization (...) and not a political committee".

=== 2008 gubernatorial campaign ===
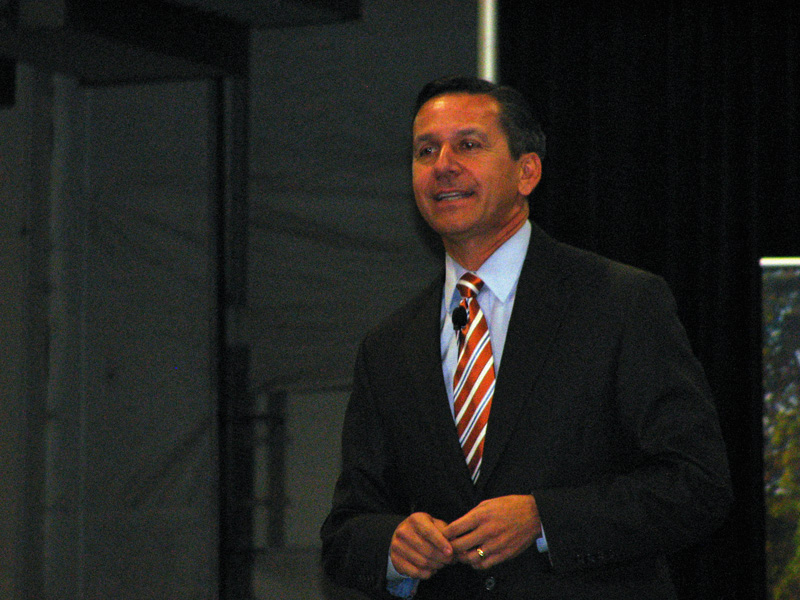
Rossi campaigning in Pasco, Washington in 2008

On October 25, 2007, Dino Rossi announced his intention to seek the office of Governor of Washington in 2008. Rossi's campaign was centered on many of the same issues he ran under in the 2004 election, namely controlling the spending of the state's legislature, tax cuts, and improving the business environment within the state. He was endorsed by The Seattle Times.

On October 7, a lawsuit was filed against the Building Industry Association of Washington (BIAW), for allegedly coordinating fundraising activities with Rossi in violation of Washington's public finance laws. Rossi's campaign spokeswoman dismissed the suit as a desperate attempt by Gregoire's supporters to win an election through frivolous legal maneuvering, a claim that was denied by the lawyer that filed the suit. In 2010 the lawsuit was dismissed "with prejudice".

Dino Rossi was defeated by Governor Christine Gregoire in the 2008 election and formally conceded at noon on November 5, 2008. Her margin of victory was 53% to 47%.

=== 2008 to 2010 ===
Following his defeat in the 2008 gubernatorial election, Rossi "unplugged from almost everything political" and became a principal at Coast Equity Partners, a commercial real estate firm in Everett, Washington. Rossi's role at the firm was to find investors for income producing properties in Washington and four other Western U.S. states.

=== 2010 U.S. Senate campaign ===
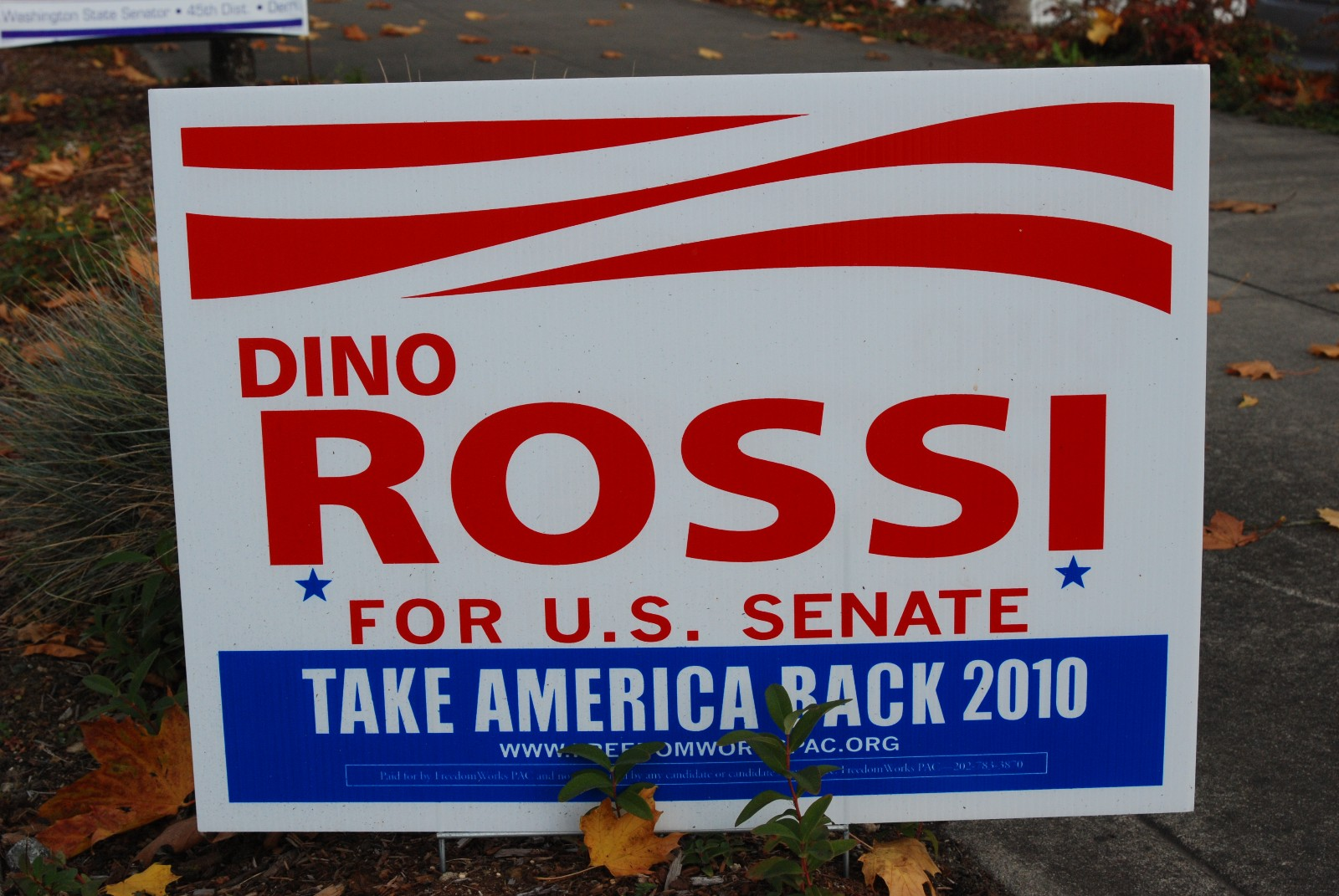
Rossi campaign sign

In early 2010, Washington State Republicans began courting various conservatives to challenge incumbent senator Patty Murray in a year that was seen by many as a vulnerable year for Democratic candidates. On May 26, 2010, Dino Rossi officially announced his candidacy for the U.S. Senate. In the blanket primary, Rossi defeated Tea Party favorite Clint Didier 34% to 12%. Rossi went on to lose the general Election on November 4, after two days' worth of ballot counting indicated that he would not have enough votes to defeat Sen. Murray. In the final tally Murray received 1,314,930 votes (52.4%) to Rossi's 1,196,164 (47.6%).

=== 2012 and 2016 appointments to the State Senate ===
On July 10, 2012, Rossi was appointed to fill the term of Senator Cheryl Pflug. Rossi left office in November 2012, when Mark Mullet was sworn in.

After 2012 redistricting and the 2016 death of State Senator Andy Hill, Dino Rossi was appointed to the 45th District State Senate seat. The Republican Party chose him over Kirkland City Councilman Toby Nixon and Joel Hussey from the King County Council. Democrat Manka Dhingra defeated Republican Jinyoung Englund to take the seat in the November 7, 2017 special election.

=== 2018 U.S. House campaign ===
On September 19, 2017, Rossi announced that he would run for the U.S. House of Representatives in the 8th Congressional District. The seat was held by Dave Reichert, who had decided not to run for reelection. Rossi advanced out of the top-two primary to face Democrat Kim Schrier in the general election, which he lost, getting 47.6%.

== Personal life ==
Rossi is married, with four children, and lives in Sammamish, Washington. He identifies as a faithful Catholic.

== Electoral history ==
September 1992 State Senator District #5 Primary
Party	Candidate	Votes	%
Democratic	Kathleen Drew	8,598	36.21
Republican	Dino Rossi	6,563	24.64
Republican	Dick Welsh	3,215	13.54
Republican	Bob Brady	2,788	11.74
Republican	Gwenn Escher	2,581	10.87

November 1992 State Senator District #5 General election
Party	Candidate	Votes	%
Democratic	Kathleen Drew	26,042	52.10
Republican	Dino Rossi	23,942	47.90

September 1996 State Senator District #5 Primary
Party	Candidate	Votes	%
Democratic	Kathleen Drew	10,331	40.16
Republican	Dino J. Rossi	8,291	32.33
Republican	Dave Irons	7,100	27.60

November 1996 State Senator District #5 General election
Party	Candidate	Votes	%
Republican	Dino Rossi	28,286	53.20
Democratic	Kathleen Drew	24,882	46.80

September 2000 State Senator District #5 Primary
Party	Candidate	Votes	%
Republican	Dino Rossi	20,318	77.93
Democratic	Azziem Hassan Underwood	5,754	22.07

November 2000 State Senator District #5 General
Party	Candidate	Votes	%
Republican	Dino Rossi	40,460	69.58
Democratic	Azziem Hassan Underwood	17,686	30.42

2004 Washington state gubernatorial election
Party	Candidate	Votes	%
Democratic	Christine Gregoire	1,373,361	48.8730
Republican	Dino Rossi	1,373,232	48.8717

2008 Washington state gubernatorial election
Party	Candidate	Votes	%
Democratic	Christine Gregoire	1,598,738	53.24
Republican	Dino Rossi	1,404,124	46.76

2010 U.S. Senate Primary
Party	Candidate	Votes	%
Democratic	Patty Murray (Incumbent)	670,284	46.22
Republican	Dino Rossi	483,305	33.33
Republican	Clint Didier	185,034	12.76
Republican	Paul Akers	37,231	2.57
N/A	Others	74,272	5.12

2010 U.S. Senate General election
Party	Candidate	Votes	%
Democratic	Patty Murray	1,314,930	52.36
Republican	Dino Rossi	1,196,164	47.64

Nonpartisan blanket primary results, 2018
Party	Candidate	Votes	%
Republican	Dino Rossi (Note: Listed on ballot as "GOP Party.")	73,288	43.1
Democratic	Kim Schrier	31,837	18.7
Democratic	Jason Rittereiser	30,708	18.1
Democratic	Shannon Hader	21,317	12.5
Republican	Jack Hughes-Hageman	4,270	2.5
Republican	Gordon Allen Pross	2,081	1.2
Democratic	Tom Cramer	1,468	0.9
Independent	Bill Grassie (Note: Listed on ballot as "Independent Centrist.")	1,163	0.7
Libertarian	Richard Travis Reyes	1,154	0.7
Independent	Keith Arnold	1,090	0.6
Independent	Patrick Dillon (Note: Listed on ballot as "Neither Major Party.")	898	0.5
No party preference	Todd Mahaffey	673	0.4
Total votes		169,947	100.0

2018 Congressional District 8 - U.S. Representative
Party	Candidate	Votes	%
Democratic	Kim Schrier	164,089	52.42
Republican	Dino Rossi	148,968	47.58

== Notes ==
Washington State Senate
Preceded by Kathleen Drew	Member of the Washington Senate from the 5th district 1997–2003	Succeeded by Cheryl Pflug
Preceded by Cheryl Pflug	Member of the Washington Senate from the 5th district 2012	Succeeded by Mark Mullet
Party political offices
Preceded by John Carlson	Republican nominee for Governor of Washington; 2004, 2008	Succeeded by Rob McKenna
Preceded by George Nethercutt	Republican nominee for U.S. Senator from Washington (Class 3); 2010	Succeeded by Chris Vance
