= Washington's 45th legislative district =

Coordinates: 47.70°N 122.09°W

Map of Washington's 45th legislative district

Washington's 45th legislative district is one of 49 electoral districts in Washington state for representation in the state legislature. It extends from Kirkland on the west, Duvall on the east, and Sammamish on the south.

The district's legislators are state senator Manka Dhingra and state representatives Roger Goodman (position 1) and Larry Springer (position 2), all Democrats.

On November 7, 2017, there was a special election to fill the district's state senate seat. Independent Parker Harris was eliminated in the top-two primary, and then Democrat Manka Dhingra defeated Republican Jinyoung Englund by 11 points. The victory gave control of the Washington State Senate to the Democrats.

== See also ==
- Washington Redistricting Commission
- Washington State Legislature
- Washington State Senate
- Washington House of Representatives
