= Washington's 5th legislative district =

American legislative district

Coordinates: 47.4964°N 122.0221°W

Washington 5th legislative district map

Washington's 5th legislative district is one of forty-nine districts in Washington state for representation in the state legislature. The district borders Kittitas County on the east, the 31st legislative district on the south, parts of Maple Valley, Renton, and Issaquah on the west, and Sammamish on the north.

The largely rural district is represented by state senator Victoria Hunt and is represented by state representatives Zach Hall (position 1) and Lisa Callan (position 2), all Democrats.

== Past legislators ==
=== Statehood-1932 ===
During this period, the state senate and state house districts were geographically distinct.

Year	Senate		House		
Year	Senator	Senate District Geography	House Position 1	House Position 2	House District Geography
1st (1889-1890)	A. T. Fariss (R) (Note: This district was represented by three senators simultaneously from 1889-1890.)	Whitman County			
1st (1889-1890)	John C. Lawrence (R)	Whitman County			
1st (1889-1890)	John T. Whalley (R)	Whitman County			
2nd (1891-1892)	Alexander Watt (R)	Spokane County (part)	House District Established		Spokane County (part)
2nd (1891-1892)	Alexander Watt (R)	Spokane County (part)	George Fellows (R)	Louis Walter (D)	Spokane County (part)
3rd (1893-1894)	W. C. Belknap (R)	Spokane County (part)	R. D. Speck (R)	C. F. Westfall (R)	Spokane County (part)
4th (1895-1896)	W. C. Belknap (R)	Spokane County (part)	W. E. Runner (P.P.)	R. K. Kegley (P.P.)	Spokane County (part)
5th (1897-1898)	W. E. Runner (Pop.), (P.P.) (Note: Changed party affiliation from Populist Party to People's Party in 1899)	Spokane County (part)	C. E. Mohundro (Pop.)	Lewis Lindstrom (Pop.)	Spokane County (part)
6th (1899-1900)	W. E. Runner (Pop.), (P.P.)	Spokane County (part)	F. P. Witter (R)	A. Harrison (R)	Spokane County (part)
7th (1901-1902)	Stanley Hallett (D)	Spokane County (part)	C. W. Bowne (D)	James Puckett (D)	Spokane County (part)
8th (1903-1904)	Stanley Hallett (D)	Spokane County (part)	A. J. Reise (D)	John Gray (D)	Spokane County (part)
9th (1905-1906)	E. C. Bratt (R)	Spokane County (part)	George T. Crane (R)	N. E. Linsley (R)	Spokane County (part)
10th (1907-1908)	E. C. Bratt (R)	Spokane County (part)	Emery P. Gilbert (R)	D. M. Thompson (R)	Spokane County (part)
11th (1909-1910)	Ellsworth C. Whitney (R)	Spokane County (part)	Norman Buck (R) (Note: Deceased Aug. 20, 1909)	Lester P. Edge (D)	Spokane County (part)
11th (1909-1910)	Ellsworth C. Whitney (R)	Spokane County (part)	Vacant (Note: Seat was vacant until after the 1910 general election. The legislature concluded their 1909 Ex. Session one day after the seat was vacated and did not meet afterwards.)	Lester P. Edge (D)	Spokane County (part)
12th (1911-1912)	Ellsworth C. Whitney (R)	Spokane County (part)	Guy B. Groff (R)	Lloyd E. Gandy (R)	Spokane County (part)
13th (1913-1914)	W. J. Sutton (R)	Spokane County (part)	Hance Cleland (R)	John Gray (D)	Spokane County (part)
14th (1915-1916)	W. J. Sutton (R)	Spokane County (part)	L. Frank Boyd (R)	Maurice Smith (R)	Spokane County (part)
15th (1917-1918)	E. Ben Johnson (R)	Spokane County (part)	Maurice Smith (R) (Note: Resigned 1920, Elected Feb. 1920 Spokane City Commissioner)	L. Frank Boyd (R)	Spokane County (part)
16th (1919-1920)	E. Ben Johnson (R)	Spokane County (part)	Maurice Smith (R)	John D. Bassett (R)	Spokane County (part)
16th (1919-1920)	E. Ben Johnson (R)	Spokane County (part)	Cyrus Happy Jr. (R) (Note: Elected Mar. 17, 1920 to serve 1920 Ex. Session)	John D. Bassett (R)	Spokane County (part)
17th (1921-1922)	W. J. Sutton (R)	Spokane County (part)	John D. Bassett (R)	Floyd B. Danskin (R)	Spokane County (part)
18th (1923-1924)	W. J. Sutton (R)	Spokane County (part)	John D. Bassett (R)	Floyd B. Danskin (R)	Spokane County (part)
19th (1925-1926)	W. J. Sutton (R)	Spokane County (part)	Floyd B. Danskin (R) (Note: Elected Speaker of the House for the 19th legislative session (1925-26))	W. W. Zent (R)	Spokane County (part)
20th (1927-1928)	W. J. Sutton (R)	Spokane County (part)	Floyd B. Danskin (R)	Lester P. Edge (R)	Spokane County (part)
21st (1929-1930)	W. J. Sutton (R)	Spokane County (part)	Floyd B. Danskin (R)	J. Phillips Post (R)	Spokane County (part)
22nd (1931-1932)	W. J. Sutton (R)	Spokane County (part)	Floyd B. Danskin (R)	John F. Davies (R)	Spokane County (part)

=== 1933-Present ===
After the passage of Initiative 57 and the 1930 redistricting cycle, the state senate and state house districts were geographically similar. While some senate districts would occasionally be broken up into house seats A and B, seats A and B were always contained in the Senate district boundaries.

The 5th Legislative district's state senate and house seats are identical geographically from 1933 to the present day.

Year	Senate	House		District Geography
Year	Senator	House Position 1	House Position 2	District Geography
23rd (1933-1934)	Kebel Murphy (D)	Harry C. Huse (D) (Note: Resigned May 16, 1933)	Charles E. Peterson (R)	Spokane County (part)
23rd (1933-1934)	Kebel Murphy (D)	James Cannon (D) (Note: Appointed to serve 1933 Ex. Session)	Charles E. Peterson (R)	Spokane County (part)
24th (1935-1936)	Kebel Murphy (D)	George H. Johnston (D)	Raymond F. Kelly (D)	Spokane County (part)
25th (1937-1938)	Kebel Murphy (D)	George H. Johnston (D)	Donald B. Miller (D)	Spokane County (part)
26th (1939-1940)	Kebel Murphy (D)	Wylie W. Brown (D)	Donald B. Miller (D)	Spokane County (part)
27th (1941-1942)	Kebel Murphy (D)	Bernard J. Gallagher (D)	George H. Johnston (D)	Spokane County (part)
28th (1943-1944)	Kebel Murphy (D)	George H. Johnston (D)	Donald B. Miller (D) (Note: Resigned Feb. 17, 1944)	Spokane County (part)
28th (1943-1944)	Kebel Murphy (D)	George H. Johnston (D)	Clarence D. Martin (D) (Note: Appointed to 1944 Ex. Session)	Spokane County (part)
29th (1945-1946)	Edwin A. Beck (D)	L. R. Anderson (D)	George H. Johnston (D)	Spokane County (part)
30th (1947-1948)	Edwin A. Beck (D)	James A. Blodgett (R)	Albert F. Canwell (R)	Spokane County (part)
31st (1949-1950)	Donald B. Miller (D)	Russell Hoopingarner (D)	Reuben T. Smiley (D)	Spokane County (part)
32nd (1951-1952)	Donald B. Miller (D)	John L. Cooney (D)	Russell Hoopingarner (D)	Spokane County (part)
33rd (1953-1954)	Lloyd J. Andrews (R)	Thad Byrne (R)	Wilfred A. Gamon (R)	Spokane County (part)
34th (1955-1956)	Lloyd J. Andrews (R)	Thad Byrne (R)	John L. Cooney (D)	Spokane County (part)
35th (1957-1958)	John L. Cooney (D)	Keith H. Campbell (D)	Bill McCormick (D)	Spokane County (part)
36th (1959-1960)	John L. Cooney (D)	Keith H. Campbell (D)	Bill McCormick (D)	Spokane County (part)
37th (1961-1962)	John L. Cooney (D)	Keith H. Campbell (D)	Bill McCormick (D)	Spokane County (part)
38th (1963-1964)	John L. Cooney (D)	Keith H. Campbell (D)	Bill McCormick (D)	Spokane County (part)
39th (1965-1966)	John L. Cooney (D)	Bill McCormick (D) (Note: Deceased Jan. 24, 1968)	Gerald L. Saling (R)	Spokane County (part)
40th (1967-1968)	John L. Cooney (D)	Bill McCormick (D)	Gerald L. Saling (R)	1965 Redistricting
40th (1967-1968)	John L. Cooney (D)	Lester M. Merritt (D) (Note: Appointed Mar. 14, 1968)	Gerald L. Saling (R)	Spokane County (part)
40th (1967-1968)	John L. Cooney (D)	Geraldine McCormick (D) (Note: Elected Nov. 5, 1968 to serve unexpired term)) (Note: Resigned Dec. 31, 1982)	Gerald L. Saling (R)	Spokane County (part)
41st (1969-1970)	John L. Cooney (D)	Geraldine McCormick (D)	Gerald L. Saling (R)	Spokane County (part)
42nd (1971-1972)	John L. Cooney (D)	Geraldine McCormick (D)	Edward T. Luders (D) (Note: Resigned Jan. 25, 1976)	Spokane County (part)
43rd (1973-1974)	Bob Lewis (R)	Geraldine McCormick (D)	Edward T. Luders (D)	1972 Redistricting
43rd (1973-1974)	Bob Lewis (R)	Geraldine McCormick (D)	Edward T. Luders (D)	Spokane County (part)
44th (1975-1976)	Bob Lewis (R)	Geraldine McCormick (D)	Edward T. Luders (D)	Spokane County (part)
44th (1975-1976)	Bob Lewis (R)	Geraldine McCormick (D)	Gladys Morgen (D) (Note: Appointed Mar. 4, 1976)	Spokane County (part)
44th (1975-1976)	Bob Lewis (R)	Geraldine McCormick (D)	Jerry M. Hughes (D) (Note: Elected Nov. 2, 1976 to serve unexpired term)	Spokane County (part)
45th (1977-1978)	Bob Lewis (R)	Geraldine McCormick (D)	Jerry M. Hughes (D)	Spokane County (part)
46th (1979-1980)	Bob Lewis (R)	Geraldine McCormick (D)	Jerry M. Hughes (D)	Spokane County (part)
47th (1981-1982)	Jerry M. Hughes (D)	Geraldine McCormick (D)	Richard H. Barrett (R)	Spokane County (part)
48th (1983-1984)	Jerry M. Hughes (D)	B. Jean Silver (R)	Richard H. Barrett (R)	Spokane County (part)
49th (1985-1986)	Jerry Saling (R)	B. Jean Silver (R)	Richard H. Barrett (R)	Spokane County (part)
50th (1987-1988)	Jerry Saling (R)	B. Jean Silver (R)	Gary Bumgarner (R)	Spokane County (part)
51st (1989-1990)	Jerry Saling (R)	B. Jean Silver (R)	Shirley Rector (D)	Spokane County (part)
52nd (1991-1992)	Jerry Saling (R)	B. Jean Silver (R)	Todd Mielke (R)	Spokane County (part)
53rd (1993-1994)	Kathleen Drew (D)	Philip E. Dyer (R)	Brian Thomas (R)	King County (part)
54th (1995-1996)	Kathleen Drew (D)	Philip E. Dyer (R)	Brian Thomas (R)	King County (part)
55th (1997-1998)	Dino Rossi (R) (Note: Resigned Dec. 12, 2003 to run for Governor)	Philip E. Dyer (R)	Brian Thomas (R)	King County (part)
56th (1999-2000)	Dino Rossi (R)	Cheryl Pflug (R) (Note: Resigned house seat; Appointed Jan. 5, 2004 to the serve unexpired term in the state senate)	Brian Thomas (R)	King County (part)
57th (2001-2002)	Dino Rossi (R)	Cheryl Pflug (R)	Glenn Anderson (R)	King County (part)
58th (2003-2004)	Dino Rossi (R)	Cheryl Pflug (R)	Glenn Anderson (R)	King County (part)
58th (2003-2004)	Cheryl Pflug (R) (Note: Resigned June 30, 2012; Appointed to WA Growth Management Hearings Board)	Jay Rodne (R) (Note: Appointed Jan. 20, 2004 to serve unexpired term)	Glenn Anderson (R)	King County (part)
59th (2005-2006)	Cheryl Pflug (R)	Jay Rodne (R)	Glenn Anderson (R)	King County (part)
60th (2007-2008)	Cheryl Pflug (R)	Jay Rodne (R)	Glenn Anderson (R)	King County (part)
61st (2009-2010)	Cheryl Pflug (R)	Jay Rodne (R)	Glenn Anderson (R)	King County (part)
62nd (2011-2012)	Cheryl Pflug (R)	Jay Rodne (R)	Glenn Anderson (R)	King County (part)
62nd (2011-2012)	Dino Rossi (R) (Note: Appointed July 9, 2012)	Jay Rodne (R)	Glenn Anderson (R)	King County (part)
62nd (2011-2012)	Mark Mullet (D) (Note: Elected Nov. 6, 2012; Sworn in Nov. 30, 2012 to serve unexpired term)	Jay Rodne (R)	Glenn Anderson (R)	King County (part)
63rd (2013-2014)	Mark Mullet (D)	Jay Rodne (R)	Chad Magendanz (R)	King County (part)
64th (2015-2016)	Mark Mullet (D)	Jay Rodne (R)	Chad Magendanz (R)	King County (part)
65th (2017-2018)	Mark Mullet (D)	Jay Rodne (R)	Paul Graves (R)	King County (part)
66th (2019-2020)	Mark Mullet (D)	Bill Ramos (D)	Lisa Callan (D)	King County (part)
67th (2021-2022)	Mark Mullet (D)	Bill Ramos (D)	Lisa Callan (D)	King County (part)
68th (2023-2024)	Mark Mullet (D)	Bill Ramos (D)	Lisa Callan (D)	King County (part)
69th (2025-2026)	Bill Ramos (D) (Note: Deceased Apr. 19, 2025)	Victoria Hunt (D) (Note: Resigned house seat; Appointed June 3, 2025 to the serve unexpired term in the state senate)	Lisa Callan (D)	King County (part)
69th (2025-2026)	Victoria Hunt (D)	Zach Hall (D) (Note: Appointed June 3, 2025 to serve unexpired term)	Lisa Callan (D)	King County (part)

== Key ==
Democratic (D)
Populist (Pop)
Republican (R)

- P.P. is People's Party which was closely associate with the Populist Party.

== See also ==
- Washington Redistricting Commission
- Washington State Legislature
- Washington State Senate
- Washington House of Representatives
- Washington (state) legislative districts
