= Sylvester =

Sylvester or Silvester is a name derived from the Latin adjective silvestris meaning "wooded" or "wild", which derives from the noun silva meaning "woodland". Classical Latin spells this with i. In Classical Latin, y represented a separate sound distinct from i, not a native Latin sound but one used in transcriptions of foreign words. After the Classical period y was pronounced as i. Spellings with Sylv- in place of Silv- date from after the Classical period.

== Given name ==
=== Arts and entertainment ===
==== Music ====
- Silvester Diggles (1817–1880), Australian musician and ornithologist
- Sylvester James Jr. (1947–1988), also known as Sylvester, singer and disco performer
- Sylvester Levay (born 1954), Hungarian musician
- Sylvester Stewart (1943–2025), or Sly Stone, musician and record producer, best known as the frontman for Sly and the Family Stone

==== Other ====
- Silvester Brito (1937–2018), American poet and academic
- Silvester Harding (1745–1809), English artist and publisher
- Sylvester McCoy (born 1943), Scottish actor
- Sylvester Stallone (born 1946), American actor
- Sylvester Terkay (born 1970), American professional wrestler

=== Politics ===
- Sylvester A. Dineen (1898–1950), American schoolteacher and politician
- Silvester Johnson (1813–1889), Kentucky merchant and politician
- Silvester Mirabal (1864–1939), American farmer and politician
- Silvester Sedborough (1515/16–1551), Member of Parliament
- Sylvester Turner (1954–2025), American attorney and politician, mayor of Houston, Texas

=== Religion ===
- Antipope Sylvester IV, a claimant from 1105 to 1111
- Pope Sylvester I (died 335), Saint Sylvester
- Pope Sylvester II (c. 946–1003)
- Pope Sylvester III (died 1062 or 1063)
- Silvester de Everdon (died 1254), bishop and Lord Chancellor
- Sylvester Gozzolini (1177–1267), saint and founder of the Sylvestrines religious order
- Silvester Jenks (1656–1714), English priest and theologian
- Silvester Petra Sancta (1590–1647), Italian priest and herald
- Patriarch Silvester of Alexandria (fl. 1569–1590)
- Sylvester of Assisi (died 1240), companion of Saint Francis of Assisi
- Sylvester of Antioch, 18th century Greek bishop
- Sylvester of Kiev (c. 1055–1123), clergyman and writer in Kievan Rus
- Silvester of Troina (died 1185), Basilian monk
- Silvester of Valdiseve (1278–1348), monk
- Sylvester of Worcester, early 13th century Bishop of Worcester
- Sylvester (priest), 15th-century priest of the Cathedral of the Annunciation and close advisor to Ivan IV
- Sylvester Graham (1794–1851), Presbyterian minister, father of graham crackers
- Silvester Horne (1865–1914), Congregational minister
- Sylvester Espelage (1877-1940), American Catholic bishop in China

=== Sports ===
- Silvester Ashioya (born 1948), Kenyan hockey player
- Sylvester Croom (born 1954), American football coach and former player
- Silvester Fernandes (born 1936), Kenyan hockey player
- Silvester Goraseb (born 1974), Namibian footballer
- Silvester Knipfer (1939–2010), German sports shooter
- Sylvester Mittee (born 1956), Saint Lucian/British boxer
- Silvester Sabolčki (1979–2003), Croatian footballer
- Silvester Šereš (1918–2000), Hungarian-Yugoslav footballer
- Silvester Shkalla (born 1995), Albanian footballer
- Silvester Takač (born 1940), Serbian-Yugoslavian footballer and football manager
- Silvester van der Water (born 1996), Dutch footballer

=== Other fields ===
- Sylvester of Marsico (c. 1100–1162), Count of Marsico in the Kingdom of Sicily
- Silvester Bolam (1905–1953), British newspaper editor
- Silvester Gardiner (1708–1786), American physician, pharmaceutical merchant and land developer

== Surname ==
- Andy Silvester (born 1947), British bassist and multi-instrumentalist
- Attila Silvester (1944–2010), Greek choreographer
- Charles Sylvester (1774–1828), English chemist and inventor
- Dean Sylvester (born 1972), American hockey player
- David Silvester (born 1958), Scottish numerical analyst
- David Sylvester (medievalist), Canadian medieval historian
- Debbie Silvester (born 20th century), British-Australian chemist and professor
- Flor Silvester (1923–2008), Dutch graphic designer, illustrator, painter and sculptor
- Fred Silvester (1933–2025), British politician
- Frederick C. Silvester (1901–1966), British organist and composer
- Hannah Sylvester (1903–1973), American blues singer
- Harold Sylvester (born 1949), American film and television actor
- James Joseph Sylvester (1814–1897), English mathematician
- Jarrod Silvester (born 1965), Australian rules footballer
- Jay Silvester (born 1937), American athlete
- John Silvester (disambiguation)
- Joshua Sylvester (1563–1618), English poet
- Lewis Sylvester (born 1998), English boxer
- Marc Sylvester, American middle-distance runner
- Michael Silvester (born 1998), Irish rugby union player
- Michael Sylvester (politician), American politician and labor organizer
- Michael Sylvester (tenor) (born 1951), American opera-singer
- Mike Sylvester (born 1951), an Italian-American basketball player
- Mist (born 1992 as Rhys Thomas Sylvester), British rapper
- Nigel Sylvester (born 1987), American professional BMX athlete
- Paul J. Silvester (born 1963), American white collar criminal
- Peter Silvester (disambiguation)
- Philip Carteret Silvester (1777–1828), 2nd Baronet
- Rick Sylvester (born 1942), American stuntman
- Robin Sylvester (1950–2022), English musician
- Sherry Sylvester, American political worker and journalist
- Stephen Silvester (born 1951), English cricketer
- Terry Sylvester (born 1947), English musician
- Victor Silvester (1900–1978), English musician and bandleader
- Walter Sylvester (1867–1944), English inventor
- William Sylvester (1922–1995), American TV and film actor
- William Henry Thomas Sylvester (1831–1920), English army officer and surgeon

== Fictional characters ==
- Bear Sylvester, a character on the BBC soap opera Doctors
- Sylvester the Cat, a Looney Tunes character
- Sylvester Jr., a son of Sylvester J. Pussycat, Sr.
- Sylvester, a donkey in the children's book Sylvester and the Magic Pebble
- Sylvester, a main character in the series Trapped in the Closet
- Sylvester Rax, an antagonist in the 1985 animated show M.A.S.K. (TV series)
- Sylvester McMonkey McBean, a character in the Dr. Seuss book The Sneetches and Other Stories
- Sue Sylvester, a main character on the Fox sitcom Glee

== See also ==
- Saint Sylvester's Day
