= Darton (disambiguation) =

Darton may refer to:

- Darton, a large village in South Yorkshire, England, near Barnsley
  - Darton railway station
  - Darton College, Darton
  - Darton Primary School
- Darton (surname)
- Darton State College, Georgia, U.S.

== See also ==
- Darton College (disambiguation)
