= Michelle Clarke-Stables =

British artist

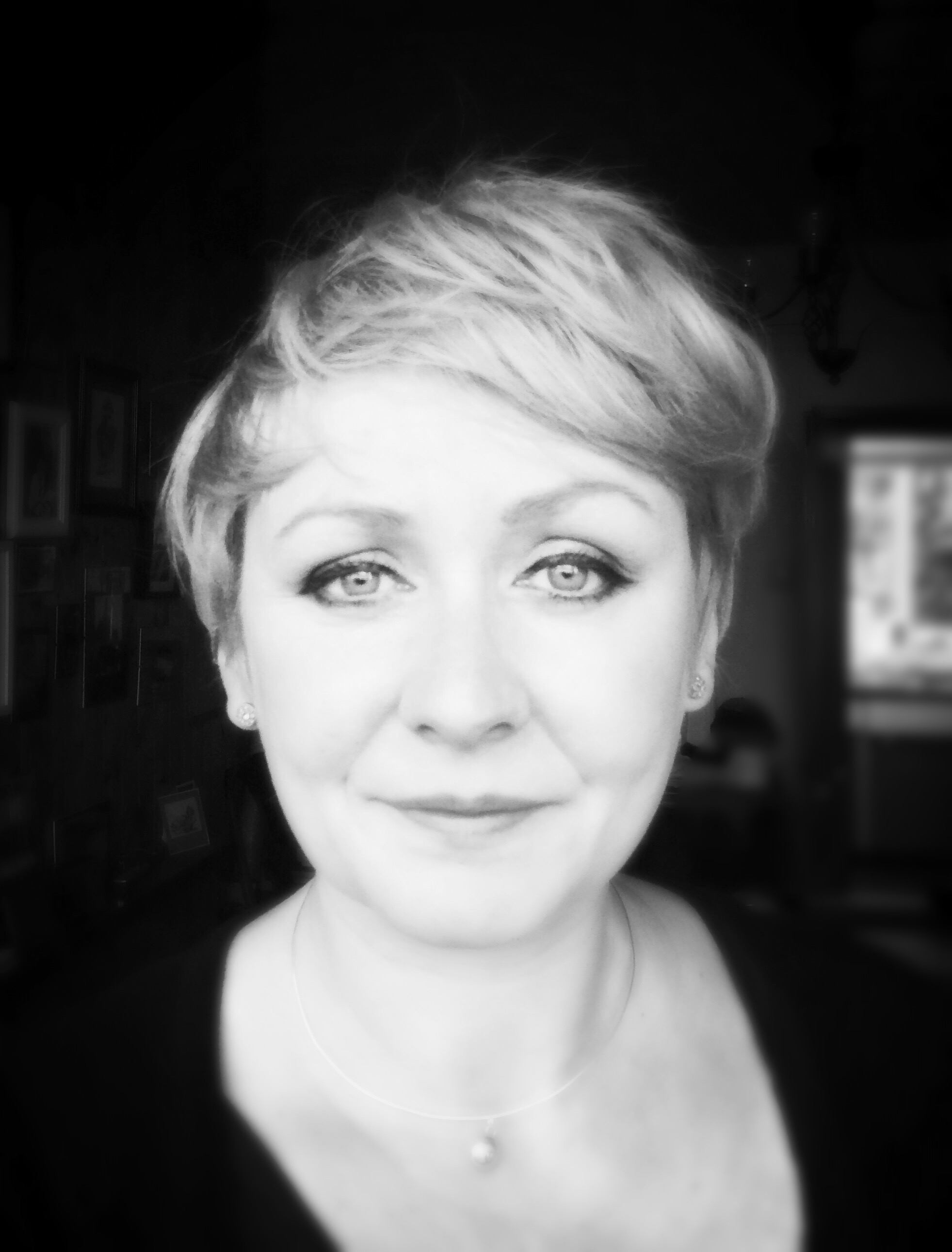
Michelle Clarke-Stables

Michelle Clarke-Stables, also known as McStables, was born in 1977 in Stafford UK. This British artist is best known for colourful, spontaneous portraiture work. She currently lives and works in Yorkshire, England.

In 2013 her project, Snapshots of Familial Gazes, gained support from notable public figures Maya Angelou, Germaine Greer, Judi Dench, and comedian Jo Brand. As part of this project she also painted playwright Githa Sowerby. However, this painting was displayed separately at the York Theatre Royal.

In 2014 Clarke-Stables worked on a number of projects. Whatever They Said, was a portrait project which looked at the exchange of language through face-to-face conversations and found text. The subjects included Egyptologist Joann Fletcher, comedian Arthur Smith, actor Judi Dench, fashion guru Gok Wan, comedian Francesca Martinez and writer Joanne Harris.

She has also retraced her sculpture roots through making a series of large direct plaster sculptures.

== Works and Projects ==
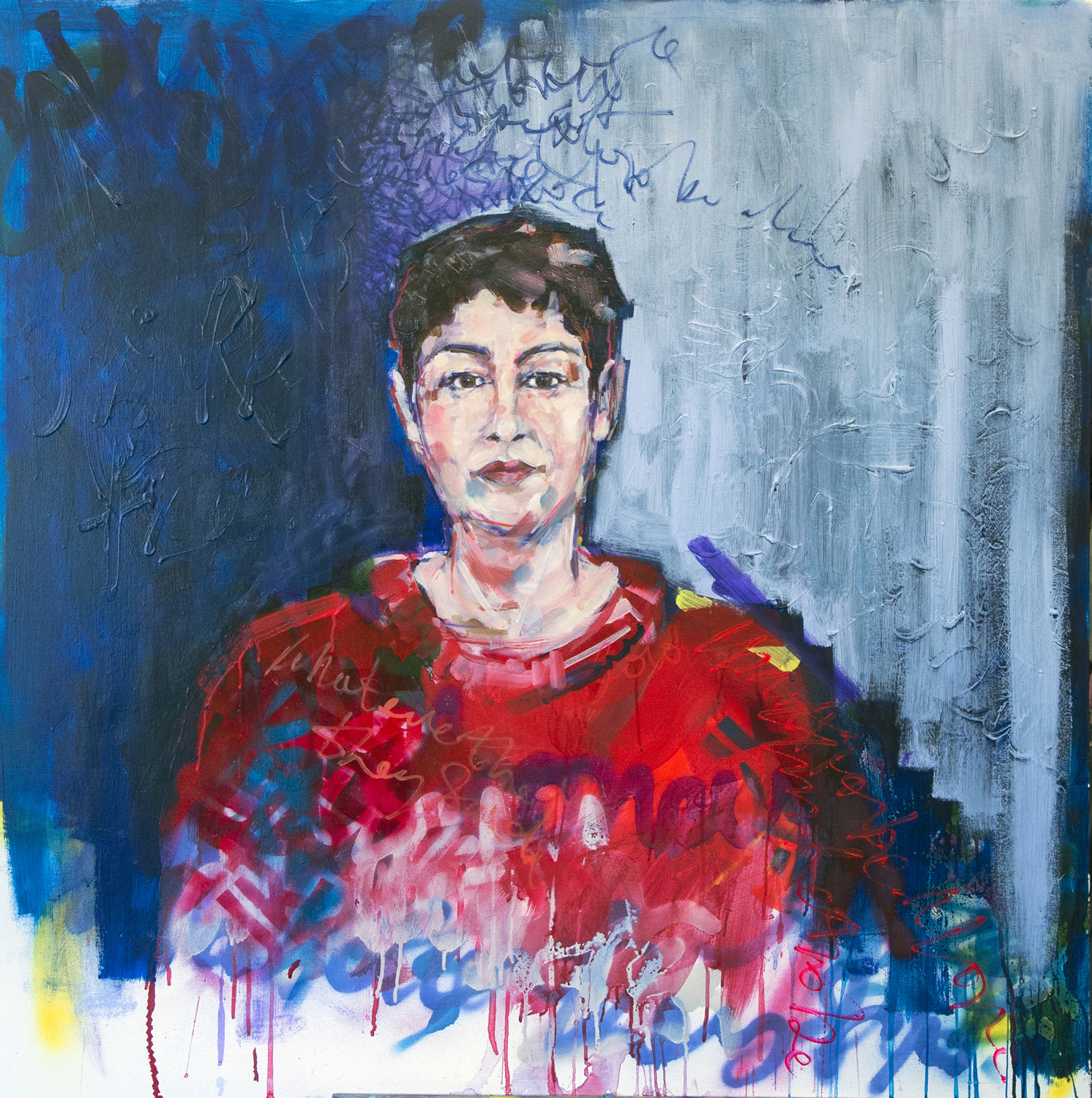
Joanne Harris

In 2016 Clarke-Stables worked on #LettersFromTheHeart, a project about women and war and their messages of love. She collected love letters, texts, and emails sent or received during wartime. The finished exhibition will consist of portraits and sculptures and will be shown in several venues across the country including in Liverpool, London and Leeds.

Clarke-Stables is interested in engaging with the public and local communities through her art projects. Her third project, #HOMETheVanProject was a school project for young people, giving them the opportunity to create their own small pieces of art. The project started in Yorkshire and travelled across the UK. One of the schools and colleges visited by her green van was Darton College.

Other recent work includes a piece commissioned by Jo Brand for The Eve Appeal. Michelle completed a portrait of the late comedian Linda Smith who died from ovarian cancer. The work was exhibited at Claridges alongside the world's emerging and leading female artists.

== Life and career ==
Clarke-Stables studied Sculpture at Stafford Art College before completing her Fine Art degree at Leeds University. She went on to complete her Masters in Fine Art Practice at Leeds Metropolitan University. For ten years she worked in education as an Art Facilitator and Teacher.
