= Darton College =

Darton College may refer to:

- Darton College, Darton, former name of Darton Academy, Darton, South Yorkshire, England
- Darton State College, former name of Albany State University West Campus, Albany, Georgia, United States

== See also ==
- Darton (disambiguation)
