= List of mills in South Yorkshire =

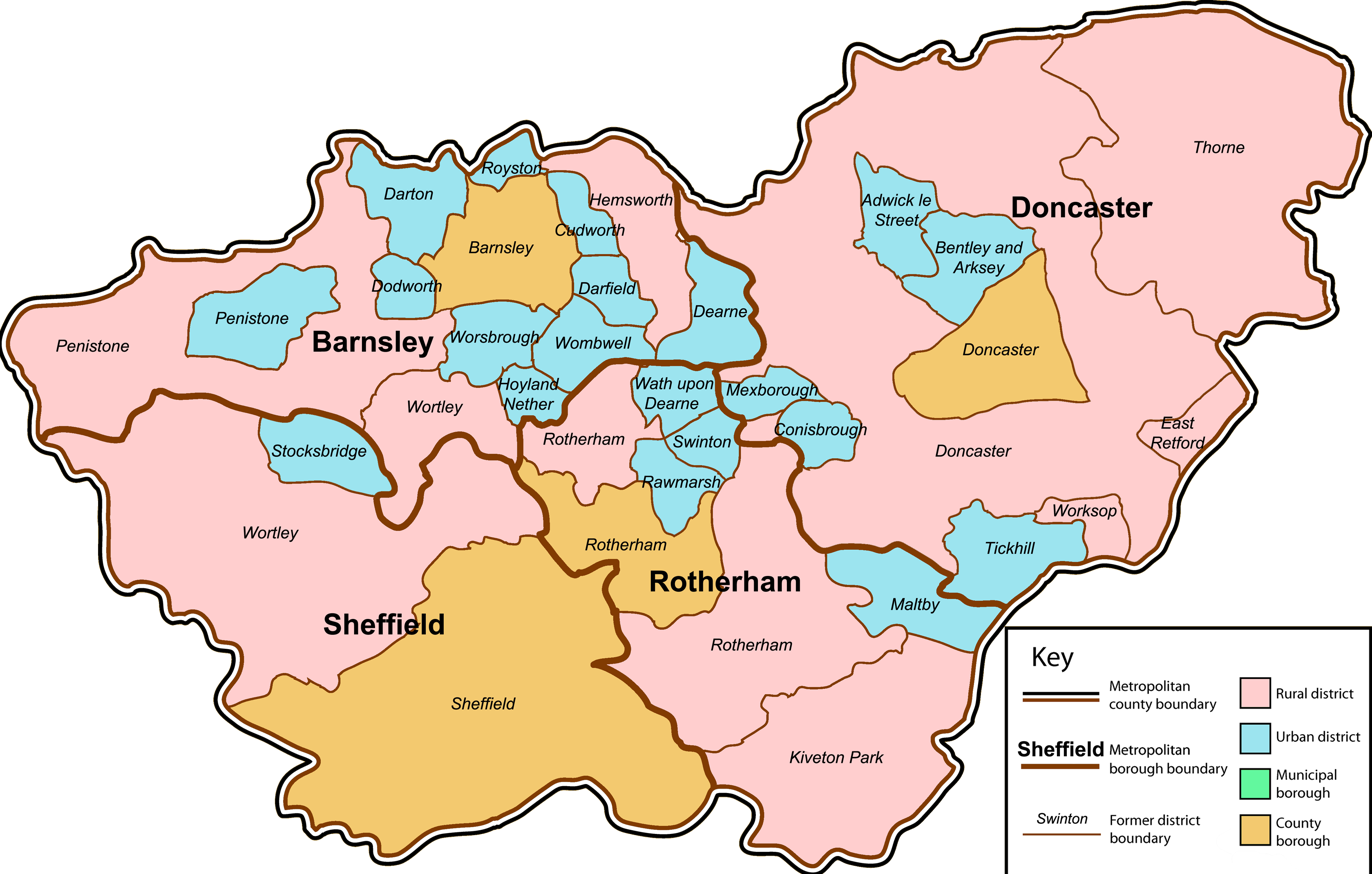

This is a list of the wool, cotton and other textile mills in South Yorkshire, England.

== Ardsley (Barnsley) ==
Name	Architect	Location	Built	Demolished	Served (Years)
Stairfoot Bleachworks		Ardsley (Barnsley), SE 3729 0542 53°32′39″N 1°26′19″W			
	Notes: National Building Register:63795: (C)				
Stairfoot Dyeworks		Ardsley (Barnsley),			
	Notes: (see Stairfoot Bleachworks)				

== Barnsley ==
Name	Architect	Location	Built	Demolished	Served (Years)
Beevor Hall Bleachworks		Barnsley, SE 3565 0635 53°33′09″N 1°27′48″W			
	Notes: National Building Register:63794: (B)				
Bleachworks		Barnsley, SE 34 07 53°33′31″N 1°29′18″W			
	Notes: National Building Register:5: 638				
Borespring Mill		Barnsley, SE 3424 0623 53°33′06″N 1°29′05″W			
	Notes: National Building Register:63800: (C)				
Dyeworks		Barnsley, SE 34 06 53°32′58″N 1°29′18″W			
	Notes: National Building Register:6: 638				
Green Foot Bleachworks		Barnsley, SE 3388 0822 53°34′10″N 1°29′24″W			
	Notes: National Building Register:63801: (C)				
Hope Dyeworks		Barnsley, SE 3405 0619 53°33′04″N 1°29′15″W			
	Notes: National Building Register:63799: (C)				
Hope Mill		Barnsley, SE 3410 0645 53°33′13″N 1°29′12″W			
	Notes: National Building Register:63790: (A)				
Hope Works		Barnsley,			
	Notes: (see Hope Mill)				
Hoyle Mill Bleachworks		Barnsley, SE 3614 0659 53°33′17″N 1°27′21″W			
	Notes: National Building Register:63798: (C)				
Malton Place, 20-26 Pitt Street		Barnsley, SE 3425 0619 53°33′04″N 1°29′04″W			
	Notes: National Building Register:63796: (A)				
Oak Mill		Barnsley, SE 3398 0625 53°33′06″N 1°29′19″W			
	Notes: National Building Register:63788: (C)				
Old Mill		Barnsley, SE 3499 0720 53°33′37″N 1°28′24″W			
	Notes: National Building Register:63793: (C)				
Old Mill Bleachworks		Barnsley, SE 348 072 53°33′37″N 1°28′34″W			
	Notes: National Building Register:792: (B)				
Peel Street Mill		Barnsley,			
	Notes: (see Taylor’s Mill)				
Pinder Oaks Bleachworks		Barnsley, SE 35 05 53°32′26″N 1°28′24″W			
	Notes: National Building Register:4: 638				
Rob Royd Bleachworks		Barnsley, SE 3308 0433 53°32′04″N 1°30′09″W			
	Notes: National Building Register:63803: (C)				
Rodney Row		Barnsley, SE 3501 0600 53°32′58″N 1°28′23″W			
	Notes: National Building Register:63797: (C)				
Shaw Mill		Barnsley, SE 3390 0600 53°32′58″N 1°29′23″W			
	Notes: National Building Register:63789: (C)				
Taylor’s Mill		Barnsley, SE 3424 0633 53°33′09″N 1°29′05″W			
	Notes: National Building Register:63791: (B)				
Union Mill		Barnsley, SE 3405 0635 53°33′10″N 1°29′15″W			
	Notes: National Building Register:63811: (C)				
Utilitas Works		Barnsley, SE 3398 0640 53°33′11″N 1°29′19″W			
	Notes: National Building Register:63812: (C)				
Warehouse, Eastgate		Barnsley, SE 3447 0659 53°33′17″N 1°28′52″W			
	Notes: National Building Register:63809: (B)				
Warehouse, St Mary’s Place		Barnsley, SE 343 065 53°33′14″N 1°29′01″W			
	Notes: National Building Register:808: (B)				

== Barugh (Darton; Barnsley) ==
Name	Architect	Location	Built	Demolished	Served (Years)
Red Brook Bleachworks		Barugh (Darton; Barnsley), SE 3215 0770 53°33′54″N 1°30′58″W			
	Notes: National Building Register:63787: (B)				

== Cudworth ==
Name	Architect	Location	Built	Demolished	Served (Years)
Midland Bleachworks		Cudworth, SE 3810 0890 53°34′31″N 1°25′34″W			
	Notes: National Building Register:63807: (C)				

== Dodworth ==
Name	Architect	Location	Built	Demolished	Served (Years)
Weaver's cottage		Dodworth, SE 31 05 53°32′27″N 1°32′01″W			
	Notes: National Building Register:0: 638				

== Oxspring ==
Name	Architect	Location	Built	Demolished	Served (Years)
Kirkwood Mill		Oxspring, SE 2595 0293 53°31′21″N 1°36′36″W			
	Notes: National Building Register:63786: (B)				

== Thurlstone (Penistone) ==
Name	Architect	Location	Built	Demolished	Served (Years)
Hoyle Mill		Thurlstone (Penistone), SE 2378 0361 53°31′43″N 1°38′34″W			
	Notes: National Building Register:63785: (B)				
Oil Mill		Thurlstone (Penistone),			
	Notes: (see Hoyle Mill)				
Plumpton Mill		Thurlstone (Penistone), SE 2292 0330 53°31′33″N 1°39′21″W			
	Notes: National Building Register:63784: (B)				
The'Old Mill		Thurlstone (Penistone), SE 2181 0304 53°31′25″N 1°40′21″W			
	Notes: National Building Register:63783: (B)				
