= Listed buildings in Darton =

Darton is a village and surrounding area in the metropolitan borough of Barnsley, South Yorkshire, England, consisting of two wards, Darton East and Darton West. The wards contain 48 listed buildings that are recorded in the National Heritage List for England. Of these, one is listed at Grade I, the highest of the three grades, and the others are at Grade II, the lowest grade. The wards contain the villages of Darton, Barugh and Kexbrough, the area of Wilthorpe, and the surrounding region. The most important building in the list is All Saints Church, Darton, which is listed together with items in the churchyard, including many graveslabs. Most of the other buildings are houses, cottages and associated structures, farmhouses and farm buildings. The other listed buildings include a former Sunday school, a former Methodist church, a bridge, and a series of mileposts or milestones.

== Key ==
Grade	Criteria
I	Particularly important buildings of more than special interest
II	Buildings of national importance and special interest

== Buildings ==
Name and location	Photograph	Date	Notes	Grade
Cross base and shaft 53.58473°N 1.53163°W	—	Medieval (possible)	The cross base and shaft are in the churchyard of All Saints Church, and are in gritstone. The base is square, and the shaft is square with cambered sides. On the sides at the top of the shaft are inscribed initials and a date.	II
Two graveslabs 53.58476°N 1.53181°W	—	Medieval	The two grave slabs are in the churchyard of All Saints Church, and are in sandstone, the later slab dated 1723. The medieval slab is plain apart from an incised fleury cross with a stepped base. The later slab is to the memory of Anthony Dury, and there are later inscriptions. It is plain with simple decoration at the top, and with a line between the inscriptions.	II
All Saints Church; 53.58494°N 1.53155°W		1517	The church, which was restored in 1867–68, is in gritstone, the nave has a Welsh slate roof, the aisles have lead roofs, and the church is in Perpendicular style. It consists of a nave with a clerestory, north and south aisles, a south porch, a chancel with north and south chapels, and a west tower. The tower is tall with two stages, diagonal buttresses, a west doorway with a moulded surround, a three-light west window, and an embattled parapet. The body of the church also has embattled parapets, and the east window is large with five lights.	I
Barn, Kexbrough Hall Farm; 53.58144°N 1.54866°W	—	16th or 17th century	The barn is timber framed with later cladding in stone. It has a sheet metal roof, and there are seven bays. In the third and fifth bays are square-headed cart entries.	II
Barn opposite 58 Jebb Lane, Haigh; 53.60396°N 1.55732°W	—	17th century (probable)	The barn is in stone, with quoins, and a stone slate roof with chamfered gable copings and moulded kneelers. There are five bays, and the barn contains square-headed cart entries, blocked slit vents, and a square pitching hole.	II
Raised graveslab 53.58482°N 1.53166°W	—	c. 1652	The raised grave slab is in the churchyard of All Saints Church, and is to the memory of members of the Beaumont family. It is an orange stone slab with moulded sides, and arched decoration at the head depicting in relief a bull, and at each corner, a skull and crossbones.	II
Carr graveslab 53.58482°N 1.53238°W	—	c. 1653	The grave slab is in the churchyard of All Saints Church, and is to the memory of Nicolas Carr, junior. It consists of a plain thick sandstone slab with rounded top and an inscription.	II
Farm buildings, Birthwaite Hall Farm; 53.59046°N 1.54805°W	—	17th century	The range of farm buildings is in stone with a continuous hood mould, and a stone slate roof with chamfered gable copings and moulded kneelers on the right. The range is in two and three storeys, and all the windows have chamfered and moulded surrounds. The openings include six animal doors with quoined surrounds, mullioned windows with some mullions missing, doorways, one of which has moulded jambs and an ornamental lintel, and segmental-headed cart entries.	II
Birthwaite Hall and attached range 53.58997°N 1.54713°W		Late 17th century (probable)	A large house that has been altered, extended and divided. It is in stone on a moulded plinth, with quoins, moulded floor bands, and a Welsh slate roof with chamfered gable copings. There are two storeys and attics, and an H-shaped plan, with a front of nine bas, the outer three bays at each end projecting and gabled. The left return has five bays, a central doorway, a Gothic arcaded frieze, and an embattled parapet. The four buttresses rise to octagonal embattled pinnacles. Attached at the right is a series of single-storey buildings. The windows in all parts are sashes.	II
Haigh Hall Farmhouse; 53.60078°N 1.56019°W	—	Late 17th century	The farmhouse, which was remodelled in the late 18th century, is in stone with quoins and a hipped roof. There are two storeys and five bays. On the front is a 19th-century porch and sash windows, and at the rear are the remains of 17th-century mullioned windows.	II
Principal barn at The Oaks; 53.58632°N 1.51785°W	—	Late 17th century (probable)	A horse engine house was added to the barn in the 19th century. The barn is in stone, partly rendered, with quoins, and a roof of stone slate with some Welsh slate. There are five bays, a two-bay outshut on the front, and the horse engine house at the rear. In the front is a full-height square-headed cart entry, and the horse engine house has one bay and a four-sided apsidal end.	II
Brown graveslab 53.58477°N 1.53209°W	—	c. 1689	The grave slab is in the churchyard of All Saints Church, and is to the memory of John Brown, and there are later additions. It is in sandstone, and has decoration in relief, and inscriptions.	II
Footstone; 53.58483°N 1.53214°W	—	c. 1697	The footstone is in the churchyard of All Saints Church. It is in sandstone, and consists of an oval-shaped standing stone inscribed with initials and dates.	II
Three Hemingway graveslabs 53.58482°N 1.53136°W	—	c. 1713	The three grave slabs are in the churchyard of All Saints Church, and are to the memory of members of the Hemingway family. They are in sandstone, and have moulded edges, and rounded decoration at the top. The left slab has relief ornamentation at the top corners, and the middle and right slabs have winged angels.	II
Audin graveslab 53.58470°N 1.53157°W	—	c. 1716	The grave slab is in the churchyard of All Saints Church, and is to the memory of members of the Audin family. It is in sandstone, and has moulded sides, an inscription, and winged masks at the top corners.	II
Pollard graveslab 53.58481°N 1.53237°W	—	c. 1716	The grave slab is in the churchyard of All Saints Church, and is to the memory of Grace Pollard. It is in sandstone with a decorative surround and a scroll at the bottom. In the top corners are relief carvings of hourglasses, and a rounded decoration of vines.	II
Webster graveslab 53.58480°N 1.53166°W	—	c. 1717	The grave slab is in the churchyard of All Saints Church, and is to the memory of members of the Webster family, and there is a later inscription. It is in sandstone, with relief arched decoration at the top, an inscription, and a poem.	II
Three graveslabs 53.58465°N 1.53177°W	—	c. 1719	The three grave slabs are in the churchyard of All Saints Church, and are to the memory of members of the Cudworth and Hirst families, and are in sandstone. The left slab has simple arched decoration, and a winged angel in relief in the centre. The middle slab has moulded edges and arched decoration at the top, and the right slab has moulded sides, and is divided by a line into two halves, each with rounded decoration at the top.	II
Milns graveslab 53.58480°N 1.53169°W	—	c. 1719	The grave slab is in the churchyard of All Saints Church, and is to the memory of members of the Milns family, and there are later inscriptions. It is in sandstone, it has simple line decoration to the edge, and is arched at the top.	II
17, 19 and 21 Church Street; 53.58531°N 1.53256°W		1721	Originally a vicarage, later three houses, they are in stone on a plinth, with quoins, and stone slate roofs with coped gables and kneelers. There are two storeys, and a T-shaped plan with additions. On the front are two doorways with massive lintels, and mullioned windows with hood moulds. On the west gable wall is a canted bay window, and in the east front is a tall stair window.	II
Greaves graveslab 53.58485°N 1.53214°W	—	c. 1723	The grave slab is in the churchyard of All Saints Church, and is to the memory of Sarah Greaves. It is in sandstone and has a decorative sawtooth surround, relief decoration at the head, flowers at the base, and foliage to the sides.	II
Mabson graveslab and footstone 53.58485°N 1.53161°W	—	c. 1723	The grave slab and footstone are in the churchyard of All Saints Church. The grave slab is to the memory of George Mabson and his daughter, and the later footstone is oval, and is initialled. They are in sandstone, and both have simple line decoration.	II
Gate piers, Birthwaite Hall; 53.59037°N 1.54764°W		Early 18th century (probable)	The pair of gate piers is at the north entrance to the hall. The piers are in stone and square, and each is panelled, with a moulded cornice, a gadrooned pedestal, and a ball finial.	II
Haigh Hall; 53.60062°N 1.56015°W	—	Early 18th century	A large house, possibly on an earlier core, it is in stone on a moulded plinth, with raised quoins, a moulded floor band, moulded gutter brackets, and a hipped stone slate roof. There are two storeys, a symmetrical front of five bays, and a lower two-storey link to the left. The central doorway has a moulded architrave and a triangular pediment, and the windows are sashes in raised surrounds. The link has a central doorway with a fanlight in a moulded surround, and above is a Diocletian window with a raised keystone. At the rear is a doorway with a quoined surround, and sash windows in moulded chamfered surrounds. In the left return is a Venetian window.	II
Gibson graveslab 53.58478°N 1.53239°W	—	c. 1729	The grave slab is in the churchyard of All Saints Church, and is to the memory of John Gibson and his wife, and there are later inscriptions. It is in sandstone and has a simple moulded surround.	II
55 and 57 Jebb Lane, Haigh; 53.60355°N 1.55624°W		Early to mid 18th century	A pair of stone cottages, the left gable rendered, with quoins, and a stone slate roof with coped gables and moulded kneelers. There are two storeys, each cottage has one bay, and at the rear is n outshut. One window has been replaced, and the others are mullioned with three lights.	II
Farm building north of Haigh Hall Farmhouse; 53.60096°N 1.56026°W	—	Early to mid 18th century	The farm building is in stone, with quoins, and a hipped corrugated asbestos roof. There are two storeys and five bays. The building contains a segmental-headed cart entrance with a quoined surround, doorways with quoined surrounds, and double-chamfered windows. On the right gable end are external steps leading to an upper floor doorway.	II
Hobson graveslab 53.58473°N 1.53180°W	—	c. 1737	The grave slab is in the churchyard of All Saints Church, and is to the memory of Richard Hobson, and there is a later inscription. It is in sandstone and has rounded decoration at the top and moulding at the bottom.	II
Traviss graveslab 53.58476°N 1.53171°W	—	c. 1741	The raised grave slab is in the churchyard of All Saints Church, and is to the memory of members of the Traviss family. It is in sandstone, and has a moulded edge and arched decoration at the top.	II
Barns opposite 55 and 57 Jebb Lane, Haigh; 53.60352°N 1.55667°W	—	Mid 18th century	The barns are in stone, with quoins, and stone slate roofs with coped gables and moulded kneelers. They form an L-shaped plan, with two ranges at right angles. The barns contain cart entries, animal doors, windows, and square pitching holes.	II
Haigh Hall Lodge; 53.60214°N 1.55860°W	—	Mid 18th century	The lodge is at the entrance to the drive, and was extended in the 20th century. It is in stone with quoins, and two storeys. The gable end faces the lane, and has an open pediment. On the left is a single-storey extension, and at the rear is a two-storey rendered extension. The gable end contains a tripartite window in the ground floor and a Diocletian window above, breaking into the tympanum of the pediment. On the right return is a porch.	II
Farm buildings and barn, Squirrel Hall Farm; 53.58670°N 1.55628°W	—	Mid 18th century (probable)	The barn and farm buildings are in stone with quoins and stone slate roofs with coped gables and moulded kneelers. The buildings form an L-shaped plan, the barn with five bays, and the other buildings at right angles with two storeys. The barn contains a central square-headed cart entry with a quoined surround, and an opposing entry at the rear. In the farm buildings are animal doors, single lights, and, in the left return, steps lead to an upper floor doorway.	II
Swithen House; 53.59672°N 1.55028°W	—	Mid 18th century	The farmhouse is in stone, with quoins, a floor band, and a stone slate roof with coped gables and moulded kneelers. There are two storeys, four bays, and a later extension on the left. All the openings on the front have raised moulded surrounds. There are doorways in the first and third bays, and the windows are sashes.	II
Swift graveslab 53.58481°N 1.53218°W	—	c. 1758	The grave slab is in the churchyard of All Saints Church, and is to the memory of members of the Swift family. It is in sandstone, and has a moulded surround and winged skulls at the top corners.	II
Clarke graveslab 53.58460°N 1.53184°W	—	c. 1758	The grave slab is in the churchyard of All Saints Church, and is to the memory of members of the Clarke family. It is in sandstone and has a moulded edge, and arched decoration at the head with stylised winged angels.	II
Gardener's Cottage, Birthwaite Hall; 53.59001°N 1.54781°W	—	Mid to late 18th century	A summer house, later a private house, in red brick with stone dressings, quoins, a floor band, a moulded eaves cornice and blocking course, and a pyramidal tile roof. There are two storeys, and fronts of one and two bays. The windows are sashes with moulded architraves.	II
Ha-ha, Haigh Hall; 53.60066°N 1.55976°W	—	1770s	The ha-ha is to the south and east of the hall, and consists of a stone wall with a ditch on the outer side. To the southeast of the hall is a gateway and stone piers with moulded tops.	II
Summer house, Haigh Hall; 53.60038°N 1.56214°W	—	1770s (probable)	The summer house in the grounds of the hall was later extended to the right. It is in red brick with a stone slate roof. In the centre is a round-arched doorway with flanking narrow lights, all set in a round-arched recess; all the arches are archivolted. The gable is coped, and has an open pediment. The interior has a semicircular plan and is domed.	II
Statue in orchard of Birthwaite Hall; 53.59074°N 1.54725°W	—	Late 18th century (probable)	The statue is in limestone on a sandstone pedestal. It depicts a naked man with a cloak over his shoulders, and is said to depict John Silvester. On the pedestal are fielded panels and a moulded cornice.	II
Windhill Gate farmhouse and outbuildings 53.59909°N 1.51907°W		C. 1800	The farmhouse and attached outbuildings are in stone with stone slate roofs, and mainly have two storeys. The farmhouse has a symmetrical front of three bays, and a central doorway with monolithic jambs and a fanlight. Attached at right angles are a two-bay house that has a doorway with monolithic jambs, a building with a segmental cart entry and a circular window above, and a square three-story dovecote with a pyramidal roof. At right angles on the right is a seven-bay barn with a cart entry, and external steps leading to an upper floor doorway.	II
Former Sunday school 53.58615°N 1.53084°W		1818	The Sunday school, later used for other purposes, is in stone, and has a hipped Welsh slate roof. There is a single storey, a symmetrical front of five bays, and a later lean-to extension at the rear. The central doorway has a plain surround and a cornice, and above it is an inscribed and dated tablet. The outer bays contain tall casement windows with stone lintels and raised keystones.	II
Former United Methodist Free Church and railings 53.58427°N 1.50565°W	—	1829	The church, later used for other purposes, is in stone and has a Welsh slate roof, hipped at the rear, and with a coped gable at the front. There are two storeys, and a front of two bays. On the front are two round-arched doorways with fanlights, between them is an inscribed and dated tablet, and in the gable apex is a round-arched window. In front of the building are iron railings.	II
Barugh Bridge; 53.57765°N 1.51749°W		1850	The bridge carries Dearne Hall Road (B6428 road) over the River Dearne. It is in sandstone and consists of a single segmental arch. The bridge has vermiculated voussoirs, a moulded band at the base of a vermiculated parapet, and terminal buttresses, the northwest buttress dated.	II
Milestone, Barnsley Road; 53.59842°N 1.49647°W		Mid 19th century	The milestone is on the east side of Barnsley Road (A61 road). It is in cast iron and has a triangular plan. The milestone is inscribed with the distances to Barnsley and Wakefield.	II
Milepost, Wilthorpe Road; 53.56543°N 1.50218°W		Mid to late 19th century	The milepost is on the south side of Wilthorpe Road (A635 road). It is in is stone, with cast iron overlay, and has a triangular plan and a rounded top. On the top is "BARNSLEY & GRANGEMOOR ROAD" and "BARAUGH", and on the sides are the distances to Huddersfield, Barnsley, Holmfirth. Denby Dale, Bretton, and Cawthorne.	II
Milepost, Barugh Green Road; 53.56735°N 1.52570°W		Mid to late 19th century	The milepost is on the south side of Barugh Green Road (A635 road). It is in is stone, with cast iron overlay, and has a triangular plan and a rounded top. On the top is "BARNSLEY & SHEPLEY LANE HEAD ROAD" and "BARAUGH" and on the sides are the distances to Barnsley, Holmfirth. Denby Dale, and Cawthorne.	II
Milepost, Claycliffe Road; 53.57025°N 1.52229°W		Mid to late 19th century	The milepost is on the southwest side of Claycliffe Road (A637 road). It is in is stone, with cast iron overlay, and has a triangular plan and a rounded top. On the top is "BARNSLEY & GRANGEMOOR ROAD" and "BARAUGH", and on the sides are the distances to Huddersfield, Barnsley, and Bretton.	II
Milestone, Kexbrough; 53.58927°N 1.55143°W		Mid to late 19th century	The milepost is on the west side of Huddersfield Road (A637 road). It is in is stone, with cast iron overlay, and has a triangular plan and a rounded top. On the top is "BARNSLEY & GRANGEMOOR ROAD" and "KEXBOROUGH", and on the sides are the distances to Huddersfield, Barnsley, and Bretton.	II
