= John Sylvester =

John Sylvester may refer to:

- John Sylvester (admiral) (1904–1990), United States Navy admiral
- John Sylvester (American football) (1923–2012), halfback who played in the All-America Football Conference
- John Sylvester (cricketer) (born 1969), Grenadian cricketer
- John N. Sylvester (1909–1993), American politician in the state of Washington
- John B. Sylvester, United States Army general
- Johnny Sylvester (1915–1990), American businessman associated with Babe Ruth
- John Sylvester, one of the pen names of British author Hector Hawton (1901–1975)

== See also ==
- John Silvester (disambiguation)
