= Senator Runner =

Senator Runner may refer to:

- George Runner (born 1952), California State Senate
- Sharon Runner (1954–2016), California State Senate
- W. E. Runner (1851–1931), Washington State Senate
