= W. B. Scott =

W. B. Scott may refer to:

- William Bell Scott (1811–1890), British poet and artist
- William Bennett Scott Sr., newspaper publisher and civil rights advocate for African Americans
- William Berryman Scott (1858–1947), American paleontologist
- William Berkley "W. B." Scott (1904–1981), British racing driver

== See also ==
- William Scott (disambiguation)
