= Thomas Special =

Grand Prix car

- Category: 1.5l Grand Prix formula
- Constructor: Thomas
- Designer: J. G. Parry Thomas
- Production: 2

Technical specifications
- Chassis: Channel-section underslung
- Suspension: (Front) Semi-elliptic leaf springs (Rear) 1/4 elliptic leaf springs
- Engine: Thomas 1,496cc inline 8 cyl 1 supercharged, 1 normally aspirated
- Transmission: 4, in X pattern
- Tyres: Dunlop

Competition history
- Notable drivers: J. G. Parry Thomas, Scrap Thistlethwayte, Clive Gallop, W. B. Scott, Harold Purdey
- Debut: 1926 British Grand Prix
- Last event: 1927 British Grand Prix
Entries	Races
2	1

The Thomas Special was a Grand Prix car built by J. G. Parry Thomas, and which took part in the 1927 British Grand Prix.

== History ==
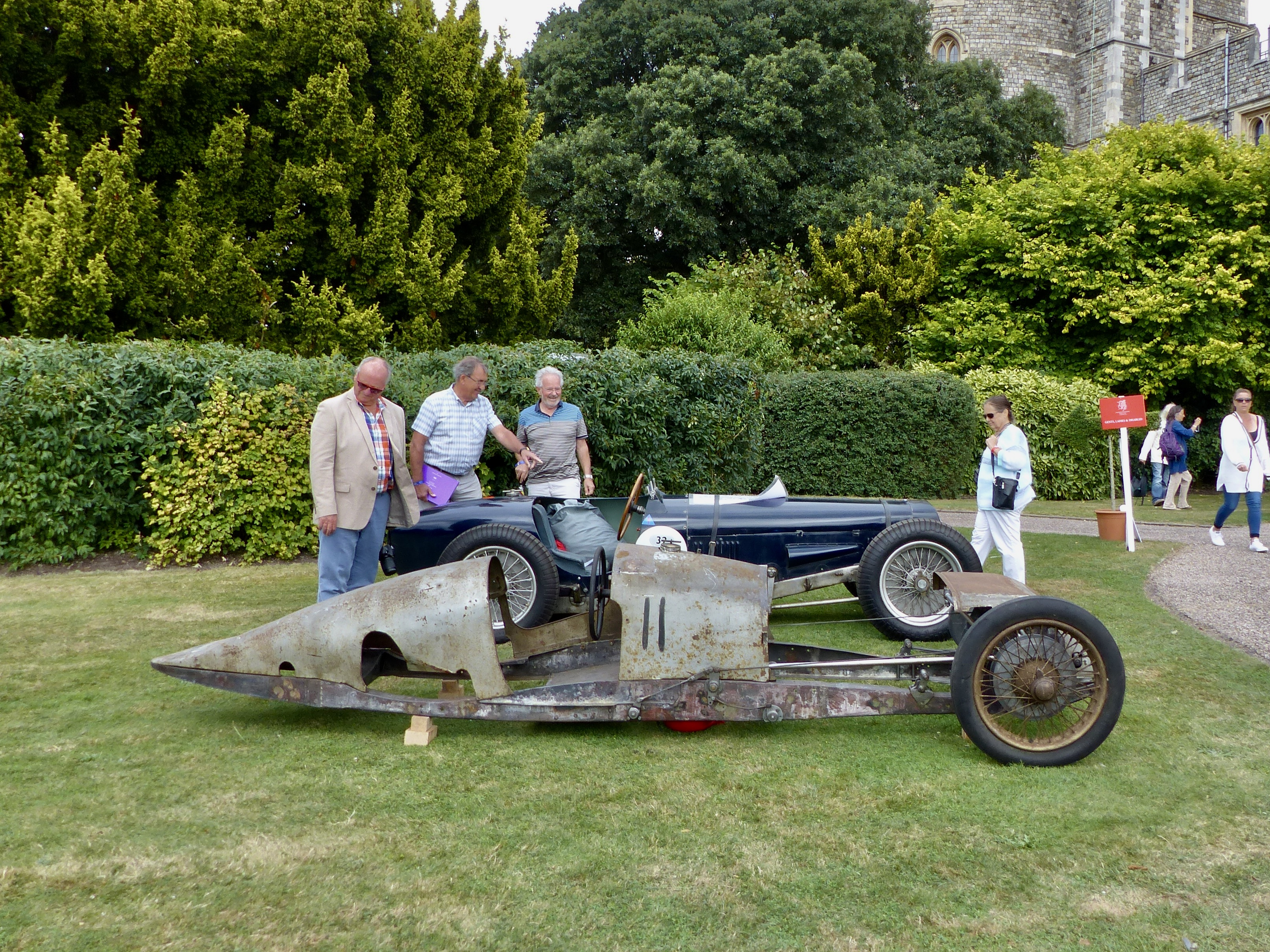
The Thomas Special (No. 2) in unrestored state (in front of a 1928 Delage), Windsor Castle, 2016

Thomas was an experienced Brooklands racer, with workshops on site, and conceived the low-slung Thomas Special in order to take part in road racing. He built two examples in 1926, with a 1,494cc 8-cylinder inline engine of his own design. The gearbox configuration was unusual - as second and third gears were the most common to be used, the shift from first to second was backwards and right, and from second to third was forward.

The aim was to have them ready for the 1926 British Grand Prix, and Thomas sold the second example to Scrap Thistlethwayte, confusingly painting "Thomas Special 1" on its side to flatter its new owner that he had the original. Thomas had also prepared a supercharger, but, unable to manufacture two, fitted it to the car he sold to Thistlethwayte. Thomas retained the first model, with "Thomas Special 2" painted thereon, and both entered the Grand Prix, Thistlethwayte nominated Clive Gallop as driver. Neither was ready for the race due to gearbox machining errors, and they appeared for the first time at the 1926 Brooklands 200 Miles race, Thistlethwayte breaking his gearbox in practice and non-starting, but Thomas finished 8th; the low design - aided by the transmission running to the side of the driver, rather than underneath - led to the cars being nicknamed Flatirons.

Thistlethwayte soon returned No. 1 to Thomas, who had plans to adopt it for record breaking, but he killed in an attempt on the Land Speed Record in March 1927. No. 1 was sold to Harold Purdy and No. 2 to W. B. Scott, and both raced their examples at the British Grand Prix that October, but both retired; the husky Scott soon sold No. 2, finding it difficult to fit in.

== Post-Grand Prix use ==
E. M. Thomas (soon to marry Jill Scott, who at the time was still married to W. B. Scott) used No. 2 it in the 1929 International 500 Miles Race, Purdy being a non-starter. Purdy had better luck in the race in 1931, at least making the start, but retiring after 25 laps.

No. 2 eventually broke diesel speed records in the 1930s with a Perkins diesel engine fitted. Purdy finished 5th in the 1927 200 mile race in No. 1, which eventually went to Canada, where it was scrapped in the 1950s; the engine however was saved, and was fitted to No. 2 during a restoration in the 2010s.
