= Robert Waldron =

Robert Waldron may refer to:

- Robert E. Waldron (1920–2000), member of the Michigan House of Representatives
- Robert F. Waldron (1903–1952), member of the Washington House of Representatives
