= Alban Turner =

English cricketer (1885–1951)

Alban Turner (2 September 1885 – 29 August 1951) was an English first-class cricketer, who played nine matches for Yorkshire County Cricket Club in 1910 and 1911.

Born in Darton, Yorkshire, England, Turner was a right-handed batsman, who scored 163 runs at 10.86, with a best score of 37 against Warwickshire. He took seven catches in the field, but did not bowl. He also played for the Yorkshire Second XI from 1906 to 1911, and for H. Hayley's XI in 1906.

Turner died in August 1951 in Goldthorpe, Yorkshire.
