= Bob Lewis (Washington politician) =

American politician

R. H. (Bob) Lewis
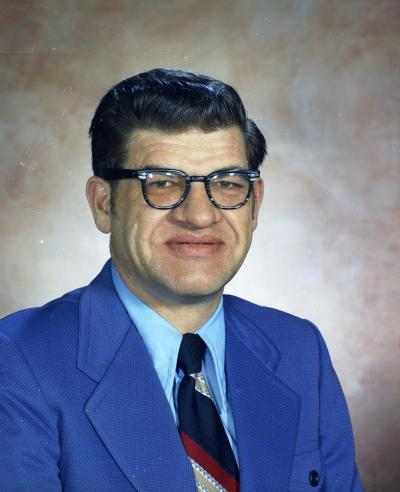
- Lewis in 1973

Member of the Washington Senate from the 5th district
- In office January 8, 1973 – January 12, 1981
- Preceded by: John L. Cooney
- Succeeded by: Jerry M. Hughes

Personal details
- Born: Robert Howard Lewis; February 15, 1925 Deer Park, Washington, U.S.
- Died: March 27, 2015 (aged 90) Spokane, Washington, U.S.
- Party: Republican
- Spouse: Peggye (deceased)

Robert Howard "Bob" Lewis (February 15, 1925 – March 27, 2015) was an American former politician in the state of Washington. He served the 5th district from 1973 to 1981. Lewis was in the savings and loan business. He also served on the Spokane City Council. Lewis died in Spokane, Washington on March 27, 2015.
