= Alexander Watt (politician) =

American politician

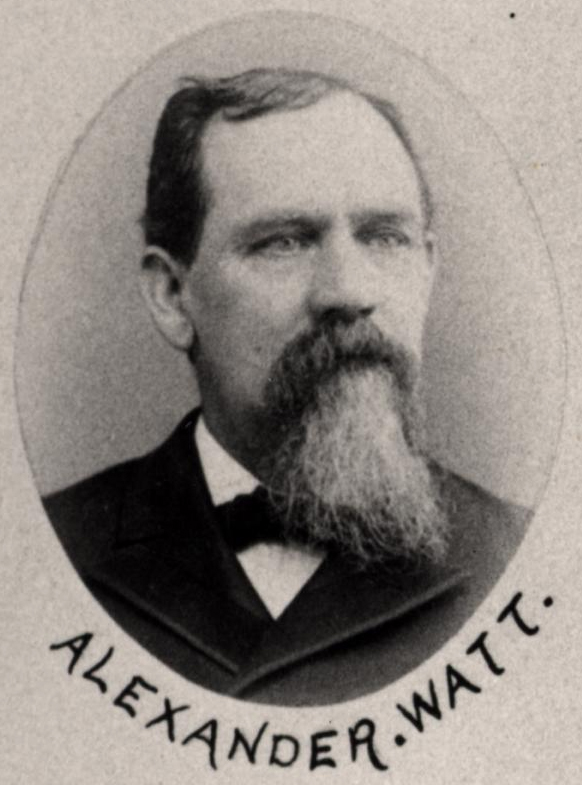
- Watt in 1891

Member of the Washington State Senate
- In office January 7, 1891 – January 9, 1893
- Preceded by: John T. Whalley
- Succeeded by: W. C. Belknap
- Constituency: 5th
- In office November 6, 1889 – January 7, 1891
- Preceded by: Constituency established
- Succeeded by: James O'Neill
- Constituency: 2nd

Personal details
- Born: September 26, 1834 Jefferson County, Ohio, U.S.
- Died: June 16, 1914 (aged 79) Cheney, Washington, U.S.
- Party: Republican
- Spouse: Nancy M. Martin (m. 1861)

Alexander Watt (September 26, 1834 – June 16, 1914) was an American politician in the state of Washington. He served in the Washington State Senate from 1889 to 1893.

== Biography ==
Alexander Watt was born in Jefferson County, Ohio in 1834.

He married Nancy M. Martin in 1861.

He died at his home in Cheney, Washington on June 16, 1914.
