= Edwin J. Templeton =

American politician

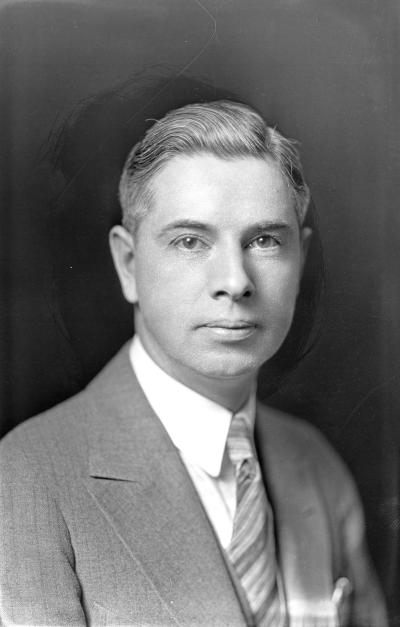
- Templeton in 1927

21st Speaker of the Washington House of Representatives
- In office January 12, 1931 – January 9, 1933
- Preceded by: Ed Davis
- Succeeded by: George F. Yantis

Member of the Washington House of Representatives for the 11th district
- In office 1925–1933

Personal details
- Born: December 25, 1891 Vancouver, Washington, United States
- Died: August 25, 1967 (aged 75) Washington, United States
- Party: Republican

Edwin J. Templeton (December 25, 1891 – August 25, 1967) was an American politician in the state of Washington. He served in the Washington House of Representatives from 1925 to 1933. He was Speaker of the House from 1931 to 1933.
