= Ralph R. Knapp =

American politician

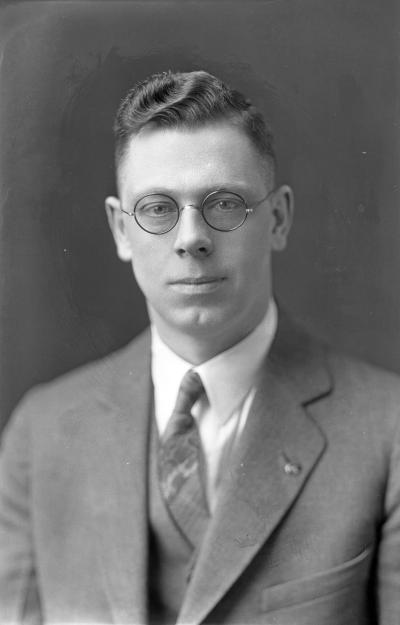
- Knapp in 1927

19th Speaker of the Washington House of Representatives
- In office January 10, 1927 – January 14, 1929
- Preceded by: Floyd B. Danskin
- Succeeded by: Ed Davis

Member of the Washington House of Representatives for the 43rd district
- In office 1917–1933

Personal details
- Born: December 4, 1889 Sackville, New Brunswick, Canada
- Died: June 1, 1961 (aged 71) Santa Cruz, California, United States
- Party: Republican

Ralph R. Knapp (December 4, 1889 – June 1, 1961) was an American politician in the state of Washington. He served in the Washington House of Representatives from 1917 to 1933. He was Speaker of the House from 1927 to 1929.
