= Thomas Brackin =

English cricketer

Thomas Brackin (5 January 1859 – 7 October 1924) was an English first-class cricketer, who played three matches for Yorkshire County Cricket Club in 1882.

Born in Thornes Common, Wakefield, Yorkshire, England, Brackin was a right-handed batsman, he scored 12 runs at an average of 2.00 per innings, with a best score of nine against Nottinghamshire. His right arm slow bowling was not called upon.

Brackin died aged 65, in October 1924, in Darton, Yorkshire.
