= Geraldine McCormick =

American politician (1924–2005)

Member of the Washington House of Representatives from the 5th district
- In office 1969–1982

Personal details
- Born: May 23, 1924 Spokane, Washington
- Died: December 26, 2005 (aged 81) Spokane, Washington
- Party: Democratic
- Education: Whitworth College

Geraldine McCormick (May 23, 1924 – December 26, 2005) was an American politician. She was a Democrat, representing District 5 in the Washington House of Representatives which included parts of Spokane County, from 1969 to 1982. In 2013, was profiled in the exhibit Political Pioneers: The Women Lawmakers.
