= Barugh, South Yorkshire =

Village in South Yorkshire, England

Coordinates: 53.570°N 1.522°W

Barugh
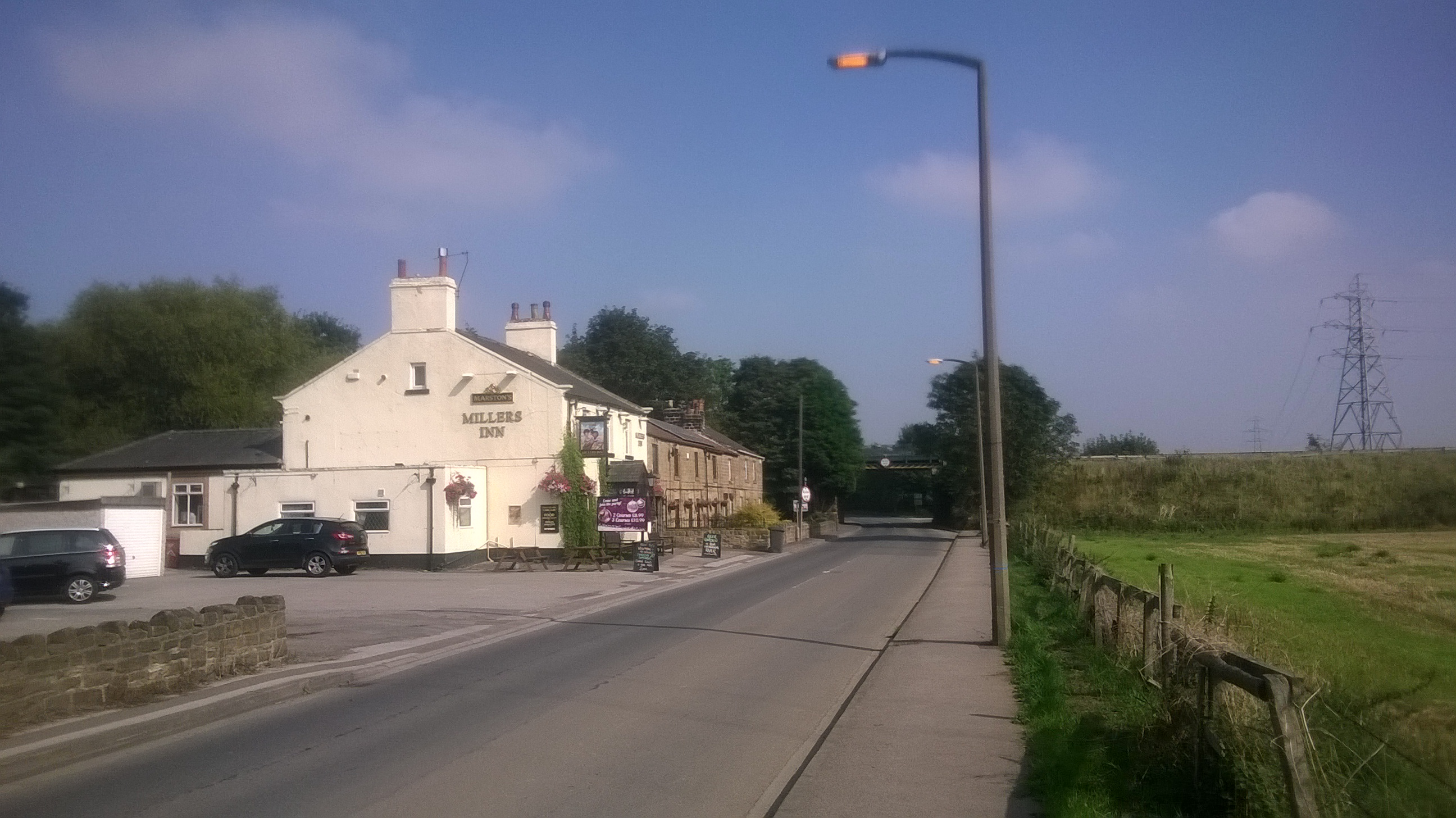
- The Millers Inn public house at Barugh

- Location within South Yorkshire
- Metropolitan borough: Barnsley
- Metropolitan county: South Yorkshire
- Region: Yorkshire and the Humber
- Country: England
- Sovereign state: United Kingdom
- Post town: BARNSLEY
- Postcode district: S75
- Dialling code: 01226
- Police: South Yorkshire
- Fire: South Yorkshire
- Ambulance: Yorkshire
- UK Parliament: Barnsley North

Barugh is a village in the metropolitan borough of Barnsley in South Yorkshire, England. The village falls within the Barnsley Metropolitan ward of Darton West. Until 1974 it was in the West Riding of Yorkshire.

== History ==
The name Barugh derives from the Old English berg meaning a 'tumulus'.

Barugh was formerly a township in the parish of Darton. It became a separate civil parishin 1866, which was abolished and merged back into Darton on 1 April 1938. In 1931 the parish had a population of 3679. It is now in the unparished area of Darton.

Barugh was formerly a township in the parish of Darton.[2] It became a separate civil parish in 1866, which was abolished and merged back into Darton on 1 April 1938

== See also ==
- Listed buildings in Darton
