= Kexbrough =

VILLAGE in SOUTH YORKSHIRE ENGLAND

Coordinates: 53.58°N 1.54°W

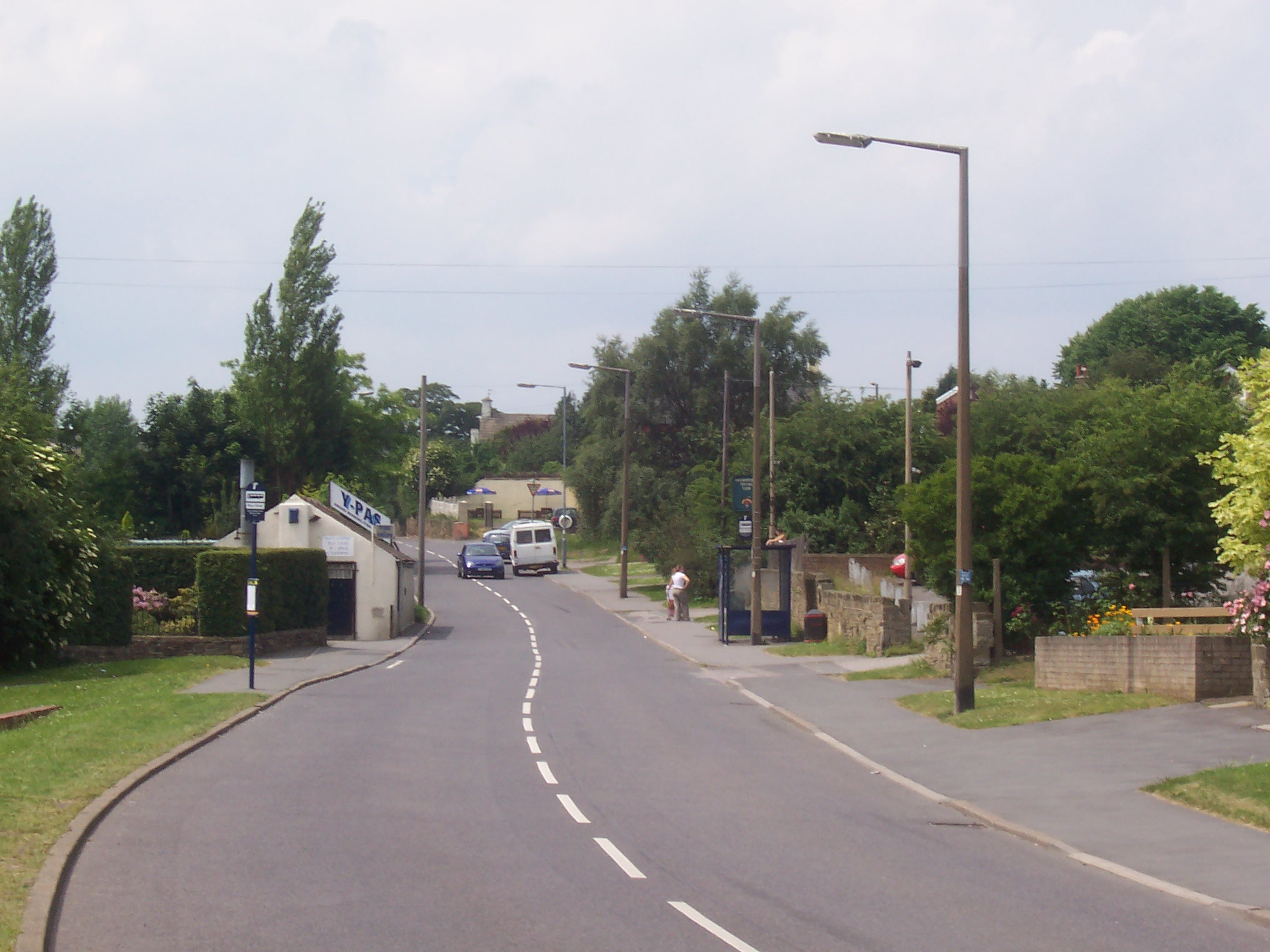
- Churchfield Lane in Kexbrough heading west towards High Hoyland

- Location within South Yorkshire
- OS grid reference: SE 304 093
- Metropolitan borough: Barnsley
- Metropolitan county: South Yorkshire
- Region: Yorkshire and the Humber
- Country: England
- Sovereign state: United Kingdom
- Post town: BARNSLEY
- Postcode district: S75
- Dialling code: 01226
- Police: South Yorkshire
- Fire: South Yorkshire
- Ambulance: Yorkshire
- UK Parliament: )

Kexbrough is a village in the Barnsley district, in the county of South Yorkshire, England, on the border with West Yorkshire. The village falls within the Darton West ward of Barnsley MBC. It is located west of the M1 motorway, just south of Junction 38 at an elevation of around 351 feet (107 m) above sea level. Historically the village was known as Kexborough, and includes the hamlets of Haigh and Swithin. Until 1974 it was in the West Riding of Yorkshire.

== History ==
Kexbrough is mentioned in the Domesday Book as belonging to Ilbert of Lacey, and having two villagers, a meadow, ploughlands and six furlongs of woodland. Historically in the parish of Darton and the wapentake of Staincross, the village is recorded in the Domesday Book as Chizeburg, being Kesseburgh in the 14th century, and Kexbrough by the 1580s. The place name is derived from a combination of the Old Norse personal name, Keptr and the Old English burh, which meant a fortified place.

The village is just west of the M1 motorway, about 351 feet (107 m) above sea level, being some 4.5 miles (7.2 km) north-west of Barnsley, and 8.5 miles (13.7 km) south of Wakefield.

Kexbrough was formerly a township in the parish of Darton, in 1866 Kexbrough became a separate civil parish, on 1 April 1938 the parish was abolished and merged with Darton. In 1931 the parish had a population of 1673.

== Transport ==
Kexbrough is served by local and Express buses to Barnsley Interchange via Baurgh Green or Mapplewell as well as longer distance services to Wakefield and Leeds. Bus companies that operate in Kexbrough are Stagecoach and Globe Coaches. Bus routes are 93,93a,95,95a,96,96a and X10. The nearest railway station is Darton railway station on the Hallam Line. Kexbrough lies directly to the west of Darton and is connected by the A637 road, to the M1 at Junction 38.

== Education ==
Kexbrough has two schools, Darton Academy, and Kexborough Primary School.

== See also ==
- Listed buildings in Darton
