= Gladys Morgen =

American politician

Members of the Washington House of Representatives from the 5th district
- In office 1976–???
- Preceded by: Edward T. Luders

Personal details
- Born: North Dakota, U.S.
- Died: January 9, 1990 (aged 73) Tucson, Arizona, U.S.
- Party: Democratic

Gladys Morgen (died January 9, 1990) was an American politician. A member of the Democratic Party, she served in the Washington House of Representatives.

== Life and career ==
Morgen was born in North Dakota. She was a housewife.

In 1976, Morgen was appointed by Spokane County commissioners to represent the 5th district of the Washington House of Representatives, following the resignation of Edward T. Luders.

Morgen died in January 1990 in Tucson, Arizona, at the age of 73.
