= Darton (surname) =

Darton is a surname. Notable people with the surname include:

- F. J. Harvey Darton (1878–1936), Historian, biographer and critic
- Nelson Horatio Darton (1865–1948), American geologist
- Richard Darton (born 1948), British engineer and scientist
- Scott Darton (born 1975), English soccer player
- William Darton (1755–1819), English book publisher

== See also ==
- Darton (disambiguation)
- Danton (name)
