= Shirley Rector =

Washington State politician

Member of the Washington House of Representatives from the 5th district
- In office January 9, 1989 – January 14, 1991
- Preceded by: Gary Bumgarner
- Succeeded by: Todd Mielke

Personal details
- Born: 1951 Arizona, U.S.
- Died: January 17, 2004 (aged 52–53) Spokane, Washington, U.S.
- Party: Democratic

Shirley Rector (1951 – 2004) was an American politician who served as a member of the Washington House of Representatives for one term from 1989 to 1991. She represented Washington's 5th legislative district as a Democrat. In party leadership, she was vice chair of the state Democratic Central Committee. She died in Spokane in 2004.
