= Edward J. Reilly =

American politician

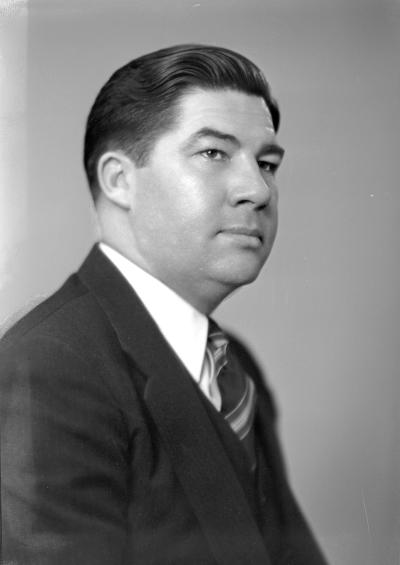
- Reilly in 1937

24th and 26th Speaker of the Washington House of Representatives
- In office January 13, 1941 – January 8, 1945
- Preceded by: John N. Sylvester
- Succeeded by: George F. Yantis
- In office January 11, 1937 – January 9, 1939
- Preceded by: Robert F. Waldron
- Succeeded by: John N. Sylvester

Member of the Washington House of Representatives for the 7th district
- In office 1935–1945; 1953–1955

Personal details
- Born: August 2, 1905 Iowa, United States
- Died: July 16, 1953 (aged 47) Washington, United States
- Party: Democratic

Edward J. Reilly (August 2, 1905 – July 16, 1953) was an American politician in the state of Washington. He served in the Washington House of Representatives from 1935 to 1945 and 1953 to 1955. He was Speaker of the House from 1937 to 1939 and 1941 to 1945.
