= All Saints Church, Darton =

Church in Darton, South Yorkshire, England

All Saints' Church, Darton
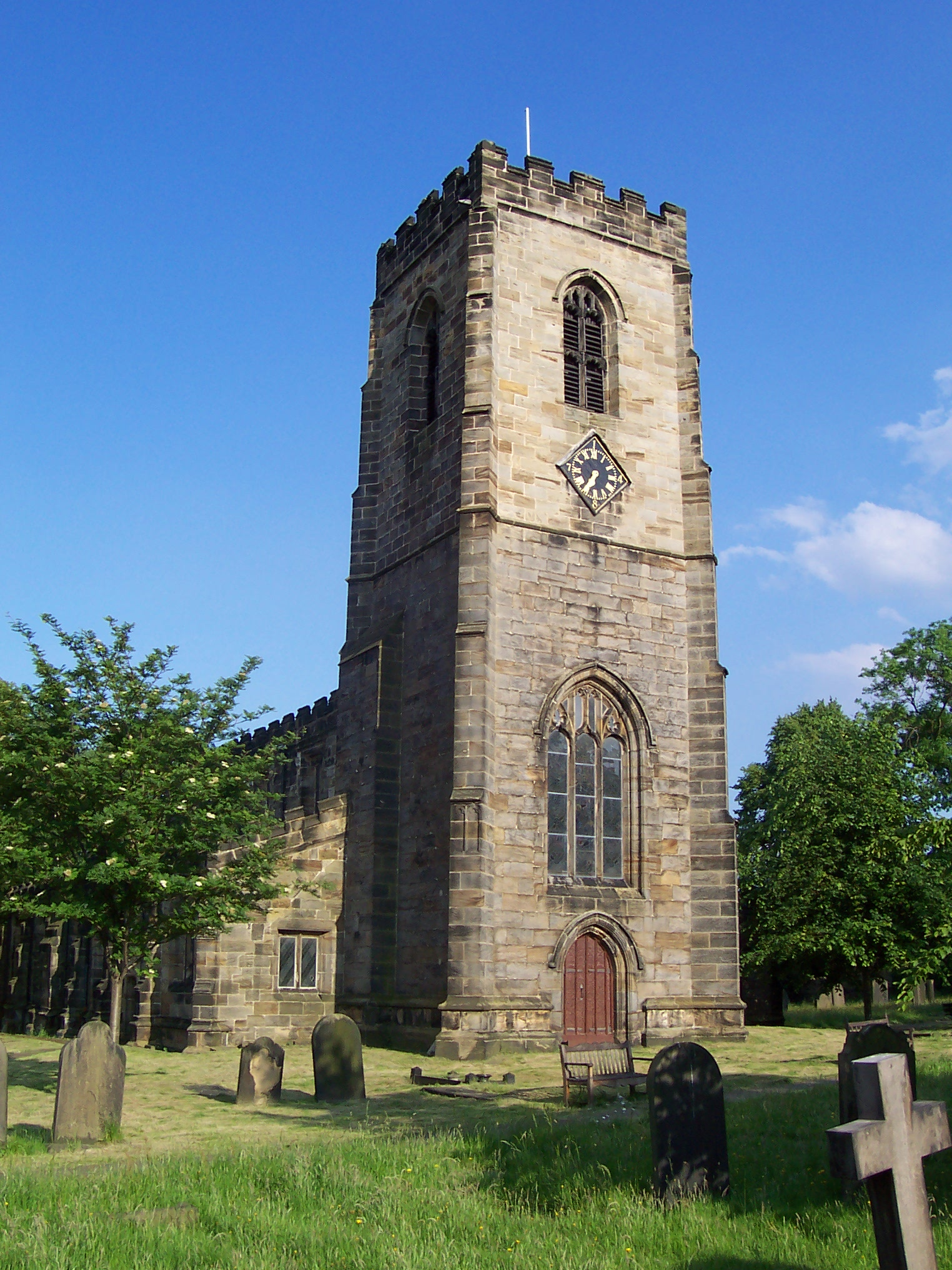
- All Saints' Church, Darton
- 53.585°N 1.5325°W
- OS grid reference: SE 31110 09915
- Location: Darton
- Country: England
- Denomination: Church of England
- Churchmanship: Broad church

Administration
- Province: York
- Diocese: Leeds
- Archdeaconry: Pontefract
- Deanery: Barnsley
- Parish: Darton

Clergy
- Vicar: Fr Paul Mellars

The Church of All Saints is the parish church in the village of Darton in South Yorkshire, England. It is a Church of England church in the Diocese of Leeds. The 16th-century building is Grade I listed and was built on the site of an earlier church. 1150 Is the earliest record of a church being on the site.

== History ==
The villages of Darton and Kexbrough actually appear in the Domesday Book in 1086 (Dertune and Chizeburg) but the earliest record of the church appears in 1150. The Norman church was built by John de Laci, Earl of Lincoln and Sir John de Sothill, feudal lords of the Manor of Darton.

The patronage of the church remained In the hands of the de Laci family and passed from them to the King, as Duke of Lancaster. It remained in royal hands until the reign of Richard III, who in 1483 granted the living of Darton to the Friars of the Priory of St Mary Magdalene at Monk Bretton in exchange for the Forest of Halcombe in Lancashire. This grant to the Friars seemed to have been ignored by the Act of Resumption passed on the accession of Henry VII in 1485, who for some time kept both the forest and the living. After a petition to Parliament, presenting the facts, the living was restored to the Friars.

Shortly afterwards, the Friars began a major building project, to replace the Norman church with a much larger building, fashioned in the perpendicular architectural style,- completed in 1517. (It has been said that the original church was damaged by fire,- hence the need to rebuild, but there is as yet no evidence to support that.) But the church had to be enlarged to accommodate the growing population. During the reconstruction, the Friars may have recycled gravestones from the churchyard to use as building material, because there are at least twelve visible cross slabs built into the construction of the walls in different parts of the building apart from ones recycled in the flooring. (Two original cross slabs may be seen in situ used to cap tombs in both the Beaumont and Silvester Chapels.)

The parish of Darton originally extended much further south towards Barnsley and east to include the parishes of Barugh, Gawber, Kexbrough, Mapplewell and Staincross. All Saints’ Church was the pivotal centre of worship which served this important parish for over 800 years. (Gawber became a separate parish in 1848 and Staincross and Mapplewell in 1930)

Very little evidence of the original church exists, apart from a section inside the church, in the north-west corner, where a profile of the sloping roof of what was an anchorite cell is visible in the west wall.. This would have been a single storey lean-to building attached to the church, possibly with access to the church. It is difficult to appreciate that the hermits (anchorites or anchoresses -and they were mainly ladies ) were holed up inside this small building for the remainder of their lives, 'anchored' to serve the church.

In front of the modern kitchen, the base of the church's original Norman font may be seen. The actual font was donated to the new St Thomas’ Church Gawber, and the following record appears in the Baptism Records at St Thomas’ Church dated 30 November 1877:

'The old font which used to stand in the Mother Church of Darton was this day brought to Gawber having been given to the Daughter Church by the following:

The Rev Charles Sangster, Vicar of Darton

Churchwardens

Mr Richard Francis Braithwaite

Mr Joseph Fountain

Mr Joseph Walker

Signed by J S Metcalfe Vicar of Gawber’

St Thomas’ parish later raised sufficient funds to buy their own new font and old Norman font was placed in the churchyard, from where it was later stolen.

Further along the north wall towards the chancel, there are steps which originally would have led to a rood screen, pre-Reformation. During school visits the steps are a major attraction, when the children usually want to climb the steps to suddenly appear looking into the church, where the rood screen would have appeared, separating the nave from the chancel.

The chapel on the north side of the altar is the Beaumont Chapel, often called the Lady Chapel which contains several memorials to the Beaumont family. The marble memorial is set against the blocked up east window in the chapel, a large tablet surmounted by the arms and crest of the family. At the base is the figure of a chubby child, leaning with an elbow on an hourglass, and looking quite sad.

Underneath the altar in front of the memorial are five grave slabs (currently beneath the floorboards and hopefully to be exposed under re-ordering plans) which commemorate several members of the family. The earliest is dated 1646. The grave slabs are significant in that two of the full length memorials are made of cast iron. They are very, very rare and in a minority when researching cast iron seventeenth century grave memorials in the UK. They are in excellent condition, and exposing them will make them available for future researchers and visitors to appreciate their artistic and technological merits.

The beautiful stained glass window in the chapel is the oldest in the church. It aptly depicts Mary Magdalene, donated by Prior Thomas Tykyll, of the Priory of St Mary Magdalene at Monk Bretton. The window was originally sited in the east window, but was replaced by a memorial window in memory of Joseph Fountain. The sixteenth century dedication was damaged and lost during the operation but the translation originally read:

'Pray for the good estate of Thomas Tykyll, Prior of Monk Bretton Patron of this church, who caused this window to be made in the year Of our Lord 1526.'

Closer examination of the window depicts five small crosses etched into the stained glass, representing the Five Wounds of Christ.

The eleventh century altar has an interesting history. It is now placed in its original position, but that has not always been the case. During the Reformation stone altars were deemed to be unacceptable because they symbolised pagan worship and sacrifice. For that very reason it was thrown out and replaced by a wooden table. This was a time when paintings, frescoes, statues, rood screens, stained glass windows and altars were destroyed. Thankfully All Saints' Church altar was not destroyed, but in 1924, Rev. Harold F Helgood, to satisfy his curiosity about a stone in the churchyard path, decided to raise the stone and turn it over and was amazed to rediscover the eleventh century Norman altar displaced during the Reformation.

Again, on closer inspection, there are five crosses chiselled into the surface, to represent the Five Wounds of Christ.

The chapel to the south of the chancel is the John Silvester Chapel. This very impressive marble monument is set against the east wall of the chapel in front of another blocked up east window. Standing on what appears to be a high rostrum or plinth is a stately figure of a man, flanked by two seated ladies. One lady is seen to be comforting three children, and the other appears to be holding a glove.

Most imps found in churches and cathedrals are usually hidden away in the architecture of the building. The All Saints’ Church or Darton imp is carved on a pier between the nave and the south aisle approximately fifteen feet high-up, in full view.

The Darton imp is an odd looking character and may best be described as a grotesquely carved face in profile, but all is not as it seems. You get a strong impression that the monks who built this phase of the church are having a joke at our expense. Prior Tykyll would certainly have been in on the joke directed towards the congregation. From its high position, high up on the arch, the imp is in a position to cast its eye on every single person in church. It has a glaring and foreboding eye obviously designed to frighten members of the congregation, with an all-seeing all-knowing expression. Similarly its open mouthed shouting appearance may be interpreted as hurling abuse at an unsuspecting audience.

The Tower stands to an approximate height of 80 feet. The monks originally added four pinnacles, but as a result of weathering over the years, they were deemed to be unsafe and dangerous and had to be removed. The 62 steps to the bell chamber are quite challenging, but it is not possible at present for visitors to enjoy from outside the commanding view of the village and beyond. The tower was the first part of the reconstruction when Prior Tykyll decided to rebuild and enlarge the Norman church. This is evidenced inside the church where one of the four angled buttresses had to be 'adjusted' in order to bond with the nave.

The elderly oak bell frame installed in 1759, which housed six Whitechapel bells, had seriously deteriorated by 1960 and was replaced with a modern steel frame in 1998–99. This frame should remain secure and safe for years to come.

The friars who completed this building in 1517, and the prior who donated the Mary Magdalene stained glass window in 1526, all became redundant twelve years later, when on 21 November 1538 Henry VIII's commissioners dissolved the Priory of Monk Bretton.

=== Theft ===
In 2015, the church was subject of a criminal investigation. The vicar of the church between 2007 and 2013 was accused of stealing £24,000 from the church by personally taking monies that were paid as part of Church of England wedding and funeral fees. The vicar was found guilty but absconded to Germany before sentencing, eventually handing himself in. He was subsequently sentenced to 2 years and 8 months in prison.

== See also ==
- Grade I listed buildings in South Yorkshire
- Listed buildings in Darton
