= John Silvester =

John Silvester may refer to:

- John Silvester (writer), Australian journalist and crime writer
- John Silvester (blacksmith) (1652–1722), English blacksmith at the Tower of London
- John Silvester (lawyer) (1745–1822), English lawyer and Common Serjeant of London from 1790 to 1803

== See also ==
- John Sylvester (disambiguation)
