= Ed Davis (politician) =

American politician (1890–1956)

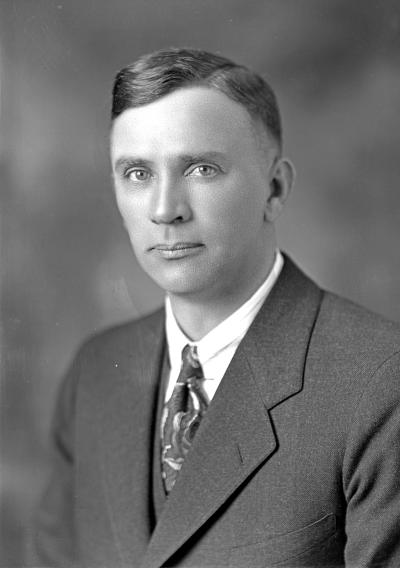
- Davis pictured c. 1925–27

20th Speaker of the Washington House of Representatives
- In office January 14, 1929 – January 12, 1931
- Preceded by: Ralph R. Knapp
- Succeeded by: Edwin J. Templeton

Member of the Washington House of Representatives for the 11th district
- In office 1925–1933

Personal details
- Born: August 31, 1890 Corydon, Iowa, United States
- Died: November 26, 1956 (aged 66) Washington, United States
- Party: Republican

Ed Davis (August 31, 1890 – November 26, 1956) was an American politician in the state of Washington. He served in the Washington House of Representatives from 1917 to 1933. He was Speaker of the House from 1929 to 1931.
