= George F. Yantis =

American politician (1885–1947)

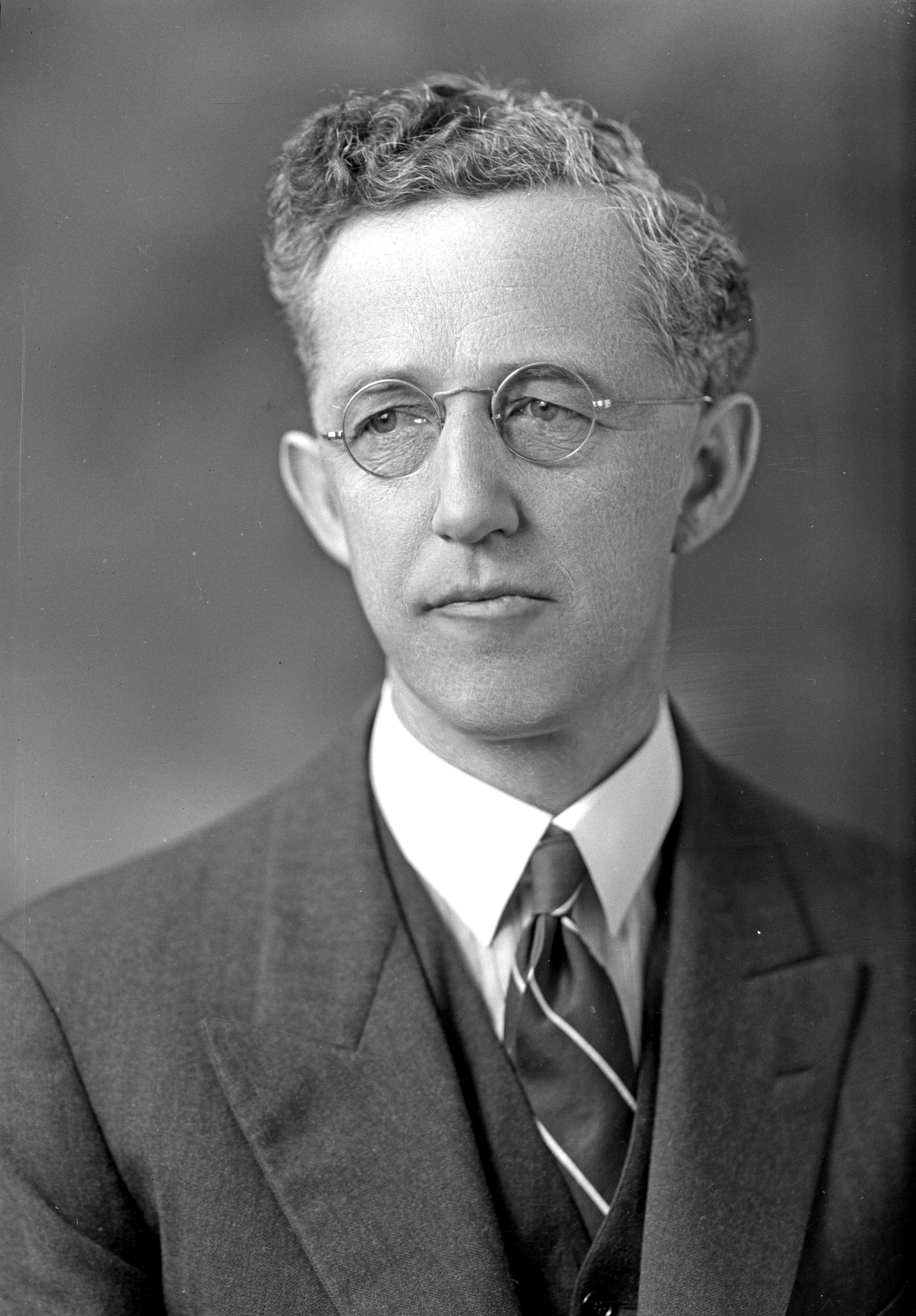
- Yantis in 1931

22nd and 27th Speaker of the Washington House of Representatives
- In office January 8, 1945 – January 13, 1947
- Preceded by: Edward J. Reilly
- Succeeded by: Herbert M. Hamblen
- In office January 9, 1933 – January 14, 1935
- Preceded by: Edwin J. Templeton
- Succeeded by: Robert F. Waldron

Member of the Washington House of Representatives for the 28th district
- In office 1931–1933

Member of the Washington House of Representatives for the 22nd district
- In office 1933–1939; 1945–1949

Personal details
- Born: October 28, 1885 Olympia, Washington, U.S.
- Died: December 28, 1947 (aged 62) Seattle, Washington, U.S.
- Party: Democratic

George F. Yantis (October 28, 1885 – December 28, 1947) was an American politician in the state of Washington. He served in the Washington House of Representatives. He served as Speaker from 1933 to 1935 and from 1945 to 1947.
