= W. C. Belknap =

American politician

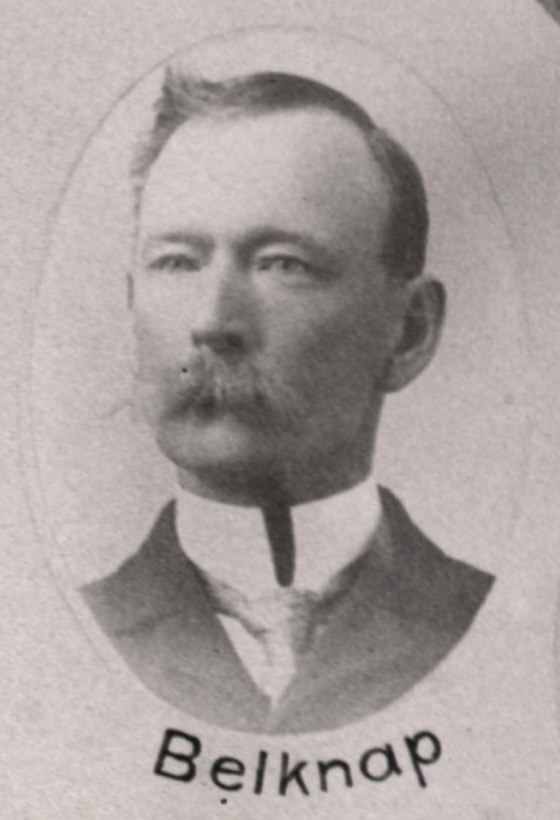
- Belknap in 1895

Member of the Washington Senate from the 5th district
- In office January 9, 1893 – January 11, 1897
- Preceded by: Alexander Watt
- Succeeded by: W. E. Runner

Personal details
- Born: Webster Clark Belknap; November 29, 1850 Benton County, Oregon, U.S.
- Died: December 23, 1937 (aged 87) Portland, Oregon, U.S.
- Party: Republican

Webster Clark Belknap (November 29, 1850 – December 23, 1937) was an American politician in the state of Washington. He served in the Washington State Senate from 1893 to 1897.
