= John N. Sylvester =

American politician

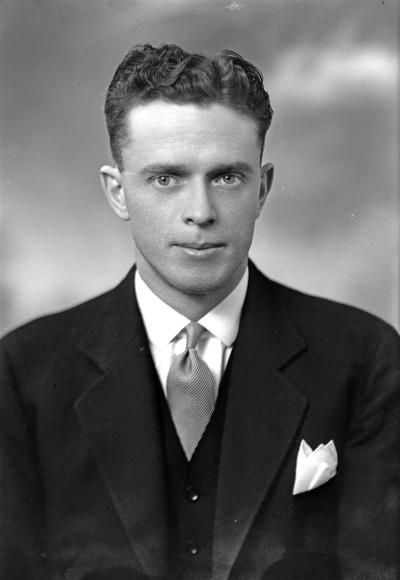
- Sylvester in 1937

25th Speaker of the Washington House of Representatives
- In office January 9, 1939 – January 13, 1941
- Preceded by: Edward J. Reilly
- Succeeded by: Edward J. Reilly

Member of the Washington House of Representatives for the 37th district
- In office 1937–1941

Personal details
- Born: June 8, 1909 Pasco, Washington, United States
- Died: February 1, 1993 (aged 83) Washington, United States
- Party: Democratic

John Nixon Sylvester (June 8, 1909 – February 1, 1993) was an American politician in the state of Washington. He served in the Washington House of Representatives from 1937 to 1941. He was Speaker of the House from 1939 to 1941.
