= W. E. Runner =

American politician

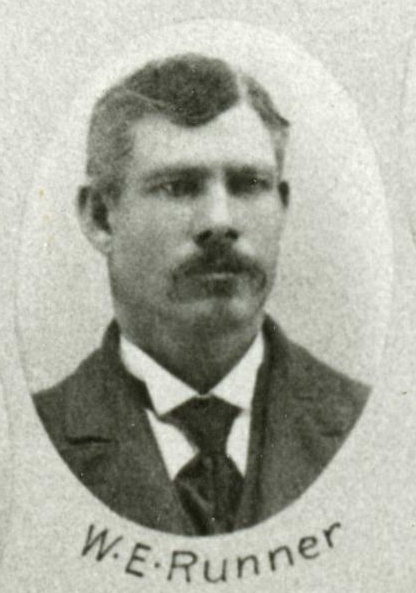
- Runner in 1895

Member of the Washington Senate from the 5th district
- In office January 11, 1897 – January 14, 1901
- Preceded by: W. C. Belknap
- Succeeded by: Stanley Hallett

Member of the Washington House of Representatives from the 5th district
- In office January 14, 1895 – January 11, 1897
- Preceded by: R. D. Speck
- Succeeded by: C. E. Mohundro

Personal details
- Born: March 16, 1851 Indianapolis, Indiana, U.S.
- Died: September 24, 1931 (aged 80) Spokane, Washington, U.S.
- Party: Populist

William E. Runner (March 16, 1851 – September 24, 1931) was an American politician in the state of Washington. He served in the Washington House of Representatives (1895 to 1897, with R. K. Kegley) and Washington State Senate.
