= Russell Hoopingarner =

American politician (1894–1964)

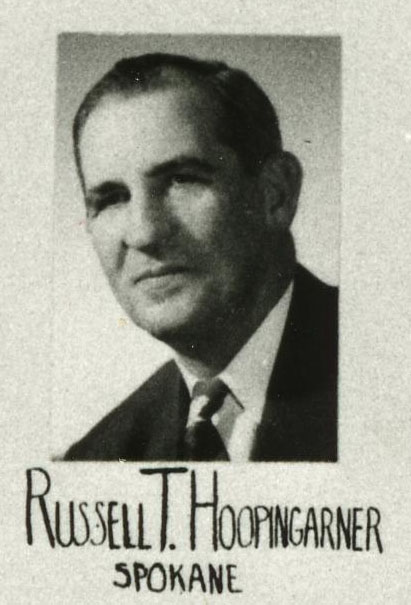
- 1949

Member of the Washington House of Representatives for the 5th district
- In office 1949–1953

Personal details
- Born: October 5, 1892 Plainville, Indiana, United States
- Died: August 1964 (aged 71) Washington, United States
- Party: Democratic

Russell Trueblood Hoopingarner (October 5, 1892 – August 1964) was an American politician in the state of Washington. He served in the Washington House of Representatives from 1949 to 1953.
