= R. K. Kegley =

American politician

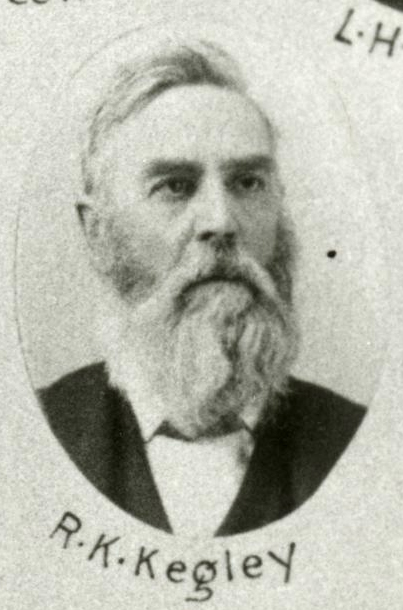
- Kegley in 1895

Member of the Washington House of Representatives for the 5th district
- In office 1893–1897

Personal details
- Born: May 21, 1828 Greene County, Pennsylvania, United States
- Died: March 12, 1903 (aged 74) Spokane County, Washington, United States
- Party: Populist

Rufus K. Kegley (May 21, 1828 – March 12, 1903) was an American politician in the state of Washington. He served in the Washington House of Representatives from 1895 to 1897, alongside W. E. Runner.
