= Jill Scott (racing driver) =

British racing driver and aviator

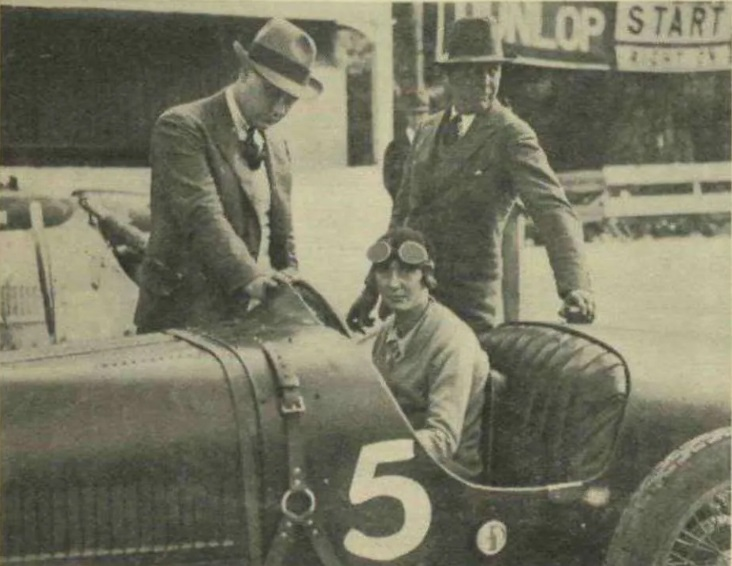
Scott driving a Bugatti in 1926

Jill Scott (21 May 1903 – 1974) was a British racing driver and aviator. She was described as "swashbuckling" and was a distinctive figure in motor racing, dressed in cherry-red from head-to-toe whenever she appeared at the race track.

== Early life ==
She was born Eileen May Fountain on 21 May 1903 at Birthwaite Hall in Darton, near Barnsley, Yorkshire, to Minnie Eveline (née Longley) and Joseph Fountain, a family made wealthy from their coal businesses.

== Racing career ==
Along with her first husband, William Berkeley "Bummer" Scott, she lived in a large house Grasmere, in Old Byfleet near the Brooklands race track in Surrey, England, and the couple were early and enthusiastic collectors of automobiles. They bought their first Sunbeam Indianapolis shortly after their marriage and quickly added several Bugattis to their collection. Their cars all wore a distinctive black livery with emerald green wheels, and the couple collected frequent trophies racing their Bugattis at the nearby track. Following the death of J. G. Parry-Thomas, they bought two of his cars, one of which, the 2-litre 1924-type Grand Prix Sunbeam, Scott used to exceed 120 miles-per-hour on the Brooklands track, (a lap at 120.88 m.p.h.) in September 1928. She was the woman to do so and earned the right to display a coveted British Automobile Racing Club badge acknowledging the achievement. In 1928 she became the first woman elected to the British Racing Drivers' Club.

She earned her pilot's licence (No. 8554) on 16 April 1929 in an Avro Avian Cirrus II at Brooklands School of Flying. Her 1938 portrait by Yevonde is on display at the National Portrait Gallery.

== Personal life ==
Jill and William Scott married on 21 November 1925 and had a daughter, Sheila, who attended boarding schools and Cheltenham Ladies' College, and then Cambridge University.

In 1930 she divorced William and married another driver, Ernest Mortimer Thomas, who was also a former RAF pilot. They had raced together previously. Scott herself had learned to fly a few years earlier, and operated an Avro Avian. She and her new husband continued to race at Brooklands for many years, her in an Alfa Romeo and him in a Frazer Nash.

Scott died in 1974. Thomas died a few months later.
