= Peter Silvester =

Peter Silvester may refer to:

- Peter Silvester (1734–1808), U.S. Representative from New York
- Peter H. Silvester (1807–1882), his grandson, U.S. Representative from New York
- Peter Silvester (footballer) (born 1948), retired English footballer
- Peter P. Silvester (1935–1996), electrical engineer

== See also ==
- Peter Sylvester (1937–2007), German painter and graphic artist
