= Floyd B. Danskin =

American politician (1889–1971)

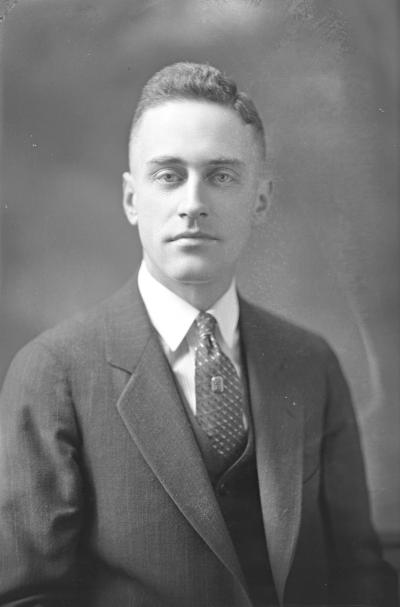
- Danskin in 1925

18th Speaker of the Washington House of Representatives
- In office January 12, 1925 – January 10, 1927
- Preceded by: Mark E. Reed
- Succeeded by: Ralph R. Knapp

Member of the Washington House of Representatives for the 5th district
- In office 1921–1933

Personal details
- Born: May 1, 1889 Aulne, Kansas, United States
- Died: March 31, 1971 (aged 81) Spokane, Washington, United States
- Party: Republican

Floyd B. Danskin (May 1, 1889 – March 31, 1971) was an American politician in the state of Washington. He served in the Washington House of Representatives from 1921 to 1933. He was Speaker of the House from 1925 to 1927.
