= John Silvester (blacksmith) =

John Silvester (1652 – 5 May 1722) held the Lordship of Birthwaite and Kexborough, near Barnsley, then in the West Riding of Yorkshire, which he bought from Sir Francis Burdett in the late 16th or early 17th century. He was responsible for the construction of a school in the village of Kexborough.

He was a blacksmith at the Tower of London and is said to have constructed a chain that was to be drawn across the width of the river Thames in case of invasion, particularly that of an anticipated Dutch Fleet invasion.

A marble effigy sculpted by Peter Scheemake was placed in the South Chapel of Darton Parish Church.
