= W. B. Scott (racing driver) =

Racing driver and squash champion (1904–1981)

- Born: William Berkley Scott; 19 November 1904
- Died: 5 August 1981 (aged 76) Cambridge, England

William Berkley "Bummer" Scott (19 November 1904 – 5 August 1981) was a Grand Prix and sportscar driver, active before the Second World War.

== Early life ==
Scott was from a prominent Scottish family; his father was a judge and the family estate included Calgary Castle. Scott was educated at Fettes College before going up to Pembroke College, Cambridge, and he earned a Cambridge Blue at rugby union by playing in the Varsity match in 1923 and 1924 as a number eight and wing-forward respectively.

== Racing career ==
Scott first raced at Montlhéry in 1924, driving a 750cc Benjamin, and in 1925, he and his wife Jill decided to undertake a motor racing career, moving to Old Byfleet near the Brooklands race track in Surrey, England.

Following the death of J. G. Parry Thomas, the couple bought two cars from the estate; a Leyland Eight (which they painted in black with green wheels, which became the Scotts' signature scheme) for Jill and a Thomas Special Grand Prix car for W.B. Scott entered the Thomas for the 1927 British Grand Prix, albeit this had to be in green for the international event; his appearance was not a success, as he retired early. The 6'1" Scott found it difficult to fit in the low-slung car and only had a few races in it before selling it. The pair shared a 4.5-litre Le Mans-spec Bentley at the 1929 Double Twelve Hours race, finishing 11th on handicap, but having covered the third-highest distance. The Bentley did the couple sterling service, never retiring from a race, and capable of being driven to and from each of its races.

His wealth helped him to buy a series of cars, including a 1924 Grand Prix Sunbeam, and a 1927 Grand Prix Delage from Malcolm Campbell which Scott sold to Earl Howe in 1932. Scott tried the Delage in the 1929 International 500 Miles Race with the Hon. Brian Lewis as co-driver, but the car retired with water temperature problems. Scott had more success in the 1930 Gold Star race, beating Campbell to the line, but being briefly disqualified for going off-line; Tim Birkin testified that this was because Scott had moved over to give Birkin's wayward Blower Bentley extra room, and Scott was re-instated.

The Delage had a promising run in the 1930 500 Miles race, stymied by front axle bolts shearing, and that encouraged Scott to enter the 1931 French Grand Prix (then run under a 10-hour quasi-sportscar formula), with Sydenham Armstrong-Payn as co-driver; Scott stalled at the start and Armstrong-Payn later suffered a broken axle.

== Squash career ==
Scott's last racing activities were in 1931, and he became Scottish squash champion in 1937. He remained successful in squash after the Second World War, holding the British doubles titles with Roy McElvie as late as 1948, although in part that was due to a lack of opportunities for challengers, with squash courts having been destroyed.

== Personal life ==
Scott married Jill married on 21 November 1925. They had a daughter, Sheila, who attended boarding schools and Cheltenham Ladies' College, and then Cambridge University. In 1930 they divorced.

== Nickname ==
Although contemporary reports usually referred to him as W. B. Scott (in common with the convention that racing drivers were identified by initials and surname), he was occasionally referred to as "Bummer" (or, more rarely, "Bomber"), taken from his uncle, the 1900s Scottish rugby international William Patrick Scott, who was also nicknamed Bummer. His nickname was also put down to his "bombing" squash-playing style, his considerable 17 stone weight giving extra emphasis to his shots.

== European Championship results ==
(key) (Races in bold indicate pole position)

Year	Entrant	Make	1	2	3	Pos.	Points
1931	private	Delage	ITA	FRA; Ret †	BEL	29	23
† Scott shared a car with Sydenham Armstrong-Payn.
