= Robert F. Waldron =

American politician (1903–1952)

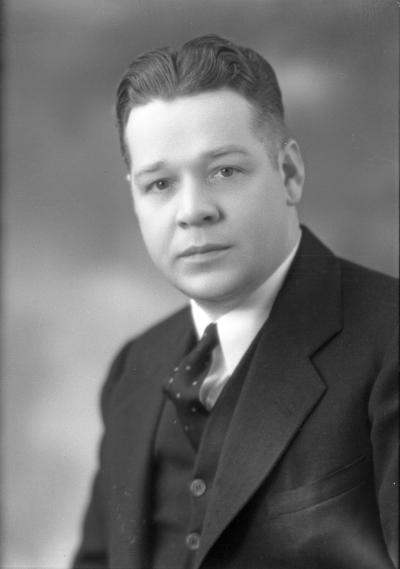
- Waldron in 1933

23rd Speaker of the Washington House of Representatives
- In office January 14, 1935 – January 11, 1937
- Preceded by: George F. Yantis
- Succeeded by: Edward J. Reilly

Member of the Washington House of Representatives for the 3rd district
- In office 1933–1939; 1945–1947

Personal details
- Born: January 4, 1903 Spokane, Washington, United States
- Died: November 25, 1952 (aged 49) Olympia, Washington, United States
- Party: Democratic

Robert Francis Waldron (January 4, 1903 – November 25, 1952) was an American politician in the state of Washington. He served in the Washington House of Representatives from 1933 to 1939 and 1945 to 1947. He was Speaker of the House from 1935 to 1937.
