= Attila Silvester =

Greek dancer, choreographer and director (1944–2010)

Attila - Akyla Silvester
- Born: 30 July 1944 (age 81); Budapest, Hungary
- Occupation: Choreographer - Director

Attila-Akyla Silvester (30 July 1944 – 22 February 2010) was a famous Greek dancer, choreographer and director. He is most famous for the ballet presentations of Orpheus, La Fille Mal Gardée and Zorba the Greek.

== Biography ==
=== Choreography career ===
Attila Silvester began his choreography career by joining the Greek National Opera House in Athens as a lead dancer. Concurrently, he presented choreographies for Prokofiev's Romeo and Juliet, Mussorgsky's Night on Bald Mountain and Drigo's Le Corsaire - Pas de deux. Some of the collaborations he has done, are with famous ballet dancers such as Vladimir Vasiliev, Rudolf Nureyev, Ekaterina Maximova and Carla Fracci.

He is well known for a number of choreographies, such as: Vivaldi "Le quattro stagioni", Schubert's "Der Tod und das Mädchen". Ommagio ad Albinoni, Adam's "Giselle", Nutcracker and Swan Lake, Léo Delibes's "Coppelia", Herold and John Lanchbery's "La Fille Mal Gardée (for which he received an award for the best choreography), Rimsky Korsakov's Scheherazade, Berlioz Symphonie fantastique, Scriabin's "Third Symphony", Ludwig Minkus's "Don Quijote" and "La Bayadère", Aram Khachaturian's "Gayane", Nikolai Schedrin's "Carmen", Manos Hatzidakis's "Gioconda's Smile".

Atilla Silvester has also worked as a teacher for a number of institutions: Astaldi(Rome), Pecs (Hungary), Roma Ballet, Compagnia Nazionale Italiana danza Classica (Rome), Fondazzione Piccini (Rome), Teatro Petruzzeli (Bari), Astra Ballet (Rome), and R.Higtawer (Cannes).

In 2001, he was employed by Constanţa's State Opera House in Romania, as a director for Mikis Theodorakis's "The Dead Brother's Song" and in 2003, in the same stage, he presented the ballet "La Fille Mal Gardée" and in 2005, Nikos Kazantzakis's "Zorba the Greek". In 2007, Attila-Akyla Silvester presented the ballet Orpheus, with Teatrul de opera si balet "Oleg Danovsky" at Constanţa, in a world premiere. In 2008, he directed the ballet "Ciuleandra" by Liviu Rebreanu.
