= Darton =

Village in South Yorkshire, England

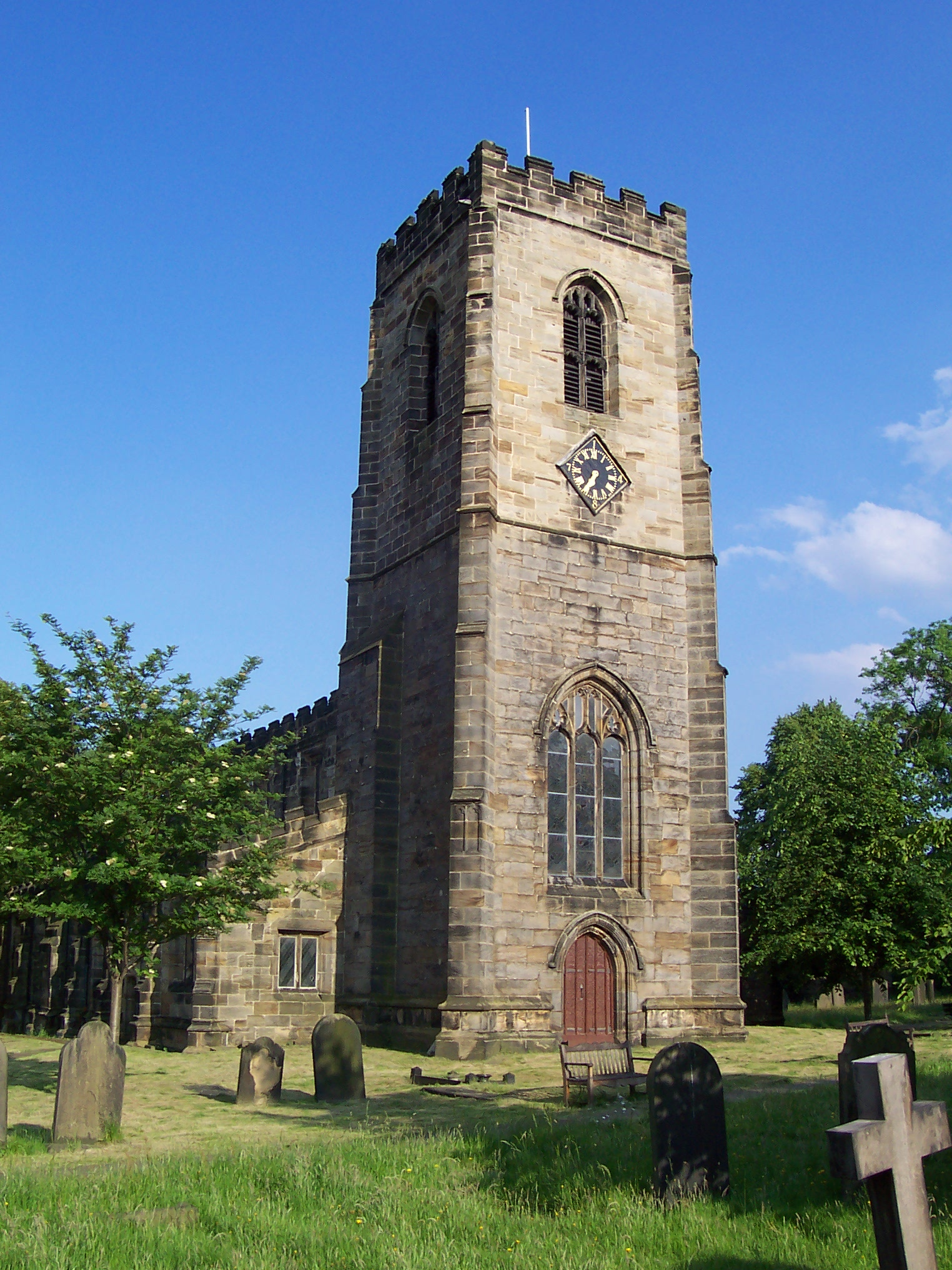
- All Saints Church, Darton

- Location within South Yorkshire
- Population: 21,345 (Wards. Darton East + Darton West. 2011)
- OS grid reference: SE309099
- Metropolitan borough: Barnsley
- Metropolitan county: South Yorkshire
- Region: Yorkshire and the Humber
- Country: England
- Sovereign state: United Kingdom
- Post town: BARNSLEY
- Postcode district: S75
- Dialling code: 01226
- Police: South Yorkshire
- Fire: South Yorkshire
- Ambulance: Yorkshire
- UK Parliament: Barnsley North

Darton is a large village in the Metropolitan Borough of Barnsley (part of South Yorkshire), on the border with West Yorkshire, England. At the time of the 2001 UK census, it had a population of 14,927, increasing to 21,345 for both Darton Wards (East & West) at the 2011 Census.

== Geography ==
Darton lies on the River Dearne, directly to the east of Kexbrough, and is situated about 1 mile (1.6 km) west of Mapplewell, 5 miles (8 km) north of Barnsley, 9 miles (14 km) south-west of Wakefield, 14 miles (23 km) south-east of Huddersfield, 19 miles (31 km) south of Leeds, and 21 miles (34 km) north of Sheffield. It is served by the A637 road and is bisected by the M1 motorway (junction 38 being a mile to the north). Its location is approximately 53°35′6″N 1°31′57″W, at an elevation of around 260 feet (79 m) above mean sea level.

== History ==
The name Darton is believed to be an amalgamation of "Dearne" and the Anglo-Saxon word "ton" (meaning 'town'). Hence, in ancient times it was known as 'the town on the Dearne'. However, other sources dispute this explanation and claim that the name originates from a description given to a deer enclosure or something similar. In 1086 the hamlet of Dertone was in the wapentake of Staincross.

The hamlet grew to become a village so the Parish of Darton was founded in 1150, when the first church was built. As elsewhere in England, an official register of baptisms, deaths and marriages did not begin until later, in 1539. The parish was historically within the West Riding of Yorkshire and became a part of the former county of South Yorkshire upon its creation in 1974.

== Present day ==
Darton has its own railway station on Northern's Hallam Line which links train journeys between Sheffield and Leeds. The railway station is in South Yorkshire but West Yorkshire Metro tickets are also valid to and from this station. The reason for this is because the West-South Yorkshire boundary ran between the village and its main source of employment, Woolley Colliery.

On 15 June 2007, Darton hit the national headlines after 48 hours of torrential rain caused the River Dearne to burst its banks leading to heavy flooding in the village. The main road through the village was rendered impassable and many homes and businesses were damaged, including the village post office, which re-opened in June 2008. Further flooding occurred in January 2008, although the damage and disruption caused this time was not as bad as the previous year's.

== Education ==
Darton has its own primary school and a secondary school called Darton Academy actually in Kexborough which opened in 2011. The new building (and rebranded school) replaced Darton High School -previously Darton Hall Senior School - that had been on the site since 1957.

== Sport ==
- Darton cricket club plays in the Pontefract and District Cricket League.
- North Gawber Colliery F.C. are based in the village and play in the Sheffield and Hallamshire County Senior League Premier Division.

== Notable people ==
- David Booth — manager of Laos national football team
- Thomas Brackin — English first-class cricketer
- Ian Butler — English professional footballer
- Michael Clapham — Labour Party politician
- Jack Grainger — English professional footballer
- Ken Knighton — professional footballer, former manager of Sunderland and Orient
- Alan Ogley — professional goalkeeper
- Jill Scott — racing driver and aviator
- Alban Turner — English first-class cricketer
- Anna Cotton — nonconformist ironmaster
- John Braine — author

== See also ==
- Listed buildings in Darton
