= Darton Academy =

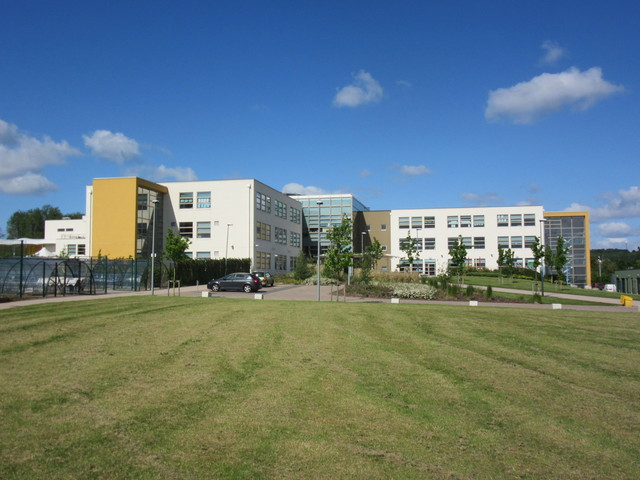

Location
- Ballfield Lane; Darton; Barnsley, South Yorkshire, S75 5EF; England; 53.58360°N 1.55317°W

Information
- Type: Academy
- Established: 1935
- Local authority: Barnsley
- Trust: Delta Academies Trust
- Department for Education URN: 146320 Tables
- Ofsted: Reports
- Principal: Joe Spencer
- Staff: 130
- Gender: Coeducational
- Age: 11 to 16
- Enrolment: 1,200+
- Colours: Black, Blue
- Website: https://www.dartonacademy.org.uk/

Darton Academy is a coeducational secondary school located in Darton in the Metropolitan Borough of Barnsley, South Yorkshire, England. The school provides education for more than 1,200 pupils in Years 7 to 11.

The school is located to the north west of Barnsley in the village of Kexbrough on the edge of the open countryside approximately one mile from junction 38 of the M1 motorway.

== History ==
Darton Hall Senior School was opened in the village of Darton in 1935, providing senior education for 560 pupils of both sexes. In 1957, buildings were opened at the current Kexborough site, which then became the boys' campus, with girls remaining at Darton.

In the 1970s, preparations for the changes to comprehensive education in the area, combined with the raising of the school leaving age led to considerable developments at the Kexborough campus. By this time, the school catered for 11 pupils, with the first two years being spent at Darton, before moving to Kexborough.

Since 2005, the school has been a specialist humanities school. It continues to provide a full curriculum in accordance with the National Curriculum for all pupils.

In January 2010 Darton College was inspected by Ofsted, who rated the school Grade 4 (inadequate) overall and placed it into Special Measures.

A new building opened in February 2011, as part of the government's Building Schools for the Future programme, and the school was renamed Darton College.

An Ofsted inspection in June 2013 judged the school to be Grade 2 (good).

Previously a community school administered by Barnsley Metropolitan Borough Council, in October 2018 Darton College converted to academy status and was renamed Darton Academy. The school is now sponsored by the Delta Academies Trust.
