= Washington's 6th legislative district =

American legislative district

Washington 6th legislative district map

Washington's 6th legislative district is one of forty-nine districts in Washington state for representation in the state legislature. The district is entirely within Spokane County. The district includes part or all of the cities of Airway Heights, Medical Lake, and Spokane. It was most recently redrawn by the 2021 Washington State Redistricting Commission.

The district is represented by state senator Jeff Holy (R) and state representatives Mike Volz (R; position 1), and Jenny Graham (R; position 2).

== Past legislators ==
=== Statehood-1932 ===
During this period, the state senate and state house districts were geographically distinct.

Year	Senate		House		
Year	Senator	Senate District Geography	House Position 1	House Position 2	House District Geography
1st (1889-1890)	C. G. Austin (R)	Asotin and Garfield Counties			
2nd (1891-1892)	R. C. McCroskey (D)	Whitman County (part)	House District Established		Whitman County (part)
2nd (1891-1892)	R. C. McCroskey (D)	Whitman County (part)	F. L. Moore (D)	D. M. Holt (D)	Whitman County (part)
3rd (1893-1894)	R. C. McCroskey (D)	Whitman County (part)	D. F. Anderson (R)	Thomas G. Mulkey (D)	Whitman County (part)
4th (1895-1896)	L. C. Crow (P.P.)	Whitman County (part)	Neal Cheetham (P.P.)	Cleveland Smith (P.P.), (Pop.) (Note: Switched from P.P. to Pop. for the 1896 election and the following session)	Whitman County (part)
5th (1897-1898)	L. C. Crow (P.P.)	Whitman County (part)	H. D. Smith (Pop.)	Cleveland Smith (P.P.), (Pop.)	Whitman County (part)
6th (1899-1900)	John H. Carper (Pop.) (Note: Deceased Feb. 27, 1900)	Whitman County (part)	B. F. Totten (R)	J. B. Frick (R)	Whitman County (part)
6th (1899-1900)	L. C. Crow (D) (Note: Elected to serve unexpired term)	Whitman County (part)	B. F. Totten (R)	J. B. Frick (R)	Whitman County (part)
7th (1901-1902)	L. C. Crow (D)	Whitman County (part)	C. W. Waters (D)	T. C. Miles (D)	Whitman County (part)
8th (1903-1904)	Will G. Graves (D)	Spokane County (part)	Joseph B. Lindsley (R)	Dana Child (D)	Spokane County (part)
9th (1905-1906)	Will G. Graves (D)	Spokane County (part)	G. T. Doolittle (R)	Joseph B. Lindsley (R)	Spokane County (part)
10th (1907-1908)	Will G. Graves (D)	Spokane County (part)	L. P. Hornberger (R)	Alexander H. Gregg (R)	Spokane County (part)
11th (1909-1910)	Will G. Graves (D)	Spokane County (part)	James W. McArthur (R)	John Anderson (R)	Spokane County (part)
12th (1911-1912)	George W. Shaefer (R)	Spokane County (part)	Harve H. Phipps (R)	E. H. Eshleman (R)	Spokane County (part)
13th (1913-1914)	George W. Shaefer (R)	Spokane County (part)	Frank W. Middaugh (Prog.)	Max M. Neumann (Prog.)	Spokane County (part)
14th (1915-1916)	Guy B. Groff (R)	Spokane County (part)	Alex M. Winston (R)	John Anderson (R)	Spokane County (part)
15th (1917-1918)	Guy B. Groff (R)	Spokane County (part)	Fred A. Adams (R)	John Anderson (R)	Spokane County (part)
16th (1919-1920)	Guy B. Groff (R)	Spokane County (part)	John Anderson (R)	Fred A. Adams (R) (Note: Elected Speaker of the House)	Spokane County (part)
17th (1921-1922)	Guy B. Groff (R)	Spokane County (part)	W. H. Winfree (R)	John Anderson (R)	Spokane County (part)
18th (1923-1924)	Guy B. Groff (R)	Spokane County (part)	Charles H. Voss (R)	John Anderson (R)	Spokane County (part)
19th (1925-1926)	Guy B. Groff (R)	Spokane County (part)	Charles H. Voss (R)	John Anderson (R)	Spokane County (part)
20th (1927-1928)	Harry L. Williams (R)	Spokane County (part)	John Anderson (R)	Chan Wakefield (R)	Spokane County (part)
21st (1929-1930)	Harry L. Williams (R)	Spokane County (part)	Chan Wakefield (R)	John Anderson (R)	Spokane County (part)
22nd (1931-1932)	Harry L. Williams (R)	Spokane County (part)	John Anderson (R)	W. Storey Buck (R)	Spokane County (part)

=== 1933-Present ===
After the passage of Initiative 57 and the 1930 redistricting cycle, the state senate and state house districts were geographically similar. While some senate districts would occasionally be broken up into house seats A and B, seats A and B were always contained in the Senate district boundaries.

The 2nd Legislative district's state senate and house seats are identical geographically from 1933 to the present day.

Year	Senate	House		District Geography
Year	Senator	House Position 1	House Position 2	District Geography
23rd (1933-1934)	Harry L. Williams (R)	Fred Schade (D)	Will W. Wentworth (D)	Spokane County (part)
24th (1935-1936)	Fred S. Duggan (D)	Lyle D. Keith (D)	Will W. Wentworth (D)	Spokane County (part)
25th (1937-1938)	Fred S. Duggan (D)	Lyle D. Keith (D)	Will W. Wentworth (D)	Spokane County (part)
26th (1939-1940)	Fred S. Duggan (D)	Charles C. Finucane (D)	Will W. Wentworth (D)	Spokane County (part)
27th (1941-1942)	Fred S. Duggan (D)	Duke Taft (R)	Harold Zent (R) (Note: Deceased Aug. 24, 1951)	Spokane County (part)
28th (1943-1944)	Virgil A. Warren (R)	Duke Taft (R)	Harold Zent (R)	Spokane County (part)
29th (1945-1946)	Virgil A. Warren (R)	Duke Taft (R)	Harold Zent (R)	Spokane County (part)
30th (1947-1948)	John H. Happy (R)	Elmer E. Johnston (R)	Harold Zent (R)	Spokane County (part)
31st (1949-1950)	John H. Happy (R)	Elmer E. Johnston (R)	Harold Zent (R)	Spokane County (part)
32nd (1951-1952)	John H. Happy (R)	Elmer E. Johnston (R)	Harold Zent (R)	Spokane County (part)
32nd (1951-1952)	John H. Happy (R)	Elmer E. Johnston (R)	Richard W. Axtell (R) (Note: Appointed to serve 1951 2nd Ex. Session)	Spokane County (part)
33rd (1953-1954)	John H. Happy (R)	Alfred O. Adams (R)	Elmer E. Johnston (R) (Note: Resigned Feb. 14, 1966; Named Chief Examiner of the Transportation & Utility Commission)	Spokane County (part)
34th (1955-1956)	John H. Happy (R)	Alfred O. Adams (R)	Elmer E. Johnston (R)	Spokane County (part)
35th (1957-1958)	John H. Happy (R)	Alfred O. Adams (R)	Elmer E. Johnston (R)	Spokane County (part)
36th (1959-1960)	John H. Happy (R)	Alfred O. Adams (R)	Elmer E. Johnston (R)	Spokane County (part)
37th (1961-1962)	John H. Happy (R)	Alfred O. Adams (R)	Elmer E. Johnston (R)	Spokane County (part)
37th (1961-1962)	Marjorie Happy (R) (Note: Appointed 1962 to serve unexpired term)	Alfred O. Adams (R)	Elmer E. Johnston (R)	Spokane County (part)
38th (1963-1964)	Sam C. Guess (R)	Alfred O. Adams (R)	Elmer E. Johnston (R)	Spokane County (part)
39th (1965-1966)	Sam C. Guess (R)	Alfred O. Adams (R)	Elmer E. Johnston (R)	Spokane County (part)
39th (1965-1966)	Sam C. Guess (R)	Alfred O. Adams (R)	Jerry C. Kopet (R) (Note: Appointed Apr. 18, 1966; Elected Nov. 8, 1966 to serve unexpired term)	Spokane County (part)
40th (1967-1968)	Sam C. Guess (R)	Alfred O. Adams (R)	Jerry C. Kopet (R)	1965 Redistricting
40th (1967-1968)	Sam C. Guess (R)	Alfred O. Adams (R)	Jerry C. Kopet (R)	Spokane County (part)
41st (1969-1970)	Sam C. Guess (R)	Jerry C. Kopet (R)	A. J. Pardini (R)	Spokane County (part)
42nd (1971-1972)	Sam C. Guess (R)	Jerry C. Kopet (R)	A. J. Pardini (R)	Spokane County (part)
43rd (1973-1974)	Sam C. Guess (R)	Jerry C. Kopet (R)	A. J. Pardini (R)	1972 Redistricting
43rd (1973-1974)	Sam C. Guess (R)	Jerry C. Kopet (R)	A. J. Pardini (R)	Spokane County (part)
44th (1975-1976)	Sam C. Guess (R)	A. J. Pardini (R)	Dick Bond (R)	Spokane County (part)
45th (1977-1978)	Sam C. Guess (R)	A. J. Pardini (R)	Dick Bond (R)	Spokane County (part)
46th (1979-1980)	Sam C. Guess (R)	Michael R. McGinnis (R)	Dick Bond (R)	Spokane County (part)
47th (1981-1982)	Sam C. Guess (R)	Michael R. McGinnis (R)	Dick Bond (R)	Spokane County (part)
48th (1983-1984)	Sam C. Guess (R)	James E. West (R)	Dick Bond (R)	Spokane County (part)
49th (1985-1986)	Sam C. Guess (R)	James E. West (R)	Dick Bond (R)	Spokane County (part)
50th (1987-1988)	James E. West (R) (Note: Resigned Dec. 23, 2003; Elected Mayor of Spokane)	Duane Sommers (R)	John A. Moyer (R)	Spokane County (part)
51st (1989-1990)	James E. West (R)	Duane Sommers (R)	John A. Moyer (R)	Spokane County (part)
52nd (1991-1992)	James E. West (R)	Duane Sommers (R)	John A. Moyer (R)	Spokane County (part)
53rd (1993-1994)	James E. West (R)	B. Jean Silver (R)	Todd Mielke (R) (Note: Resigned October 29, 1995)	Spokane County (part)
54th (1995-1996)	James E. West (R)	B. Jean Silver (R)	Todd Mielke (R)	Spokane County (part)
54th (1995-1996)	James E. West (R)	B. Jean Silver (R)	Duane Sommers (R) (Note: Appointed Nov. 14, 1995 to serve unexpired term)	Spokane County (part)
55th (1997-1998)	James E. West (R)	Brad Benson (R)	Duane Sommers (R)	Spokane County (part)
56th (1999-2000)	James E. West (R)	Brad Benson (R)	Duane Sommers (R)	Spokane County (part)
57th (2001-2002)	James E. West (R)	Brad Benson (R)	John Ahern (R)	Spokane County (part)
58th (2003-2004)	James E. West (R)	Brad Benson (R)	John Ahern (R)	Spokane County (part)
58th (2003-2004)	Brian Murray (R) (Note: Appointed December 24, 2003)	Brad Benson (R)	John Ahern (R)	Spokane County (part)
58th (2003-2004)	Brad Benson (R) (Note: Elected November 2, 2004 to serve unexpired term) (Note: On leave of absence for military duty Apr. 14, 2005 to Apr. 16, 2005)	Brad Benson (R)	John Ahern (R)	Spokane County (part)
59th (2005-2006)	Brad Benson (R)	John Serben (R)	John Ahern (R)	Spokane County (part)
59th (2005-2006)	Jon Wyss (R) (Note: Appointed to serve from Apr. 14, 2005 until Apr. 16, 2005)	John Serben (R)	John Ahern (R)	Spokane County (part)
59th (2005-2006)	Brad Benson (R)	John Serben (R)	John Ahern (R)	Spokane County (part)
60th (2007-2008)	Chris Marr (D)	Don Barlow (D)	John Ahern (R)	Spokane County (part)
61st (2009-2010)	Chris Marr (D)	Kevin Parker (R)	John F. Driscoll (D)	Spokane County (part)
62nd (2011-2012)	Michael Baumgartner (R)	Kevin Parker (R)	John Ahern (R)	Spokane County (part)
63rd (2013-2014)	Michael Baumgartner (R)	Kevin Parker (R)	Jeff Holy (R)	Spokane County (part)
64th (2015-2016)	Michael Baumgartner (R)	Kevin Parker (R)	Jeff Holy (R)	Spokane County (part)
65th (2017-2018)	Michael Baumgartner (R)	Mike Volz (R)	Jeff Holy (R)	Spokane County (part)
66th (2019-2020)	Jeff Holy (R)	Mike Volz (R)	Jenny Graham (R)	Spokane County (part)
67th (2021-2022)	Jeff Holy (R)	Mike Volz (R)	Jenny Graham (R)	Spokane County (part)
68th (2023-2024)	Jeff Holy (R)	Mike Volz (R)	Jenny Graham (R)	Spokane County (part)
69th (2025-2026)	Jeff Holy (R)	Mike Volz (R)	Jenny Graham (R)	Spokane County (part)

== Key ==
Democratic (D)
Populist (Pop)
Progressive (Bull Moose) (Prog)
Republican (R)

- P.P. is People's Party which was closely associate with the Populist Party.

== See also ==
- Washington Redistricting Commission
- Washington State Legislature
- Washington State Senate
- Washington House of Representatives
- Washington (state) legislative districts
