= Harold M. Tollefson =

American lawyer and politician

Mayor of Tacoma, Washington
- In office April 2, 1962 – November 21, 1967
- Preceded by: Ben Hanson
- Succeeded by: A. L. Rasmussen
- In office 1954–1956
- Preceded by: John Anderson
- Succeeded by: John Anderson

40th President of the National League of Cities
- In office 1967
- Preceded by: Jerome Cavanagh
- Succeeded by: James Tate

Tacoma City Councilor
- In office 1952–1958

Personal details
- Born: 1911
- Died: 1985 (aged 73–74)
- Spouse: Edith
- Relations: Thor C. Tollefson (brother)
- Children: 3
- Education: University of Puget Sound; University of Washington
- Profession: attorney, politician

Harold M. Tollefson (1911–1985) was an American lawyer and politician who served as the mayor of Tacoma, Washington (1954–1956; 1962–1967). He also served as president of the National League of Cities (1967) and Tacoma city councilor (1952–1958).

== Early life, education, family, and early career ==
Tollefson was born in 1911 in Perley, Minnesota. He was the fifth of seven children born to Christian Tollefson and his wife, Bertha. When he was two years old, his family moved to Tacoma, Washington, living in the McKinley Hill neighborhood. His father, who had been a farmer in Minnesota, moved to Washington to find other jobs. In Tacoma, his father opened a grocery store. When Tollefson was five, his father died. The family kept the grocery store operating for a short while after losing their patriarch, but it ultimately closed. To keep the family afloat, his eldest two siblings withdrew from school and began working.

Tollefson was the fifth-born among his siblings. His eldest sibling was Agnes Hendrickson (née Tollefson), who married Tacoma lawyer and park director Fred Hendrickson. Tollefson's second-eldest sibling was his brother Thor. In adulthood, Thor served as U.S. Congressman and county attorney. His third-eldest sibling was Guida Langlow (née Tollefson), who married prominent Tacoma insurance businessman Clarence Langlow. The next-eldest was his brother Rudolph ("Rudy"), who worked as a banker and who served as assistant city attorney of Tacoma and a judge of the Pierce County District Court. The next-born were Harold himself, followed by his brother Erling. Erling served as a judge on the Tacoma Municipal Court. The youngest sibling was his sister Dorothy DeBord (née Tollefson). Dorothy married Arthur DeBord, who served as an executive of the Federal Housing Administration in Long Beach, California.

Frequent asthma attacks led Tollefson to miss school and fall behind 2.5 years. school. He also took half a year off of high school in order to work and financially support his family. Tollefson graduated from Lincoln High School in 1928. Tollefson was, in his younger years, an avid amateur athlete. By the time he finished high school he was a standout basketball player and was offered an athletic scholarship by the University of Southern California, which he declined. Instead, after graduating high school, he worked at Hunt and Mottet Hardware, using his salary to support his two youngest siblings as they finished their education.

After five years of working, Tollefson attended University of Puget Sound for three years and the University of Washington for another three years. He continued work during his years at both schools. He received a law degree from the latter in 1939 and immediately afterward began practicing law in Tacoma.

== City Council (1952–1958) and first mayoralty (1954–56) ==
As a freeholder, Tollefson was involved in the drafting of Tacoma's new city charter in 1952, transforming its government from a commissioner–mayor system to a council–manager system of government. In the first election held after the adoption of this charter, he won a seat on the Tacoma City Council. He was then appointed to the city's mayoralty by a vote of the council.

Key work of Tollefson during his first mayoralty was seeking to eliminate the practice of commercial prostitution and gambling in the city. He also oversaw a modernization of the city's infrastructure, including city's construction of a modern sewage treatment system, the replacement of the city's wooden water mains with modern construction, and the paving of streets and installation of street lighting.

After the conclusion of his first mayoral tenure in 1956, Tollefson continued to serve on the City Council until 1958.

== Second mayoralty (1962–67) ==
In 1962, Tollefson again became mayor of Tacoma, this time being directly elected by the city's citizens. The shift to an elected mayoralty had been approved by voters in 1958. During his campaign, he pledged to honor the city's charter of the mayoralty being part-time job, rather than a full-time commitment, and cited this as his reason for aligning himself in opposition to a ballot measure that would have increased the city's mayoral salary.

Tolefson was inaugurated at approximately 9 AM local time on April 2, 1962. Unlike his first term as an appointed mayor, during his second term as an appointed mayor Tollefson was given a private office, a secretary, and a municipal vehicle. His mayoral salary was also higher, at $6,000 annually versus $2,400 during his previous tenure.

In 1962, Tollefson endorsed a "yes" vote in the referendum on Senate Joint Referendum 21 to amend the state constitution and abolish restrictions on land ownership. He also endorsed a "yes" vote on Referendum Number 33 to allow municipalities to hire certified or licensed public accountants for municipal audits as an alternative to having a state agency perform such audits.

In 1964, Tollefson publicly urged state voters to oppose Referendum 34, which would have legalized gambling in the state. The state's voters ultimately defeated the referendum, with 55.2% of votes being cast in opposition to the gambling proposal and 44.8% of votes cast in support of it. On the same day that the referendum was defeated, Tollefson was re-elected for another term as mayor. His re-election saw him defeat Julio Grassi, and secured him another 3.5 years in the position. By this time, Tollefson had publicly taken the position that the mayoralty needed to be treated as a full-time job, and that he had been wrong to argue otherwise two years prior. Tollefson argued, "The business of the city and business of the mayor seem to ever increase. State law gives the mayor many duties which don't appear in the charter."

After a spate of targeted cross burnings on lawns in Tacoma in 1965 and 1966, the Tacoma NAACP criticized the city government of not being proactive at combatting racism and the forces behind de facto racial segregation in the city. Tollefson objected to this criticism, insisting that the city, "had no real racial problem". In the weeks after, a group of seen teenage boys admitted to one of many 1966 cross burnings, and an unrelated teenage boy admitted to being responsible for two in 1965. Many others, however, went unaccounted for. City officials, the police department, and the Tacoma News Tribune dismissed all cross burnings as mere teenage hijinks.

Tollefson was regarded to be a friend of President Lyndon B. Johnson and a confidante of his vice president, Hubert Humphrey. Contrarily, he had a politically adverse relationship towards U.S. Senator Henry M. Jackson and U.S. Rep. Floyd Hicks. The two were reported to have opposed the nomination of Tollefson's brother, Thor, to serve on the Civil Aeronautics Board out of concern that confirmation of Tollefson's brother to the board would enhance the Tollefson family's public image.

During Tollefson's mayoralty, a deal was struck for the city and county governments to share tenancy of the County-City Building. He also lobbied in support of the state legislature passing legislation to give cities and counties portions of state sale tax revenue, and advocated for funding the completion of Cowlitz River dams.

Tollefson fought to prevent the Green River Watershed from being opened to public recreation by the U.S. Forest Service, due to impacts such activity would have on water quality. He advocated argued that the impacts of opening the watershed to public recreation would require a $5 million filtration plant to be built by the city. He further argued that this would increase water rates in the city; which in turn would drive away industry in the city, harming its economy.

In 1967, Tollefson lost re-election to A. L. Rasmussen. His mayoralty ended on November 21.

=== National League of Cities and Washington Association of Cities ===
Tollefson was a member of the executive board of the Washington Association of Cities.

Tollefson served on the executive committee of the National League of Cities, including as its vice president in 1965. In late 1966, he was elected to serve as the organization's president for the year 1967, and did so.

In his positions within the National League of Cities and Washington Association of Cities, he advocated for expanded antigovernment cooperation. He also organized lobbying efforts by cities for funding of the Model Cities Program.

== Post-mayoralty ==
After leaving office, Tollefson returned to the private practice of law in Tacoma. In his post mayoralty, he remained involved in public policy as a board member of the Municipal Research and Services Center of Washington. He also served as president of the Tacoma chapter of the Lions Club and president of the Tacoma Bar Association (legal bar organization).

== Personal life ==
Tollefson and his wife, Edith, met soon after he became a lawyer. Together, they had children Nicola, Andrea, and Brian together. Their son, Brian Tollefson, served on the Pierce County Superior Court from 1989 to 2016. One of Tolefson's nephews, Rudy Tollefson, served as a judge on the same court from 1979 to 2000.

=== Death ===
Tollefson died in 1985. He was survived by his wife and three children, as well as by three grandchildren, his brother Erling, and his sisters Agnes and Gyda.

Harold M. Tollefson Square (also known as "Tollefson Plaza") in Tacoma's downtown is named for Tollefson.
