= Senator Happy =

Senator Happy may refer to:

- John H. Happy (1895–1962), Washington State Senate
- Marjorie Happy (1898–1970), Washington State Senate

== See also ==
- Happy Chandler (1898–1991), U.S. Senator from Kentucky from 1939 to 1945
