= Pacific Northwest Economic Region =

The Pacific NorthWest Economic Region (PNWER) is a statutory, collaborative, U.S.-Canadian nonprofit organization dedicated to addressing common issues and interests, such as encouraging global economic competitiveness and preserving the natural environment. The Canadian provinces and territories of British Columbia, Alberta, Saskatchewan, the Yukon, the Northwest Territories along with the American states of Alaska, Washington, Idaho, Montana, and Oregon compose the membership. It is designed to improve cooperation and communication between member jurisdictions, as well as between the public and private sector. The Pacific Northwest Economic Region (PNWER) serves as a cross-border forum for both public and private sectors, facilitating open dialogue. This forum leverages the collaborative efforts between business leaders and elected officials to enhance the region's global competitiveness. Former BC cabinet minister and legal scholar Andrew Petter describes the PNWER as one of North America's most sophisticated examples of regionalist paradiplomacy.

== Program areas ==
From agriculture to workforce development, PNWER addresses a broad range of regional issues through working groups. Each working group is headed by two co-chairs, one from the private sector and one from the public sector, and coordinated by a PNWER staff member. PNWER manages 20 different working groups that focus on key sectors of the regional economy. These include: Agriculture, Arctic Issues, Border Policy, Cross-Border Livestock Health, Disaster Resilience, Economic Development, Energy and Environment, Forestry, Innovation, Invasive Species, Mining, Tourism, Transportation and Infrastructure, Water Policy, and Workforce Development.

== History ==
The Pacific Northwest Economic Region was established by statute in 1991, encompassing the organization's original seven legislative jurisdictions – Washington, Oregon, Idaho, Montana, and Alaska in the United States, and British Columbia and Alberta in Canada. The Yukon joined PNWER in 1994, Saskatchewan joined in 2008, and the Northwest Territories joined in 2009. From the beginning, all state and provincial legislators were members of PNWER. The governors and premiers were added to the PNWER governance structure in 1993.

The proposal establishing PNWER passed with 701 out of 703 sitting legislators voting in its favor following a three-year process initiated by the Pacific Northwest Legislative Leadership Forum (PNLLF) in 1988. Six working groups were established, including environmental technology, tourism, recycling, value-added timber, workforce training, and telecommunications; some of these merged into or were later replaced by new areas of concentration. Critical in establishing the initiative to create the PNWER were Washington State Senator Alan Bluechel and Deputy Premier and Minister of Federal and Intergovernmental Affairs for Alberta, Jim Horsman. Bluechel served as the organization's first president. Another President was Mel Knight, a former Energy Minister of Alberta.

PNWER incorporated official private sector participation – including the non-elective public sector, and nonprofit organizations and NGOs in 1994; with that, a private sector council mirroring that of the organization's legislative delegate council was established, and private and public sector co-chairs became part of the working group structure. Each working group has its agenda set by representatives of the private industries. Since then, funding for PNWER has been balanced by the public and private sectors. The organization's current (2010) annual budget is U.S. $1.4 million, with approximately one-third from state and provincial dues, one-third from private-sector sponsorship and dues, and one-third from public and private grants.
