= Alfred Adams =

Alfred Adams may refer to:

- Alf Adams (born 1939), British physicist
- Alfred O. Adams (1897–1989), American politician in the Washington House of Representatives
- Alfred T. Adams (1898–1982), attorney and American football and basketball player and coach
- Alfred Walter Adams (died 1882), Manx lawyer
- Selina Peratrovich (1889 or 1890–1984), sometimes credited as Mrs. Alfred Adams, a Haida weaver
