= Pardini =

Pardini is an Italian surname, and may refer to:

== People ==
Notable people with the surname include:

- A. J. Pardini (1932–2011), American politician
- Julio César Pardini (born 1984), Mexican footballer
- Lou Pardini (born 1952), American singer-songwriter
- Olivier Pardini (born 1985), Belgian cyclist
- Stefano Pardini (born 1975), Italian footballer

== Companies ==
- Pardini Arms, Italian firearms manufacturer
- Sellerie Automobile Pardini
