= Community transit =

Community transit may refer to:

- The community transit procedure (now Union transit) within the European Union Customs Union
- Community Transit in Snohomish County, Washington
- Community Transit (Minnesota) in Minnesota
- Cobb Community Transit in Georgia
