= Senator Guess =

Senator Guess may refer to:

- Gretchen Guess (born 1969), Alaska State Senate
- Sam C. Guess (1909–1989), Washington State Senate
