= Thor C. Tollefson =

American politician (1901–1982)

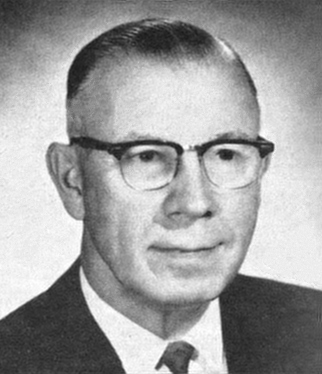

Member of the U.S. House of Representatives from Washington's 6th district
- In office January 3, 1947 – January 3, 1965
- Preceded by: John M. Coffee
- Succeeded by: Floyd Hicks

Personal details
- Born: May 2, 1901 Perley, Minnesota, U.S.
- Died: December 30, 1982 (aged 81) Tacoma, Washington, U.S.
- Party: Republican
- Relatives: Harold M. Tollefson (brother)
- Education: University of Washington (LLB)

Thor Carl Tollefson (May 2, 1901 – December 30, 1982) was an American attorney and politician who was a U.S. representative for Washington's 6th congressional district from 1947 to 1965. He is to date the first and only Republican to represent the district as of 2025.

== Early life and education ==
Born in Perley, Minnesota, Tollefson moved to Tacoma, Washington, in 1912. He attended public schools and graduated from Lincoln High School in 1924. He graduated from the University of Washington School of Law in 1930.

== Career ==
Tollefson was admitted to the bar in 1930 and commenced practice in Tacoma. He was the elected prosecutor of Pierce County from 1938 to 1946 and a delegate to the Republican State conventions in 1936, 1938, 1940, 1942 and 1944.

in 1944 Tollefson ran for a seat in the U.S. House of Representatives, losing by 22 points to incumbent Democrat John Coffee. Trying again in the Republican wave election of 1946, Tollefson defeat Coffee by eight points. Although these margins did not augur well for the Republican, he continued in the House through nine congresses (January 3, 1947 – January 3, 1965) from Washington's 6th congressional district. Tollefson's best electoral performance was in the 1962 election, when he defeated the Democratic challenger by forty-two points. This margin may have convinced him that he could hazard an endorsement of Republican presidential candidate Barry Goldwater in 1964, but the landslide against Goldwater ended Tollefson's congressional career as he lost to the Democrat Floyd Hicks by four points. Tollefson's failure to run for the House again in 1966 may have been a result of the requirements of cross-country travel between Seattle and Washington, D.C. In 1956 he had made a serious but aborted run for governor of Washington state.

Tollefson sat on the Merchant Marine and Fisheries Committee all nine terms, rising to ranking Republican in his fifth congress. He sponsored five enacted bills, four enacted resolutions, and six enacted floor amendments on the topics of that committee. Tollefson voted in favor of the Civil Rights Acts of 1957, 1960, and 1964, as well as the 24th Amendment to the U.S. Constitution.

Tollefson was appointed director of the Washington Department of Fish and Wildlife and served ten years. He was also a special assistant to the Governor of Washington in charge of international fisheries negotiations.

== Personal life ==
Tollefson was a resident of Tacoma until his death there on December 30, 1982. He was interred in Mountain View Memorial Park.

One of his brothers, Harold M. Tollefson, served as mayor of Tacoma. Another brother, Erling Tollefson, served as a judge on the Tacoma Municipal Court. One of his nephews, Rudy Tollefson, served as a judge on the Pierce County Superior Court from 1979 to 2000. Another of his nephews, Brian Tollefson (son of Harold) served on the same court from 1989 to 2016.

== Sources ==
- United States Congress. "Thor C. Tollefson (id: T000298)". Biographical Directory of the United States Congress.

U.S. House of Representatives
Preceded by John M. Coffee	Member of the U.S. House of Representatives from Washington's 6th congressional district 1947–1965	Succeeded by Floyd Verne Hicks
