= Senator Crow (disambiguation) =

William E. Crow (1870–1922) was a U.S. Senator from Pennsylvania from 1921 to 1922. Senator Crow or Crowe may also refer to:

- Herman D. Crow (1851–1915), Washington State Senate
- Herschal Crow (1935–2015), Oklahoma State Senate
- L. C. Crow (1851–1938), Washington State Senate
- Wayman Crow (1808–1885), Missouri State Senate
- A. G. Crowe (born 1948), Louisiana State Senate
- Rachelle Crowe (born 1972/1973), Illinois State Senate
- Rusty Crowe (born 1947), Tennessee State Senate
