= R. C. McCroskey =

American politician (1845–1922)

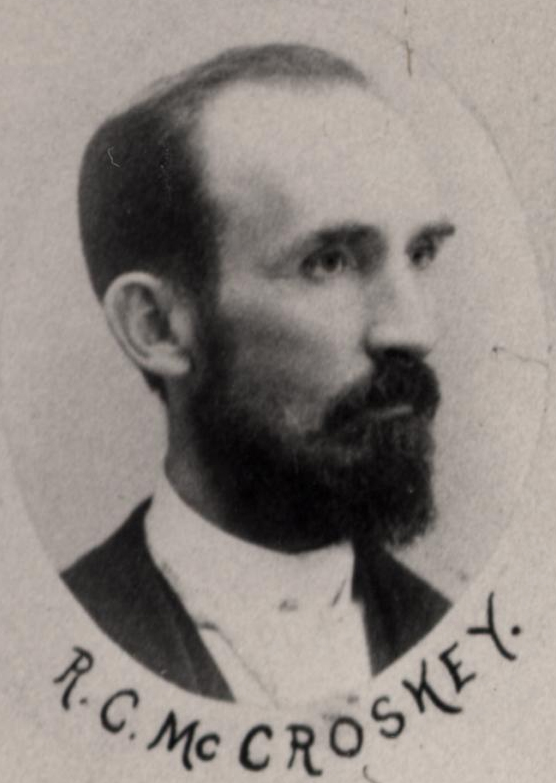
- McCroskey in 1891

Member of the Washington Senate from the 6th district
- In office January 7, 1891 – January 14, 1895
- Preceded by: C. G. Austin
- Succeeded by: L. C. Crow

Personal details
- Born: Robert Crampton McCroskey; March 10, 1845 Monroe County, Tennessee, U.S.
- Died: April 10, 1922 (aged 77) Garfield, Washington, U.S.
- Party: Democratic

Robert Crampton McCroskey (March 10, 1845 – April 10, 1922) was an American politician in the state of Washington. He served in the Washington State Senate from 1891 to 1895.
