= Duane Sommers =

American politician

Member of the Washington House of Representatives from the 6th district
- In office January 9, 1995 – January 8, 2001
- Preceded by: Todd Mielke
- Succeeded by: John Ahern
- In office January 12, 1987 – January 11, 1993
- Preceded by: James E. West
- Succeeded by: Jean Silver

Personal details
- Born: November 15, 1932 Spokane, Washington, U.S.
- Died: August 26, 2015 (aged 82) Spokane, Washington, U.S.
- Party: Republican

Duane Sommers (November 15, 1932 – August 26, 2015) was an American politician who served in the Washington House of Representatives from the 6th district from 1987 to 1993 and from 1995 to 2001.

He died on August 26, 2015, in Spokane, Washington at age 82.
