= Alfred O. Adams =

American politician (1897–1989)

Dr. Alfred O. Adams
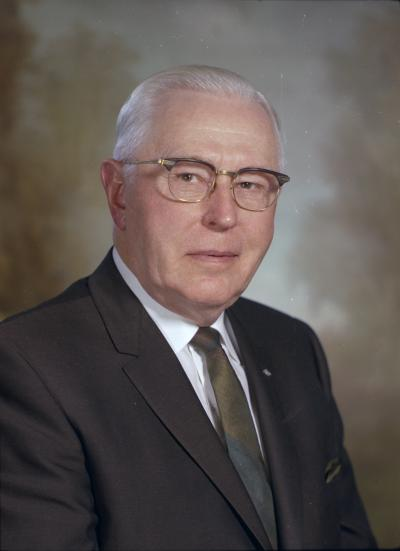
- Adams in 1967

Member of the Washington House of Representatives for the 6th district
- In office 1953–1969

Personal details
- Born: January 10, 1897 Paola, Kansas, U.S.
- Died: October 25, 1989 (aged 92) Spokane, Washington, U.S.
- Party: Republican

Alfred O. Adams (January 10, 1897 – October 25, 1989) was an American politician in the state of Washington. He served in the Washington House of Representatives from 1953 to 1969 for District 6. Throughout his time in office, Adams was noted for advocating fiscal responsibility and for his tough-on-crime stance.

== Early life and education ==
Adams was born in Paola, Kansas, on January 10, 1897. During World War I, Adams was a member of the Missouri National Guard and served in England before moving to St. Louis, Missouri for college. Adams graduated from the Washington University School of Medicine in 1924.

== Medical career ==
Adams began his medical career as an intern at St. Luke's Hospital in St. Louis, followed by positions at the Shriner's Hospital in St. Louis and the Riley Hospital for Children in Indianapolis. In 1930, Adams moved to Spokane, Washington to become chief surgeon of the city's Shriner's Hospital. He quickly became involved in the local medical community, becoming a member of the Spokane County Medical Society in 1935 and the Pacific Coast Surgical Society in 1937. At the time Adams moved to Spokane, the Shriner's hospital was renting space from another Spokane hospital. Under his leadership the hospital moved to a stand-alone building and began to focus heavily on children's orthopedic surgery. Adams resigned from the Shriner's Hospital in 1946 to enter private practice and began consulting at the University of Washington School of Medicine in 1950. He retired from medicine in 1955.

== Political career ==
In 1952, Adams entered the Republican primary for the state representative position in Washington's 6th legislative district, citing the need for a balanced budget and cutting government spending as reasons for running. Adams won the general election along with fellow Republican Elmer E. Johnston. During his first term in office he partnered with Wilfred A. Gamon, the only other medical doctor in the house, to sponsor legislation creating a doctor's office at the Washington State Capitol. In 1955, Adams supported efforts to increase medical services at mental hospitals and to require doctors practicing in Washington to be licensed in-state. That same year, Adams opposed a successful measure to require people with certain medical conditions to go through additional scrutiny to receive a driver's license. Adams also sponsored legislation to create a disciplinary system for doctors found to be violating professional standards.

Adams sponsored legislation in 1957 that would have required candidates for public office publicly state their place of birth, education, and employment history on the ballot. Adams was a dedicated opponent of what he viewed as government waste, attacking successful legislation to increase welfare benefits. He also criticized the construction of state agency field offices in Spokane for utilizing a secret bidding process in 1958. Following his criticism, Governor Albert Rosellini cancelled the construction and the plan's originator resigned. In 1959 Adams sponsored legislation allowing hospitals to involuntarily commit people suspected of having mental disorders and immunizing those hospitals from lawsuits.

Adams supported 1960 efforts to require prisoners to pay rent while imprisoned, claiming that taxpayers should not have to support them. The following year, Adams sponsored legislation attempting to block the construction of the Washington Corrections Center in Shelton, saying that Shelton was a poor location because it would make it more difficult for the area to attract high-quality professionals. He also sponsored legislation to streamline the organ donation process and opposed legislation to expand the state healthcare system to developmentally-disabled children. After legislators proposed changes to the state's discrimination statue in 1961, Adams became a vocal opponent of the State Board Against Discrimination, describing it as violating due process.

Adams continued his tough-on-crime stance in 1962, ordering a probe of the state parole process. The following year Adams furthered his previous conflicts with Governor Rosellini when Rosellini aired his budget address on statewide television, demanding equal airtime for the legislature's Republicans. Also in 1963 Adams testified in former state legislator John Goldmark's libel case for claims that Goldmark was sympathetic to Communists. Adams alleged that Goldmark's loyalty to the United States was "questionable". Adams sponsored legislation to punish welfare fraud with prison time in 1964 and proposed reforms to the State Board Against Discrimination in 1965 that would guarantee a jury trial for people accused of discrimination. After introducing the latter legislation, Adams accused the Board as being "the most biased thing we have in the state of Washington" and said that Spokane did not have a discrimination problem.

In 1967, Adams supported legislation extending greater authority to nurses in making medical decisions. The legislation allowed nurses to administer certain drugs and shots as long as a licensed physician was present. The following year Adams sponsored legislation to legalize heart transplants in Washington. Before opting to resign at the end of 1969, Adams supported two more tough-on-crime pieces of legislation: One that would have required prison time for drug addicts and one that would have expanded police officer's legal use of force. After his retirement, Adams served as a presidential elector for the 1972 presidential election.

== Personal life ==
Adams' first wife was Helen Bessie Adams, who died on April 30, 1962. Adams married his second wife, Lulu M. Wilson, a widow, on April 11, 1964. The two had one son, Roy Adams. Adams died on October 25, 1989.
