= Mark Litchman =

American politician from Washington (1925–2021)

Mark Litchman Jr.
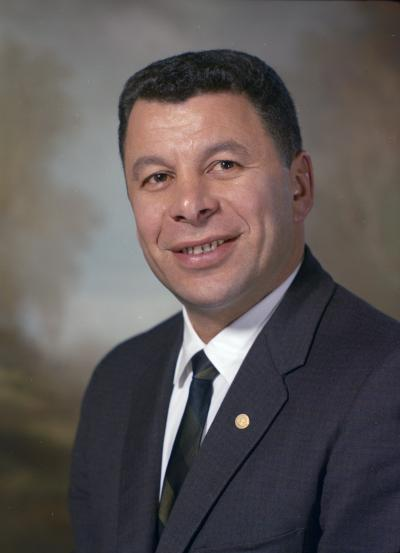
- Litchman in 1967

Member of the Washington House of Representatives from the 45th district
- In office January 10, 1955 – January 8, 1973
- Preceded by: Joseph C. Lawrence
- Succeeded by: Alan Bluechel

Personal details
- Born: April 14, 1925 Seattle, Washington, U.S.
- Died: September 8, 2021 (aged 96)
- Party: Democratic
- Profession: Lawyer

Mark Leonard Litchman Jr. (April 14, 1925 – September 8, 2021) was an American lawyer and politician from the state of Washington.

Born in Seattle, he was the son of prominent lawyer Mark M. Litchman. He attended the University of Washington in sociology and graduated with an LL.B. A veteran of World War II, having served in the United States Navy, he is an attorney and former president of a real estate firm.

Litchman was elected to the Washington House of Representatives in 1955, for district 45 (parts of King County), as a Democrat. He served until 1973. In 1961, he was majority leader of the House.

Litchman was married and had three children. He died on September 8, 2021, at the age of 96.
