= John M. Coffee =

American politician

John Main Coffee
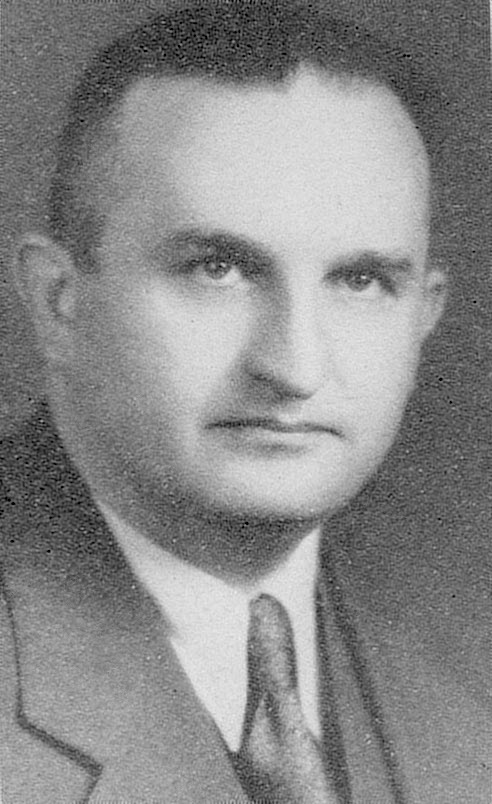
- Coffee as depicted in the Pictorial Directory of the 79th Congress

Member of the U.S. House of Representatives from Washington's 6th district
- In office January 3, 1937 – January 3, 1947
- Preceded by: Wesley Lloyd
- Succeeded by: Thor C. Tollefson

Personal details
- Born: January 23, 1897 Tacoma, Washington, U.S.
- Died: June 2, 1983 (aged 86)
- Party: Democratic

John Main Coffee (January 23, 1897 – June 2, 1983) was a U.S. representative from Washington.

== Education ==
John Coffee was born in Tacoma, Washington and attended the public schools. He then attended the University of Washington in Seattle, earning an A.B. and LL.B., 1920 and graduated from the law department of Yale Law School, J.D., in 1921.

He was admitted to the bar in 1922 and commenced practice as a lawyer in Tacoma, Washington.

== Public service ==
In 1922, Coffee was appointed Secretary to United States Senator C.C. Dill until 1924. He then became Secretary of the Advisory Board of the National Recovery Administration, 1933-1935.

Coffee also served as Appraiser and examiner of Pierce County, Washington for the State Inheritance Tax and Escheat Division from 1933 to 1936 as well as Civil service commissioner for Tacoma, Washington, in 1936.

== Election ==
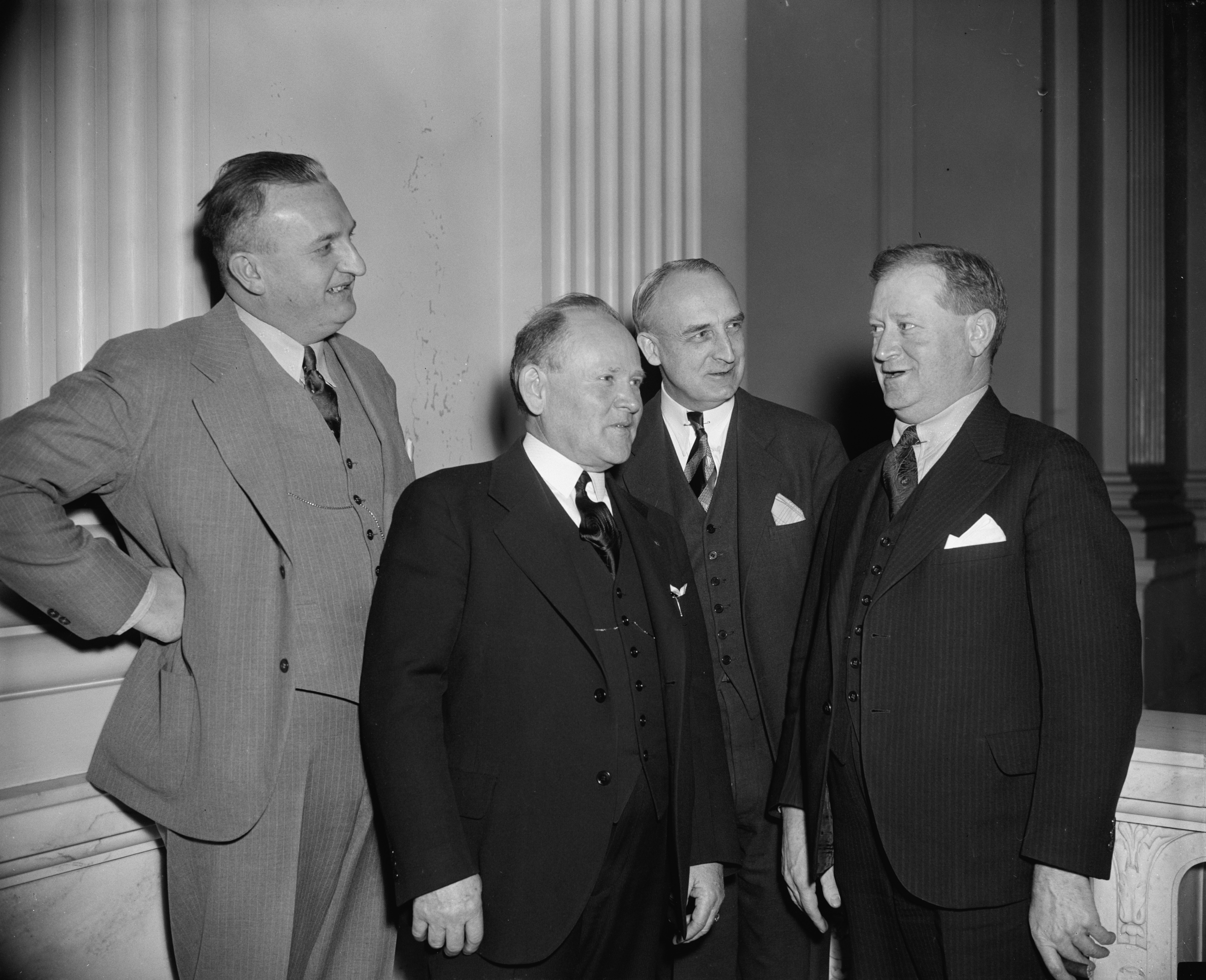
Coffee (far left) with other congressmen, 1938

Coffee was elected to the U.S. House of Representatives in 1936 as a Washington Commonwealth Federation-endorsed Democrat and served in Seventy-fifth and to the four succeeding Congresses (January 3, 1937 – January 3, 1947).

On August 13, 1937, Rep. Coffee introduced a bill to create a permanent Federal Bureau of Fine Arts with six departments: theatre, dance, music, literature, graphic and plastic arts, and architecture and decoration. A similar bill was introduced in the Senate by Florida Senator Claude Pepper. Opera singer Lawrence Tibbett chaired a citizens' committee promoting the bill, which was supported by Robert Montgomery, Theodore Dreiser, Lillian Gish, Martha Graham, Rockwell Kent, Hendrik Willem van Loon, and Sherwood Anderson, among others. Frank Lloyd Wright also supported the bill. The bill was opposed by sculptor Gutzon Borglum and composer Walter Damrosch. The Fine Arts Federation of New York called the bill an attempt to unionize artists, warning that it would sap their creative spirit, and the advent of World War II led to its abandonment.

In 1945, Coffee wrote an article titled "Stop the Spanish Atomic Bomb!" published in The Nation and the Daily Worker calling for a "complete diplomatic and commercial break" with Francoist Spain.

In 1946 it was revealed during the Garsson/May investigation that Coffee had accepted a $2500 check from a Tacoma contractor in 1941 and failed to list it as a campaign contribution. Coffee promised not to accept such gifts in the future.

Coffee was an unsuccessful candidate for reelection in 1946 to the Eightieth Congress when he was defeated by Republican Thor Tollefson. Coffee would also run losing races in 1950 for the Eighty-second Congress and in 1958 to the Eighty-sixth Congress.

== Death ==
Coffee then became a practicing attorney in Tacoma, Washington, until his death in June 1983.

== John Main Coffee Jr. ==
Coffee's son, John Main Coffee Jr. (November 20, 1928 – May 8, 2012), was a Unitarian minister and a longtime professor of history at Emerson College in Boston, Massachusetts, and coauthored A Century of Eloquence: the history of Emerson College, 1880-1980. He was also editor of The Fare Box, a publication from the American Vecturist Association.

U.S. House of Representatives
Preceded by Wesley Lloyd	Member of the U.S. House of Representatives from Washington's 6th congressional district 1937-1947	Succeeded by Thor C. Tollefson
