= Community Transit (Minnesota) =

Provider of mass transportation in Southwestern Minnesota

- Headquarters: 1400 S. Saratoga St., Marshall, MN
- Locale: Marshall and Redwood Falls, Minnesota
- Service area: Cottonwood, Jackson, Lincoln, Lyon, Murray, Pipestone, Redwood and Rock counties, Minnesota
- Service type: Bus service, paratransit
- Routes: 4
- Fleet: 8 buses
- Annual ridership: 223,558 (2019)
- Website: Community Transit

Community Transit is the primary provider of mass transportation in Marshall and Redwood Falls, Minnesota with four routes serving the region in addition to countywide demand-response services in eight counties. As of 2019, the system provided 223,558 rides over 67,578 annual vehicle revenue hours with 8 buses and 102 paratransit vehicles.

== History ==
For a number of years, Community Transit has only provided demand-response service outside of Marshall. Tracy, for instance, has been provided with demand-response service since 2014. However, in the late 2010s, fixed-route service has expanded to other communities in the service area. The Green Route in Redwood Falls began operating in July 2017 and was expanded with additional stops in December 2018. On June 24, 2019, the Purple Route was also added, with buses operating between Tracy, Balaton, and Marshall.

== Service ==
Community Transit operates four weekday deviated fixed-route bus routes. Two routes serve Marshall, one route serves Redwood Falls, and one regional route connects Tracy, Balaton, and Marshall. Hours of operation for the fixed-route system are Monday through Friday from 7:00 A.M. to 6:53 P.M. in Marshall and from 8:00 A.M. to 4:55 P.M. in Redwood Falls. Weekend service is provided from 10:00 A.M. to 6:53 P.M. in Marshall, while there is no service on weekends for the fixed-route services in Redwood Falls. The Purple Route operates twice daily on weekdays. Regular fares are $1.00 for the local routes and $3.00 for the Purple Route.

=== Routes ===
- Red Route (Marshall)
- Blue Route (Marshall)
- Green Route (Redwood Falls)
- Purple Route (Tracy - Balaton - Marshall)

== Fixed route ridership ==
The ridership statistics shown here are of fixed route services only and do not include demand response services.

== See also ==
- List of bus transit systems in the United States
- Central Community Transit
