= Division Street Bridge (Spokane, Washington) =

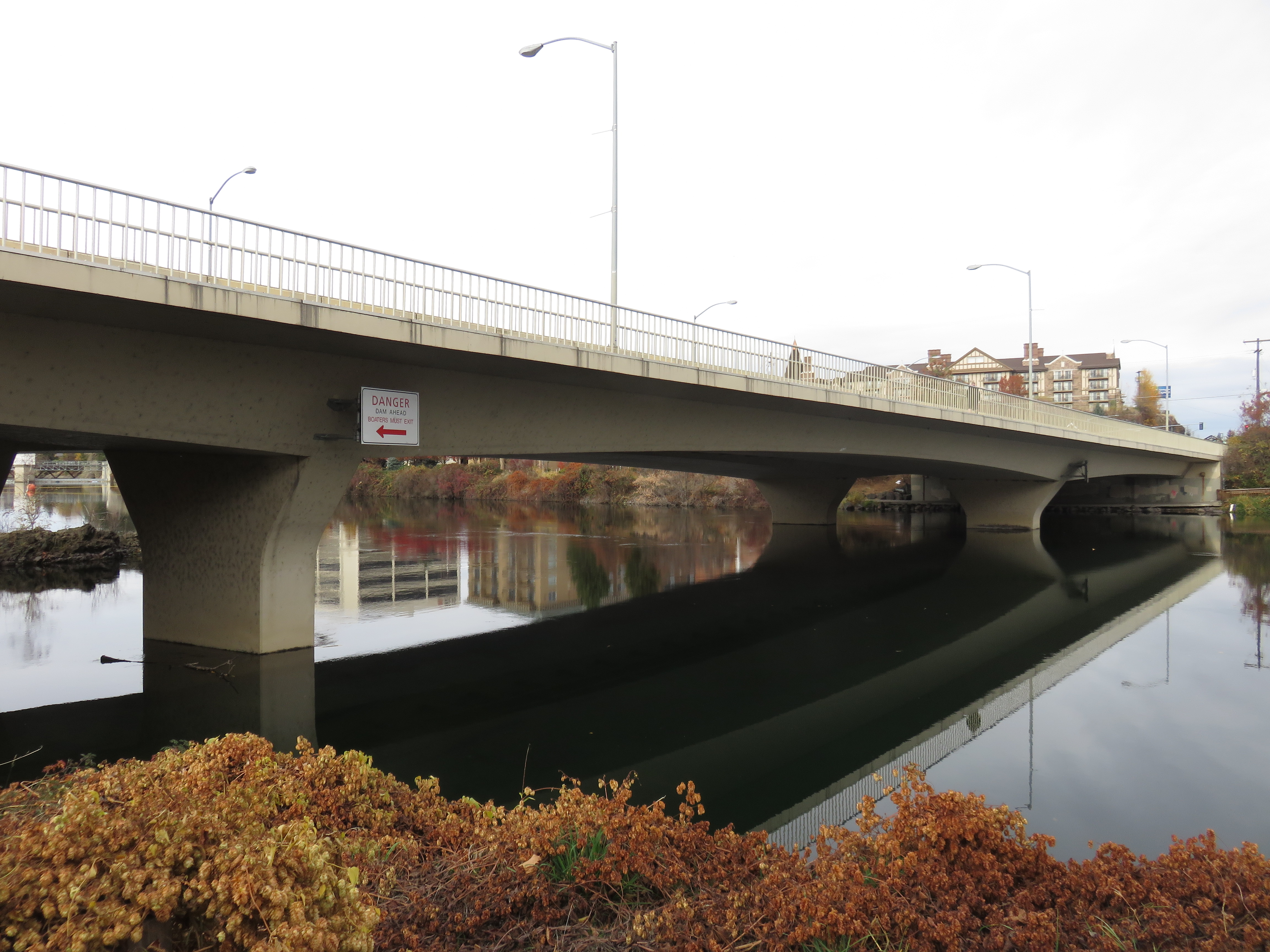
- The fourth, and current iteration, of the Division Street Bridge as seen in 2018
- Coordinates: 47.6626°N 117.4112°W
- Carried: Automobiles, Trucks and Pedestrians
- Crossed: Spokane River
- Locale: Spokane, Washington, U.S.
- Official name: Senator Sam C. Guess Memorial Bridge
- Named for: Division Street

Characteristics
- Trough construction: Concrete
- No. of lanes: 6 Travel lanes (3 lanes each direction)

History
- Designer: Hugh L. Cooper (1892 span)
- Opened: 1888
- Rebuilt: 1892, 1917, 1992
- Collapsed: 1915 (1892 span)

The Division Street Bridge is a road bridge located in Spokane, Washington that carries Division Street, U.S. 2, and U.S. 395 across the Spokane River in Downtown Spokane, roughly a half-mile east (upstream) of Spokane Falls. There have been multiple iterations of the bridge throughout its history. The current bridge is a concrete span and was built in 1992 and is officially known as the Senator Sam C. Guess Memorial Bridge.

The original bridge was a wooden truss structure built in 1882, which was replaced in 1892 by the steel bridge. The designer, Hugh L. Cooper from New York, designed the bridge to hold a dead load of 4800 pounds per linear foot, which he claimed was a weight far greater than any standard freight train at the time. The bridge was designed with two streetcar tracks, roadbed for horse and wagon (and, later, automobile) traffic, and pedestrian sidewalks.

== History ==
=== 1888 span ===
The first iteration of the Division Street Bridge was constructed in 1888 out of wood, allowing Division Street to be carried over the Spokane River for the first time.

=== 1892 span ===
A new bridge was constructed out of steel in 1892, replacing the wooden span. It was built by the San Francisco Bridge Company. During a flood in 1894, a railroad bridge upstream from downtown Spokane was washed out and collided with the steel span at Division Street. The beams that would later break in 1915 bore signs of significant damage and were repaired by re-welding.

==== 1915 collapse ====
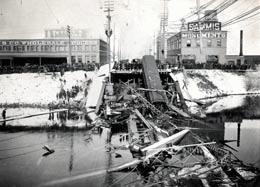
View of the collapse, taken from the south bank of the Spokane River looking northward

At 6:11 am on Saturday, December 18, 1915, two Washington Water Power trolley cars were crossing the steel bridge, one headed north and the other south, when the repaired beams gave way. Approximately 150 feet of the bridge's northern section fell. The northbound streetcar had nearly reached the far side and its snow scrapers snagged on debris on the north side, preventing it from rolling back into the river. All four occupants escaped without major injury. Because of the early hour and freezing weather, there were no pedestrians or automobiles crossing the bridge at the time.

The southbound streetcar, heading for downtown with 17 passengers, was close to the middle of the span when it fell. The Spokane River is around 30 to 40 feet deep at that point, but the fallen bridge deck had lodged onto old pilings below the surface and thus kept the car from being completely submerged in the freezing water.

All the fatalities and injuries came from the southbound car. A steel girder had sliced through the top half of the car, killing several people outright, and then pinned several more people in the water underneath it. The other victims avoided drowning by clinging to the wreckage, although the entire affair quickly became coated with ice.

The Spokane Fire Department responded to the scene but was coming from the south end of Division Street and was unable to reach the survivors from that point. After a 30-minute detour across another bridge, the Fire Department was able to lower ladders into the water on the north side to rescue the survivors and recover the remains of the deceased.

The bridge designer, Hugh L. Cooper, happened to be in Spokane working on another project at the time of the collapse. After inspecting the bridge, he felt that the damage suffered from the 1894 collision was largely responsible for the failure of the structural members. Another engineer also examined the disaster and questioned the quality of the steel that was used in its construction.

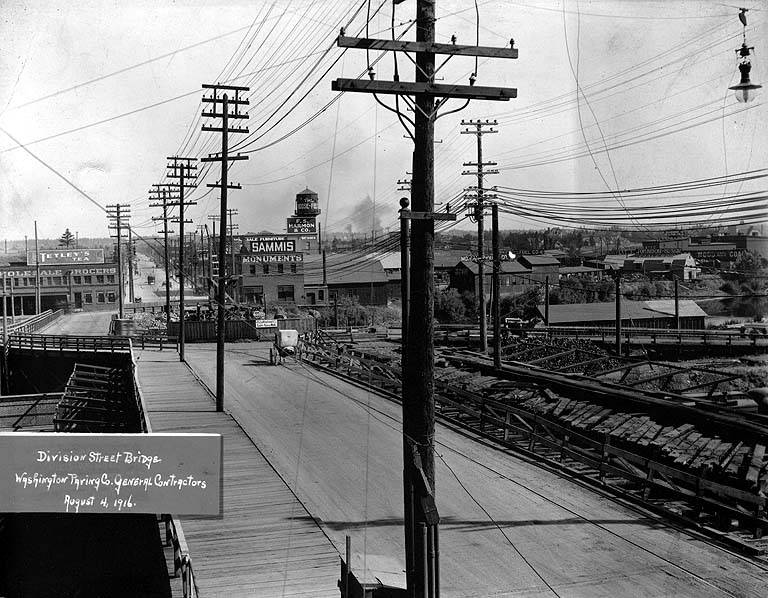
View of the temporary replacement bridge in 1916

There were a total of five fatalities and 12 injuries as a result of the collapse. A wooden span was quickly constructed to replace the bridge until a more permanent replacement bridge could be constructed out of concrete.

=== 1917 replacement ===
The replacement span was a three-vault concrete bridge. It remained until 1992 when it got replaced by the fourth iteration of the bridge due to age and need to accommodate a higher amount of traffic.

The 1917 span of the Division Street Bridge in 1920

=== Current span (1992 replacement) ===
The current-day Division Street Bridge was opened in 1992 and is officially known as the Senator Sam C. Guess Memorial Bridge. The concrete bridge features six lanes of travel lanes, three in each direction, as well as a separated sidewalk on each side. The bridge also provides two access points to the Spokane River Centennial Trail that runs beneath the bridge, parallel to the Spokane River.

== See also ==
List of crossings of the Spokane River.
