= John Ahern (politician) =

American politician (1934–2020)

Member of the Washington House of Representatives from the 6th district
- In office January 10, 2011 – January 14, 2013
- Preceded by: John Driscoll
- Succeeded by: Jeff Holy

Member of the Washington House of Representatives from the 6th district
- In office January 8, 2001 – January 12, 2009
- Preceded by: Duane Sommers
- Succeeded by: John Driscoll

Personal details
- Born: John Edward Ahern; December 4, 1934 Havre, Montana, U.S.
- Died: December 19, 2020 (aged 86) Spokane, Washington, U.S.
- Party: Republican
- Occupation: Politician

John Edward Ahern (December 4, 1934 – December 19, 2020) was an American politician of the Republican Party who served in the Washington House of Representatives, representing the 6th district from 2001 to 2009 and 2011 to 2013. Ahern was born in Havre, Montana, and lived with his family in Silver Springs, Maryland. He went to the University of Maryland and served in the United States Army Reserves. Ahern was a Catholic. He received his undergrad education from the University of Denver and had a law degree from Gonzaga University. He was involved with the office products and supplies business in Spokane, Washington.

== Personal life ==
Ahern's wife was Nancy Ahern. They have three children. Ahern and his family live in Spokane, Washington.

Ahern died on December 19, 2020, in Spokane, Washington, at age 86.
