= Van Ness Feldman =

American law firm

Van Ness Feldman is a law and government relations firm specializing in energy, environment and natural resources law with offices in Washington D.C., Seattle, the San Francisco Bay Area, Houston and Baton Rouge.

== History ==
Founded in Washington, D.C. in 1977 by four former congressional and executive branch counsel, Van Ness Feldman has grown to include over 100 lawyers and policy professionals in their Washington, D.C., Seattle, Bay Area, Houston and Baton Rouge offices.

Two of the firm's original founders, William J. "Bill" Van Ness Jr. and Howard Feldman worked under U.S. Senator Henry "Scoop" Jackson. Van Ness first served as special counsel and later (beginning in 1970) as chief counsel of the Committee on Interior and Insular Affairs. During his tenure, he drafted several pieces of major environmental legislation, including the Alaska Native Claims Settlement Act (ANCSA) and the National Environmental Policy Act (NEPA).

== Notable attorneys in the firm ==
Current Acting Federal Energy Regulatory Commission Chair, Willie Phillips, is an alumnus of the firm.

The late Robert (Bob) Nordhaus was a partner in the firm. Bob originally joined Van Ness Feldman in 1981, after serving three years as the Federal Energy Regulatory Commission’s first General Counsel. He practiced with the firm until 1993, when he was appointed General Counsel of the Department of Energy by President Clinton. He rejoined the firm in 1997. In 1977, prior to his service at FERC, Bob was a member of the Energy Policy and Planning Office in the Carter White House, and served as Assistant Administrator of the Federal Energy Administration. In 1975 and 1976, he was counsel to the House Commerce Committee, and from 1963 to 1974, he was Assistant Counsel in the Legislative Counsel’s Office of the U.S. House of Representatives and was the author of Section 111(d) of the Clean Air Act.

Former Federal Energy Regulatory Commission general counsel Doug Smith currently serves as Co-Chair of the firm, and serves alongside Nancy Macan McNally.

Former U.S. Senate Sergeant at Arms James Ziglar is Senior Counsel at the firm. Former Congressman Norm Dicks joined the firm in 2013 as Senior Policy Advisor. In May 2015, former Senator Mary Landrieu joined the firm as a Senior Policy Advisor.

Jack Lew, former Secretary of the Treasury, former Director of the White House Office of Management and Budget and former White House Chief of Staff was a partner in the firm from 1988 to 1993.
