= Jean Silver =

Washington State politician

B. Jean Silver

Member of the Washington House of Representatives from the 6th district
- In office January 11, 1993 – January 13, 1997
- Preceded by: Duane R. Sommers
- Succeeded by: Brad Benson

Member of the Washington House of Representatives from the 5th district
- In office January 10, 1983 – January 11, 1993
- Preceded by: Geraldine McCormick
- Succeeded by: Brian C. Thomas

Personal details
- Born: July 25, 1926 Spokane, Washington, U.S.
- Died: March 14, 2000 (aged 73)
- Party: Republican
- Spouse: Chuck (Silver?)
- Education: Eastern Washington University (graduate in business); University of Washington (attended)
- Occupation: Certified Public Accountant

B. Jean Silver (possibly Jean B. Silver, as named in some sources; July 25, 1926 – March 14, 2000) was an American politician who served seven consecutive terms in the Washington House of Representatives from 1983 to 1997. Born in Spokane, Washington, she represented Washington's 5th and then 6th legislative districts, both in Spokane County, as a Republican.

Silver worked as a certified public accountant and a consultant on economic development financing, including as a contract consultant to the City of Spokane. With her husband Chuck, she also co-owned a glass company. She served on the board of Washington Water Power Company (now Avista).
