= Brian Thomas (politician) =

American politician (born 1939)

Member of the Washington House of Representatives from the 5th district
- In office 1993–2000
- Preceded by: Jean Silver
- Succeeded by: Glenn Anderson

Personal details
- Born: May 19, 1939 (age 87) Tacoma, Washington
- Party: Republican
- Education: B.S. Oregon State University, M.B.A. Pacific Lutheran University

Brian Thomas (born May 19, 1939) is an American politician of the Republican Party. He was a member of the Washington House of Representatives, representing the 5th district.

In 1989, Thomas was elected to the Issaquah School District and served as president before being elected to the legislature in 1993. In the legislature, Thomas served as chair and as co-chair of the House Finance Committee.
