= A. L. Rasmussen =

American politician

A. L. (Slim) Rasmussen
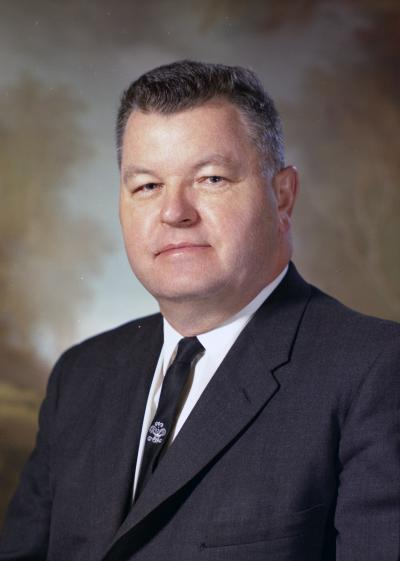
- Rasmussen in 1967

President pro tempore of the Washington Senate
- In office January 12, 1987 – January 10, 1988
- Preceded by: Barney Goltz
- Succeeded by: Alan Bluechel

Member of the Washington State Senate from the 29th district
- In office October 1, 1971 – January 6, 1993
- Preceded by: John T. McCutcheon
- Succeeded by: Rosa Franklin
- In office January 9, 1961 – November 1967
- Preceded by: Gerald G. Dixon
- Succeeded by: Paul E. Bentley

Member of the Pierce County Council from the 5th district
- In office May 1, 1981 – January 1, 1983
- Preceded by: Constituency established
- Succeeded by: Wendell B. Brown

Mayor of Tacoma, Washington
- In office November 21, 1967 – January 1970
- Preceded by: Harold M. Tollefson
- Succeeded by: Gordon Johnston

Member of the Washington House of Representatives from the 28th district
- In office January 8, 1945 – January 9, 1961
- Preceded by: Winifred C. P. Meddins
- Succeeded by: W. J. O’Connell

Personal details
- Born: Albert Lawrence Rasmussen; October 10, 1909 Everett, Washington, U.S.
- Died: January 6, 1993 (aged 83) Tacoma, Washington, U.S.
- Party: Democratic

Albert Lawrence "Slim" Rasmussen (October 10, 1909 – January 6, 1993) was an American politician in the state of Washington. He served in the Washington House of Representatives from 1949 to 1961 for district 28, and in the Senate from 1961 to his resignation in November 1967 due to his election as Mayor of Tacoma. He served again in the Senate from October 1971 to fill the unexpired term of John T. McCutcheon, and would serve until his death on January 7, 1993

== Washington House ==
From 1949 to 1961, Rasmussen represented district 28 in the Washington House of Representatives.

== Washington Senate, first tenure (1961–67) ==
In 1960, Rasmussen was elected a to the 29th district seat on the Washington Senate. He served until November 1967, when he resigned to become mayor of Tacoma. The district represented the southern areas of Tacoma, Washington.

Prior to the 1968 elections, Rasmussen's home was gerrymandered out of the 29th district and into the Republican-favoring 28th district. Senate Majority Leader Bob Greive creating a new map that established the "Rasmussen Stovepipe", a gerrymandering form which ran through the center of Tacoma in order to draw The Democratic Rasmussen's home on the city's southeast side into the heavily-Republican areas of the Washington 28th district (which primarily represented the suburban community of Lakewood, Washington). Rasmunssen opted to forgo re-election to the senate, and instead seek the mayoralty of Tacoma.

== Mayor of Tacoma (1967–70) ==
After being gerrymandered out of his state senate district, Rasmussen ran for mayor of Tacoma in 1967. A lawsuit was filed to keep him off the ballot, but it was dismissed by the Pierce County Superior Court and ultimately aided in energizing his candidacy. Rasmussen ran on a successful slate of candidates who were outsiders to the city's political establishment.

Rasmussen's candidacy sought to energize the blue collar voters in South Tacoma, and focused his criticisms upon federal programs he considered to be wasteful spending. He also characterized the city charter's council-manager system, and accused the incumbent city manager, David Rowlands, of "dictatorial" leadership amid incumbent mayor Harold M. Tollefson's travels away from the city as president of the National League of Cities.

In the November election, Rasmussen defeated Tollefson, winning a large margin of victory.

Rasmussen's mayoralty featured prominent fights between him (along with his allies) and City Manager Rowlands. Rasussen and his allies also pursued efforts to reform the city charter. Young progressives organized in opposition to these efforts. Action Committee for Tacoma (ACT) was formed to recruit opponents to Rasmussen and his allies in the 1969 city elections. This organization was led initially by Republican State Senator Larry Faulk and local attorneys Thomas Fishburn and Richard Turner. In the 1969 mayoral election, Rasmussen was unseated narrowly (Note: Johonston defeated Johnston by a margin of 440 votes of the 43,824 total votes cast) by first-time candidate Gordon Johnston, an architect who was serving as chair of the city's planning commission. The 1969 election saw unprecedented turnout for a Tacoma city election, and still saw five of Rasmussen's allies re-elected to the council. Understanding that these five councilors would vote to fire him as city manager, Rowlands resigned from office soon after the election. Having lost re-election, Rasmussen left office as mayor in January 1970.

Subsequent to Rasmussen leaving office, his five remaining council allies maneuvered to appoint Floyd Oles (a Rasmussen ally) as the new council manager through a suspension of normal council rules, blindsiding other council members and Mayor Johnston. Oles had a brief and controversial tenure as council president, being fired after the same five councilors suspended rules at a June 30 council meeting to do so. The episode generated backlash, and the five councilors were recalled by voters in September 1970 (with Oles publicly endorsing the recall).

== Washington Senate, second tenure (1971–93) ==
In October 1971, Rasmussen rejoined the Washington Senate, having been elected in a special election to fill the 29th district seat left vacant by the death of John T. McCutcheon. Rasmussen would represent this district until his own death in 1993.

From 1981 until 1983, Rasmussen also held the district 5 seat on the Pierce County Council.

From January 1987 until January 1988, Rasmussen was the president pro tempore of the Washington Senate.

== Notes ==
Washington State Senate
Preceded by Barney Goltz	President pro tempore of the Washington Senate; 1987–1988	Succeeded by Alan Bluechel
