= Barney Goltz =

American politician (1924–2008)

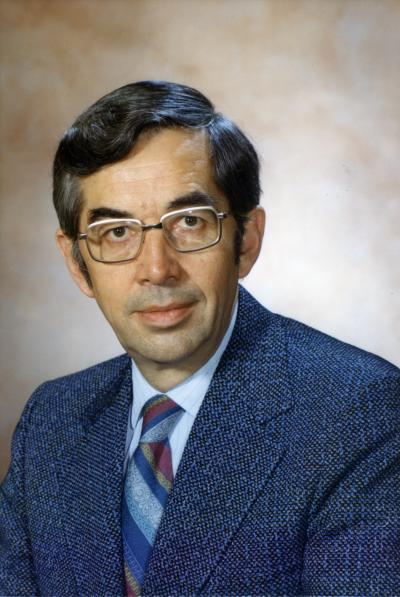
- Goltz in 1973

President pro tempore of the Washington Senate
- In office January 10, 1983 – January 12, 1987
- Preceded by: Sam C. Guess
- Succeeded by: A. L. Rasmussen
- In office January 12, 1981 – February 13, 1981
- Preceded by: Al B. Henry
- Succeeded by: Sam C. Guess

Member of the Washington Senate from the 42nd district
- In office January 13, 1975 – January 12, 1987
- Preceded by: R. Frank Atwood
- Succeeded by: Ann Anderson

Member of the Washington House of Representatives from the 42nd district
- In office January 8, 1973 – January 13, 1975
- Preceded by: Dr. Caswell J. Farr
- Succeeded by: Mary Kay Becker

Personal details
- Born: August 13, 1924 Balaton, Minnesota, U.S.
- Died: December 25, 2008 (aged 84) Olympia, Washington, U.S.
- Party: Democratic
- Spouse: Marguerite Nauss Goltz
- Children: Jeff Goltz
- Education: University of Minnesota, Macalester College
- Occupation: Washington State Senator, Washington State Representative, Director of Planning for Western Washington University

Harold A. (Barney) Goltz (August 13, 1924 – December 25, 2008) was an American politician in the state of Washington. Goltz attended Macalester College in St. Paul, Minnesota and graduated in 1945. While at Macalester, he worked on the campaign of his professor, Hubert Humphrey for Mayor of Minneapolis. He went on to get a master's degree in student affairs at the University of Minnesota.

Goltz moved to Washington state in 1957. He held several positions at Western Washington University including Director of Student Activities, Assistant to the President and Director of Planning. He served in the Washington House of Representatives from 1973 to 1975 for district 42, and in the Senate from 1975 to 1987. Goltz became president pro tem of the Senate before retiring.

Washington State Senate
Preceded by Sam C. Guess	President pro tempore of the Washington Senate; 1983–1987	Succeeded by A. L. Rasmussen
