= Wesley Lloyd =

American politician

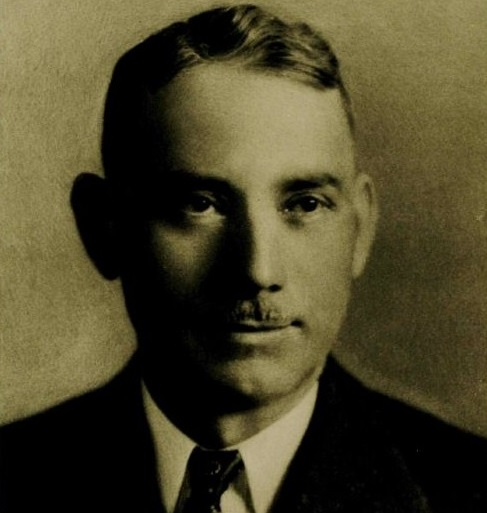
- Lloyd as depicted in the Pictorial Directory of the 74th Congress

Member of the U.S. House of Representatives from Washington's 6th district
- In office March 4, 1933 – January 10, 1936
- Preceded by: Constituency established
- Succeeded by: John M. Coffee

Personal details
- Born: July 24, 1883 Osage County, Kansas, U.S.
- Died: January 10, 1936 (aged 52) Washington, D.C., U.S.
- Resting place: Tacoma Cemetery, Tacoma, Washington
- Party: Democratic
- Spouse: Iva Reedy (m. 1910)
- Children: 3
- Education: Kansas City Law School
- Profession: Journalist; Attorney

Military service
- Allegiance: United States; State of Washington
- Service: Washington National Guard
- Years of service: April 16, 1918 – April 8, 1920
- Rank: Corporal
- Unit: Company F, 3rd Washington Infantry Regiment

Wesley Lloyd (July 24, 1883 – January 10, 1936) was an American attorney and politician from Tacoma, Washington. A Democrat, he was most notable for his service as a U.S. representative from 1933 to 1936.

== Early life ==
Lloyd was born in Arvonia, Osage County, Kansas, on July 24, 1883, the son of John Q. Lloyd and Mary Anne (Roberts) Lloyd. (Note: Arvonia was established in 1869. By the early 1900s, it had become largely depopulated after railroad construction bypassed the town.) He graduated from the schools of Osage County, then attended Baker University, Baldwin, Kansas, and Washburn College.

== Career ==
Lloyd became a newspaper reporter and worked for papers in Kansas City, Missouri, Topeka, Kansas, and Butte, Montana. While working as a reporter, Lloyd attended courses at the Kansas City Law School. He received his LL.B. degree in 1906, was admitted to the bar, and moved to Tacoma, Washington, where he worked as a reporter while establishing a law practice.

In 1908, he began the full-time practice of law and was the unsuccessful Democratic nominee for prosecuting attorney of Pierce County. In 1910, he ran unsuccessfully for a seat in the Washington House of Representatives. During World War I, Lloyd joined Company F, 3rd Infantry Regiment, a unit of the Washington National Guard. He served from 1918 to 1920, and attained the rank of corporal. In 1920, he was again the unsuccessful Democratic nominee for county prosecutor. In 1924, Lloyd was an unsuccessful candidate for judge of the Washington Superior Court.

In 1931, Lloyd was appointed a special assistant prosecuting attorney for Thurston County, a role in which he served without pay. He also continued to serve as one of the leaders of the Democratic Party in Pierce County, including as president of the county's Men's Democratic Club.

== U.S. Congress ==
In 1932 Lloyd was elected to the United States House of Representatives. He was reelected in 1934, and served in the 73rd and 74th Congresses (from March 4, 1933 until his death). During his congressional service, Lloyd served on the Judiciary Committee and was appointed to a leadership role as regional whip for Washington, Oregon, and California.

Serving in Congress during the economic downturn of the Great Depression, on May 9, 1933, Lloyd proposed an unsuccessful constitutional amendment that would have placed a maximum limit on individual net worth. Lloyd died in Washington, D.C. on January 10, 1936. He was interred at Tacoma Cemetery in Tacoma.

== Personal life ==
In 1910, Lloyd married Iva Reedy of Spokane, Washington. They were the parents of three children.

Lloyd was a hunter and fisherman, and carried out several lengthy excursions to remote areas of western Washington. He was active in civic organizations, and was a member of the Fraternal Order of Eagles and Benevolent and Protective Order of Elks. Lloyd was also active in Freemasonry, and he belonged to the Shriners and Order of the Eastern Star, in addition to receiving the 32nd degree of the Scottish Rite.

== See also ==
- List of members of the United States Congress who died in office (1900–1949)

== Notes ==
U.S. House of Representatives
| Preceded by New district formed after 1930 census | Member of the U.S. House of Representatives from Washington's 6th congressional district 1933-1936 | Succeeded by John M. Coffee |
