= Norm Dicks =

American politician (born 1940)

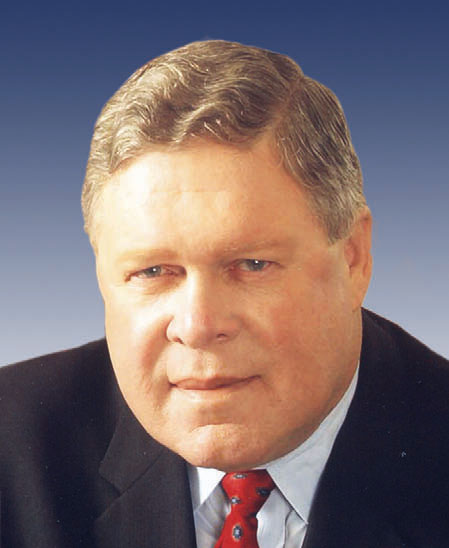
- Official portrait, 2005

Member of the U.S. House of Representatives from Washington's 6th district
- In office January 3, 1977 – January 3, 2013
- Preceded by: Floyd Hicks
- Succeeded by: Derek Kilmer

Personal details
- Born: Norman DeValois Dicks; December 16, 1940 (age 85) Bremerton, Washington, U.S.
- Party: Democratic
- Spouse: Suzanne Callison (m. 1967)
- Children: 2
- Education: University of Washington (BA, JD)
- Dicks's voice Dicks supporting the Hoh Indian Tribe Safe Homelands Act. Recorded June 8, 2010

Norman DeValois Dicks (born December 16, 1940) is an American lawyer and politician who served as the U.S. representative for Washington's 6th congressional district, between 1977 and 2013. He is a member of the Democratic Party. His district was located in the northwestern corner of the state, and includes most of Tacoma. He retired at the end of the 112th Congress. He currently serves as Senior Policy Advisor at the law and public policy firm Van Ness Feldman LLP. He is the longest-serving member ever of the United States House of Representatives from the state of Washington.

== Early life, education, and early political career ==
Norm Dicks was born and raised in Bremerton, Washington. His family attended Our Saviour's Lutheran Church in Bremerton, and he was confirmed there as a teenager. He attended the University of Washington, where he was a linebacker on the Huskies football team and was a member of Sigma Nu fraternity. He earned a B.A. and a J.D. degree there.

After college, he became legislative and administrative assistant to long-serving U.S. Senator Warren G. Magnuson of Washington.

== U.S. House of Representatives ==
=== Elections ===
In 1976, incumbent Democrat U.S. Representative Floyd Hicks decided to retire to run for a Washington State Supreme Court seat. Dicks qualified for the general election via the blanket primary and won the general election with 74% of the vote against Republican nominee Rob Reynolds. He won re-election 17 more times and only got less than 58% of the vote in a November general election once (1980). That year, he defeated Republican nominee Jim Beaver 54% to 46%, the lowest winning percentage and margin of victory in his career. His second lowest general election winning percentage is 58%, in 1994 and 2010 (both years when Republicans took back the majority).

=== Tenure ===
Elected to the House in 1976, he won a coveted seat on the House Appropriations Committee in his first term. He became a "powerful . . . senior Democrat" on that committee. He also served for 8 years on the House Intelligence Committee. As a member of Congress, he was known as a close friend of Al Gore.

On March 28, 1981, Norm Dicks attended the christening of the USS Bremerton (SSN 698) along with U.S. Senator Henry M. Jackson.

On October 10, 2002, Norm Dicks was among the 81 House Democrats who voted in favor of authorizing the invasion of Iraq but later changed his position and supports an end to the war. With Boeing a major employer in Washington, Dicks has also supported the acquisition of military aircraft on the Defense Appropriations Subcommittee.

On October 22, 2004, Dicks cut the ribbon during the dedication ceremony for the Norm Dicks Government Center in Bremerton, Washington. On June 9, 2007, he presented the 132nd commencement speech at the University of Washington. Recently, Congressman Dicks was given the 2008 Ansel Adams Conservation Award by The Wilderness Society, and in 2010, Congressman Dicks was the first recipient of Washington non-profit Long Live the King's annual Lifetime Achievement Award in Salmon Conservation.

In June 2007, Dicks expressed support for a House of Representatives bill that would increase funding for environmental protection, national parks and conservation by approximately $1.2 billion. In support of the bill, he said "The Bush administration has cut the Interior Department budget over the last six to seven years by 16 percent..."It has cut EPA by 29 percent. It has cut the Forest Service by 35 percent. It has devastated these agencies...We are trying to turn the corner, to bring these agencies back". In 2008 the U.S. Navy Memorial Foundation awarded Congressman Dicks its Naval Heritage Award for his support of the U S Navy and military during his terms in Congress on the Appropriations Committee.

On May 8, 2008, Norm Dicks voted yes on H.R. 4279: Prioritizing Resources and Organization for Intellectual Property Act of 2007, sometimes called the PRO-IP Act. The PRO-IP Act increases both civil and criminal penalties for trademark and copyright infringement. It has created a new executive branch office, the Office of the United States Intellectual Property Enforcement Representative (USIPER). In addition to fines, preliminary punishments involve the seizing of unlicensed copies and the devices on which the copies are stored.

On June 20, 2008, Representative Dicks voted yes on the controversial FISA Amendments Act of 2008. The bill would provide immunity for AT&T, Verizon Communications and other U.S. telecommunications companies against 40 lawsuits alleging that they violated customers' privacy rights by helping the government's NSA electronic surveillance program conduct a warrantless spying program after the September 11th attacks.

The bill also sought to:

- Require FISA court permission to wiretap Americans who are overseas.
- Prohibit targeting a foreigner to secretly eavesdrop on an American's calls or e-mails without court approval.
- Allow the FISA court 30 days to review existing but expiring surveillance orders before renewing them.
- Allow eavesdropping in emergencies without court approval, provided the government files required papers within a week.
- Prohibit the government from invoking war powers or other authorities to supersede surveillance rules in the future.

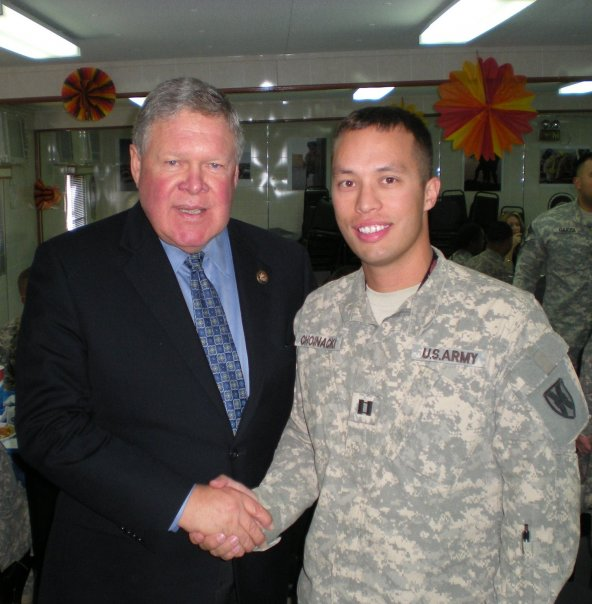
Congressman Norm Dicks greets a US Army soldier from Washington's 6th District at Camp Arifjan, Kuwait in 2010.

=== Committee assignments ===
- Committee on Appropriations (Ranking Member)
  - As ranking member of the full committee, Rep. Dicks was entitled to sit as an ex officio member of all subcommittees.
  - Subcommittee on Defense (Ranking Member)

=== Caucus memberships ===
- International Conservation Caucus (Co-chair)
- Sportsmen's Caucus
- Congressional Arts Caucus

== Retirement and ongoing civic engagement ==
When deciding to retire from Congress in 2012, Dicks said his biggest regret was voting for the Iraq War. "I'm still glad Saddam Hussein is not there, but I feel we were misled, not intentionally misled, but we were not given accurate information, and if we had known Saddam Hussein did not have weapons of mass destruction, I don't think Congress would even have been asked to vote on that."

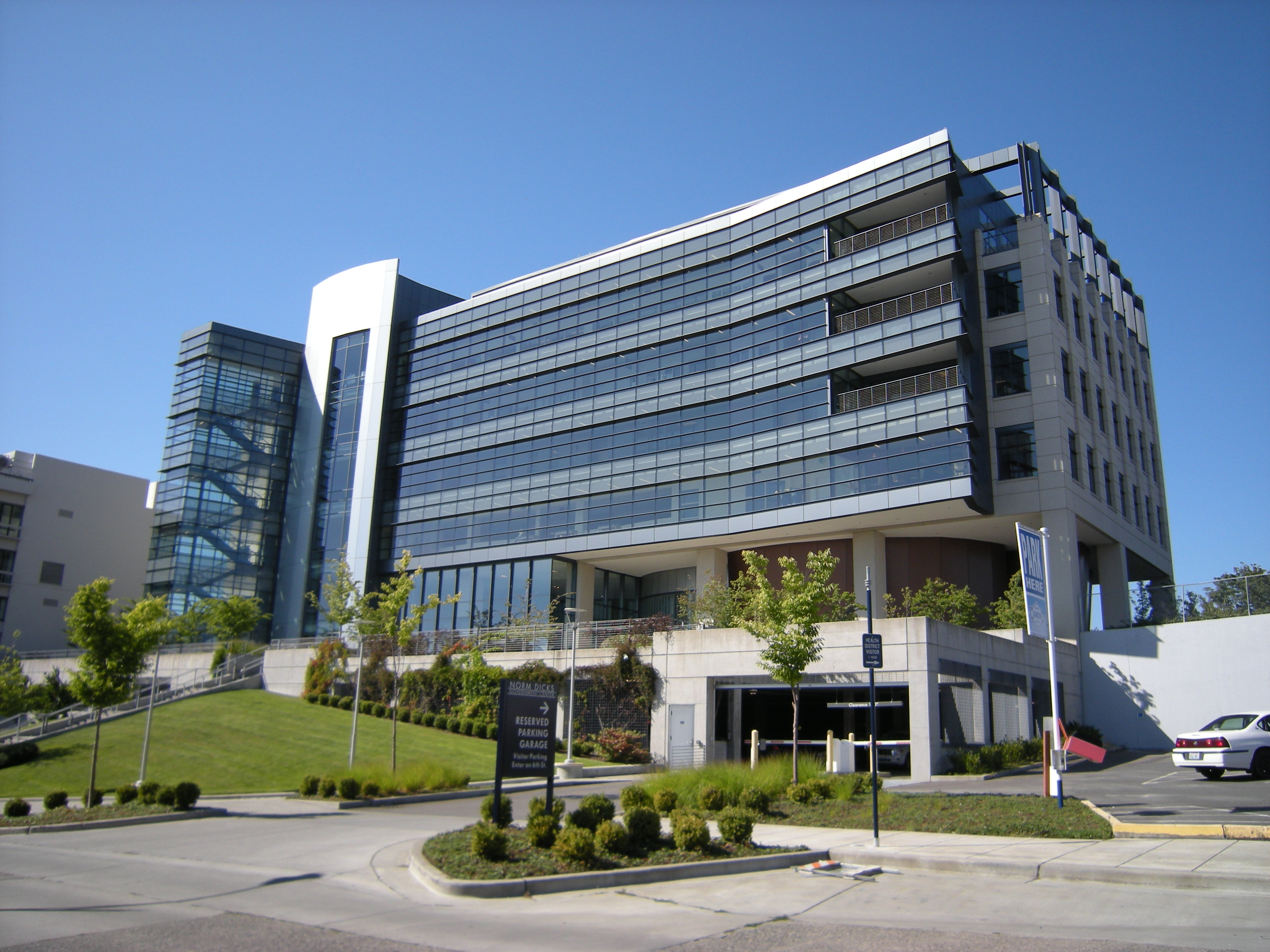
Norm Dicks Government Center in Bremerton, Washington

In 2013, the former congressman joined the board of the Seattle non-profit Long Live the Kings as an Ambassador to a new U.S./Canada partnership, the Salish Sea Marine Survival project, stating that: "Efforts like the joint US/Canada Salish Sea Marine Survival Project promise to fundamentally change our knowledge about salmon and steelhead in saltwater; filling a crucial information-gap that has inhibited the progress of recovery." In 2014, Dicks was elected to the board of directors of the National Bureau of Asian Research.

== Electoral history ==
Washington's 6th congressional district: Results 1976–2010
Year	Democrat	Votes	%	Republican	Votes	%	Third party	Party	Votes	%	Third party	Party	Votes	%
1976	Norm Dicks	137,964	73%	Robert Reynolds	47,539	25%	Michael Duane	U.S. Labor	2,251	1%				
1978	Norm Dicks	71,057	61%	James Beaver	43,640	37%	Mary Smith	Socialist Workers	2,043	2%				
1980	Norm Dicks	122,903	54%	James Beaver	106,236	46%								
1982	Norm Dicks	89,985	63%	Ted Haley	47,720	33%	Jayne Anderson	Independent	6,193	4%				
1984	Norm Dicks	124,367	66%	Mike Lonergan	60,721	32%	Dan Blachly	Libertarian	2,953	2%				
1986	Norm Dicks	90,063	71%	Don McDonald	36,410	29%								
1988	Norm Dicks	125,904	68%	Kevin Cook	60,346	32%								
1990	Norm Dicks	79,079	61%	Bert Mueller	49,786	39%								
1992	Norm Dicks	152,933	69%	Lauri Phillips	49,786	22%	Tom Donnelly	Independent	14,490	7%	Jim Horrigan	Libertarian	4,075	2%
1994	Norm Dicks	105,480	58%	Benjamin Gregg	75,322	42%								
1996	Norm Dicks	155,467	66%	Bill Tinsley	71,337	30%	Ted Haley	Independent	5,561	2%	Jim Horrigan	Libertarian	4,075	2%
1998	Norm Dicks	143,308	68%	Bob Lawrence	66,291	32%								
2000	Norm Dicks	164,853	65%	Bob Lawrence	79,215	31%	John Bennett	Libertarian	10,645	4%				
2002	Norm Dicks	126,116	64%	Bob Lawrence	61,584	31%	John Bennett	Libertarian	8,744	4%				
2004	Norm Dicks	202,919	69%	Doug Cloud	91,228	31%								
2006	Norm Dicks	158,202	71%	Doug Cloud	63,883	29%								
2008	Norm Dicks	205,991	67%	Doug Cloud	102,081	33%								
2010	Norm Dicks	151,873	58%	Doug Cloud	109,800	42%								

U.S. House of Representatives
Preceded by Floyd Hicks	Member of the U.S. House of Representatives from Washington's 6th congressional district 1977–2013	Succeeded by Derek Kilmer
Preceded by Larry Combest	Ranking Member of the House Intelligence Committee; 1995–1999	Succeeded by Nancy Pelosi
Preceded by Jerry Lewis	Ranking Member of the House Appropriations Committee; 2011–2013	Succeeded by Nita Lowey
U.S. order of precedence (ceremonial)
Preceded by Peter DeFazio as Former U.S. Representative	Order of precedence of the United States as Former U.S. Representative	Succeeded by Frank Wolf as Former U.S. Representative
