= Fred A. Adams =

American politician from Washington

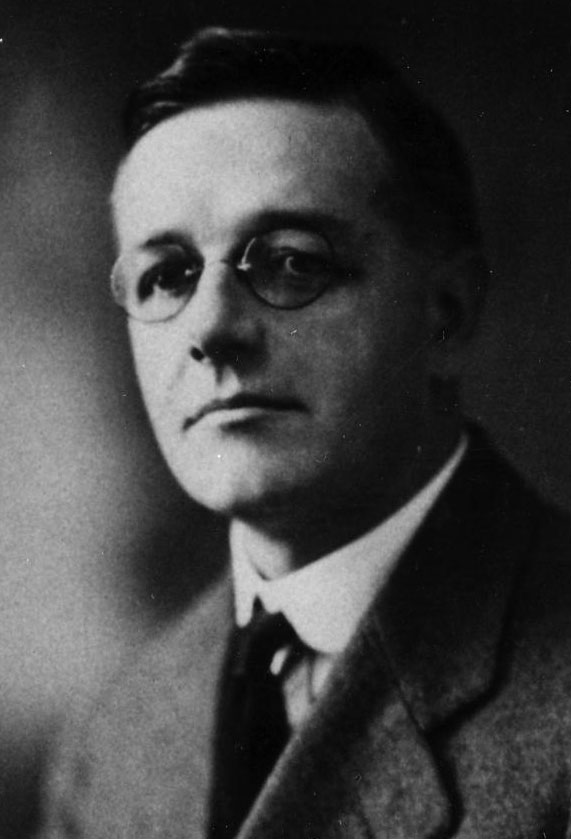
- Fred A. Adams in 1919

15th Speaker of the Washington House of Representatives
- In office January 13, 1919 – January 10, 1921
- Preceded by: Guy E. Kelly
- Succeeded by: E. H. Guie

Member of the Washington House of Representatives from the 6th district
- In office 1917–1921

Personal details
- Born: April 1, 1882 Cherry Creek, Nevada, U.S.
- Died: February 10, 1941 (aged 58) Spokane, Washington, U.S.
- Party: Republican
- Occupation: Politician

Frederick Archibald Adams (April 1, 1882 – February 10, 1941) was an American politician in the state of Washington. He served in the Washington House of Representatives. From 1919 to 1921, he was the Speaker of that body.
