= W. W. Conner =

American politician

William Wallace Conner
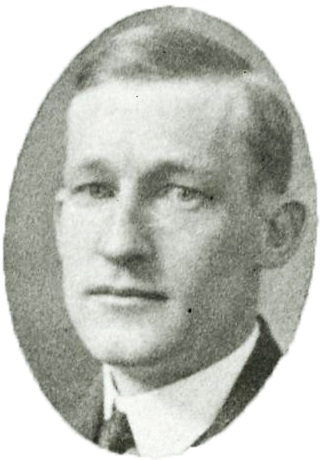
- Conner in 1917

13th Speaker of the Washington House of Representatives
- In office January 11, 1915 – January 8, 1917
- Preceded by: Howard D. Taylor
- Succeeded by: Guy E. Kelly

Member of the Washington House of Representatives
- In office 1911–1917 (51st district); 1919–1921 (44th district)

Member of the Washington State Senate for the 34th district
- In office 1923–1931

Personal details
- Born: William Wallace Conner; November 7, 1882 Oakland, California, United States
- Died: August 9, 1938 (aged 55) Seattle, Washington, United States
- Party: Republican
- Spouse: Martha Mabel Gipple
- Children: none

William Wallace Conner (November 7, 1882 – August 9, 1938) was an American politician in the state of Washington. He served in the Washington House of Representatives and Washington State Senate. He was Speaker of the House from 1915 to 1917.
