= Guy E. Kelly =

American politician (1876–1940)

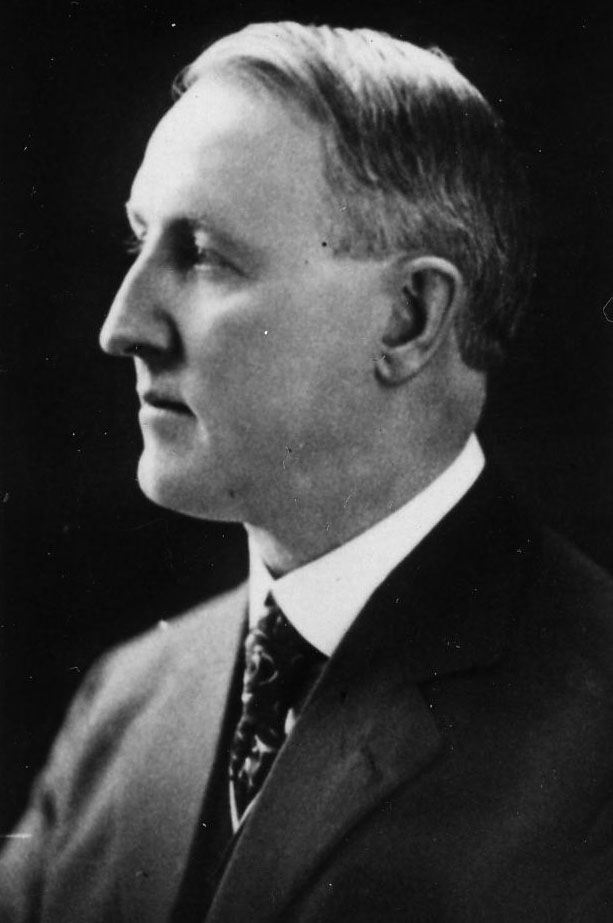
- Kelly in 1917

14th Speaker of the Washington House of Representatives
- In office January 8, 1917 – January 13, 1919
- Preceded by: W. W. Conner
- Succeeded by: Fred A. Adams

Member of the Washington House of Representatives for the 36th district
- In office 1915–1919

Personal details
- Born: May 23, 1876 Minnesota, U.S.
- Died: July 28, 1940 (aged 64) Tacoma, Washington, U.S.
- Party: Republican

Guy Edward Kelly (May 23, 1876 – July 28, 1940) was an American politician in the state of Washington who served in the Washington House of Representatives. between 1917 and 1919, and was speaker of the house.
