= Marjorie Happy =

American politician (1898–1970)

Member of the Washington State Senate from the 6th district
- In office July 17, 1962 – January 14, 1963
- Preceded by: John H. Happy
- Succeeded by: Sam C. Guess

Personal details
- Born: 1898 Durango, Colorado
- Died: 1970 (aged 71–72) Hayden Lake, Idaho
- Party: Republican
- Spouse: John H. Happy (died 1962)
- Children: 1
- Occupation: Homemaker

Marjorie B. Happy (1898 – August 1, 1970) was a Republican politician from Washington who served as a member of the Washington State Senate from the 6th district from 1962 to 1963. In 1962, her husband, State Senator John H. Happy, died in office, and she was appointed to serve out the remaining months of his term by the Spokane County Commission. She declined to run for a full term, and was succeeded by Sam C. Guess. Happy died on August 1, 1970.
