= Alan Bluechel =

American politician from Washington

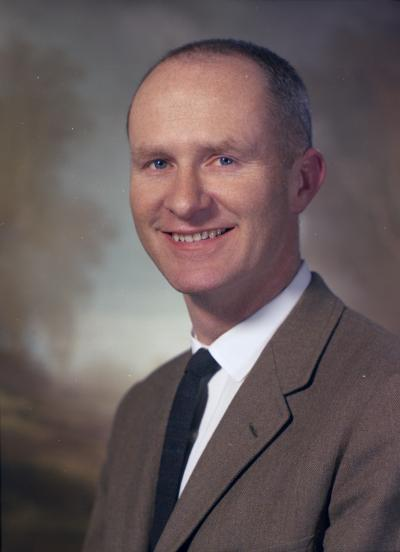
- Bluechel in 1967

President pro tempore of the Washington Senate
- In office January 11, 1988 – January 14, 1991
- Preceded by: A. L. Rasmussen
- Succeeded by: Ellen Craswell

Member of the Washington Senate from the 45th district
- In office January 13, 1975 – January 9, 1995
- Preceded by: Fred H. Dore
- Succeeded by: Bill Finkbeiner

Member of the Washington House of Representatives
- In office January 8, 1973 – January 13, 1975
- Preceded by: Mark Litchman
- Succeeded by: Rod Chandler
- Constituency: 45th
- In office January 9, 1967 – January 8, 1973
- Preceded by: Horace W. Bozarth
- Succeeded by: Arthur C. Brown
- Constituency: 1st

Personal details
- Born: August 28, 1924 Edmonton, Alberta, Canada
- Died: August 20, 2013 (aged 88) Bellevue, Washington, United States
- Party: Republican

Alan Bluechel (August 28, 1924 – August 20, 2013) was an American politician in the state of Washington. He served in the Washington House of Representatives from 1967 to 1975 and in the Senate from 1975 to 1995. He was also a former president pro tempore of the Senate. He was a Republican.

Washington State Senate
Preceded by A. L. Rasmussen	President pro tempore of the Washington Senate; 1988–1991	Succeeded by Ellen Craswell
