= Floyd Hicks =

American judge

Floyd Verne Hicks
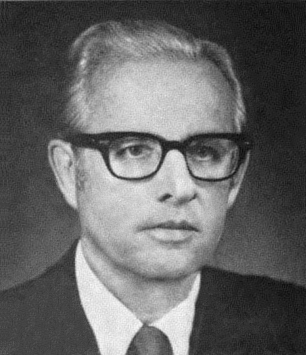

Associate Justice of the Washington Supreme Court
- In office 1977–1982

Member of the U.S. House of Representatives from Washington's 6th district
- In office January 3, 1965 – January 3, 1977
- Preceded by: Thor C. Tollefson
- Succeeded by: Norm Dicks

Personal details
- Born: Floyd Verne Hicks; May 29, 1915 Prosser, Washington, U.S.
- Died: December 1, 1992 (aged 77) Tacoma, Washington, U.S.
- Party: Democratic
- Education: Central Washington University (B.Ed); University of Washington (JD)

Floyd Verne Hicks (May 29, 1915 – December 1, 1992) was an American politician and attorney who served as an associate justice of the Washington Supreme Court and member of the United States House of Representatives.

== Background ==
Hicks was born in Prosser, Washington. He attended Central Washington University, where he earned a bachelor's degree in education. Hicks became a high school teacher and football coach. He continued his education at Washington State University, from which he earned certification as an education administrator.

== Army service ==
After the start of World War II, Hicks joined the United States Army in 1942. He rose to the rank of captain in his four years in the military.

== Career ==
Following his discharge from the Army, Hicks enrolled in the University of Washington School of Law, where he earned a Juris Doctor in 1948. Soon afterward, he established a small private practice in Pierce County, Washington. In 1961, Hicks was chosen as a superior court judge. In 1964, Hicks was elected to United States House of Representatives, where he served on the House Committee on Armed Services. He served six terms, leaving Congress in 1977.

Following his time in Congress, Hicks became an associate justice of the Washington Supreme Court from 1977 to 1982. After he stepped down, he was appointed a judge of the Pierce County Superior Court.

== Sponsored bills ==
Some of the bills he sponsored are listed below. In total, he sponsored 48 bills.

- H.R. 15586 (94th): A bill to provide that the October 1, 1976, pay raise for Federal officers and employees shall be 6 1/2 percent, in lieu of the percentage determined under the pay comparability system, and to exclude Members of Congress from such pay raise.
- H.R. 12754 (94th): A bill for the relief of S. Leon Levy.
- H.R. 12117 (94th): A bill for the relief of Gertrude Faria Young.
- H.R. 11694 (94th): A bill Prescribes for a five-year period the import duty under the U.S. Tariff Schedules on specified soccer uniforms.
- H.R. 11544 (94th): A bill for the relief of Carlos Gregorio Hoff and Jean Hoff Mape.
- H.R. 10831 (94th): A bill to amend the Tariff Schedules of the United States to provide duty-free treatment for softwood veneers imported for use in making plywood.
- H.R. 10014 (94th): A bill to amend the Internal Revenue Code of 1954 to exempt the use of certain punchboards, pull-tabs, and similar devices from the taxes on wagering.
- H.R. 8449 (94th): A bill for the relief of the heirs of Anne E. Scarborough.
- H.R. 8118 (94th): A bill for the relief of Chin-Ho An.

== Death ==
He died on December 1, 1992, in Tacoma, Washington.

U.S. House of Representatives
Preceded by Thor C. Tollefson	Member of the U.S. House of Representatives from Washington's 6th congressional district 1965–1977	Succeeded by Norm Dicks
