= John H. Happy =

American politician (1895–1962)

John Happy

Member of the Washington State Senate from the 6th district
- In office January 13, 1947 – June 22, 1962
- Preceded by: Virgil Warren
- Succeeded by: Marjorie Happy

Personal details
- Born: April 1, 1895 Spokane, Washington
- Died: June 22, 1962 (aged 67) Coeur d'Alene, Idaho
- Party: Republican
- Spouse: Marjorie Happy
- Education: University of Washington
- Occupation: Insurance agent

Military service
- Allegiance: United States
- Branch/service: United States Army
- Battles/wars: World War I

John Harrison Happy (April 1, 1895 – June 22, 1962) was a Republican politician from Washington. He served as a member of the Washington State Senate from the 6th district, which was based in Spokane County, Washington, from 1947 until his death in 1962.
