= Balaton, Minnesota =

City in Minnesota, United States

- City
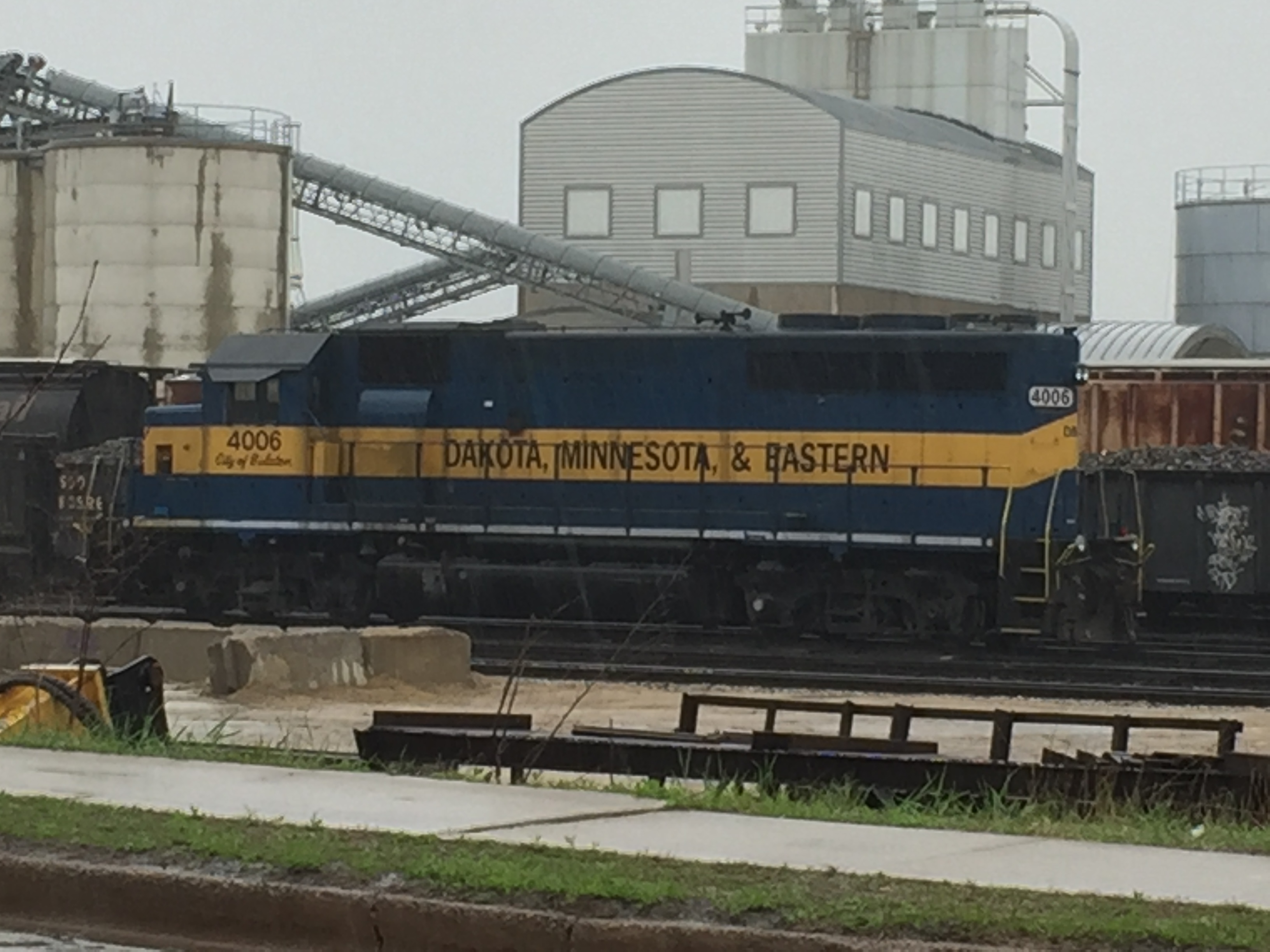

- Location of Balaton, Minnesota
- Coordinates: 44°13′59″N 95°52′15″W
- Country: United States
- State: Minnesota
- County: Lyon

Government
  - Type: Mayor – Council
  - Mayor: Lonnie Lambertus

Area
  - Total: 1.58 sq mi (4.10 km^{2})
  - Land: 1.45 sq mi (3.76 km^{2})
  - Water: 0.13 sq mi (0.34 km^{2})
- Elevation: 1,536 ft (468 m)

Population (2020)
  - Total: 595
  - Density: 410.1/sq mi (158.34/km^{2})
- Time zone: UTC-6 (Central (CST))
  - Summer (DST): UTC-5 (CDT)
- ZIP code: 56115
- Area code: 507
- FIPS code: 27-03250
- GNIS feature ID: 2394053
- Website: www.balatonmn.com

Balaton is a city in Lyon County, Minnesota, United States. As of the 2020 census, Balaton had a population of 595.

== History ==
Balaton was platted in 1879 by the railroad. It was named after Lake Balaton, in Hungary. A post office has been in operation at Balaton since 1879. Balaton was incorporated in 1892.

== Geography ==
According to the United States Census Bureau, the city has a total area of 1.58 square miles (4.09 km^{2}), of which 1.45 square miles (3.76 km^{2}) is land and 0.13 square miles (0.34 km^{2}) is water.

== Demographics ==
Historical population
Census	Pop.	Note	%±
1900	209		—
1910	364		74.2%
1920	664		82.4%
1930	605		−8.9%
1940	713		17.9%
1950	723		1.4%
1960	723		0.0%
1970	649		−10.2%
1980	752		15.9%
1990	737		−2.0%
2000	637		−13.6%
2010	643		0.9%
2020	595		−7.5%
U.S. Decennial Census

=== 2010 census ===
As of the census of 2010, there were 643 people, 273 households, and 168 families living in the city. The population density was 443.4 inhabitants per square mile (171.2/km^{2}). There were 307 housing units at an average density of 211.7 per square mile (81.7/km^{2}). The racial makeup of the city was 97.2% White, 0.5% African American, 0.5% Native American, 0.5% from other races, and 1.4% from two or more races. Hispanic or Latino of any race were 1.7% of the population.

There were 273 households, of which 30.0% had children under the age of 18 living with them, 46.5% were married couples living together, 9.5% had a female householder with no husband present, 5.5% had a male householder with no wife present, and 38.5% were non-families. 33.3% of all households were made up of individuals, and 12.4% had someone living alone who was 65 years of age or older. The average household size was 2.30 and the average family size was 2.92.

The median age in the city was 37.9 years. 26.4% of residents were under the age of 18; 7% were between the ages of 18 and 24; 24.5% were from 25 to 44; 23% were from 45 to 64; and 19.1% were 65 years of age or older. The gender makeup of the city was 47.7% male and 52.3% female.

=== 2000 census ===
As of the census of 2000, there were 637 people, 276 households, and 186 families living in the city. The population density was 468.9 inhabitants per square mile (181.0/km^{2}). There were 296 housing units at an average density of 217.9 per square mile (84.1/km^{2}). The racial makeup of the city was 99.22% White, 0.16% Native American, 0.16% from other races, and 0.47% from two or more races. Hispanic or Latino of any race were 0.78% of the population.

There were 276 households, out of which 28.6% had children under the age of 18 living with them, 51.4% were married couples living together, 12.0% had a female householder with no husband present, and 32.6% were non-families. 30.1% of all households were made up of individuals, and 18.8% had someone living alone who was 65 years of age or older. The average household size was 2.31 and the average family size was 2.80.

In the city, the population was spread out, with 26.2% under the age of 18, 8.0% from 18 to 24, 25.6% from 25 to 44, 18.1% from 45 to 64, and 22.1% who were 65 years of age or older. The median age was 36 years. For every 100 females, there were 87.9 males. For every 100 females age 18 and over, there were 78.7 males.

The median income for a household in the city was $36,442, and the median income for a family was $40,625. Males had a median income of $30,156 versus $21,528 for females. The per capita income for the city was $16,167. About 3.2% of families and 6.0% of the population were below the poverty line, including 3.4% of those under age 18 and 6.9% of those age 65 or over.

== Notable person ==
- Harold A. "Barney" Goltz, Washington State Representative and Senator, 1973 - 1987
