= Sam C. Guess =

American politician (1909–1989)

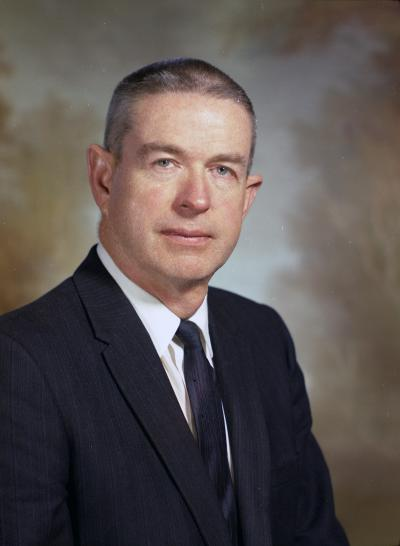
- Guess in 1967

President pro tempore of the Washington Senate
- In office February 13, 1981 – January 10, 1983
- Preceded by: Barney Goltz
- Succeeded by: Barney Goltz

Member of the Washington Senate from the 6th district
- In office January 14, 1963 – January 12, 1987
- Preceded by: Marjorie Happy
- Succeeded by: James E. West

Personal details
- Born: August 8, 1909 Greenwood, Mississippi, U.S.
- Died: June 20, 1989 (aged 79) Spokane, Washington, U.S.
- Party: Republican

Sam C. Guess (August 8, 1909 – June 20, 1989) was an American politician in the state of Washington. He served in the Washington State Senate from 1963 to 1987.

The Division Street Bridge in Spokane, Washington, is officially named the Senator Sam C. Guess Memorial Bridge in his honor.

Washington State Senate
Preceded by Barney Goltz	President pro tempore of the Washington Senate; 1981–1983	Succeeded by Barney Goltz
