= A. J. Pardini =

American politician

A. J. (Bud) Pardini
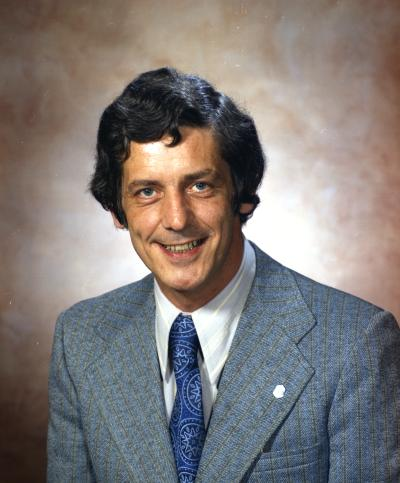
- Pardini in 1973

Member of the Washington House of Representatives for the 6th district
- In office 1969–1979

Personal details
- Born: January 10, 1932 Philadelphia, Pennsylvania, United States
- Died: December 22, 2011 (aged 79) Washington, United States
- Party: Republican

Anthony J. (Bud) Pardini (January 10, 1932 – December 22, 2011) was an American politician in the state of Washington. He served in the Washington House of Representatives from 1953 to 1967 for district 35.
