= Perley, Minnesota =

City in Minnesota, United States

- City
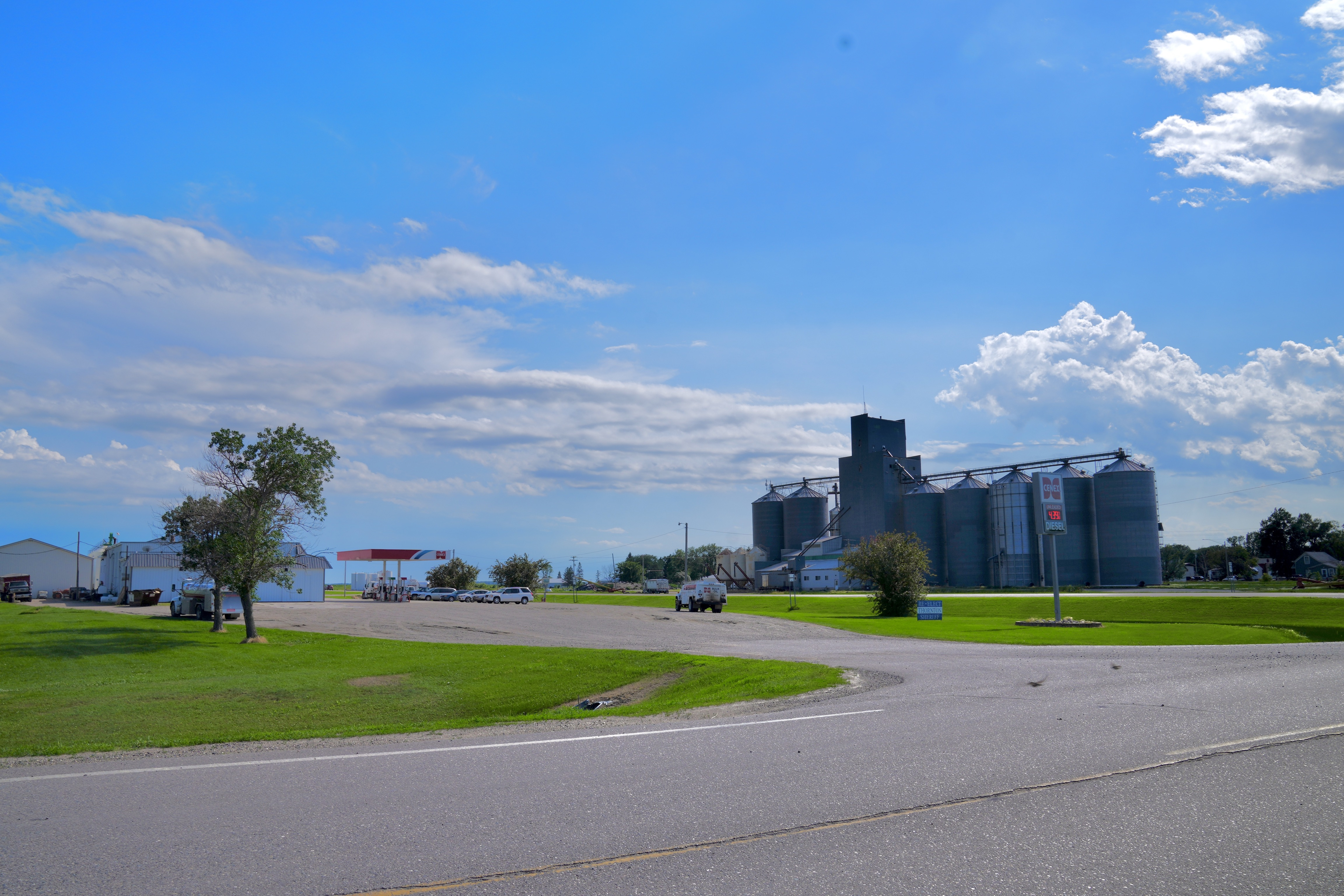
- Perley, Minnesota at the intersection of US Highway 75 and Norman County Highway 39

- Location of Perley, Minnesota
- Coordinates: 47°10′37″N 96°48′11″W
- Country: United States
- State: Minnesota
- County: Norman
- Incorporated: September 27, 1906

Government
  - Mayor: Ann L. Kruse

Area
  - Total: 0.247 sq mi (0.640 km^{2})
  - Land: 0.247 sq mi (0.640 km^{2})
  - Water: 0 sq mi (0.000 km^{2})
- Elevation: 876 ft (267 m)

Population (2020)
  - Total: 113
  - Estimate (2022): 110
  - Density: 456.6/sq mi (176.29/km^{2})
- Time zone: UTC-6 (Central (CST))
  - Summer (DST): UTC-5 (CDT)
- ZIP Code: 56574
- Area code: 218
- FIPS code: 27-50506
- GNIS feature ID: 0649302
- Sales tax: 7.375%

Perley is a city in Norman County, Minnesota, United States. Its population was 113 at the 2020 census.

== History ==
A post office called Perley has been in operation since 1885. The city was named for George Edmund Perley, a local attorney.

== Geography ==
According to the United States Census Bureau, the city has a total area of 0.247 square miles (0.64 km^{2}), all land.

== Demographics ==
Historical population
Census	Pop.	Note	%±
1910	188		—
1920	222		18.1%
1930	231		4.1%
1940	246		6.5%
1950	204		−17.1%
1960	165		−19.1%
1970	149		−9.7%
1980	134		−10.1%
1990	132		−1.5%
2000	121		−8.3%
2010	92		−24.0%
2020	113		22.8%
2022 (est.)	110		−2.7%
U.S. Decennial Census; 2020 Census

As of 2000, the median income for a household in the city was $31,250, and the median income for a family was $35,625. Males had a median income of $21,528 versus $19,063 for females. The per capita income for the city was $13,998. There were 10.5% of families and 12.2% of the population living below the poverty line, including 23.7% of under eighteens and none of those over 64.

=== 2010 census ===
As of the 2010 census, there were 92 people, 48 households, and 28 families residing in the city. The population density was 383.3 inhabitants per square mile (148.0/km^{2}). There were 53 housing units at an average density of 220.8 per square mile (85.3/km^{2}). The racial makeup of the city was 93.5% White, 1.1% Native American, 3.3% from other races, and 2.2% from two or more races. Hispanic or Latino of any race were 7.6% of the population.

There were 48 households, of which 16.7% had children under the age of 18 living with them, 50.0% were married couples living together, 6.3% had a female householder with no husband present, 2.1% had a male householder with no wife present, and 41.7% were non-families. 39.6% of all households were made up of individuals, and 6.3% had someone living alone who was 65 years of age or older. The average household size was 1.92 and the average family size was 2.50.

The median age in the city was 48 years. 15.2% of residents were under the age of 18; 4.3% were between the ages of 18 and 24; 22.8% were from 25 to 44; 39.2% were from 45 to 64; and 18.5% were 65 years of age or older. The gender makeup of the city was 52.2% male and 47.8% female.
