= Elmer E. Johnston =

American politician

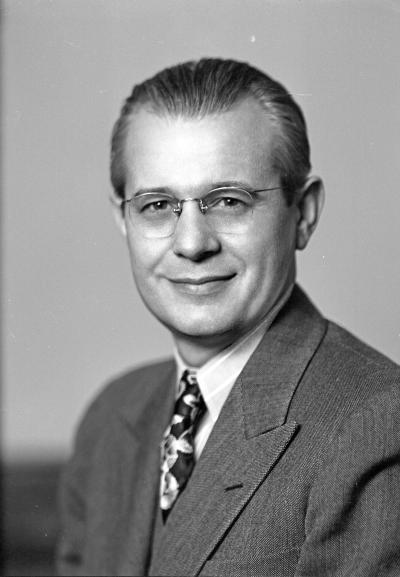
- Johnston in 1947

Speaker pro tempore of the Washington House of Representatives
- In office January 12, 1953 – January 10, 1955
- Preceded by: Office established
- Succeeded by: Julia Butler Hansen

Member of the Washington House of Representatives for the 6th district
- In office 1947–1966

Personal details
- Born: November 22, 1898 Oakesdale, Washington, United States
- Died: November 26, 1985 (aged 87) Everett, Washington, United States
- Party: Republican
- Occupation: Attorney

Elmer E. Johnston (November 22, 1898 – November 26, 1985) was an American politician in the state of Washington. He served in the Washington House of Representatives from 1947 to 1966 for District 6.

== Early life ==
Elmer E. Johnston was born on November 22, 1898, in Oakesdale, Washington. His parents were John Herbert Johnston and Minnie Gertrude Johnston (née Patterson).

Johnston studied at the University of Idaho and the University of Notre Dame, then received his law degree from Georgetown University Law Center. He served in the U.S. Army during World War I.

== Law career ==
Johnston began his law career in 1925 in Idaho's Wallace and Kellogg cities. He served one year as a Shoshone County prosecutor from 1931.

In 1935, Johnston established his own practice in Spokane's Peyton Building. He was the Republican candidate for the city's prosecuting attorney in 1942.

At one point, Johnston served as professor of mining law at Gonzaga University.

== Personal life ==
Johnston was married and had at least three children. He died in Everett's Providence Hospital on November 26, 1985.
