= L. C. Crow =

American politician

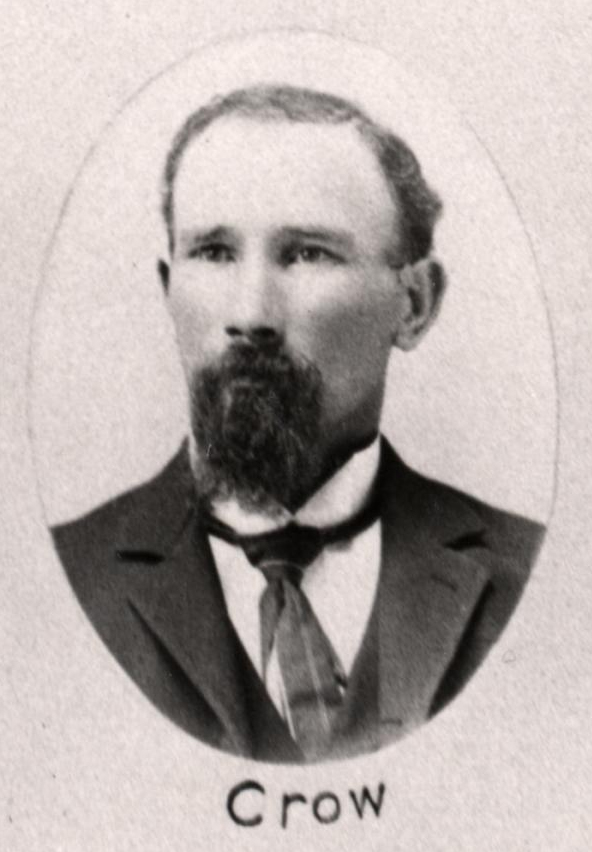
- Crow in 1895

Member of the Washington State Senate for the 6th district
- In office 1895–1899; 1901–1903

Personal details
- Born: November 3, 1851 Johnson County, Indiana, United States
- Died: August 28, 1938 (aged 86) Ramona, California, United States
- Party: Democratic

Lewis Cass Crow (November 3, 1851 – August 28, 1938) was an American politician in the state of Washington. He served in the Washington State Senate from 1895 to 1899 and from 1901 to 1903.
