= 2015 Snohomish County Executive election =

- November 3, 2015
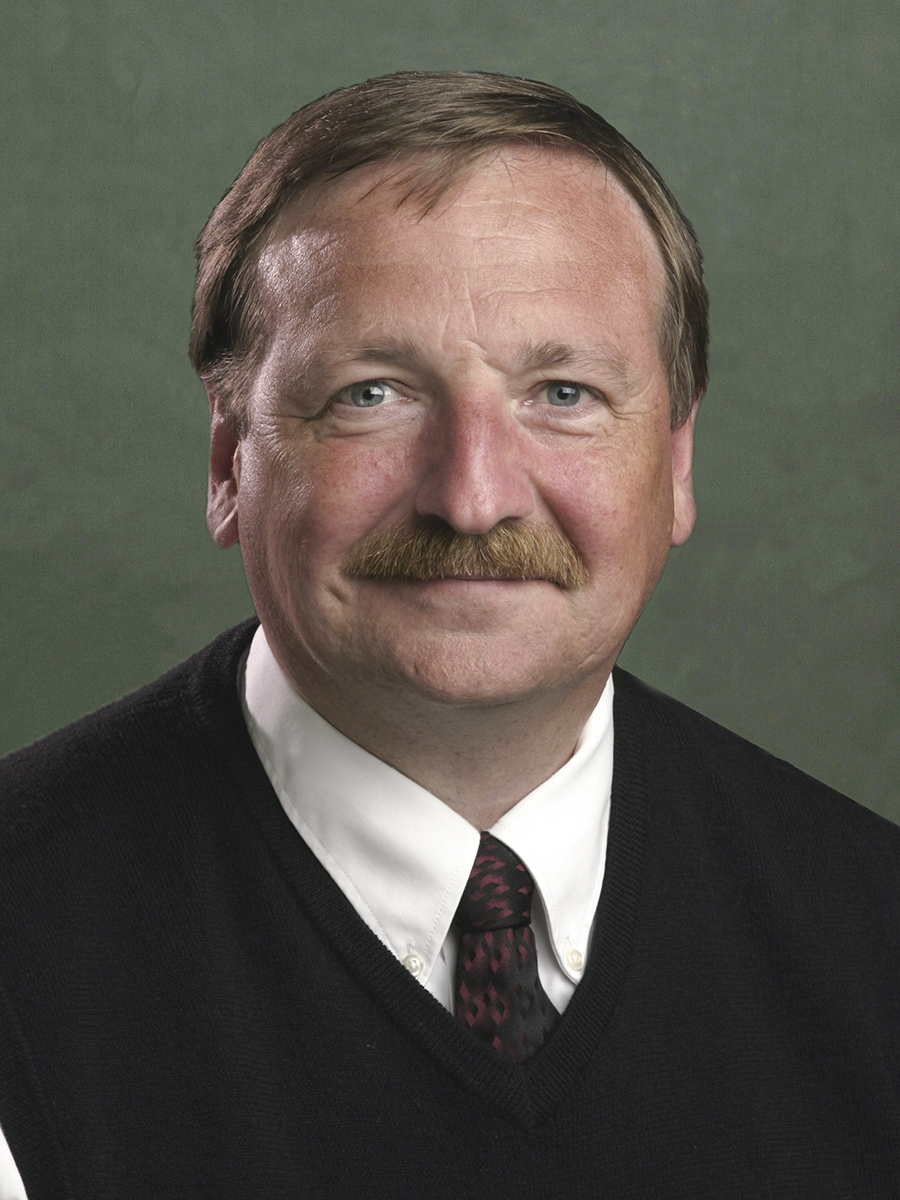

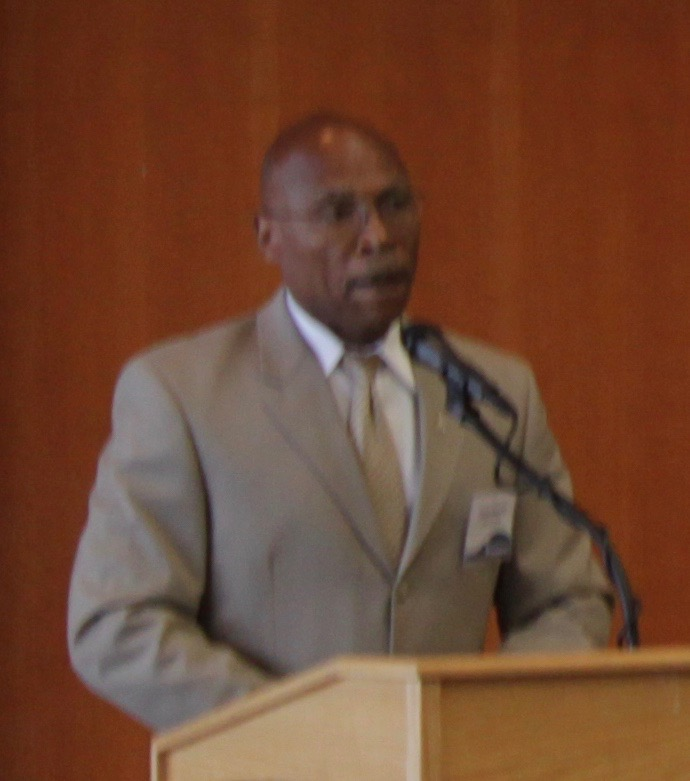
Nominee	Dave Somers	John Lovick
Party	Democratic	Democratic
Popular vote	74,492	56,428
Percentage	56.18%	42.56%
County Executive before election
John Lovick
Democratic
Elected County Executive
Dave Somers
Democratic

The 2015 Snohomish County Executive election took place on November 3, 2015, to elect the county executive of Snohomish County, Washington. Incumbent Democratic County Executive John Lovick, who was first appointed in 2013 and elected in a 2014 special election to serve out the term of Aaron Reardon, ran for re-election to a full term. He was challenged for re-election by four opponents, including Democrat Dave Somers, the Chair of the County Council, and former Republican congressional candidate Robert Sutherland.

In the primary election, Somers narrowly placed first, winning 33 percent of the vote to Lovick's 32 percent and Sutherland's 26 percent. Somers and Lovick advanced to the general election, where Lovick campaigned on his administration's successes in economic development and Somers attacked Lovick for mismanagement of county government.

Somers ultimately defeated Lovick by a wide margin, winning 56 percent of the vote to Lovick's 43 percent.

== Primary election ==
=== Candidates ===
- Dave Somers, County Council Chair (Democratic)
- John Lovick, incumbent County Executive (Democratic)
- Robert Sutherland, retired biochemist, 2014 Republican candidate for Congress (Republican)
- James Robert Deal, attorney, anti-water fluoridation activist, 2014 candidate for County Executive (independent)
- Norm Nunnally, Republican activist (Republican)

=== Results ===
Blanket primary results
Party	Candidate	Votes	%
Democratic	Dave Somers	31,283	32.88%
Democratic	John Lovick (inc.)	30,120	31.66%
Republican	Robert Sutherland	25,033	26.31%
Independent	James Robert Deal	5,148	5.41%
Republican	Norm Nunnally	2,704	2.84%
Write-in		860	0.90%
Total votes		95,148	100.00%

== General election ==
=== Results ===
2015 Snohomish County Executive election
Party	Candidate	Votes	%
Democratic	Dave Somers	74,492	56.18%
Democratic	John Lovick (inc.)	56,428	42.56%
Write-in		1,670	1.26%
Total votes		132,590	100.00%
Democratic hold			
