= 2014 Snohomish County Executive special election =

- November 4, 2014
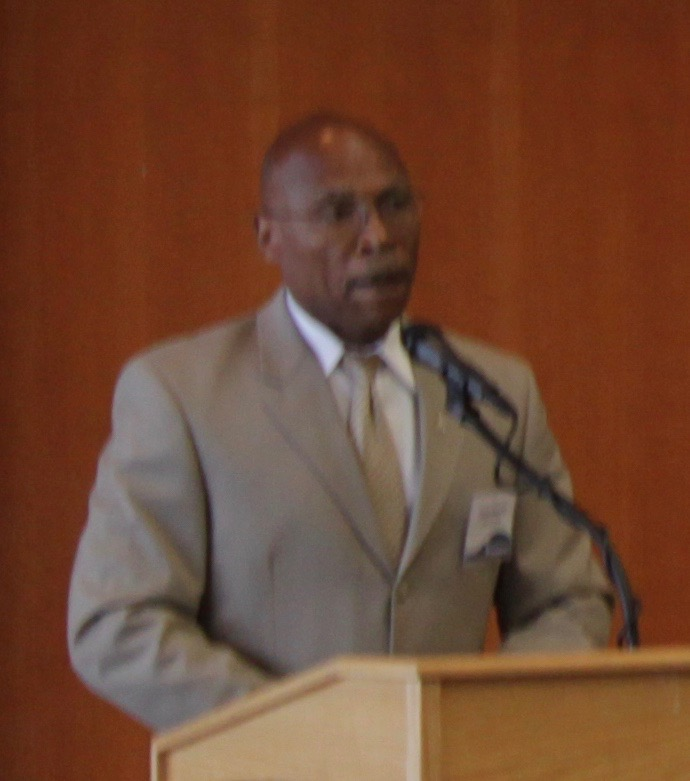

Nominee	John Lovick	Carolyn Eslick
Party	Democratic	Republican
Popular vote	111,837	89,095
Percentage	55.52%	44.23%
County Executive before election
John Lovick
Democratic
Elected County Executive
John Lovick
Democratic

The 2014 Snohomish County Executive special election took place on November 4, 2014, to elect the county executive of Snohomish County, Washington. Shortly following the 2011 election, County Executive Aaron Reardon faced allegations that he had engaged in an extramarital affair and used county resources for his political campaigns. He ultimately resigned on May 31, 2013.

County Sheriff John Lovick was appointed by the County Council to serve as County Executive until the special election, and he ran to serve out the remainder of Reardon's term. He was challenged by Republican Carolyn Eslick, the Mayor of Sultan, and Democrat James Robert Deal, an attorney and anti-fluoridation activist.

In the primary election, Lovick placed first with 46 percent of the vote and advanced to the general election with Eslick, who received 40 percent. Lovick ultimately defeated Eslick by a wide margin, winning 56 percent of the vote to her 44 percent.

== Primary election ==
=== Candidates ===
- John Lovick, incumbent County Executive (Democratic)
- Carolyn Eslick, Mayor of Sultan (Republican)
- James Robert Deal, attorney, anti-water fluoridation activist (Democratic)

=== Results ===
Blanket primary results
Party	Candidate	Votes	%
Democratic	John Lovick (inc.)	48,484	46.39%
Republican	Carolyn Eslick	41,632	39.83%
Democratic	James Robert Deal	13,717	13.12%
Write-in		684	0.65%
Total votes		104,517	100.00%

== General election ==
=== Results ===
2014 Snohomish County Executive election
Party	Candidate	Votes	%
Democratic	John Lovick (inc.)	111,837	55.52%
Republican	Carolyn Eslick	89,095	44.23%
Write-in		486	0.24%
Total votes		201,418	100.00%
Democratic hold			
