= 2003 Snohomish County Executive election =

- November 4, 2003
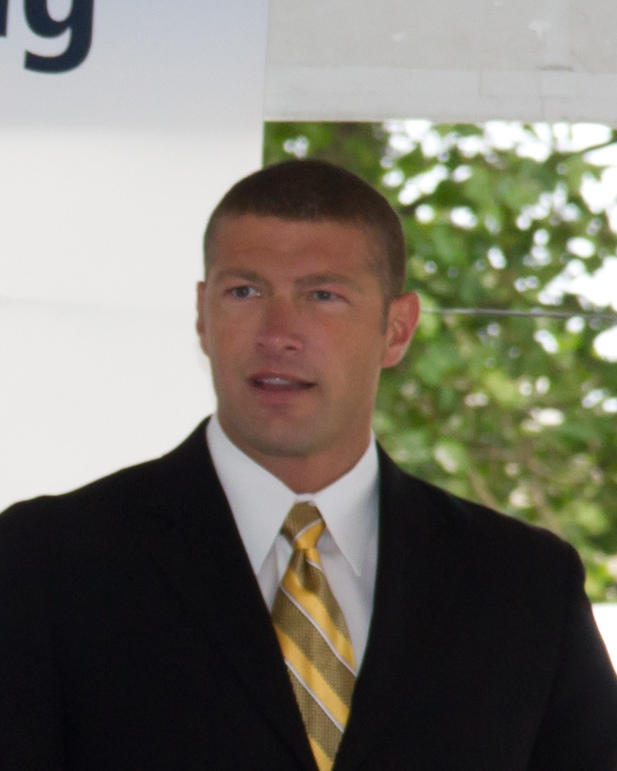

Nominee	Aaron Reardon	Dave Earling
Party	Democratic	Republican
Popular vote	64,068	59,433
Percentage	51.77%	48.03%
County Executive before election
Bob Drewel
Democratic
Elected County Executive
Aaron Reardon
Democratic

The 2003 Snohomish County Executive election took place on November 4, 2003, to elect the county executive of Snohomish County, Washington. Incumbent Democratic County Executive Bob Drewel was term-limited and could not seek re-election to a fourth term. A crowded race developed to succeed him, with six candidates running in total. State Senator Aaron Reardon, former State Senator Kevin Quigley, and prosecutor Millie Judge competed for the nomination, while Edmonds City Council President Dave Earling, businesswoman Betty Neighbors, and entrepreneur Bob McCaughan sought the Republican nomination.

Reardon placed first in the primary, winning 25 percent of the vote. Earling narrowly defeated Neighbors for the Republican nomination, placing second with 22 percent of the vote while Neighbors won 19 percent.

In the general election, Reardon narrowly defeated Earling, winning 52 percent of the vote to Earling's 48 percent, and became the youngest County Executive in county history.

== Primary election ==
=== Candidates ===
- Aaron Reardon, State Senator (Democratic)
- Dave Earling, Edmonds City Council President (Republican)
- Betty Neighbors, businesswoman (Republican)
- Kevin Quigley, former State Senator (Democratic)
- Millie Judge, deputy county prosecuting attorney (Democratic)
- Bob McCaughan, entrepreneur (Republican)

=== Results ===
Blanket primary results
Party	Candidate	Votes	%
Democratic	Aaron Reardon	24,246	25.32%
Republican	Dave Earling	21,010	21.94%
Republican	Betty Neighbors	18,638	19.46%
Democratic	Kevin Quigley	17,396	18.17%
Democratic	Millie Judge	9,753	10.19%
Republican	Bob McCaughan	4,415	4.61%
Write-in		300	0.31%
Total votes		95,758	100.00%

== General election ==
=== Results ===
2003 Snohomish County Executive election
Party	Candidate	Votes	%
Democratic	Aaron Reardon	64,068	51.77%
Republican	Dave Earling	59,433	48.03%
Write-in		246	0.20%
Total votes		123,747	100.00%
Democratic hold			
