= 1995 Snohomish County Executive election =

- November 7, 1995

Nominee	Bob Drewel	Doug Smith
Party	Democratic	Republican
Popular vote	70,921	55,676
Percentage	55.94%	43.91%
County Executive before election
Bob Drewel
Democratic
Elected County Executive
Bob Drewel
Democratic

The 1995 Snohomish County Executive election took place on November 7, 1995, to elect the county executive of Snohomish County, Washington. Incumbent Democratic County Executive Bob Drewel ran for re-election to a second term.

Drewel was challenged for re-election by Republican Doug Smith, an attorney who had unsuccessfully run for County Executive in 1991. Smith ran on a platform of limited government and property rights, arguing that voters "expect that government is supposed to do what they want, and to be subject to their control," but that the "county government is the epitome of the reverse of that." Though Drewel outraised Smith, Smith received campaign contributions from local property rights advocates, and linked his campaign to Referendum 48, which sought to "require[] governments to pay landowners if a government regulation decreases the value of their property."

In the primary election, Drewel placed first by a wide margin, winning 59 percent of the vote. He won re-election in the general election in a landslide, receiving 56 percent of the vote to Smith's 44 percent, a similar margin by which Referendum 48 was rejected in the county.

== Primary election ==
=== Candidates ===
- Bob Drewel, incumbent County Executive (Democratic)
- Dough Smith, attorney, 1991 candidate for County Executive (Republican)

=== Results ===
Blanket primary results
Party	Candidate	Votes	%
Democratic	Bob Drewel (inc.)	67,234	58.60%
Republican	Doug Smith	47,289	41.21%
Write-in		217	0.19%
Total votes		114,740	100.00%

== General election ==
=== Results ===
1995 Snohomish County Executive election
Party	Candidate	Votes	%
Democratic	Bob Drewel (inc.)	70,921	55.94%
Republican	Doug Smith	55,676	43.91%
Write-in		193	0.15%
Total votes		126,790	100.00%
Democratic hold			
