= 2019 Snohomish County Executive election =

- November 5, 2019
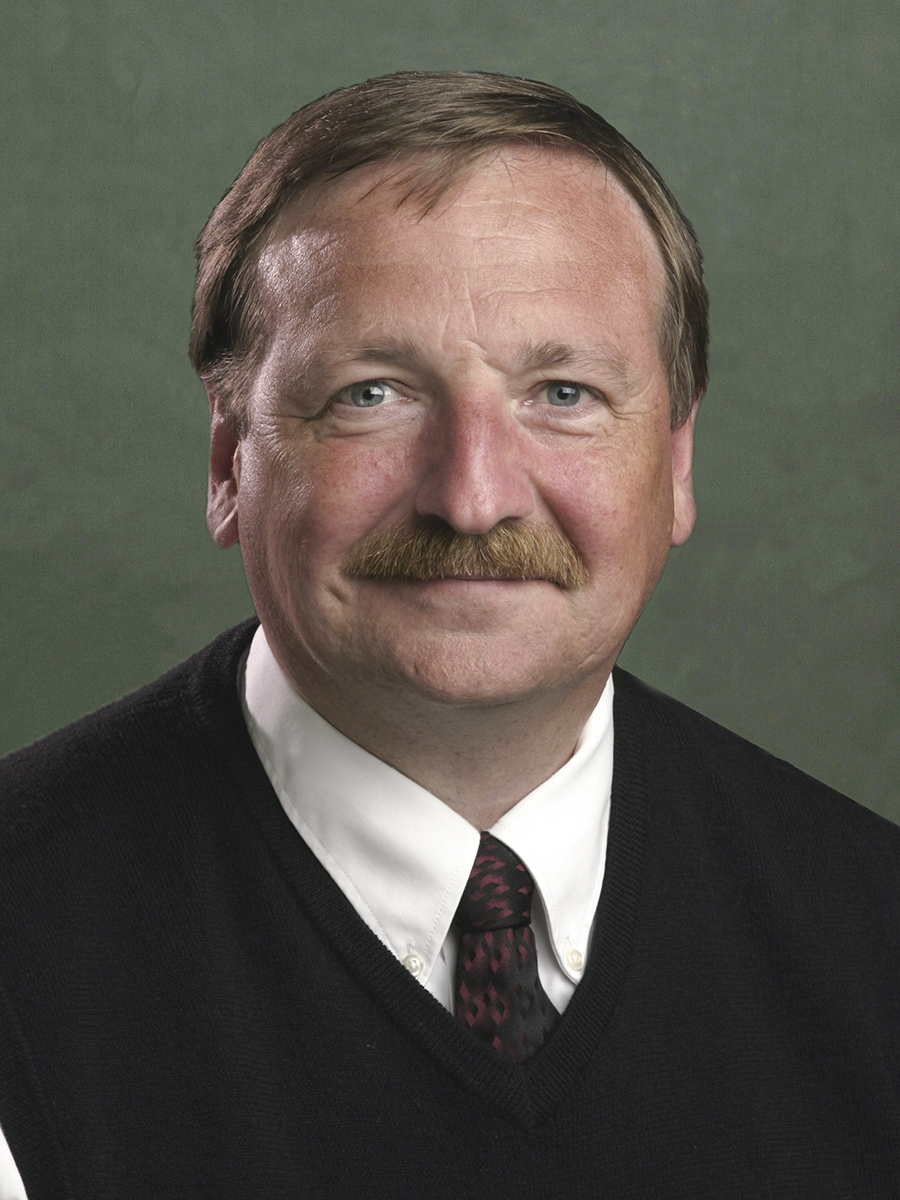
| Nominee | Dave Somers |
| Party | Democratic |
| Popular vote | 134,521 |
| Percentage | 93.94% |
County Executive before election
Dave Somers
Democratic
Elected County Executive
Dave Somers
Democratic

The 2019 Snohomish County Executive election took place on November 5, 2019, to elect the county executive of Snohomish County, Washington. Incumbent Democratic County Executive Dave Somers ran for re-election to a second term.

However, no candidate announced a campaign against Somers by the candidate filing deadline, and he was re-elected unopposed. Though several elected Republicans in the county were interested in running for County Executive in the future, the chairwoman of the county Republican Party said that "[t]here wasn't anybody who wanted to run" against Somers in his bid for a second term.

Somers ultimately received 93 percent of the vote in the primary election, and 94 percent in the general election.

== Primary election ==
=== Candidates ===
- Dave Somers, incumbent County Executive (Democratic)

==== Declined ====
- Sam Low, County Councilman (Republican)
- Nate Nehring, County Councilman (Republican)

=== Results ===
Blanket primary results
| Party | Candidate | Votes | % |
|---|---|---|---|
| Democratic | Dave Somers (inc.) | 85,546 | 93.01% |
| Write-in | | 6,426 | 6.99% |
| Total votes | | 91,972 | 100.00% |

== General election ==
=== Results ===
2019 Snohomish County Executive election
| Party | Candidate | Votes | % |
|---|---|---|---|
| Democratic | Dave Somers (inc.) | 134,521 | 93.94% |
| Write-in | | 8,681 | 6.06% |
| Total votes | | 143,202 | 100.00% |
| Democratic hold | | | |
