= 2007 Snohomish County Executive election =

- November 6, 2007
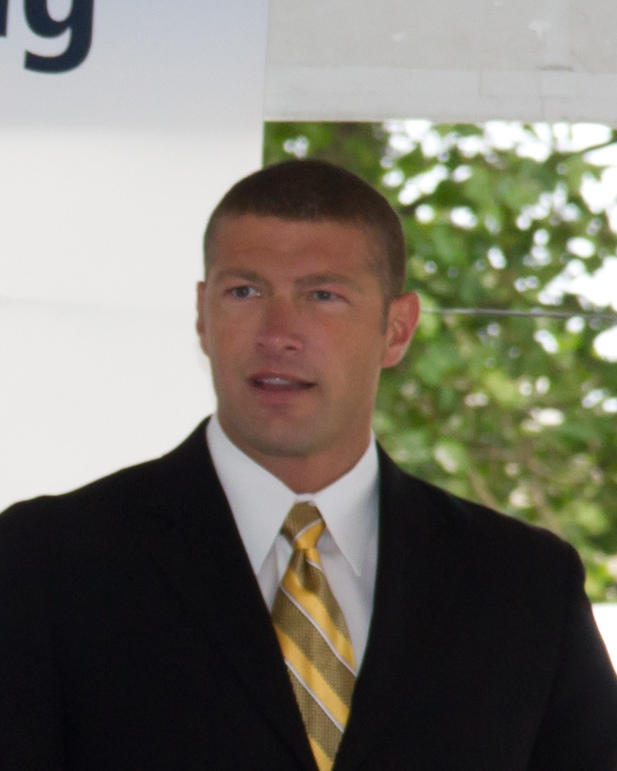

Nominee	Aaron Reardon	Jack Turk
Party	Democratic	Republican
Popular vote	104,008	55,419
Percentage	65.02%	34.65%
County Executive before election
Aaron Reardon
Democratic
Elected County Executive
Aaron Reardon
Democratic

The 2007 Snohomish County Executive election took place on November 6, 2007, to elect the county executive of Snohomish County, Washington.

In 2004, Washington adopted a top-two primary system for most elections in the state, but the new primary law was struck down by the U.S. Court of Appeals for the Ninth Circuit. The 2007 election took place during the state's appeal to the U.S. Supreme Court, which would ultimately result in a ruling upholding the primary system. As a result, separate party primaries were used in the 2007 election.

Incumbent Democratic County Executive Aaron Reardon ran for re-election to a second term. Though Reardon was originally set to face Republican County Sheriff Rick Bart in his bid for re-election, Bart dropped out of the race on March 20, 2007, leaving Republicans without a backup candidate. Entertainer Jack Turk ultimately ran for the nomination and won the Republican primary unopposed.

Reardon defeated Turk in a landslide to win his second term, receiving 65 percent of the vote to Turk's 35 percent.

== Democratic primary ==
=== Candidates ===
- Aaron Reardon, incumbent County Executive

=== Results ===
Democratic primary results
Party	Candidate	Votes	%
Democratic	Aaron Reardon (inc.)	49,700	98.77%
Democratic	Write-ins	617	1.23%
Total votes		50,317	100.00%

== Republican primary ==
=== Candidates ===
- Jack Turk, entertainer and former Microsoft manager

==== Dropped out ====
- Rick Bart, County Sheriff

==== Declined ====
- John Koster, County Councilman, former State Representative

=== Results ===
Republican primary results
Party	Candidate	Votes	%
Republican	Jack Turk	32,154	99.22%
Republican	Write-ins	252	0.78%
Total votes		32,406	100.00%

== General election ==
=== Results ===
2007 Snohomish County Executive election
Party	Candidate	Votes	%
Democratic	Aaron Reardon (inc.)	104,008	65.02%
Republican	Jack Turk	55,419	34.65%
Write-in		533	0.33%
Total votes		159,960	100.00%
Democratic hold			
