= Sam Low =

American businessman and politician

Member of the Washington House of Representatives from the 39th district
- Incumbent
- Assumed office January 9, 2023 Serving with Carolyn Eslick
- Preceded by: Robert Sutherland

Member of the Snohomish County Council from the 5th district
- Incumbent
- Assumed office November 29, 2016
- Preceded by: Hans Dunshee

Personal details
- Born: 1970 (age 55–56) Everett, Washington, U.S.
- Party: Republican
- Education: Maranatha Baptist University (Master of Organizational Leadership); Pacific Coast Baptist Bible College (BA)
- Profession: Small business owner
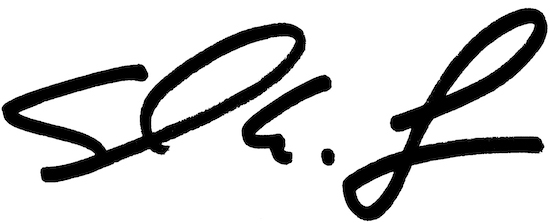
- Signature

Samuel E. Low (born 1970) is an American businessman and member of the Washington State House of Representatives, representing the 39th district.

== Early life and career ==
After graduation from Maranatha Baptist University with a degree in theology, Low operated a painting business in Lake Stevens for 10 years.

== Political career ==
Low was elected to represent District 5 on the Snohomish County Council in 2016. Prior to his election to the Snohomish County Council, he was a member of the Lake Stevens city council and had served as Council President and Mayor Pro Tem.

Low was initially elected to complete the term of Dave Somers, who had been elected as County Executive, by defeating appointed councilman and former state representative Hans Dunshee. He was elected to a full term of his own in November 2017. As a councilmember, Low served as chair of Washington state's Transportation Improvement Board.

Low was elected to the Washington House of Representatives on November 8, 2022, to represent the 39th district.

== Censureship ==
On February 27, 2024, the Skagit County Republican Party Central Committee voted unanimously to formally Censure 39th legislative district State Representatives Sam Low and Carolyn Eslick for their sponsorship and voting for SHB 2368. A then proposed law by the Washington State Legislature that authorized the Washington State Department of Social and Health Services to coordinate statewide efforts to assist immigrants and refugees with appropriated tax-payer funds and services. Skagit County Republicans believed that the funds appropriated for SHB 2368 would increase pressure on housing, healthcare, schools and that the presence of immigrants would increase the potential for violence, crime, and deadly drug distribution, including Fentanyl, contributing to the degradation of Washington State. Additionally, the Skagit County Republican Party cited the conflict that SHB 2368 had with Republican and Conservative principles, and the Skagit County Republican Party platform.

== Personal life ==
Low lives in Lake Stevens with his wife Mariah.

== Electoral history ==
=== 2013 ===
2013 Lake Stevens City Council, Position 2 General Election results
Party	Candidate	Votes	%
Nonpartisan	Sam Low	4,187	97.67
Write-in		100	2.33
Total votes		4,287	100.00%

=== 2016 ===
2016 Snohomish County Council, District 5 General Election results
Party	Candidate	Votes	%
Republican	Sam Low	36,933	52.38
Democratic	Hans Dunshee (incumbent)	33,494	47.50
Write-in		88	0.12
Total votes		70,515	100.00%
Republican gain from Democratic			

=== 2017 ===
2017 Snohomish County Council, District 5 General Election results
Party	Candidate	Votes	%
Republican	Sam Low (incumbent)	18,079	57.51
Democratic	Kristin Kelly	13,254	42.16
Write-in		103	0.33
Total votes		31,436	100.00%
Republican hold			

=== 2021 ===
2021 Snohomish County Council, District 5 General Election results
Party	Candidate	Votes	%
Republican	Sam Low (incumbent)	25,381	60.59
Democratic	Brandy Donaghy	16,474	39.33
Write-in		33	0.08
Total votes		41,888	100.00%
Republican hold			

=== 2022 ===
2022 Washington State House of Representatives, District 39 Primary Election results
Party	Candidate	Votes	%
Republican	Robert Sutherland (incumbent)	8,964	31.84
Republican	Sam Low	8,241	29.27
Democratic	Claus Joens	6,254	22.21
Democratic	Karl de Jong	4,653	16.53
Write-in		41	0.15
Total votes		28,153	100.00%

2022 Washington State House of Representatives, District 39 General Election results
Party	Candidate	Votes	%
Republican	Sam Low	24,838	56.27
Republican	Robert Sutherland (incumbent)	17,819	40.37
Write-in		1,484	3.36
Total votes		44,141	100.00%
Republican hold			
