= Robert Sutherland (Washington politician) =

American politician from Washington

Robert J. Sutherland

Member of the Washington House of Representatives from the 39th district
- In office January 14, 2019 – January 8, 2023 Serving with Carolyn Eslick
- Preceded by: Dan Kristiansen
- Succeeded by: Sam Low

Personal details
- Born: 1958 or 1959 (age 67–68) Burbank, California
- Party: Republican
- Education: Gonzaga University
- Occupation: Politician
- Website: Legislative website

Robert J. Sutherland (born October 19, 1959) is a former American politician previously serving as a Republican member of the Washington House of Representatives for the 39th district.

== Background ==
Sutherland was born and raised in Burbank, California. After graduating from high school, Sutherland served in the United States Air Force. Sutherland then earned a Bachelor of Science degree in biochemistry from Gonzaga University.

== Career ==
Prior to entering politics, Sutherland worked as a biochemist, specializing in the development of cancer therapies.

Sutherland sought election to the Washington's 1st congressional district in the United States House of Representatives in 2014 and 2016. He lost both elections to incumbent Congresswoman Suzan DelBene.

After the retirement of Representative Dan Kristiansen, Sutherland sought election to Washington's House of Representatives. In 2018, he defeated Democrat Ivan Lewis 56%-44%. Sutherland won re-election in 2020 over Democrat Claus Joens 60%-40%.

=== Reaction to 2020 presidential election ===
Shortly after Joe Biden defeated Donald Trump in the 2020 presidential election, Sutherland falsely claimed that Democrats "cheated" and that the election was not "fair". Since the 2020 elections, Sutherland has promoted false claims of widespread election fraud and conspiracy theories. In the aftermath of the 2020 presidential election, Sutherland told his followers on Facebook to "Prepare for war" after proclaiming that "Joe Biden is not now, nor will ever be my President". He also said it would be "righteous" if Donald Trump utilized the military to forcefully stay in power.

In June 2021, Sutherland visited Phoenix, Arizona to tour the controversial Arizona audit. Afterwards, Sutherland expressed support for the audit and suggested a similar audit take place in Washington state. He also claimed there were potential errors on tens of thousands of ballots cast in the 2020 Washington election. Sutherland was criticized by Secretary of State Kim Wyman for his understanding of state and national elections, saying that there are already safeguards to prevent fraud, that there's no proof of widespread fraud in the state or national elections, and that the Arizona audit has no standards for a forensic audit of elections, and that Cyber Ninjas, the company conducting the work in audit, has no prior experience with audits.

In early August 2021, Sutherland visited South Dakota to attend a symposium organized by MyPillow CEO Mike Lindell, known for promoting false claims of fraud about the 2020 presidential election. He was one of three Washington legislators to attend the event using reimbursed funds from the state legislature's annual travel allotment for events "connected to their legislative work".

On August 15, Sutherland and four other Washington Republican lawmakers held an unofficial hearing with the aim of having people testify about alleged voting irregularities and possibly calling for a "forensic audit" to take place in Washington State similar to the criticized Arizona audit. Sutherland admitted that since Republicans are a minority in the state legislature, they can't force an audit but stated "The people themselves must rise up after hearing the evidence and the data." However, these efforts have not won any support from top Republicans in the state. Sutherland later emailed attendees to encourage them to participate in a September lawsuit that alleged that auditors in Whatcom, Snohomish, and Clark counties manipulated ballots, among other allegations surrounding the elections. The lawsuit sought to establish a forensic audit for the state's 2020 elections.

=== 2022 ===
The 2020 census redistricting process substantially altered the 39th legislative district, most notably shifting the city of Lake Stevens into the district. Sutherland received a primary challenge from Republican Snohomish County Councilmember Sam Low of Lake Stevens in addition to two Democratic opponents. In the primary election, Sutherland narrowly finished ahead of Low, 32%-29%, to secure an all-Republican general election matchup. Low received support from The Seattle Times, The Everett Herald, and most labor unions and mayors in the district. In the November general election, Low defeated Sutherland 56%-40%. Low won the vast majority of precincts added to the district by redistricting and in Lake Stevens while Sutherland won most precincts in the part of the district retained from 2020.

=== 2023 ===
Following his 2022 defeat, Sutherland ran for Snohomish County Auditor in 2023 against incumbent Garth Fell and 2019 runner-up Cindy Gobel. In the primary, Sutherland finished third with 27% of the vote, compared to Fell's 40% and Gobel's 33%, and did not advance to the general election.

== Personal life ==
Sutherland and his wife, Donna, have four children. They live in Granite Falls, Washington.
