= 2000 United States House of Representatives elections in Washington =

- November 7, 2000

All 9 Washington seats to the United States House of Representatives
	Majority party	Minority party
Party	Democratic	Republican
Last election	5	4
Seats won	6	3
Seat change	▲1	▼1
Popular vote	1,245,872	997,877
Percentage	55.52%	44.47%

Democratic
50–60%
60–70%
70–80%
Republican
40–50%
50–60%
60–70%
70–80%

The 2000 House elections in Washington occurred on November 7, 2000, to elect the members of the State of Washington's delegation to the United States House of Representatives. Washington has nine seats in the House, apportioned according to the 1990 United States census. This election saw the Democrats flip one Republican-held open seat. These elections occurred alongside Al Gore's victory in the state over George W. Bush in the presidential election.

== Overview ==
United States House of Representatives elections in Washington, 2000
Party	Votes	Percentage	Seats	+/–
Democratic	1,245,872	52.3%	6	—
Republican	997,877	41.9%	3	—
Libertarian	82,289	3.5%	0	—
Green	52,142	2.1%	0	—
Natural Law	4,231	0.2%	0	—
Totals	2,378,180	100.00%	9	—

== District 1 ==
2000 Washington's 1st congressional district election
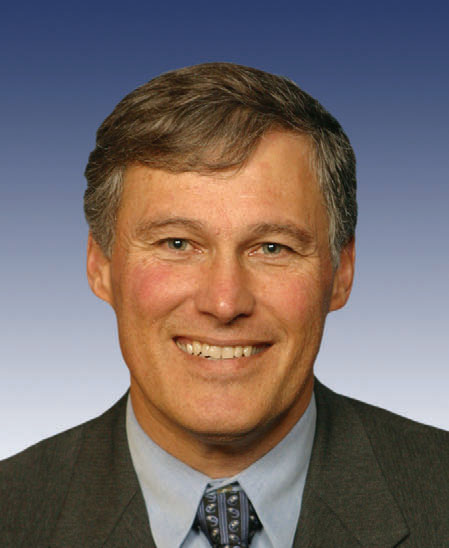

Nominee	Jay Inslee	Dan McDonald
Party	Democratic	Republican
Popular vote	155,820	121,823
Percentage	54.5%	42.6%
- County results Inslee: 50–60%
U.S. Representative before election
Jay Inslee
Democratic
Elected U.S. Representative
Jay Inslee
Democratic

Incumbent Democratic Congressman Jay Inslee ran for a fourth non-consecutive term in Congress from this fairly liberal district rooted in portions of the Kitsap Peninsula and Seattle’s northern suburbs. Inslee faced Republican candidate, State Senator Dan McDonald, winning re-election by a wide margin.

=== General election ===
==== Polling ====
Poll source	Date(s)	Sample size	Margin of error	Jay Inslee (D)	Dan McDonald (R)	Other / undecided (Note: Calculated by taking the difference of 100% and all other candidates combined.)
SurveyUSA	October 21, 2000	500	—	52%	45%	3%

==== Results ====
2000 Washington's 1st congressional district election
Party	Candidate	Votes	%
Democratic	Jay Inslee (inc.)	155,820	54.55
Republican	Dan McDonald	121,823	42.65
Libertarian	Bruce Newman	7,993	2.80
Total votes		285,636	100.00
Democratic hold			

===== By county =====
County results
County	Jay Inslee Democratic		Dan McDonald Republican		Bruce Newman Libertarian		Margin		Total votes
County	#	%	#	%	#	%	#	%	Total votes
King (part)	73,482	55.51%	55,332	41.80%	3,557	2.69%	18,150	13.71%	132,371
Kitsap (part)	27,099	53.91%	21,786	43.34%	1,378	2.74%	5,313	10.57%	50,263
Snohomish (part)	55,239	53.63%	44,705	43.40%	3,058	2.97%	10,534	10.23%	103,002
Totals	155,820	54.55%	121,823	42.65%	7,993	2.80%	33,997	11.90%	285,636

== District 2 ==
2000 Washington's 2nd congressional district election

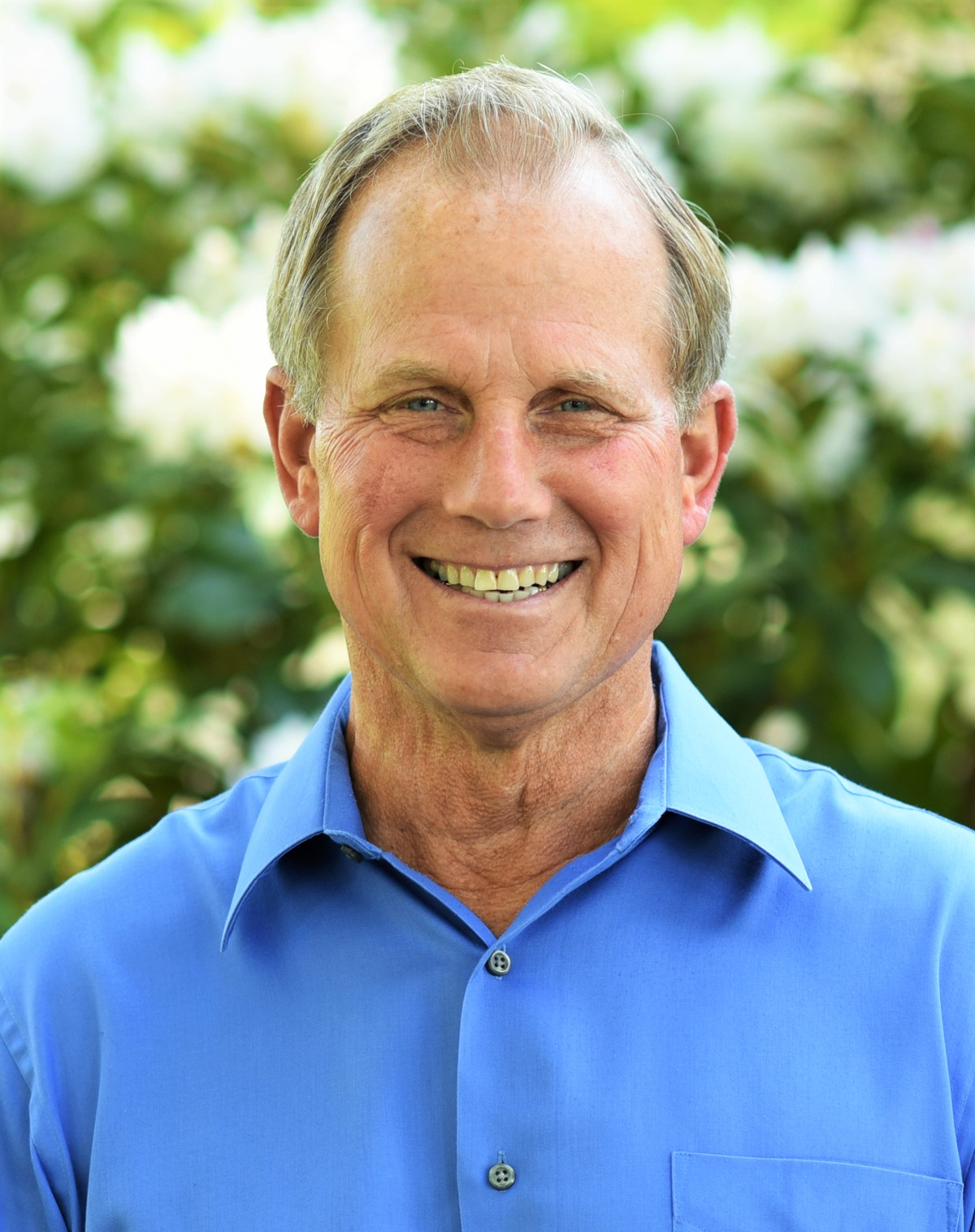
Nominee	Rick Larsen	John Koster
Party	Democratic	Republican
Popular vote	146,617	134,660
Percentage	50.0%	45.9%
- County results Larsen: 50–60% Koster: 40–50%
U.S. Representative before election
Jack Metcalf
Republican
Elected U.S. Representative
Rick Larsen
Democratic

Incumbent Republican Congressman Jack Metcalf retired instead of seeking a fourth term. The open seat pitted Republican state legislator John Koster against Democrat Rick Larsen, a member of the Snohomish County Council. Larsen won the election flipping the seat from Republican to Democratic, although by a very slim majority of the vote.

=== General election ===
==== Polling ====
Poll source	Date(s)	Sample size	Margin of error	John Koster (R)	Rick Larsen (D)	Other / undecided (Note: Calculated by taking the difference of 100% and all other candidates combined.)
SurveyUSA	October 21, 2000	500	—	44%	50%	6%
Moore Information Group (R) (Note: Poll conducted for John Koster.)	October 17, 2000	300 (RV)	—	41%	37%	22%

==== Results ====
2000 Washington's 2nd congressional district election
Party	Candidate	Votes	%
Democratic	Rick Larsen	146,617	50.01
Republican	John Koster	134,660	45.93
Libertarian	Stuart Andrews	7,672	2.62
Natural Law	Glen S. Johnson	4,231	1.44
Total votes		293,180	100.00
Democratic gain from Republican			

==== By county ====
County	John Koster Republican		Rick Larsen Democratic		Various candidates Other parties		Margin		Total votes cast
County	#	%	#	%	#	%	#	%	Total votes cast
Island	15,426	48.94%	14,941	47.40%	1,153	3.66%	-485	-1.54%	31,520
San Juan	2,910	36.49%	4,488	56.28%	577	7.24%	1,578	19.79%	7,975
Skagit	20,864	47.85%	20,788	47.68%	1,950	4.47%	-76	-0.17%	43,602
Snohomish (part)	63,879	45.57%	71,166	50.76%	5,143	3.67%	7,287	5.20%	140,188
Whatcom	31,581	45.18%	35,234	50.41%	3,080	4.41%	3,653	5.23%	69,895
Totals	134,660	45.93%	146,617	50.01%	11,903	4.06%	11,957	4.08%	293,180

== District 3 ==
2000 Washington's 3rd congressional district election
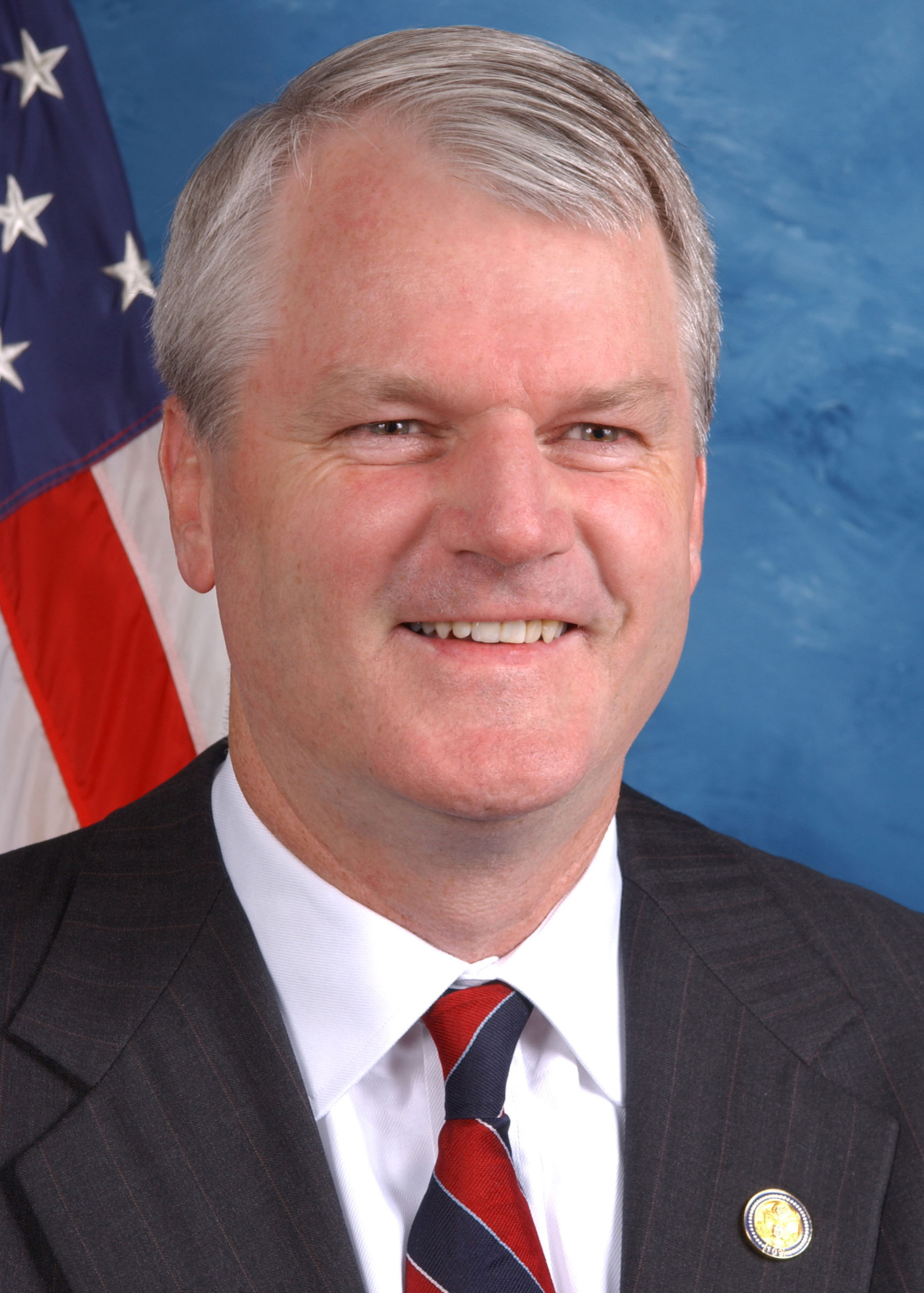

Nominee	Brian Baird	Trent R. Matson
Party	Democratic	Republican
Popular vote	159,428	114,861
Percentage	56.4%	40.6%
- County results Baird: 50–60% 60–70% Matson: 50–60%
U.S. Representative before election
Brian Baird
Democratic
Elected U.S. Representative
Brian Baird
Democratic

Though the Southwest Washington-based district that two-term Democratic incumbent Congressman Brian Baird represented was essentially a centrist district, he was able to beat challenger Trent R. Matson by a wide margin.

=== Results ===
2000 Washington's 3rd congressional district election
Party	Candidate	Votes	%
Democratic	Brian Baird (inc.)	159,428	56.40
Republican	Trent R. Matson	114,861	40.64
Libertarian	Erne Lewis	8,375	2.96
Total votes		282,664	100.00
Democratic hold			

==== By county ====
County results
County	Brian Baird Democratic		Trent R. Matson Republican		Erne Lewis Libertarian		Margin		Total votes
County	#	%	#	%	#	%	#	%	Total votes
Clark	72,495	55.24%	55,064	41.96%	3,685	2.81%	17,431	13.28%	131,244
Cowlitz	21,523	59.40%	13,850	38.23%	859	2.37%	7,673	21.18%	36,232
Grays Harbor (part)	4,175	62.79%	2,242	33.72%	232	3.49%	1,933	29.07%	6,649
Klickitat (part)	2,023	56.13%	1,474	40.90%	107	2.97%	549	15.23%	3,604
Lewis	12,715	43.83%	15,372	52.99%	924	3.18%	-2,657	-9.16%	29,011
Pacific	6,080	66.02%	2,871	31.18%	258	2.80%	3,209	34.85%	9,209
Skamania	2,218	54.11%	1,656	40.40%	225	5.49%	562	13.71%	4,099
Thurston (part)	37,014	60.97%	21,654	35.67%	2,044	3.37%	15,360	25.30%	60,712
Wahkiakum	1,185	62.24%	678	35.61%	41	2.15%	507	26.63%	1,904
Totals	159,428	56.40%	114,861	40.64%	8,375	2.96%	44,567	15.77%	282,664

== District 4 ==
2000 Washington's 4th congressional district election
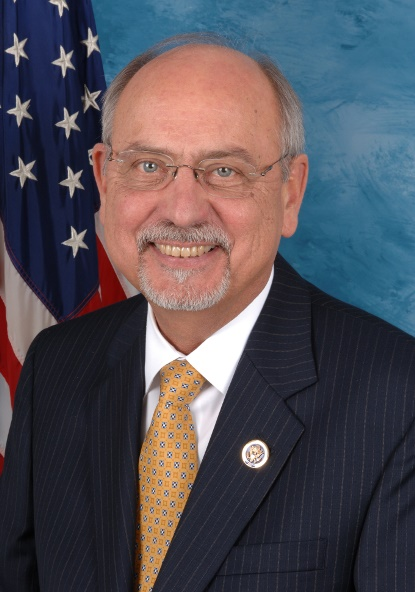

Nominee	Doc Hastings	Jim Davis
Party	Republican	Democratic
Popular vote	143,259	87,585
Percentage	60.9%	37.3%
- County results Hastings: 50–60% 60–70% 70–80%
U.S. Representative before election
Doc Hastings
Republican
Elected U.S. Representative
Doc Hastings
Republican

In the solidly conservative, central Washington congressional district, incumbent Republican Congressman Doc Hastings faced Democrat Jim Davis. Owing to Hastings’s popularity and his district’s strong proclivity towards electing Republican candidates, he was yet again re-elected in a landslide.

=== Results ===
2000 Washington's 4th congressional district election
Party	Candidate	Votes	%
Republican	Doc Hastings (inc.)	143,259	60.93
Democratic	Jim Davis	87,585	37.25
Libertarian	Fred D. Krauss	4,260	1.81
Total votes		235,104	100.00
Republican hold			

==== By county ====
County results
County	Doc Hastings Republican		Jim Davis Democratic		Fred D. Krauss Libertarian		Margin		Total votes
County	#	%	#	%	#	%	#	%	Total votes
Adams (part)	88	74.58%	27	22.88%	3	2.54%	61	51.69%	118
Benton	37,140	63.06%	20,825	35.36%	934	1.59%	16,315	27.70%	58,899
Chelan	16,851	65.74%	8,361	32.62%	421	1.64%	8,490	33.12%	25,633
Douglas	8,039	63.97%	4,273	34.00%	254	2.02%	3,766	29.97%	12,566
Franklin	8,565	62.12%	5,032	36.50%	190	1.38%	3,533	25.63%	13,787
Grant	15,313	65.91%	7,461	32.12%	458	1.97%	7,852	33.80%	23,232
Kittitas	7,591	55.33%	5,803	42.30%	326	2.38%	1,788	13.03%	13,720
Klickitat (part)	2,647	62.43%	1,477	34.83%	116	2.74%	1,170	27.59%	4,240
Okanogan	9,322	64.73%	4,665	32.39%	414	2.87%	4,657	32.34%	14,401
Yakima	37,703	55.03%	29,661	43.30%	1,144	1.67%	8,042	11.74%	68,508
Totals	143,259	60.93%	87,585	37.25%	4,260	1.81%	55,674	23.68%	235,104

== District 5 ==
2000 Washington's 5th congressional district election
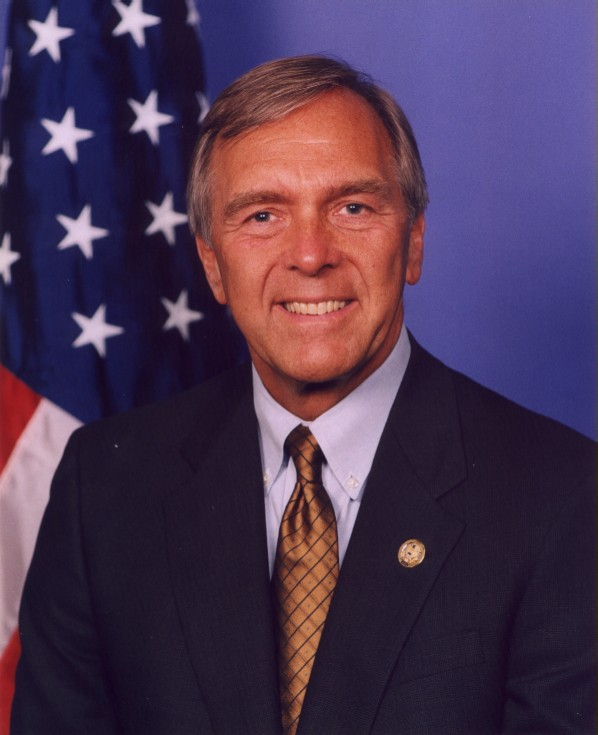

Nominee	George R. Nethercutt	Tom Keefe
Party	Republican	Democratic
Popular vote	144,038	97,703
Percentage	57.3%	38.9%
- County results Nethercutt: 50–60% 60–70% 70–80%
U.S. Representative before election
George R. Nethercutt
Republican
Elected U.S. Representative
George R. Nethercutt
Republican

Incumbent Republican Congressman George Nethercutt won a fourth term in Congress with Democratic candidate Tom Keefe and Libertarian candidate Greg Holmes also standing.

=== General election ===
==== Polling ====
Poll source	Date(s)	Sample size	Margin of error	George Nethercutt (R)	Tom Keefe (D)	Other / undecided (Note: Calculated by taking the difference of 100% and all other candidates combined.)
Research 2000	October 24, 2000	404	—	48%	39%	13%

==== Results ====
2000 Washington's 5th congressional district election
Party	Candidate	Votes	%
Republican	George R. Nethercutt (inc.)	144,038	57.34
Democratic	Tom Keefe	97,703	38.89
Libertarian	Greg Holmes	9,473	3.77
Total votes		251,214	100.00
Republican hold			

===== By county =====
County results
County	George Nethercutt Republican		Tom Keefe Democratic		Greg Holmes Libertarian		Margin		Total votes
County	#	%	#	%	#	%	#	%	Total votes
Adams (part)	3,424	71.74%	1,209	25.33%	140	2.93%	2,215	46.41%	4,773
Asotin	4,804	61.37%	2,786	35.59%	238	3.04%	2,018	25.78%	7,828
Columbia	1,477	70.91%	539	25.88%	67	3.22%	938	45.03%	2,083
Ferry	1,785	59.68%	1,045	34.94%	161	5.38%	740	24.74%	2,991
Garfield	970	74.16%	303	23.17%	35	2.68%	667	50.99%	1,308
Lincoln	3,562	69.50%	1,392	27.16%	171	3.34%	2,170	42.34%	5,125
Pend Oreille	2,938	55.05%	2,089	39.14%	310	5.81%	849	15.91%	5,337
Spokane	92,811	55.09%	69,377	41.18%	6,275	3.72%	23,434	13.91%	168,463
Stevens	10,673	64.21%	5,105	30.71%	845	5.08%	5,568	33.50%	16,623
Walla Walla	12,094	58.15%	7,963	38.29%	740	3.56%	4,131	19.86%	20,797
Whitman	9,500	59.80%	5,895	37.11%	491	3.09%	3,605	22.69%	15,886
Totals	144,038	57.34%	97,703	38.89%	9,473	3.77%	46,335	18.44%	251,214

== District 6 ==
2000 Washington's 6th congressional district election
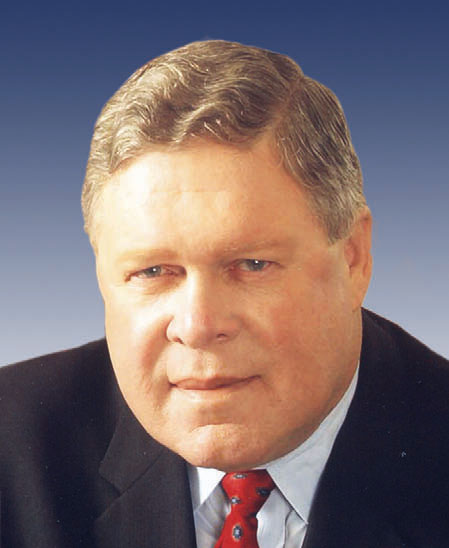

Nominee	Norm Dicks	Bob Lawrence
Party	Democratic	Republican
Popular vote	164,853	79,215
Percentage	64.7%	31.1%
- County results Dicks: 50–60% 60–70%
U.S. Representative before election
Norm Dicks
Democratic
Elected U.S. Representative
Norm Dicks
Democratic

Long-serving Democratic Congressman Norm Dicks, the longest-serving of Washington congressmen, has represented this liberal-leaning, Kitsap Peninsula-based district since he was first elected in 1976. Congressman Dicks faced Air Force veteran and Republican nominee Bob Lawrence in the general election. Lawrence was defeated in a landslide margin by Dicks.

=== Results ===
Washington's 6th congressional district election, 2002
Party	Candidate	Votes	%
Democratic	Norm Dicks (inc.)	164,853	64.72
Republican	Bob Lawrence	79,215	31.10
Libertarian	John Bennett	10,645	4.18
Total votes		254,713	100.00
Democratic hold			

==== By county ====
County results
County	Norm Dicks Democratic		Bob Lawrence Republican		John Bennett Libertarian		Margin		Total votes
County	#	%	#	%	#	%	#	%	Total votes
Clallam	16,225	52.40%	12,226	39.49%	2,512	8.11%	3,999	12.92%	30,963
Grays Harbor (part)	12,871	69.71%	4,822	26.12%	770	4.17%	8,049	43.60%	18,463
Jefferson	10,040	65.14%	4,650	30.17%	724	4.70%	5,390	34.97%	15,414
Kitsap (part)	33,826	66.88%	14,959	29.58%	1,791	3.54%	18,867	37.30%	50,576
Mason	13,515	62.32%	7,091	32.70%	1,079	4.98%	6,424	29.62%	21,685
Pierce (part)	78,376	66.64%	35,467	30.16%	3,769	3.20%	42,909	36.48%	117,612
Totals	164,853	64.72%	79,215	31.10%	10,645	4.18%	85,638	33.62%	254,713

== District 7 ==
2000 Washington's 7th congressional district election
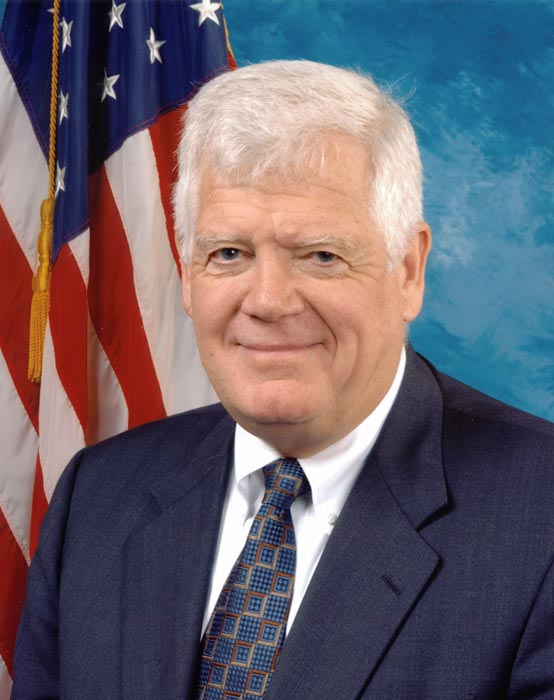

Nominee	Jim McDermott	Joe Szwaja	Joel Grus
Party	Democratic	Green	Libertarian
Popular vote	193,470	52,142	20,197
Percentage	72.8%	19.6%	7.6%
- County results McDermott: 70–80%
U.S. Representative before election
Jim McDermott
Democratic
Elected U.S. Representative
Jim McDermott
Democratic

This district, the most liberal in Washington, encompasses most of the city of Seattle and has been represented by Democratic Congressman Jim McDermott since he was first elected in 1988. Running for a seventh term, McDermott was challenged by Green Party candidate Joe Szwaja and Libertarian Joel Grus, the Republicans did not field a candidate in this race. McDermott easily won re-election defeating both the Green and Libertarian candidates by a landslide margin.

Washington's 7th congressional district election, 2002
Party	Candidate	Votes	%
Democratic	Jim McDermott (inc.)	193,470	72.79
Green	Joe Szwaja	52,142	19.62
Libertarian	Joel Grus	20,197	7.60
Total votes		265,809	100.00
Democratic hold			

=== By county ===
County results
County	Jim McDermott Democratic		Joe Swaja Green		Joel Grus Libertarian		Margin		Total votes
County	#	%	#	%	#	%	#	%	Total votes
King (part)	193,470	72.79%	52,142	19.62%	20,197	7.60%	141,328	53.17%	265,809
Totals	193,470	72.79%	52,142	19.62%	20,197	7.60%	141,328	53.17%	265,809

== District 8 ==
2000 Washington's 8th congressional district election
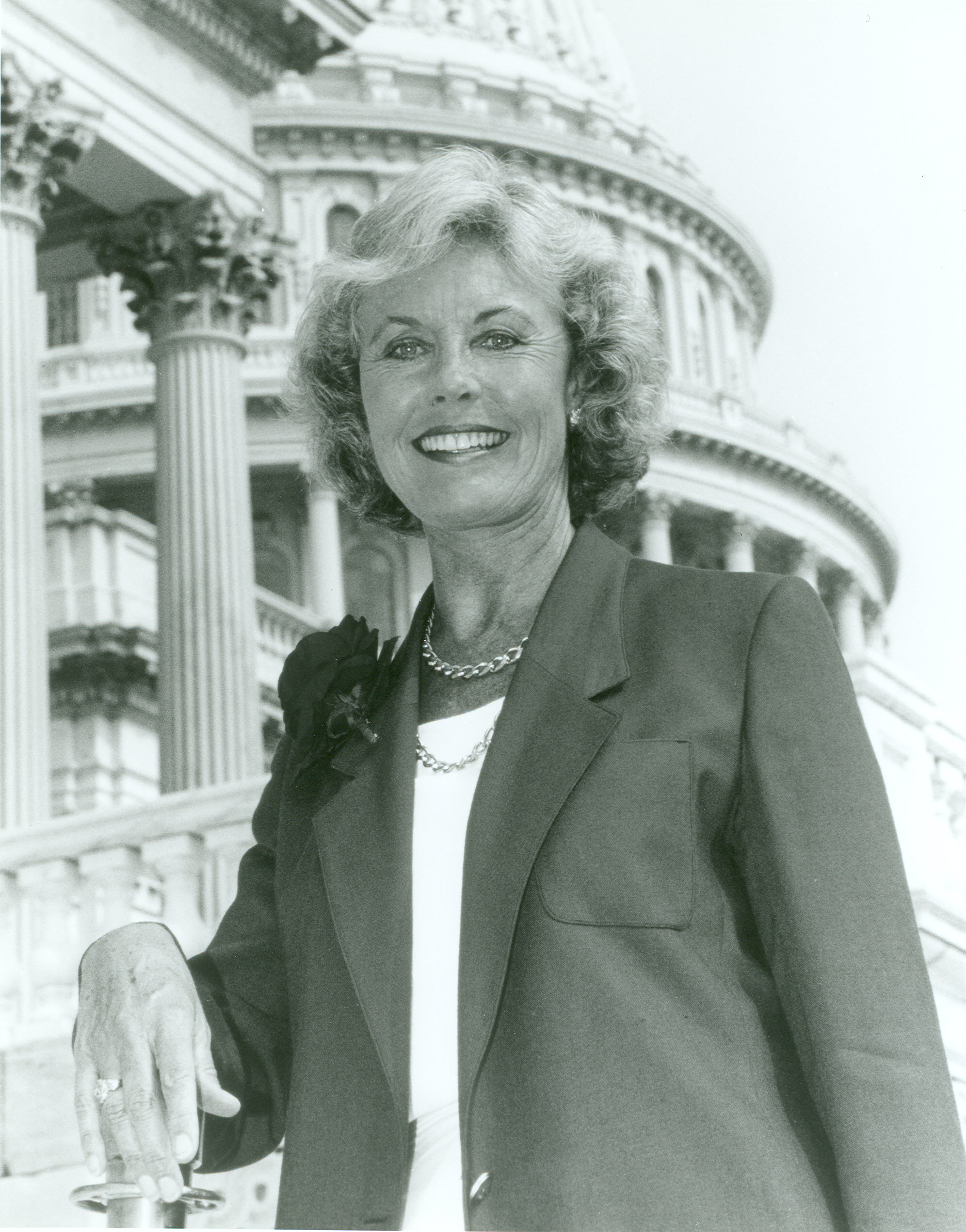

Nominee	Jennifer Dunn	Heidi Behrens-Benedict
Party	Republican	Democratic
Popular vote	183,255	104,944
Percentage	62.2%	35.6%
- County results Dunn: 60–70%
U.S. Representative before election
Jennifer Dunn
Republican
Elected U.S. Representative
Jennifer Dunn
Republican

Incumbent Republican Congresswoman Jennifer Dunn ran for a fifth term in this liberal-leaning district and faced Democratic nominee Heidi Behrens-Benedict and Libertarian Bernard McIlroy in the general election. The general election was a rematch between Dunn and Behrens-Benedict. Despite the 8th district, based in the eastern Seattle suburbs, having voted for Al Gore by a slim margin, Dunn won a fifth term by a wide margin.

=== General election ===
==== Polling ====
Poll source	Date(s)	Sample size	Margin of error	Jennifer Dunn (R)	Heidi Behrens-Benedict (D)	Other / undecided (Note: Calculated by taking the difference of 100% and all other candidates combined.)
SurveyUSA	October 21, 2000	500	—	58%	40%	2%

==== Results ====
Washington's 8th congressional district election, 2000
Party	Candidate	Votes	%
Republican	Jennifer Dunn (inc.)	183,255	62.23
Democratic	Heidi Behrens-Benedict	104,944	35.64
Libertarian	Bernard McIlroy	6,269	2.13
Total votes		294,468	100.00
Republican hold			

===== By county =====
County results
County	Jennifer Dunn Republican		Heidi Behrens-Benedict Democratic		Bernard McIlroy Libertarian		Margin		Total votes
County	#	%	#	%	#	%	#	%	Total votes
King (part)	146,955	62.00%	85,159	35.93%	4,919	2.08%	61,796	26.07%	237,033
Pierce (part)	36,300	63.20%	19,785	34.45%	1,350	2.35%	16,515	28.75%	57,435
Totals	183,255	62.23%	104,944	35.64%	6,269	2.13%	78,311	26.59%	294,468

== District 9 ==
2000 Washington's 9th congressional district election
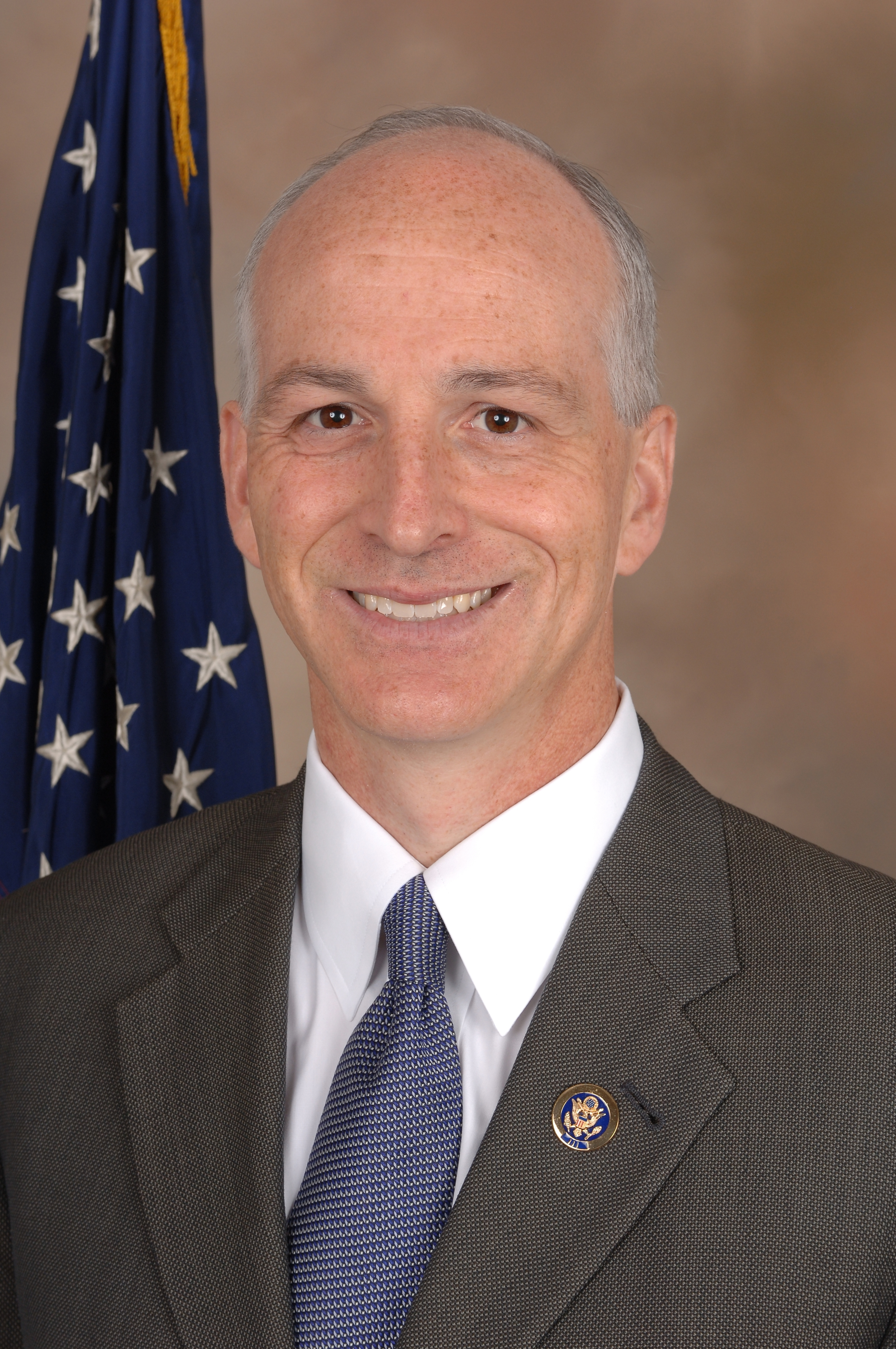

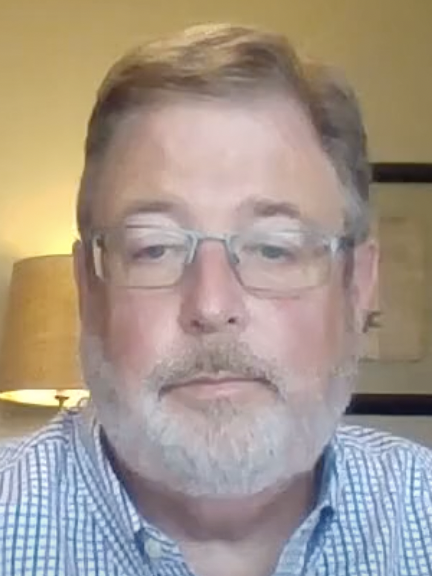
Nominee	Adam Smith	Chris Vance
Party	Democratic	Republican
Popular vote	135,452	76,766
Percentage	61.7%	35.0%
- County results Smith: 50–60% 60–70%
U.S. Representative before election
Adam Smith
Democratic
Elected U.S. Representative
Adam Smith
Democratic

Running for a third term, incumbent Democratic Congressman Adam Smith was opposed by Republican, King County Councilmember Chris Vance and Libertarian candidate Jonathan V. Wright in the general election. Congressman Smith represents a liberal-leaning district that runs from the state’s capital of Olympia to some of the southern suburbs of Seattle, Smith won by a wide margin.

=== Results ===
Washington's 9th congressional district election, 2000
Party	Candidate	Votes	%
Democratic	Adam Smith (inc.)	135,452	61.67
Republican	Chris Vance	76,766	34.95
Libertarian	Jonathan V. Wright	7,405	3.37
Total votes		219,623	100.00
Democratic hold			

==== By county ====
County results
County	Adam Smith Democratic		Chris Vance Republican		Jonathan V. Wright Libertarian		Margin		Total votes
County	#	%	#	%	#	%	#	%	Total votes
King (part)	66,872	63.63%	34,617	32.94%	3,609	3.43%	32,255	30.69%	105,098
Pierce (part)	49,775	60.13%	30,439	36.77%	2,566	3.10%	19,336	23.36%	82,780
Thurston (part)	18,805	59.24%	11,710	36.89%	1,230	3.87%	7,095	22.35%	31,745
Totals	135,452	61.67%	76,766	34.95%	7,405	3.37%	58,686	26.72%	219,623
