= 1980 Snohomish County Executive special election =

- November 5, 1980

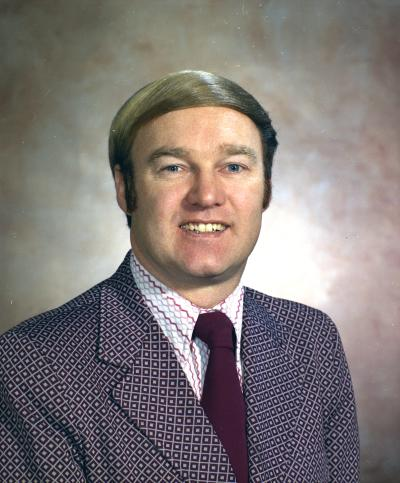

| Nominee | Willis Tucker | Gary A. Nelson | Louise Saluteen |
| Party | Democratic | Republican | Independent |
| Popular vote | 13,085 | 11,852 | 1,910 |
| Percentage | 48.74% | 44.15% | 7.11% |
County Executive before election
Position established
Elected County Executive
Willis Tucker
Democratic

The 1980 Snohomish County Executive special election took place on March 11, 1980, following a primary election on February 5, 1980, to elect the first county executive of Snohomish County, Washington. On November 6, 1979, voters approved a home rule charter that created an elected County Executive and a five-member County Council, abolishing the three-member County Commission as of May 1, 1980.

Four candidates ran in the election: former newspaper editor Willis Tucker, a Democrat; Republican State Representative Gary A. Nelson, perennial candidate John Patric, a Republican; and housewife Louise Saluteen, an independent. In the primary election, Tucker placed first with 47 percent, and Nelson won the Republican nomination over Patric in a landslide, winning 41 percent of the vote to Patric's 4 percent, while Saluteen won 8 percent of the vote.

Tucker ultimately won the general election by a narrow margin, receiving 49 percent of the vote to Nelson's 44 percent and Saluteen's 7 percent, though Republicans won a majority on the County Council.

== Primary election ==
=== Candidates ===
- Willis Tucker, former editor of the Everett Herald Western Sun edition (Democratic)
- Gary A. Nelson, State Representative (Republican)
- Louise Saluteen, housewife (independent)
- John Patric, perennial candidate (Republican)

=== Results ===
Blanket primary results
| Party | Candidate | Votes | % |
|---|---|---|---|
| Democratic | Willis Tucker | 10,880 | 46.51% |
| Republican | Gary A. Nelson | 9,702 | 41.47% |
| Independent | Louise Saluteen | 1,763 | 7.54% |
| Republican | John Patric | 1,050 | 4.49% |
| Total votes | | 23,395 | 100.00% |

== General election ==
=== Results ===
1980 Snohomish County Executive special election
| Party | Candidate | Votes | % |
|---|---|---|---|
| Democratic | Willis Tucker | 13,085 | 48.74% |
| Republican | Gary A. Nelson | 11,852 | 44.15% |
| Independent | Louise Saluteen | 1,910 | 7.11% |
| Total votes | | 26,847 | 100.00% |
| Democratic win (new seat) | | | |
