= Senator Costa =

Senator Costa may refer to:

- Catherine A. Costa (1926–2025), New Jersey State Senate
- Jay Costa (born 1957), Pennsylvania State Senate
- Jeralita Costa (born 1959), Washington State Senate
- Jim Costa (born 1952), California State Senate

== See also ==
- William P. Costas (1927–2013), Indiana State Senate
