= Valerie Stevens =

Valerie Stevens may refer to:

- Valerie Stevens, candidate in Manchester Council election, 1982
- Valerie Stevens, character in V (2009 TV series)
- Val Stevens, Washington politician
