= 1991 Snohomish County Executive election =

- November 5, 1991

Nominee	Bob Drewel	Cliff Bailey
Party	Democratic	Republican
Popular vote	69,435	61,759
Percentage	52.93%	47.07%
County Executive before election
Willis Tucker
Democratic
Elected County Executive
Bob Drewel
Democratic

The 1991 Snohomish County Executive election took place on November 5, 1991, to elect the county executive of Snohomish County, Washington. Incumbent Democratic County Executive Willis Tucker declined to run for re-election to a fourth term.

Four candidates ran to succeed Tucker: Democrats Bob Drewel, the President of Everett Community College, and farmer Bill Patrick, and Republicans Cliff Bailey, a State Senator, and Doug Smith, an attorney. In the blanket primary election, Drewel and Bailey won their parties' nominations by wide margins. Drewel received 34 percent of the vote to Patrick's 12 percent, and Bailey won 33 percent to Smith's 21 percent. However, the relatively even totals for Democratic and Republican candidates forecasted a close general election.

In the general election, Drewel significantly outraised Bailey, in part supported by campaign contributions from local developers. Drewel ultimately defeated Bailey, winning 53 percent of the vote.

== Primary election ==
=== Candidates ===
- Bob Drewel, President of Everett Community College (Democratic)
- Cliff Bailey, State Senator (Republican)
- Doug Smith, lawyer (Republican)
- Bill Patrick, farmer (Democratic)

==== Declined ====
- Bill Brubaker, County Councilman
- Willis Tucker, incumbent County Executive

=== Results ===
Blanket primary results
Party	Candidate	Votes	%
Democratic	Bob Drewel	15,584	33.73%
Republican	Cliff Bailey	15,246	33.00%
Republican	Doug Smith	9,658	20.90%
Democratic	Bill (Hardware) Patrick	5,713	12.37%
Total votes		46,201	100.00%

== General election ==
=== Results ===
1991 Snohomish County Executive election
Party	Candidate	Votes	%
Democratic	Bob Drewel	69,435	52.93%
Republican	Cliff Bailey	61,759	47.07%
Total votes		131,194	100.00%
Democratic hold			
