= 2023 Snohomish County Executive election =

- November 7, 2023
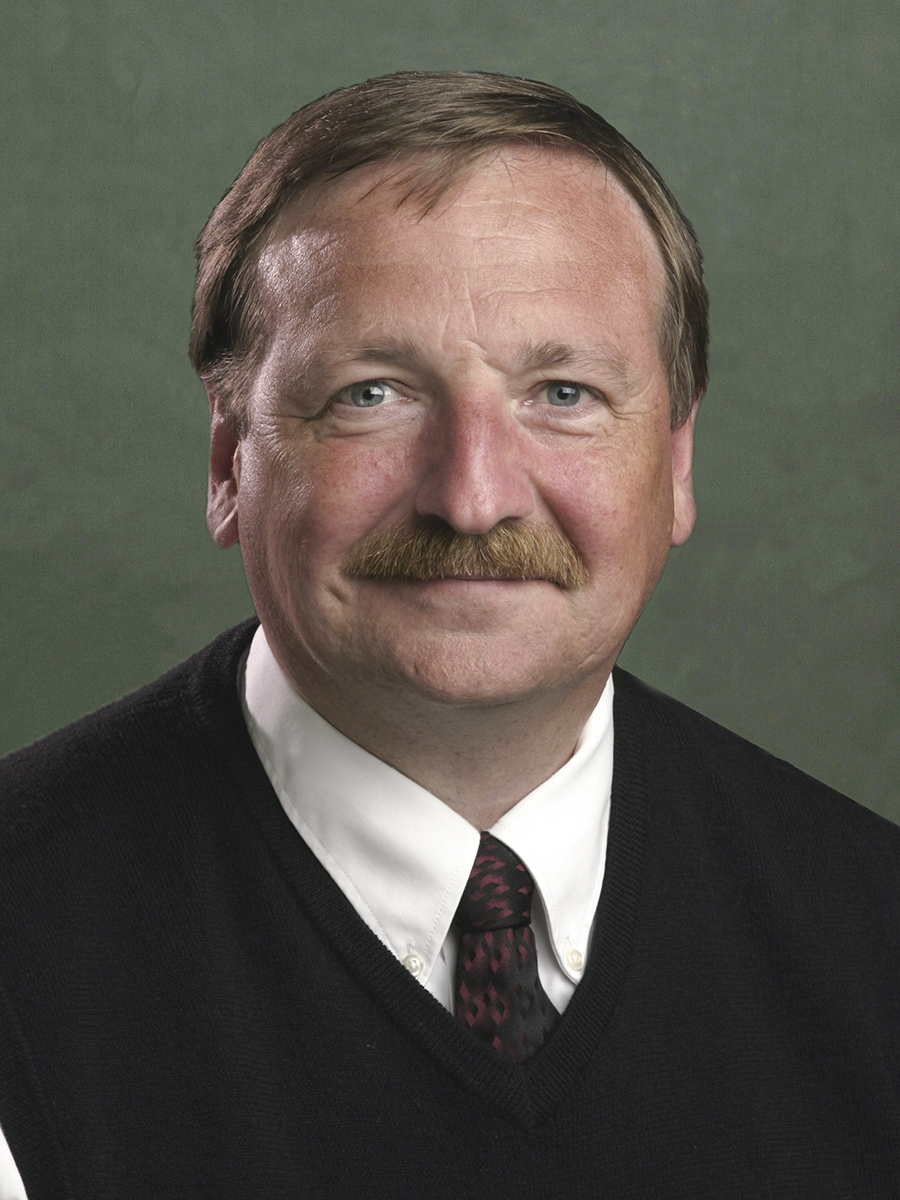

Nominee	Dave Somers	Bob Hagglund
Party	Democratic	Republican
Popular vote	109,852	72,675
Percentage	60.12%	39.78%
County Executive before election
Dave Somers
Democratic
Elected County Executive
Dave Somers
Democratic

The 2023 Snohomish County Executive election took place on November 7, 2023, to elect the county executive of Snohomish County, Washington. Incumbent Democratic County Executive Dave Somers ran for re-election to a third term. Somers was challenged by Republican Bob Hagglund, a data scientist, and Democrat Christopher Garnett, a small businessman.

In the primary election, Somers placed first by a wide margin, winning 52 percent of the vote. Hagglund placed second with 37 percent, and advanced to the general election against Somers. Somers defeated Hagglund in a landslide in the general election, winning his third term with 60 percent of the vote.

== Primary election ==
=== Candidates ===
- Dave Somers, incumbent County Executive (Democratic)
- Bob Hagglund, health care data scientist (Republican)
- Christopher Garnett, small businessman (Democratic)

=== Results ===
Blanket primary results
Party	Candidate	Votes	%
Democratic	Dave Somers (inc.)	70,324	52.23%
Republican	Bob Hagglund	50,067	37.18%
Democratic	Christopher Garnett	14,093	10.47%
Write-in		164	0.12%
Total votes		134,648	100.00%

== General election ==
=== Results ===
2023 Snohomish County Executive election
Party	Candidate	Votes	%
Democratic	Dave Somers (inc.)	109,852	60.12%
Republican	Bob Hagglund	72,675	39.78%
Write-in		186	0.10%
Total votes		182,713	100.00%
Democratic hold			
