= Snohomish County Executive =

Elected chief executive of Snohomish County, Washington, U.S.

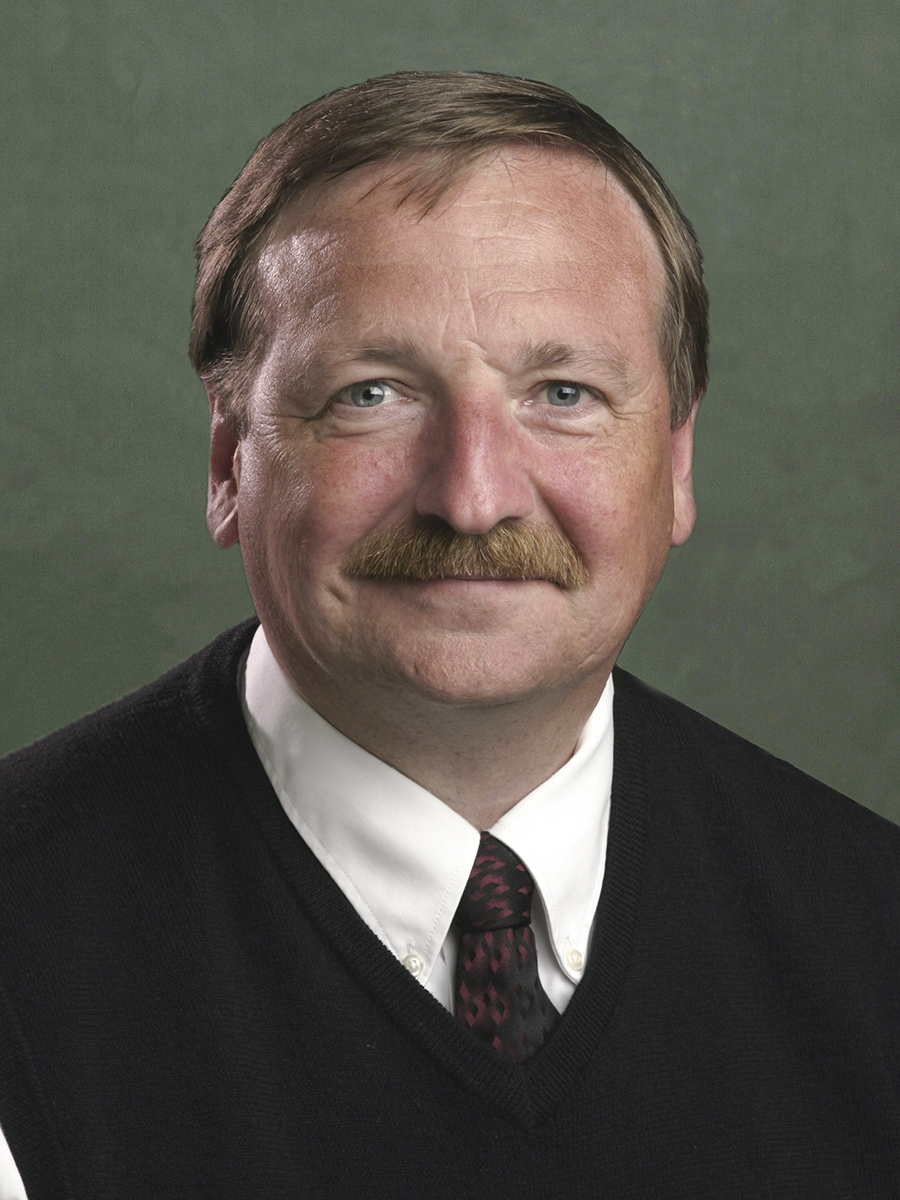
- Incumbent; Dave Somers since January 4, 2016
- Appointer: Electorate Snohomish County Council (unexpired terms)
- Term length: 4 years
- Inaugural holder: Willis Tucker
- Formation: May 1, 1980
- Website: Snohomish County Executive

The Snohomish County Executive is the head of the executive branch of Snohomish County, Washington. The position has four-year terms (with a term limit of three consecutive terms) and is a partisan office.

== History ==
County voters approved the adoption of a home-rule charter for Snohomish County on November 6, 1979, creating the position of a county executive and a five-member county council. Prior to the adoption, the county government was led by three commissioners elected at-large. The new position took effect on May 1, 1980, with Willis Tucker elected as the first executive.

== List of executives ==
Order	Executive	Party	Took office	Left office	Terms
1	Willis Tucker	Democratic	May 1, 1980	January 2, 1992	3
2	Bob Drewel	Democratic	January 2, 1992	January 5, 2004	3
3	Aaron Reardon	Democratic	January 5, 2004	May 31, 2013	2 1/2 (Note: Resigned before end of third term.)
4	John Lovick	Democratic	June 3, 2013	January 4, 2016	1/2 (Note: Appointed to finish Reardon's term.)
5	Dave Somers	Democratic	January 4, 2016	Incumbent	3 (Note: Executive Somers's third and final term expires in January 2028.)

== List of elections ==
Snohomish County Executive general election results, 1980–present
Year	Winning candidate	Party	Votes	Pct	Candidate	Party	Votes	Pct
1980	Willis Tucker	Democratic	13,085	48.74%	Gary A. Nelson	Republican	11,852	44.15%
1980	Willis Tucker	Democratic	13,085	48.74%	Louise A. Saluteen	Independent	1,910	7.11%
1983	Willis Tucker (incumbent)	Democratic	54,756	58.28%	Larry E. Countryman	Republican	39,194	31.72%
1987	Willis Tucker (incumbent)	Democratic	35,222	51.04%	Michael Glanz	Republican	33,782	48.96%
1991	Bob Drewel	Democratic	69,435	52.93%	Cliff Bailey	Republican	61,759	47.07%
1995	Bob Drewel (incumbent)	Democratic	70,921	55.94%	Douglas Smith	Republican	55,676	43.91%
1999	Bob Drewel (incumbent)	Democratic	90,240	54.95%	Lew Moore	Republican	73,563	44.80%
2003	Aaron Reardon	Democratic	64,068	51.77%	Dave Earling	Republican	59,433	48.03%
2007	Aaron Reardon (incumbent)	Democratic	104,008	65.02%	Jack Turk	Republican	55,419	34.65%
2011	Aaron Reardon (incumbent)	Democratic	104,710	55.18%	Mike Hope	Republican	84,400	44.47%
2014 (Note: Special election after resignation of Aaron Reardon to elect an executive to a one-year term.)	John Lovick (incumbent)	Democratic	111,837	55.52%	Carolyn Eslick	Republican	89,095	44.23%
2015	Dave Somers	Democratic	74,492	56.18%	John Lovick (incumbent)	Democratic	56,428	42.56%
2019	Dave Somers (incumbent)	Democratic	134,521	93.94%	Write-in (Note: Somers ran unopposed for his second term.)		8,681	6.06%
2023	Dave Somers (incumbent)	Democratic	109,852	60.12%	Bob Hagglund	Republican	72,675	39.78%

== See also ==
- King County Executive
- Pierce County Executive
- Whatcom County Executive
