= Hans Dunshee =

American politician from Washington

Member of the Snohomish County Council from the 5th district
- In office February 29, 2016 – November 29, 2016
- Preceded by: Dave Somers
- Succeeded by: Sam Low

Member of the Washington House of Representatives from the 44th district
- In office January 13, 2003 – April 18, 2016
- Preceded by: Dave Schmidt
- Succeeded by: John Lovick

Member of the Washington House of Representatives from the 39th, Position 1 district
- In office January 13, 1997 – January 13, 2003
- Preceded by: Val Stevens
- Succeeded by: Dan Kristiansen

Member of the Washington House of Representatives from the 39th, Position 2 district
- In office January 11, 1993 – January 9, 1995
- Preceded by: Art Sprenkle
- Succeeded by: John Koster

Personal details
- Born: October 26, 1953 (age 72) Los Angeles, California, U.S.
- Party: Democratic
- Spouse: Theresa Dunshee
- Education: University of Washington, Western Washington University

Hans M. Dunshee (born October 26, 1953) is an American businessman and politician of the Democratic Party. He is a former member of the Washington House of Representatives, representing the 44th Legislative District.

Dunshee was born in Los Angeles, California.

In April 2016, Dunshee resigned from the Washington House of Representatives in order to take a seat on the Snohomish County Council. After losing election to a full term on the Snohomish County Council, Dunshee took a job as the Political Director for the Humane Society of the United States in Washington, DC.

== Personal life ==
Dunshee's wife is Theresa Dunshee. Dunshee has one step-child. Dunshee and his family live in Snohomish, Washington.
