= 2011 Snohomish County Executive election =

- November 8, 2011
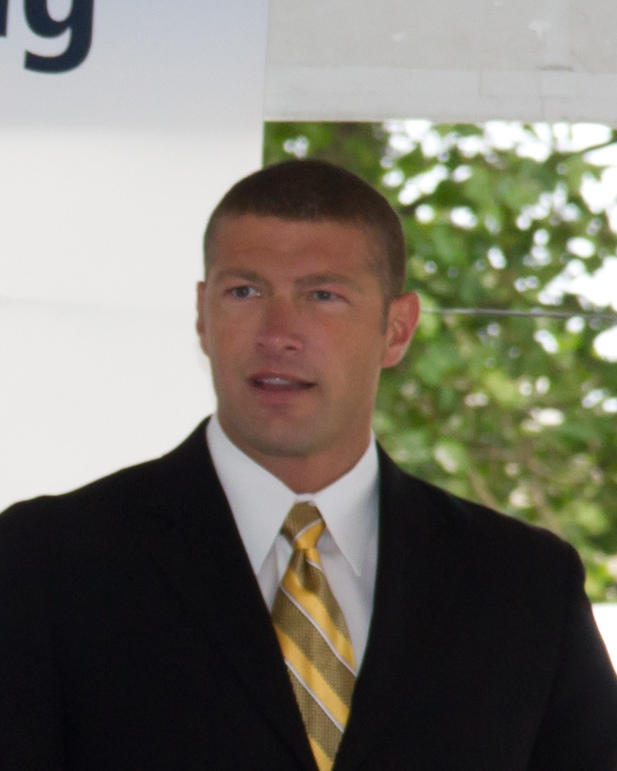

Nominee	Aaron Reardon	Jack Turk
Party	Democratic	Republican
Popular vote	104,008	55,419
Percentage	65.02%	34.65%
County Executive before election
Aaron Reardon
Democratic
Elected County Executive
Aaron Reardon
Democratic

The 2011 Snohomish County Executive election took place on November 8, 2011, to elect the county executive of Snohomish County, Washington. Incumbent Democratic County Executive Aaron Reardon ran for re-election to a third term. He was challenged by Republican State Representative Mike Hope.

In the primary election, Reardon led hope by a narrow margin, winning just 52 percent of the vote to Hope's 48 percent. The general election campaign was contentious, with Hope accusing one of Reardon's county staffers of filing ethics complaints against him. Reardon ultimately defeated Hope by a wide margin, winning 55 percent of the vote to Hope's 44 percent.

However, Reardon would not serve out his full term. Following allegations of an extramarital affair and using county resources for his re-election campaign, he resigned, effective May 31, 2013. Reardon's resignation elevated John Lovick as County Executive and triggered a 2014 special election.

== Primary election ==
=== Candidates ===
- Aaron Reardon, incumbent County Executive (Democratic)
- Mike Hope, State Representative (Republican)

==== Declined ====
- Mark Lamb, Mayor of Bothell
- Kathy Vaughn, Snohomish County Public Utility District Commissioner

=== Results ===
Blanket primary results
Party	Candidate	Votes	%
Democratic	Aaron Reardon (inc.)	51,576	52.09%
Republican	Mike Hope	47,132	47.61%
Write-in		298	0.30%
Total votes		99,006	100.00%

== General election ==
=== Results ===
2011 Snohomish County Executive election
Party	Candidate	Votes	%
Democratic	Aaron Reardon (inc.)	104,710	55.18%
Republican	Mike Hope	84,400	44.47%
Write-in		666	0.35%
Total votes		189,776	100.00%
Democratic hold			
