= 1987 Snohomish County Executive election =

- November 3, 1987

Nominee	Willis Tucker	Michael Glanz
Party	Democratic	Republican
Popular vote	35,222	33,782
Percentage	51.04%	48.96%
County Executive before election
Willis Tucker
Democratic
Elected County Executive
Willis Tucker
Democratic

The 1987 Snohomish County Executive election took place on November 3, 1987, to elect the county executive of Snohomish County, Washington. Incumbent Democratic County Executive Willis Tucker ran for re-election to a third term. He was challenged by Republican Michael Glanz, an architect who filed on the final day of candidate qualifying. In the primary election, Tucker placed first by a wide margin, winning 57 percent of the vote to Glanz's 43 percent.

In the general election, Tucker outraised Glanz and was viewed as the frontrunner, but Glanz ran an aggressive campaign with support from local Republicans. Tucker ultimately won re-election, but by only a narrow margin, receiving 51 percent of the vote to Gland's 49 percent.

== Primary election ==
=== Candidates ===
- Willis Tucker, incumbent County Executive (Democratic)
- Michael Glanz, architect (Republican)

=== Results ===
Blanket primary results
Party	Candidate	Votes	%
Democratic	Willis Tucker (inc.)	15,513	56.54%
Republican	Michael Glanz	11,925	43.46%
Total votes		27,438	100.00%

== General election ==
=== Results ===
1987 Snohomish County Executive election
Party	Candidate	Votes	%
Democratic	Willis Tucker (inc.)	35,222	51.04%
Republican	Michael Glanz	33,782	48.96%
Total votes		69,004	100.00%
Democratic hold			
