= 1983 Snohomish County Executive election =

- November 8, 1983

Nominee	Willis Tucker	Larry Countryman
Party	Democratic	Republican
Popular vote	54,756	39,194
Percentage	58.28%	41.72%
County Executive before election
Willis Tucker
Democratic
Elected County Executive
Willis Tucker
Democratic

The 1983 Snohomish County Executive election took place on November 8, 1983, to elect the county executive of Snohomish County, Washington. Incumbent Democratic County Executive Willis Tucker ran for re-election to a second term. As the first county executive, Tucker was tasked with reorganizing county government, and internal party opposition to his reorganization scheme prompted an intra-party challenge. Three Democratic opponents ran against him, and his leading opponent was businessman Court Sheehan.

However, despite facing opposition from the local Democratic establishment, Tucker placed first in the primary by a wide margin, winning 40 percent of the vote to Sheehan's 32 percent. Republican Larry Countryman, a Snohomish City Councilman, placed third with 21 percent of the vote and advanced to the general election against Tucker. Tucker ultimately defeated Countryman in a landslide, winning 58 percent of the vote.

== Primary election ==
=== Candidates ===
- Willis Tucker, incumbent County Executive (Democratic)
- Court Sheehan, businessman (Democratic)
- Larry Countryman, Snohomish City Councilman
- Paul Roberts, retired Teamster
- John Patric, perennial candidate

=== Results ===
Blanket primary results
Party	Candidate	Votes	%
Democratic	Willis Tucker	13,175	40.23%
Democratic	Court Sheehan	10,319	31.51%
Republican	Larry Countryman	6,977	21.30%
Democratic	Paul Roberts	1,576	4.81%
Democratic	John Patric	705	2.15%
Total votes		32,752	100.00%

== General election ==
=== Results ===
1983 Snohomish County Executive election
Party	Candidate	Votes	%
Democratic	Willis Tucker (inc.)	56,756	58.28%
Republican	Larry Countryman	39,194	41.72%
Total votes		93,950	100.00%
Democratic hold			
