= 1999 Snohomish County Executive election =

- November 2, 1999

Nominee	Bob Drewel	Lew Moore
Party	Democratic	Republican
Popular vote	90,240	73,563
Percentage	54.95%	44.80%
County Executive before election
Bob Drewel
Democratic
Elected County Executive
Bob Drewel
Democratic

The 1999 Snohomish County Executive election took place on November 2, 1999, to elect the county executive of Snohomish County, Washington. Incumbent Democratic County Executive Bob Drewel ran for re-election to a third term. He faced three challengers: Republican Lew Moore, the chief of staff to Congressman Jack Metcalf, and Democrats Dale Smith, a county secession advocate, and Mardi Jorgensen, a businesswoman.

In the primary election, Drewel placed first by a wide margin, winning 46 percent of the vote and advancing to the general election with Moore, who received 35 percent. Drewel ultimately defeated Moore by a wide margin in the general election, winning 55 percent of the vote to Moore's 45 percent.

After the election, Drewel disclosed that he had been diagnosed with prostate cancer on September 13, the day before the primary election, and had opted not to disclose it to avoid his health becoming an issue in the campaign.

== Primary election ==
=== Candidates ===
- Bob Drewel, incumbent County Executive (Democratic)
- Lew Moore, Chief of Staff to Congressman Jack Metcalf (Republican)
- Dale Smith, mechanic, Freedom County secession activist (Democratic)
- Mardi Jorgensen, businesswoman (Democratic)

=== Results ===
Blanket primary results
Party	Candidate	Votes	%
Democratic	Bob Drewel (inc.)	31,933	46.32%
Republican	Lew Moore	23,872	34.63%
Democratic	Dale R. Smith	7,039	10.21%
Democratic	Mardi Jorgensen	5,808	8.43%
Write-in		283	0.41%
Total votes		68,935	100.00%

== General election ==
=== Results ===
1999 Snohomish County Executive election
Party	Candidate	Votes	%
Democratic	Bob Drewel (inc.)	90,240	54.95%
Republican	Lew Moore	73,563	44.80%
Write-in		410	0.25%
Total votes		164,213	100.00%
Democratic hold			
