= John Koster =

American politician from Washington

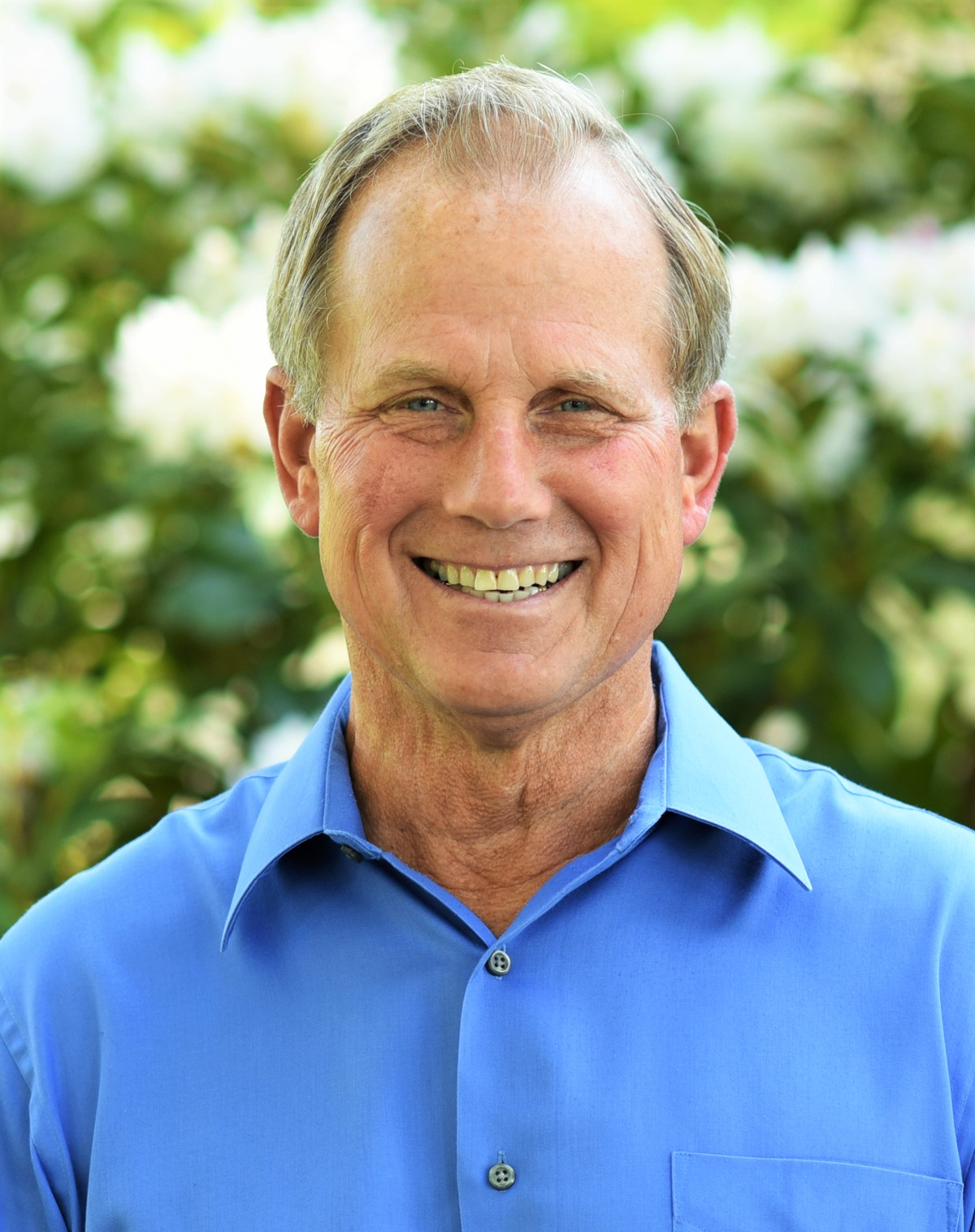

Member of the Washington House of Representatives from the 39th district
- In office January 3, 1995 – January 8, 2001
- Preceded by: Hans Dunshee
- Succeeded by: Kirk Pearson
- In office January 9, 2017 – August 31, 2017
- Preceded by: Elizabeth Scott
- Succeeded by: Carolyn Eslick

Chair of the Snohomish County Council
- In office January 1, 2004 – January 3, 2005
- Preceded by: Gary Nelson
- Succeeded by: Gary Nelson

Member of the Snohomish County Council from the 1st district
- In office January 1, 2002 – January 1, 2014
- Preceded by: Mike Ashley
- Succeeded by: Ken Klein

Personal details
- Born: John Marvin Koster; September 8, 1951 (age 75) Arlington, Washington, U.S.
- Party: Republican
- Spouse: Vicki Koster
- Children: 4
- Education: Everett Community College

John Marvin Koster (born September 8, 1951) is an American politician who served as a member of the Washington House of Representatives, representing the 39th district from 1995 to 2001 and again in 2017. A member of the Republican Party, he previously served as a member of the Snohomish County Council, representing the 1st district from 2002 to 2014.

== Career ==
On November 8, 1994, Koster won the election and became a Republican member of Washington House of Representatives for District 39, Position 2. Koster defeated Hans Dunshee with 52.70% of the votes. Koster's term began on January 3, 1995. On November 5, 1996, as an incumbent, Koster won the election and continued serving District 39, Position 2. Koster defeated Jeff Soth with 52.78% of the votes. On November 3, 1998, as an incumbent, Koster won the election and continued serving District 39, Position 2. Koster defeated Patricia Patterson with 51.87% of the votes.

On November 6, 2001, Koster was elected to the Snohomish County Council, District 1. Koster defeated incumbent Democrat Mike Ashley and others with 51.65% of the votes. As an incumbent, Koster was reelected in November 2005 and November 2009, representing Council District 1.

Koster has three times ran unsuccessfully for the United States House of Representatives in 2000, 2010, and 2012. In November 2015, Koster was elected Charter Review Commissioner for Snohomish County.

On December 20, 2013 it was announced that the term-limited Koster would be the first-ever Snohomish County Ombudsman after his term in the Snohomish County Council ended on January 1, 2014.

On November 8, 2016, Koster won the election and became a Republican member of the Washington House of Representatives for District 39, Position 2. Koster defeated Ronda Metcalf with 60.96% of the votes. In July 2017, Koster announced his retirement from the State House to lead the County Road Administration Board as its executive director. He was succeeded by Sultan mayor Carolyn Eslick.

== Personal life ==
Koster's wife is Vicki Koster. They have four children. Koster and her family live in Arlington, Washington.
