= Kevin Quigley (politician) =

American politician from Washington

Member of the Washington Senate from the 39th district
- In office 1993–1996
- Succeeded by: Val Stevens

Personal details
- Born: Lake Stevens, Washington
- Party: Democratic
- Education: George Washington University (BA); Harvard Law School (LLM); New York University School of Law (JD)

Kevin Quigley is an American politician from Buckley, Washington. He served in the Washington Senate from 1993 to 1996. He also ran for Washington's 2nd congressional district in 1996, but lost to Jack Metcalf. He later served as Secretary of the Washington State Department of Social and Health Services from 2013 to 2016.
