= Val Stevens =

American politician from Washington

Member of the Washington House of Representatives from the 39th, Position 1 district
- In office January 3, 1993 – January 3, 1997
- Preceded by: John Wynne
- Succeeded by: Hans Dunshee

Member of the Washington Senate from the 39th district
- In office January 3, 1997 – January 3, 2013
- Preceded by: Kevin Quigley
- Succeeded by: Kirk Pearson

Personal details
- Party: Republican
- Spouse: Keith
- Children: 2
- Occupation: Politician
- Other names: Valera Stevens, Valera A. Stevens

Valera A. Stevens is an American politician from Washington. Stevens is a Republican and a former member of the Washington House of Representatives and Washington State Senate.

== Career ==
Stevens is an interior decorator.

On November 3, 1992, Stevens won the election and became a Republican member of Washington House of Representatives for District 39, Position 1. Stevens defeated Dennis Lebow with 52.44% of the votes. On November 8, 1994, as an incumbent, Stevens won the election and continued serving District 39, Position 1. Stevens defeated Steve Hobbs with 63.84% of the votes.

On November 5, 1996, Stevens won the election and became a Republican member of Washington State Senate for District 39. Stevens defeated Patricia Patterson with 55.23% of the votes. On November 7, 2000, as an incumbent, Stevens won the election and continued serving District 39. Stevens defeated Freda Smith and Craig Chase with 54.94% of the votes. On November 2, 2004, as an incumbent, Stevens won the election and continued serving District 39. Stevens defeated Susanne Olson with 54.33% of the votes. On November 4, 2008, as an incumbent, Stevens won the election and continued serving District 39. Stevens defeated Fred Walser with 58.55% of the votes.

== Personal life ==
Stevens' husband is Keith. They have two children. Stevens and her family live in Olympia, Washington.
