= Puget Sound Regional Council =

- Abbreviation: PSRC
- Formation: 1956
- Type: Metropolitan planning organization
- Headquarters: 1201 Third Avenue, Suite 500
- Location: Seattle, Washington, United States
- Coordinates: 47°36′26″N 122°20′10″W
- Region served: Puget Sound region
- Services: Transportation and urban planning, economic development, data collection and research
- Members: 105
- President: Dave Somers
- Executive Director: Josh Brown
- Budget: $45.9 million (2026–27)
- Staff: 70 (2026–27)
- Website: psrc.org
- Formerly called: Puget Sound Council of Governments

The Puget Sound Regional Council (PSRC) is a metropolitan planning organization based in Seattle, Washington, United States. It is tasked with the development of policies for transportation planning, economic development, and growth management throughout the four-county Seattle metropolitan area in the Puget Sound region. It is a forum for member cities, towns, counties, public transit agencies, port districts, Native American tribes, and state agencies to address regional issues.

== Geography and membership ==
The Puget Sound Regional Council serves the central Puget Sound region of Washington state, which includes the entire Seattle metropolitan area. The region comprises up of King, Kitsap, Pierce, and Snohomish counties, which collectively encompass 6,267 square miles (16,230 km^{2}) and comprise 77 cities and towns. The five major cities are Seattle and Bellevue in King County, Tacoma in Pierce County, Everett in Snohomish County, and Bremerton in Kitsap County. As of 2025, the region's population was estimated to be over 4.5 million, or 56 percent of Washington state's population.

The PSRC has 105 total member governments, organizations, and agencies. The full and statutory members include the four constituent counties within the metropolitan area, 77 of 82 incorporated cities and towns, four federally recognized Indian tribes, four port authorities, and six public transit operators. Associate members include the University of Washington, Washington State University, Island County, and local water utilities.

== History ==
=== Early history (1956–1991) ===
In 1956 the four counties of the Puget Sound region established the Puget Sound Regional Planning Conference, which changed its name to the Puget Sound Governmental Conference (PSGC) in 1958. It launched the Puget Sound Regional Transportation Study (PSRTS) in 1962 with support from the Washington State Highway Commission, the U.S. Bureau of Public Roads (predecessor of the Federal Highway Administration), and the U.S. Department of Housing and Urban Development. The study, completed in 1967, offered recommendations regarding transportation policy as well as land-use planning; its publication set the precedent of taking on "transportation planning duties previously done by Washington State".

Its membership continued to expand to smaller suburban cities and tribal councils. In 1973, Washington governor Daniel J. Evans designated PSGC as an metropolitan planning organization (MPO) to fulfill requirements set by the Federal Aid Highway Act of 1973. Two years later it decided to reorganize as the Puget Sound Council of Governments (PSCOG) and continued to expand.

=== Puget Sound Regional Council (1991–present) ===
The Puget Sound Regional Council (PSRC) came into being in its current form in 1991 by an interlocal agreement and was designated an MPO by Washington Governor Booth Gardner. This occurred at the same time Congress passed the federal Intermodal Surface Transportation Efficiency Act (ISTEA), which allowed for a larger regional role in planning. It was the "first time" that transportation projects were selected by elected officials with significant public input.

The agency was headquartered at Waterfront Place in Downtown Seattle for most of its history. PSRC announced in 2023 that they would move to a fifth-story space at 1201 Third Avenue with the signing of a 13.5-year lease. The new office opened on January 25, 2024.

== Programs ==
PSRC conducts long-range planning (20–30 years in the future) for growth management, transportation, and economic development. It also collects regional data on demographics, housing, unemployment, building permits, and traffic counts, and analyzes to inform public policy.

=== Transportation funding ===
PSRC is responsible for the disbursement of transportation funding from the federal government, primarily through grants. The regional Transportation Improvement Program (TIP), a database of projects being funded through these grants, is maintained by the PSRC. Some examples of such projects include new bridges in Tacoma and Bothell, more efficient traffic signal timing in Redmond, and light rail construction by Sound Trnsit.

=== VISION 2040 ===
VISION 2040 is PSRC's strategy to ensure that Puget Sound region residents have a high quality of life come 2040, when the region's population is expected to reach 5 million. The document analyzes policies in response to the needs of housing, economic development, transportation, and the environment. It identifies infrastructure investments that would contribute to the region's and its residents' well-being and suggests a financing plan for the investments.

=== Eastside Rail Corridor ===
The "BNSF Corridor Preservation Study" was prepared in 2006–2007 to evaluate the potential of the Eastside Rail Corridor for public use by an advisory committee working with HDR Engineering, a consultancy, with grants from the Federal Transit Administration, the Federal Highway Administration, and the Washington State Department of Transportation. It recommended replacing most of the Woodinville Subdivision rail line that runs through Seattle's eastern suburbs with a bicycle and walking trail, as well as preserving freight services along the northern segment. For the longer term (10–40 years), the study recommended planning for high-capacity commuter rail.

In 2008 the Washington State Legislature requested that Sound Transit and PSRC evaluate the feasibility of commuter rail in the BNSF Woodinville Subdivision along the east side of Lake Washington. The report, prepared by Parsons Brinckerhoff, found that it would be "feasible through a variety of capital improvements to facilitate higher speeds" within the range of capital cost estimates of similar projects in the United States, "although at the high end of that range" due to the dilapidated infrastructure and the absence of safety and communications systems.

=== Prosperity Partnership ===
The Prosperity Partnership is a coalition of public- and private-sector organizations as well as nonprofits that is "working to promote a strong central Puget Sound economy". It was launched in November 2004 and has accrued more than 300 member organizations. Achievements include:

- Founded the Washington Clean Technology Alliance, the first trade association dedicated to clean technology in the state (2007)
- Published a report on the "size, scope, segments, and growth potential" of the region's clean tech cluster as well as its niche advantages and how to pair them with export-oriented industries (Nov. 2009)
- Founded the Washington Global Health Alliance, which markets Washington as an "epicenter of global health discovery, development, and delivery" (2007)
- Published a foreign direct investment (FDI) toolkit to aid local and state governments in attracting FDI (Jan. 2009)
- Established the International Regions Benchmarking Consortium, a gathering of "metropolitan regions that find it mutually beneficial to learn from each other" by comparing data and research findings, with financial support from Microsoft and Boeing (2008)
- Created the Washington Defense Partnership to serve as a central coordinating body for the military presence and mission in Washington as well as families, veterans, and the defense-contracting community (2009)
- Spearheaded efforts to secure a "Transportation Partnership Account" worth $8.5 billion that would target "safety, freight, efficiency, and capacity projects" (2005)
- Launched the Washington Aerospace Partnership, a "coalition of business, labor, and local government leaders working to sustain and grow aerospace industry jobs in Washington", which is home to more than 600 aerospace manufacturers that employ more than 100,000 people

== Governance and funding ==
The Puget Sound Regional Council is governed by elected officials from its member government agencies, who meet annually as a General Assembly to approve the budget and elect new leaders. A 36‑member Executive Board meets monthly to make decisions on behalf of the General Assembly, along with several advisory boards composed of local elected officials and representatives of business, labor, environmental, and community interests. The president and vice president of the Executive Board serve a term of one year and are elected at the annual meeting of the General Assembly.

The federal government provides grants that comprise approximately 70 percent of PSRC's funding. The remaining includes approximately 6 percent from state government grants and 25 percent from dues paid by members and local entities. The dues for cities and counties are calculated based on their population as well as the assessed property value within their jurisdictions.
