= Gary A. Nelson =

American politician

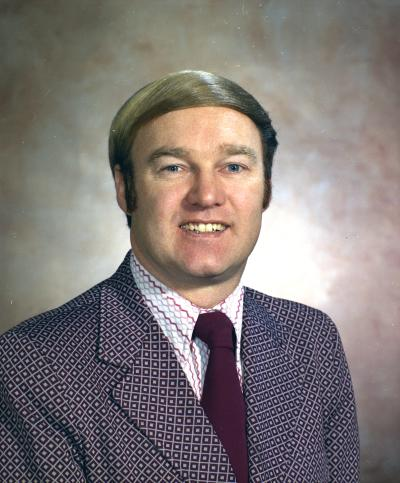
- Nelson in 1973

Majority Leader of the Washington House of Representatives
- In office January 12, 1981 – January 10, 1983
- Preceded by: Dick King
- Succeeded by: Denny Heck

Minority Leader of the Washington House of Representatives
- In office January 10, 1983 – January 14, 1985
- Preceded by: Wayne Ehlers
- Succeeded by: Sim Wilson

Member of the Washington Senate from the 21st district
- In office January 12, 1987 – November 23, 1994
- Preceded by: Mike McManus
- Succeeded by: Jeannette Wood

Member of the Washington House of Representatives from the 21st district
- In office January 8, 1973 – January 12, 1987
- Preceded by: Bill Kiskaddon
- Succeeded by: John Beck

Chair of the Snohomish County Council
- In office January 3, 2005 – January 1, 2006
- Preceded by: John Koster
- Succeeded by: Kirke Sievers
- In office January 1, 2002 – January 1, 2004
- Succeeded by: John Koster

Member of the Snohomish County Council from the 3rd district
- In office November 9, 1994 – January 1, 2008
- Preceded by: Al Schweppe
- Succeeded by: Mike Cooper

Personal details
- Born: April 11, 1936 (age 90) Spokane, Washington, U.S.
- Party: Republican

Gary A. Nelson (born April 11, 1936) is an American former politician in the state of Washington. He served in the Washington House of Representatives and Washington State Senate as a Republican from the 21st District.
