= Jeralita Costa =

American politician

Member of the Washington House of Representatives from the 38th district
- In office 1995–1999

Member of the Washington Senate from the 38th district
- In office 1999–2003

Personal details
- Born: September 18, 1959 (age 66) San Diego, California
- Party: Democratic

Jeralita "Jeri" Costa (born September 18, 1959) is an American politician. She is a Democrat, and represented District 38 in the Washington House of Representatives which included parts of Snohomish County including Everett and Marysville, from 1995 to 1999. She was a state senator from 1999 to 2003.

Costa serves as a Community Victim Liaison with the Washington State Department of Corrections (DOC). She is an advocate for female prisoners.
