= Carolyn Eslick =

American politician from Washington

Member of the Washington House of Representatives from the 39th district
- Incumbent
- Assumed office September 20, 2017 Serving with Sam Low
- Preceded by: John Koster

Personal details
- Born: Carolyn Louise Wand; 1950 (age 75–76) Portland, Oregon, U.S.
- Party: Republican
- Spouse: Chuck
- Children: 6
- Education: Everett Community College, Portland State University
- Occupation: Politician
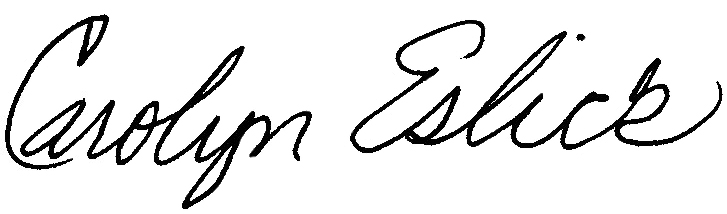
- Signature

Carolyn Louise Eslick (née Wand, born 1950) is an American politician in Washington state. Eslick serves as a Republican member of the Washington House of Representatives for District 39, Position 2. Eslick is the former mayor and first female mayor of Sultan, Washington.

== Education ==
In 1979, Eslick studied Computer Programming in Portland State University. In 1998, Eslick studied Political Science in Everett Community College.

== Career ==
Eslick is the former owner of a restaurant in Sultan, Washington. Eslick is the founder of GroWashington.

Eslick was appointed to the Sultan City Council in 1996 and was reelected to the Council in 1998. In 2008, Eslick was elected mayor of Sultan, Washington, until October 2017. Eslick was the first female mayor of Sultan, Washington.

Eslick first ran for the state legislature in 2001, losing in the Republican primary to Dan Kristiansen. In 2014, Eslick lost her campaign for Snohomish County Executive against John Lovick.

Following the resignation of John Koster, Eslick was one of three Republican candidates nominated to fill the vacancy, along with former Representative Elizabeth Scott and Georgene Faries. On September 21, the King, Skagit, and Snohomish County Councils voted to confirm Eslick. She was immediately sworn in on September 20, 2017.

== Personal life ==
In 1979, Eslick moved to Sultan, Washington. Eslick's husband is Chuck. They have six children. Eslick and her family live in Sultan, Washington.

== See also ==
- Washington's 39th Legislative District
- Washington State Legislature
- Washington House of Representatives
