= Dave Somers =

American politician and fisheries biologist

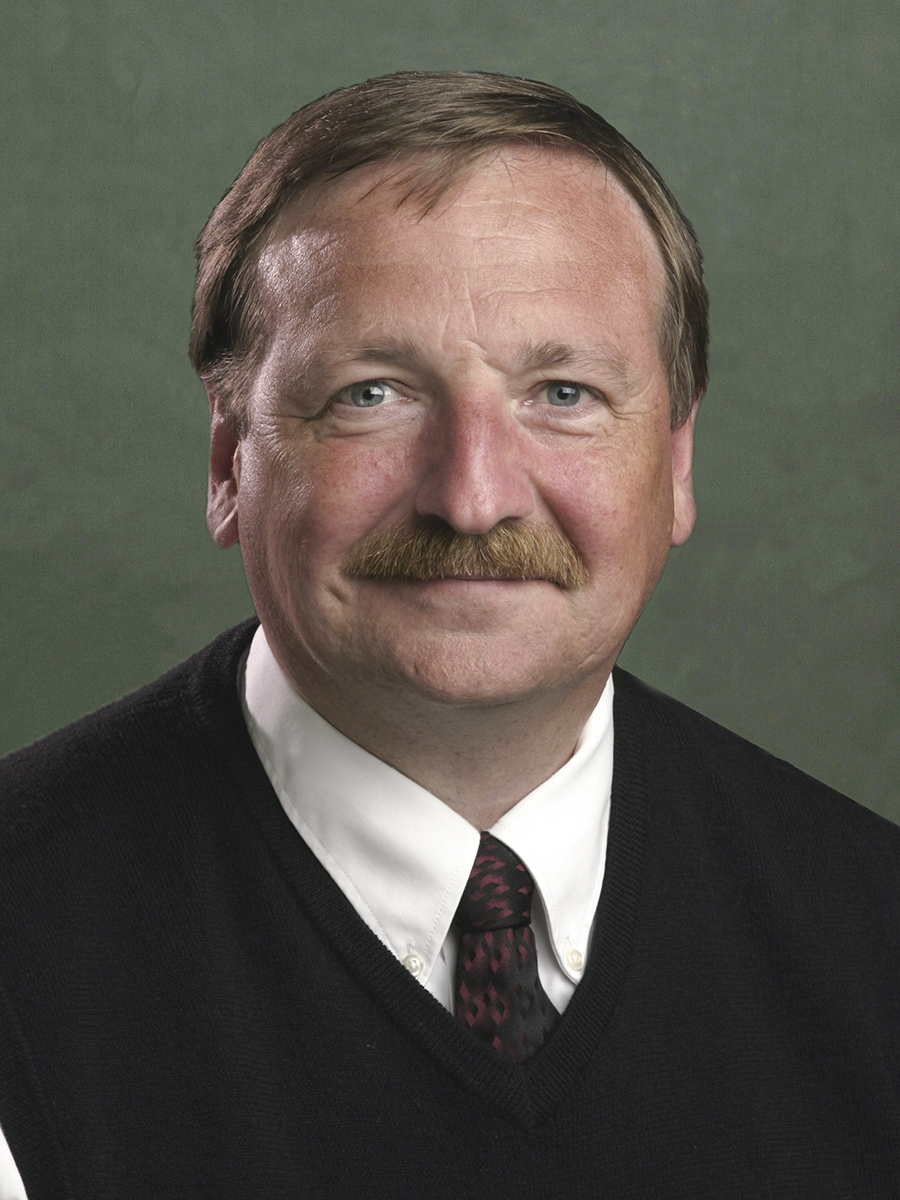

5th Snohomish County Executive
- Incumbent
- Assumed office January 4, 2016
- Preceded by: John Lovick

Chair of the Snohomish County Council
- In office January 1, 2014 – January 4, 2016
- Preceded by: Stephanie Wright
- Succeeded by: Terry Ryan
- In office January 1, 2010 – January 1, 2012
- Preceded by: Mike Cooper
- Succeeded by: Brian Sullivan
- In office January 1, 2008 – January 1, 2009
- Preceded by: Dave Gossett
- Succeeded by: Mike Cooper

Member of the Snohomish County Council from the 5th district
- In office January 1, 2006 – January 4, 2016
- Preceded by: Jeff Sax
- Succeeded by: Hans Dunshee
- In office January 1, 1998 – January 1, 2002
- Preceded by: R.C. Johnson
- Succeeded by: Jeff Sax

Personal details
- Born: 1953 (age 72–73) Napa, California, U.S.
- Party: Democratic
- Spouse: Elaine Somers
- Education: University of Washington (BS, MS)
- Occupation: Fisheries biologist

David J. Somers (born 1953) is an American politician and fisheries biologist serving as the Snohomish County Executive, an office he has held since 2016. Somers previously served on the Snohomish County Council, representing the 5th district in the eastern portion of the county.

== Early life and career ==
Somers was raised in Napa, California and studied at Lewis & Clark College in Portland, Oregon, before moving to the Seattle area to attend the University of Washington. There, he earned a bachelor's degree in fisheries science and later returned to complete a master's degree in forest ecology. Somers was employed as a fisheries biologist by the Tulalip Tribes from 1979 to 1997.

== Career ==
=== County Council ===
Somers was elected to the Snohomish County Council from the 5th district in 1997, defeating incumbent Democrat R.C. "Swede" Johnson in the primary election and facing a Republican write-in candidate in the general election. Somers was elected on a platform of making real estate developers accountable for strains on infrastructure created by new housing in the county, including roads and schools.

Somers was defeated in 2001 by Republican Jeff Sax, whose campaign called Somers a "committed socialist" before retracting the statement. Sax favored local control of land use, opposing the state's Washington State Growth Management Act and federal policies. Somers campaigned again in 2005, facing Sax for his former council seat, and won by a narrow margin. Somers was re-elected to a third term in 2009, defeating Republican restaurant owner Steve Dana.

During his time on the County Council, Somers focused on land use regulation and strengthening environmental protections.

=== County Executive ===
Somers announced his candidacy for the county executive office in May 2015, challenging incumbent Democrat John Lovick, appointed to the position in 2013 after the resignation of Aaron Reardon. In the primary election, Somers narrowly beat Lovick, and the two Democrats advanced to the general election ahead of two Republicans and an independent candidate. Somers won the general election and was sworn into office as the county's fifth executive in January 2016. State Representative Hans Dunshee was chosen in February to complete the rest of Somers's term in the County Council.

In addition to his duties as County Executive, Somers joined the Sound Transit Board in January 2016 and was named the board chair in January 2017. Somers was also elected the vice president of the Puget Sound Regional Council, a regional planning organization, in January 2016.

Somers ran unopposed for his second term in the 2019 election. He ran for a third term in 2023 and advanced from the primary election with 52 percent of votes alongside Republican challenger Bob Hagglund. Somers defeated Hagglund in the general election with 60 percent of votes and will serve his final term (due to term limits) from 2024 to 2028.

== Personal life ==
Somers met his wife Elaine while the two were in the University of Washington Husky Marching Band. Somers played the tuba for two years, served as Drum Major for three years, and marched playing bass drum at the 1978 Rose Bowl.
