= Bob Drewel =

Retired American politician

2nd Executive Director of Puget Sound Regional Council
- In office January 5, 2004 – January 2, 2014
- Preceded by: Mary McCumber
- Succeeded by: Josh Brown

2nd Snohomish County Executive
- In office January 2, 1992 – January 5, 2004
- Preceded by: Willis Tucker
- Succeeded by: Aaron Reardon

Personal details
- Born: 1945 or 1946 (age 79–80) Seattle, Washington
- Party: Democratic
- Education: University of Washington (BA)

Robert J. Drewel (born 1945–46) is an American retired politician from Washington state. Drewel served as the county executive of Snohomish County, Washington from 1992 to 2004 and as the executive director of the Puget Sound Regional Council from 2004 to 2014. Prior to his career in politics, he was president of Everett Community College and a labor and personnel relations consultant.

== Early life ==
Drewel was born in Seattle, and was raised in Seattle and on his family's alfalfa and grape farm in Kennewick. He graduated from Ingraham High School in Seattle and attended Columbia Basin Junior College, Central Washington University and the University of Washington. He graduated in 1970 from the University of Washington with a bachelor's degree in history.

== Career ==
=== Early career ===
Drewel worked as an assistant sales manager at the Rhodes Brothers department store in Seattle and later for a labor-relations firm before moving to Everett. Drewel was hired by Everett Community College in 1974 to work in their personnel department and twice served as interim president in 1981 and 1984. He was appointed permanently to the position in December 1984, and became interested in politics while involved in the college's lobbying efforts in the Washington State Legislature. During his tenure at the college, Drewel led efforts to rebuild the campus library after it was destroyed in a fire, as well as paying back $1 million in debt to the state after a miscalculation in enrollment numbers, and the establishment of early-retirement and retraining programs for staff.

=== Political career ===
Drewel was encouraged to run for the office of Snohomish County Executive by local Democrats, including outgoing executive Willis Tucker, and announced his candidacy in April 1991. He received the early endorsement of the Snohomish County Labor Council over Republican candidate and state senator Cliff Bailey, who he narrowly defeated in the September primary; both candidates advanced to the general election in November, defeating two other candidates from their respective parties. Drewel won 53 percent of votes in the general election, and pledged to "restore confidence in government".

Drewel was re-elected to a second term in 1995, and a third term in 1999. He was term limited after his 1999 re-election, and was seen as a possible Democratic gubernatorial candidate for the 2004 election.

Drewel was appointed the executive director of the Puget Sound Regional Council in December 2003, and served in that position until his retirement on January 2, 2014. He later served as interim chancellor for the Everett satellite campus of Washington State University in 2014.

== Personal life ==
Drewel married his wife Cheryl in 1968 and raised two daughters with her at their home in Arlington.

Drewel was well known as a charity auctioneer, a role he began in the 1980s, raising money for United Way and other local charities. He also worked as a part-time cowboy and opened the annual Evergreen State Fair rodeo in cowboy boots and jeans.

Shortly after his election to a third term in 1999, Drewel was successfully treated for prostate cancer.
