= John Lovick (politician) =

American politician and law enforcement officer from Washington

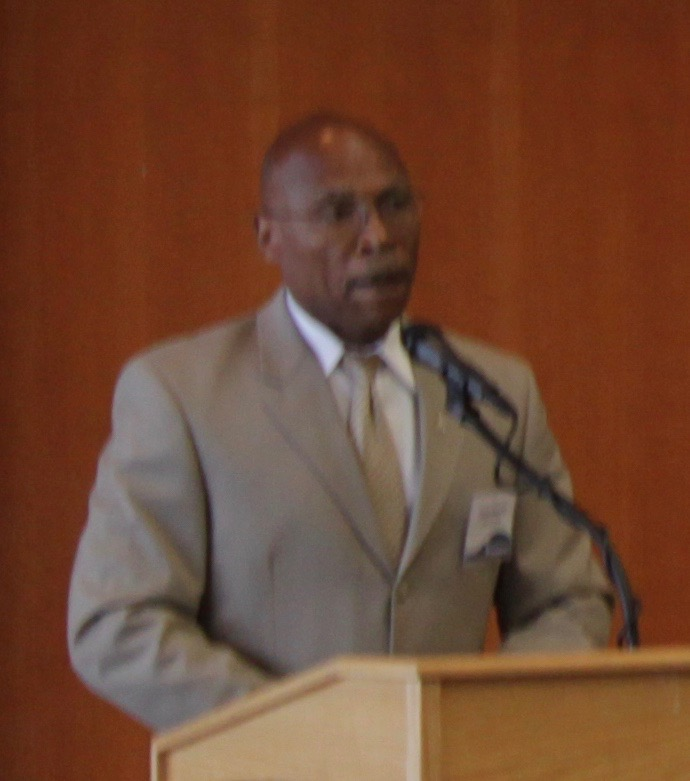
- Lovick in 2015

Member of the Washington State Senate from the 44th district
- Incumbent
- Assumed office December 15, 2021
- Preceded by: Steve Hobbs

Speaker of the Washington House of Representatives
- Acting; May 9, 2019 – January 13, 2020
- Preceded by: Frank Chopp
- Succeeded by: Laurie Jinkins

Speaker pro tempore of the Washington House of Representatives
- In office January 8, 2018 – January 11, 2021
- Preceded by: Tina Orwall
- Succeeded by: Tina Orwall
- In office January 13, 2003 – January 5, 2008
- Preceded by: John Pennington; Val Ogden
- Succeeded by: Jeff Morris

Member of the Washington House of Representatives from the 44th district
- In office June 9, 2016 – December 15, 2021
- Preceded by: Hans Dunshee
- Succeeded by: Brandy Donaghy
- In office January 11, 1999 – January 5, 2008
- Preceded by: Bill Thompson
- Succeeded by: Liz Loomis

4th Snohomish County Executive
- In office June 3, 2013 – January 4, 2016
- Preceded by: Aaron Reardon
- Succeeded by: Dave Somers

Personal details
- Born: Johnny Ray Lovick; May 9, 1951 (age 75) Shreveport, Louisiana, U.S.
- Party: Democratic
- Spouse: Karen
- Children: 5
- Education: Shoreline Community College (AA)

Johnny Ray Lovick (born May 9, 1951) is an American politician and law enforcement officer serving as a member of the Washington State Senate, representing the 44th district since 2021. A member of the Democratic Party, he was appointed in December 2021 to fill a vacancy created by the resignation of Steve Hobbs to become Washington secretary of state.

== Career ==
Lovick previously served in the House from 1999 until 2007 and 2016 until 2021, as Snohomish County sheriff, and on the Mill Creek city council. From 2013 to 2016, Lovick was the Snohomish County Executive, appointed after the resignation of Aaron Reardon; Lovick lost to Dave Somers in the 2015 election.

Lovick has served as a sergeant of the Washington State Patrol since 1997.

During the 2021 legislative session, Lovick's first proposed bill to make Pickleball the official sport of Washington passed and became official in March 2022. In the 2022 general election, Lovick won a full term for the state Senate with over 58% of the votes cast.

== Awards ==
- 2023, ParentMap Superhero.
- 2020 Legislator of the Year. Presented by The Washington State Fraternal Order of Police.

== Personal life ==
Lovick and his wife, Karen, have 5 children.

== Electoral history ==
=== 1993 ===
1993 Mill Creek City Council, Position 2 General Election results
Party	Candidate	Votes	%
Nonpartisan	John Lovick	1,625	62.98
Nonpartisan	Steven H. Hypse	955	37.02
Total votes		2,580	100.00%

=== 1997 ===
1997 Mill Creek City Council, Position 2 General Election results
Party	Candidate	Votes	%
Nonpartisan	John Lovick	2,343	98.78
Write-in		29	1.22
Total votes		2,372	100.00%

=== 1998 ===
1998 Washington State House of Representatives, District 44 General Election results
Party	Candidate	Votes	%
Democratic	John Lovick	19,394	51.20
Republican	Bill Thompson (incumbent)	18,437	48.68
Write-in		46	0.12
Total votes		37,877	100.00%
Democratic gain from Republican			

=== 2000 ===
2000 Washington State House of Representatives, District 44 General Election results
Party	Candidate	Votes	%
Democratic	John Lovick (incumbent)	28,345	54.14
Republican	Irene Endicott	22,472	42.93
Libertarian	Jesse Brocksmith	1,492	2.85
Write-in		42	0.08
Total votes		52,351	100.00%
Democratic hold			

=== 2002 ===
2002 Washington State House of Representatives, District 44 General Election results
Party	Candidate	Votes	%
Democratic	John Lovick (incumbent)	18,424	52.32
Republican	Randy Nichols	16,736	47.53
Write-in		55	0.16
Total votes		35,215	100.00%
Democratic hold			

=== 2004 ===
2004 Washington State House of Representatives, District 44 General Election results
Party	Candidate	Votes	%
Democratic	John Lovick (incumbent)	34,903	58.74
Republican	Stephen E. West	24,444	41.14
Write-in		71	0.12
Total votes		59,418	100.00%
Democratic hold			

=== 2006 ===
2006 Washington State House of Representatives, District 44 General Election results
Party	Candidate	Votes	%
Democratic	John Lovick (incumbent)	26,703	58.95
Republican	Robert Legg	18,549	40.95
Write-in		48	0.11
Total votes		45,300	100.00%
Democratic hold			

=== 2015 ===
2015 Snohomish County Executive Primary Election results
Party	Candidate	Votes	%
Democratic	Dave Somers	31,283	32.88
Democratic	John Lovick (incumbent)	30,120	31.66
Republican	Robert Sutherland	25,033	26.31
Independent	James Robert Deal	5,148	5.41
Republican	Norm Nunnally	2,704	2.84
Write-in		860	0.90
Total votes		95,148	100.00%

2015 Snohomish County Executive General Election results
Party	Candidate	Votes	%
Democratic	Dave Somers	74,492	56.18
Democratic	John Lovick (incumbent)	56,428	42.56
Write-in		1,670	1.26
Total votes		132,590	100.00%
Democratic hold			

=== 2016 ===
2016 Washington State House of Representatives, District 44 General Election results
Party	Candidate	Votes	%
Democratic	John Lovick (incumbent)	36,836	51.92
Republican	Janice Huxford	34,026	40.95
Write-in		90	0.13
Total votes		70,952	100.00%
Democratic hold			

=== 2018 ===
2018 Washington State House of Representatives, District 44 General Election results
Party	Candidate	Votes	%
Democratic	John Lovick (incumbent)	38,194	56.97
Republican	Jeff Sax	28,742	42.87
Write-in		109	0.16
Total votes		67,045	100.00%
Democratic hold			

=== 2020 ===
2020 Washington State House of Representatives, District 44 General Election results
Party	Candidate	Votes	%
Democratic	John Lovick (incumbent)	50,729	57.15
Republican	John T. Kartak	37,962	42.77
Write-in		68	0.08
Total votes		88,759	100.00%
Democratic hold			

=== 2022 ===
2022 Washington State Senate, District 44 General Election results
Party	Candidate	Votes	%
Democratic	John Lovick (incumbent)	37,226	58.77
Republican	Jeb Brewer	26,062	41.14
Write-in		59	0.09
Total votes		63,347	100.00%
Democratic hold			

Washington House of Representatives
Preceded by Tina Orwall	Speaker pro tempore of the Washington House of Representatives; 2018–2021	Succeeded by Tina Orwall
Political offices
Preceded by Frank Chopp	Speaker of the Washington House of Representatives; Acting; May 9, 2019 – January 13, 2020	Succeeded by Laurie Jinkins
