= Willis Tucker =

American politician and newspaper editor

1st Snohomish County Executive
- In office May 1, 1980 – January 2, 1992
- Preceded by: Office established
- Succeeded by: Bob Drewel

Personal details
- Born: November 13, 1922 Beards Fork, West Virginia, U.S.
- Died: June 30, 2000 (aged 77) Snohomish, Washington, U.S.
- Party: Democratic
- Spouse: Annette Rhoades Tucker
- Children: 3
- Occupation: Newspaper editor

Military service
- Allegiance: United States
- Branch/service: United States Army
- Years of service: 1943–1946
- Rank: Technical sergeant
- Unit: Military Police Corps
- Battles/wars: World War II

Willis D. Tucker (November 13, 1922 – June 30, 2000) was an American politician and newspaper editor from Washington state. Tucker was the longtime editor of the Western Sun in southern Snohomish County from 1965 to 1980. He was elected as the first Snohomish County Executive in 1980 and served three terms in the office before retiring in 1991.

== Early life and military service ==
Tucker was born on November 13, 1922, to a coal mining family in Beards Fork, West Virginia. At the age of 14, he was sent to live with his grandparents in Coulee City, Washington, where he graduated high school. Playing as a quarterback for the Coulee City High School football team, Tucker earned himself a scholarship to attend Gonzaga University shortly after graduating.

Tucker abandoned the Gonzaga scholarship and enlisted in the United States Army in 1943, during the middle of World War II, and was sent to Fort Custer to become a member of the Military Police Corps. He served under former FBI agent Melvin Purvis in Europe, investigating crimes involving American soldiers, before mustering out as technical sergeant. After returning to Coulee City in 1946, he married Annette Rhoades and worked as a concrete pourer on the Grand Coulee Dam before being poisoned by the work, entering the newspaper business instead.

== Newspaper career ==
Tucker entered the newspaper business as a print shop worker in Coulee City and Portland, Oregon, before moving to Snohomish in 1949. Tucker became the co-owner of the Snohomish Tribune and served on the city's chamber of commerce for several years, before selling his share and joining The Everett Herald. In 1965, he was named the managing editor of The Herald's Western Sun edition, covering southern Snohomish County. He continued to be involved in community politics, later joining the Mountlake Terrace chamber of commerce and the Lynnwood Koffee Klatch, a group of southern Snohomish County business leaders. Tucker was one of the founding members of the Association of Washington Generals, along with Lieutenant Governor John Cherberg.

== County executive ==
After the approval of a new home rule charter for Snohomish County in 1979, creating the new position of Snohomish County Executive, Tucker was encouraged to run for public office by future Everett mayor Ed Hansen. Deciding to run as a Democrat, despite having conservative leanings, Tucker faced Republican state senator Gary A. Nelson and two independent candidates. While Tucker had no political experience, he had been a member of the County Airport Commission and touted his longtime involvement with local political issues while working at the Western Sun. In his campaign, Tucker focused on making a smooth transition to the new form of county government, while also saving the county's rural qualities in the face of growing suburbanization. During the March 11, 1980 general election, Tucker defeated Nelson to become the county's first executive.

Tucker selected former Everett councilman Gordon Hay as his first deputy executive and took office on May 1. During his first year in office, the county faced a $6 million revenue shortfall that Tucker's administration solved with program and staff cuts. Tucker was re-elected to a second term in 1983, beating out Everett businessman Court Sheehan in the Democratic primary and Republican Snohomish city councilman Larry E. Countryman.

During his second term, Tucker's administration supported the selection of Everett as the site of a new naval base. Another budget crisis forced more staff layoffs and program cuts to save $6.8 million by 1987. Tucker's popularity began to decline during his second term, leading to a near-upset by architect Michael Glanz in the 1987 election. Tucker won a third term by a margin of 1,500 votes, which was as low as 500 on election night, and called the vote an "anti-Tucker" campaign. Tucker remained personally popular, but declined to run for a fourth term in 1991 and was succeeded by Bob Drewel.

By the time he retired in 1991, Tucker had successfully established senior-friendly policies to aid the elderly and senior centers, and also moved forward with county purchasing of wetlands in the Snohomish River delta for preservation. While socially liberal, Tucker was an ardent fiscal conservative, and emphasized strict spending and budgeting as well as other policies favoring job growth.

=== Electoral history ===
Snohomish County Executive election results, 1980–1987
Year	Candidate	Party	Votes	Pct	Candidate	Party	Votes	Pct	Candidate	Party	Votes	Pct
1980	Willis Tucker	Democratic	13,085	48.74%	Gary A. Nelson	Republican	11,852	44.15%	Louise A. Saluteen	Independent	1,910	7.11%
1983	Willis Tucker	Democratic	54,756	58.28%	Larry E. Countryman	Republican	39,194	31.72%				
1987	Willis Tucker	Democratic	35,222	51.04%	Michael Glanz	Republican	33,782	48.96%				

== Personal life ==
Tucker was an avid golfer and spent time on local courses. During the 1990 GTE Northwest Classic, part of the 1990 Senior PGA Tour, Tucker was one of two amateur golfers to make a hole-in-one, earning lifetime dinners at Duke's Chowder House in Seattle.

=== Death and legacy ===
Tucker died at his Snohomish home on June 30, 2000, at the age of 77, after a four-year battle with prostate cancer.

The county dedicated Willis D. Tucker Regional County Park near Silver Firs in May 2000, one month before Tucker's death.
