= Aaron Reardon (politician) =

American politician and lobbyist from Washington

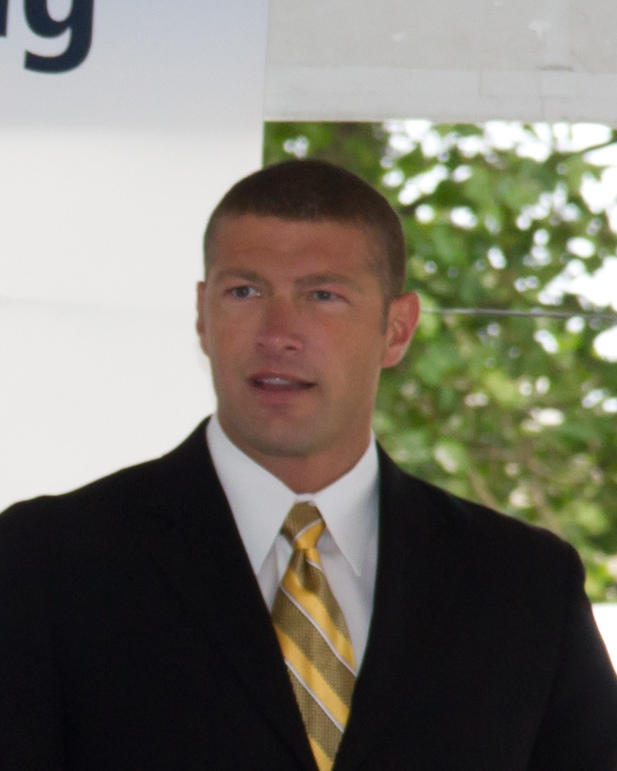

3rd Snohomish County Executive
- In office January 5, 2004 – May 31, 2013
- Preceded by: Bob Drewel
- Succeeded by: John Lovick

Member of the Washington Senate from the 38th district
- In office January 13, 2003 – December 31, 2003
- Preceded by: Jeralita "Jeri" Costa
- Succeeded by: Jean Berkey

Member of the Washington House of Representatives from the 38th district
- In office January 11, 1999 – January 13, 2003
- Preceded by: Jeralita “Jeri” Costa
- Succeeded by: John McCoy

Personal details
- Party: Democratic
- Spouse: Kate Reardon
- Children: 2
- Education: Central Washington University (BA)

Aaron G. Reardon is an American politician and lobbyist who served as the Snohomish County Executive from 2004 to 2013. First elected to the post in 2003, Reardon was sworn in as the youngest county executive in the United States. On February 21, 2013, Reardon announced his resignation effective May 31, 2013.

Prior to serving as Snohomish county executive, Reardon served as a Washington State Senator and a member of the state House of Representatives.

== Education ==
Reardon attended Mariner High School in Everett, Washington and lettered in football and swimming. His interest in competitive swimming led him to attend Central Washington University, but his swim career ended two months after his arrival. He earned dual Bachelor of Arts degrees in economics and public administration. During college, he volunteered on multiple statewide and local Democratic campaigns.

== Career ==
After graduating from college, Reardon was selected for a post-graduate position with the Downtown Seattle Association, where he lobbied on behalf of Seattle businesses.

In 1998, aged 27, Reardon sought election to the Washington House of Representatives. He won the general election with more than 55% of the vote.

Reardon was easily re-elected in 2000 and vacated the seat in 2002 to run for the Washington State Senate. In 2002, he won election to the 38th Legislative District Senate seat, garnering 65 percent of the vote.

In 2003, Reardon won a three-way Democratic Primary election for the Snohomish County executive position. In the primary election, he defeated former Democratic state senator Kevin Quigley. Reardon won the November general election garnering 52 percent of the countywide vote. Reardon positioned himself as a centrist Democrat, campaigning on a platform that called for decreasing taxes while implementing a long-term strategic growth plan specific to Snohomish County.

In 2007, Reardon retained his seat as County Executive defeating Republican Jack Turk. Reardon received 65 percent of the popular vote. In 2011, he won a third term as county executive, defeating Republican Mike Hope, a Seattle police officer and member of the Washington State Legislature. In August 2012, a Skagit County judge dismissed a petition by a local blogger to recall Reardon because it had not been sworn in under oath.

On February 21, 2013, Reardon announced his resignation as county executive effective May 31, 2013. He cited the ongoing financial toll on him and his family, regarding legal costs to continue to successfully defend against political allegations of improper use of county resources in his re-election campaign and an extra-marital affair.

== Personal life ==
Reardon and his wife Kate live in Everett, Washington, with their two children.
