= Washington's 39th legislative district =

Coordinates: 48°11′N 121°35′W

Map of Washington's 39th legislative district

Washington's 39th legislative district is one of forty-nine districts in Washington state for representation in the state legislature. The rural district contains most of Snohomish and Skagit counties (but not their major cities).

This district's legislators are state senator Keith Wagoner and state representatives Sam Low (position 1) and Carolyn Eslick (position 2), all Republicans.

== See also ==
- Washington Redistricting Commission
- Washington State Legislature
- Washington State Senate
- Washington House of Representatives
- Washington (state) legislative districts
