= Snohomish County Council =

Legislative body of Snohomish County, Washington, US

- Snohomish County, Washington

Type
- Type: County council

Leadership
- President: Megan Dunn (D)
- Vice President: Sam Low (R)

Structure
- Seats: 5
- Political groups: Democratic Party (3); Republican Party (2)
- Length of term: 4 years

Elections
- Last election: November 7, 2023

Meeting place
- Henry M. Jackson Boardroom; Robert J. Drewel Building; Everett, Washington

Website
- Snohomish County Council

The Snohomish County Council is the legislative body of Snohomish County, Washington. The county council was created in 1979 and consists of five members serving four-year terms.

== Members ==
As of January 2025

District	Councilmember	Party	Took office
1	Nate Nehring	Republican	January 23, 2017 (Note: Appointed to complete the term of Ken Klein after his resignation.)
2	Megan Dunn (President)	Democratic	January 1, 2020
3	Strom Peterson (Note: Also a member of the Washington State House of Representatives.)	Democratic	September 29, 2022 (Note: Appointed to complete the term of Stephanie Wright after her resignation.)
4	Jared Mead	Democratic	April 8, 2020
5	Sam Low (Vice President)	Republican	November 29, 2016

== History ==
The county council was created on November 6, 1979, by Snohomish County voters as part of a home rule charter, which replaced the traditional three-member county commission with a five-member council and county executive. The first two new councilmembers was elected on March 11, 1980, joining the three existing commissioners who would continue to serve until 1983, when all seats were up for re-election.

In 2016, the county's Charter Review Commission explored expanding the council to seven members after the next redistricting. The expansion, along with requirements to hold some meetings outside of Everett and include evening meetings for public hearings, were rejected by the commission. The meetings proposal was placed on the November 2016, where it was approved by voters and came into effect the following year, requiring the county council to host at least one evening meeting in each district per year.

== Structure ==
The council consists of five members representing five geographic districts of equal population. Each member serves a four-year term during a regular election held during November on odd-numbered years. No member can serve more than three total terms.

Candidates for a council seat must be 21 years old at the time of the election, have lived in Snohomish County for 3 years prior to filing, and be a registered voter in their district.

=== Districts ===
- District 1: Arlington, Darrington, Granite Falls, Marysville, Stanwood
- District 2: Everett, Mukilteo, Tulalip Indian Reservation
- District 3: Edmonds, Lynnwood (partial), Woodway
- District 4: Bothell (partial), Brier, Lynnwood (partial), Mill Creek, Mountlake Terrace
- District 5: Index, Lake Stevens, Monroe, Snohomish, Sultan

Districts are redrawn every ten years by an independent Districting Committee using United States Census data.

== See also ==
- King County Council
