= 2026 Washington House of Representatives election =

2026 Washington House of Representatives elections
- November 3, 2026

All 98 seats in the Washington House of Representatives 50 seats needed for a majority
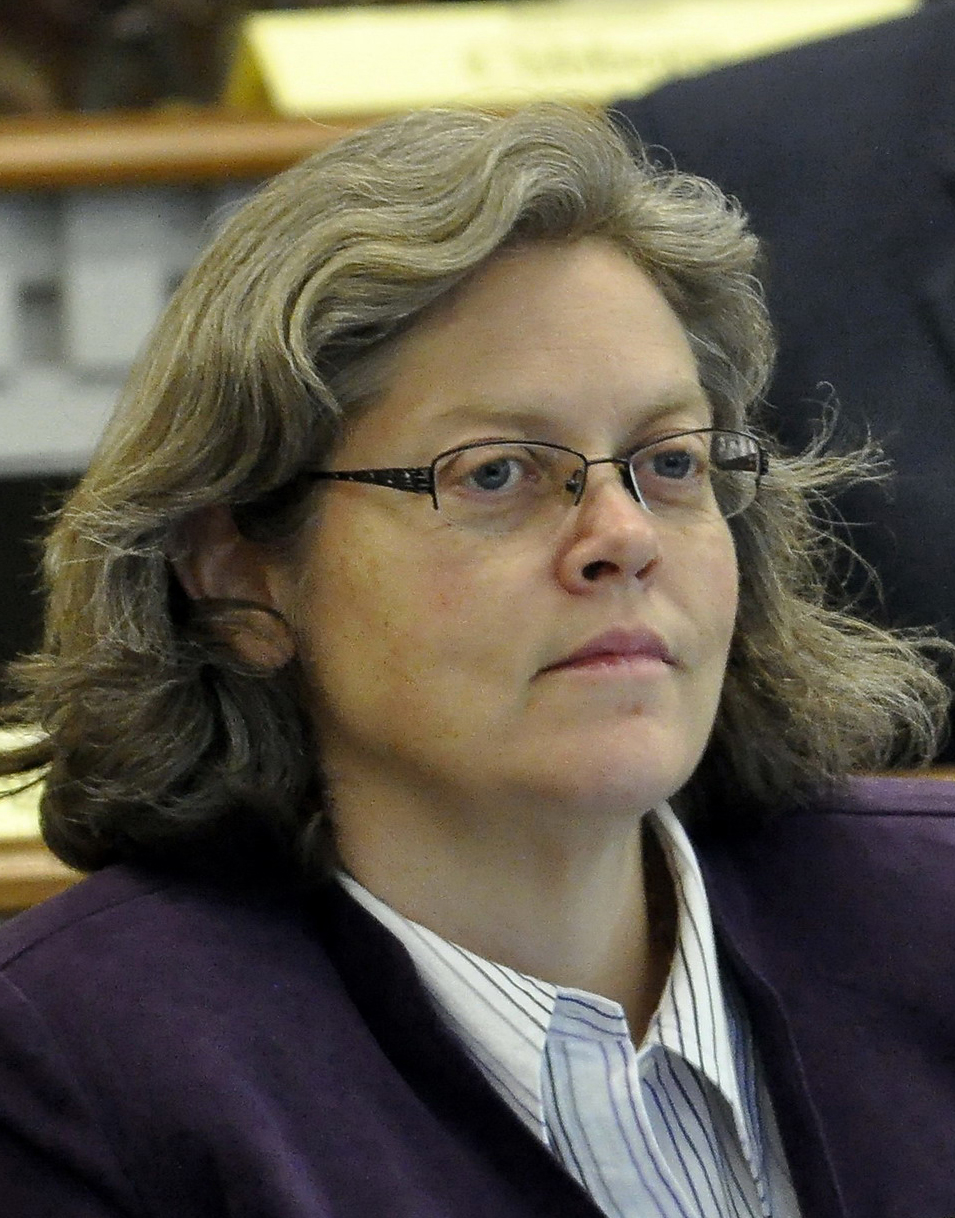

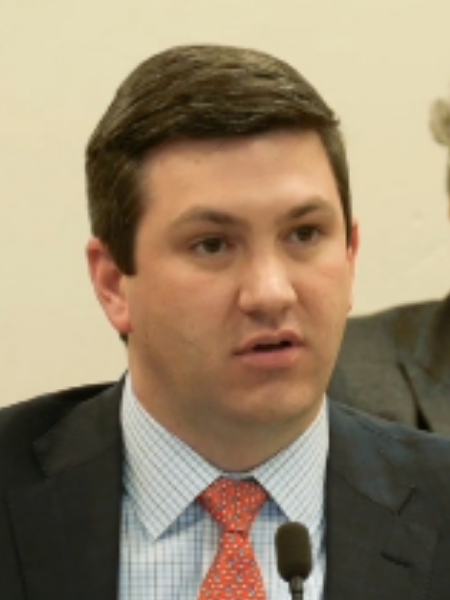
	Majority party	Minority party
Leader	Laurie Jinkins	Drew Stokesbary
Party	Democratic	Republican
Leader's seat	27th–Tacoma	31st–Auburn
Seats before	59	39
Seats won	69	29
Seat change	▲10	▼10
- Democratic incumbent Democratic incumbent retiring Republican incumbent Republican incumbent retiring
Speaker of the House before election
Laurie Jinkins
Democratic
Elected Speaker of the House
TBD

The 2026 Washington House of Representatives election was held on November 3, 2026, alongside the other 2026 United States elections. Voters elected two members of the Washington House of Representatives in all 49 of the U.S. state of Washington's legislative districts to serve a two-year term.

Elections were held concurrently with the 2026 US midterm election, as well as elections to the US House of Representatives, Washington State Senate, Washington Supreme Court, and various county and local offices. Primary elections were held on August 4, 2026 using a top-two primary where all candidates are listed on the same ballot and the two candidates with the most votes advance to the general election.

Democrats won their first supermajority in the Washington House since 1948.

== Partisan background ==
Going into the 2026 election, only the 26th District has members of the House who are from different parties. An additional two districts have a State Senator whose political party is different than both members of the House from that district. The 10th District has two Democratic members of the State House with a Republican State Senator while the 18th District has two Republican members of the State House with a Democratic State Senator.

Republicans hold both house seats in 6 legislative districts which Kamala Harris won in 2024: District 12 (Harris +1), District 14 (Harris +0.5), District 17 (Harris +4), District 18 (Harris +1), District 25 (Harris +0.5), and District 35 (Harris +0.5). Republicans hold one of two house seats in one District which Kamala Harris won in 2024: District 26 (Harris +5).

Harris 40–50% 50–60% 60–70% 70–80% 80–90% 90–100% / Trump 40–50% 50–60% 60–70%

On December 10th, 2025, the Democratic Legislative Campaign Committee (DLCC) announced that attaining a supermajority in the Washington House of Representatives was one of their targets for 2026. A supermajority of 66 seats would require Democrats to net gain 7 seats in 2026. Republicans currently control 13 seats in the State House that Kamala Harris won in 2024 which would be the most likely targets for Democrats to attempt to flip.

On April 16th, 2026, the Republican State Leadership Committee (RSLC) announced that they would be investing in Washington state legislative races to protect incumbents and flip seats. They did not announce investments in any specific races at that time.

On September 9th, 2026, the DLCC announced 10 races they would be targeting in the Washington House of Representatives including 3 seats held by Democrats and 7 seats held by Republicans. The 3 candidates they are targeting in districts held by Democrats are Clyde Shavers in District 10, Adison Richards in District 26, and Joe Timmons in District 42. The 7 candidates they are targeting in districts held by Republicans include Stacy Willoughby in District 12, Ezequiel Morfín in District 14, Ben Christly and Diana Perez in District 17, Randi Knott and Deken Letinich in District 18, and Renee Hernandez Greenfield in District 26.

== Retirements ==
=== Democrats ===
- District 3, Position 2: Timm Ormsby is retiring.
- District 24, Position 2: Steve Tharinger is retiring.
- District 29, Position 2: Sharlett Mena is retiring to run for State Senate.
- District 32, Position 1: Cindy Ryu is retiring to run for State Senate.
- District 37, Position 2: Chipalo Street is retiring to run for State Senate.
- District 45, Position 2: Larry Springer is retiring
- District 49, Position 1: Sharon Wylie is retiring to run for Clark County Auditor.

=== Republicans ===
- District 4, Position 1: Suzanne Schmidt is retiring to run for Spokane County Commission.
- District 6, Position 1: Mike Volz is retiring.
- District 6, Position 2: Jenny Graham is retiring.
- District 13, Position 2: Alex Ybarra is retiring to run for State Senate.
- District 15, Position 2: Jeremie Dufault is retiring to run for State Senate.
- District 26, Position 2: Michelle Caldier Valdez is retiring.
- District 39, Position 2: Carolyn Eslick is retiring.

== Predictions ==
Source	Ranking	As of
Sabato's Crystal Ball	Safe D	January 22, 2026

== Summary of results by district ==
District	2024 Pres.	Posi	Incumbent	Party	Elected Representative	Outcome
1st	D+44.4	1	Davina Duerr	Dem	TBD	
1st	D+44.4	2	Shelley Kloba	Dem	TBD	
2nd	R+14.8	1	Andrew Barkis	Rep	TBD	
2nd	R+14.8	2	Matt Marshall	Rep	TBD	
3rd	D+23.8	1	Natasha Hill	Dem	TBD	
3rd	D+23.8	2	Timm Ormsby†	Dem	TBD	
4th	R+18.8	1	Suzanne Schmidt†	Rep	TBD	
4th	R+18.8	2	Rob Chase	Rep	TBD	
5th	D+18.9	1	Zach Hall	Dem	TBD	
5th	D+18.9	2	Lisa Callan	Dem	TBD	
6th	R+11.0	1	Mike Volz†	Rep	TBD	
6th	R+11.0	2	Jenny Graham†	Rep	TBD	
7th	R+31.9	1	Andrew Engell	Rep	TBD	
7th	R+31.9	2	Hunter Abell	Rep	TBD	
8th	R+23.7	1	Stephanie Barnard	Rep	TBD	
8th	R+23.7	2	April Connors	Rep	TBD	
9th	R+16.1	1	Mary Dye	Rep	TBD	
9th	R+16.1	2	Joe Schmick	Rep	TBD	
10th	D+8.6	1	Clyde Shavers	Dem	TBD	
10th	D+8.6	2	Dave Paul	Dem	TBD	
11th	D+36.9	1	David Hackney	Dem	TBD	
11th	D+36.9	2	Steve Bergquist	Dem	TBD	
12th	D+2.0	1	Brian Burnett	Rep	TBD	
12th	D+2.0	2	Mike Steele	Rep	TBD	
13th	R+28.0	1	Tom Dent	Rep	TBD	
13th	R+28.0	2	Alex Ybarra†	Rep	TBD	
14th	D+1.1	1	Gloria Mendoza	Rep	TBD	
14th	D+1.1	2	Deb Manjarrez	Rep	TBD	
15th	R+23.4	1	Chris Corry	Rep	TBD	
15th	R+23.4	2	Jeremie Dufault†	Rep	TBD	
16th	R+15.5	1	Mark Klicker	Rep	TBD	
16th	R+15.5	2	Skyler Rude	Rep	TBD	
17th	D+8.4	1	Kevin Waters	Rep	TBD	
17th	D+8.4	2	David Stuebe	Rep	TBD	
18th	D+2.3	1	Stephanie McClintock	Rep	TBD	
18th	D+2.3	2	John Ley	Rep	TBD	
19th	R+15.2	1	Jim Walsh	Rep	TBD	
19th	R+15.2	2	Joel McEntire	Rep	TBD	
20th	R+27.0	1	Peter Abbarno	Rep	TBD	
20th	R+27.0	2	Ed Orcutt	Rep	TBD	
21st	D+36.5	1	Strom Peterson	Dem	TBD	
21st	D+36.5	2	Lillian Ortiz-Self	Dem	TBD	
22nd	D+38.2	1	Beth Doglio	Dem	TBD	
22nd	D+38.2	2	Lisa Parshley	Dem	TBD	
23rd	D+32.5	1	Tarra Simmons	Dem	TBD	
23rd	D+32.5	2	Greg Nance	Dem	TBD	
24th	D+13.9	1	Adam Bernbaum	Dem	TBD	
24th	D+13.9	2	Steve Tharinger†	Dem	TBD	
25th	D+1.3	1	Michael Keaton	Rep	TBD	
25th	D+1.3	2	Cyndy Jacobsen	Rep	TBD	
26th	D+9.4	1	Adison Richards	Dem	TBD	
26th	D+9.4	2	Michelle Caldier Valdez†	Rep	TBD	
27th	D+43.8	1	Laurie Jinkins	Dem	TBD	
27th	D+43.8	2	Jake Fey	Dem	TBD	
28th	D+20.8	1	Mari Leavitt	Dem	TBD	
28th	D+20.8	2	Dan Bronoske	Dem	TBD	
29th	D+20.6	1	Melanie Morgan	Dem	TBD	
29th	D+20.6	2	Sharlett Mena†	Dem	TBD	
30th	D+19.8	1	Jamila Taylor	Dem	TBD	
30th	D+19.8	2	Kristine Reeves	Dem	TBD	
31st	R+7.0	1	Drew Stokesbary	Rep	TBD	
31st	R+7.0	2	Josh Penner	Rep	TBD	
32nd	D+53.0	1	Cindy Ryu†	Dem	TBD	
32nd	D+53.0	2	Lauren Davis	Dem	TBD	
33rd	D+36.1	1	Edwin Obras	Dem	TBD	
33rd	D+36.1	2	Mia Gregerson	Dem	TBD	
34th	D+69.6	1	Brianna Thomas	Dem	TBD	
34th	D+69.6	2	Joe Fitzgibbon	Dem	TBD	
35th	D+0.6	1	Dan Griffey	Rep	TBD	
35th	D+0.6	2	Travis Couture	Rep	TBD	
36th	D+80.9	1	Julia Reed	Dem	TBD	
36th	D+80.9	2	Liz Berry	Dem	TBD	
37th	D+73.3	1	Sharon Tomiko Santos	Dem	TBD	
37th	D+73.3	2	Chipalo Street†	Dem	TBD	
38th	D+19.1	1	Julio Cortes	Dem	TBD	
38th	D+19.1	2	Mary Fosse	Dem	TBD	
39th	R+7.6	1	Sam Low	Rep	TBD	
39th	R+7.6	2	Carolyn Eslick†	Rep	TBD	
40th	D+40.6	1	Debra Lekanoff	Dem	TBD	
40th	D+40.6	2	Alex Ramel	Dem	TBD	
41st	D+44.6	1	Janice Zahn	Dem	TBD	
41st	D+44.6	2	My-Linh Thai	Dem	TBD	
42nd	D+9.8	1	Alicia Rule	Dem	TBD	
42nd	D+9.8	2	Joe Timmons	Dem	TBD	
43rd	D+81.3	1	Nicole Macri	Dem	TBD	
43rd	D+81.3	2	Shaun Scott	Dem	TBD	
44th	D+20.7	1	Brandy Donaghy	Dem	TBD	
44th	D+20.7	2	April Berg	Dem	TBD	
45th	D+44.0	1	Roger Goodman	Dem	TBD	
45th	D+44.0	2	Larry Springer†	Dem	TBD	
46th	D+78.2	1	Gerry Pollet	Dem	TBD	
46th	D+78.2	2	Darya Farivar	Dem	TBD	
47th	D+15.1	1	Debra Entenman	Dem	TBD	
47th	D+15.1	2	Chris Stearns	Dem	TBD	
48th	D+44.9	1	Osman Salahuddin	Dem	TBD	
48th	D+44.9	2	Amy Walen	Dem	TBD	
49th	D+24.5	1	Sharon Wylie†	Dem	TBD	
49th	D+24.5	2	Monica Stonier	Dem	TBD	

== District 1 ==
=== Position 1 ===
==== Candidates ====
===== Advanced to general =====
- Davina Duerr (Democratic), incumbent state representative
- Maggie Wang (Republican)

==== Endorsements ====
Davina Duerr (D)

Newspapers

- The Stranger
- The Urbanist

==== Results ====
Washington's 1st State House District Position 1, 2026
Primary election
Party	Candidate	Votes	%
Democratic	Davina Duerr (incumbent)	29,426	74.7
Republican	Maggie Wang	9,878	25.1
Write-in		70	0.2
Total votes		39,347	100.0
General election
Democratic	Davina Duerr (incumbent)		
Republican	Maggie Wang		
Write-in			
Total votes			100.0

=== Position 2 ===
==== Candidates ====
===== Advanced to general =====
- Shelley Kloba (Democratic), incumbent state representative
- Cliff Moon (Republican)

===== Eliminated in primary =====
- Jenne Alderks (Democratic)
- Jeff Lyon (Libertarian)

==== Endorsements ====
Jenne Alderks (D)

Newspapers

- The Urbanist
Shelley Kloba (D)

Local officials

- Nigel Herbig, mayor of Kenmore and Kenmore City Council member

Newspapers

- The Stranger

==== Results ====
Washington's 1st State House District Position 2, 2026
Primary election
Party	Candidate	Votes	%
Democratic	Shelley Kloba (incumbent)	19,150	48.5
Republican	Cliff Moon	9,110	23.1
Democratic	Jenne Alderks	8,974	22.7
Libertarian	Jeff Lyon	2,190	5.6
Write-in		33	0.1
Total votes		39,457	100.0
General election
Democratic	Shelley Kloba (incumbent)		
Republican	Cliff Moon		
Write-in			
Total votes			100.0

== District 2 ==
=== Position 1 ===
==== Candidates ====
===== Advanced to general =====
- Andrew Barkis (Republican), incumbent state representative
- William Dehnel (Labor Democrat (Note: Not an actual political party. In Washington, independent candidates are allowed to choose a ballot label.))

==== Results ====
Washington's 2nd State House District Position 1, 2026
Primary election
Party	Candidate	Votes	%
Republican	Andrew Barkis (incumbent)	18,389	58.1
Labor Democrat	William Dehnel	13,214	41.7
Write-in		60	0.2
Total votes		31,660	100.0
General election
Republican	Andrew Barkis (incumbent)		
Labor Democrat	William Dehnel		
Write-in			
Total votes			100.0

=== Position 2 ===
==== Candidates ====
===== Advanced to general =====
- Matt Marshall (Republican), incumbent state representative
- Angela Taylor (Democratic)

===== Eliminated in primary =====
- Martin Miller (Democratic)

==== Results ====
Washington's 2nd State House District Position 2, 2026
Primary election
Party	Candidate	Votes	%
Republican	Matt Marshall (incumbent)	18,504	56.9
Democratic	Angela Taylor	10,650	33.6
Democratic	Martin Miller	2,986	9.4
Write-in		42	0.1
Total votes		31,732	100.0
General election
Republican	Matt Marshall (incumbent)		
Democratic	Angela Taylor		
Write-in			
Total votes			100.0

== District 3 ==
=== Position 1 ===
==== Candidates ====
===== Advanced to general =====
- Natasha Hill (Democratic), incumbent state representative
- Tony Kiepe (Republican), businessman and candidate for this district in 2024

===== Eliminated in primary =====
- John Kness (Independent), automotive repair regional district manager

==== Endorsements ====
Natasha Hill (D)

Organizations

- Fuse Washington
- Washington Working Families Party

==== Results ====
Washington's 3rd State House District Position 1, 2026
Primary election
Party	Candidate	Votes	%
Democratic	Natasha Hill (incumbent)	27,075	64.4
Republican	Tony Kiepe	12,705	30.2
No party preference	John Kness	2,197	5.2
Write-in		83	0.2
Total votes		42,060	100.0
General election
Democratic	Natasha Hill (incumbent)		
Republican	Tony Kiepe		
Write-in			
Total votes			100.0

=== Position 2 ===
The incumbent is Democrat Timm Ormsby who is retiring.

==== Candidates ====
===== Advanced to primary =====
- Luc Jasmin III (Democratic), regional outreach representative
- Natalie Poulson (Republican), teacher and candidate for this seat in 2022

===== Eliminated in primary =====
- Pam Kohlmeier (Democratic), emergency room doctor and candidate for the 9th district in 2024
- Donovan DeLeon (Democratic), paratransit operator

===== Declined =====
- Timm Ormsby (Democratic), incumbent state representative

==== Endorsements ====
Luc Jasmin III (D)

Statewide officials

- Bob Ferguson, governor of Washington (2025–present)
- Jay Inslee, former governor of Washington (2013–2025)

State legislators

- Andy Billig, former Senate majority leader (2019–2025) from the 3rd district (2013–2025)
- Natasha Hill, state representative from the 3rd district (2025–present)
- Marcus Riccelli, state senator from the 3rd district (2025–present)

Local officials

- Lisa Brown, mayor of Spokane (2024–present)
- 6 Spokane City Council members (Note: Paul Dillon, Spokane City Council member from the 2nd district (2024–present); Sarah Dixit, Spokane City Council member from the 1st district (2026–present); Kitty Klitzke, Spokane City Council member from the 3rd district (2024–present); Kate Telis, Spokane City Council member from the 2nd district (2025–present); Betsy Wilkerson, Spokane City Council president (2020–present); Zack Zappone, Spokane City Council member from the 3rd district (2022–present))

==== Results ====
Washington's 3rd State House District Position 2, 2026
Primary election
Party	Candidate	Votes	%
Republican	Natalie Poulson	13,790	32.9
Democratic	Luc Jasmin III	13,581	32.4
Democratic	Pam Kohlmeier	12,662	30.2
Democratic	Donovan DeLeon	1,850	4.4
Write-in		43	0.1
Total votes		41,926	100.0
General election
Republican	Natalie Poulson		
Democratic	Luc Jasmin III		
Write-in			
Total votes			100.0

== District 4 ==
=== Position 1 ===
The incumbent is Republican Suzanne Schmidt who is retiring to run for Spokane County Commission.

==== Candidates ====
===== Advanced to general =====
- Trent Maier (Republican), businessman
- Hillary Pham (Republican), Air Force veteran and former intergovernmental affairs officer

===== Eliminated in primary =====
- Debra L. Long (Republican), Central Valley School District board member and former vice chair of the Spokane County Republican Party
- George Wagner (Republican), Navy veteran and former legislative aid to State Representative Jenny Graham

===== Declined =====
- Suzanne Schmidt (Republican), incumbent state representative (running for Spokane County Commission)

==== Endorsements ====
George Wagner (R)

State legislators

- Mike Padden, former state senator for the 4th district (2023–present)
- Suzanne Schmidt, state representative for the 4th district (2023–present)

Political parties

- Spokane County Republican Party
Hillary Pham (R)

State legislators

- Rob Chase, state representative from the 4th district (2021–2023; 2025–present)

==== Results ====
Washington's 4th State House District Position 1, 2026
Primary election
Party	Candidate	Votes	%
Republican	Hillary Pham	11,278	31.5
Republican	Trent Maier	10,583	29.6
Republican	Debra L. Long	6,498	18.2
Republican	George Wagner	6,002	16.8
Write-in		1,419	4.0
Total votes		35,780	100.0
General election
Republican	Hillary Pham		
Republican	Trent Maier		
Write-in			
Total votes			100.0

=== Position 2 ===
==== Candidates ====
===== Advanced to general =====
- Rob Chase (Republican), incumbent state representative
- Rob Tupper (Democratic), former teacher

===== Eliminated in primary =====
- Bob Curtis (Republican), former transportation security inspector

==== Results ====
Washington's 4th State House District Position 2, 2026
Primary election
Party	Candidate	Votes	%
Republican	Rob Chase (incumbent)	17,757	42.9
Democratic	Rob Tupper	16,778	40.5
Republican	Bob Curtis	6,731	16.3
Write-in		139	0.3
Total votes		41,405	100.0
General election
Republican	Rob Chase (incumbent)		
Democratic	Rob Tupper		
Write-in			
Total votes			100.0

== District 5 ==
=== Position 1 ===
==== Candidates ====
===== Advanced to general =====
- Michelle Bennett (Republican), chief of police of Mercer Island
- Zach Hall (Democratic), incumbent state representative

===== Eliminated in primary =====
- Topher Leritz (Independent), private investigator
- Aimee Warmerdam (Democratic)

==== Endorsements ====
Michelle Bennett (R)

Statewide officials

- Sam Reed, former secretary of state of Washington (2001–2013)

State legislators

- Chad Magendanz, former state representative from the 5th district (2013–2017)
- Brian Thomas, former state representative from the 5th district (1993–2000)

Local officials

- Reagan Dunn, King County Council member from the 9th district (2005–present)
- Jan Molinaro, former mayor of Enumclaw
- Anthony Wright, mayor of Enumclaw

Political parties

- King County Republican Party

Organizations

- Mainstream Republicans of Washington
- National Federation of Independent Businesses

Newspapers

- The Urbanist
Zach Hall (D)

U.S. representatives

- Kim Schrier, WA-8 (2019–present)

State legislators

- Lisa Callan, state representative from the 5th district (2019–present)
- Victoria Hunt, state senator from the 5th district (2025–present)

Organizations

- Washington Education Association
Declined to endorse

Newspapers

- The Seattle Times

==== Results ====
Washington's 5th State House District Position 1, 2026
Primary election
Party	Candidate	Votes	%
Democratic	Zach Hall (incumbent)	18,294	44.5
Republican	Michelle Bennett	17,681	43.0
Democratic	Aimee Warmerdam	3,994	9.7
No party preference	Topher Lertiz	1,083	2.6
Write-in		32	0.1
Total votes		41,052	100.0
General election
Democratic	Zach Hall (incumbent)		
Republican	Michelle Bennett		
Write-in			
Total votes			100.0

=== Position 2 ===
==== Candidates ====
===== Advanced to general =====
- Lisa Callan (Democratic), incumbent state representative
- Patrick Peacock (Republican), candidate for this district in 2024

==== Endorsements ====
Lisa Callan (D)

U.S. representatives

- Kim Schrier, WA-8 (2019–present)

Organizations

- Planned Parenthood
- Sierra Club
Patrick Peacock (R)

Political parties

- King County Republican Party

Organizations

- 5th Legislative District Republicans

==== Results ====
Washington's 5th State House District Position 2, 2026
Primary election
Party	Candidate	Votes	%
Democratic	Lisa Callan (incumbent)	23,812	57.7
Republican	Patrick Peacock	17,449	42.3
Write-in		39	0.1
Total votes		41,300	100.0
General election
Democratic	Lisa Callan (incumbent)		
Republican	Patrick Peacock		
Write-in			
Total votes			100.0

== District 6 ==
=== Position 1 ===
The incumbent is Republican Mike Volz who is retiring to focus on his other position as Spokane County Treasurer.

==== Candidates ====
===== Advanced to general =====
- Michaela Kelso (Democratic), executive board representative for the Spokane County Democratic Party and candidate for this district in 2024
- Alan Nolan (Republican), Mead School District Board member and Air Force veteran

===== Eliminated in primary =====
- Sueann Davis (Republican), former Deer Park School District Board member
- Jennifer Morton (Republican), Airway Heights City Council member
- Nicolette Ocheltree (Democratic), housing and homelessness initiative manager for the Spokane City Council
- Isaiah Paine (Republican), officer for the Spokane Home Builders Association and former legislative aid

===== Declined =====
- Mike Volz (Republican), incumbent state representative

==== Endorsements ====
Michaela Kelso (D)

Organizations

- Planned Parenthood
Alan Nolan (R)

State legislators

- Bob McCaslin Jr., former state representative from 4th district (2014–2023)

Local officials

- Larry Bowman, mayor of Airway Heights

==== Results ====
Washington's 6th State House District Position 1, 2026
Primary election
Party	Candidate	Votes	%
Democratic	Michaela Kelso	11,093	30.5
Republican	Alan Nolan	9,450	26.0
Republican	Isaiah Paine	7,035	19.4
Democratic	Nicolette Ocheltree	4,313	11.9
Republican	Jennifer Morton	2,640	7.3
Republican	Sueann Davis	1,732	4.8
Write-in		95	0.3
Total votes		36,358	100.0
General election
Democratic	Michaela Kelso		
Republican	Alan Nolan		
Write-in			
Total votes			100.0

=== Position 2 ===
The incumbent is Republican Jenny Graham who is retiring.

==== Advanced to general ====
- Jonathan Bingle (Republican), former Spokane City Council member and candidate for U.S. representative from WA 5 in 2024
- Julia Payne (Democratic), disability advocate

===== Eliminated in primary =====
- Aaron Croft (Independent), Air Force veteran

===== Declined =====
- Jenny Graham (Republican), incumbent state representative (endorsed Bingle)

==== Endorsements ====
Jonathan Bingle (R)

State legislators

- Leonard Christian, state senator from the 4th district (2025–present)
- Jeff Holy, state senator from the 6th district (2019–present)
- 5 state representatives (Note: Rob Chase, state representative from the 4th district (2021–2023; 2025–present); Andrew Engell, state representative from the 7th district (2025–present); Jenny Graham, state representative from the 6th district (2019–present); Suzanne Schmidt, state representative from the 4th district (2023–present); Mike Volz, state representative from the 6th district (2017–present) and treasurer of Spokane County (2025–present))

Local officials

- Josh Kerns, Spokane County commissioner (2017–present)
- Nadine Woodward, former mayor of Spokane (2019–2023)
Aaron Croft (I)

Organizations

- Fuse Washington
Julia Payne (D)

Political parties

- Spokane County Democrats

Organizations

- 6th Legislative District Democrats
- Washington State Stonewall Democrats

Individuals

- Michaela Kelso, executive board representative for the Spokane County Democratic Party and candidate for state representative in position 1

==== Results ====
Washington's 6th State House District Position 2, 2026
Primary election
Party	Candidate	Votes	%
Republican	Jonathan Bingle	18,651	50.6
Democratic	Julia Payne	9,209	25.0
No party preference	Aaron Croft	8,950	24.3
Write-in		74	0.2
Total votes		36,884	100.0
General election
Republican	Jonathan Bingle		
Democratic	Julia Payne		
Write-in			
Total votes			100.0

== District 7 ==
=== Position 1 ===
==== Candidates ====
===== Advanced to general =====
- Andrew Engell (Republican), incumbent state representative

==== Results ====
Washington's 7th State House District Position 1, 2026
Primary election
Party	Candidate	Votes	%
Republican	Andrew Engell (incumbent)	30,454	96.6
Write-in		1,065	3.4
Total votes		31,519	100.0
General election
Republican	Andrew Engell (incumbent)		
Write-in			
Total votes			100.0

=== Position 2 ===
==== Candidates ====
===== Advanced to general =====
- Hunter Abell (Republican), incumbent state representative

==== Results ====
Washington's 7th State House District Position 2, 2026
Primary election
Party	Candidate	Votes	%
Republican	Hunter Abell (incumbent)	30,220	96.7
Write-in		1,046	3.4
Total votes		31,266	100.0
General election
Republican	Hunter Abell (incumbent)		
Write-in			
Total votes			100.0

== District 8 ==
=== Position 1 ===
==== Candidates ====
===== Advanced to general =====
- Stephanie Barnard (Republican), incumbent state representative

==== Results ====
Washington's 8th State House District Position 1, 2026
Primary election
Party	Candidate	Votes	%
Republican	Stephanie Barnard (incumbent)	24,103	97.4
Write-in		648	2.6
Total votes		24,751	100.0
General election
Republican	Stephanie Barnard (incumbent)		
Write-in			
Total votes			100.0

=== Position 2 ===
==== Candidates ====
===== Advanced to general =====
- April Connors (Republican), incumbent state representative

==== Results ====
Washington's 8th State House District Position 2, 2026
Primary election
Party	Candidate	Votes	%
Republican	April Connors (incumbent)	24,314	97.3
Write-in		665	2.7
Total votes		24,979	100.0
General election
Republican	April Connors (incumbent)		
Write-in			
Total votes			100.0

== District 9 ==
=== Position 1 ===
==== Candidates ====
===== Advanced to general =====
- Mary Dye (Republican), incumbent state representative

==== Results ====
Washington's 9th State House District Position 1, 2026
Primary election
Party	Candidate	Votes	%
Republican	Mary Dye (incumbent)	29,519	94.5
Write-in		1,719	5.5
Total votes		31,238	100.0
General election
Republican	Mary Dye (incumbent)		
Write-in			
Total votes			100.0

=== Position 2 ===
==== Candidates ====
===== Advanced to general =====
- Joe Schmick (Republican), incumbent state representative
- Karina Wallace (Democratic), certified peer support specialist and former nursing assistant

==== Results ====
Washington's 9th State House District Position 2, 2026
Primary election
Party	Candidate	Votes	%
Republican	Joe Schmick (incumbent)	26,118	62.6
Democratic	Karina Wallace	15,534	37.2
Write-in		77	0.2
Total votes		41,729	100.0
General election
Republican	Joe Schmick (incumbent)		
Democratic	Karina Wallace		
Write-in			
Total votes			100.0

== District 10 ==
=== Position 1 ===
==== Candidates ====
===== Advanced to general =====
- Robert "Chili" Hicks (Republican), Stanwood City Council member
- Clyde Shavers (Democratic), incumbent state representative

==== Results ====
Washington's 10th State House District Position 1, 2026
Primary election
Party	Candidate	Votes	%
Democratic	Clyde Shavers (incumbent)	28,026	58.1
Republican	Robert "Chili" Hicks	20,190	41.8
Write-in		40	0.1
Total votes		48,256	100.0
General election
Democratic	Clyde Shavers (incumbent)		
Republican	Robert "Chili" Hicks		
Write-in			
Total votes			100.0

=== Position 2 ===
==== Advanced to general ====
- Tim Hazelo (Republican), former Island County Republican Party chair
- Dave Paul (Democratic), incumbent state representative

===== Eliminated in primary =====
- Carrie Kennedy (Republican), Navy veteran, candidate for this district in 2024, and candidate for U.S representative from WA 2 in 2022 and 2020

==== Endorsements ====
Tim Hazelo (R)

Political parties

- Island County Republican Party (co-endorsement with Kennedy)
- Pierce County Republican Party
- Skagit County Republican Party
- Snohomish County Republican Party
Carrie Kennedy (R)

Political parties

- Island County Republican Party (co-endorsement with Hazelo)
Dave Paul (D)

Political parties

- Skagit County Democratic Party

Organizations

- Planned Parenthood
- Sierra Club

==== Results ====
Washington's 10th State House District Position 2, 2026
Primary election
Party	Candidate	Votes	%
Democratic	Dave Paul (incumbent)	28,301	58.7
Republican	Tim Hazelo	10,584	22.0
Republican	Carrie Kennedy	9,285	19.3
Write-in		57	0.1
Total votes		48,227	100.0
General election
Democratic	Dave Paul (incumbent)		
Republican	Tim Hazelo		
Write-in			
Total votes			100.0

== District 11 ==
=== Position 1 ===
==== Advanced to general ====
- Ashley Fedan (Democratic), registered nurse anesthetist and Navy veteran
- David Hackney (Democratic), incumbent state representative

===== Eliminated in primary =====
- Christian Rombough (Republican), ironworker

==== Endorsements ====
Ashley Fedan (D)

Newspapers

- The Stranger
David Hackney (D)

Newspapers

- The Seattle Times

==== Results ====
Washington's 11th State House District Position 1, 2026
Primary election
Party	Candidate	Votes	%
Democratic	David Hackney (incumbent)	10,998	42.4
Democratic	Ashley Fedan	8,298	32.0
Republican	Christian Rombough	6,639	25.6
Write-in		33	0.1
Total votes		25,968	100.0
General election
Democratic	David Hackney (incumbent)		
Democratic	Ashley Fedan		
Write-in			
Total votes			100.0

=== Position 2 ===
==== Candidates ====
===== Advanced to general =====
- Steve Bergquist (Democratic), incumbent state representative

==== Results ====
Washington's 11th State House District Position 2, 2026
Primary election
Party	Candidate	Votes	%
Democratic	Steve Bergquist (incumbent)	19,576	94.8
Write-in		1,083	5.2
Total votes		20,659	100.0
General election
Democratic	Steve Bergquist (incumbent)		
Write-in			
Total votes			100.0

== District 12 ==
=== Position 1 ===
==== Candidates ====
===== Advanced to general =====
- Brian Burnett (Republican), incumbent state representative
- Stacy Willoughby (Democratic), bank branch manager, Chelan Valley Hope Board president and board member of Lake Chelan Chamber of Commerce

==== Results ====
Washington's 12th State House District Position 1, 2026
Primary election
Party	Candidate	Votes	%
Republican	Brian Burnett (incumbent)	22,207	50.2
Democratic	Stacy Willoughby	22,033	49.8
Write-in		36	0.1
Total votes		44,276	100.0
General election
Republican	Brian Burnett (incumbent)		
Democratic	Stacy Willoughby		
Write-in			
Total votes			100.0

=== Position 2 ===
==== Candidates ====
===== Advanced to general =====
- Maggie Adams (Democratic)
- Mike Steele (Republican), incumbent state representative

===== Eliminated in primary =====
- Adam James (Republican), pastor

==== Results ====
Washington's 12th State House District Position 2, 2026
Primary election
Party	Candidate	Votes	%
Republican	Mike Steele (incumbent)	18,242	41.1
Democratic	Maggie Adams	15,035	33.9
Republican	Adam James	11,041	24.9
Write-in		30	0.1
Total votes		44,348	100.0
General election
Republican	Mike Steele (incumbent)		
Democratic	Maggie Adams		
Write-in			
Total votes			100.0

== District 13 ==
=== Position 1 ===
==== Candidates ====
===== Advanced to general =====
- Tom Dent (Republican), incumbent state representative
- Juan "Jerry" Garcia (Democratic)

==== Results ====
Washington's 13th State House District Position 1, 2026
Primary election
Party	Candidate	Votes	%
Republican	Tom Dent (incumbent)	21,849	70.9
Democratic	Juan "Jerry" Garcia	8,898	28.9
Write-in		60	0.2
Total votes		30,807	100.0
General election
Republican	Tom Dent (incumbent)		
Democratic	Juan "Jerry" Garcia		
Write-in			
Total votes			100.0

=== Position 2 ===
The incumbent is Alex Ybarra, who is retiring to run for the state senate seat vacated by Senator Judy Warick, who is retiring.

==== Candidates ====
===== Advanced to general =====
- Deanna Martinez (Republican), former Moses Lake City Council member
- Joshua Thompson (Republican), Ellensburg City Council member

===== Eliminated in primary =====
- Don Myers (Republican), Moses Lake City Council member and former mayor of Moses Lake

===== Declined =====
- Alex Ybarra (Republican), incumbent state representative (running for State Senate)

===== Withdrawn =====
- Jeff Leichleiter (Republican), co-founder of Tim's Cascade Snacks

==== Endorsements ====
Deanna Martinez (R)

State legislators

- Nikki Torres, state senator from the 15th district (2023–present)
- Keith Wagoner, state senator from the 39th district (2018–present)
- Judy Warnick, state senator from the 13th district (2015–present)
- 5 state representatives (Note: Dan Griffey, state representative from the 35th district (2015–present); Deb Manjarrez, state representative from the 14th district (2025–present); Gloria Mendoza, state representative from the 16th district (2019–present); Skyler Rude, state representative from the 35th district (2015–present); Suzanne Schmidt, state representative from the 4th district (2023–present))

Local officials

- Roldan Capetillo, former mayor of Warden
- Kyle Curtis, Yakima County commissioner
- Rosaelia Martinez, mayor of Warden
Don Myers (R)

Local officials

- David Curnel, former mayor of Moses Lake
- Dylan King, Quincy City Council member
- Karen Leibrecht, former mayor of Moses Lake
- Matt Moore, mayor pro tempore of Ephrata
- Bruce Reim, former mayor of Ephrata
Joshua Thompson (R)

Local officials

- 3 Kittitas County commissioner
- Kevin Burgess, Grant County commissioner
- Cindy Carter, Grant County commissioner
- Darrin Jackson, Port of Moses Lake commissioner

Political parties

- Douglas County Republican Party
- Grant County Republican Party
- Kittitas County Republican Party

==== Results ====
Washington's 13th State House District Position 2, 2026
Primary election
Party	Candidate	Votes	%
Republican	Deanna Martinez	9,713	37.2
Republican	Joshua Thompson	8,924	34.2
Republican	Don Myers	7,003	26.8
Write-in		474	1.8
Total votes		26,114	100.0
General election
Republican	Deanna Martinez		
Republican	Joshua Thompson		
Write-in			
Total votes			100.0

== District 14 ==
=== Position 1 ===
==== Candidates ====
===== Advanced to general =====
- Chelsea Dimas (Democratic), communications specialist and runner-up for this district in 2024
- Gloria Mendoza (Republican), incumbent state representative

===== Eliminated in primary =====
- William Chichenoff (Independent), small business owner

==== Endorsements ====
Chelsea Dimas (D)

Labor unions

- SEIU 775
- United Farm Workers
- Washington State Labor Council
Gloria Mendoza (R)

Tribes

- Yakama

==== Results ====
Washington's 14th State House District Position 1, 2026
Primary election
Party	Candidate	Votes	%
Republican	Gloria Mendoza (incumbent)	6,759	51.4
Democratic	Chelsea Dimas	5,640	42.9
No party preference	William Chichenoff	706	5.4
Write-in		46	0.4
Total votes		13,151	100.0
General election
Republican	Gloria Mendoza (incumbent)		
Democratic	Chelsea Dimas		
Write-in			
Total votes			100.0

=== Position 2 ===
==== Candidates ====
===== Advanced to general =====
- Deb Manjarrez (Republican), incumbent state representative
- Ezequiel Morfín (Democratic), former Toppenish City Council member and immigrants rights activist

===== Eliminated in primary =====
- Tony Sandoval (Democratic), business owner, community advocate and candidate for U.S. representative from WA 4 in 2014

==== Endorsements ====
Deb Manjarrez (R)

Tribes

- Yakama
Ezequiel Morfín (D)

Political parties

- Benton County Democratic Party
- Franklin County Democratic Party
- Klickitat County Democratic Party
- Yakima County Democratic Party

==== Results ====
Washington's 14th State House District Position 2, 2026
Primary election
Party	Candidate	Votes	%
Republican	Deb Manjarrez (incumbent)	6,700	51.0
Democratic	Ezequiel Morfín	3,992	30.4
Democratic	Tony Sandoval	2,406	18.3
Write-in		30	0.2
Total votes		13,128	100.0
General election
Republican	Deb Manjarrez (incumbent)		
Democratic	Ezequiel Morfín		
Write-in			
Total votes			100.0

== District 15 ==
=== Position 1 ===
==== Candidates ====
===== Advanced to general =====
- Chris Corry (Republican), incumbent state representative
- Jack McEntire (Democratic)

==== Results ====
Washington's 15th State House District Position 1, 2026
Primary election
Party	Candidate	Votes	%
Republican	Chris Corry (incumbent)	20,900	67.2
Democratic	Jack McEntire	10,159	32.6
Write-in		67	0.2
Total votes		31,126	100.0
General election
Republican	Chris Corry (incumbent)		
Democratic	Jack McEntire		
Write-in			
Total votes			100.0

=== Position 2 ===
The incumbent is Republican Jeremie Dufault, who is retiring to run for State Senate. He initially challenged incumbent Nikki Torres (R-Pasco) before she decided to run for State Senate in the 8th District to replace Matt Boehnke (R-Kennewick). Sen. Boehnke is running for U.S. House in Washington's 4th congressional district to replace retiring incumbent Dan Newhouse (R-Sunnyside).

==== Candidates ====
===== Advanced to general =====
- Reedy Berg (Republican), Yakima City Council member
- Liz Hallock (No Kings), perennial candidate

===== Eliminated in primary =====
- Chase Foster (Republican), chair of the Kennewick House Authority and candidate for this district in 2024

===== Declined =====
- Jeremie Dufault (Republican), incumbent state representative (running for State Senate)

==== Results ====
Washington's 15th State House District Position 2, 2026
Primary election
Party	Candidate	Votes	%
Republican	Reedy Berg	14,710	48.4
No Kings	Liz Hallock	9,136	30.0
Republican	Chase Foster	6,448	21.2
Write-in		131	0.4
Total votes		30,425	100.0
General election
Republican	Reedy Berg		
No Kings	Liz Hallock		
Write-in			
Total votes			100.0

== District 16 ==
=== Position 1 ===
==== Candidates ====
===== Advanced to general =====
- Mark Klicker (Republican), incumbent state representative
- Kyle Palmer (Democratic)

==== Results ====
Washington's 16th State House District Position 1, 2026
Primary election
Party	Candidate	Votes	%
Republican	Mark Klicker (incumbent)	21,367	60.4
Democratic	Kyle Palmer	13,998	39.6
Write-in		32	0.1
Total votes		35,397	100.0
General election
Republican	Mark Klicker (incumbent)		
Democratic	Kyle Palmer		
Write-in			
Total votes			100.0

=== Position 2 ===
==== Candidates ====
===== Advanced to general =====
- Skyler Rude (Republican), incumbent state representative
- Derek Sarley (Democratic), Walla Walla School Board member

==== Results ====
Washington's 16th State House District Position 2, 2026
Primary election
Party	Candidate	Votes	%
Republican	Skyler Rude (incumbent)	20,493	58.0
Democratic	Derek Sarley	14,831	42.0
Write-in		27	0.1
Total votes		35,351	100.0
General election
Republican	Skyler Rude (incumbent)		
Democratic	Derek Sarley		
Write-in			
Total votes			100.0

== District 17 ==
=== Position 1 ===
==== Candidates ====
===== Advanced to general =====
- Ben Christly (Democratic), Navy veteran and small business owner
- Kevin Waters (Republican), incumbent state representative

===== Eliminated in primary =====
- Thomas Everett Haynes (Pro Gun Liberal)

==== Results ====
Washington's 17th State House District Position 1, 2026
Primary election
Party	Candidate	Votes	%
Democratic	Ben Christly	24,703	52.4
Republican	Kevin Waters (incumbent)	20,718	43.9
Pro Gun Liberal	Thomas Everett Haynes	1,711	3.6
Write-in		59	0.1
Total votes		47,191	100.0
General election
Democratic	Ben Christly		
Republican	Kevin Waters (incumbent)		
Write-in			
Total votes			100.0

=== Position 2 ===
==== Candidates ====
===== Advanced to general =====
- Diana Perez (Democratic), Vancouver City Council member
- David Stuebe (Republican), incumbent state representative

===== Withdrawn =====
- Terri Niles (Democratic), intensive care unit nurse and candidate for this district in 2024

==== Results ====
Washington's 17th State House District Position 2, 2026
Primary election
Party	Candidate	Votes	%
Democratic	Diana Perez	25,825	54.9
Republican	David Stuebe (incumbent)	21,170	45.0
Write-in		72	0.2
Total votes		47,067	100.0
General election
Democratic	Diana Perez		
Republican	David Stuebe (incumbent)		
Write-in			
Total votes			100.0

== District 18 ==
=== Position 1 ===
==== Candidates ====
===== Advanced to general =====
- Randi Knott (Democratic), ranch owner and retired government affairs director
- Stephanie McClintock (Republican), incumbent state representative

==== Results ====
Washington's 18th State House District Position 1, 2026
Primary election
Party	Candidate	Votes	%
Democratic	Randi Knott	22,859	52.0
Republican	Stephanie McClintock (incumbent)	21,014	47.8
Write-in		72	0.2
Total votes		43,945	100.0
General election
Democratic	Randi Knott		
Republican	Stephanie McClintock (incumbent)		
Write-in			
Total votes			100.0

=== Position 2 ===
==== Candidates ====
===== Advanced to general =====
- Deken Letinich (Democratic), union advocate and candidate for this district in 2024
- John Ley (Republican), incumbent state representative

==== Results ====
Washington's 18th State House District Position 2, 2026
Primary election
Party	Candidate	Votes	%
Democratic	Deken Letinich	23,407	53.4
Republican	John Ley (incumbent)	20,325	46.4
Write-in		86	0.2
Total votes		43,818	100.0
General election
Democratic	Deken Letinich		
Republican	John Ley (incumbent)		
Write-in			
Total votes			100.0

== District 19 ==
=== Position 1 ===
==== Candidates ====
===== Advanced to general =====
- Kevin Moynihan (Democratic), Aberdeen City Council member
- Jim Walsh (Republican), incumbent state representative and chair of the Washington State Republican Party

==== Results ====
Washington's 19th State House District Position 1, 2026
Primary election
Party	Candidate	Votes	%
Republican	Jim Walsh (incumbent)	24,113	55.5
Democratic	Kevin Moynihan	19,272	44.4
Write-in		65	0.2
Total votes		43,450	100.0
General election
Republican	Jim Walsh (incumbent)		
Democratic	Kevin Moynihan		
Write-in			
Total votes			100.0

=== Position 2 ===
==== Candidates ====
===== Advanced to general =====
- Terry Carlson (Democratic), labor leader and former process operator
- Joel McEntire (Republican), incumbent state representative

===== Eliminated in primary =====
- Daniel Bradley (Republican)
- Jimi O'Hagan (Republican), cranberry farmer and candidate for this district in 2016

==== Results ====
Washington's 19th State House District Position 2, 2026
Primary election
Party	Candidate	Votes	%
Democratic	Terry Carlson	18,354	43.2
Republican	Joel McEntire (incumbent)	17,670	41.6
Republican	Jimi O'Hagan	3,404	8.0
Republican	Daniel Bradley	2,958	7.0
Write-in		67	0.2
Total votes		42,453	100.0
General election
Democratic	Terry Carlson		
Republican	Joel McEntire (incumbent)		
Write-in			
Total votes			100.0

== District 20 ==
=== Position 1 ===
==== Candidates ====
===== Advanced to general =====
- Peter Abbarno (Republican), incumbent state representative
- Andy Zahn (Democratic)

==== Results ====
Washington's 20th State House District Position 1, 2026
Primary election
Party	Candidate	Votes	%
Republican	Peter Abbarno (incumbent)	31,475	65.6
Democratic	Andy Zahn	16,418	34.2
Write-in		82	0.2
Total votes		47,975	100.0
General election
Republican	Peter Abbarno (incumbent)		
Democratic	Andy Zahn		
Write-in			
Total votes			100.0

=== Position 2 ===
==== Candidates ====
===== Advanced to general =====
- Evan Jones (Democratic)
- Ed Orcutt (Republican), incumbent state representative

==== Results ====
Washington's 20th State House District Position 2, 2026
Primary election
Party	Candidate	Votes	%
Republican	Ed Orcutt (incumbent)	30,140	62.9
Democratic	Evan Jones	17,728	37.0
Write-in		77	0.2
Total votes		47,945	100.0
General election
Republican	Ed Orcutt (incumbent)		
Democratic	Evan Jones		
Write-in			
Total votes			100.0

== District 21 ==
=== Position 1 ===
==== Candidates ====
===== Advanced to general =====
- Jason Moon (Democratic), Mukilteo City Council president and member and candidate for this seat in 2024
- Strom Peterson (Democratic), incumbent state representative and Snohomish County Council member

==== Endorsements ====
Strom Peterson (D)

U.S. representatives

- Rick Larsen, WA-02 (2001–present)

Statewide officials

- Bob Ferguson, governor of Washington (2025–present)
- Denny Heck, lieutenant governor of Washington (2021–present)
- Nick Brown, attorney general of Washington (2025–present)
- Chris Reykdal, superintendent of public instruction for Washington (2017–present)

State legislators

- Laurie Jinkins, speaker of the State House (2020–present) and state representative from the 27th district (2025–present)

Local officials

- Dave Somers, Snohomish County executive (2016–present)

Individuals

- Rick Steves, travel writer

==== Results ====
Washington's 21st State House District Position 1, 2026
Primary election
Party	Candidate	Votes	%
Democratic	Strom Peterson (incumbent)	16,344	54.0
Democratic	Jason Moon	13,379	44.2
Write-in		551	1.8
Total votes		30,274	100.0
General election
Democratic	Strom Peterson (incumbent)		
Democratic	Jason Moon		
Write-in			
Total votes			100.0

=== Position 2 ===
==== Candidates ====
===== Advanced to general =====
- Bruce Guthrie (Libertarian), substitute teacher and candidate for this district in 2024
- Lillian Ortiz-Self (Democratic), incumbent state representative

==== Results ====
Washington's 21st State House District Position 2, 2026
Primary election
Party	Candidate	Votes	%
Democratic	Lillian Ortiz-Self (incumbent)	22,909	72.6
Libertarian	Bruce Guthrie	8,430	26.7
Write-in		215	0.7
Total votes		31,554	100.0
General election
Democratic	Lillian Ortiz-Self (incumbent)		
Libertarian	Bruce Guthrie		
Write-in			
Total votes			100.0

== District 22 ==
=== Position 1 ===
==== Candidates ====
===== Advanced to general =====
- Beth Doglio (Democratic), incumbent state representative
- Don Hewett (Republican)

==== Endorsements ====
Beth Doglio (D)

Organizations

- LGBTQ Victory Fund

==== Results ====
Washington's 22nd State House District Position 1, 2026
Primary election
Party	Candidate	Votes	%
Democratic	Beth Doglio (incumbent)	33,979	73.2
Republican	Don Hewett	12,329	26.6
Write-in		128	0.3
Total votes		46,436	100.0
General election
Democratic	Beth Doglio (incumbent)		
Republican	Don Hewett		
Write-in			
Total votes			100.0

=== Position 2 ===
==== Candidates ====
===== Advanced to general =====
- Jamie Keenan-deVargas (Democratic)
- Lisa Parshley (Democratic), incumbent state representative

==== Results ====
Washington's 22nd State House District Position 2, 2026
Primary election
Party	Candidate	Votes	%
Democratic	Lisa Parshley (incumbent)	28,156	68.2
Democratic	Jamie Keenan-deVargas	11,907	28.9
Write-in		1,215	2.9
Total votes		41,278	100.0
General election
Democratic	Lisa Parshley (incumbent)		
Democratic	Jamie Keenan-deVargas		
Write-in			
Total votes			100.0

== District 23 ==
=== Position 1 ===
==== Candidates ====
===== Advanced to general =====
- Daria Ilgen (Democratic), 23rd District Democrats executive board member
- Tarra Simmons (Democratic), incumbent state representative

===== Withdrawn =====
- Joel Ard (Republican), lawyer

==== Results ====
Washington's 23rd State House District Position 1, 2026
Primary election
Party	Candidate	Votes	%
Democratic	Tarra Simmons (incumbent)	24,583	57.2
Democratic	Daria Ilgen	16,753	39.0
Write-in		1,608	3.7
Total votes		42,944	100.0
General election
Democratic	Tara Simmons (incumbent)		
Democratic	Daria Ilgen		
Write-in			
Total votes			100.0

=== Position 2 ===
==== Candidates ====
===== Advanced to general =====
- Lance Byrd (Republican), IT professional and candidate for state senator from the 23rd district in 2024
- Greg Nance (Democratic), incumbent state representative

===== Eliminated in primary =====
- Kristin Lillegard (Democratic)

==== Endorsements ====
Kristin Lillegard (D)

Organizations

- West Sound Democratic Socialists of America

==== Results ====
Washington's 23rd State House District Position 2, 2026
Primary election
Party	Candidate	Votes	%
Democratic	Greg Nance (incumbent)	27,915	58.1
Republican	Lance Byrd	14,202	29.6
Democratic	Kristin Lillegard	5,882	12.2
Write-in		37	0.1
Total votes		48,036	100.0
General election
Democratic	Greg Nance (incumbent)		
Republican	Lance Byrd		
Write-in			
Total votes			100.0

== District 24 ==
=== Position 1 ===
==== Candidates ====
===== Advanced to general =====
- Adam Bernbaum (Democratic), incumbent state representative
- Eric Pratt (Republican), activist

===== Eliminated in primary =====
- Ted Bowen (Independent)
- Aiden Hamilton (Republican), high school student

==== Endorsements ====
Aiden Hamilton (R)

Party chapters

- Clallam County Republican Party

==== Results ====
Washington's 24th State House District Position 1, 2026
Primary election
Party	Candidate	Votes	%
Democratic	Adam Bernbaum (incumbent)	32,592	60.4
Republican	Eric Pratt	11,779	21.8
Republican	Aiden Hamilton	5,930	11.0
No party preference	Ted Bowen	3,643	6.8
Write-in		42	0.1
Total votes		53,986	100.0
General election
Democratic	Adam Bernbaum (incumbent)		
Republican	Eric Pratt		
Write-in			
Total votes			100.0

=== Position 2 ===
The incumbent is Democrat Steve Tharinger, who is retiring after dealing with health issues during the 2026 legislative session.

==== Candidates ====
===== Advanced to general =====
- Marcia Kelbon (Independent), lawyer and Republican candidate for state senator from the 24th district in 2024
- Kaylee Kuehn (Democratic), teacher and former legislative aide

===== Declared =====
- Patrick DePoe (Democratic), executive director of the Association of Washington Tribes, former Makah tribal council member, candidate for commissioner of Public Lands in 2024
- Mark Hodgson (Democratic), Port Angeles City Council member and Navy veteran
- Bradley Nemo Callaway (Democratic), soccer referee and phlebotomist

===== Declined =====
- Steve Tharinger (Democratic), incumbent state representative

==== Endorsements ====
Bradley Nemo Callaway (D)

Organizations

- North Olympic Democratic Socialists of America
- Progressive Voter's Network

==== Results ====
Washington's 24th State House District Position 2, 2026
Primary election
Party	Candidate	Votes	%
No party preference	Marcia Kelbon	19,818	37.8
Democratic	Kaylee Kuehn	13,617	26.0
Democratic	Patrick DePoe	12,699	24.2
Democratic	Mark Hodgson	3,644	7.0
Democratic	Bradley Nemo Callaway	2,374	4.5
Write-in		268	0.5
Total votes		52,420	100.0
General election
No party preference	Marcia Kelbon		
Democratic	Kaylee Kuehn		
Write-in			
Total votes			100.0

== District 25 ==
=== Position 1 ===
==== Candidates ====
===== Advanced to general =====
- David Berg (Democratic)
- Michael Keaton (Republican), incumbent state representative

===== Eliminated in primary =====
- Nick Oloo (Democratic), pastor

==== Results ====
Washington's 25th State House District Position 1, 2026
Primary election
Party	Candidate	Votes	%
Republican	Michael Keaton (incumbent)	14,460	50.2
Democratic	David Berg	10,454	36.3
Democratic	Nick Oloo	3,880	13.4
Write-in		18	0.1
Total votes		28,812	100.0
General election
Republican	Michael Keaton (incumbent)		
Democratic	David Berg		
Write-in			
Total votes			100.0

=== Position 2 ===
==== Candidates ====
===== Advanced to general =====
- Cyndy Jacobsen (Republican), incumbent state representative
- Jenn Marie Strickling (Democratic)

===== Eliminated in primary =====
- Ren Fanony (Republican)

==== Results ====
Washington's 25th State House District Position 2, 2026
Primary election
Party	Candidate	Votes	%
Republican	Cyndy Jacobsen (incumbent)	14,005	48.6
Democratic	Jenn Marie Strickling	13,466	46.7
Republican	Ren Fanony	1,333	4.6
Write-in		19	0.1
Total votes		28,823	100.0
General election
Republican	Cyndy Jacobsen (incumbent)		
Democratic	Jenn Marie Strickling		
Write-in			
Total votes			100.0

== District 26 ==
=== Position 1 ===
==== Candidates ====
===== Advanced to general =====
- Adison Richards (Democratic), incumbent state representative
- David Olson (Republican), Peninsula School Board member and runner-up for state superintendent in 2024

===== Eliminated in primary =====
- Natalie Bornfleth (Democratic), Air Force veteran and teacher

==== Results ====
Washington's 26th State House District Position 1, 2026
Primary election
Party	Candidate	Votes	%
Republican	David Olson	22,256	43.8
Democratic	Adison Richards (incumbent)	17,012	33.5
Democratic	Natalie Bornfleth	11,467	22.6
Write-in		26	0.0
Total votes		50,761	100.0
General election
Republican	David Olson		
Democratic	Adison Richards (incumbent)		
Write-in			
Total votes			100.0

=== Position 2 ===
==== Candidates ====
Incumbent Representative Michelle Caldier Valdez announced that she would not run for re-election citing personal priorities and the evolving political direction of her district.

===== Advanced to general =====
- Katy Cornell (Republican), nonprofit leader and pastor
- Renee Hernandez Greenfield (Democratic), former vice chair of the Kitsap County Democratic Party and educator

===== Eliminated in primary =====
- Randy Phillips (Independent)
- Tedd Wetherbee (Democratic), business owner

===== Declined =====
- Michelle Caldier Valdez (Republican), incumbent state representative

==== Endorsements ====
Renee Hernandez Greenfield (D)

U.S. representatives

- Emily Randall, WA-06 (2025–present) and former state senator from the 26th district (2019–2024)

Organizations

- Kitsap County Democratic Party
- Fuse Washington
Tedd Wetherbee (D)

Local officials

- Ryan Mello, Pierce County Executive (2025–present)
- Anders Ibsen, mayor of Tacoma (2026–present)

==== Results ====
Washington's 26th State House District Position 2, 2026
Primary election
Party	Candidate	Votes	%
Republican	Katy Cornell	22,635	44.7
Democratic	Renee Hernandez Greenfield	20,023	39.6
Democratic	Tedd Wetherbee	6,720	13.3
No party preference	Randy Phillips	1,213	2.4
Write-in		28	0.1
Total votes		50,619	100.0
General election
Republican	Katy Cornell		
Democratic	Renee Hernandez Greenfield		
Write-in			
Total votes			100.0

== District 27 ==
=== Position 1 ===
==== Candidates ====
===== Advanced to general =====
- Carole Sue Braaten (Republican), candidate for state senate in this district in 2024
- Laurie Jinkins (Democratic), incumbent state representative and Speaker of the House

==== Results ====
Washington's 27th State House District Position 1, 2026
Primary election
Party	Candidate	Votes	%
Democratic	Laurie Jinkins (incumbent)	26,099	77.3
Republican	Carole Sue Braaten	7,580	22.4
Write-in		104	0.3
Total votes		33,783	100.0
General election
Democratic	Laurie Jinkins (incumbent)		
Republican	Carole Sue Braaten		
Write-in			
Total votes			100.0

=== Position 2 ===
==== Candidates ====
===== Advanced to general =====
- Jake Fey (Democratic), incumbent state representative

==== Results ====
Washington's 27th State House District Position 2, 2026
Primary election
Party	Candidate	Votes	%
Democratic	Jake Fey (incumbent)	26,333	95.5
Write-in		1,230	4.5
Total votes		27,563	100.0
General election
Democratic	Jake Fey (incumbent)		
Write-in			
Total votes			100.0

== District 28 ==
=== Position 1 ===
==== Candidates ====
===== Advanced to general =====
- Mari Leavitt (Democratic), incumbent state representative
- Kathy Richardson (Republican)

==== Results ====
Washington's 28th State House District Position 1, 2026
Primary election
Party	Candidate	Votes	%
Democratic	Mari Leavitt (incumbent)	16,321	64.5
Republican	Kathy Richardson	8,927	35.3
Write-in		59	0.2
Total votes		25,307	100.0
General election
Democratic	Mari Leavitt (incumbent)		
Republican	Kathy Richardson		
Write-in			
Total votes			100.0

=== Position 2 ===
==== Candidates ====
===== Advanced to general =====
- Dan Bronoske (Democratic), incumbent state representative

==== Results ====
Washington's 28th State House District Position 2, 2026
Primary election
Party	Candidate	Votes	%
Democratic	Dan Bronoske (incumbent)	17,782	90.7
Write-in		1,826	9.3
Total votes		19,608	100.0
General election
Democratic	Dan Bronoske (incumbent)		
Write-in			
Total votes			100.0

== District 29 ==
=== Position 1 ===
==== Candidates ====
===== Advanced to general =====
- Melanie Morgan (Democratic), incumbent state representative
- Krista Perez (Democratic), author and businesswoman

==== Results ====
Washington's 29th State House District Position 1, 2026
Primary election
Party	Candidate	Votes	%
Democratic	Krista Perez	8,245	48.9
Democratic	Melanie Morgan (incumbent)	7,858	46.6
Write-in		773	4.6
Total votes		16,876	100.0
General election
Democratic	Krista Perez		
Democratic	Melanie Morgan (incumbent)		
Write-in			
Total votes			100.0

=== Position 2 ===
The incumbent is Democrat Sharlett Mena, who is retiring to run for State Senate to replace the retiring Steve Conway (D-Tacoma).

==== Candidates ====
===== Advanced to general =====
- Joe Bushnell (Democratic), Tacoma City Council member
- Patrick Stickney (Democratic), senior policy advisor and housing advocate

===== Declared =====
- Darek Blum (Republican)
- Erin Chapman-Smith (Democratic), executive director of ROOTS Young Adult Shelter and housing advocate
- Sheri Hayes (Republican)
- Natasha Laitila (Democratic), former State House and office of public defense staffer

===== Declined =====
- Sharlett Mena (Democratic), incumbent state representative (running for State Senate)

==== Endorsements ====
Erin Chapman-Smith (D)

Organizations

- Advocates for Trans Equality

==== Results ====
Washington's 29th State House District Position 2, 2026
Primary election
Party	Candidate	Votes	%
Democratic	Joe Bushnell	4,092	21.7
Democratic	Patrick Stickney	3,784	20.0
Republican	Darek Blum	3,332	17.6
Republican	Sheri Hayes	2,255	11.9
Democratic	Erin Chapman-Smith	1,793	9.5
Write-in		31	0.2
Total votes		18,899	100.0
General election
Democratic	Joe Bushnell		
Democratic	Patrick Stickney		
Write-in			
Total votes			100.0

== District 30 ==
=== Position 1 ===
==== Candidates ====
===== Advanced to general =====
- Jamila Taylor (Democratic), incumbent state representative
- Tiffany Bowyer (Republican)

==== Endorsements ====
Jamila Taylor (D)

Newspapers

- The Stranger

==== Results ====
Washington's 30th State House District Position 1, 2026
Primary election
Party	Candidate	Votes	%
Democratic	Jamila Taylor (incumbent)	14,957	64.0
Republican	Tiffany Bowyer	8,404	35.9
Write-in		29	0.1
Total votes		23,390	100.0
General election
Democratic	Jamila Taylor (incumbent)		
Republican	Tiffany Bowyer		
Write-in			
Total votes			100.0

=== Position 2 ===
==== Candidates ====
===== Advanced to general =====
- Paul McDaniel (Independent)
- Kristine Reeves (Democratic), incumbent state representative

==== Endorsements ====
Kristine Reeves (D)

Newspapers

- The Stranger

==== Results ====
Washington's 30th State House District Position 2, 2026
Primary election
Party	Candidate	Votes	%
Democratic	Kristine Reeves (incumbent)	14,714	63.7
No party preference	Paul McDaniel	8,275	35.8
Write-in		103	0.5
Total votes		23,092	100.0
General election
Democratic	Kristine Reeves (incumbent)		
No party preference	Paul McDaniel		
Write-in			
Total votes			100.0

== District 31 ==
=== Position 1 ===
==== Candidates ====
===== Advanced to general =====
- Drew Stokesbary (Republican), incumbent state representative and House Minority Leader
- Stephen Szczurko-Walton (Democratic), US Navy veteran and former nuclear engineer

==== Endorsements ====
Stephen Szczurko-Walton (D)

Newspapers

- The Stranger

==== Results ====
Washington's 31st State House District Position 1, 2026
Primary election
Party	Candidate	Votes	%
Republican	Drew Stokesbary (incumbent)	19,674	57.9
Democratic	Stephen Szczurko-Walton	14,299	42.1
Write-in		23	0.1
Total votes		33,996	100.0
General election
Republican	Drew Stokesbary (incumbent)		
Democratic	Stephen Szczurko-Walton		
Write-in			
Total votes			100.0

=== Position 2 ===
==== Candidates ====
===== Advanced to general =====
- John Bielka (Democratic)
- Josh Penner (Republican), incumbent state representative

==== Endorsements ====
John Bielka (D)

Newspapers

- The Stranger

==== Results ====
Washington's 31st State House District Position 2, 2026
Primary election
Party	Candidate	Votes	%
Republican	Josh Penner (incumbent)	19,039	56.0
Democratic	John Bielka	14,915	43.9
Write-in		32	0.1
Total votes		33,986	100.0
General election
Republican	Josh Penner (incumbent)		
Democratic	John Bielka		
Write-in			
Total votes			100.0

== District 32 ==
=== Position 1 ===
The incumbent is Democrat Cindy Ryu, who is retiring to run for State Senate against incumbent Jesse Salomon (D-Shoreline). Both the Washington State Democratic Party Chair Shasti Conrad and the Democratic Legislative Campaign Committee have indicated that they do not plan to intervene in this race before the primary and likely would not get involved in the general election if the race is between two Democrats.

==== Candidates ====
===== Advanced to general =====
- Danica Noble (Democratic), anti-trust lawyer for the Federal Trade Commission
- Keith Scully (Democratic), Shoreline City Council member

===== Eliminated in primary =====
- Chris Bloomquist (Democratic), climate and tech recruiter
- Will Chen (Democratic), Edmonds City Council member
- Jenna Nand (Democratic), Edmonds City Council member
- Lisa Rezac (Republican), candidate for this district in 2024

===== Declined =====
- Cindy Ryu, incumbent state representative (running for State Senate, endorsed Scully)

==== Endorsements ====
Chris Bloomquist (D)

State legislators

- Jesse Salomon, state senator from the 32nd district (2019–present)
- Lauren Davis, state representative from the 32nd district (2019–present)
Will Chen (D)

U.S. representatives

- Brian Baird, former WA-03 (1999–2011)

Local officials

- Jared Mead, Snohomish County Council member for the 4th District (2020–present) and former state representative from the 44th district (2019–2021)
- George Hurst, Mayor of Lynnwood (2026–present)
- Erika Barnett, Edmonds City Council member (2026–present)
- Vivian Olson, Edmonds City Council member (2020–present)
- David Parshall, Lynnwood City Council member (2024–present)
- Mike Dixon, Mukilteo City Council member (2024–present)
- Jason Moon, Mukilteo City Council member (2022–present)
- Peter Kwon, SeaTac City Council member (2016–present)
- Jay Grant, Port of Edmonds Commissioner (2022–present)
- Selena Killin, Port of Edmonds Commissioner (2024–present)
Jenna Nand (D)

State legislators

- Vandana Slatter, state senator from the 48th district (2025–present)

Local officials

- Dave Somers, Snohomish County executive (2016–present)
- George Hurst, mayor of Lynnwood (2026–present)
- Bryce Carl Owings, Lynnwood City Council member (2026–present)
- Eben Pobee, Shoreline City Council member (2022–present)
Keith Scully (D)

State legislators

- Cindy Ryu, state representative from the 32nd district (2011–present)

Organizations

- LGBTQ Victory Fund

Newspapers

- The Stranger

==== Results ====
Washington's 32nd State House District Position 1, 2026
Primary election
Party	Candidate	Votes	%
Democratic	Keith Scully	10,698	26.36
Democratic	Danica Noble	9,735	24.2
Republican	Lisa Rezac	7,612	18.9
Democratic	Will Chen	4,415	11.0
Democratic	Chris Bloomquist	4,044	10.1
Democratic	Jenna Nand	3,697	9.2
Write-in		33	0.1
Total votes		40,234	100.0
General election
Democratic	Keith Scully		
Democratic	Danica Noble		
Write-in			
Total votes			100.0

=== Position 2 ===
==== Candidates ====
===== Advanced to general =====
- Lauren Davis (Democratic), incumbent state representative
- Imraan Siddiqi (Democratic), Washington director for the Council on American-Islamic Relations and candidate for U.S. representative from WA 8 in 2024

===== Endorsements =====
Imraan Siddiqi (D)

State legislators

- Cindy Ryu, state representative from the 32nd district (2011–present)
- Shaun Scott, state representative from the 43rd district (2025–present)

Local officials

- Keith Scully, Shoreline City Council member (2016–present)
- Naren Briar, Bellevue City Council member (2026–present)

Newspapers

- The Stranger

==== Results ====
Washington's 32nd State House District Position 2, 2026
Primary election
Party	Candidate	Votes	%
Democratic	Lauren Davis (incumbent)	26,708	71.6
Democratic	Imraan Siddiqi	9,791	26.3
Write-in		749	2.1
Total votes		37,293	100.0
General election
Democratic	Lauren Davis (incumbent)		
Democratic	Imraan Siddiqi		
Write-in			
Total votes			100.0

== District 33 ==
=== Position 1 ===
==== Candidates ====
===== Advanced to general =====
- Darryl Jones (Republican), candidate for this seat in the 2025 special election
- Edwin Obras (Democratic), incumbent state representative

===== Eliminated in primary =====
- Chris Martinez (Republican)

==== Endorsements ====
Edwin Obras (D)

Newspapers

- The Stranger

==== Results ====
Washington's 33rd State House District Position 1, 2026
Primary election
Party	Candidate	Votes	%
Democratic	Edwin Obras (incumbent)	18,352	70.8
Republican	Chris Martinez	3,934	15.2
Republican	Darryl Jones	3,567	13.8
Write-in		66	0.3
Total votes		25,989	100.0
General election
Democratic	Edwin Obras (incumbent)		
Republican	Chris Martinez		
Write-in			
Total votes			100.0

=== Position 2 ===
==== Candidates ====
===== Advanced to general =====
- Mia Gregerson (Democratic), incumbent state representative
- Yuri Marinchik (Republican)

===== Declared =====
- Alex Andrade (Democratic), Burien City Council member

==== Endorsements ====
Mia Gregerson (D)

Newspapers

- The Stranger

==== Results ====
Washington's 33rd State House District Position 2, 2026
Primary election
Party	Candidate	Votes	%
Democratic	Mia Gregerson (incumbent)	13,795	53.3
Republican	Yuri Marinchik	6,317	24.4
Democratic	Alex Andrade	5,717	22.1
Write-in		53	0.2
Total votes		25,882	100.0
General election
Democratic	Mia Gregerson (incumbent)		
Republican	Yuri Marinchik		
Write-in			
Total votes			100.0

== District 34 ==
=== Position 1 ===
==== Candidates ====
===== Advanced to general =====
- Brianna Thomas (Democratic), incumbent state representative

==== Results ====
Washington's 34th State House District Position 1, 2026
Primary election
Party	Candidate	Votes	%
Democratic	Brianna Thomas (incumbent)	34,217	97.3
Write-in		944	2.7
Total votes		35,161	100.0
General election
Democratic	Brianna Thomas (incumbent)		
Write-in			
Total votes			100.0

=== Position 2 ===
==== Candidates ====
===== Advanced to general =====
- Mary Anito (Democratic)
- Joe Fitzgibbon (Democratic), incumbent state representative

==== Endorsements ====
Joe Fitzgibbon (D)

Newspapers

- The Stranger

==== Results ====
Washington's 34th State House District Position 2, 2026
Primary election
Party	Candidate	Votes	%
Democratic	Joe Fitzgibbon (incumbent)	30,680	74.5
Democratic	Mary Anito	9,999	24.3
Write-in		492	1.2
Total votes		41,171	100.0
General election
Democratic	Joe Fitzgibbon (incumbent)		
Democratic	Mary Anito		
Write-in			
Total votes			100.0

== District 35 ==
=== Position 1 ===
==== Candidates ====
===== Advanced to general =====
- Dan Griffey (Republican), incumbent state representative
- Jim Pierson (Democratic), technology consultant

===== Eliminated in primary =====
- Shaena Garberich (Democratic), candidate for Shelton City Council in 2025

==== Results ====
Washington's 35th State House District Position 1, 2026
Primary election
Party	Candidate	Votes	%
Republican	Dan Griffey (incumbent)	26,669	53.3
Democratic	Jim Pierson	14,047	28.1
Democratic	Shaena Garberich	9,320	18.6
Write-in		33	0.1
Total votes		50,069	100.0
General election
Republican	Dan Griffey (incumbent)		
Democratic	Jim Pierson		
Write-in			
Total votes			100.0

=== Position 2 ===
==== Candidates ====
===== Advanced to general =====
- Travis Couture (Republican), incumbent state representative
- Maria Littlesun (Democratic), social worker

==== Results ====
Washington's 35th State House District Position 2, 2026
Primary election
Party	Candidate	Votes	%
Republican	Travis Couture (incumbent)	26,651	53.2
Democratic	Maria Littlesun	23,368	46.7
Write-in		51	0.1
Total votes		50,070	100.0
General election
Republican	Travis Couture (incumbent)		
Democratic	Maria Littlesun		
Write-in			
Total votes			100.0

== District 36 ==
=== Position 1 ===
==== Candidates ====
===== Advanced to general =====
- Julia Reed (Democratic), incumbent state representative

==== Results ====
Washington's 36th State House District Position 1, 2026
Primary election
Party	Candidate	Votes	%
Democratic	Julia Reed (incumbent)	40,696	98.2
Write-in		746	1.8
Total votes		41,442	100.0
General election
Democratic	Julia Reed (incumbent)		
Write-in			
Total votes			100.0

=== Position 2 ===
==== Candidates ====
===== Advanced to general =====
- Liz Berry (Democratic), incumbent state representative

==== Results ====
Washington's 36th State House District Position 2, 2026
Primary election
Party	Candidate	Votes	%
Democratic	Liz Berry (incumbent)	40,870	98.1
Write-in		777	1.9
Total votes		41,647	100.0
General election
Democratic	Liz Berry (incumbent)		
Write-in			
Total votes			100.0

== District 37 ==
=== Position 1 ===
==== Candidates ====
===== Advanced to general =====
- Sharon Tomiko Santos (Democratic), incumbent state representative
- Kelabe Tewolde (Democratic), educator

==== Endorsements ====
Kelabe Tewolde (D)

Newspapers

- The Stranger

==== Results ====
Washington's 37th State House District Position 1, 2026
Primary election
Party	Candidate	Votes	%
Democratic	Kelabe Tewolde	19,902	51.5
Democratic	Sharon Tomiko Santos (incumbent)	18,517	47.9
Write-in		250	0.7
Total votes		38,669	100.0
General election
Democratic	Kelabe Tewolde		
Democratic	Sharon Tomiko Santos (incumbent)		
Write-in			
Total votes			100.0

=== Position 2 ===
The incumbent is Democrat Chipalo Street, who is retiring to run for State Senate to replace incumbent Rebecca Saldaña (D-Seattle). Sen. Saldaña is retiring to run for the King County Council seat vacated by Girmay Zahilay when he won his election to become King County Executive in 2025.

==== Candidates ====
===== Advanced to general =====
- Evon McCorkle (Independent), college student
- Jaelynn Scott (Democratic), executive director of the Lavender Rights Project

===== Declined =====
- Chipalo Street (Democratic), incumbent state representative (running for State Senate)

==== Endorsements ====
Jaelynn Scott (D)

U.S. senators

- Bernie Sanders, Vermont (2007–present) (Independent)

Organizations

- Advocates for Trans Equality
- LGBTQ+ Victory Fund
- Seattle Democratic Socialists of America

Newspapers

- The Stranger

==== Results ====
Washington's 37th State House District Position 2, 2026
Primary election
Party	Candidate	Votes	%
Democratic	Jaelynn Scott	33,678	88.3
No party preference	Evon McCorkle	4,143	10.9
Write-in		317	0.8
Total votes		38,138	100.0
General election
Democratic	Jaelynn Scott		
No party preference	Evon McCorkle		
Write-in			
Total votes			100.0

== District 38 ==
=== Position 1 ===
==== Candidates ====
===== Advanced to general =====
- Julio Cortes (Democratic), incumbent state representative
- Jeff Kelly (Cascade)

===== Eliminated in primary =====
- Annie Fitzgerald (Democratic), candidate for the district in 2024

==== Results ====
Washington's 38th State House District Position 1, 2026
Primary election
Party	Candidate	Votes	%
Democratic	Julio Cortes (incumbent)	13,707	51.1
Cascade	Jeff Kelly	7,627	28.4
Democratic	Annie Fitzgerald	5,176	19.3
Write-in		315	1.2
Total votes		26,825	100.0
General election
Democratic	Julio Cortes (incumbent)		
Cascade	Jeff Kelly		
Write-in			
Total votes			100.0

=== Position 2 ===
==== Candidates ====
===== Advanced to general =====
- Mary Fosse (Democratic), incumbent state representative

==== Results ====
Washington's 38th State House District Position 2, 2026
Primary election
Party	Candidate	Votes	%
Democratic	Mary Fosse (incumbent)	20,443	92.6
Write-in		1,644	7.4
Total votes		22,087	100.0
General election
Democratic	Mary Fosse (incumbent)		
Write-in			
Total votes			100.0

== District 39 ==
=== Position 1 ===
==== Candidates ====
===== Advanced to general =====
- Kathryn Lewandowsky (Democratic), retired nurse and independent candidate for this district in 2024
- Sam Low (Republican), incumbent state representative and Snohomish County Council member for district 5

===== Eliminated in primary =====
- Dusty Wisniew (Republican)

==== Results ====
Washington's 39th State House District Position 1, 2026
Primary election
Party	Candidate	Votes	%
Democratic	Kathryn Lewandowsky	15,940	43.4
Republican	Sam Low (incumbent)	15,836	43.1
Republican	Dusty Wisniew	4,912	13.4
Write-in		30	0.1
Total votes		36,718	100.0
General election
Democratic	Kathryn Lewandowsky		
Republican	Sam Low (incumbent)		
Write-in			
Total votes			100.0

=== Position 2 ===
The incumbent is Republican Carolyn Eslick, who is retiring.

==== Advanced to general ====
- Steve Ewing (Republican), former Lake Stevens City Council member
- Ida Keeley (Democratic), Snohomish County superior court assistant administrator

===== Eliminated in primary =====
- Lacey Sauvageau (Republican), 911 dispatcher and Democratic candidate for the 38th district in 2020
- Robert Sutherland (Republican), former state representative from the 39th district (2019–2023)

===== Declined =====
- Carolyn Eslick (Republican), incumbent state representative

==== Endorsements ====
Steve Ewing (R)

State legislators

- Keith Wagoner, state senator from the 39th district (2018–present)
- Carolyn Eslick, state representative from the 39th district (2017–present)
- Sam Low, state representative from the 39th district (2022–present)

Local officials

- Nate Nehring, Snohomish County Council member from the 1st district (2017–present)
- Brett Gailey, former mayor of Lake Stevens (2020–2026)
- Jon Nehring, mayor of Marysville
- Russell Wiita, mayor of Sultan
Ida Keeley (D)

Local officials

- Adam Cornell, former Snohomish County prosecutor (2019–2023)
Robert Sutherland (R)

Organizations

- 39th Legislative District Republican committee

==== Results ====
Washington's 39th State House District Position 2, 2026
Primary election
Party	Candidate	Votes	%
Democratic	Ida Keeley	16,742	45.8
Republican	Steve Ewing	9,817	26.8
Republican	Robert Sutherland	9,072	24.8
Republican	Lacey Sauvageau	937	2.6
Write-in		30	0.1
Total votes		36,598	100.0
General election
Democratic	Ida Keeley		
Republican	Steve Ewing		
Write-in			
Total votes			100.0

== District 40 ==
=== Position 1 ===
==== Candidates ====
===== Advanced to general =====
- Cindy Carter (Republican), former chemist at Virginia Mason Medical Center
- Debra Lekanoff (Democratic), incumbent state representative

==== Results ====
Washington's 40th State House District Position 1, 2026
Primary election
Party	Candidate	Votes	%
Democratic	Debra Lekanoff (incumbent)	34,514	72.6
Republican	Cindy Carter	12,966	27.3
Write-in		59	0.1
Total votes		47,539	100.0
General election
Democratic	Debra Lekanoff (incumbent)		
Republican	Cindy Carter		
Write-in			
Total votes			100.0

=== Position 2 ===
==== Candidates ====
===== Advanced to general =====
- Alex Ramel (Democratic), incumbent state representative
- Joseph Segault (Independent)

===== Declared =====
- Monte Jay Mahan (Independent), hearing instrument specialist
- Salomon Rodrigue Mbouombouo (Independent)

==== Results ====
Washington's 40th State House District Position 2, 2026
Primary election
Party	Candidate	Votes	%
Democratic	Alex Ramel (incumbent)	31,216	67.8
No party preference	Joseph Segault	5,988	13.0
No party preference	Salomon Rodrigue Mbouombouo	4,903	10.6
No party preference	Monte Jay Mahan	3,833	8.3
Write-in		121	0.3
Total votes		46,061	100.0
General election
Democratic	Alex Ramel (incumbent)		
No party preference	Joseph Segault		
Write-in			
Total votes			100.0

== District 41 ==
=== Position 1 ===
==== Candidates ====
===== Advanced to general =====
- Elle Nguyen (Republican), candidate for this district in 2022
- Janice Zahn (Democratic), incumbent state representative

===== Eliminated in primary =====
- Alex Tsimerman (Standup-America), perennial candidate

==== Endorsements ====
Janice Zahn (D)

Newspapers

- The Stranger

==== Results ====
Washington's 41st State House District Position 1, 2026
Primary election
Party	Candidate	Votes	%
Democratic	Janice Zahn (incumbent)	26,578	72.0
Republican	Elle Nguyen	9,871	26.8
Standup-America	Alex Tsimerman	385	1.0
Write-in		57	0.2
Total votes		36,891	100.0
General election
Democratic	Janice Zahn (incumbent)		
Republican	Elle Nguyen		
Write-in			
Total votes			100.0

=== Position 2 ===
==== Candidates ====
===== Advanced to general =====
- Michael Rosen (Independent)
- My-Linh Thai (Democratic), incumbent state representative

==== Endorsements ====
My-Linh Thai (D)

Newspapers

- The Stranger

==== Results ====
Washington's 41st State House District Position 2, 2026
Primary election
Party	Candidate	Votes	%
Democratic	My-Linh Thai (incumbent)	24,035	66.3
No party preference	Michael Rosen	12,106	33.4
Write-in		100	0.3
Total votes		36,241	100.0
General election
Democratic	My-Linh Thai (incumbent)		
No party preference	Michael Rosen		
Write-in			
Total votes			100.0

== District 42 ==
=== Position 1 ===
==== Candidates ====
===== Advanced to general =====
- Misty Flowers (Republican), anti-vaccine activist and Whatcom County Republican Party chair
- Alicia Rule (Democratic), incumbent state representative

==== Results ====
Washington's 42nd State House District Position 1, 2026
Primary election
Party	Candidate	Votes	%
Democratic	Alicia Rule (incumbent)	27,934	56.2
Republican	Misty Flowers	21,655	43.6
Write-in		102	0.2
Total votes		49,691	100.0
General election
Democratic	Alicia Rule (incumbent)		
Republican	Misty Flowers		
Write-in			
Total votes			100.0

=== Position 2 ===
==== Candidates ====
===== Advanced to general =====
- Justin Pike (Republican), detective with the Whatcom County Sheriff's Office
- Joe Timmons (Democratic), incumbent state representative

==== Results ====
Washington's 42nd State House District Position 2, 2026
Primary election
Party	Candidate	Votes	%
Democratic	Joe Timmons (incumbent)	26,802	53.9
Republican	Justin Pike	22,911	46.0
Write-in		60	0.1
Total votes		49,773	100.0
General election
Democratic	Joe Timmons (incumbent)		
Republican	Justin Pike		
Write-in			
Total votes			100.0

== District 43 ==
=== Position 1 ===
==== Candidates ====
===== Advanced to general =====
- Alby Clendennin (Democratic), residence hall director at the University of Washington
- Nicole Macri (Democratic), incumbent state representative

==== Endorsements ====
Nicole Macri (D)

Organizations

- LGBTQ Victory Fund

Newspapers

- The Stranger

==== Results ====
Washington's 43rd State House District Position 1, 2026
Primary election
Party	Candidate	Votes	%
Democratic	Nicole Macri (incumbent)	32,872	91.5
Democratic	Alby Clendennin	2,647	7.4
Write-in		394	1.1
Total votes		35,913	100.0
General election
Democratic	Nicole Macri (incumbent)		
Democratic	Alby Clendennin		
Write-in			
Total votes			100.0

=== Position 2 ===
==== Candidates ====
===== Advanced to general =====
- Shaun Scott (Democratic), incumbent state representative

==== Endorsements ====
Shaun Scott (D)

Organizations

- Seattle Democratic Socialists of America
- Washington Working Families Party

==== Results ====
Washington's 43rd State House District Position 2, 2026
Primary election
Party	Candidate	Votes	%
Democratic	Shaun Scott (incumbent)	29,474	96.8
Write-in		976	3.2
Total votes		30,450	100.0
General election
Democratic	Shaun Scott (incumbent)		
Write-in			
Total votes			100.0

== District 44 ==
=== Position 1 ===
==== Candidates ====
===== Advanced to general =====
- Brandy Donaghy (Democratic), incumbent state representative
- Chris Elder (Republican), US Navy veteran and farmer

==== Results ====
Washington's 44th State House District Position 1, 2026
Primary election
Party	Candidate	Votes	%
Democratic	Brandy Donaghy (incumbent)	21,460	59.6
Republican	Chris Elder	14,485	40.3
Write-in		35	0.1
Total votes		35,980	100.0
General election
Democratic	Brandy Donaghy (incumbent)		
Republican	Chris Elder		
Write-in			
Total votes			100.0

=== Position 2 ===
==== Candidates ====
===== Advanced to general =====
- April Berg (Democratic), incumbent state representative
- Tonya Stadlman (Republican)

==== Results ====
Washington's 44th State House District Position 2, 2026
Primary election
Party	Candidate	Votes	%
Democratic	April Berg (incumbent)	22,107	61.4
Republican	Tonya Stadlman	13,863	38.5
Write-in		37	0.1
Total votes		36,007	100.0
General election
Democratic	April Berg (incumbent)		
Republican	Tonya Stadlman		
Write-in			
Total votes			100.0

== District 45 ==
=== Position 1 ===
==== Candidates ====
===== Advanced to general =====
- Roger Goodman (Democratic), incumbent state representative
- JoAnn Tolentino (Republican)

==== Endorsements ====
Roger Goodman (D)

Newspapers

- The Stranger

==== Results ====
Washington's 45th State House District Position 1, 2026
Primary election
Party	Candidate	Votes	%
Democratic	Roger Goodman (incumbent)	27,038	72.9
Republican	JoAnn Tolentino	9,967	26.9
Write-in		88	0.2
Total votes		37,093	100.0
General election
Democratic	Roger Goodman (incumbent)		
Republican	JoAnn Tolentino		
Write-in			
Total votes			100.0

=== Position 2 ===
The incumbent is Democrat Larry Springer who is retiring.

==== Candidates ====
===== Advanced to general =====
- John Gibbons (Republican), perennial candidate
- Vanessa Kritzer (Democratic), Redmond City Council member and executive director of the Washington Association of Land Trusts

===== Eliminated in primary =====
- Chandler Torbett (Democratic), tech attorney and small business owner

===== Declined =====
- Larry Springer (Democratic), incumbent state representative

==== Endorsements ====
Vanessa Kritzer (D)

Newspapers

- The Stranger

Organizations

- Fuse Washington

==== Results ====
Washington's 45th State House District Position 2, 2026
Primary election
Party	Candidate	Votes	%
Democratic	Vanessa Kritzer	22,890	62.7
Republican	John Gibbons	7,630	20.9
Democratic	Chandler Torbett	5,873	16.1
Write-in		105	0.3
Total votes		36,498	100.0
General election
Democratic	Vanessa Kritzer		
Republican	John Gibbons		
Write-in			
Total votes			100.0

== District 46 ==
=== Position 1 ===
==== Candidates ====
===== Advanced to general =====
- Will Dreher (Democratic), former federal prosecutor
- Gerry Pollet (Democratic), incumbent state representative

===== Eliminated in primary =====
- Ron Davis (Democratic), progressive activist, former tech entrepreneur and runner-up for Seattle City Council in 2023

==== Endorsements ====
Ron Davis (D)

Local officials

- Katie Wilson, mayor of Seattle (2026–present)

Newspapers

- The Urbanist
Will Dreher (D)

Local officials

- Erika Evans, Seattle City Attorney (2026–present)
- Dionne Foster, Seattle City Council member for position 9 (2026–present)

Organizations

- College Democrats of Washington

Newspapers

- The Stranger
Gerry Pollet (D)

State legislators

- Nicole Macri, state representative from the 43rd district (2017–present)
- Julia Reed, state representative from the 36th district (2023–present)
- Shaun Scott, state representative from the 43rd district (2025–present)

Individuals

- Ron Davis, progressive activist, former tech entrepreneur and primary candidate for this seat

==== Results ====
Washington's 46th State House District Position 1, 2026
Primary election
Party	Candidate	Votes	%
Democratic	Gerry Pollet (incumbent)	22,807	51.6
Democratic	Will Dreher	13,592	30.8
Democratic	Ron Davis	7,441	16.8
Write-in		365	0.8
Total votes		44,205	100.0
General election
Democratic	Gerry Pollet (incumbent)		
Democratic	Will Dreher		
Write-in			
Total votes			100.0

=== Position 2 ===
==== Candidates ====
===== Advanced to general =====
- Darya Farivar (Democratic), incumbent state representative
- Rodney 'Star' Thornley (Independent)

==== Endorsements ====
Darya Farivar (D)

Newspapers

- The Stranger

Organizations

- Washington Working Families Party

==== Results ====
Washington's 46th State House District Position 2, 2026
Primary election
Party	Candidate	Votes	%
Democratic	Darya Farivar (incumbent)	39,373	89.4
No party preference	Rodney 'Star' Thornley	4,386	10.0
Write-in		279	0.6
Total votes		44,038	100.0
General election
Democratic	Darya Farivar (incumbent)		
No party preference	Rodney 'Star' Thornley		
Write-in			
Total votes			100.0

== District 47 ==
=== Position 1 ===
==== Candidates ====
===== Advanced to general =====
- Cobi Clark (Libertarian)
- Debra Entenman (Democratic), incumbent state representative

===== Eliminated in primary =====
- Logan Evans (Cascade Democrat)
- Jasnoor Kaur Hans (Democratic)

==== Endorsements ====
Debra Entenman (D)

Newspapers

- The Stranger

==== Results ====
Washington's 47th State House District Position 1, 2026
Primary election
Party	Candidate	Votes	%
Democratic	Debra Entenman (incumbent)	10,619	37.9
Libertarian	Cobi Clark	8,361	29.9
Democratic	Jasnoor Kaur Hans	5,647	20.2
Cascade Democrat	Logan Evans	3,047	10.9
Write-in		314	1.1
Total votes		27,988	100.0
General election
Democratic	Debra Entenman (incumbent)		
Libertarian	Cobi Clark		
Write-in			
Total votes			100.0

=== Position 2 ===
==== Candidates ====
===== Advanced to general =====
- Ted Cooke (Republican), perennial candidate
- Chris Stearns (Democratic), incumbent state representative

==== Endorsements ====
Chris Stearns (D)

Newspapers

- The Stranger

==== Results ====
Washington's 48th State House District Position 2, 2026
Primary election
Party	Candidate	Votes	%
Democratic	Chris Stearns (incumbent)	17,457	60.2
Republican	Ted Cooke	11,521	39.7
Write-in		46	0.2
Total votes		29,024	100.0
General election
Democratic	Chris Stearns (incumbent)		
Republican	Ted Cooke		
Write-in			
Total votes			100.0

== District 48 ==
=== Position 1 ===
==== Candidates ====
===== Advanced to general =====
- Jeffery Poppe (Republican), retired CPA
- Osman Salahuddin (Democratic), incumbent state representative

==== Endorsements ====
Osman Salahuddin (D)

Newspapers

- The Seattle Times
- The Stranger

==== Results ====
Washington's 48th State House District Position 1, 2026
Primary election
Party	Candidate	Votes	%
Democratic	Osman Salahuddin (incumbent)	18,388	70.6
Republican	Jeffery Poppe	7,599	29.2
Write-in		60	0.2
Total votes		26,047	100.0
General election
Democratic	Osman Salahuddin (incumbent)		
Republican	Jeffery Poppe		
Write-in			
Total votes			100.0

=== Position 2 ===
==== Candidates ====
===== Advanced to general =====
- Jessica Forsythe (Democratic), Redmond City Council member
- Amy Walen (Democratic), incumbent state representative

==== Endorsements ====
Jessica Forsythe (D)

Newspapers

- The Stranger

Organizations

- Fuse Washington

==== Results ====
Washington's 48th State House District Position 2, 2026
Primary election
Party	Candidate	Votes	%
Democratic	Jessica Forsythe	11,708	49.0
Democratic	Amy Walen (incumbent)	11,691	48.9
Write-in		517	2.2
Total votes		23,916	100.0
General election
Democratic	Jessica Forsythe		
Democratic	Amy Walen (incumbent)		
Write-in			
Total votes			100.0

== District 49 ==
=== Position 1 ===
The incumbent is Democrat Sharon Wylie, who is retiring to run for Clark County Auditor to replace retiring incumbent Greg Kimsey (R-Vancouver).

==== Candidates ====
===== Advanced to general =====
- Kim Harless (Democratic), Vancouver City Council member
- Sarah Mittelman (Republican), nurse practitioner and former chair of the Clark County Democratic Women

===== Eliminated in primary =====
- Mike Pond (Democratic), union organizer and candidate for Vancouver City Council in 2021 and 2019

===== Declined =====
- Sharon Wylie (Democratic), incumbent state representative (running for Clark County Auditor)

==== Endorsements ====
Mike Pond (D)

Local officials

- Kathy Decker, Vancouver School Board director (2020–present)
- Wil Fuentes, Clark County Council member (2025–present)
- Eric LaBrant, Port of Vancouver Commissioner (2016–present)
- Anne McEnerny-Ogle, mayor of Vancouver (2018–present)
- Erik Paulsen, Vancouver City Council member (2019–present)
- Brad Richardson, Port of Camas-Washougal commissioner (2026–present)
- Sandra Zavala, Vancouver School Board director (2021–present)
- Eric Zimmerman, Portland City Council member (2024–present)

==== Results ====
Washington's 49th State House District Position 1, 2026
Primary election
Party	Candidate	Votes	%
Democratic	Kim Harless	17,809	52.5
Republican	Sarah Mittelman	9,652	28.5
Democratic	Mike Pond	6,387	18.8
Write-in		53	0.2
Total votes		33,901	100.0
General election
Democratic	Kim Harless		
Republican	Sarah Mittelman		
Write-in			
Total votes			100.0

=== Position 2 ===
==== Candidates ====
===== Advanced to general =====
- Monica Stonier (Democratic), incumbent state representative
- Derek Thompson (Republican)

==== Results ====
Washington's 49th State House District Position 2, 2026
Primary election
Party	Candidate	Votes	%
Democratic	Monica Stonier (incumbent)	24,398	72.6
Republican	Derek Thompson	9,095	27.1
Write-in		107	0.3
Total votes		33,600	100.0
General election
Democratic	Monica Stonier (incumbent)		
Republican	Derek Thompson		
Write-in			
Total votes			100.0

== See also ==
- Washington House of Representatives
- Elections in Washington (state)
- Washington State Redistricting Commission
- Political party strength in Washington (state)
