= 2026 King County elections =

- November 3, 2026

A general election was held in King County, Washington, on November 3, 2026, to elect various county-level positions. Primary elections were held on August 4, 2026, for races in which more than two candidates filed to run.

== Assessor ==
The incumbent assessor John Wilson declined to run for re-election. Wilson faced multiple calls to resign from the King County Council and other elected officials in King County over allegations of repeatedly stalking his ex-wife and violating a restraining order she had against him.

=== Candidates ===
==== Declared ====
- Al Dams, chief deputy assessor
- Rob Foxcurran, hearing examiner
- Chris Roberts, Shoreline city councilmember from the 4th district and former mayor
- Dominique Scarimbolo, small business owner

==== Declined ====
- John Wilson, incumbent assessor

=== Primary election ===
==== Endorsements ====
Rob Foxcurran

Newspapers

- The Stranger
Chris Roberts

State legislators

- Javier Valdez, state senator from the 46th district (2023–present)
- Lauren Davis, state representative from the 32nd district (2019–present)
- Chris Stearns, state representative from the 47th district (2022–present)
- Amy Walen, state representative from the 48th district (2019–present)

Local officials

- Girmay Zahilay, King County Executive (2025–present)
- Rod Dembowski, King County Council member from the 1st district (2013–present)

==== Results ====
Nonpartisan primary
Candidate	Votes	%
Rob Foxcurran	231,854	47.07
Dominique Scarimbolo	94,725	19.23
Chris Roberts	91,770	18.63
Al Dams	72,783	14.78
Write-in	1,477	0.30
Total votes	492,609	100.00

=== General election ===
==== Results ====
2026 King County Assessor election
Candidate	Votes	%
Rob Foxcurran		
Dominique Scarimbolo		
Write-in		
Total votes		100.00

== County Council ==
2026 King County Council election
- November 3, 2026

4 of 9 seats on the King County Council Officially nonpartisan
Party	Democratic	Republican
Current seats	7	2
Seats needed	Steady	▲3

Four of nine seats on the King County Council are up for election. In 2022, an amendment to the county charter was passed that shifted King County elections from odd-numbered year elections to even-numbered years. As a result, the 2025 election was the last election to be held on an odd-numbered year, with 2026 being the first of the even-numbered year elections.

=== District 2 ===
District 2 represents Bryn Mawr-Skyway, northern Tukwila and eastern Seattle, including the Capitol Hill, Central District, Eastlake, Laurelhurst, Rainier Valley and University District neighborhoods.

Council member Girmay Zahilay resigned in 2025 after taking office as King County Executive. Zahilay nominated three potential candidates for the King County Council to appoint. All three were Black women, ensuring the appointee would be the first Black woman to serve on the King County Council. Additionally, the appointment of a woman made the King County Council majority female for the first time in its history.

The King County Council selected Rhonda Lewis. All three nominees, including Lewis, pledged to not run in the 2026 election.

==== Candidates ====
===== Declared =====
- Toshiko Hasegawa, Port of Seattle commissioner for position 4 (2022–present)
- Rebecca Saldaña, state senator from the 37th legislative district (2016–present)

===== Filed paperwork =====
- Miriam Mboya

===== Declined =====
- Nimco Bulale, senior program officer at the Seattle Foundation and interim nominee
- Cherryl Jackson-Williams, engagement coordinator for the Renton School District and interim nominee
- Rhonda Lewis, incumbent council member

==== Endorsements ====
Toshiko Hasegawa

Local officials

- Rod Dembowski, King County Council member from the 1st district (2013–present)
- Erika Evans, Seattle City Attorney (2025–present)
- Joy Hollingsworth, Seattle City Council president (2026–present) from the 3rd district (2023–present)
- 3 other Seattle City Council members (Note: Eddie Lin, Seattle City Council member from the 2nd district (2025–present); Alexis Mercedes Rinck, Seattle City Council member from the 8th position (2024–present); Dan Strauss, Seattle City Council member from the 6th district (2020–present))
- Teresa Mosqueda, King County Council member from the 8th district (2024–present) (co-endorsement with Saldaña)

State legislators

- 6 state representatives (Note: Steve Bergquist, state representative from the 11th district (2013–present); Darya Farivar, state representative from the 46th district (2023–present); David Hackney, state representative from the 11th district (2021–present); Gerry Pollet, state representative from the 46th district (2011–present); Sharon Tomiko Santos, state representative from the 37th district (1999–present); Chipalo Street, state representative from the 37th district (2023–present) (co-endorsement with Saldaña))
Rebecca Saldaña

Local officials

- Larry Gossett, former King County Council member from the 2nd district (1994–2020)
- Teresa Mosqueda, King County Council member from the 8th district (2024–present) (co-endorsement with Hasegawa)

State legislators

- Jamie Pedersen, majority leader of the Washington State Senate (2025–present) from the 43rd district
- 9 other state senators (Note: Emily Alvarado, state senator from the 34th district (2025–present); Adrian Cortes, state senator from the 18th district (2025–present); Manka Dhingra, state senator from the 45th district (2017–present); Claudia Kauffman, state senator from the 47th district (2007–2011, 2023–present); Marko Liias, state senator from the 21st district (2014–present); Marcus Riccelli, state senator from the 3rd district (2025–present); Vandana Slatter, state senator from the 48th district (2025–present); Javier Valdez, state senator from the 46th district (2023–present); Claire Wilson, state senator from the 30th district (2019–present))
- 11 state representatives (Note: Liz Berry, state representative from the 36th district (2021–present); Mia Gregerson, state representative from the 33rd district (2013–present); Nicole Macri, state representative from the 43rd district (2017–present); Shaun Scott, state representative from the 43rd district (2025–present); Sharlett Mena, state representative from the 29th district (2023–present); Edwin Obras, state representative from the 33rd district (2024–present); Lillian Ortiz-Self, state representative from the 21st district (2014–present); Julia Reed, state representative from the 36th district (2023–present); Chipalo Street, state representative from the 37th district (2023–present) (co-endorsement with Hasegawa); Jamila Taylor, state representative from the 30th district (2021–present); Brianna Thomas, state representative from the 34th district (2025–present))

=== District 4 ===
District 4 represents northwestern Seattle, including the Ballard, Belltown, Broadview, Fremont, Green Lake, Interbay and Queen Anne neighborhoods.

Incumbent council member Jorge Barón is seeking reelection.

==== Candidates ====
===== Declared =====
- Jorge Barón, incumbent council member (2024–present)

==== Endorsements ====
Jorge Barón

U.S. representative

- Pramila Jayapal, U.S. representative from WA-07 (2017–present)

Local officials

- Claudia Balducci, King County Council member from the 6th district (2016–present)
- Jeanne Kohl-Welles, King County Council member from the 4th district (2016–2024)

=== District 6 ===
District 6 represents northern Bellevue, Clyde Hill, Medina, Mercer Island and southwestern Redmond.

Incumbent council member Claudia Balducci is seeking reelection.

==== Candidates ====
===== Declared =====
- Claudia Balducci, incumbent council member (2016–present)

==== Endorsements ====
Claudia Balducci

U.S. representative

- Suzan DelBene, U.S. representative from WA-01 (2012–present)

=== District 8 ===
District 8 represents Burien, Tukwila, Vashon and southwestern Seattle, including the Alki, Delridge, Fauntleroy, Georgetown and West Seattle neighborhoods.

Incumbent council member Teresa Mosqueda is seeking reelection.

==== Candidates ====
===== Declared =====
- Teresa Mosqueda, incumbent council member (2024–present)

==== Endorsements ====
Teresa Mosqueda

U.S. representative

- Pramila Jayapal, U.S. representative from WA-07 (2017–present)

State officials

- Bob Ferguson, governor of Washington (2025–present)
- Chris Reykdal, Washington State superintendent of Public Instruction (2017–present)

Local officials

- Katie Wilson, mayor of Seattle (2026–present)

== Elections Director ==
=== Candidates ===
==== Declared ====
- Julie Wise, incumbent elections director

=== General election ===
==== Results ====
2026 King County Elections Director election
Candidate	Votes	%
Julie Wise (incumbent)		
Write-in		
Total votes		100.00

== Prosecuting Attorney ==
=== Candidates ===
==== Declared ====
- Leesa Manion, incumbent prosecuting attorney

=== Endorsements ===
Leesa Manion

Statewide officials

- Christine Gregoire former governor of Washington (2005–2013)
- Gary Locke, former governor of Washington (1997–2005)

Local officials

- Girmay Zahilay, King County Executive (2025–present)
- Dow Constantine, former King County Executive (2009–2025)
- Dan Satterberg, former King County Prosecuting Attorney (2007–2023)

=== General election ===
==== Results ====
2026 King County Prosecuting Attorney election
Candidate	Votes	%
Leesa Manion (incumbent)		
Write-in		
Total votes		100.00

== See also ==
- King County, Washington
- Elections in Washington (state)
- Washington State Redistricting Commission
