= Senator Alvarado =

Senator Alvarado may refer to:

- Carol Alvarado (born 1967), Texas State Senate
- Emily Alvarado (politician) ((fl. 2020s), Washington State Senate
- Marie Alvarado-Gil (born 1973), California State Senate
- Ralph Alvarado (born 1970), Kentucky State Senate
