= Jaelynn Scott =

African American transgender community organizer

Jaelynn P. Scott
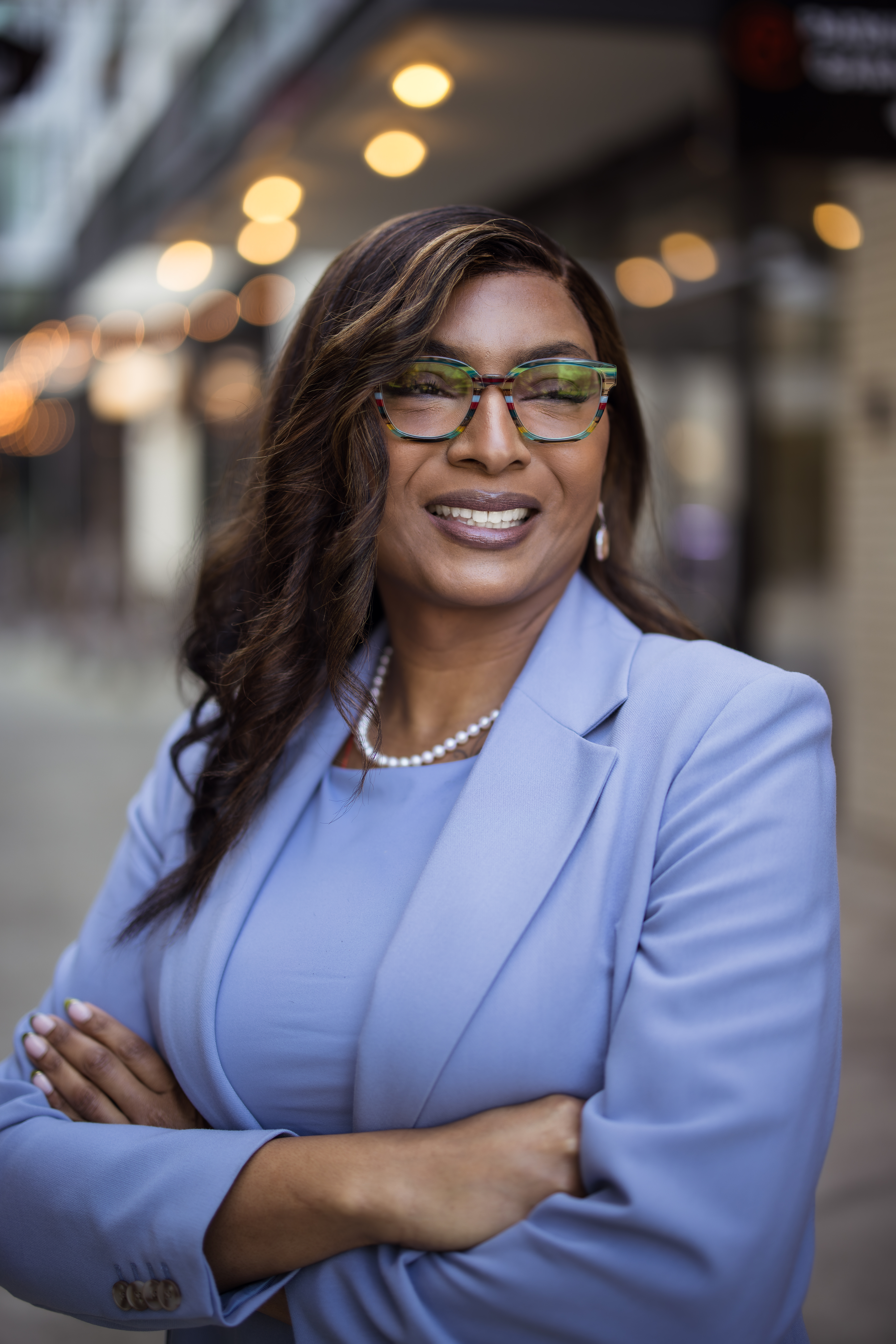

Member-elect of the Washington House of Representatives from the 37th district
- Assuming office January 2027
- Succeeding: Chipalo Street

Personal details
- Born: Jackson, Mississippi
- Party: Democratic
- Other political affiliations: Democratic Socialists of America (Note: The Democratic Socialists of America (DSA) are not a registered political party. Instead, they are a political organization for those with democratic socialist ideologies.)
- Education: Naropa University (MDiv)
- Known for: Black transgender advocacy

Jaelynn Scott is an American community organizer and politician based in Seattle, Washington. She serves as executive director of Lavender Rights Project, a Black transgender feminist advocacy organization. Scott is the member-elect of the Washington House of Representatives in the 37th district. Upon taking office, she will become the first openly transgender Black woman to hold state legislative office in the United States, as well as the first openly transgender lawmaker in the state of Washington.

== Early life and education ==
Scott grew up in Jackson, Mississippi. She graduated from high school in 1995.

Scott attended Naropa University in Boulder, Colorado.

== Pre-political career ==
Scott initially pursued a career as a flight attendant, but was laid off after the September 11 terrorist attacks.

After graduating from Naropa and being ordained in Buddhist ministry, Scott engaged in ministry work with the Unitarian Universalist Church at various locations.

She moved to Seattle in 2017, shortly after the Lavender Rights Project was founded. After making use of the organization's legal resources, she was hired by them, starting out in human resources. She became executive director of Lavender Rights Project in 2020.

== Washington House of Representatives ==
In 2026, Scott announced her campaign for state representative of the 37th district in the 2026 Washington House of Representatives election. As the incumbent did not seek reelection, the seat was contested as an open seat. Scott ran as a Democrat in the nonpartisan primary election. She advanced to the general election along with her opponent, Evon McCorkle, a college student running as an independent.

Scott was endorsed by Seattle mayor Katie Wilson.

On November 3, Scott defeated McCorkle in the general election, winning 87% of the vote.

Upon taking office, Scott will become one of two democratic socialist lawmakers in the Washington State Legislature.

== Political positions ==
Scott is a self-described democratic socialist and a member of Democratic Socialists of America.

== Personal life ==
Scott came out as transgender when she was 18 years old, and began her gender transition after moving to Seattle in 2017.

Scott began practicing Buddhism and meditation after being laid off following the September 11 attacks. She had a spiritual awakening, which led her to attend ministry school.

== Electoral history ==
=== 2026 ===
Scott ran for state representative of the 37th district in the 2026 Washington House of Representatives election. The incumbent did not seek reelection and the seat was contested as an open seat. Scott ran as a Democrat in the nonpartisan primary against her opponent, Evon McCorkle, a college student running as an independent. She won 88% of the vote.

Both candidates advanced to the general election, where Scott secured the seat with 87% of the vote.

Washington 37th State House District General Election, 2026
Party	Candidate	Votes	%
Democratic	Jaelynn Scott	36,199	87.27
Independent	Evon McCorkle	4,946	11.92
Write-in		333	0.80

== Honors and recognition ==
- 2025: Proclamation of appreciation from Seattle mayor Bruce A. Harrell and councilmember Joy Hollingsworth
- 2025: Honored by Seattle Reign FC
