= 2018 Spokane County Commissioner election =

Local election in Washington

- November 6, 2018
- Turnout: 72.88%
	Majority party	Minority party
Party	Republican	Democratic
Seats before	3	0
Popular vote	313,599	93,442
Percentage	77.00%	22.97%

The 2018 Spokane County Commissioner elections were held on November 6, 2018, following a primary election on August 7. In 2018, seats for District 2 and District 3 were up for election.

== District 2 ==
District 2
- November 6, 2018
Candidate	Mary Kuney	Rob Chase
Party	Republican	Republican
Popular vote	119,638	71,869
Percentage	62.47%	37.53%
Commissioner before election
Mary Kuney
Republican
Elected Commissioner
Mary Kuney

=== Campaign ===
Mary Kuney was appointed to the District 2 seat on August 21, 2017, following the resignation of Commissioner Shelly O’Quinn.

Kuney sought a full term in 2018. She and former Spokane County Treasurer Rob Chase, who was also a Republican, advanced to the general election.

=== Endorsements ===
Mary Kuney

Organizations

- Spokane County Republican Party

Local officials

- Cathy McMorris Rodgers, U.S. representative for Washington's 5th congressional district
Rob Chase

Organizations

- Spokane County Libertarian Party

=== Primary election results ===
2018 Spokane County Commissioner District 2, Primary Election
Primary election
Party	Candidate	Votes	%
Republican	Mary Kuney (inc.)	26,177	45.63
Republican	Rob Chase	17,842	31.12
Democratic	Ben Wick	12,323	21.49
Write-in		38	0.07

=== General election results ===
2018 Spokane County Commissioner District 2 election
Party	Candidate	Votes	%	±%
Republican	Mary Kuney	119,638	62.47%	N/A
Republican	Rob Chase	71,869	37.53%	N/A
Total votes		191,507	100.00%	N/A
Republican hold				

== District 3 ==
District 3
- November 6, 2018
Candidate	Al French	Robbi Katherine Anthony
Party	Republican	Democratic
Popular vote	122,092	93,442
Percentage	56.65%	43.35%
Commissioner before election
Al French
Republican
Elected Commissioner
Al French

=== Campaign ===
Al French was re-elected in 2014 with 54.66% of the vote. French had sought a third term in 2018 and ran against only one challenger in the election, Robbi Katherine Anthony, a technology entrepreneur and political activist. The two had advanced automatically to the general election.

=== Endorsements ===
Al French

Organizations

- Spokane County Republican Party

Local officials

- Mike Padden, state senator from the 4th district
Robbi Katherine Anthony

Organizations

- Fuse Washington

=== General election results ===
2018 Spokane County Commissioner District 3 election
Party	Candidate	Votes	%	±%
Republican	Al French	122,092	56.65%	N/A
Democratic	Robbi Katherine Anthony	93,442	43.35%	N/A
Total votes		215,534	100.00%	N/A
Republican hold				
