= Jonathan Bingle =

American politician

Member-elect of the Washington House of Representatives from the 6th district
- Assuming office January 3, 2027
- Succeeding: Jenny Graham

Member of Spokane City Council from the 1st district
- In office December 30, 2021 – January 12, 2026
- Preceded by: Kate Burke
- Succeeded by: Sarah Dixit

Personal details
- Born: December 14, 1986 (age 39) Spokane, Washington, U.S.
- Party: Republican
- Spouse: Christina Delarm
- Children: 3
- Education: Spokane Falls Community College (attended)

Jonathan Bingle (born December 14, 1986) is an American politician and pastor. A member of the Republican Party, he is the member-elect for the Washington House of Representatives' Washington's 6th legislative district (Position 2). He previously served on the Spokane City Council from 2021 to 2026.

== Early life and education ==
Bingle was born in Spokane, Washington into a deeply devout Evangelical Christian household. His parents were missionaries with his father serving as a pastor. He attended John R. Rogers High School, graduating in 2005, also briefly attending Spokane Falls Community College.

== Career ==
After college, Bingle worked at Applebee's, where he got involved in organizing trivia and entertainment events. What began as an activity connected to his employment eventually developed into his own full-fledged business: Bent Trivia, founded in 2010. He later founded Bent Events in 2012 and later Bingle Enterprises. His businesses specialized in trivia entertainment, weddings, corporate events, and event production. As of 2026, still manages the businesses with his wife.

Like his father and brother, Bingle served in his local ministry, Genesis Church, starting in 2007 as an associate pastor and later pastor.

=== Entry into politics ===
During the COVID-19 pandemic, Washington state's restrictions on public gatherings and business operations severely affected Bingle's events business. It was largely put on hold and he subsequently transitioned into contracting and construction work.

Bingle had always thought about entering politics, but originally had wanted to wait until his children were older. These shutdowns accelerated his entry, feeling that the pandemic demonstrated the need for greater representation of small-business owners in government.

In 2019, Bingle ran for mayor of Spokane, placing fourth in a field of five candidates with 6.6% of the vote.

=== Spokane City Council ===
In 2021, Bingle ran for Spokane City Council in the 1st district, an open seat after the incumbent Kate Burke, a liberal, declined to run for a second term. He faced Naghmana Sherazi, a progressive candidate, and was elected with 56% of the vote in the general, expanding the number of conservative seats and becoming one of the now two conservatives on the city council, alongside Michael Cathcart.

During his time on the council, Bingle became known for his conservative positions on public safety, homelessness, drug policy, and local government spending. He advocated for increased investment Northeast Spokane and supported housing development to residential construction. He touted bipartisan co-operation throughout his term, having a close working relationship with Nicolette Ocheltree, his legislative assistant who is a Democrat.

In June 2023, Bingle and fellow councilman Michael Cathcart passed the "Parks After Dark" ordinance, designed to address overnight safety in Spokane's parks. It established misdemeanor penalties for unauthorized presence in parks after closing and gave law enforcement additional enforcement authority. The ordinance passed 4–3.

One of Bingle's biggest accomplishments during his tenure was his work between local developers and the Spokane Low Income Housing Consortium to pass legislation in March 2023 that reformed Spokane's General Facilities Charges (GFCs), fees associated with new development. It updated fees that had not been changed in over 20 years, helped provide developers with greater predictability when planning projects, and found a balance between development costs and the financial burden on existing utility ratepayers.

He narrowly lost re-election to city council in November 2025, being defeated by progressive challenger Sarah Dixit by 163 votes.

=== U.S. House campaign ===
In 2024, Bingle announced his campaign for U.S. representative in Washington's 5th congressional district following incumbent Cathy McMorris Rodgers' retirement. He received 3.7% of the vote in the primary, later endorsing Republican frontrunner Michael Baumgartner in the general election.

=== State House campaign ===
In 2026, Bingle ran for Washington state representative from the 6th district to replace retiring incumbent Jenny Graham. He won a three-way primary with 51% of the vote between Democrat Julia Payne and Independent Aaron Croft. He later won the general election with 56% of the vote.

== Personal life ==
Bingle is married and has three children. He serves as a pastor at Genesis Church along with his brother Joshua and father Lonny.

== Electoral history ==
2019 Spokane mayoral primary election
| Candidate | Votes | % |
|---|---|---|
| Nadine Woodward | 19,366 | 40.11% |
| Ben Stuckart | 18,353 | 38.02% |
| Shawn Poole | 6,122 | 12.68% |
| Jonathan Bingle | 3,157 | 6.56% |
| Kelly P. Cruz | 1,080 | 2.24% |
| Write-in | 200 | 0.41% |
| Total votes | 48,268 | 100.00% |

2021 Spokane City Council 1st district primary election
| Candidate | Votes | % |
|---|---|---|
| Jonathan Bingle | 3,299 | 46.35% |
| Naghmana Sherazi | 1,889 | 26.54% |
| Luc Jasmin III | 1,884 | 26.47% |
| Write-in | 44 | 0.62% |
| Total votes | 7,117 | 100.00% |

2021 Spokane City Council 1st district general election
| Candidate | Votes | % |
|---|---|---|
| Jonathan Bingle | 5,624 | 56.30% |
| Naghmana Sherazi | 4,308 | 43.12% |
| Write-in | 58 | 0.58% |
| Total votes | 9,990 | 100.00% |

2024 Washington's 5th congressional district election
Primary election
| Party | Candidate | Votes | % |
|---|---|---|---|
| Republican | Michael Baumgartner | 55,859 | 27.5 |
| Democratic | Carmela Conroy | 37,227 | 18.3 |
| Republican | Jacquelin Maycumber | 27,717 | 13.6 |
| Democratic | Bernadine Bank | 24,111 | 11.9 |
| Republican | Brian Dansel | 21,983 | 10.8 |
| Democratic | Ann Marie Danimus | 11,306 | 5.6 |
| Republican | Jonathan Bingle | 7,510 | 3.7 |
| Republican | Rene Holaday | 6,180 | 3.0 |
| Republican | Rick Flynn | 4,822 | 2.4 |
| Democratic | Matthew Welde | 4,183 | 2.1 |
| Democratic | Bobbi Bennett-Wolcott | 2,336 | 1.1 |
| Write-in | | 175 | 0.1 |
| Total votes | | 203,409 | 100.0 |
General election
| Republican | Michael Baumgartner | 240,619 | 60.6 |
| Democratic | Carmela Conroy | 156,074 | 39.3 |
| Write-in | | 593 | 0.1 |
| Total votes | | 397,286 | 100.0 |

2021 Spokane City Council 1st district general election
| Candidate | Votes | % |
|---|---|---|
| Sarah Dixit | 6,306 | 50.35% |
| Jonathan Bingle (incumbent) | 6,143 | 49.05% |
| Write-in | 40 | 0.32% |
| Total votes | 12,489 | 100.00% |

Washington's 6th State House District Position 2, 2026
Primary election
| Party | Candidate | Votes | % |
|---|---|---|---|
| Republican | Jonathan Bingle | 18,651 | 50.6 |
| Democratic | Julia Payne | 9,209 | 25.0 |
| Independent Party of Washington | Aaron Croft | 8,950 | 24.3 |
| Write-in | | 74 | 0.2 |
| Total votes | | 36,884 | 100.0 |
General election
| Republican | Jonathan Bingle | | |
| Democratic | Julia Payne | | |
| Write-in | | | |
| Total votes | | | 100.0 |
