= Alan Nolan (politician) =

American politician

Member-elect of the Washington House of Representatives from the 6th district
- Assuming office January 2027
- Succeeding: Mike Volz

Personal details
- Party: Republican

Alan Nolan is an American politician. A member of the Republican Party, he is the member-elect for the 6th district of the Washington House of Representatives.
