= Andrew Engell =

American politician

Member of the Washington House of Representatives from the 7th district
- Incumbent
- Assumed office January 13, 2025 Serving with Hunter Abell
- Preceded by: Jacquelin Maycumber

Personal details
- Born: David Andrew Engell Jr. 1983 (age 42–43) United States
- Party: Republican
- Spouse: Celeste Engell
- Children: 4

Andrew Engell (born ~1983) is an American politician of the Republican Party. He is a member of the Washington House of Representatives, representing the 7th Legislative District.

== Early life and education ==
Engell grew up near Colville, Washington. He was homeschooled.

He completed the Washington AgForestry Leadership Program.

== Career ==
Engell has worked in a variety of fields including construction, welding, farming, and rental property management. He and his wife operated a certified organic vegetable farm for seven years. He previously served as the deputy district director for Congresswoman Cathy McMorris Rodgers. He also served on the State Farm Bureau Policy Development Committee. In November 2024, Engell was elected to the Washington House of Representatives, receiving 63.36% of the vote.

== Personal life ==
Engell is married to Celeste. They have four children, two boys and two girls, who are homeschooled.

== Electoral history ==
Washington's 7th State House District Position 1, 2024
Primary election
Party	Candidate	Votes	%
Republican	Andrew Engell	19,870	47.9
Republican	Soo Ing-Moody	10,485	25.3
Republican	Teagan Levine	10,278	24.8
Write-in		848	2.0
Total votes		41,481	100.0
General election
Republican	Andrew Engell	48,785	63.4
Republican	Soo Ing-Moody	27,496	35.7
Write-in		715	0.9
Total votes		76,996	100.0
