= Hunter Abell =

American politician

Member of the Washington House of Representatives from the 7th district
- Incumbent
- Assumed office January 13, 2025 Serving with Andrew Engell
- Preceded by: Joel Kretz

Personal details
- Born: Hunter Magnuson Abell United States
- Party: Republican
- Children: 2
- Education: College of William & Mary, Bachelor's, 2002; Gonzaga University School of Law, JD, 2005; Georgetown University Law Center, LL.M., 2006

Hunter Magnuson Abell is an American attorney and politician of the Republican Party. He is a member-elect of the Washington House of Representatives, representing the 7th Legislative District.

== Early life and education ==
Abell was raised on a ranch on the Colville Indian Reservation. His grandparents moved to NE Washington in the 1950s. He still lives on his family's fourth-generation ranch.

He earned a bachelor's degree from the College of William & Mary in 2002. He received a JD from Gonzaga University School of Law in 2005, and a Master of Laws degree from Georgetown University Law Center in 2006.

== Career ==
Abell has served in the military, both as an enlisted member and as an officer. He has been deployed twice, to Iraq and Guantanamo Bay. He has previously served as a liaison officer in the Central Criminal Court of Iraq in Baghdad, as well as a JAG officer with the U.S. Navy. Currently, he is a commander in the U.S. Navy Reserve.

He is an attorney and a member at Williams Kastner. He has served as the president of the Washington State Bar Association since 2023. He previously served as judge of the Ferry County District Court.

He previously worked as an adjunct faculty member for Brandman University.

In November 2024, Abell was elected to the Washington House of Representatives, receiving 70.72% of the vote.

== Personal life ==
Abell is the father of two daughters. He is divorced.

He resides in Colville, Washington.

== Electoral history ==
Washington's 7th State House District Position 2, 2024
Primary election
Party	Candidate	Votes	%
Republican	Hunter Abell	15,749	34.8
Democratic	Paul "Rocky" Dean	12,777	27.1
Republican	Pat Bell	10,967	24.2
Republican	Ronald L. McCoy	6,179	13.7
Write-in		95	0.2
Total votes		45,267	100.0
General election
Republican	Hunter Abell	58,071	70.7
Democratic	Paul "Rocky" Dean	23,929	29.1
Write-in		119	0.1
Total votes		82,119	100.0
