= Mike Volz =

American politician

Treasurer of Spokane County
- Incumbent
- Assumed office January 3, 2025
- Preceded by: Michael Baumgartner

Member of the Washington House of Representatives from the 6th district
- Incumbent
- Assumed office January 9, 2017 Serving with Jenny Graham
- Preceded by: Kevin Parker
- Succeeded by: Alan Nolan (elect)

Personal details
- Born: James Michael Volz; 1964 or 1965 (age 61–62)
- Party: Republican
- Spouse: Diane
- Children: 3
- Education: Eastern Washington University (BA); Gonzaga University (MBA)
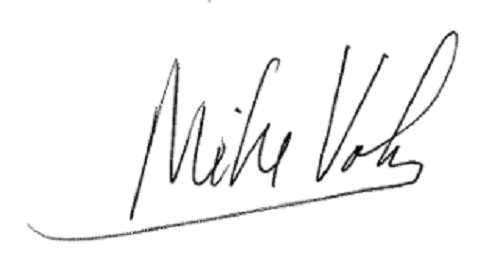
- Signature
- Website: mikevolz.houserepublicans.wa.gov

James Michael Volz (born 1964 or 1965) is an American politician of the Republican Party. He is a member of the Washington House of Representatives, representing the 6th Legislative District since 2017.

== Early life, education, and career ==
Volz graduated from Ritzville High School and earned a bachelor's degree from Eastern Washington University. He later received an MBA from Gonzaga University.

Volz served as the assistant finance director for the Spokane Transit Authority before becoming the Deputy Treasurer for Spokane County. He also serves as an adjunct faculty member at Whitworth University.

== Washington House of Representatives ==
Volz ran for the House seat following the announcement of the retirement of Representative Kevin Parker, along with two other Republicans. Volz defeated Democrat Lynnette Vehrs in the general election in 2016.
