= Washington's 33rd legislative district =

American legislative district

Coordinates: 47°24′N 122°15′W

Map of Washington's 33rd legislative district

Washington's 33rd legislative district is one of forty-nine districts in Washington for representation in the state legislature.

It is in King County and consists of east Burien, Normandy Park, SeaTac, Des Moines and parts of Kent, Tukwila, and Renton.

The district is represented by three Democrats: Tina Orwall (Senate), Edwin Obras (House, position 1), and Mia Gregerson (House, position 2).

== See also ==
- Washington Redistricting Commission
- Washington State Legislature
- Washington State Senate
- Washington House of Representatives
