= Fuse Washington =

American political advocacy organization

- Formation: 2007
- Founder: Aaron Ostrom
- Type: 501(c)(4) nonprofit organization
- Headquarters: Seattle, Washington
- Region served: Washington (state), United States
- Executive director: Aaron Ostrom
- Staff: 14
- Website: https://fusewashington.org/

Fuse Washington is a progressive advocacy organization in Washington state. It is a member of the ProgressNow network. Fuse, a 501(c)(4) organization, along with its sister organization the Fuse Innovation Fund, a 501(c)(3) organization, claims to be the state's largest progressive organization because of its email list of more than 100,000 people.

== History and mission ==
Fuse was launched in 2007 by executive director Aaron Ostrom. Since then, the organization has grown to a staff of 14 with a ten-member board of directors.

Like other ProgressNow organizations, Fuse uses e-mail campaigns and grassroots organizing to inform its subscribers about local politics and lobby elected officials. Fuse focuses primarily on campaigns involving climate change, racial justice, tax reform, political accountability, and workers rights.

== Voters guide ==
=== Washington ===
Fuse started their Progressive Voters Guide in 2008 as an online elections guide to races and initiatives in Washington state. The guide includes the endorsements and voting recommendations of many progressive organizations. Fuse's current partners include Washington Conservation Voters, Planned Parenthood Alliance Advocates, the Washington State Labor Council, The Stranger, UFCW Local 3000, and Unite Here.

=== National expansion ===
Fuse worked with Progress Virginia to expand their guide to Virginia for the 2019 elections. ProgressNow Colorado used Fuse's site to create a guide in 2020, along with California, Michigan, Pennsylvania, Virginia, and Wisconsin. In 2022, Fuse added an eighth state, Arizona, to their voters guide website.

== Electoral edvocacy ==
=== 2022 elections ===
Fuse Washington and its affiliated federal Super PAC, Together for Progress, and state PAC, Fuse Votes, combined spent more than $1.5 million in the 2022 election. More than half of that spending was focused on the race in Washington's 3rd Congressional District and another 30% was focused on Washington's 8th Congressional District. Fuse ran ads in which they described Republicans Joe Kent and Matt Larkin as extreme and opposed to abortion. Fuse's work in the 3rd district received more attention after Democrat Marie Gluesenkamp Perez won her election by less than 1 percent. This was considered a significant upset in a district that had "relative absence of spending from national Democrats."

=== 2018 elections ===
Fuse attended a fundraiser for Cathy McMorris Rodgers and recorded comments by Republican Representative Devin Nunes that received widespread attention after being aired on The Rachel Maddow Show. In his remarks, Nunes said that Republican leaders in the U.S. House had delayed impeaching then Deputy Attorney General Rod Rosenstein because it would have delayed the Senate's confirmation of Judge Brett Kavanaugh to the U.S. Supreme Court. Nunes also said that a Republican majority in Congress was necessary to protect President Donald Trump from investigations.

=== 2012 elections ===
==== 1st Congressional District ====
Less than a week before Election Day, Fuse released video footage in which Republican congressional candidate John Koster said he opposes abortion even in cases involving rape. The video, taken by a Fuse activist at an Everett, Washington fundraiser for Koster, quickly attracted national and international attention. Critics in the media likened Koster's comments to other controversial remarks on rape by Republican Senate candidates Todd Akin and Richard Mourdock. Koster was defeated by Democratic opponent Suzan DelBene one week after the clip was posted. Koster conceded the comments may have affected the race's outcome in one of Washington's most competitive districts.

=== 2011 elections ===
==== Bellevue City Council ====
Fuse played a major role in an independent expenditure campaign to support pro-light rail candidates Claudia Balducci and John Stokes for City Council in Bellevue. Fuse set up a political committee called Eastside Progress to coordinate a series of direct mail pieces with Washington Conservation Voters, the Cascade Bicycle Club, and the Bellevue firefighters, which spent approximately $30,000. The independent expenditure campaign pit Fuse and its allies against Kemper Freeman and two other prominent Bellevue developers who contributed $69,000 to their political committee in support of Aaron Laing, Stokes' opponent. Late in the campaign, Fuse organized a protest in Bellevue against what it called negative mail pieces against Balducci and Stokes. The protest garnered a counter-protest by members of the group Build A Better Bellevue, which has opposed Sound Transit's light rail plans for Bellevue, and the King County Republican Party.

Balducci won re-election with more than 65% of the vote, but the race between Stokes and Laing was very close. Stokes led after the initial count by only 51 votes out of 35,000 cast, which was a narrow enough margin to trigger a manual recount. The hand recount confirmed Stokes' victory and increased his margin to 54 votes.

==== Spokane Mayor ====
Shortly before the 2011 general election, Fuse's Spokane Organizer Tanya Rioridan filed a complaint against Spokane mayoral challenger David Condon with the Washington State Public Disclosure Commission. The complaint accused Condon of skirting campaign finance laws by funneling money through the Washington State Republican Party. As reported by The Pacific Northwest Inlander, "Five donors to Condon's campaign — who had already given the maximum donation to him — gave an accumulated $25,000 to the state party over the course of three days in October, which the state GOP, in turn, handed right back to Condon, the citizens group says." Despite the allegations, Condon went on to defeat incumbent Mary Verner win the Mayor's race by nearly 3,000 votes.

=== 2010 elections ===
==== 34th District Legislative Election ====
Fuse was one of the first organizations to endorse Joe Fitzgibbon for the Washington House of Representatives in the 34th Legislative District. It quickly became a contentious primary between four candidates in the Democratic-leaning district and continued into the general election. Two labor unions and Fuse accused Fitzgibbon's general election opponent, Mike Heavey, of giving conflicting answers on candidate questionnaires. These accusations devolved into a back-and-forth about Heavey's credibility and economic credentials several days before ballots were mailed. Fitzgibbon went on to win the election with 56.5% of the vote.

==== State Supreme Court ====
Fuse was an early opponent of State Supreme Court justices Richard B. Sanders and Jim Johnson The organization was particularly active in trying to defeat Johnson, who Fuse Executive Director Aaron Ostrom called an "ultraconservative legislator who is legislating from the bench." Sanders was narrowly defeated by Bainbridge Island attorney and legal ethics specialist Charlie Wiggins, while Johnson won his primary election and was unopposed in the general election.

==== Campaign finance research ====
Less than two weeks before Election Day, Fuse broke the news that Republican candidate for United States Senate Dino Rossi received $4.5 million in support from outside groups that did not disclose their donors, the most of any candidate in the country. In the final days of the campaign, Rossi's total support from groups with undisclosed donors increased to nearly $7 million. In addition, Fuse reported that Jaime Herrera Beutler received $934,599 in her successful race for Congress in Washington's 3rd congressional district.

== Other activities ==
=== Support of the Affordable Care Act ===
In 2017, Fuse was active in [Protests against Donald Trump] in Washington state, with a focus on defending the Affordable Care Act. In February, They helped organize a protest outside the office of Rep. Cathy McMorris Rodgers and a march with hundreds of attendees outside the office of Rep. Dave Reichert. In addition, Fuse hosted a town hall with 800 attendees for Rep. McMorris Rodgers that she did not attend. Over the summer, Fuse organized protest outside a fundraiser she held in Bellevue, Washington and outside a town hall event she hosted with limited seating.

=== Opposing coal mining in King County ===
In 2014, Fuse obtained a letter from the Pacific Coast Coal Company to Black Diamond residents detailing plans to reopen the John Henry No. 1 Mine, which had been closed since the mid-1990s. The organization claimed that more than 1,400 people had submitted comments through them in opposition to the mine. Fuse continued working against the project in 2017 when the federal regulator overseeing the mine found that it would have no significant impact on the environment, a finding which Fuse disagreed with

=== Amazon and ALEC ===
On May 24, 2012, Fuse and fellow progressive organizations Color of Change, CREDO Mobile, People for the American Way, Progressive Change Campaign Committee, and SumofUs, delivered a petition with more than 500,000 signatures asking online-retailer Amazon.com to cut ties with the conservative American Legislative Exchange Council (ALEC). At an Amazon shareholder meeting the same day, Amazon General Council Michelle Wilson announced Amazon would not renew its membership in ALEC citing “public concerns.” Fuse spokesperson Collin Jergens commended Amazon's decision saying, “We are happy Amazon.com has decided to sever ties with the shadowy corporate front that is ALEC: Legislators' job is to represent voters, not be guided by the interests of giant corporations."

=== Opposition to Rodney Tom ===
After Democratic State Senators Tim Sheldon and Rodney Tom announced in December 2012 that they would caucus with Senate Republicans in the upcoming legislative session, Fuse launched King Tom Watch – a satirical website intended to lampoon Tom for his role in creating a Republican-led majority in the Washington Senate. On January 31, 2013, Fuse members gathered outside the Washington State Capitol and presented Tom with a portrait depicting the majority leader as a monarch.

Fuse publicly criticized Tom for supporting legislation to repeal the state's Family and Medical Leave Act and co-sponsoring a bill to undercut the minimum wage by instituting a temporary "training wage" for new workers. In an effort to attract attention to the “training wage,” Fuse organized a press conference during which House Democrats Mike Sells, Timm Ormsby, Sherry Appleton, and Laurie Jinkins introduced legislation to establish a “training wage” for freshmen legislators.

=== Opposition to Rob McKenna ===
Fuse was an early opponent of Washington State Attorney General and gubernatorial candidate Rob McKenna. Shortly after McKenna announced that he was participating in a lawsuit to overturn the Patient Protection and Affordable Care Act, Fuse collected and delivered petitions from 36,000 people urging McKenna to drop the lawsuit. Since then, Fuse has continued to criticize McKenna's participation in the lawsuit because they believe his efforts would "allow big insurance companies to deny coverage to sick patients, increase the cost of prescriptions for seniors, and make it harder for small businesses to provide health care coverage for their workers.” In an effort to stop McKenna's challenge, Fuse supported a lawsuit filed by Seattle lawyer Knoll Lowney that alleged McKenna's challenge to the Affordable Care Act was an unethical attack on women's health care options.

In addition, Fuse prominently criticized McKenna's refusal to represent Commissioner of Public Lands Peter J. Goldmark in a lawsuit against the Okanogan County Public Utility District. Fuse has also been cited as a source for opposition research about McKenna's campaign finance disclosures and fact-checking McKenna's public statements.

=== Sizzle Fizzle Awards ===
Fuse's Sizzle and Fizzle awards are awarded to the political figures Fuse states has done the best and worst job in the previous year.

==== 2012 Awards ====
In 2012, Fuse awarded Attorney General and Republican gubernatorial candidate Rob McKenna a Fizzle award for his on-going effort to overturn the Patient Protection and Affordable Care Act. Additional Fizzle awards were given to State Representative Mark Hargrove for comparing same-sex marriage to a person marrying bacon and Senator Don Benton “for putting the interests of Wall Street ahead of his constituents.”

Fuse's 2012 Sizzle awards were given to State Representatives Hans Dunshee, Phyllis Gutierrez Kenney, Jamie Pedersen, and Luis Moscoso, State Senators Derek Kilmer, Frank Chopp, and Lisa Brown, and the Washington State Budget and Policy Center.

==== 2011 Awards ====
In 2011, Fuse gave a Fizzle award to Governor Christine Gregoire for "conceding the political landscape to Tim Eyman and conservative business interests", along with State Senator Jim Kastama and Bellevue City Councilmember Kevin Wallace. Winners of its 2011 Sizzle awards included state Representative Laurie Jinkins of Tacoma for being a "vocal champion for legislation to fund K-3 education by finally ending tax breaks for Wall Street Banks," as well as Chris Reykdal of Tumwater.
