= Emily Alvarado (politician) =

American politician

Member of the Washington State Senate from the 34th district
- Incumbent
- Assumed office January 21, 2025
- Preceded by: Joe Nguyen

Member of the Washington House of Representatives from the 34th district
- In office January 9, 2023 – January 21, 2025
- Preceded by: Eileen Cody
- Succeeded by: Brianna Thomas

Personal details
- Party: Democratic
- Education: Scripps College (BA); University of Washington (JD)

Emily Alvarado is an American politician and affordable housing advocate serving as a member of the Washington State Senate for the 34th district since 2025. She previously represented the same district in the Washington House of Representatives from 2023 to 2025.

== Education ==
Alvarado earned a Bachelor of Arts degree in American studies from Scripps College in 2005 and a Juris Doctor from the University of Washington School of Law.

== Career ==
From 2004 to 2006, Alvarado worked as a public affairs field organizer for Planned Parenthood of Southwestern Oregon. From 2009 to 2011, she was an advocacy project coordinator for the Housing Consortium of Everett & Snohomish County. From 2011 to 2013, she was the policy director of the Housing Development Consortium of Seattle–King County.

Alvarado joined the Seattle Office of Housing in 2014 as manager of policy and equitable development and became director in 2019. Since 2021, she has worked as a vice president of Enterprise Community Partners. Alvarado was elected to the Washington House of Representatives in November 2022. She was appointed to the State Senate in January 2025.
