= Washington's 34th legislative district =

American legislative district

Coordinates: 47.48°N 122.41°W

Map of Washington's 34th legislative district

Washington's 34th legislative district is one of forty-nine districts in Washington state for representation in the state legislature.

It covers all of Vashon as well as West Seattle, White Center, and west Burien.

The district's legislators are state senator Emily Alvarado and state representatives Brianna Thomas (position 1) and Joe Fitzgibbon (position 2), all Democrats.

== See also ==
- Washington Redistricting Commission
- Washington State Legislature
- Washington State Senate
- Washington House of Representatives
