= Jenny Graham (politician) =

American politician from Washington

Member of the Washington House of Representatives from the 6th district
- Incumbent
- Assumed office January 14, 2019 Serving with Mike Volz
- Preceded by: Jeff Holy

Personal details
- Born: Virginia C. Estes; 1965 Long Beach, California, U.S.
- Party: Republican
- Education: Thomas Jefferson High School
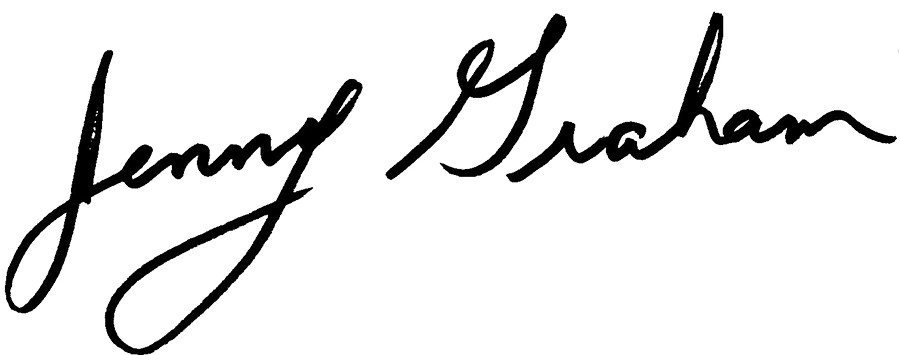
- Signature

Virginia C. "Jenny" Graham (née Estes, born 1965) is an American businesswoman and politician serving in the Washington State House of Representatives for Washington's 6th legislative district, having first won the seat in the 2018 elections. She was re-elected in 2020 and 2022.

Graham's "advocacy for victims of human trafficking and abuse" is informed by personal tragedy, the murder of her sister by the Green River Killer. She also supports the death penalty due to this event. She lobbied for House Bill 1352 which extended the statute of limitations on "child molesters until the victim turns 30".

After an Inlander reporter wrote about her linking to conspiracy websites on Facebook in 2020, Graham called him a "cocksucker," a "lying piece of shit," "disgusting," "hateful" "sleazy" and accused him of an "attack on human trafficking victims."
