= Brianna Thomas (politician) =

American politician

Member of the Washington House of Representatives from the 34th district
- Incumbent
- Assumed office January 21, 2025 Serving with Joe Fitzgibbon
- Preceded by: Emily Alvarado

Personal details
- Party: Democrat

Brianna Thomas is a member of the Washington House of Representatives for the 34th district. She took office on January 21, 2025, after being appointed by the King County Council to fill Emily Alvarado's former seat.
