= Mia Gregerson =

American politician (born 1972)

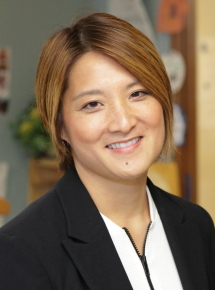
- Gregerson in 2014

Member of the Washington House of Representatives from the 33rd district
- Incumbent
- Assumed office December 16, 2013 Serving with Edwin Obras
- Preceded by: Dave Upthegrove

Member of the SeaTac City Council Position 7
- In office January 1, 2008 – January 1, 2016
- Preceded by: Don DeHan
- Succeeded by: Erin Sitterley

Personal details
- Born: December 19, 1972 (age 53) Taipei, Taiwan
- Party: Democratic
- Spouse: Scott Dahle
- Education: Highline Community College (AA); University of Washington (BA)
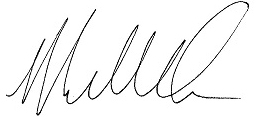
- Signature
- Website: Official

Mia Su-Ling Gregerson-Dahle (born December 19, 1972) is an American politician. A Democrat, Gregerson has served as a member of the Washington House of Representatives from the 33rd Legislative District since 2013. She served on the SeaTac city council from 2008 to 2016.

== Early life and education ==
Gregerson was born in Taiwan. She was adopted by a United States Air Force couple and moved to the United States. She attended Highline Community College and the University of Washington, earning a degree in history. Professionally, Gregerson has worked as a surgical assistant and as a business manager in the dental industry.

== Career ==
=== SeaTac city council ===
In 2007, Gregerson was elected to the SeaTac city council. In 2011, Gregerson held onto her seat on the council by a 31-vote margin against Republican Erin Sitterley.

In a 2015 re-match, Gregerson lost her re-election campaign for SeaTac City Council Position 7 with 40.90% of the votes (1512 votes). Her opponent Erin Sitterley won with 58.70% (2170 votes).

=== Washington House of Representatives ===
Gregerson was appointed to the state legislature on December 16, 2013, as the preferred candidate of the King County Council, one of three recommended by the 33rd Legislative District Democratic Precinct Committee Officers. Gregerson filled the vacancy left after Dave Upthegrove resigned from his seat in the legislature on December 16, 2013, following his election to the King County Council.

In 2023, Gregerson introduced the Fair Repair Act, a digital right to repair bill. The legislation passed the state house in March 2023. Gregerson was elected to lead the House Members of Color Caucus. Gregerson cosponsored legislation that would legalize the building of accessory dwelling units (ADU) in urban growth areas to alleviate the state's housing shortage.

Additionally, in 2023, Gregerson introduced State House Bill 1784, which proposed an additional $28 million in food assistance following the February expiration of SNAP. The bill passed unanimously.

In 2025, Gregerson, along with Rep. Timm Ormsby (D-Spokane), sponsored House Bill 1475 proposing to cut the bonuses for certified Washington state teachers.
