= Edwin Obras =

Member of the Washington House of Representatives from the 33rd district
- Incumbent
- Assumed office December 10, 2024 Serving with Mia Gregerson
- Preceded by: Tina Orwall

Personal details
- Born: Edwin Carbonell Obras; August 5, 1971 (age 54) Republic of the Philippines
- Party: Democratic
- Children: 1
- Education: University of Washington, BA; Northeastern University, Graduate Certificate (2015); MPA (2016)

Edwin Carbonell Obras (born August 5, 1971) is an American politician serving in the Washington House of Representatives, representing the 33rd Legislative District.

== Early life and education ==
Obras was born in the Philippines. He grew up on Beacon Hill in Seattle.

He graduated from the University of Washington with a BA in American Ethnic Studies. He received a Graduate Certificate in Non-Profit, Philanthropy and Social Change (2015), as well as a Master of Public Administration (2016), from Northeastern University.

== Career ==
Obras has worked for the City of Seattle's Human Services Department for over 15 years, most recently as deputy division director.

He has served as board president of the Filipino Community of Seattle (FCS) since 2019.

On December 10, 2024, Obras was appointed to the Washington House of Representatives.
