= Chipalo Street =

American politician and software engineer

Member of the Washington House of Representatives from the 37th district
- Incumbent
- Assumed office January 9, 2023 Serving with Sharon Tomiko Santos
- Preceded by: Kirsten Harris-Talley

Personal details
- Party: Democratic
- Education: Brown University (BAS, MS)

Chipalo Street is an American politician and software engineer serving as a member of the Washington House of Representatives for the 37th district. Elected in November 2022, he assumed office on January 9, 2023.

== Education ==
He earned a Bachelor of Applied Science and Master of Science in computer science from Brown University.

== Career ==
After earning his master's degree, Street returned to Seattle and began working at Microsoft on the Windows Presentation Foundation (WPF) team. Street later contributed to Microsoft Silverlight, the Extensible Application Markup Language, and Microsoft Azure. Since 2021, he has been a principal program manager in the office of CTO Kevin Scott. Street is a former professional soccer referee.
