= 2024 Washington House of Representatives election =

2024 Washington House of Representatives elections
- November 5, 2024

All 98 seats in the Washington House of Representatives 50 seats needed for a majority
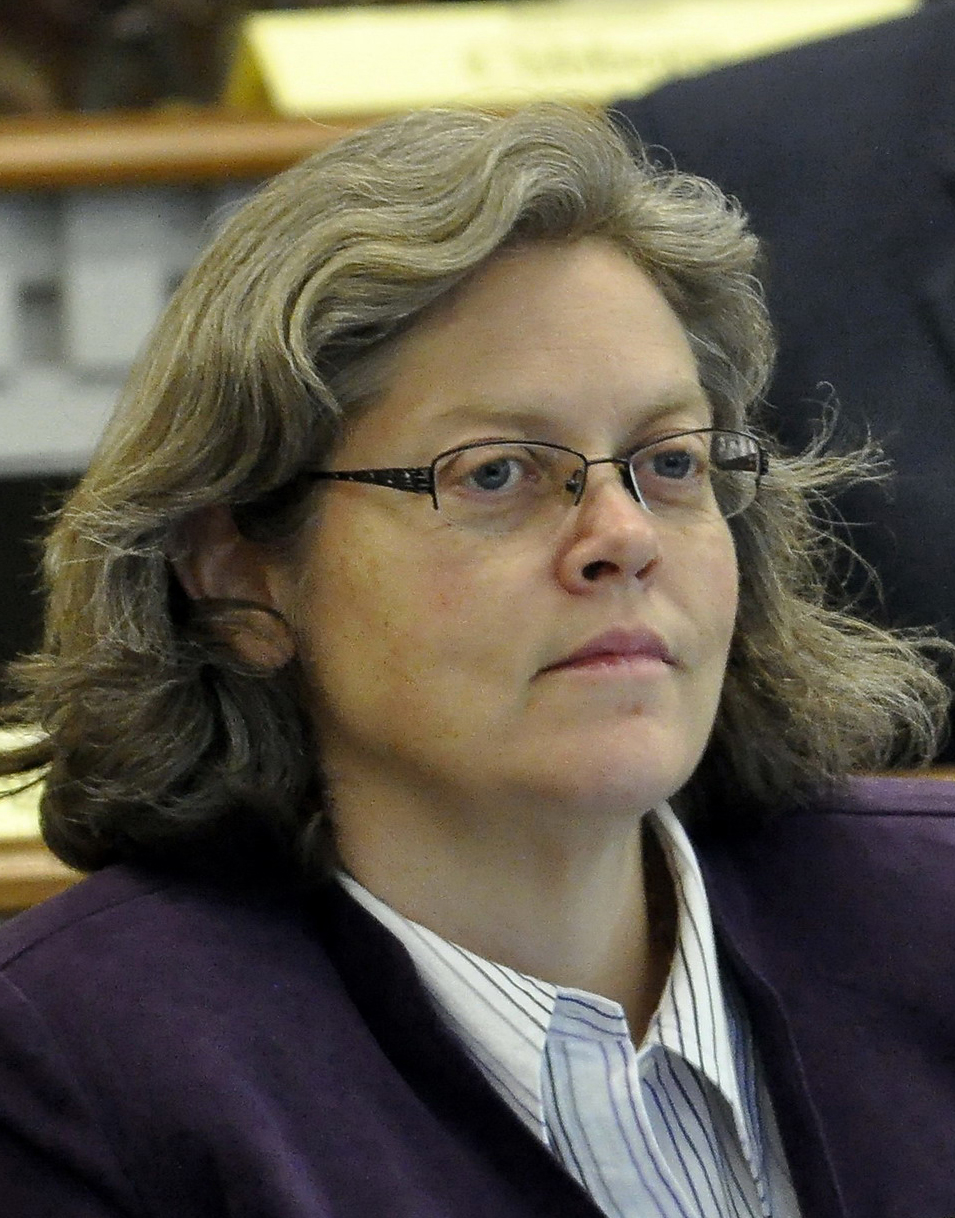

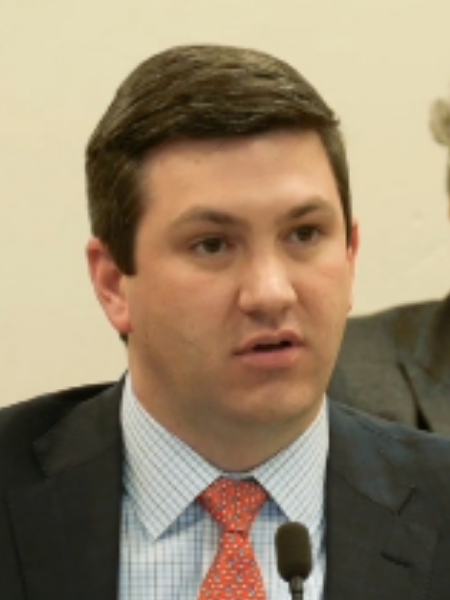
	Majority party	Minority party
Leader	Laurie Jinkins	Drew Stokesbary
Party	Democratic	Republican
Leader's seat	27th	31st
Last election	58	40
Seats won	59	39
Seat change	▲1	▼1
Popular vote	3,782,471	3,011,190
Percentage	54.04%	43.02%
Swing	▲2.03%	▼2.75%
- Results: Democratic gain Democratic hold Republican hold
Speaker of the House before election
Laurie Jinkins
Democratic
Elected Speaker of the House
Laurie Jinkins
Democratic

The 2024 Washington House of Representatives election was held on November 5, 2024, alongside the 2024 United States elections, to elect representatives from all 98 legislative districts to the Washington House of Representatives. Primary elections were held on August 6, 2024. Washington uses a jungle primary system and the candidates with the two highest vote counts proceed to the general election.

== Partisan background ==
In the 2020 presidential election, Democrat Joe Biden won 34 of Washington State's legislative districts while Republican Donald Trump won 15. Going into the 2024 election, Republicans hold 10 House of Representatives seats in 5 different districts that Joe Biden won in 2020: district 12 (Biden +3); majority-minority district 14 (Biden +14); district 17 (Biden +6); district 25 (Biden +2); and district 26 (Biden +6).

Biden 40–50% 50–60% 60–70% 70–80% 80–90% 90–100% / Trump 40–50% 50–60% 60–70%

== Background ==
=== Soto Palmer v. Hobbs ===
In August of 2023, Judge Robert S. Lasnik of the United States District Court for the Western District of Washington ruled that the 15th legislative district violated the Voting Rights Act by diluting Latino votes in the Yakima Valley region and necessitated redrawing.

Plaintiffs provided five remedial maps awaiting Lasnik's approval. On March 15, 2024, the judge selected a new redistricting map which made significant changes to the boundaries of several districts in the Yakima Valley, especially districts 8, 13, 14, 15, and 16.

== Retirements ==
Eighteen incumbents did not seek re-election with an additional incumbent seeking election in a different seat in the house.

=== Democrats ===
1. District 3, Position 1: Marcus Riccelli is retiring to run for State Senate.
2. District 5, Position 1: Bill Ramos is retiring to run for State Senate.
3. District 22, Position 2: Jessica Bateman is retiring to run for State Senate.
4. District 24, Position 1: Mike Chapman is retiring to run for State Senate.
5. District 43, Position 2: Frank Chopp is retiring.

=== Republicans ===
1. District 2, Position 2: J. T. Wilcox is retiring.
2. District 4, Position 2: Leonard Christian is retiring to run for State Senate.
3. District 7, Position 1: Jacquelin Maycumber is retiring to run for U.S. House.
4. District 7, Position 2: Joel Kretz is retiring.
5. District 12, Position 1: Keith Goehner is retiring to run for State Senate.
6. District 14, Position 2: Gina Mosbrucker is retiring.
7. District 15, Position 1: Bruce Chandler is retiring.
8. District 15, Position 2: Bryan Sandlin is retiring.
9. District 17, Position 2: Paul Harris is retiring to run for State Senate.
10. District 18, Position 2: Greg Cheney is retiring to run for State Senate.
11. District 25, Position 1: Kelly Chambers is retiring to run for Pierce County Executive.
12. District 26, Position 1: Spencer Hutchins is retiring.
13. District 31, Position 2: Eric Robertson is retiring.

=== Incumbents Running in a New District ===
1. District 14, Position 1: Chris Corry is running in the 15th District.

== Predictions ==
Source	Ranking	As of
Sabato's Crystal Ball	Likely D	October 23, 2024

== Summary of results by district ==
District	Posi	Incumbent	Party	Elected Representative	Outcome
1st	1	Davina Duerr	Dem	Davina Duerr	Dem
1st	2	Shelley Kloba	Dem	Shelley Kloba	Dem
2nd	1	Andrew Barkis	Rep	Andrew Barkis	Rep
2nd	2	J. T. Wilcox†	Rep	Matt Marshall	Rep
3rd	1	Marcus Riccelli†	Dem	Natasha Hill	Dem
3rd	2	Timm Ormsby	Dem	Timm Ormsby	Dem
4th	1	Suzanne Schmidt	Rep	Suzanne Schmidt	Rep
4th	2	Leonard Christian†	Rep	Rob Chase	Rep
5th	1	Bill Ramos†	Dem	Victoria Hunt	Dem
5th	2	Lisa Callan	Dem	Lisa Callan	Dem
6th	1	Mike Volz	Rep	Mike Volz	Rep
6th	2	Jenny Graham	Rep	Jenny Graham	Rep
7th	1	Jacquelin Mycumber†	Rep	Andrew Engell	Rep
7th	2	Joel Kretz†	Rep	Hunter Abell	Rep
8th	1	Stephanie Barnard	Rep	Stephanie Barnard	Rep
8th	2	April Connors	Rep	April Connors	Rep
9th	1	Mary Dye	Rep	Mary Dye	Rep
9th	2	Joe Schmick	Rep	Joe Schmick	Rep
10th	1	Clyde Shavers	Dem	Clyde Shavers	Dem
10th	2	Dave Paul	Dem	Dave Paul	Dem
11th	1	David Hackney	Dem	David Hackney	Dem
11th	2	Steve Bergquist	Dem	Steve Bergquist	Dem
12th	1	Keith Goehner†	Rep	Brian Burnett	Rep
12th	2	Mike Steele	Rep	Mike Steele	Rep
13th	1	Tom Dent	Rep	Tom Dent	Rep
13th	2	Alex Ybarra	Rep	Alex Ybarra	Rep
14th	1	Chris Corry†	Rep	Gloria Mendoza	Rep
14th	2	Gina Mosbrucker†	Rep	Deb Manjarrez	Rep
15th	1	Bruce Chandler†	Rep	Chris Corry	Rep
15th	2	Bryan Sandlin†	Rep	Jeremie Dufault	Rep
16th	1	Mark Klicker	Rep	Mark Klicker	Rep
16th	2	Skyler Rude	Rep	Skyler Rude	Rep
17th	1	Kevin Waters	Rep	Kevin Waters	Rep
17th	2	Paul Harris†	Rep	David Stuebe	Rep
18th	1	Stephanie McClintock	Rep	Stephanie McClintock	Rep
18th	2	Greg Cheney†	Rep	John Ley	Rep
19th	1	Jim Walsh	Rep	Jim Walsh	Rep
19th	2	Joel McEntire	Rep	Joel McEntire	Rep
20th	1	Peter Abbarno	Rep	Peter Abbarno	Rep
20th	2	Ed Orcutt	Rep	Ed Orcutt	Rep
21st	1	Strom Peterson	Dem	Strom Peterson	Dem
21st	2	Lillian Ortiz-Self	Dem	Lillian Ortiz-Self	Dem
22nd	1	Beth Doglio	Dem	Beth Doglio	Dem
22nd	2	Jessica Bateman†	Dem	Lisa Parshley	Dem
23rd	1	Tarra Simmons	Dem	Tarra Simmons	Dem
23rd	2	Greg Nance	Dem	Greg Nance	Dem
24th	1	Mike Chapman†	Dem	Adam Bernbaum	Dem
24th	2	Steve Tharinger	Dem	Steve Tharinger	Dem
25th	1	Kelly Chambers†	Rep	Michael Keaton	Rep
25th	2	Cyndy Jacobsen	Rep	Cyndy Jacobsen	Rep
26th	1	Spencer Hutchins†	Rep	Adison Richards	Dem
26th	2	Michelle Caldier Valdez	Rep	Michelle Caldier Valdez	Rep
27th	1	Laurie Jinkins	Dem	Laurie Jinkins	Dem
27th	2	Jake Fey	Dem	Jake Fey	Dem
28th	1	Mari Leavitt	Dem	Mari Leavitt	Dem
28th	2	Dan Bronoske	Dem	Dan Bronoske	Dem
29th	1	Melanie Morgan	Dem	Melanie Morgan	Dem
29th	2	Sharlett Mena	Dem	Sharlett Mena	Dem
30th	1	Jamila Taylor	Dem	Jamila Taylor	Dem
30th	2	Kristine Reeves	Dem	Kristine Reeves	Dem
31st	1	Drew Stokesbary	Rep	Drew Stokesbary	Rep
31st	2	Eric Robertson†	Rep	Josh Penner	Rep
32nd	1	Cindy Ryu	Dem	Cindy Ryu	Dem
32nd	2	Lauren Davis	Dem	Lauren Davis	Dem
33rd	1	Tina Orwall	Dem	Tina Orwall	Dem
33rd	2	Mia Gregerson	Dem	Mia Gregerson	Dem
34th	1	Emily Alvarado	Dem	Emily Alvarado	Dem
34th	2	Joe Fitzgibbon	Dem	Joe Fitzgibbon	Dem
35th	1	Dan Griffey	Rep	Dan Griffey	Rep
35th	2	Travis Couture	Rep	Travis Couture	Rep
36th	1	Julia Reed	Dem	Julia Reed	Dem
36th	2	Liz Berry	Dem	Liz Berry	Dem
37th	1	Sharon Tomiko Santos	Dem	Sharon Tomiko Santos	Dem
37th	2	Chipalo Street	Dem	Chipalo Street	Dem
38th	1	Julio Cortes	Dem	Julio Cortes	Dem
38th	2	Mary Fosse	Dem	Mary Fosse	Dem
39th	1	Sam Low	Rep	Sam Low	Rep
39th	2	Carolyn Eslick	Rep	Carolyn Eslick	Rep
40th	1	Debra Lekanoff	Dem	Debra Lekanoff	Dem
40th	2	Alex Ramel	Dem	Alex Ramel	Dem
41st	1	Tana Senn	Dem	Tana Senn	Dem
41st	2	My-Linh Thai	Dem	My-Linh Thai	Dem
42nd	1	Alicia Rule	Dem	Alicia Rule	Dem
42nd	2	Joe Timmons	Dem	Joe Timmons	Dem
43rd	1	Nicole Macri	Dem	Nicole Macri	Dem
43rd	2	Frank Chopp†	Dem	Shaun Scott	Dem
44th	1	Brandy Donaghy	Dem	Brandy Donaghy	Dem
44th	2	April Berg	Dem	April Berg	Dem
45th	1	Roger Goodman	Dem	Roger Goodman	Dem
45th	2	Larry Springer	Dem	Larry Springer	Dem
46th	1	Gerry Pollet	Dem	Gerry Pollet	Dem
46th	2	Darya Farivar	Dem	Darya Farivar	Dem
47th	1	Debra Entenman	Dem	Debra Entenman	Dem
47th	2	Chris Stearns	Dem	Chris Stearns	Dem
48th	1	Vandana Slatter	Dem	Vandana Slatter	Dem
48th	2	Amy Walen	Dem	Amy Walen	Dem
49th	1	Sharon Wylie	Dem	Sharon Wylie	Dem
49th	2	Monica Stonier	Dem	Monica Stonier	Dem

== District 1 ==
=== Position 1 ===
==== Candidates ====
- Mark Davies (Republican)
- Davina Duerr (Democratic), incumbent state representative

==== Results ====
Washington's 1st State House District Position 1, 2024
Primary election
Party	Candidate	Votes	%
Democratic	Davina Duerr (incumbent)	29,207	71.9
Republican	Mark Davies	11,367	28.0
Write-in		49	0.1
Total votes		40,623	100.0
General election
Democratic	Davina Duerr (incumbent)	55,168	69.2
Republican	Mark Davies	24,467	30.7
Write-in		106	0.1
Total votes		79,741	100.0

=== Position 2 ===
==== Candidates ====
- Shelley Kloba (Democratic), incumbent state representative

==== Results ====
Washington's 1st State House District Position 2, 2024
Primary election
Party	Candidate	Votes	%
Democratic	Shelley Kloba (incumbent)	30,529	96.0
Write-in		1,279	4.0
Total votes		31,808	100.0
General election
Democratic	Shelley Kloba (incumbent)	59,587	96.2
Write-in		2,388	3.9
Total votes		61,975	100.0

== District 2 ==
=== Position 1 ===
==== Candidates ====
- Andrew Barkis (Republican), incumbent state representative

==== Results ====
Washington's 2nd State House District Position 1, 2024
Primary election
Party	Candidate	Votes	%
Republican	Andrew Barkis (incumbent)	27,162	93.2
Write-in		1,990	6.8
Total votes		29,152	100.0
General election
Republican	Andrew Barkis (incumbent)	59,179	95.2
Write-in		2,958	4.8
Total votes		62,137	100.0

=== Position 2 ===
The incumbent is Republican J. T. Wilcox, who retired.

==== Candidates ====
- Matt Marshall (Republican), Eatonville School Board member and Three Percenter militia member
- John Snaza (Republican), former sheriff of Thurston County

===== Eliminated in primary =====
- Yanah G. Cook (Democratic), local business owner
- Michael Holloman (Democratic), supportive-living provider director

==== Endorsements ====
John Snaza (R)

State legislators

- J. T. Wilcox, incumbent state representative

Newspapers

- The News Tribune

==== Results ====
Washington's 2nd State House District Position 2, 2024
Primary election
Party	Candidate	Votes	%
Republican	Matt Marshall	12,624	34.0
Republican	John Snaza	11,057	29.8
Democratic	Yanah G. Cook	8,795	23.7
Democratic	Michael Holloman	4,574	12.3
Write-in		43	0.1
Total votes		37,093	100.0
General election
Republican	Matt Marshall	37,267	55.4
Republican	John Snaza	27,928	41.5
Write-in		2,079	3.1
Total votes		67,274	100.0

== District 3 ==
=== Position 1 ===
The incumbent is Democrat Marcus Riccelli, who retired to run for state senator following the retirement of Andy Billig.

==== Candidates ====
- Tony Kiepe (Republican), insurance professional
- Natasha Hill (Democratic), attorney and runner-up for U.S. representative in 2022

===== Eliminated in primary =====
- Ben Stuckart (Democratic), former president of Spokane City Council and runner-up for mayor of Spokane in 2019

==== Results ====
Washington's 3rd State House District Position 1, 2024
Primary election
Party	Candidate	Votes	%
Republican	Tony Kiepe	13,785	35.5
Democratic	Natasha Hill	12,634	32.5
Democratic	Ben Stuckart	12,364	31.8
Write-in		92	0.2
Total votes		38,875	100.0
General election
Democratic	Natasha Hill	43,735	58.6
Republican	Tony Kiepe	30,658	41.1
Write-in		190	0.2
Total votes		74,583	100.0

=== Position 2 ===
==== Candidates ====
- Timm Ormsby (Democratic), incumbent state representative

==== Results ====
Washington's 3rd State House District Position 2, 2024
Primary election
Party	Candidate	Votes	%
Democratic	Timm Ormsby (incumbent)	27,575	93.1
Write-in		2,046	6.9
Total votes		29,621	100.0
General election
Democratic	Timm Ormsby (incumbent)	53,667	92.8
Write-in		4,190	7.2
Total votes		57,857	100.0

== District 4 ==
=== Position 1 ===
==== Candidates ====
- Kristopher Pockell (Independent), software engineer
- Suzanne Schmidt (Republican), incumbent state representative

===== Eliminated in primary =====
- Kitten Wildes Beeler (Green), rage room owner

==== Results ====
Washington's 4th State House District Position 1, 2024
Primary election
Party	Candidate	Votes	%
Republican	Suzanne Schmidt (incumbent)	26,989	68.3
No party preference	Kristopher Pockell	8,486	21.5
Green	Kitten Wildes Beeler	3,634	9.2
Write-in		425	1.1
Total votes		39,534	100.0
General election
Republican	Suzanne Schmidt (incumbent)	54,792	68.4
No party preference	Kristopher Pockell	24,817	31.0
Write-in		545	0.7
Total votes		80,154	100.0

=== Position 2 ===
The incumbent is Republican Leonard Christian, who retired to run for state senator following the retirement of Mike Padden.

==== Candidates ====
- Rob Chase (Republican), former state representative and former treasurer of Spokane County
- Ted Cummings (Democratic), union advocate

===== Eliminated in primary =====
- Stephen T. Major (Republican), former mortgage broker
- Brandi Peetz (Republican), Spokane Valley city councilor
- Michael A. Schmidt (Republican), cattle rancher
- Ed "Woody" Wood (Democratic), former chair of the Spokane County Democrats

==== Results ====
Washington's 4th State House District Position 2, 2024
Primary election
Party	Candidate	Votes	%
Republican	Rob Chase	10,025	24.4
Democratic	Ted Cummings	9,886	24.0
Republican	Brandi Peetz	9,408	22.9
Republican	Michael A. Schmidt	6,715	16.3
Democratic	Ed "Woody" Wood	3,466	8.4
Republican	Stephen T. Major	1,592	3.9
Write-in		47	0.1
Total votes		41,139	100.0
General election
Republican	Rob Chase	52,902	63.5
Democratic	Ted Cummings	30,208	36.3
Write-in		148	0.2
Total votes		83,258	100.0

== District 5 ==
=== Position 1 ===
The incumbent is Democrat Bill Ramos, who retired to run for state senator following the retirement of Mark Mullet.

==== Candidates ====
- Mark Hargrove (Republican), retired Boeing instructor pilot
- Victoria Hunt (Democratic), Issaquah city councilor

===== Eliminated in primary =====
- Kristiana de Leon (Democratic), Black Diamond city councilor
- Landon Halverson (Republican), member of the Issaquah Economic Vitality Commission
- Jason Ritchie (Democratic), small business owner

==== Results ====
Washington's 5th State House District Position 1, 2024
Primary election
Party	Candidate	Votes	%
Democratic	Victoria Hunt	15,646	35.1
Republican	Mark Hargrove	12,270	27.5
Republican	Landon Halverson	7,701	17.3
Democratic	Kristiana de Leon	4,558	10.2
Democratic	Jason Ritchie	4,404	9.9
Write-in		22	0.1
Total votes		44,601	100.0
General election
Democratic	Victoria Hunt	45,999	54.05
Republican	Mark Hargrove	39,039	45.9
Write-in		64	0.1
Total votes		85,102	100.0

=== Position 2 ===
==== Candidates ====
- Lisa Callan (Democratic), incumbent state representative
- Patrick Peacock (Republican)

==== Results ====
Washington's 5th State House District Position 2, 2024
Primary election
Party	Candidate	Votes	%
Democratic	Lisa Callan (incumbent)	25,683	57.3
Republican	Patrick Peacock	19,105	42.6
Write-in		33	0.1
Total votes		44,821	100.0
General election
Democratic	Lisa Callan (incumbent)	47,392	55.8
Republican	Patrick Peacock	37,474	44.1
Write-in		70	0.1
Total votes		84,936	100.0

== District 6 ==
=== Position 1 ===
==== Candidates ====
- Steven McCray II (Democratic)
- Mike Volz (Republican), incumbent state representative

==== Results ====
Washington's 6th State House District Position 1, 2024
Primary election
Party	Candidate	Votes	%
Republican	Mike Volz (incumbent)	23,731	61.9
Democratic	Steven McCray II	14,495	37.8
Write-in		119	0.3
Total votes		38,345	100.0
General election
Republican	Mike Volz (incumbent)	47,492	62.3
Democratic	Steven McCray II	28,657	37.6
Write-in		130	0.2
Total votes		76,279	100.0

=== Position 2 ===
==== Candidates ====
- Jenny Graham (Republican), incumbent state representative
- Michaela Kelso (Democratic), Army veteran

==== Results ====
Washington's 6th State House District Position 2, 2024
Primary election
Party	Candidate	Votes	%
Republican	Jenny Graham (incumbent)	23,109	60.4
Democratic	Michaela Kelso	15,062	39.3
Write-in		115	0.3
Total votes		38,286	100.0
General election
Republican	Jenny Graham (incumbent)	45,958	60.3
Democratic	Michaela Kelso	30,093	39.5
Write-in		132	0.2
Total votes		76,183	100.0

== District 7 ==
=== Position 1 ===
The incumbent is Republican Jacquelin Maycumber, who retired to run for U.S. Representative following the retirement of Cathy McMorris Rodgers.

==== Candidates ====
- Andrew Engell (Republican), volunteer firefighter
- Soo Ing-Moody (Republican), former mayor of Twisp

===== Eliminated in primary =====
- Teagan Levine (Republican), Tonasket city councilor and chair of Okanogan County Republicans

==== Endorsements ====
Andrew Engell (R)

Federal officials

- Cathy McMorris Rodgers, U.S. Representative from Washington's 5th congressional district

==== Results ====
Washington's 7th State House District Position 1, 2024
Primary election
Party	Candidate	Votes	%
Republican	Andrew Engell	19,870	47.9
Republican	Soo Ing-Moody	10,485	25.3
Republican	Teagan Levine	10,278	24.8
Write-in		848	2.0
Total votes		41,481	100.0
General election
Republican	Andrew Engell	48,785	63.4
Republican	Soo Ing-Moody	27,496	35.7
Write-in		715	0.9
Total votes		76,996	100.0

=== Position 2 ===
The incumbent is Republican Joel Kretz, who retired.

==== Candidates ====
- Hunter Abell (Republican), president of the Washington State Bar Association and Ferry County District Court judge
- Paul "Rocky" Dean (Democratic), Springdale town councilor

===== Eliminated in primary =====
- Pat Bell (Republican), former congressional assistant to U.S. representative Cathy McMorris Rodgers
- Ronald L. McCoy (Republican), Chewelah city councilor and former mayor of Chewelah

==== Results ====
Washington's 7th State House District Position 2, 2024
Primary election
Party	Candidate	Votes	%
Republican	Hunter Abell	15,749	34.8
Democratic	Paul "Rocky" Dean	12,777	27.1
Republican	Pat Bell	10,967	24.2
Republican	Ronald L. McCoy	6,179	13.7
Write-in		95	0.2
Total votes		45,267	100.0
General election
Republican	Hunter Abell	58,071	70.7
Democratic	Paul "Rocky" Dean	23,929	29.1
Write-in		119	0.1
Total votes		82,119	100.0

== District 8 ==
=== Position 1 ===
==== Candidates ====
- Stephanie Barnard (Republican), incumbent state representative

==== Results ====
Washington's 8th State House District Position 1, 2024
Primary election
Party	Candidate	Votes	%
Republican	Stephanie Barnard (incumbent)	28,157	96.3
Write-in		1,081	3.7
Total votes		29,238	100.0
General election
Republican	Stephanie Barnard (incumbent)	58,288	97.5
Write-in		1,519	2.5
Total votes		59,807	100.0

=== Position 2 ===
==== Candidates ====
- John Christenson (Democratic)
- April Connors (Republican), incumbent state representative

==== Results ====
Washington's 8th State House District Position 2, 2024
Primary election
Party	Candidate	Votes	%
Republican	April Connors (incumbent)	26,441	71.9
Democratic	John Christenson	10,278	27.9
Write-in		73	0.2
Total votes		36,792	100.0
General election
Republican	April Connors (incumbent)	51,164	70.4
Democratic	John Christenson	21,360	29.4
Write-in		114	0.2
Total votes		{{{votes}}}	100.0

== District 9 ==
=== Position 1 ===
==== Candidates ====
- Mary Dye (Republican), incumbent state representative
- Patrick Miller (Democratic)

==== Results ====
Washington's 9th State House District Position 1, 2024
Primary election
Party	Candidate	Votes	%
Republican	Mary Dye (incumbent)	26,988	66.3
Democratic	Patrick Miller	13,537	33.3
Write-in		157	0.4
Total votes		40,682	100.0
General election
Republican	Mary Dye (incumbent)	50,468	64.9
Democratic	Patrick Miller	27,092	34.8
Write-in		225	0.3
Total votes		77,785	100.0

=== Position 2 ===
==== Candidates ====
- Pam Kohlmeier (Democratic), physician and attorney
- Joe Schmick (Republican), incumbent state representative

===== Eliminated in primary =====
- Arianna Arends (Democratic)

==== Endorsements ====
Pam Kohlmeier (D)

Political parties

- Spokane County Democratic Party

==== Results ====
Washington's 9th State House District Position 2, 2024
Primary election
Party	Candidate	Votes	%
Republican	Joe Schmick (incumbent)	26,958	65.8
Democratic	Pam Kohlmeier	11,582	28.3
Democratic	Arianna Arends	2,348	5.7
Write-in		95	0.2
Total votes		40,983	100.0
General election
Republican	Joe Schmick (incumbent)	50,211	63.9
Democratic	Pam Kohlmeier	28,236	35.9
Write-in		109	0.1
Total votes		78,556	100.0

== District 10 ==
=== Position 1 ===
==== Candidates ====
- Carrie R. Kennedy (Republican), Navy veteran and candidate for U.S. representative in 2022 and 2020
- Clyde Shavers (Democratic), incumbent state representative

===== Eliminated in primary =====
- Yvonne Gallardo-Van Ornam (Republican), Arlington city councilor

==== Endorsements ====
Yvonne Gallardo-Van Ornam (R)

Newspapers

- The Everett Herald

==== Results ====
Washington's 10th State House District Position 1, 2024
Primary election
Party	Candidate	Votes	%
Democratic	Clyde Shavers (incumbent)	26,484	52.32
Republican	Carrie R. Kennedy	13,374	26.4
Republican	Yvonne Gallardo-Van Ornam	10,700	21.1
Write-in		58	0.1
Total votes		50,616	100.0
General election
Democratic	Clyde Shavers (incumbent)	47,473	53.2
Republican	Carrie R. Kennedy	41,578	46.6
Write-in		172	0.2
Total votes		89,223	100.0

=== Position 2 ===
==== Candidates ====
- Dave Paul (Democratic), incumbent state representative
- Gary Wray (Republican)

==== Results ====
Washington's 10th State House District Position 2, 2024
Primary election
Party	Candidate	Votes	%
Democratic	Dave Paul (incumbent)	28,186	55.5
Republican	Gary Wray	22,542	44.4
Write-in		53	0.1
Total votes		50,781	100.0
General election
Democratic	Dave Paul (incumbent)	47,826	53.7
Republican	Gary Wray	41,137	46.2
Write-in		118	0.1
Total votes		89,081	100.0

== District 11 ==
=== Position 1 ===
==== Candidates ====
- David Hackney (Democratic), incumbent state representative

==== Results ====
Washington's 11th State House District Position 1, 2024
Primary election
Party	Candidate	Votes	%
Democratic	David Hackney (incumbent)	20,702	95.3
Write-in		1,019	4.7
Total votes		21,721	100.0
General election
Democratic	David Hackney (incumbent)	46,438	95.9
Write-in		1,978	4.1
Total votes		48,416	100.0

=== Position 2 ===
==== Candidates ====
- Steve Bergquist (Democratic), incumbent state representative
- Justin Greywolf (Libertarian)

==== Results ====
Washington's 11th State House District Position 2, 2024
Primary election
Party	Candidate	Votes	%
Democratic	Steve Bergquist (incumbent)	20,342	80.3
Libertarian	Justin Greywolf	4,607	18.2
Write-in		372	1.5
Total votes		25,321	100.0
General election
Democratic	Steve Bergquist (incumbent)	43,389	76.9
Libertarian	Justin Greywolf	12,508	22.2
Write-in		541	1.0
Total votes		56,438	100.0

== District 12 ==
=== Position 1 ===
The incumbent is Republican Keith Goehner, who retired to run for state senator following the retirement of Brad Hawkins.

==== Candidates ====
- Brian Burnett (Republican), former Chelan County sheriff
- Heather Koellen (Democratic), North Bend councilor

===== Eliminated in primary =====
- Jennifer Bumpus (Republican), Monroe School District board director

==== Results ====
Washington's 12th State House District Position 1, 2024
Primary election
Party	Candidate	Votes	%
Democratic	Heather Koellen	19,302	44.6
Republican	Brian Burnett	17,997	41.6
Republican	Jennifer Bumpus	5,920	13.7
Write-in		34	0.1
Total votes		43,253	100.0
General election
Republican	Brian Burnett	44,318	53.3
Democratic	Heather Koellen	38,800	46.6
Write-in		92	0.1
Total votes		83,210	100.0

=== Position 2 ===
==== Candidates ====
- Daniel Scott (Republican), engineer
- Mike Steele (Republican), incumbent state representative

==== Results ====
Washington's 12th State House District Position 2, 2024
Primary election
Party	Candidate	Votes	%
Republican	Mike Steele (incumbent)	25,482	71.9
Republican	Daniel Scott	8,340	23.5
Write-in		1,602	4.5
Total votes		35,424	100.0
General election
Republican	Mike Steele (incumbent)	44,400	61.7
Republican	Daniel Scott	25,741	35.8
Write-in		1,771	2.5
Total votes		71,912	100.0

== District 13 ==
=== Position 1 ===
==== Candidates ====
- Tom Dent (Republican), incumbent state representative

==== Results ====
Washington's 13th State House District Position 1, 2024
Primary election
Party	Candidate	Votes	%
Republican	Tom Dent (incumbent)	23,543	96.6
Write-in		826	3.4
Total votes		24,369	100.0
General election
Republican	Tom Dent (incumbent)	51,493	97.3
Write-in		1,406	2.7
Total votes		52,899	100.0

=== Position 2 ===
==== Candidates ====
- Alex Ybarra (Republican), incumbent state representative

==== Results ====
Washington's 13th State House District Position 2, 2024
Primary election
Party	Candidate	Votes	%
Republican	Alex Ybarra (incumbent)	23,404	97.0
Write-in		728	3.0
Total votes		24,132	100.0
General election
Republican	Alex Ybarra (incumbent)	51,012	97.7
Write-in		1,210	2.3
Total votes		52,222	100.0

== District 14 ==
=== Position 1 ===
The incumbent is Republican Chris Corry, who was redistricted to and running in the 15th district.

==== Candidates ====
- Chelsea Dimas (Democratic), Washington State Human Rights commissioner
- Gloria Mendoza (Republican), mayor of Grandview and former Grandview city councilor

===== Eliminated in primary =====
- Andy Kallinen (Republican), park ranger

==== Endorsements ====
Chelsea Dimas (D)

Unions

- American Federation of Teachers
- LGBTQ+ Victory Fund
- United Farm Workers
Gloria Mendoza (R)

Political parties

- Yakima County Republican Party

==== Results ====
Washington's 14th State House District Position 1, 2024
Primary election
Party	Candidate	Votes	%
Democratic	Chelsea Dimas	5,241	36.9
Republican	Gloria Mendoza	4,627	32.6
Republican	Andy Kallinen	4,288	30.2
Write-in		32	0.23
Total votes		14,188	100.0
General election
Republican	Gloria Mendoza	18,263	53.9
Democratic	Chelsea Dimas	15,418	45.5
Write-in		189	0.6
Total votes		33,870	100.0

=== Position 2 ===
The incumbent is Republican Gina Mosbrucker, who retired.

==== Candidates ====
- Ana Ruiz Kennedy (Democratic), business liaison
- Deb Manjarrez (Republican), farmer and public accountant

===== Eliminated in primary =====
- Eddie Perez (Independent), small business owner

==== Endorsements ====
Ana Ruiz Kennedy (D)

Unions

- International Brotherhood of Teamsters Local 839
- United Farm Workers
- Washington State Labor Council
Deb Manjarrez (R)

Political parties

- Yakima County Republican Party

==== Results ====
Washington's 14th State House District Position 2, 2024
Primary election
Party	Candidate	Votes	%
Republican	Deb Manjarrez	7,681	54.2
Democratic	Ana Ruiz Kennedy	5,588	39.4
No party preference	Eddie Perez	870	6.1
Write-in		28	0.2
Total votes		14,167	100.0
General election
Republican	Deb Manjarrez	17,188	50.7
Democratic	Ana Ruiz Kennedy		49.0
Write-in		113	0.3
Total votes		33,921	100.0

== District 15 ==
=== Position 1 ===
The incumbent is Republican Bruce Chandler, who retired.

==== Candidates ====
- Chris Corry (Republican), state representative (redistricted from the 14th district)
- Chase Foster (Independent)

==== Results ====
Washington's 15th State House District Position 1, 2024
Primary election
Party	Candidate	Votes	%
Republican	Chris Corry (incumbent)	25,616	75.6
No party preference	Chase Foster	7,901	23.3
Write-in		382	1.1
Total votes		33,899	100.0
General election
Republican	Chris Corry (incumbent)	46,438	70.7
No party preference	Chase Foster	18,736	28.5
Write-in		553	0.8
Total votes		65,727	100.0

=== Position 2 ===
The incumbent is Republican Bryan Sandlin, who retired.

==== Candidates ====
- Rich Bright (Republican)
- Jeremie Dufault (Republican), former state representative

==== Results ====
Washington's 15th State House District Position 2, 2024
Primary election
Party	Candidate	Votes	%
Republican	Jeremie Dufault (incumbent)	24,133	74.5
Republican	Rich Bright	7,277	22.5
Write-in		988	3.0
Total votes		32,270	100.0
General election
Republican	Jeremie Dufault (incumbent)	44,514	70.7
Republican	Rich Bright	17,035	27.1
Write-in		1,391	2.2
Total votes		62,940	100.0

== District 16 ==
=== Position 1 ===
==== Candidates ====
- Linda Gunshefski (Democratic), eye physician and surgeon
- Mark Klicker (Republican), incumbent state representative

==== Results ====
Washington's 16th State House District Position 1, 2024
Primary election
Party	Candidate	Votes	%
Republican	Mark Klicker (incumbent)	23,303	64.8
Democratic	Linda Gunshefski	12,660	35.2
Write-in		22	0.1
Total votes		35,985	100.0
General election
Republican	Mark Klicker (incumbent)	45,890	64.5
Democratic	Linda Gunshefski	25,232	35.5
Write-in		35	0.1
Total votes		71,157	100.0

=== Position 2 ===
==== Candidates ====
- Skyler Rude (Republican), incumbent state representative
- Craig R. Woodward (Democratic), retired union electrician

==== Results ====
Washington's 16th State House District Position 2, 2024
Primary election
Party	Candidate	Votes	%
Republican	Skyler Rude (incumbent)	23,927	66.7
Democratic	Craig R. Woodard	11,895	33.2
Write-in		40	0.1
Total votes		35,862	100.0
General election
Republican	Skyler Rude (incumbent)	46,596	65.8
Democratic	Craig R. Woodard	24,145	34.1
Write-in		40	0.1
Total votes		70,781	100.0

== District 17 ==
=== Position 1 ===
==== Candidates ====
- Kevin Waters (Republican), incumbent state representative

==== Results ====
Washington's 17th State House District Position 1, 2024
Primary election
Party	Candidate	Votes	%
Republican	Kevin Waters (incumbent)	27,933	92.1
Write-in		2,414	8.0
Total votes		30,347	100.0
General election
Republican	Kevin Waters (incumbent)	55,952	93.26
Write-in		4,045	6.74
Total votes		59,997	100.0

=== Position 2 ===
The incumbent is Republican Paul Harris, who retired to run for state senator following the retirement of Lynda Wilson.

==== Candidates ====
- Terri Niles (Democratic), intensive care unit nurse
- David Stuebe (Republican), mayor of Washougal and former Washougal city councilor

===== Eliminated in primary =====
- Hannah Joy (Republican), conservative activist

==== Results ====
Washington's 17th State House District Position 2, 2024
Primary election
Party	Candidate	Votes	%
Democratic	Terri Niles	21,551	47.7
Republican	David Stuebe	12,412	27.5
Republican	Hannah Joy	11,129	24.7
Write-in		51	0.1
Total votes		44,811	100.0
General election
Republican	David Stuebe	43,022	50.4
Democratic	Terri Niles	42,195	49.4
Write-in		148	0.2
Total votes		85,365	100.0

== District 18 ==
=== Position 1 ===
==== Candidates ====
- Deken Letinich (Democratic), union construction laborer
- Stephanie McClintock (Republican), incumbent state representative

==== Endorsements ====
Deken Letinich (D)

State executive officials

- Steve Hobbs, Washington Secretary of State

==== Results ====
Washington's 18th State House District Position 1, 2024
Primary election
Party	Candidate	Votes	%
Republican	Stephanie McClintock (incumbent)	23,739	55.3
Democratic	Deken Letinich	19,138	44.6
Write-in		50	0.1
Total votes		42,927	100.0
General election
Republican	Stephanie McClintock (incumbent)	46,622	55.7
Democratic	Deken Letinich	37,053	44.2
Write-in		100	0.1
Total votes		83,775	100.0

=== Position 2 ===
The incumbent is Republican Greg Cheney, who retired to run for state senator following the retirement of Ann Rivers.

==== Candidates ====
- John Ley (Republican), former reporter
- John Zingale (Democratic), public school teacher

===== Eliminated in primary =====
- Philip L. Johnson (Republican), former Battle Ground mayor and former Battle Ground city councilor

==== Results ====
Washington's 18th State House District Position 2, 2024
Primary election
Party	Candidate	Votes	%
Democratic	John Zingale	20,641	47.8
Republican	John Ley	16,590	38.4
Republican	Philip L. Johnson	5,889	13.6
Write-in		41	0.1
Total votes		43,161	100.0
General election
Republican	John Ley	42,603	50.9
Democratic	John Zingale	40,995	49.0
Write-in		150	0.2
Total votes		83,748	100.0

== District 19 ==
=== Position 1 ===
==== Candidates ====
- Mike Coverdale (Democratic), candidate for U.S. representative in 2016
- Jim Walsh (Republican), incumbent state representative

==== Results ====
Washington's 19th State House District Position 1, 2024
Primary election
Party	Candidate	Votes	%
Republican	Jim Walsh (incumbent)	25,771	59.6
Democratic	Mike Coverdale	17,450	40.3
Write-in		54	0.1
Total votes		43,275	100.0
General election
Republican	Jim Walsh (incumbent)	48,544	60.1
Democratic	Mike Coverdale	32,094	39.8
Write-in		76	0.1
Total votes		80,714	100.0

=== Position 2 ===
==== Candidates ====
- Terry Carlson (Democratic)
- Joel McEntire (Republican), incumbent state representative

===== Eliminated in primary =====
- Justin Franks (Libertarian)

==== Results ====
Washington's 19th State House District Position 2, 2024
Primary election
Party	Candidate	Votes	%
Republican	Joel McEntire (incumbent)	25,007	58.4
Democratic	Terry Carlson	16,330	38.1
Libertarian	Justin Franks	1,469	3.4
Write-in		52	0.1
Total votes		42,858	100.0
General election
Republican	Joel McEntire (incumbent)	49,665	62.2
Democratic	Terry Carlson	30,141	37.7
Write-in		77	0.1
Total votes		79,883	100.0

== District 20 ==
=== Position 1 ===
==== Candidates ====
- Peter Abbarno (Republican), incumbent state representative
- Melvin Kaleolani Apana (Culture Republican (Note: Not an actual political party. In Washington, independent candidates are allowed to choose a ballot label.))

==== Results ====
Washington's 20th State House District Position 1, 2024
Primary election
Party	Candidate	Votes	%
Republican	Peter Abbarno (incumbent)	35,209	89.3
Culture Republican	Melvin Kaleolani Apana	2,768	7.0
Write-in		1,440	3.7
Total votes		39,417	100.0
General election
Republican	Peter Abbarno (incumbent)	67,633	87.0
Culture Republican	Melvin Kaleolani Apana	8,295	10.7
Write-in		1,799	2.3
Total votes		77,727	100.0

=== Position 2 ===
==== Candidates ====
- Ed Orcutt, incumbent state representative

==== Results ====
Washington's 20th State House District Position 2, 2024
Primary election
Party	Candidate	Votes	%
Republican	Ed Orcutt (incumbent)	34,094	95.2
Write-in		1,739	4.9
Total votes		35,833	100.0
General election
Republican	Ed Orcutt (incumbent)	66,170	96.7
Write-in		2,293	3.4
Total votes		68,463	100.0

== District 21 ==
=== Position 1 ===
==== Candidates ====
- Riaz Khan (Republican), former vice chair of 21st Legislative District Democrats and former Mukilteo city councilor
- Strom Peterson (Democratic), incumbent state representative

===== Eliminated in primary =====
- Jason Moon (Democratic), Mukilteo city councilor

==== Endorsements ====
Jason Moon (D)

Local officials

- Joe Marine, mayor of Mukilteo
Strom Peterson (D)

Federal officials

- Maria Cantwell, U.S. Senator from Washington
- Patty Murray, U.S. Senator from Washington

==== Results ====
Washington's 21st State House District Position 1, 2024
Primary election
Party	Candidate	Votes	%
Democratic	Strom Peterson (incumbent)	17,893	50.5
Republican	Riaz Khan	9,715	27.4
Democratic	Jason Moon	7,746	21.9
Write-in		76	0.2
Total votes		35,430	100.0
General election
Democratic	Strom Peterson (incumbent)	46,705	66.7
Republican	Riaz Khan	23,156	33.1
Write-in		169	0.2
Total votes		70,030	100.0

=== Position 2 ===
==== Candidates ====
- Kristina Mitchell (Conservative), former public school teacher
- Lillian Ortiz-Self (Democratic), incumbent state representative

===== Eliminated in primary =====
- Bruce Guthrie (Libertarian), substitute teacher

==== Results ====
Washington's 21st State House District Position 2, 2024
Primary election
Party	Candidate	Votes	%
Democratic	Lillian Ortiz-Self (incumbent)	23,435	67.2
Conservative	Kristina Mitchell	7,806	22.4
Libertarian	Bruce Guthrie	3,555	10.2
Write-in		86	0.3
Total votes		34,882	100.0
General election
Democratic	Lillian Ortiz-Self (incumbent)	46,422	67.1
Conservative	Kristina Mitchell	22,579	32.7
Write-in		156	0.2
Total votes		69,157	100.0

== District 22 ==
=== Position 1 ===
==== Candidates ====
- Beth Doglio (Democratic), incumbent state representative
- Steve Owens (Independent)

==== Results ====
Washington's 22nd State House District Position 1, 2024
Primary election
Party	Candidate	Votes	%
Democratic	Beth Doglio (incumbent)	33,259	74.8
No party preference	Steve Owens	10,711	24.1
Write-in		483	1.1
Total votes		44,453	100.0
General election
Democratic	Beth Doglio (incumbent)	56,646	69.6
No party preference	Steve Owens	24,229	29.8
Write-in		510	0.6
Total votes		81,385	100.0

=== Position 2 ===
The incumbent is Democrat Jessica Bateman, who retired to run for state senator following the retirement of Sam Hunt.

==== Candidates ====
- Lisa Parshley (Democratic), Olympia city councilor
- Syd Locke (Democratic), senior legislative assistant

==== Endorsements ====
Lisa Parshley (D)

State legislators

- Jessica Bateman, incumbent state representative

Local officials

- Dontae Payne, mayor of Olympia
- Cheryl Selby, former mayor of Olympia

==== Results ====
Washington's 22nd State House District Position 2, 2024
Primary election
Party	Candidate	Votes	%
Democratic	Lisa Parshley	25,943	63.1
Democratic	Syd Locke	13,801	33.5
Write-in		1,403	3.4
Total votes		41,147	100.0
General election
Democratic	Lisa Parshley	46,932	62.4
Democratic	Syd Locke	26,183	34.8
Write-in		2,090	2.8
Total votes		75,205	100.0

== District 23 ==
=== Position 1 ===
==== Candidates ====
- Kurt Robertson (Republican), businessman
- Tarra Simmons (Democratic), incumbent state representative

===== Eliminated in primary =====
- Tiffany Attrill (Independent), social worker

==== Results ====
Washington's 23rd State House District Position 1, 2024
Primary election
Party	Candidate	Votes	%
Democratic	Tarra Simmons (incumbent)	29,433	60.7
Republican	Kurt Robertson	14,973	30.9
Independent	Tiffany Attrill	4,046	8.3
Write-in		55	0.1
Total votes		48,507	100.0
General election
Democratic	Tarra Simmons (incumbent)	53,928	62.9
Republican	Kurt Robertson	31,609	37.1
Write-in			
Total votes			100.0

=== Position 2 ===
==== Candidates ====
- Jamie Miles (Republican)
- Greg Nance (Democratic), incumbent state representative

===== Eliminated in primary =====
- Brynn Felix (Democratic), general counsel to Peninsula Community Health Services
- John Gibbons (Democratic)

==== Results ====
Washington's 23rd State House District Position 2, 2024
Primary election
Party	Candidate	Votes	%
Democratic	Greg Nance (incumbent)	22,250	45.9
Republican	Jamie Miles	14,370	29.7
Democratic	Brynn Felix	9,309	19.2
Democratic	John Gibbons	2,487	5.1
Write-in		56	0.1
Total votes		48,472	100.0
General election
Democratic	Greg Nance (incumbent)	56,894	65.8
Republican	Jamie Miles	29,439	34.1
Write-in		116	0.1
Total votes		86,449	100.0

== District 24 ==
=== Position 1 ===
The incumbent is Democrat Mike Chapman, who retired to run for state senator following the retirement of Kevin Van De Wege.

==== Candidates ====
- Adam Bernbaum (Democratic), former administrative assistant to State Senator Kevin Van De Wege.
- Matt Roberson (Republican), deputy prosecuting attorney for Clallam County

===== Eliminated in primary =====
- Eric Pickens (Democratic), school teacher
- JR Streifel (Republican), former firefighter
- Nate Tyler (Democratic), Makah Tribal Council Member and former police officer

==== Endorsements ====
Adam Bernbaum (D)

State legislators

- Mike Chapman, incumbent state representative (co-endorsement with Pickens and Tyler)
- Kevin Van De Wege, state senator
Eric Pickens (D)

State legislators

- Mike Chapman, incumbent state representative (co-endorsement with Bernbaum and Tyler)

Individuals

- Larry Delaney, president of the Washington Education Association
Nate Tyler (D)

State legislators

- Mike Chapman, incumbent state representative (co-endorsement with Bernbaum and Pickens)

==== Results ====
Washington's 24th State House District Position 1, 2024
Primary election
Party	Candidate	Votes	%
Democratic	Adam Bernbaum	15,743	27.6
Republican	Matt Roberson	15,182	26.7
Democratic	Eric Pickens	10,051	17.7
Democratic	Nate Tyler	8,052	14.1
Republican	JR Streifel	7,896	13.9
Write-in		35	0.1
Total votes		56,959	100.0
General election
Democratic	Adam Bernbaum	52,001	54.9
Republican	Matt Roberson	42,555	44.9
Write-in		132	0.1
Total votes		94,694	100.0

=== Position 2 ===
==== Candidates ====
- Terry Roberts (Republican), social services worker
- Steve Tharinger (Democratic), incumbent state representative

===== Eliminated in primary =====
- Hickory Grant (Republican), Forks city councilor

==== Results ====
Washington's 24th State House District Position 2, 2024
Primary election
Party	Candidate	Votes	%
Democratic	Steve Tharinger (incumbent)	34,178	59.4
Republican	Terry Roberts	14,835	25.8
Republican	Hickory Grant	8,506	14.8
Write-in		48	0.1
Total votes		57,567	100.0
General election
Democratic	Steve Tharinger (incumbent)	52,481	55.3
Republican	Terry Roberts	42,265	44.6
Write-in		108	0.1
Total votes		94,854	100.0

== District 25 ==
=== Position 1 ===
The incumbent is Republican Kelly Chambers, who retired to run for Pierce County Executive.

==== Candidates ====
- Michael Keaton (Republican)
- Cameron Severns (Democratic)

==== Results ====
Washington's 25th State House District Position 1, 2024
Primary election
Party	Candidate	Votes	%
Republican	Michael Keaton	19,302	55.9
Democratic	Cameron Severns	15,201	44.0
Write-in		33	0.1
Total votes		34,536	100.0
General election
Republican	Michael Keaton	40,458	55.9
Democratic	Cameron Severns	31,833	44.0
Write-in		41	0.1
Total votes		72,332	100.0

=== Position 2 ===
==== Candidates ====
- Cyndy Jacobsen (Republican), incumbent state representative
- Shellie Willis (Democratic)

==== Results ====
Washington's 25th State House District Position 2, 2024
Primary election
Party	Candidate	Votes	%
Republican	Cyndy Jacobsen (incumbent)	19,658	57.0
Democratic	Shellie Willis	14,800	42.9
Write-in		38	0.1
Total votes		34,496	100.0
General election
Republican	Cyndy Jacobsen (incumbent)	40,199	55.7
Democratic	Shellie Willis	31,888	44.2
Write-in		51	0.1
Total votes		72,138	100.0

== District 26 ==
=== Position 1 ===
The incumbent is Republican Spencer Hutchins, who retired.

==== Candidates ====
- Adison Richards (Democratic), lawyer
- Jesse Young (Republican), former state representative

===== Eliminated in primary =====
- Jim Henderson (Republican), business owner

==== Endorsements ====
Jim Henderson (R)

State legislators

- Spencer Hutchins, incumbent state representative
- Michelle Caldier, state representative
Adison Richards (D)

Federal officials

- Derek Kilmer, U.S. Representative for Washington's 6th congressional district

State executive officials

- Hilary Franz, Public Lands Commissioner of Washington

State legislators

- Emily Randall, state senator

Local officials

- Robyn Denson, Pierce County councilwoman
Jesse Young (R)

Political parties

- 26th Legislative Republican Party
- Kitsap County Republican Party
- Pierce County Republican Party

==== Results ====
Washington's 26th State House District Position 1, 2024
Primary election
Party	Candidate	Votes	%
Democratic	Adison Richards	25,096	49.6
Republican	Jesse Young	17,137	33.9
Republican	Jim Henderson	8,326	16.5
Write-in		41	0.1
Total votes		50,600	100.0
General election
Democratic	Adison Richards	46,833	51.8
Republican	Jesse Young	43,503	48.1
Write-in		129	0.1
Total votes		90,465	100.0

=== Position 2 ===
==== Candidates ====
- Michelle Caldier (Republican), incumbent state representative
- Tiffiny Mitchell (Democratic), former Oregon state representative

===== Eliminated in primary =====
- Rachel Harter (Republican), pharmaceutical area sales manager
- Lori McPherson (Democratic), radio host
- Josh Smith (Independent), former National Weather Service meteorologist

==== Endorsements ====
Rachel Harter (R)

Political parties

- Pierce County Republican Party
Tiffiny Mitchell (D)

Federal officials

- Derek Kilmer, U.S. Representative for Washington's 6th congressional district

Unions

- Washington State Labor Council

==== Results ====
Washington's 26th State House District Position 2, 2024
Primary election
Party	Candidate	Votes	%
Republican	Michelle Caldier (incumbent)	16,878	33.8
Democratic	Tiffiny Mitchell	14,909	29.8
Republican	Rachel Harter	9,204	18.4
Democratic	Lori McPherson	5,236	10.5
No party preference	Josh Smith	3,814	7.6
Write-in		40	0.1
Total votes		50,081	100.0
General election
Republican	Michelle Caldier (incumbent)	49,086	54.6
Democratic	Tiffiny Mitchell	40,636	45.2
Write-in		187	0.2
Total votes		89,909	100.0

== District 27 ==
=== Position 1 ===
==== Candidates ====
- Laurie Jinkins (Democratic), incumbent state representative
- Ken Paulson (Republican)

==== Results ====
Washington's 27th State House District Position 1, 2024
Primary election
Party	Candidate	Votes	%
Democratic	Laurie Jinkins (incumbent)	27,220	73.4
Republican	Ken Paulson	9,756	26.3
Write-in		102	0.3
Total votes		37,078	100.0
General election
Democratic	Laurie Jinkins (incumbent)	51,628	71.7
Republican	Ken Paulson	20,301	28.2
Write-in		122	0.2
Total votes		72,051	100.0

=== Position 2 ===
==== Candidates ====
- Jake Fey (Democratic), incumbent state representative
- Devin Rydel Kelly (Democratic), activist

==== Results ====
Washington's 27th State House District Position 1, 2024
Primary election
Party	Candidate	Votes	%
Democratic	Jake Fey (incumbent)	23,332	70.2
Democratic	Devin Rydel Kelly	8,962	27.0
Write-in		962	2.9
Total votes		33,256	100.0
General election
Democratic	Jake Fey (incumbent)	49,311	75.5
Democratic	Devin Rydel Kelly	14,825	22.7
Write-in		1,210	1.9
Total votes		65,346	100.0

== District 28 ==
=== Position 1 ===
==== Candidates ====
- Mari Leavitt (Democratic), incumbent state representative
- Gabe Sachwitz (Republican), math teacher and firefighter

==== Results ====
Washington's 28th State House District Position 1, 2024
Primary election
Party	Candidate	Votes	%
Democratic	Mari Leavitt (incumbent)	17,953	59.0
Republican	Gabe Sachwitz	12,440	40.9
Write-in		36	0.1
Total votes		30,429	100.0
General election
Democratic	Mari Leavitt (incumbent)	34,629	58.4
Republican	Gabe Sachwitz	24,549	41.4
Write-in		75	0.1
Total votes		59,253	100.0

=== Position 2 ===
==== Candidates ====
- Dan Bronoske (Democratic), incumbent state representative
- Mark Herr (Republican), business owner

==== Results ====
Washington's 28th State House District Position 2, 2024
Primary election
Party	Candidate	Votes	%
Democratic	Dan Bronoske (incumbent)	17,739	58.7
Republican	Mark Herr	12,432	41.2
Write-in		39	0.1
Total votes		30,210	100.0
General election
Democratic	Dan Bronoske (incumbent)	34,129	57.9
Republican	Mark Herr	24,772	42.0
Write-in		66	0.1
Total votes		58,967	100.0

== District 29 ==
=== Position 1 ===
==== Candidates ====
- Richard Miller (Democratic)
- Melanie Morgan (Democratic), incumbent state representative

==== Results ====
Washington's 29th State House District Position 1, 2024
Primary election
Party	Candidate	Votes	%
Democratic	Melanie Morgan (incumbent)	12,983	67.5
Democratic	Richard Miller	5,165	26.9
Write-in		1,090	5.7
Total votes		19,238	100.0
General election
Democratic	Melanie Morgan (incumbent)	31,993	68.6
Democratic	Richard Miller	13,152	28.2
Write-in		1,478	3.2
Total votes		46,623	100.0

=== Position 2 ===
==== Candidates ====
- Sharlett Mena (Democratic), incumbent state representative

==== Results ====
Washington's 29th State House District Position 2, 2024
Primary election
Party	Candidate	Votes	%
Democratic	Sharlett Mena (incumbent)	16,375	92.4
Write-in		1,345	7.6
Total votes		17,720	100.0
General election
Democratic	Sharlett Mena (incumbent)	39,333	93.8
Write-in		2,604	6.2
Total votes		41,937	100.0

== District 30 ==
=== Position 1 ===
==== Candidates ====
- Melissa Hamilton (Republican), data systems coordinator
- Jamila Taylor (Democratic), incumbent state representative

==== Results ====
Washington's 30th State House District Position 1, 2024
Primary election
Party	Candidate	Votes	%
Democratic	Jamila Taylor (incumbent)	14,834	57.1
Republican	Melissa Hamilton	11,144	42.9
Write-in		20	0.1
Total votes		25,998	100.0
General election
Democratic	Jamila Taylor (incumbent)	30,723	56.2
Republican	Melissa Hamilton	23,924	43.7
Write-in		67	0.1
Total votes		54,714	100.0

=== Position 2 ===
==== Candidates ====
- Quentin Morris (Republican)
- Kristine Reeves (Democratic), incumbent state representative

==== Results ====
Washington's 30th State House District Position 2, 2024
Primary election
Party	Candidate	Votes	%
Democratic	Kristine Reeves (incumbent)	15,358	59.2
Republican	Quentin Morris	10,567	40.7
Write-in		16	0.1
Total votes		25,941	100.0
General election
Democratic	Kristine Reeves (incumbent)	32,043	58.7
Republican	Quentin Morris	22,491	41.2
Write-in		56	0.1
Total votes		54,590	100.0

== District 31 ==
=== Position 1 ===
==== Candidates ====
- Drew Stokesbary (Republican), incumbent state representative
- Sara Sutterfield (Democratic), artist

==== Endorsements ====
Drew Stokesbary (R)

Newspapers

- The News Tribune

==== Results ====
Washington's 31st State House District Position 1, 2024
Primary election
Party	Candidate	Votes	%
Republican	Drew Stokesbary (incumbent)	24,863	63.8
Democratic	Sara Sutterfield	14,072	36.1
Write-in		46	0.1
Total votes		38,981	100.0
General election
Republican	Drew Stokesbary (incumbent)	51,651	63.6
Democratic	Sara Sutterfield	29,451	36.3
Write-in		79	0.1
Total votes		81,181	100.0

=== Position 2 ===
The incumbent is Republican Eric Robertson, who retired.

==== Candidates ====
- Brian L. Gunn (Democratic), software engineer
- Josh Penner (Republican), mayor of Orting

===== Eliminated in primary =====
- Brandon Benyon (Republican), realtor
- Bill Thomas (Democratic)

==== Endorsements ====
Joshua Penner (R)

State legislators

- Eric Robertson, incumbent state representative

Newspapers

- The News Tribune

==== Results ====
Washington's 31st State House District Position 2, 2024
Primary election
Party	Candidate	Votes	%
Republican	Josh Penner	14,825	38.5
Democratic	Brian Gunn	11,625	30.2
Republican	Brandon Benyon	9,344	24.3
Democratic	Bill Thomas	2,633	6.8
Write-in		64	0.2
Total votes		38,491	100.0
General election
Republican	Josh Penner	49,335	61.1
Democratic	Brian Gunn	31,338	38.8
Write-in		96	0.1
Total votes		80,769	100.0

== District 32 ==
=== Position 1 ===
==== Candidates ====
- Lisa Rezac (Republican)
- Cindy Ryu (Democratic), incumbent state representative

==== Results ====
Washington's 32nd State House District Position 1, 2024
Primary election
Party	Candidate	Votes	%
Democratic	Cindy Ryu (incumbent)	31,179	76.4
Republican	Lisa Rezac	9,562	23.4
Write-in		59	0.1
Total votes		40,800	100.0
General election
Democratic	Cindy Ryu (incumbent)	58,021	74.2
Republican	Lisa Rezac	20,084	25.7
Write-in		128	0.2
Total votes		78,233	100.0

=== Position 2 ===
==== Candidates ====
- Lauren Davis (Democratic), incumbent state representative
- Lori Theis (Republican), business owner

===== Eliminated in primary =====
- Dunia Wabenga (Democratic), immigrant and veteran

==== Results ====
Washington's 32nd State House District Position 2, 2024
Primary election
Party	Candidate	Votes	%
Democratic	Lauren Davis (incumbent)	28,208	70.0
Republican	Lori Theis	9,389	23.3
Democratic	Dunia Wabenga	2,690	6.7
Write-in		33	0.1
Total votes		40,320	100.0
General election
Democratic	Lauren Davis (incumbent)	58,169	74.6
Republican	Lori Theis	19,661	25.2
Write-in		110	0.1
Total votes		77,940	100.0

== District 33 ==
=== Position 1 ===
==== Candidates ====
- Tina Orwall (Democratic), incumbent state representative
- George Richter (Republican)

==== Results ====
Washington's 33rd State House District Position 1, 2024
Primary election
Party	Candidate	Votes	%
Democratic	Tina Orwall (incumbent)	19,705	70.3
Republican	George Richter	8,297	29.6
Write-in		45	0.2
Total votes		28,047	100.0
General election
Democratic	Tina Orwall (incumbent)	38,898	69.0
Republican	George Richter	17,423	30.9
Write-in		60	0.1
Total votes		56,381	100.0

=== Position 2 ===
==== Candidates ====
- Casey Esmond (Independent)
- Mia Su-Ling Gregerson (Democratic), incumbent state representative

==== Results ====
Washington's 33rd State House District Position 2, 2024
Primary election
Party	Candidate	Votes	%
Democratic	Mia Su-Ling Gregerson (incumbent)	19,534	73.2
No party preference	Casey Esmond	7,004	26.2
Write-in		166	0.6
Total votes		26,704	100.0
General election
Democratic	Mia Su-Ling Gregerson (incumbent)	38,152	70.8
No party preference	Casey Esmond	15,454	28.7
Write-in		310	0.6
Total votes		53,916	100.0

== District 34 ==
=== Position 1 ===
==== Candidates ====
- Emily Alvarado (Democratic), incumbent state representative
- Kimberly M. Cloud (Republican)

==== Results ====
Washington's 34th State House District Position 1, 2024
Primary election
Party	Candidate	Votes	%
Democratic	Emily Alvarado (incumbent)	37,901	86.5
Republican	Kimberly M. Cloud	5,848	13.3
Write-in		86	0.2
Total votes		43,835	100.0
General election
Democratic	Emily Alvarado (incumbent)	70,218	84.9
Republican	Kimberly M. Cloud	12,362	14.9
Write-in		143	0.2
Total votes		83,723	100.0

=== Position 2 ===
==== Candidates ====
- Joe Fitzgibbon (Democratic), incumbent state representative
- Jolie Lansdowne (Republican), delegate to the 2024 Republican National Convention

==== Results ====
Washington's 34th State House District Position 2, 2024
Primary election
Party	Candidate	Votes	%
Democratic	Joe Fitzgibbon (incumbent)	37,571	85.4
Republican	Jolie Lansdowne	6,398	14.5
Write-in		47	0.1
Total votes		44,016	100.0
General election
Democratic	Joe Fitzgibbon (incumbent)	69,340	83.7
Republican	Jolie Lansdowne	13,446	16.2
Write-in		96	0.1
Total votes		82,882	100.0

== District 35 ==
=== Position 1 ===
==== Candidates ====
- Dan Griffey (Republican), incumbent state representative

==== Results ====
Washington's 35th State House District Position 1, 2024
Primary election
Party	Candidate	Votes	%
Republican	Dan Griffey (incumbent)	33,821	92.6
Write-in		2,723	7.5
Total votes		36,544	100.0
General election
Republican	Dan Griffey (incumbent)	65,027	94.8
Write-in		3,604	5.2
Total votes		68,631	100.0

=== Position 2 ===
==== Candidates ====
- Travis Couture (Republican), incumbent state representative
- James DeHart (Democratic), Washington State Gambling Commission employee

===== Eliminated in primary =====
- Eric Onisko (Republican)

==== Results ====
Washington's 35th State House District Position 2, 2024
Primary election
Party	Candidate	Votes	%
Republican	Travis Couture (incumbent)	22,722	46.7
Democratic	James DeHart	20,952	43.0
Republican	Eric Onisko	4,951	10.2
Write-in		75	0.2
Total votes		48,700	100.0
General election
Republican	Travis Couture (incumbent)	51,999	58.6
Democratic	James DeHart	36,664	41.3
Write-in		97	0.1
Total votes		88,760	100.0

== District 36 ==
=== Position 1 ===
==== Candidates ====
- Julia Reed (Democratic), incumbent state representative

==== Results ====
Washington's 36th State House District Position 1, 2024
Primary election
Party	Candidate	Votes	%
Democratic	Julia Reed (incumbent)	40,426	98.4
Write-in		660	1.6
Total votes		41,086	100.0
General election
Democratic	Julia Reed (incumbent)	77,616	98.5
Write-in		1,157	1.5
Total votes		78,773	100.0

=== Position 2 ===
==== Candidates ====
- Liz Berry (Democratic), incumbent state representative
- Victoria Palmer (Republican)

==== Results ====
Washington's 36th State House District Position 2, 2024
Primary election
Party	Candidate	Votes	%
Democratic	Liz Berry (incumbent)	42,671	89.8
Republican	Victoria Palmer	4,737	10.0
Write-in		89	0.2
Total votes		47,497	100.0
General election
Democratic	Liz Berry (incumbent)	82,201	88.8
Republican	Victoria Palmer	10,277	11.1
Write-in		113	0.1
Total votes		92,591	100.0

== District 37 ==
=== Position 1 ===
==== Candidates ====
- Sharon Tomiko Santos (Democratic), incumbent state representative

==== Results ====
Washington's 37th State House District Position 1, 2024
Primary election
Party	Candidate	Votes	%
Democratic	Sharon Tomiko Santos (incumbent)	32,609	98.1
Write-in		620	1.9
Total votes		33,229	100.0
General election
Democratic	Sharon Tomiko Santos (incumbent)	63,074	98.3
Write-in		1,101	1.7
Total votes		64,175	100.0

=== Position 2 ===
==== Candidates ====
- Matt McCally (Libertarian)
- Chipalo Street (Democratic), incumbent state representative

==== Results ====
Washington's 37th State House District Position 2, 2024
Primary election
Party	Candidate	Votes	%
Democratic	Chipalo Street (incumbent)	33,513	93.9
Libertarian	Matt McCally	1,972	5.5
Write-in		200	0.6
Total votes		35,685	100.0
General election
Democratic	Chipalo Street (incumbent)	65,363	91.0
Libertarian	Matt McCally	6,115	8.5
Write-in		355	0.5
Total votes		71,833	100.0

== District 38 ==
=== Position 1 ===
==== Candidates ====
- Julio Cortes (Democratic), incumbent state representative
- Annie Fitzgerald (Democratic), private investigator

===== Eliminated in primary =====
- Bryce Nickel (Forward), diversity consultant

==== Endorsements ====
Julio Cortes (D)

Organizations

- Planned Parenthood

Newspapers

- The Everett Herald

==== Results ====
Washington's 38th State House District Position 1, 2024
Primary election
Party	Candidate	Votes	%
Democratic	Julio Cortes (incumbent)	17,381	61.1
Democratic	Annie Fitzgerald	5,679	20.0
Forward	Bryce Nickel	3,816	13.4
Write-in		1,562	5.5
Total votes		28,438	100.0
General election
Democratic	Julio Cortes (incumbent)	41,335	71.1
Democratic	Annie Fitzgerald	14,810	25.5
Write-in		1,975	3.4
Total votes		58,120	100.0

=== Position 2 ===
==== Candidates ====
- Marnie Claywell (Republican)
- Mary Fosse (Democratic), incumbent state representative

==== Results ====
Washington's 38th State House District Position 2, 2024
Primary election
Party	Candidate	Votes	%
Democratic	Mary Fosse (incumbent)	20,207	61.6
Republican	Marnie Claywell	12,536	38.2
Write-in		89	0.3
Total votes		32,832	100.0
General election
Democratic	Mary Fosse (incumbent)	39,209	59.5
Republican	Marnie Claywell	26,627	40.4
Write-in		106	0.2
Total votes		65,942	100.0

== District 39 ==
=== Position 1 ===
==== Candidates ====
- Sam Low (Republican), incumbent state representative
- Robert Sutherland (Republican), former state representative

===== Eliminated in primary =====
- Zephaniah Borynack (Democratic)
- Kathryn Lewandowsky (Independent), retired nurse

==== Endorsements ====
Kathryn Lewandowsky (I)

State legislators

- Maralyn Chase, former state senator
Sam Low (R)

Organizations

- Mainstream Republicans of Washington
Robert Sutherland (R)

Political parties

- 39th Legislative Republican Party
- Skagit County Republican Party
- Snohomish County Republican Party

==== Results ====
Washington's 39th State House District Position 1, 2024
Primary election
Party	Candidate	Votes	%
Republican	Sam Low (incumbent)	15,864	38.8
Republican	Robert Sutherland	11,302	27.6
Democratic	Zephaniah Borynack	7,751	19.0
No party preference	Kathryn Lewandowsky	5,935	14.5
Write-in		47	0.1
Total votes		40,899	100.0
General election
Republican	Sam Low (incumbent)	44,515	58.9
Republican	Robert Sutherland	29,909	39.6
Write-in		1,147	1.5
Total votes		75,571	100.0

=== Position 2 ===
==== Candidates ====
- Carolyn Eslick (Republican), incumbent state representative
- Jackie Huey (Republican), volunteer

==== Endorsements ====
Carolyn Eslick (R)

Organizations

- Mainstream Republicans of Washington
Jackie Huey (R)

Political parties

- 39th Legislative Republican Party
- Skagit County Republican Party
- Snohomish County Republican Party

==== Results ====
Washington's 39th State House District Position 2, 2024
Primary election
Party	Candidate	Votes	%
Republican	Carolyn Eslick (incumbent)	23,080	64.9
Republican	Jackie Huey	11,214	31.5
Write-in		1,289	3.6
Total votes		35,583	100.0
General election
Republican	Carolyn Eslick (incumbent)	45,612	62.6
Republican	Jackie Huey	25,802	35.4
Write-in		1,479	2.0
Total votes		72,893	100.0

== District 40 ==
=== Position 1 ===
==== Candidates ====
- Debra Lekanoff (Democratic), incumbent state representative

==== Results ====
Washington's 40th State House District Position 1, 2024
Primary election
Party	Candidate	Votes	%
Democratic	Debra Lekanoff (incumbent)	35,225	95.5
Write-in		1,669	4.5
Total votes		36,894	100.0
General election
Democratic	Debra Lekanoff (incumbent)	63,993	96.2
Write-in		2,565	3.9
Total votes		66,558	100.0

=== Position 2 ===
==== Candidates ====
- Alex Ramel (Democratic), incumbent state representative

==== Results ====
Washington's 40th State House District Position 2, 2024
Primary election
Party	Candidate	Votes	%
Democratic	Alex Ramel (incumbent)	34,809	95.3
Write-in		1,723	4.7
Total votes		36,532	100.0
General election
Democratic	Alex Ramel (incumbent)	63,215	95.7
Write-in		2,828	4.3
Total votes		66,043	100.0

== District 41 ==
=== Position 1 ===
==== Candidates ====
- Tana Senn (Democratic), incumbent state representative
- Emily Tadlock (Republican)

===== Eliminated in primary =====
- Stan Lippmann (Antiadministration), perennial candidate

==== Results ====
Washington's 41st State House District Position 1, 2024
Primary election
Party	Candidate	Votes	%
Democratic	Tana Senn (incumbent)	27,122	70.2
Republican	Emily Tadlock	10,719	27.8
Antiadministration	Stan Lippmann	714	1.9
Write-in		64	0.2
Total votes		38,619	100.0
General election
Democratic	Tana Senn (incumbent)	50,823	67.5
Republican	Emily Tadlock	24,305	32.3
Write-in		124	0.2
Total votes		75,252	100.0

=== Position 2 ===
==== Candidates ====
- Al Rosenthal (Republican)
- My-Linh Thai (Democratic), incumbent state representative

===== Eliminated in primary =====
- Pamela J. Randolph (Republican)

==== Results ====
Washington's 41st State House District Position 2, 2024
Primary election
Party	Candidate	Votes	%
Democratic	My-Linh Thai (incumbent)	26,509	68.6
Republican	Al Rosenthal	7,157	18.5
Republican	Pamela J. Randolph	4,938	12.8
Write-in		40	0.1
Total votes		38,644	100.0
General election
Democratic	My-Linh Thai (incumbent)	49,577	65.7
Republican	Al Rosenthal	25,821	34.2
Write-in		72	0.1
Total votes		75,470	100.0

== District 42 ==
=== Position 1 ===
==== Candidates ====
- Raymond Pelletti (Republican), real estate broker
- Alicia Rule (Democratic), incumbent state representative

===== Eliminated in primary =====
- Janet Melman (Democratic), voice actor and comic book author

==== Endorsements ====
Janet Melman (D)

Organizations

- Washington Stonewall Democrats
Alicia Rule (D)

Political parties

- 42nd Legislative Democrats

Unions

- Washington Education Association

==== Results ====
Washington's 42nd State House District Position 1, 2024
Primary election
Party	Candidate	Votes	%
Democratic	Alicia Rule (incumbent)	22,752	46.6
Republican	Raymond Pelletti	22,336	45.7
Democratic	Janet Melman	3,720	7.6
Write-in		42	0.1
Total votes		48,850	100.0
General election
Democratic	Alicia Rule (incumbent)	49,802	55.4
Republican	Raymond Pelletti	40,090	44.6
Write-in		86	0.1
Total votes		89,978	100.0

=== Position 2 ===
==== Candidates ====
- Kamal Bhachu (Republican), hospital engineer
- Joe Timmons (Democratic), incumbent state representative

==== Endorsements ====
Kamal Bhachu (R)

State legislators

- Luanne Van Werven, former state representative
Joe Timmons (D)

State executive officers

- Jay Inslee, Governor of Washington

Political parties

- 42nd Legislative Democrats

Tribes

- Lummi Nation

==== Results ====
Washington's 42nd State House District Position 2, 2024
Primary election
Party	Candidate	Votes	%
Democratic	Joe Timmons (incumbent)	25,741	52.7
Republican	Kamal Bhachu	23,012	47.1
Write-in		59	0.1
Total votes		48,812	100.0
General election
Democratic	Joe Timmons (incumbent)	47,947	53.3
Republican	Kamal Bhachu	41,894	46.6
Write-in		72	0.1
Total votes		89,913	100.0

== District 43 ==
=== Position 1 ===
==== Candidates ====
- Nicole Macri (Democratic), incumbent state representative

==== Results ====
Washington's 43rd State House District Position 1, 2024
Primary election
Party	Candidate	Votes	%
Democratic	Nicole Macri (incumbent)	31,014	98.0
Write-in		619	2.0
Total votes		31,633	100.0
General election
Democratic	Nicole Macri (incumbent)	65,596	98.5
Write-in		1,015	1.5
Total votes		66,611	100.0

=== Position 2 ===
The incumbent is Democrat Frank Chopp, who retired.

==== Candidates ====
- Shaun Scott (Democratic), lobbyist
- Andrea Suarez (Democratic), executive director of We Heart Seattle

===== Eliminated in primary =====
- Daniel Carusello (Democratic), tech account manager and former intern for the Washington Republican Party

===== Withdrawn =====
- Stephanie LLoyd-Agnew (Democratic)

==== Endorsements ====
Daniel Carusello (D)

Newspapers

- The Seattle Times
Shaun Scott (D)

State legislators

- Frank Chopp, incumbent state representative

Newspapers

- The Stranger

==== Results ====
Washington's 43rd State House District Position 2, 2024
Primary election
Party	Candidate	Votes	%
Democratic	Shaun Scott	20,846	59.1
Democratic	Andrea Suarez	7,133	20.2
Democratic	Daniel Carusello	5,743	16.3
Democratic	Stephanie LLoyd-Agnew (Note: LLoyd-Agnew withdrew from the race, yet remained on the primary ballot.)	1,269	3.6
Write-in		276	0.78
Total votes		35,267	100.0
General election
Democratic	Shaun Scott	49,990	68.4
Democratic	Andrea Suarez	22,506	30.8
Write-in		554	0.8
Total votes		73,050	100.0

== District 44 ==
=== Position 1 ===
==== Candidates ====
- Brandy Donaghy (Democratic), incumbent state representative

==== Results ====
Washington's 44th State House District Position 1, 2024
Primary election
Party	Candidate	Votes	%
Democratic	Brandy Donaghy (incumbent)	25,127	92.3
Write-in		2,096	7.7
Total votes		27,223	100.0
General election
Democratic	Brandy Donaghy (incumbent)	51,557	93.6
Write-in		3,531	6.4
Total votes		55,088	100.0

=== Position 2 ===
==== Candidates ====
- April Berg (Democratic), incumbent state representative
- Sam Sim (Republican), entrepreneur and ordained deacon

==== Endorsements ====
Sam Sim (R)

Political parties

- Snohomish County Republicans
- 38th Legislative Republicans
- 39th Legislative Republicans
- 44th Legislative Republicans

Organizations

- Washington Young Republicans

==== Results ====
Washington's 44th State House District Position 2, 2024
Primary election
Party	Candidate	Votes	%
Democratic	April Berg (incumbent)	22,206	59.1
Republican	Sam Sim	15,352	40.8
Write-in		43	0.1
Total votes		37,601	100.0
General election
Democratic	April Berg (incumbent)	43,155	57.6
Republican	Sam Sim	31,714	42.3
Write-in		62	0.1
Total votes		74,931	100.0

== District 45 ==
=== Position 1 ===
==== Candidates ====
- Roger Goodman (Democratic), incumbent state representative

==== Results ====
Washington's 45th State House District Position 1, 2024
Primary election
Party	Candidate	Votes	%
Democratic	Roger Goodman (incumbent)	29,936	95.6
Write-in		1,394	4.5
Total votes		31,330	100.0
General election
Democratic	Roger Goodman (incumbent)	58,368	96.0
Write-in		2,424	4.0
Total votes		60,792	100.0

=== Position 2 ===
==== Candidates ====
- Melissa Demyan (Democratic), activist
- Larry Springer (Democratic), incumbent state representative

==== Results ====
Washington's 45th State House District Position 2, 2024
Primary election
Party	Candidate	Votes	%
Democratic	Larry Springer (incumbent)	16,904	49.3
Democratic	Melissa Demyan	16,405	47.9
Write-in		968	2.8
Total votes		34,277	100.0
General election
Democratic	Larry Springer (incumbent)	38,347	55.6
Democratic	Melissa Demyan	29,191	42.3
Write-in		1,478	2.1
Total votes		69,016	100.0

== District 46 ==
=== Position 1 ===
==== Candidates ====
- Beth Daranciang (Republican)
- Gerry Pollet (Democratic), incumbent state representative

===== Eliminated in primary =====
- Ahndylyn Kinney (Democratic)

==== Endorsements ====
Gerry Pollet (D)

Newspapers

- The Seattle Times

==== Results ====
Washington's 46th State House District Position 1, 2024
Primary election
Party	Candidate	Votes	%
Democratic	Gerry Pollet (incumbent)	36,545	83.2
Republican	Beth Daranciang	4,464	10.2
Democratic	Ahndylyn Kinney	2,853	6.5
Write-in		75	0.2
Total votes		43,937	100.0
General election
Democratic	Gerry Pollet (incumbent)	72,727	87.4
Republican	Beth Daranciang	10,353	12.4
Write-in		117	0.1
Total votes		83,197	100.0

=== Position 2 ===
==== Candidates ====
- Simone Barron (Republican)
- Darya Farivar (Democratic), incumbent state representative

==== Results ====
Washington's 46th State House District Position 2, 2024
Primary election
Party	Candidate	Votes	%
Democratic	Darya Farivar (incumbent)	38,269	88.5
Republican	Simone Barron	4,870	11.3
Write-in		88	0.2
Total votes		43,227	100.0
General election
Democratic	Darya Farivar (incumbent)	70,952	86.5
Republican	Simone Barron	10,832	13.2
Write-in		248	0.3
Total votes		82,032	100.0

== District 47 ==
=== Position 1 ===
==== Candidates ====
- Debra Entenman (Democratic), incumbent state representative
- Kyle Lyebyedyev (Republican)

==== Results ====
Washington's 47th State House District Position 1, 2024
Primary election
Party	Candidate	Votes	%
Democratic	Debra Entenman (incumbent)	17,093	57.3
Republican	Kyle Lyebyedyev	12,678	42.5
Write-in		59	0.2
Total votes		29,830	100.0
General election
Democratic	Debra Entenman (incumbent)	35,528	56.3
Republican	Kyle Lyebyedyev	27,513	43.6
Write-in		106	0.2
Total votes		63,147	100.0

=== Position 2 ===
==== Candidates ====
- Ted Cooke (Republican)
- Chris Stearns (Democratic), incumbent state representative

===== Eliminated in primary =====
- Brian Lott (Republican)

==== Endorsements ====
Chris Stearns (D)

Newspapers

- The Seattle Times

==== Results ====
Washington's 47th State House District Position 2, 2024
Primary election
Party	Candidate	Votes	%
Democratic	Chris Stearns (incumbent)	16,433	55.1
Republican	Ted Cooke	8,474	28.4
Republican	Brian Lott	4,908	16.4
Write-in		37	0.1
Total votes		29,852	100.0
General election
Democratic	Chris Stearns (incumbent)	35,085	55.6
Republican	Ted Cooke	27,870	44.2
Write-in		101	0.2
Total votes		63,056	100.0

== District 48 ==
=== Position 1 ===
==== Candidates ====
- Vandana Slatter (Democratic), incumbent state representative
- Lynn Trinh (Republican)

==== Results ====
Washington's 48th State House District Position 1, 2024
Primary election
Party	Candidate	Votes	%
Democratic	Vandana Slatter (incumbent)	19,868	71.5
Republican	Lynn Trinh	7,886	28.4
Write-in		45	0.2
Total votes		27,799	100.0
General election
Democratic	Vandana Slatter (incumbent)	39,645	68.3
Republican	Lynn Trinh	18,330	31.6
Write-in		94	0.2
Total votes		58,069	100.0

=== Position 2 ===
==== Candidates ====
- Amy Walen (Democratic), incumbent state representative

==== Results ====
Washington's 48th State House District Position 2, 2024
Primary election
Party	Candidate	Votes	%
Democratic	Amy Walen (incumbent)	21,069	95.9
Write-in		905	4.1
Total votes		21,974	100.0
General election
Democratic	Amy Walen (incumbent)	43,664	95.7
Write-in		1,945	4.3
Total votes		45,609	100.0

== District 49 ==
=== Position 1 ===
==== Candidates ====
- Brett Graham (Republican)
- Sharon Wylie (Democratic), incumbent state representative

==== Results ====
Washington's 49th State House District Position 1, 2024
Primary election
Party	Candidate	Votes	%
Democratic	Sharon Wylie (incumbent)	20,533	64.3
Republican	Brett Graham	11,322	35.5
Write-in		65	0.2
Total votes		31,920	100.0
General election
Democratic	Sharon Wylie (incumbent)	43,234	63.5
Republican	Brett Graham	24,741	36.3
Write-in		139	0.2
Total votes		68,114	100.0

=== Position 2 ===
==== Candidates ====
- Russell Barber (Republican), software engineer
- Monica Stonier (Democratic), incumbent state representative

===== Eliminated in primary =====
- Justin Forsman (Republican), perennial candidate

==== Results ====
Washington's 49th State House District Position 2, 2024
Primary election
Party	Candidate	Votes	%
Democratic	Monica Stonier (incumbent)	20,277	63.7
Republican	Russell Barber	6,036	19.0
Republican	Justin Forsman	5,463	17.2
Write-in		79	0.3
Total votes		31,855	100.0
General election
Democratic	Monica Stonier (incumbent)	42,950	63.1
Republican	Russell Barber	24,997	36.7
Write-in		152	0.2
Total votes		68,099	100.0
