= Kathy Haigh =

American politician from Washington

Member of the Washington House of Representatives from the 35th district
- In office January 11, 1999 – January 12, 2015
- Preceded by: Margaret "Peggy" Johnson
- Succeeded by: Dan Griffey

Personal details
- Born: December 3, 1950 (age 75)
- Party: Democratic
- Profession: Veterinarian

Kathryn M. Haigh (born December 3, 1950) is an American veterinarian and Democratic Party member of the Washington House of Representatives, representing the 35th district.
