= Kelly Chambers =

Kelly Chambers may refer to:

- Kelly Chambers (footballer), English footballer and manager
- Kelly Chambers (politician), American politician and businesswoman
