= Debbie Regala =

American politician from Washington

Member of the Washington Senate from the 27th district
- In office January 8, 2001 – January 14, 2013
- Preceded by: R. Lorraine Wojahn
- Succeeded by: Jeannie Darneille

Member of the Washington House of Representatives from the 27th district
- In office December 2, 1994 – January 8, 2001
- Preceded by: Art Wang
- Succeeded by: Jeannie Darneille

Personal details
- Born: April 27, 1945 (age 81) Tacoma, Washington, U.S.
- Party: Democratic
- Children: 3
- Education: University of Puget Sound (BA)

Debbie E. Regala (born April 27, 1945) is an American politician who served as a member of the Washington State Legislature from 1995 to 2013.

== Early life and education ==
Regala was born in Tacoma, Washington. She earned a Bachelor of Arts degree in education and foreign languages from the University of Puget Sound in 1968.

== Career ==
Regala has served as a member of the Washington House of Representatives from 1995 to 2000. She served in the Washington State Senate from 2001 to 2013. In 2003, she was appointed Assistant Democratic Floor Leader and in 2005, she was elected Majority Whip.

== Personal life ==
Regala lives in Tacoma, Washington. She and her husband have three children.
