= Jeannie Darneille =

American politician (born 1949)

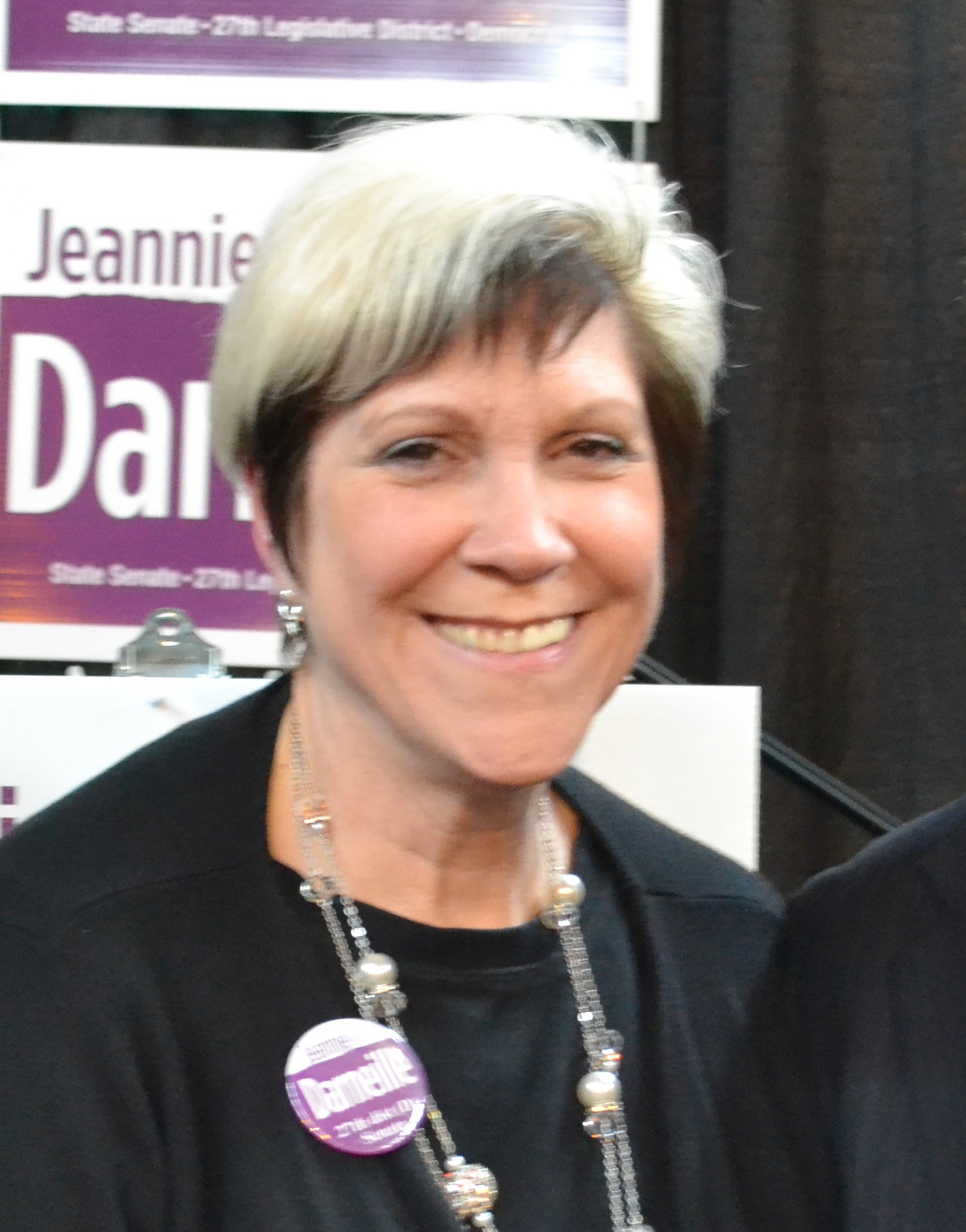

Member of the Washington Senate from the 27th district
- In office January 14, 2013 – November 4, 2021
- Preceded by: Debbie Regala
- Succeeded by: Yasmin Trudeau

Member of the Washington House of Representatives from the 27th district
- In office January 8, 2001 – January 14, 2013
- Preceded by: Debbie Regala
- Succeeded by: Jake Fey

Personal details
- Born: July 9, 1949 (age 77) Fairbanks, Alaska, U.S.
- Party: Democratic
- Education: Western Washington University (BA); Colorado State University (MEd)

Jeanne L. Darneille (born July 9, 1949) is an American politician and educator who served as a member of the Washington State Senate, representing the 27th district from 2013 until her resignation in 2021. A member of the Democratic Party, she previously served as a member of the Washington House of Representatives from 2001 to 2013.

== Early life and education ==
Darneille a native of Fairbanks, Alaska, the oldest of six children. Darneille's father was a member of the United States Air Force. After high school, she attended Tacoma Community College. Darneille earned a Bachelor of Arts degree in art history from Western Washington University and a Master of education administration from the Colorado State University.

== Career ==
Darneille worked as a volunteer at Planned Parenthood in Bellingham, Washington. She served as Executive Director for the Hospitality House Shelter for Women and Interim Executive Director for United Cerebral Palsy of South Puget Sound. She was Vice Chair of the Pierce County Democratic Central Committee and served as a legislative aide to former State Senator R. Lorraine Wojahn.

Darneille was elected to the Washington House of Representatives from the 27th district in 2001, serving until 2013. In 2012, she was elected to the Washington State Senate. She assumed office in 2013.

She was selected to run the Department of Correction's (DOC) Women's Prison Division on September 21, 2021, starting fall 2021.
