= Ezequiel Morfin =

American politician

Member-elect of the Washington House of Representatives from the 14th district
- Assuming office January 2027
- Succeeding: Deb Manjarrez

Personal details
- Party: Democratic

Ezequiel Morfin is an American politician. A member of the Democratic Party, he is the member-elect for the 14th district of the Washington House of Representatives.
