= Washington State Three Percenters =

Right-wing militia organization

The Washington State Three Percenters is a right-wing organization in the U.S. state of Washington. The group itself rejects this label, and states that they are primarily engaged in charitable work. The group is also involved in organizing gun rights demonstrations.

The group has publicly collaborated with the John Brown Gun Club, a far-left group, although this affiliation ended in mid-2019 under disputed circumstances.

Following criticisms leveled at a prominent member group during a 2019 city council election, the group announced that they had split from the paramilitary national Three Percenters organization years prior.

== Activities ==
The Washington State Three Percenters was formed as an offshoot of the paramilitary Patriot movement. Founded by Matt Marshall, the group denies being a paramilitary group and has stated that their primary activities are engaging in charitable and emergency preparedness work. Activities in this vein have included raising money for civil infrastructure and homeless veterans. The group also regularly organizes gun rights rallies and has been a vocal supporter of Washington State Republican politician Matt Shea.

In January 2019, the Washington State Three Percenters coordinated with the Puget Sound chapter of the John Brown Gun Club to oppose racist flyering conducted by the White Supremacist group Patriot Front, following several months of having engaged in dialogue at rallies. The groups ended their collaborative efforts in July 2019. According to the John Brown Gun Club, this split was due to the Three Percenters' support for Matt Shea and concerns about the group's continuing affiliation with far-right individuals and media. According to the Three Percenters, the primary cause for the split was insensitive comments made by some of their membership following the 2019 ICE firebombing attack in Tacoma, which had been perpetrated by a former member of the John Brown Gun Club. According to Marshall, "The true neo-Nazis hate us, which they should because we hate them too, and the far left, who we don't have any problems with, hate us because they believe that we're neo-Nazis".

During an election in 2019, Washington State Democrats issued a statement against Chris Wisnoski, a prominent member of the Three Percenters and then-incumbent city council member in Black Diamond, describing the group as a far-right militia. The Three Percenters denied being a militia and claimed to have severed ties with the national Three Percenters organization years prior.

On June 27, 2020, the Washington State Three Percenters held a rally in Olympia named "March for Our Rights". Sacha Baron Cohen crashed the event disguised as a country singer and attempted to lead the crowd in a racist singalong with mixed results, with some audience members singing along, but others being hostile and driving him off the stage. Organizers of the rally accused Baron Cohen of gaining their trust by financially sponsoring the event.

== See also ==
- Three Percenters
