= Michael Keaton (politician) =

American politician

Member of the Washington House of Representatives from the 25th district
- Incumbent
- Assumed office January 13, 2025 Serving with Cyndy Jacobsen
- Preceded by: Kelly Chambers

Personal details
- Party: Republican
- Education: University of Washington (BA); Embry-Riddle Aeronautical University (MS)
- Website: Legislative website

Michael D. Keaton is an American politician serving in the Washington House of Representatives.

== Early life and education ==
Keaton grew up near SeaTac Airport. He graduated with a Bachelor of Arts from the University of Washington. He also has a Masters of Aerospace Sciences from Embry-Riddle Aeronautical University.

== Career ==
Keaton served as a combat fighter pilot for the U.S. Air Force from 1985 - 2005. He has worked as a manager at Raytheon.

He served on the Puyallup School Board from 2015 - 2023.

On January 13, 2025, Keaton was sworn in as a member of the Washington House of Representatives, representing the 25th district.

== Personal life ==
He is married to Michelle Keaton.
