= Deb Manjarrez =

American politician

Member of the Washington House of Representatives from the 14th district
- Incumbent
- Assumed office January 13, 2025 Serving with Gloria Mendoza
- Preceded by: Gina Mosbrucker
- Succeeded by: Ezequiel Morfin (elect)

Personal details
- Born: 1959 - 1960 Wapato, Washington, U.S.
- Party: Republican
- Spouse: Mark E. Manjarrez
- Education: Central Washington University (BA)
- Occupation: politician farmer accountant

Deb Manjarrez is an American politician, farmer, and accountant. In 2024, she was elected to serve in the Washington House of Representatives.

== Early life and education ==
Manjarrez was born and raised in Wapato, Washington. Manjarrez is the fourth generation of her family to work in farming and owns the farm that has been in her family since the 1940s with her husband Mark. She graduated from Wapato High School and earned a bachelor of arts degree from Central Washington University.

Manjarrez is a certified public accountant.

== Political career ==
Manjarrez served as president of the Wapato Chamber of Commerce for ten years and served as chairman of the Yakima County Republican Central Committee. She was also a Republican state committeewoman.

=== Washington House of Representatives ===
She ran in the 2024 Washington House of Representatives election to fill the seat of Gina Mosbrucker, who retired. In the primary election, she faced two challengers, Democrat Ana Ruiz Kennedy and independent Eddie Perez, with Manjarrez and Kennedy advancing to the general. Menjarrez defeated Kennedy, receiving 51% of the votes.
