= Richard DeBolt =

American politician (born 1965)

Minority Leader of the Washington House of Representatives
- In office January 9, 2006 – January 13, 2014
- Preceded by: Bruce Chandler
- Succeeded by: Dan Kristiansen
- In office January 12, 2004 – January 10, 2005
- Preceded by: Cathy McMorris Rodgers
- Succeeded by: Bruce Chandler

Member of the Washington House of Representatives from the 20th, Position 1 district
- In office January 13, 1997 – January 11, 2021
- Preceded by: David J. Chappell
- Succeeded by: Peter Abbarno

Personal details
- Born: Richard Charles DeBolt; November 3, 1965 (age 60) Tacoma, Washington, U.S.
- Party: Republican

Richard Charles DeBolt (born November 3, 1965) is an American politician of the Republican Party. He was a member of the Washington House of Representatives, representing the 20th district from 1997 to 2021. He was House Republican Leader from 2004 to 2005 and again from 2006 to 2013.

== Political career ==
DeBolt was first elected to office in 1996. He ran for office with the goal of focusing on economic development and business-friendly policies, and he has said that increased employment is key to solving issues such as uninsured residents.

In 2006, he was re-elected minority leader over Mike Armstrong and Bruce Chandler after the Democratic Party won a 62-36 majority in the House. He held this position until 2014 when he stepped down due to health issues.

In 2012, the Washington Supreme Court ordered the State Legislature to fully fund K-12 public education in the McCleary v. Washington decision. Although the Legislature increased funding, they did not fully comply with the mandate and, two years later, were found to be in contempt. This was a campaign issue in the 2014 election, with DeBolt pledging not to institute new taxes to fund schools, in contrast with his opponent. DeBolt argued that the State Supreme Court's actions were politically motivated and represented a violation of the separation of powers, and he sponsored a bill to require State Supreme Court Justice candidates to declare their political party while running for office.

In 2013, DeBolt was selected to be the Ranking Republican on the House Capital Budget Committee, a position he held until his retirement from the legislature.

In 2019, in response to Governor Jay Inslee's proposed climate change legislation, DeBolt sponsored the Carbon Free Washington Act, which would provide financial incentives to businesses to reduce carbon use. He argued that providing incentives would lead to a better result than instituting mandates.

After 24 years in office, he retired from the House in 2021 and became Executive Director of the Lewis Economic Development Council.

== Personal life ==
DeBolt was born in 1965 in Tacoma, Washington, to a military family. After graduating from Cheyenne East High School, he studied International relations at University of Wyoming. In 1989, he married his wife, Amy, with whom he has two children, Sophie and Austin.

He has been involved with United Way of Lewis County, including serving as a board member and securing $3 million of funding for a pre-school.

== Awards ==
- 2014 Guardians of Small Business award from the NFIB
- 2018 City Champion Award from the Association of Washington Cities
- 2020 Guardians of Small Business from the NFIB

Washington House of Representatives
Preceded by Bruce Chandler	Minority Leader of the Washington House of Representatives; 2006–2014	Succeeded by Dan Kristiansen
