= Yasmin Trudeau =

American politician

Member of the Washington State Senate from the 27th district
- Incumbent
- Assumed office November 4, 2021
- Preceded by: Jeannie Darneille

Personal details
- Born: Yasmin Ayesha Christopher; 1983 or 1984 (age 42–43) Bangladesh
- Party: Democratic
- Education: Evergreen State College (BA); Seattle University (JD)
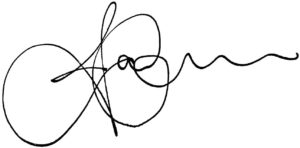
- Signature

Yasmin Ayesha Christopher Trudeau (born 1983 or 1984) is an American lawyer and politician serving as a member of the Washington State Senate, representing the 27th district since 2021. A member of the Democratic Party, she was appointed to the Senate by the Pierce County Council in November 2021 to fill a vacancy created by the resignation of Senator Jeannie Darneille voted in on Aug 2, 2022 officially after her appointment. In 2025, she proposed a bill that would recognize the Islamic holidays of Eid al-Fitr and Eid al-Adha in Washington. She graduated from Seattle University School of Law in 2014.
