= Dan Kristiansen =

American politician from Washington

Minority Leader of the Washington House of Representatives
- In office January 13, 2014 – March 9, 2018
- Preceded by: Richard DeBolt
- Succeeded by: J. T. Wilcox

Member of the Washington House of Representatives from the 39th, Position 1 district
- In office January 13, 2003 – January 14, 2019
- Preceded by: Hans Dunshee
- Succeeded by: Robert Sutherland

Personal details
- Born: December 13, 1962 (age 63) Snohomish County, Washington, U.S.
- Party: Republican
- Education: Shoreline Community College

Daniel P. Kristiansen (born December 13, 1962) is a former American politician of the Republican Party. He was a member of the Washington House of Representatives, representing the 39th district, and the former House Minority Leader.

== Career ==
In 2000, Kristiansen lost his first election to Democrat Hans Dunshee. He was elected as the State Representative of the 39th Legislative District two years later. In 2013, he was selected to be Republican Minority Leader.

Kristiansen has advocated for the interests of small businesses. He has opposed government regulations, saying that they harm businesses and have "decimated" rural Washington.

On March 6, 2018, Kristiansen announced he would not seek re-election.

== Controversy ==
=== Campaign finances ===
In 2010, Washington State officials received a formal complaint regarding Representative Kristiansen's campaign finances. According to state law, contributions from a single business were legally capped at $1600 per election. The Rairdon Auto Group, however, contributed four times that amount. This was accomplished by writing 4 separate checks for $1600, with each originating from 4 different Rairdon dealership locations. The dealerships shared ownership and board members, and the donations bore identical dates. During Representative Kristiansen's 2010 campaign for the legislature, the independence of the dealerships was called into question, as well as the legality of using multiple business locations to circumvent campaign contribution limits.

In 2009, shortly before receiving campaign contributions from the Rairdon Auto Group, Representative Kristiansen cosponsored HB 2182. The purpose of HB 2182 was to reduce business and operations taxes for automotive dealers and automotive service providers. Legislative documents describe HB 2182 as "AN ACT Relating to reducing the business and occupation tax rate for retailers, wholesalers, and service providers of motor vehicles" and an amendment of RCW 82.04.860.

=== Gun regulations ===
In 2016, Dan Kristiansen received $1,950 from the National Rifle Association of America during WA House Dist. 39, Snohomish race.

In response to the Parkland high school shooting which killed 17 people, new gun regulations were proposed by the State Legislature. On February 20, 2018, while arguing against the legislation, Kristiansen told the media that "More people are actually killed by knives than by guns." Kristiansen then told a fictitious story about a knife attack in Norway that he claimed took the lives of two dozen children at a youth camp. His remarks were critiqued by The Seattle Times which noted a 2016 report which recorded 18 homicides by knife versus 95 homicides by firearms in Washington State. Kristiansen acknowledged that he had “mixed up some things.”

== Personal life ==
Kristiansen was born on December 13, 1962, in Lynwood, Washington. He attended Shorecrest High School and Shoreline Community College. In 1985, he married his wife Janis, with whom he has 3 children. He is a Christian.

== Awards ==
- 2014 Guardians of Small Business award. Presented by NFIB.

Washington House of Representatives
Preceded by Richard DeBolt	Minority Leader of the Washington House of Representatives; 2014–2018	Succeeded by J. T. Wilcox
