= Matt Marshall (politician) =

American politician

Member of the Washington House of Representatives from the 2nd district
- Incumbent
- Assumed office January 13, 2025 Serving with Andrew Barkis
- Preceded by: J. T. Wilcox

Personal details
- Party: Republican

Matt Marshall is an American politician. He is a member of the Washington House of Representatives from the 2nd district.

== Life and career ==
Marshall is a former Eatonville school board member. He founded the Washington State Three Percenters.

In August 2024, Marshall defeated Yanah Cook and Michael Holloman in the nonpartisan primary election for the 2nd district of the Washington House of Representatives. In November 2024, he defeated John Snaza in the general election, winning 55 percent of the votes. He succeeded J. T. Wilcox. He assumes office on January 13, 2025.
