= April Berg =

American politician from Washington

Member of the Washington House of Representatives from the 44th district
- Incumbent
- Assumed office January 11, 2021 Serving with Brandy Donaghy
- Preceded by: Jared Mead

Personal details
- Born: April Nowak; March 4, 1974 (age 52) Chicago, Illinois
- Party: Democratic

April Berg (née Nowak, born March 4, 1974) is an American politician of the Democratic Party. In 2020, she was elected to the Washington House of Representatives to represent the 44th legislative district and took office on January 11, 2021.

== Millionaires' tax ==
In the 2026 legislative session, Berg was one of the sponsors of Governor Bob Ferguson's proposed tax on households with incomes over $1 million.
