= Washington's 44th legislative district =

Coordinates: 47°56′N 122°6′W

Map of Washington's 44th legislative district

Washington's 44th legislative district is one of forty-nine districts in Washington state for representation in the state legislature.

The district covers a large area mostly east of Everett, including the cities of Maltby, Mill Creek and Snohomish.

The district's legislators include state senator John Lovick and two state representatives, Brandy Donaghy (position 1) and April Berg (position 2), all of whom are members of the Democratic Party. Lovick, Donaghy and Berg are all Black, even though the district is 60% Caucasian, and only 2% Black.

This seat was once held by future U.S. Senator Maria Cantwell, from January 12, 1987, to January 3, 1993.

== See also ==
- Washington Redistricting Commission
- Washington State Legislature
- Washington State Senate
- Washington House of Representatives
- Washington (state) legislative districts
