= Washington's 38th legislative district =

Coordinates: 48°1′N 122°10′W

Map of Washington's 38th legislative district

Washington's 38th legislative district is one of forty-nine districts in Washington state for representation in the state legislature.

The district's legislators are state senator June Robinson and state representatives Julio Cortes (position 1) and Mary Fosse (position 2), all Democrats.

== See also ==
- Washington Redistricting Commission
- Washington State Legislature
- Washington State Senate
- Washington House of Representatives
