= Brian Burnett (politician) =

American politician (born 1968)

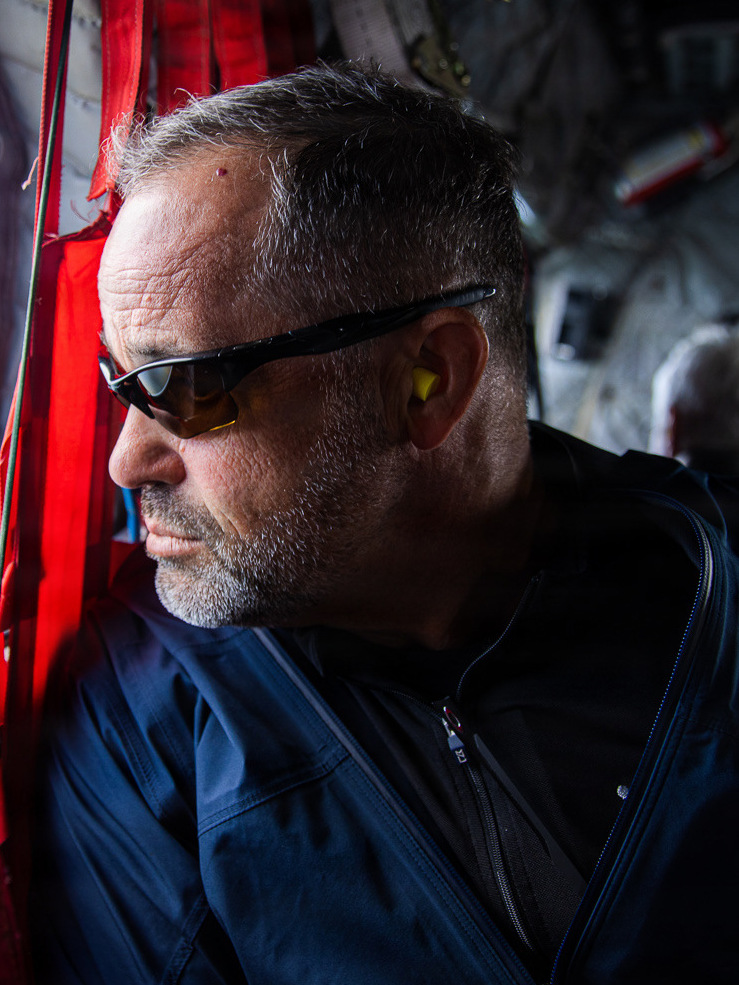

Member of the Washington House of Representatives from the 12th district
- Incumbent
- Assumed office January 15, 2025 Serving with Mike Steele
- Preceded by: Keith Goehner

Personal details
- Born: Brian K. Burnett; 1968 (age 57–58)
- Party: Republican
- Spouse: April Burnett
- Children: 7

Brian K. Burnett (born 1968) is an American politician and former law enforcement officer. In 2024, he was elected to represent the 12th district in Washington's House of Representatives.

== Career ==
=== Chelan County Sheriff ===
Burnett worked in law enforcement for 25 years. He served three terms as Chelan County sheriff before losing his reelection campaign in 2022. Under his leadership, the Chelan County sheriff's office started their Behavior Health Unit for emergency calls related to mental health crises.

While serving as Chelan County Sheriff, Burnett was one of thirty-nine plaintiffs in a 2020 lawsuit against then-governor Jay Inslee, seeking to end the COVID-19 state of emergency, citing the need for local control and economic concerns. In 2021, Burnett suspended School Resource Officer (SRO) programs in four school districts, opposing Inslee's COVID-19 vaccine mandate for school employees and contractors. Burnett, who noted that no SROs had expressed concerns about the mandate, argued it violated personal rights. SROs were reassigned to patrol duties, with efforts to maintain a visible presence near schools.

Former deputies named Burnett as perpetrator in lawsuits claiming religious discrimination, unfair employment practices and retaliation.

=== Washington House of Representatives ===
During the 2024 election, Burnett was elected to represent the 12th district in the Washington House of Representatives. He received 53.26% of the vote in the general election.

== Personal life ==
Burnett resides in Wenatchee, Washington, with his wife, April. They have seven children and eight grandchildren.

He is Christian.
