= Adison Richards =

American politician

Member of the Washington House of Representatives from the 26th district
- Incumbent
- Assumed office January 13, 2025 Serving with Michelle Caldier
- Preceded by: Spencer Hutchins

Personal details
- Party: Democratic
- Occupation: Nonprofit attorney

Adison Richards is an American politician and nonprofit attorney who is a member of the Washington House of Representatives representing the state's 26th district, Position 1. A member of the Democratic Party, Richards took office on January 13, 2025. He serves with Michelle Caldier Valdez.

== Early life and education ==
Richards grew up in the 26th district as the son of a teacher and small landscaping business owner. He graduated from Peninsula High School and has lived in various parts of the district including Fox Island and Bremerton.

== Career ==
Richards works as a nonprofit attorney and has been active in community service, including volunteering as a cross-country coach and working with the local NAACP chapter. He has advocated for issues including affordable housing, environmental protection, and public education funding.

== Political career ==
=== Washington House of Representatives ===
==== 2024 election ====
Richards won election to the Washington House of Representatives in 2024. In the August 6 primary election, he received 49.6% of the vote in a field of three candidates. He went on to win the general election on November 5, defeating Republican Jesse L. Young with 51.6% of the vote to Young's 48.2%.

During the campaign, Richards earned endorsements from several organizations and publications including The News Tribune, which praised him as "level-headed and pragmatic" with a history of reaching across party lines.

==== 2022 election ====
Richards previously ran for the same seat in 2022 but was defeated in the general election by Republican Spencer Hutchins. In that race, Richards advanced from the primary with 50.1% of the vote but lost the general election with 49.5% to Hutchins's 50.5%.

=== Campaign financing ===
During the 2024 election cycle (January 1, 2023 - October 15, 2024), Richards's campaign raised $569,709 from 954 unique contributors and spent $540,166. Major contributors included the Washington State Democratic Central Committee ($121,948), House Democratic Campaign Committee ($113,057), and Washington Senate Democratic Campaign ($75,803).

== Political positions ==
Richards supports progressive policies while emphasizing bipartisan cooperation and community-based solutions. He advocates for affordable housing initiatives, environmental protection measures, public education funding, and addressing public safety through community-oriented approaches.

Richards has also indicated advocacy for better public safety, hiring more police officers in the district, government efficiency, and against new tax proposals.
