= Brandy Donaghy =

American politician in Washington

Member of the Washington House of Representatives from the 44th district
- Incumbent
- Assumed office December 15, 2021 Serving with April Berg
- Preceded by: John Lovick

Personal details
- Born: 1972 or 1973 (age 52–53)
- Party: Democratic

Brandy Donaghy (born 1972 or 1973) is an American politician serving as a member of the Washington House of Representatives, representing the 44th district since 2021. A member of the Democratic Party, she was appointed to the House by the Snohomish County Council in December 2021 to fill a vacancy created by the resignation of Representative John Lovick. Donaghy also ran for the Snohomish County Council in 2021 against incumbent Republican Sam Low.

== Electoral history ==
=== 2019 ===
2019 South County Regional Fire Authority Commissioner, Dist. 5 General Election results
Party	Candidate	Votes	%
Nonpartisan	Jim Kenny (incumbent)	22,662	70.33
Nonpartisan	Brandy Donaghy	9,445	29.31
Write-in		117	0.36
Total votes		32,224	100.00%

=== 2021 ===
2021 Snohomish County Council, District 5 General Election results
Party	Candidate	Votes	%
Republican	Sam Low (incumbent)	25,381	60.59
Democratic	Brandy Donaghy	16,474	39.33
Write-in		33	0.08
Total votes		41,888	100.00%
Republican hold			

=== 2022 ===
2022 Washington State House of Representatives, District 44 General Election results
Party	Candidate	Votes	%
Democratic	Brandy Donaghy (incumbent)	33,603	53.33
Republican	Mark Harmsworth	29,362	46.60
Write-in		42	0.07
Total votes		63,007	100.00%
Democratic hold			
