= Jake Fey =

American politician

Member of the Washington House of Representatives from the 27th district
- Incumbent
- Assumed office January 14, 2013 Serving with Laurie Jinkins
- Preceded by: Jeannie Darneille

Personal details
- Born: Jacob Carl Fey; 1949 (age 76–77) Port Angeles, Washington, U.S.
- Party: Democratic
- Spouse: Janine Fey
- Children: 2
- Education: University of Washington (BA); University of Puget Sound (MPA)

Jacob Carl Fey (born 1949) is an American politician serving as a member of the Washington House of Representatives, representing the 27th district. A member of the Democratic Party, Fey assumed office on January 14, 2013.

== Early life and education ==
Fey was born and raised in Port Angeles, Washington. He earned a Bachelor of Arts in political science from the University of Washington and a Master of Public Administration from the University of Puget Sound.

== Career ==
Fey served as the director of the Washington State University Energy program from 2001 to 2019. He also served as a member of the Sound Transit and Pierce Transit boards. Fey was a member of the Tacoma City Council and served as deputy mayor of Tacoma, Washington. Fey is a progressive.

== Awards ==
- 2021 City Champion Awards. Presented by Association of Washington Cities (AWC).
