= Cyndy Jacobsen =

American politician (born 1960)

Member of the Washington House of Representatives from the 25th district
- Incumbent
- Assumed office January 11, 2021 Serving with Kelly Chambers
- Preceded by: Chris Gildon

Personal details
- Born: Cynthia P. Morgan; June 14, 1960 (age 66) Seattle, Washington
- Party: Republican
- Education: Western Washington University
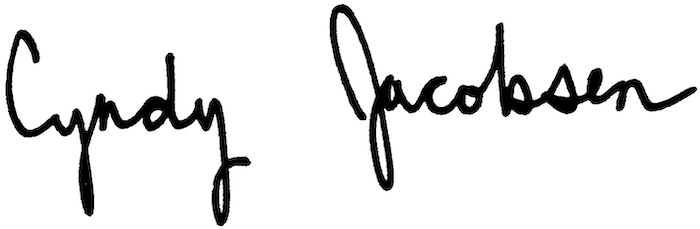
- Signature

Cynthia P. Jacobsen (née Morgan, born June 14, 1960) is an American politician from Washington. In 2020, Jacobsen was elected as a Republican member of Washington House of Representatives for District 25. Jacobsen took office on January 11, 2021.

== Early life and career ==
Cyndy earned bachelor's degrees in accounting and economics from Western Washington University. She also holds a master's in accounting from Central Washington University.

Before her election to the state legislature, Cyndy taught community college mathematics and served on the Puyallup City Council.

== Legislative career ==
During her first term in office, Jacobsen had several bills signed into law. During the 2021 legislative session, Jacobsen was the primary sponsor of House Bill 1119 which requires colleges to notify students of classes with reduced textbook costs or open source textbooks. HB 1119 passed unanimously in both the House and the Senate. It was signed into law by Governor Jay Inslee on May 3, 2021. The following year, Jacobsen proposed several more bills, two of which were signed into law on March 11, 2022, after also passing unanimously in the House and the Senate. HB 1984 protects the privacy of vehicle owners in Washington. Vehicle registration documents printed after January 1, 2023, must be printed in a way which allows the vehicle owner to remove their personal address from the registration without removing other required information. HB 1930 allows estheticians, cosmetologists, hair designers, barbers, manicurists, and their instructors to renew their licenses without paying a penalty fee if their licenses had lapsed between March 1, 2020, and June 30, 2023, during the Washington State COVID-19 emergency declaration. During the 2023 legislative session, Jacobsen helped to secure over 38 million dollars for projects in the 25th district including a 1 million dollar capital grant to enhance the emergency response capabilities at Thun Field Airport in South Hill. During the 2025 legislative session, Jacobsen introduced HB 1038, which would ban gender affirming care for minors in Washington State.

== Personal life ==
Cyndy lives with her husband Doug in Puyallup, WA where they raised their 7 children. Cyndy and Doug have been married for over 40 years and have many grandchildren.

== Puyallup Safety Building ==
In August 2019, a consultant offered the City of Puyallup options for replacing their police building with an updated safety building. The police stated that the current building had a leaky roof and too little space for their needs, forcing them to rent storage units for equipment and office space from a nearby credit union. Although initially hesitant about the price tag and perceived "fancy" design, Jacobsen said on January 14, 2020, that she had been convinced of the value and she was "ready to pull the trigger on this." The building lost the public vote by a margin of 0.7 percent (36.4 percent of registered voters turned in ballots).

At a council meeting on November 23, 2021, Jacobsen voted against bringing the building back to the ballot in February 2022.

== Puyallup racism controversy ==
In 2021, after a "pickaninny" statue was erected in a busy Puyallup neighborhood, some community members called for it to be removed. Acting as Puyallup City Councilmember, Jacobsen said the "racist" statue was protected as free speech. City activists proposed a plan for the city council to form a commission to review racist and discriminatory acts in the city. The council rejected the plan. Jacobsen said, "My personal problems with the plan we were given, graciously, by the people proposing it … was that the commission would have a scope of authority that we would not entitled to give them. If we were to put some more authority into the arts commission or the library board, to perhaps address this. We've talked about festivals, we've talked about book clubs, we're talking about educational events that we could have, we're open."

When asked about the racist statue during a Public Candidate Forum with the League of Women Voters, she said "I don't believe in limits on free speech. I think that that racist statue, although it was terrible, the guy had a right to put it there, and what was nice about what happened with that racist statue is the neighbors got him to take it down and so that's the way I think it should happen." Her opponent pointed out that hate speech is not protected as free speech in some forms. In an article about the statute incident, Attorney James Bible said, "Hate speech, in and of itself is not covered under free speech, under our Constitution and our First Amendment." He went on to say that determining what constitutes hate speech is a complicated issue.
