= Jesse Young (politician) =

American politician from Washington

Member of the Washington House of Representatives from the 26th district
- In office January 17, 2014 – January 9, 2023
- Preceded by: Jan Angel
- Succeeded by: Spencer Hutchins

Personal details
- Born: Jesse Lee Young; 1976 (age 49–50) Boise, Idaho, U.S.
- Party: Republican
- Children: 6
- Education: University of Notre Dame (BS)
- Website: Official website

Jesse Lee Young (born 1976) is an American politician who served as a member of the Washington House of Representatives for the 26th district from 2014 to 2023. He is a member of the Republican Party.

== Early life and education ==
Born in Boise, Idaho, Young was raised in the Hilltop neighborhood of Tacoma, Washington, where he spent some of his childhood homeless. Young eventually graduated from Woodrow Wilson High School and was accepted to the University of Notre Dame. In college, Young competed on the track team as a pole vaulter and worked in the dining hall to pay his tuition. In 1999, Young earned a Bachelor of Science degree in management information systems from the Mendoza College of Business at the University of Notre Dame.

== Career ==
Young began his career as an IT consultant for major corporations before entering state government. Young was appointed to the Washington House of Representatives on January 17, 2014, succeeding Jan Angel following the latter's election to the Washington State Senate. He ran for a seat in the Washington State Senate in 2022, losing to incumbent Democrat Emily Randall.

== Controversies ==
In a letter dated December 13, 2016, Young was informed by an attorney for the Washington House of Representatives that he was being restricted from interacting directly with his legislative assistants and was no longer eligible to have a district office for the period of one year. The letter stated that the actions were taken as a result of "credible and serious" allegations of a "pattern of hostile and intimidating behavior." Legislative aides and other colleagues alleged that this behavior included "screaming fits," "meltdowns," and "crude references to the female anatomy." The letter further stated that the restrictions might be removed if Young were to complete an anger management training program, a management training program, and respectful workplace training.

In October 2017, Young was fined $1,000 by the Washington Legislative Ethics Board for campaigning on state resources and utilizing a legislative state-employed assistant to aid in his election campaigns. Young was fined an additional $500 in June 2018 for again using state resources for his campaign activities.

One of his more controversial bills was to create an Aircraft Carrier Bridge spanning from Port orchard to Bremerton.

In 2020 during a peaceful Black Lives Matter protest in Gig Harbor, Washington, Jesse Young was joined by counter-protestors wearing rifles, other firearms and ammunition.

== Awards ==
- 2014 Guardians of Small Business award. Presented by NFIB.
- 2020 Guardians of Small Business. Presented by NFIB.

== Personal life ==
Young's wife is Jennifer Young. They have six children. Young and his family live in Gig Harbor, Washington.
