= J. T. Wilcox =

American politician (born 1962)

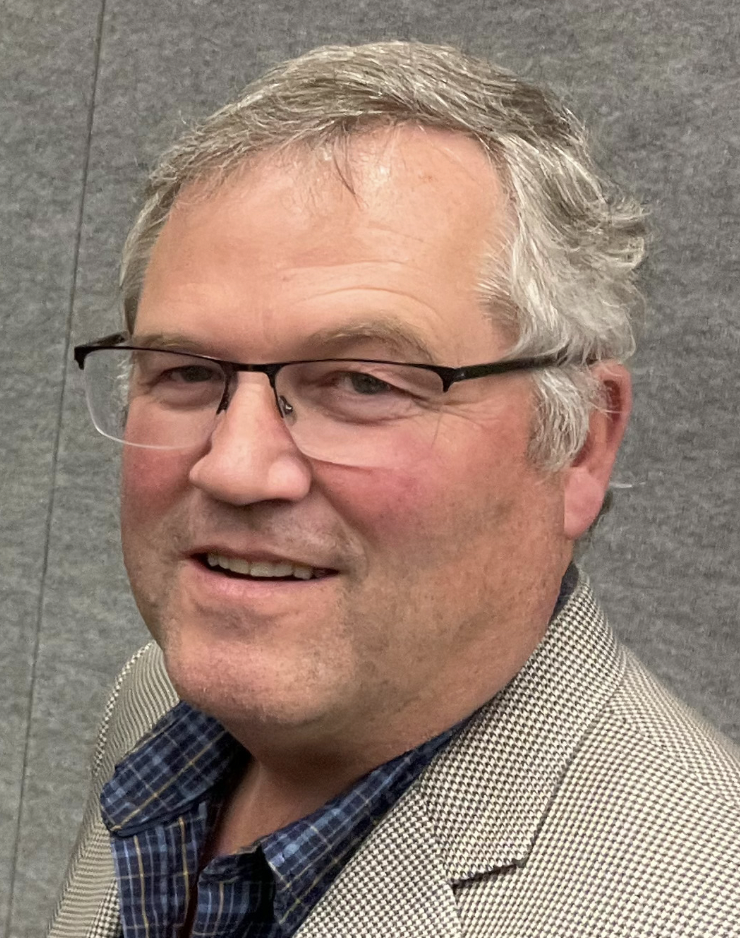
- Wilcox in 2024

Minority Leader of the Washington House of Representatives
- In office March 9, 2018 – April 23, 2023
- Preceded by: Dan Kristiansen
- Succeeded by: Drew Stokesbary

Member of the Washington House of Representatives from the 2nd district
- In office January 10, 2011 – January 13, 2025
- Preceded by: Tom Campbell
- Succeeded by: Matt Marshall

Personal details
- Born: James Truman Wilcox III; October 15, 1962 (age 63) Yelm, Washington, U.S.
- Party: Republican
- Spouse: Kathy Wilcox
- Children: 3
- Education: Washington State University (BA)

James Truman Wilcox III (born October 15, 1962) is an American politician from Washington. Wilcox served as a member of the Washington House of Representatives from 2011 until 2025, representing the 2nd district.

He was Minority Floor Leader for 6 years before being elected Minority Leader by the House Republican Caucus on March 8, 2018, following the retirement of Representative Dan Kristiansen. He resigned his position as Minority Leader at the close of the 2023 legislative session, and was replaced by Drew Stokesbary of Auburn. In February 2024, Wilcox announced he would not seek re-election. Wilcox served on the House Appropriations, Finance, and Rules Committees.

== Awards ==
- 2014 Guardians of Small Business award. Presented by NFIB.
- 2020 Guardians of Small Business. Presented by NFIB.

== Personal life ==
Wilcox's wife is Kathy Wilcox. They have three children. Wilcox and his family live in Roy, Washington.

His family has owned and operated Wilcox Farms in Roy since 1909.

Washington House of Representatives
Preceded by Dan Kristiansen	Minority Leader of the Washington House of Representatives; 2018–2023	Succeeded by Drew Stokesbary
