= Travis Couture =

American politician (born 1988 or 1989)

- Couture in 2026

Member of the Washington House of Representatives from the 35th district
- Incumbent
- Assumed office January 9, 2023 Serving with Dan Griffey
- Preceded by: Drew MacEwen

Personal details
- Born: 1988 or 1989 (age 37–38) Sidney, Montana, U.S.
- Party: Republican
- Spouse: Julie Cromie
- Children: 4
- Education: Brandman University (BA, MBA)
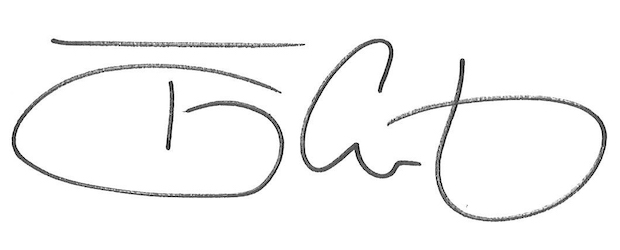
- Signature

Military service
- Branch/service: United States Navy
- Years of service: 2007–2011

Travis Couture (born 1988 or 1989) is an American politician who has served as a Republican member of the Washington House of Representatives from the 35th district since 2023.

== Personal life ==
Couture has four children with Julie Cromie, who is a Democrat.
