= Washington's 22nd legislative district =

American legislative district

Coordinates: 47°4′N 122°51′W

Washington's 22nd legislative district

Washington's 22nd legislative district is one of forty-nine districts in Washington state for representation in the state legislature.

The district includes the state capital Olympia and areas surrounding it, such as Lacey and Tumwater.

The district's legislators are state senator Jessica Bateman and state representatives Beth Doglio (position 1) and Lisa Parshley (position 2), all Democrats.

== See also ==
- Washington Redistricting Commission
- Washington State Legislature
- Washington State Senate
- Washington House of Representatives
