= Lisa Parshley =

American politician and veterinarian

Member of the Washington House of Representatives from the 22nd (Position 2) district
- Incumbent
- Assumed office January 13, 2025
- Preceded by: Jessica Bateman

Personal details
- Born: Lisa Parshley
- Party: Democratic
- Education: Oregon Health & Science University (PhD in Biochemistry); University of Washington (Post-doctoral studies); Doctor of Veterinary Medicine (2003)
- Occupation: Veterinary oncologist, small business owner, city councilmember

Lisa Parshley is an American politician, veterinary oncologist, and small business owner who is a member of the Washington House of Representatives representing the state's 22nd district, Position 2. A member of the Democratic Party, Parshley assumed office on January 13, 2025, succeeding Jessica Bateman, who ran for the Washington State Senate. She previously served as a member of the Olympia City Council, representing Position 5 from 2018 to 2024.

== Education and early career ==
Parshley earned her Ph.D. in biochemistry from Oregon Health & Science University and completed post-doctoral studies at the University of Washington. She became a certified Doctor of Veterinary Medicine in 2003 and achieved board certification as a veterinary oncologist in 2008. She is a small business owner.

== Political career ==
=== Olympia city council ===
Parshley was elected to the Olympia City Council in 2017 and has represented Position 5 since January 1, 2018. She has also served as chair of the Finance Committee, Thurston County Human Rights Commission, and the LOTT (Lacey, Olympia, Tumwater, and Thurston County wastewater corporation) board of directors.

During her tenure on the city council, Parshley worked to extend Olympia's sanctuary city status to include reproductive rights and health care, making it the first city in Washington to do so. She also voted to extend the city's camping ban.

=== Washington House of Representatives ===
==== 2024 election ====
Parshley announced her candidacy for the Washington House of Representatives election in February 2024, running for the open seat left by Jessica Bateman, who ran for the State Senate. In the August 6 primary election, she received 63.0% of the vote, advancing to the general election alongside Syd Locke, a Senior Legislative aide in the legislature.

Parshley focused her campaign on helping the middle class, expanding affordable housing, and extending healthcare protection. She was endorsed by Bateman as well as Olympia Mayor Dontae Payne. In the general election, Parshley defeated Locke by 65.2% to Locke's 34.8%. Although able to serve on the Olympia city council and the House of Representatives at the same time, Parshley chose to resign from the city council to focus her time in the legislature.

==== Tenure ====
In 2025, Parshley introduced legislation to require Washington dairies and feedlots to collect data on cattle methane emissions. The bill was mocked by some media outlets and Republican legislators as an attempt to regulate "cow farts".

The same year, Parshley authored a bill that would have banned the production and sale of foie gras produced by force-feeding. She cited animal cruelty concerns, stating that as a veterinarian, she finds the practice of force-feeding ducks "truly awful" and "horrifying".

Parshley is also a supporter of universal healthcare and debuted The Washington Health Trust, a statewide universal healthcare proposal originally introduced to the public by Whole Washington as a ballot initiative, into the Washington House of Representatives in her first term in the state legislature (2025) as HB.1445. She was appointed to the Washington state Universal Health Care Commission later that summer.
