= Dan Griffey =

American politician

- Griffey in 2026

Member of the Washington House of Representatives from the 35th district
- Incumbent
- Assumed office January 12, 2015 Serving with Travis Couture
- Preceded by: Kathy Haigh

Personal details
- Born: 1970 (age 55–56) Allyn, Washington, U.S.
- Party: Republican
- Spouse: Dinah Griffey
- Occupation: Firefighter
- Website: Campaign website Legislative website

Daniel G. Griffey (born 1970) is an American firefighter and politician from Washington. Griffey is a Republican member of Washington House of Representatives. In 2014, Griffey defeated Democratic incumbent Kathy Haigh to pick up one of four House seats gained by Washington Republicans that year.

== Career ==
At age 16, Griffey became a volunteer firefighter. In 1992, Griffey became a firefighter for Central Mason Fire Department in Mason County. Griffey became a lieutenant.

Griffey is the ranking minority member on the House Local Government Committee and also sits on the Early Learning and Human Services and Public Safety Committees. Representative Griffey was selected by House Republican leadership to serve as Assistant Whip.

Griffey has been a leading proponent to eliminate the statute of limitations for rape.

== Personal life ==
Griffey's wife is Dinah Griffey. They have three children. Griffey and his family live in Allyn, Washington.
