= Dave Paul =

American politician from Washington

Member of the Washington House of Representatives from the 10th district
- Incumbent
- Assumed office January 14, 2019 Serving with Clyde Shavers
- Preceded by: Dave Hayes

Personal details
- Born: 1968 (age 57–58) Enumclaw, Washington, U.S.
- Party: Democratic
- Education: Seattle University (BA); Miami University (MA); University of Illinois at Urbana-Champaign (PhD)

David M. Paul (born 1968) is a Democratic member of the Washington House of Representatives.

Paul, who worked at Skagit Valley College for a decade, was first elected to the state legislature in 2018, running against Republican incumbent Dave Hayes. Before joining the House of Representatives, Paul served on the Oak Harbor Educational Foundation's Board of Directors as well as serving as the vice-president of Institutional Planning and Effectiveness at Skagit Valley College.

Paul represents the 10th Legislative District, which includes Island County as well as parts of both Skagit County and Snohomish County.

== Notable legislation ==
Paul voted in favor of HB 1589, which is described as supporting Washington's clean energy economy and transitioning to a clean, affordable, and reliable energy future by prohibiting the expansion of natural gas services and other regulations on natural gas companies.
