= Clyde Shavers =

American politician

Member of the Washington House of Representatives from the 10th district
- Incumbent
- Assumed office January 9, 2023 Serving with Dave Paul
- Preceded by: Greg Gilday

Personal details
- Party: Democratic
- Education: United States Naval Academy; Yale University
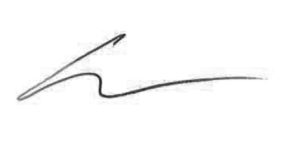
- Signature

Military service
- Branch/service: United States Navy

Clyde Shavers is an American politician serving as a Democratic member of the Washington House of Representatives from the 10th district since 2023.

== Career ==
Clyde Shavers serves as the state representative for Washington's 10th legislative district. He is the Vice Chair of the House Education Committee and a member of the Capital Budget Committee, Innovation, Community & Economic Development Committee, and Veterans Committee. Shavers also serves on the Artificial Intelligence Task Force.

During his first term, Shavers sponsored seven bills and co-sponsored thirty-two bills. Notable legislative achievements include passing a fusion technology bill, developing an Allied Health Professions Career and Technical Education (CTE) program in schools, and establishing the Purple Star Award for military families.

Shavers was elected by a margin of 211 votes.

== Controversies ==
In late October 2022, a little over a week before election day, Clyde Shavers' father, Brett Shavers, released a statement about ongoing allegations of dishonesty involving his son's military career and other claims made by the Shavers campaign. In the statement, Brett Shavers admonished his son for lying about being a nuclear submarine captain during his naval career. Clyde Shavers was an officer in the U.S. Navy and attended the Navy Nuclear Power School in the early 2010s; however, records show that at no point was he ever promoted to a Nuclear Submarine Captain. According to the Everett Herald, Clyde was an officer on a nuclear submarine where he performed clerical duties. The Everett Herald did not report that Clyde purported to be a captain.

In addition, Brett Shavers also accused his son of lying about being raised on a farm, a lack of genuine connection to the legislative district where he was running for office, and his son's claim of having been a practicing lawyer despite not having passed the bar exam needed to become one. In reality, Clyde did not claim to be a practicing lawyer. According to King 5 News: "A Clyde Shavers spokesperson said the candidate never represented himself as a working attorney. The spokesperson said when Clyde Shavers was registering with the Public Disclosure Commission as a candidate, he tried entering “lawyer” on the digital form, but only “attorney-lawyer” came up as an option. That spokesperson said a lawyer is someone who graduated law school and an attorney is someone who passed the bar exam." Clyde immediately rectified the confusion on his website. His current website states: "He is a graduate of the U.S. Naval Academy. Following his service, Rep. Shavers graduated from Yale Law School, where he established the student group Yale Coalition to End Homelessness and studied environmental law with the Natural Resources Defense Council." Lending credibility to the allegations, a local newspaper, the Everett Herald, rescinded a previous endorsement given to Shavers for his political campaign.
