= Jessica Bateman =

American politician (born 1981)

Member of the Washington State Senate from the 22nd district
- Incumbent
- Assumed office January 13, 2025
- Preceded by: Sam Hunt

Member of the Washington House of Representatives from the 22nd district
- In office January 11, 2021 – January 13, 2025
- Preceded by: Beth Doglio
- Succeeded by: Lisa Parshley

Personal details
- Born: Jessica Danielle Bateman; 1981 (age 44–45) Kent, Washington, U.S.
- Party: Democratic
- Education: Green River College (AA); Evergreen State College (BA, MPP)
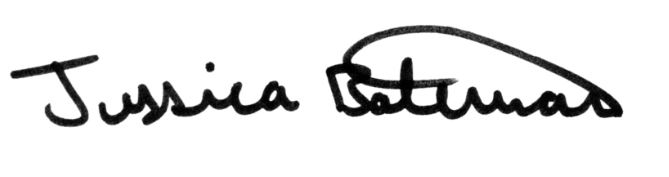
- Signature

Jessica Danielle Bateman (born 1981) is an American politician who is currently serving as a member of the Washington State Senate for the 22nd district. She previously served as the Representative for District 22 in the Washington House of Representatives. Elected in 2020, she assumed office on January 11, 2021, succeeding Beth Doglio. During her tenure, she has authored legislation to increase housing construction in Washington.

== Early life and education ==
Raised by a single mother, Bateman earned an associate degree from Green River College and moved to Olympia, Washington to attend Evergreen State College. She earned a Bachelor of Arts degree in environmental studies and Master of Public Policy.

== Career ==
From 2012 to 2015, she worked as a legislative assistant in the Washington House of Representatives. In 2015, she was elected to the Olympia, Washington City Council and later served as Mayor Pro Tem of Olympia. After Beth Doglio announced that she would not seek re-election to the State House and instead run for Washington's 10th congressional district, Bateman announced her candidacy to succeed her. Bateman placed second in the nonpartisan blanket primary and defeated her Republican opponent, Dusty Pierpoint, in the November election. She assumed office on January 11, 2021.

During her tenure in the Washington House, she has authored legislation to increase housing construction in Washington. In 2024, Bateman criticized Seattle's housing plan for not facilitating enough housing.
