= Mary Fosse =

American politician

Member of the Washington House of Representatives from the 38th district
- Incumbent
- Assumed office January 9, 2023 Serving with Julio Cortes
- Preceded by: Mike Sells

Member of the Everett City Council from the 1st district
- Incumbent
- Assumed office January 3, 2022
- Preceded by: Position created

Personal details
- Party: Democratic
- Children: 2
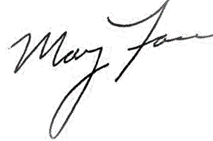
- Signature
- Website: Campaign website

Mary Fosse is an American politician who has served as a Democratic member of the Washington House of Representatives from the 38th district since 2023. She has also been a member of the Everett City Council since 2022 as a representative from the 1st district.
