= Julio Cortes (politician) =

American politician

Member of the Washington House of Representatives from the 38th district
- Incumbent
- Assumed office January 9, 2023 Serving with Mary Fosse
- Preceded by: Emily Wicks

Personal details
- Born: Mexico
- Party: Democratic
- Education: Western Washington University (BA)
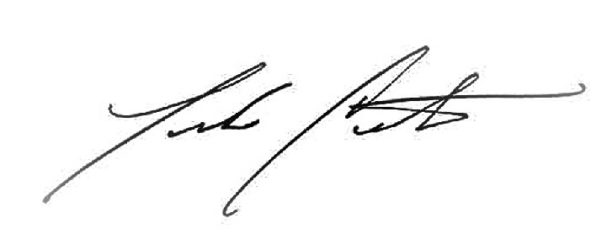
- Signature

Julio Cortes is an American politician serving as a member of the Washington House of Representatives for the 38th district. Elected in November 2022, he assumed office on January 9, 2023.

== Education ==
Cortes earned a Bachelor of Arts degree in public relations and journalism from Western Washington University in 2009.

== Career ==
From 2010 to 2018, Cortes worked as an outreach and public relations manager at Cocoon House, a non-profit organization. From 2018 to 2021, he served as a communications officer for the city of Everett, Washington. Cortes was elected to the Washington House of Representatives in November 2022.

== Personal life ==
Cortes grew up in Wapato, Washington, after he and his family immigrated from Mexico to work in agriculture.
