= Spencer Hutchins =

American businessman and politician

Member of the Washington House of Representatives from the 26th district
- In office January 9, 2023 – January 13, 2025
- Preceded by: Jesse Young
- Succeeded by: Adison Richards

Personal details
- Party: Republican
- Education: Gonzaga University (BA); University of Washington (JD)
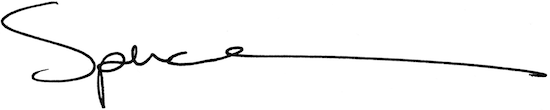
- Signature

Spencer W. Hutchins is an American businessman and politician who served as a member of the Washington House of Representatives for the 26th district. Elected in November 2022, he assumed office on January 9, 2023.

== Early life and education ==
A native of Gig Harbor, Washington, Hutchins graduated from Gig Harbor High School. He earned a Bachelor of Arts degree from Gonzaga University and a Juris Doctor from the University of Washington School of Law.

== Career ==
Prior to entering law school, Hutchins worked as a staffer for members of the United States House of Representatives and Washington House of Representatives. He is the co-owner and managing broker of Keller Williams West Sound Realty. Hutchins was elected to the Washington House of Representatives in November 2022. In February 2024, Hutchins announced he would not run for a second term in the House of Representatives.
