= Mike Steele (Washington politician) =

American politician from Washington

Member of the Washington House of Representatives from the 12th district
- Incumbent
- Assumed office January 9, 2017 Serving with Brian Burnett
- Preceded by: Brad Hawkins

Personal details
- Born: 1982 (age 43–44) Chelan, Washington, U.S.
- Party: Republican
- Education: Pacific Lutheran University (BA)
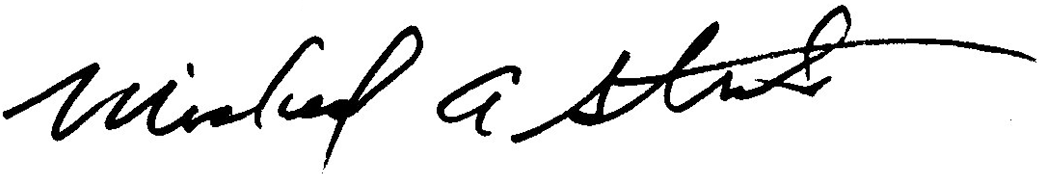
- Signature
- Website: Official

Michael A. Steele (born 1982) is an American politician of the Republican Party. He is a member of the Washington House of Representatives, representing the 12th Legislative District since first being elected in 2017. He previously served on the White House staff during the George W. Bush administration as a member of the Political Affairs Team.

== Early life and career ==
Steele was born and raised in Chelan, Washington. After graduating from Pacific Lutheran University, he served on the White House staff as a member of the Political Affairs Team during the George W. Bush administration and as a staff member for the Washington House of Representatives Republican Caucus. He is the executive director of the Lake Chelan Chamber of Commerce.

== Political career ==
Steele served on the Chelan, Washington city council from 2012 to 2016. He ran for the state legislature following the announcement that Brad Hawkins would run for the State Senate. Steele won in 2016 with 60% of the vote over Republican Jerry Paine.

== Awards ==
- 2020 Guardians of Small Business. Presented by NFIB.
