= Kelly Chambers (politician) =

American politician from Washington

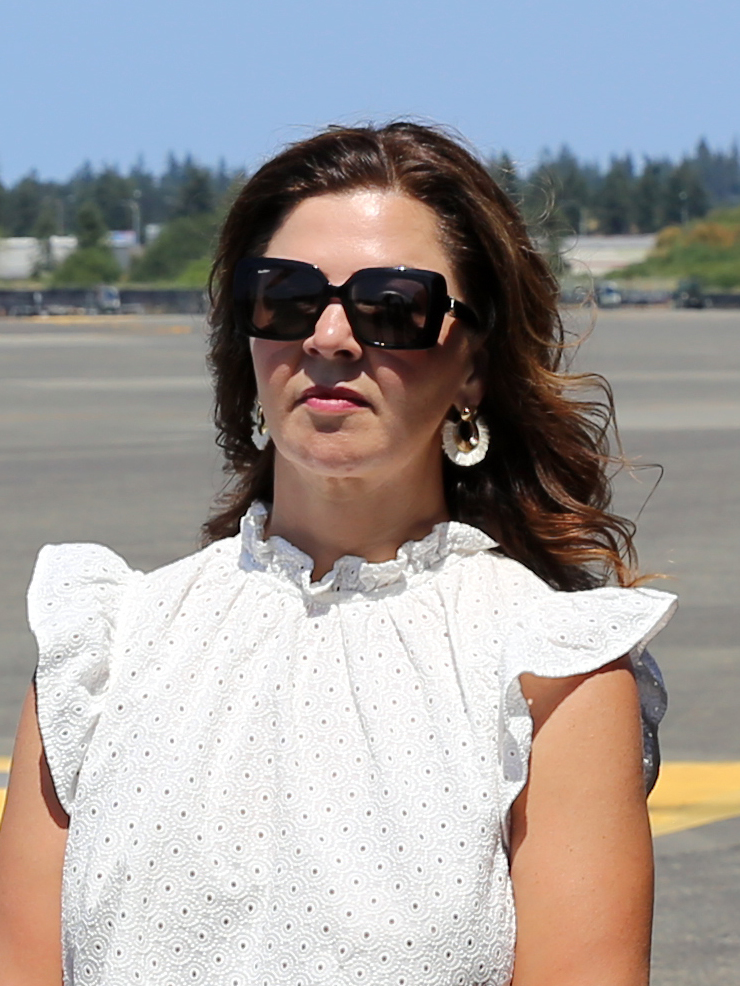

Member of the Washington House of Representatives from the 25th district
- In office January 14, 2019 – January 13, 2025
- Preceded by: Melanie Stambaugh
- Succeeded by: Michael Keaton

Personal details
- Born: Kelly M. Smith; 1975 or 1976 (age 49–50) Washington, U.S.
- Party: Republican
- Education: Pacific Lutheran University (BA)
- Profession: Businesswoman
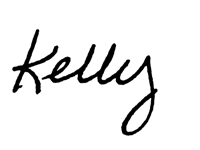
- Signature
- Website: Legislative website

Kelly M. Chambers (née Smith, born 1975 or 1976) is an American businesswoman and politician.

== Education ==
Chambers graduated from Pacific Lutheran University.

== Career ==
As a business woman, Chambers is the co-owner of the local franchise for in-home senior aide provider Visiting Angels.

Chambers is a state representative in the Washington State legislature, representing the 25th Legislative District. She was first elected in 2018, defeating Jamie Smith by more than 1,100 votes.

== Personal life ==
Chambers, a graduate of Pacific Lutheran University, is married to Jeff Chambers. They have three children: Ashton, Savanna, and Nick.
