= Washington's 25th legislative district =

American legislative district

Map of Washington's 25th legislative district

Washington's 25th legislative district is one of forty-nine districts in Washington state for representation in the state legislature.

The district includes Puyallup and the surrounding area in Pierce County.

The district's legislators are state senator Chris Gildon and state representatives Michael Keaton (position 1) and Cyndy Jacobsen (position 2), all Republicans.

== See also ==
- Washington Redistricting Commission
- Washington State Legislature
- Washington State Senate
- Washington House of Representatives
