= Washington's 35th legislative district =

American legislative district

Coordinates: 47°16′N 123°7′W

Map of Washington's 35th legislative district

Washington's 35th legislative district is one of forty-nine districts in Washington state for representation in the state legislature.

It covers all of Mason County, and parts of Thurston and Kitsap counties.

The district's legislators are state senator Drew MacEwen (R) and state representatives Dan Griffey (R; position 1) and Travis Couture (R; position 2). The previous Senator, Tim Sheldon stated in March 2022 that he did not intend to run for reelection in the next cycle. MacEwen, who previously served as Representative in Position 2, ran for and was elected in November 2022 to replace Sheldon in the Senate.

== See also ==
- Washington Redistricting Commission
- Washington State Legislature
- Washington State Senate
- Washington House of Representatives
