= Washington's 27th legislative district =

American legislative district

Map of Washington's 27th legislative district

Washington's 27th legislative district is one of forty-nine districts in Washington state for representation in the state legislature.

The district includes most of northern Tacoma.

The district's legislators are state senator Yasmin Trudeau and state representatives Laurie Jinkins (position 1) and Jake Fey (position 2), all Democrats. Jinkins is the current Speaker of the House.

== See also ==
- Washington Redistricting Commission
- Washington State Legislature
- Washington State Senate
- Washington House of Representatives
