= Washington's 7th legislative district =

American legislative district

Coordinates: 48°N 118°W

Washington state, 7th legislative district map

Washington's 7th legislative district is one of 49 districts in Washington for representation in the state legislature. The district is in the extreme northeast of the state and borders Canada's British Columbia on the north and Idaho on the east. It includes all of Ferry, Okanogan, Pend Orielle, and Stevens counties, along with portions of Chelan, Douglas and Spokane counties. An earlier redistricting proposal from 2021 would have divided Okanogan County between the 7th and 13th districts. The district was most recently redrawn by court order in the 2024 case Soto Palmer v. Hobbs.

The largely rural district is represented by Shelly Short in the state senate and state representatives Andrew Engell (R-pos. 1) and Hunter Abell (R-pos. 2).

== Recent election results ==
=== State senator ===
2006 general election
Party	Candidate	Votes	%
Republican	Bob Morton (inc.)	31,243	68.0%
Democratic	Chris Zaferes	14,439	32.0%

2010 general election
Party	Candidate	Votes	%
Republican	Bob Morton (inc.)	37,649	74.86%
Democratic	Barbara Mowrey	13,359	26.17%

2013 special election
Party	Candidate	Votes	%
Republican	Brian Dansel	18,873	53.63%
Republican	John Smith (inc.)	16,324	46.37%

2014 general election
Party	Candidate	Votes	%
Republican	Brian Dansel (inc.)	32,702	72.17%
Republican	Tony Booth	12,612	27.83%

2017 special election
Party	Candidate	Votes	%
Republican	Shelly Short (inc.)	25,444	68.29%
Democratic	Karen Hardy	11,814	31.71%

2018 general election
Party	Candidate	Votes	%
Republican	Shelly Short (inc.)	48,042	69.01%
Democratic	Karen Hardy	21,592	30.99%

== Past legislators ==
=== Statehood-1932 ===
During this period, the state senate and state house districts were geographically distinct.

Year	Senate		House		
Year	Senator	Senate District Geography	House Position 1	House Position 2	House District Geography
1st (1889-1890)	H. H. Wolfe (R)	Columbia County			
2nd (1891-1892)	Thomas J. Smith (R)	Whitman County (part)	House District Established		Whitman County (part)
2nd (1891-1892)	Thomas J. Smith (R)	Whitman County (part)	Joseph Arrasmith (R) (Note: Elected Speaker of the House for the 3rd legislative session (1893-94)	O. E. Young (R)	Whitman County (part)
3rd (1893-1894)	Thomas J. Smith (R)	Whitman County (part)	Joseph Arrasmith (R)	E. H. Letterman (R)	Whitman County (part)
4th (1895-1896)	Oliver Hall (R)	Whitman County (part)	Moses Bull (R)	W. S. Johnston (R)	Whitman County (part)
5th (1897-1898)	Oliver Hall (R)	Whitman County (part)	John L. Canutt (Pop.)	Miles T. Hooper (Pop.)	Whitman County (part)
6th (1899-1900)	Oliver Hall (R)	Whitman County (part)	William L. La Follette (R)	Wilford Allen (R)	Whitman County (part)
7th (1901-1902)	Oliver Hall (R)	Whitman County (part)	G. W. Barkhuff (D)	E. J. Durham (R)	Whitman County (part)
8th (1903-1904)	Huber Rasher (D)	Spokane County (part)	E. J. Durham (R)	Charles L. Mackenzie (D)	Whitman County (part)
9th (1905-1906)	Huber Rasher (D)	Spokane County (part)	Peter McGregor (R)	LeRoy Stilson (R)	Whitman County (part)
10th (1907-1908)	Harry Rosenhaupt (R)	Spokane County (part)	J. Hugh Sherfey (R)	Mark W. Whitlow (D)	Whitman County (part)
11th (1909-1910)	Harry Rosenhaupt (R)	Spokane County (part)	O. E. Young (R)	Hugh C. Todd (D)	Whitman County (part)
12th (1911-1912)	Harry Rosenhaupt (R)	Spokane County (part)	Charles R. Larue (D)	Hugh C. Todd (D)	Whitman County (part)
13th (1913-1914)	Harry Rosenhaupt (R)	Spokane County (part)	George H. Newman (R)	Charles L. Chamberlin (R)	Whitman County (part)
14th (1915-1916)	Frank A. Chase (R)	Spokane County (part)	James H. T. Smith (R)	George H. Watt (R)	Whitman County (part)
15th (1917-1918)	Frank A. Chase (R)	Spokane County (part)	C. E. Hoover (R)	Roy Jones (R)	Whitman County (part)
16th (1919-1920)	Edwin T. Coman (R)	Spokane County (part)	Frank E. Sanger (R)	Roy Jones (R)	Whitman County (part)
17th (1921-1922)	Edwin T. Coman (R)	Spokane County (part)	Roy Jones (R)	Frank E. Sanger (R)	Whitman County (part)
18th (1923-1924)	Reba Hurn (R)	Spokane County (part)	A. E. Olson (R)	John M. Klemgard (D)	Whitman County (part)
19th (1925-1926)	Reba Hurn (R)	Spokane County (part)	A. E. Olson (R)	Roy Jones (R)	Whitman County (part)
20th (1927-1928)	Reba Hurn (R)	Spokane County (part)	A. E. Olson (R)	Roy Jones (R)	Whitman County (part)
21st (1929-1930)	Reba Hurn (R)	Spokane County (part)	A. E. Olson (R)	Roy Jones (R)	Whitman County (part)
22nd (1931-1932)	Charles H. Voss (R)	Spokane County (part)	A. E. Olson (R)	Roy Jones (R)	Whitman County (part)

=== 1933-Present ===
After the passage of Initiative 57 and the 1930 redistricting cycle, the state senate and state house districts were geographically similar. While some senate districts would occasionally be broken up into house seats A and B, seats A and B were always contained in the Senate district boundaries.

The 7th Legislative district's state senate and house seats are identical geographically from 1933 to the present day.

Year	Senate	House		District Geography
Year	Senator	House Position 1	House Position 2	District Geography
23rd (1933-1934)	Charles H. Voss (R)	Frank Anderson (D)	Dave Cohn (D)	Spokane County (part)
24th (1935-1936)	Joseph Drumheller (D)	David C. Cowen (D)	Edward J. Reilly (D) (Note: Elected Speaker of the House for the 25th, 27th, & 28th legislative sessions (1937-38, 41-44))	Spokane County (part)
25th (1937-1938)	Joseph Drumheller (D)	David C. Cowen (D)	Edward J. Reilly (D)	Spokane County (part)
26th (1939-1940)	Joseph Drumheller (D)	David C. Cowen (D)	Edward J. Reilly (D)	Spokane County (part)
27th (1941-1942)	Joseph Drumheller (D)	David C. Cowen (D)	Edward J. Reilly (D)	Spokane County (part)
28th (1943-1944)	David C. Cowen (D)	P. J. Oldershaw (R)	Edward J. Reilly (D)	Spokane County (part)
29th (1945-1946)	David C. Cowen (D)	Edward T. Chambers (D)	William H. Price Jr. (D)	Spokane County (part)
30th (1947-1948)	David C. Cowen (D)	Howard T. Ball (R)	Harry W. Pierong (R)	Spokane County (part)
31st (1949-1950)	David C. Cowen (D)	Howard T. Ball (R)	James P. Dillard (D)	Spokane County (part)
32nd (1951-1952)	David C. Cowen (D)	Howard T. Ball (R)	C. A. Orndorff (R)	Spokane County (part)
33rd (1953-1954)	David C. Cowen (D)	Howard T. Ball (R)	Edward J. Reilly (D)	Spokane County (part)
34th (1955-1956)	David C. Cowen (D)	Howard T. Ball (R)	Edward F. Harris (R)	Spokane County (part)
35th (1957-1958)	David C. Cowen (D)	Edward F. Harris (R)	Richard W. Morphis (R)	Spokane County (part)
36th (1959-1960)	David C. Cowen (D)	Edward F. Harris (R)	Richard W. Morphis (R)	Spokane County (part)
37th (1961-1962)	David C. Cowen (D)	Edward F. Harris (R)	Richard W. Morphis (R)	Spokane County (part)
38th (1963-1964)	David C. Cowen (D)	Edward F. Harris (R)	Richard W. Morphis (R)	Spokane County (part)
39th (1965-1966)	David C. Cowen (D)	Edward F. Harris (R)	Richard W. Morphis (R)	Spokane County (part)
40th (1967-1968)	Robert W. Twigg (R)	Carlton A. Gladder (R)	Edward F. Harris (R)	1965 Redistricting
40th (1967-1968)	Robert W. Twigg (R)	Carlton A. Gladder (R)	Edward F. Harris (R)	Spokane County (part)
41st (1969-1970)	Robert W. Twigg (R)	Carlton A. Gladder (R)	Edward F. Harris (R)	Spokane County (part)
42nd (1971-1972)	Robert W. Twigg (R)	Carlton A. Gladder (R)	Edward F. Harris (R)	Spokane County (part)
43rd (1973-1974)	Robert W. Twigg (R)	Joe Haussler (D)	Bill Schumaker (R)	1972 Redistricting
43rd (1973-1974)	Robert W. Twigg (R)	Joe Haussler (D)	Bill Schumaker (R)	Ferry, Lincoln, Pend Oreille, Stevens, Okanogan (part), and Spokane (part)
44th (1975-1976)	Bruce A. Wilson (D)	Joe Haussler (D)	Bill Schumaker (R)	Ferry, Lincoln, Pend Oreille, Stevens, Okanogan (part), and Spokane (part)
45th (1977-1978)	Bruce A. Wilson (D)	Helen Fancher (R)	Scott Barr (R)	Ferry, Lincoln, Pend Oreille, Stevens, Okanogan (part), and Spokane (part)
46th (1979-1980)	Bruce A. Wilson (D)	Helen Fancher (R)	Scott Barr (R)	Ferry, Lincoln, Pend Oreille, Stevens, Okanogan (part), and Spokane (part)
47th (1981-1982)	Bruce A. Wilson (D)	Helen Fancher (R)	Scott Barr (R)	Ferry, Lincoln, Pend Oreille, Stevens, Okanogan (part), and Spokane (part)
48th (1983-1984)	Scott Barr (R) (Note: Resigned Dec. 16, 1993)	Steve Fuhrman (R)	Louis M. Egger (D)	Ferry, Lincoln, Pend Oreille, Stevens, Okanogan (part), and Spokane (part)
49th (1985-1986)	Scott Barr (R)	Steve Fuhrman (R)	Tom Bristow (D) (Note: Resigned Dec. 1, 1989)	Ferry, Lincoln, Pend Oreille, Stevens, Okanogan (part), and Spokane (part)
50th (1987-1988)	Scott Barr (R)	Steve Fuhrman (R)	Tom Bristow (D)	Ferry, Lincoln, Pend Oreille, Stevens, Okanogan (part), and Spokane (part)
51st (1989-1990)	Scott Barr (R)	Steve Fuhrman (R)	Tom Bristow (D)	Ferry, Lincoln, Pend Oreille, Stevens, Okanogan (part), and Spokane (part)
51st (1989-1990)	Scott Barr (R)	Steve Fuhrman (R)	Neal Kirby (D) (Note: Appointed Dec. 29, 1989)	Ferry, Lincoln, Pend Oreille, Stevens, Okanogan (part), and Spokane (part)
51st (1989-1990)	Scott Barr (R)	Steve Fuhrman (R)	Bob Morton (R) (Note: Elected Nov. 6, 1990 to serve unexpired term) (Note: Resigned house seat; Appointed Jan. 5, 1994 to the serve unexpired term in the state senate)	Ferry, Lincoln, Pend Oreille, Stevens, Okanogan (part), and Spokane (part)
52nd (1991-1992)	Scott Barr (R)	Steve Fuhrman (R)	Bob Morton (R)	Ferry, Lincoln, Pend Oreille, Stevens, Okanogan (part), and Spokane (part)
53rd (1993-1994)	Scott Barr (R)	Steve Fuhrman (R)	Bob Morton (R)	Ferry, Lincoln, Pend Oreille, Stevens, Okanogan (part), and Spokane (part)
53rd (1993-1994)	Bob Morton (R) (Note: Resigned Dec. 31, 2012)	Steve Fuhrman (R)	Cathy McMorris (R)	Ferry, Lincoln, Pend Oreille, Stevens, Okanogan (part), and Spokane (part)
54th (1995-1996)	Bob Morton (R)	Steve Fuhrman (R)	Cathy McMorris (R)	Ferry, Lincoln, Pend Oreille, Stevens, Okanogan (part), and Spokane (part)
55th (1997-1998)	Bob Morton (R)	Bob Sump (R)	Cathy McMorris (R)	Ferry, Lincoln, Pend Oreille, Stevens, Okanogan (part), and Spokane (part)
56th (1999-2000)	Bob Morton (R)	Bob Sump (R)	Cathy McMorris (R)	Ferry, Lincoln, Pend Oreille, Stevens, Okanogan (part), and Spokane (part)
57th (2001-2002)	Bob Morton (R)	Bob Sump (R)	Cathy McMorris (R)	Ferry, Lincoln, Pend Oreille, Stevens, Okanogan (part), and Spokane (part)
58th (2003-2004)	Bob Morton (R)	Bob Sump (R)	Cathy McMorris (R)	Ferry, Lincoln, Pend Oreille, Stevens, Okanogan (part), and Spokane (part)
59th (2005-2006)	Bob Morton (R)	Bob Sump (R)	Joel Kretz (R)	Ferry, Lincoln, Pend Oreille, Stevens, Okanogan (part), and Spokane (part)
60th (2007-2008)	Bob Morton (R)	Bob Sump (R)	Joel Kretz (R)	Ferry, Lincoln, Pend Oreille, Stevens, Okanogan (part), and Spokane (part)
61st (2009-2010)	Bob Morton (R)	Shelly Short (R) (Note: Resigned house seat; Appointed Jan. 30; Sworn in Feb. 1; Elected Nov. 8, 2017 to serve unexpired term in the state senate)	Joel Kretz (R)	Ferry, Lincoln, Pend Oreille, Stevens, Okanogan (part), and Spokane (part)
62nd (2011-2012)	Bob Morton (R)	Shelly Short (R)	Joel Kretz (R)	Ferry, Lincoln, Pend Oreille, Stevens, Okanogan (part), and Spokane (part)
63rd (2013-2014)	John Smith (R) (Note: Appointed Jan. 3; Sworn in Jan. 14, 2013)	Shelly Short (R)	Joel Kretz (R)	Ferry, Pend Oreille, Stevens, Okanogan (part), and Spokane (part)
63rd (2013-2014)	Brian Dansel (R) (Note: Elected Nov. 5, 2013; Sworn in Dec. 6, 2013 to serve unexpired term) (Note: Resigned Jan. 24, 2017)	Shelly Short (R)	Joel Kretz (R)	Ferry, Pend Oreille, Stevens, Okanogan (part), and Spokane (part)
64th (2015-2016)	Brian Dansel (R)	Shelly Short (R)	Joel Kretz (R)	Ferry, Pend Oreille, Stevens, Okanogan (part), and Spokane (part)
65th (2017-2018)	Brian Dansel (R)	Shelly Short (R)	Joel Kretz (R)	Ferry, Pend Oreille, Stevens, Okanogan (part), and Spokane (part)
65th (2017-2018)	Shelly Short (R)	Jacquelin Maycumber (R) (Note: Appointed Feb. 1, 2017; Elected Nov. 8, 2017 to serve unexpired term))	Joel Kretz (R)	Ferry, Pend Oreille, Stevens, Okanogan (part), and Spokane (part)
66th (2019-2020)	Shelly Short (R)	Jacquelin Maycumber (R)	Joel Kretz (R)	Ferry, Pend Oreille, Stevens, Okanogan (part), and Spokane (part)
67th (2021-2022)	Shelly Short (R)	Jacquelin Maycumber (R)	Joel Kretz (R)	Ferry, Pend Oreille, Stevens, Okanogan (part), and Spokane (part)
68th (2023-2024)	Shelly Short (R)	Jacquelin Maycumber (R)	Joel Kretz (R)	Ferry, Okanogan, Pend Oreille, Stevens, Douglas (part), Grant (part), and Spokane (part)
69th (2025-2026)	Shelly Short (R)	Andrew Engell (R)	Hunter Abell (R)	Ferry, Okanogan, Pend Oreille, Stevens, Chelan (part), Douglas (part), and Spokane (part) (Note: 2024 court ordered redistricting in Soto Palmer v. Hobbs)

== Key ==
Democratic (D)
Populist (Pop)
Republican (R)

== See also ==
- Washington Redistricting Commission
- Washington State Legislature
- Washington State Senate
- Washington House of Representatives
- Washington (state) legislative districts
