= Fansher =

Surname list

Fansher is a surname. Notable people with the surname include:

- Burt Wendell Fansher (1880–1941), Canadian politician, brother of William
- William Russell Fansher (1876–1957), Canadian politician

== See also ==
- Fancher
- Fansler
