= Vandana Slatter =

Canadian-born American politician from Washington

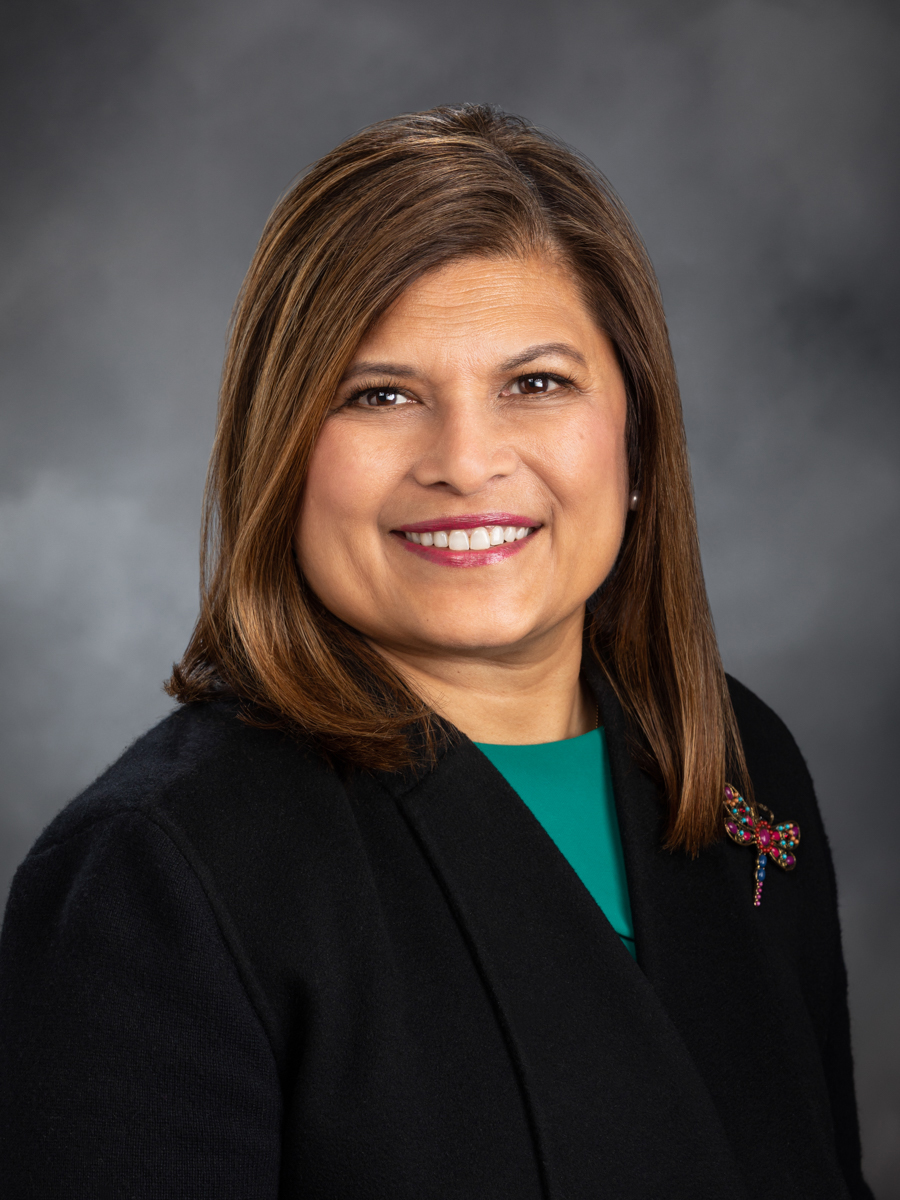

Member of the Washington State Senate from the 48th district
- Incumbent
- Assumed office January 7, 2025
- Preceded by: Patty Kuderer

Member of the Washington House of Representatives from the 48th district
- In office January 5, 2017 – January 7, 2025
- Preceded by: Patty Kuderer
- Succeeded by: Osman Salahuddin

Member of the Bellevue City Council
- In office January 1, 2016 – January 14, 2017
- Preceded by: Claudia Balducci
- Succeeded by: Ernie Simas

Personal details
- Born: 1964 (age 61–62) Vanderhoof, British Columbia, Canada
- Party: Democratic
- Children: 1
- Education: University of British Columbia (BS); University of Washington (DPharm, MPA)

Vandana Slatter (born 1964) is a Canadian-American politician, pharmacist, and scientist serving as a member of the Washington State Senate from the 48th district.

== Early life and education ==
Slatter was born in Vanderhoof, British Columbia, the daughter of Indian immigrants. Her father is a doctor. Slatter earned a Bachelor of Science degree in pharmacy from the University of British Columbia, Doctor of Pharmacy from the University of Washington, and Master of Public Administration from the Evans School of Public Policy and Governance. While studying for her master's degree, Slatter worked in the office of U.S. Senator Maria Cantwell.

== Career ==
Slatter worked as a clinical pharmacist for Amgen before running for office. Slatter ran for Claudia Balducci's seat on the Bellevue city council after Balducci chose to run for King County Council. Slatter won her election and served until January 2017. Ernie Simas was appointed to her seat, but didn't run for election which Janice Zahn won in November 2017.

After Patty Kuderer was chosen to succeed Cyrus Habib, who had been elected Lieutenant Governor of Washington, in the Washington Senate, Slatter was appointed to succeed Kuderer in the Washington House and retained her seat in the 2017 special election.

Slatter was appointed to the Washington Senate on January 7, 2025, to fill the seat vacated by Kuderer following her election as Insurance Commissioner. In the 2025 special election to retain her seat in the Senate, fellow Democrat and representative for the 48th district Amy Walen challenged Slatter for the seat. Walen out spent Slatter and received more outside spending on her behalf, but Slatter retained her seat winning 58% of the vote.

== Personal life ==
Slatter and her husband, Greg, have one son. After earning her bachelor's degree, Slatter and her husband moved to Michigan. Slatter became a U.S. citizen in 2001.
