= Drumheller (disambiguation) =

Drumheller is a town in the Red Deer River valley in the badlands of east-central Alberta, Canada.

Drumheller may also refer to:

== Places ==
=== Canada ===
- Drumheller (provincial electoral district), Alberta
- Drumheller coalfield, Alberta
- Drumheller Institution, a medium-security prison in Drumheller, Alberta
- Drumheller Municipal Airport, an airport northwest of Drumheller, Alberta
- Drumheller/Ostergard's Airport, an airport south southeast of Drumheller, Alberta
- Drumheller-Stettler, a provincial electoral district (riding) in Alberta

=== United States ===
- Drumheller Channels National Natural Landmark in the Channeled Scablands of Washington

== People ==
- Grant Drumheller (fl. 1976–2008), American portrait, figurative and still life painter
- Joseph Drumheller (1900–1970), American businessman and politician
- Robert Drumheller (died 1998), American set decorator
- Thomas Jesse Drumheller (1873–1954), American football player, lawyer and sheep rancher
- Tyler Drumheller (1952–2015), Central Intelligence Agency (CIA) officer
- Walter Drumheller (1878–1958), American track and field athlete and Olympian

== Others ==
- Drumheller Fountain, an outdoor fountain on the University of Washington campus, Seattle, Washington
- HMCS Drumheller, a Flower-class corvette that served with the Royal Canadian Navy during the Second World War
