= Bob Morton (politician) =

American politician from Washington

Member of the Washington Senate from the 7th district
- In office January 5, 1994 – January 1, 2013
- Preceded by: Scott Barr
- Succeeded by: John Smith

Member of the Washington House of Representatives from the 7th district
- In office November 6, 1990 – January 5, 1994
- Preceded by: Neal Kirby
- Succeeded by: Cathy McMorris Rodgers

Personal details
- Born: Harry Robert Morton; May 19, 1934 Hornell, New York
- Died: August 6, 2015 (aged 81) Spokane, Washington
- Party: Republican
- Spouse: Linda K. Morton
- Education: Alfred University (B.D.); Alfred University (B.A.)
- Profession: Methodist Minister

Harry Robert Morton (May 19, 1934 – August 7, 2015) was an American politician of the Republican Party. He was a member of the Washington State Senate and House of Representatives, representing the 7th Legislative District.

Morton was a leader of the State of Lincoln secession movement, wherein the Eastern Washington and Panhandle of Idaho would become a 51st state. He also gave Cathy McMorris Rodgers her start in politics; first as his campaign manager, then as his legislative assistant, and finally creating the vacancy in the state House of Representatives when he ascended to the State Senate, which she filled via appointment. He died on August 7, 2015.
