= Deborah Eddy =

American politician

Member of the Washington House of Representatives from the 48th district
- In office January 8, 2007 - January 14, 2013
- Preceded by: Rodney Tom
- Succeeded by: Cyrus Habib

Personal details
- Born: Deborah Hall Eddy
- Party: Democratic
- Spouse: Jon
- Education: West Virginia University, University of North Carolina at Chapel Hill
- Profession: attorney

Deborah Hall Eddy is a former Democratic member of the Washington House of Representatives, who represented the 48th district from 2007 to 2013. From 2016 to 2023, she was a member of the Growth Management Hearings Board, appointed by Gov. Jay Inslee. Active in local government since 1990, Eddy has served as mayor and on the Kirkland city council and on various regional boards and commissions. She was an adjunct professor at Seattle University's School of Law on metropolitan governance structures and municipal law.

== Family ==
Representative Eddy lives in Kirkland, Washington with her husband, Jon Eddy. They have three grown children and five grandchildren.

== Education ==
- J.D. from the University of North Carolina, 1979
- B.S from West Virginia University, 1976

== Professional Background ==
- Suburban Cities Association, Executive Director
- Cascadia Center for Regional Transportation, Senior Fellow

== Community involvement ==
- Eastside Domestic Violence Program, Founding Board Member
- Municipal League of Seattle-King County, Board Member
- Washington Appleseed, founding Board Member
- Helped establish Kirkland Alliance of Neighborhoods
- Previous Public Service Includes
  - Councilmember and Mayor of Kirkland
  - Seattle-King County Public Health Board
  - Regional Water Quality Committee
  - Various regional committees and task forces
