= Charles E. Cline =

American politician

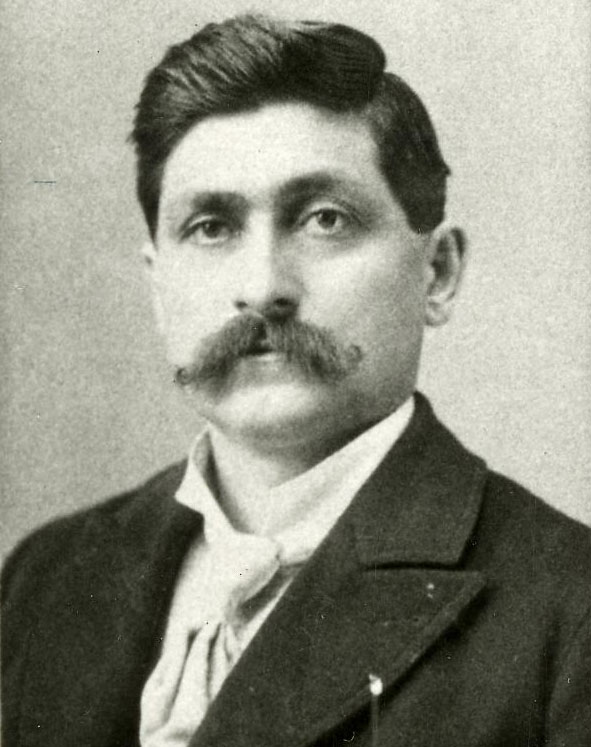
- Cline in 1897

5th Speaker of the Washington House of Representatives
- In office January 11, 1897 – January 9, 1899
- Preceded by: Ellis Morrison
- Succeeded by: E. H. Guie

Member of the Washington House of Representatives from the 48th district
- In office January 14, 1895 – January 9, 1899
- Preceded by: Michael Anderson
- Succeeded by: R. S. Lambert

Personal details
- Born: July 1858 Illinois, U.S.
- Died: January 15, 1914 (aged 55) Bellingham, Washington, U.S.
- Party: Populist

Charles E. Cline (July 1858 – January 15, 1914) was an American politician in the state of Washington. He served in the Washington House of Representatives. From 1897 to 1899, he was the Speaker of that body.
