= Jessica Forsythe =

American politician

Member-elect of the Washington House of Representatives from the 48th district
- Assuming office January 2027
- Succeeding: Amy Walen

Personal details
- Party: Democratic

Jessica Forsythe is an American politician. A member of the Democratic Party, she is the member-elect for the 48th district of the Washington House of Representatives.
