= Guié =

Guié is a surname. Notable people with the surname include:

- Abraham Gneki Guié (born 1986), Ivorian footballer
- E. H. Guie (1867–1931), American politician
- Rolf-Christel Guié-Mien (born 1977), Congolese footballer
