= Arrasmith =

Arrasmith is a surname. Notable people with the surname include:

- William Strudwick Arrasmith (1898–1965), American architect
- Anne Arrasmith (1946–2017), American artist
- Joseph W. Arrasmith (1845–1918), American politician
