= Mabel I. Miller =

American politician

Mabel Miller

Member of the Washington House of Representatives from the 48th district
- In office 1923–1927

Personal details
- Born: March 17, 1874 Waupaca, Wisconsin, US
- Died: January 15, 1951 (aged 76)
- Party: Republican

Mabel Ingersoll Miller (March 17, 1874 – January 15, 1951) was an American politician. She was a Republican, representing District 48 in the Washington House of Representatives which included parts of Snohomish County, from 1923 to 1927.
