= Frosh (disambiguation) =

A frosh, or freshman, is a person in the first year at an educational institution, usually a secondary or post-secondary school.

Frosh may also refer to:

- Brian Frosh (born 1946), American politician from Maryland
- Frosh Pond, or Drumheller Fountain, an outdoor fountain on the University of Washington campus

== See also ==
- Frosh week
