= List of first women lawyers and judges in Washington =

This is a list of the first women lawyer(s) and judge(s) in the U.S. state of Washington. It includes the year in which the women were admitted to practice law (in parentheses). Also included are women who achieved other distinctions such becoming the first in their state to graduate from law school or become a political figure.

== Firsts in Washington's history ==
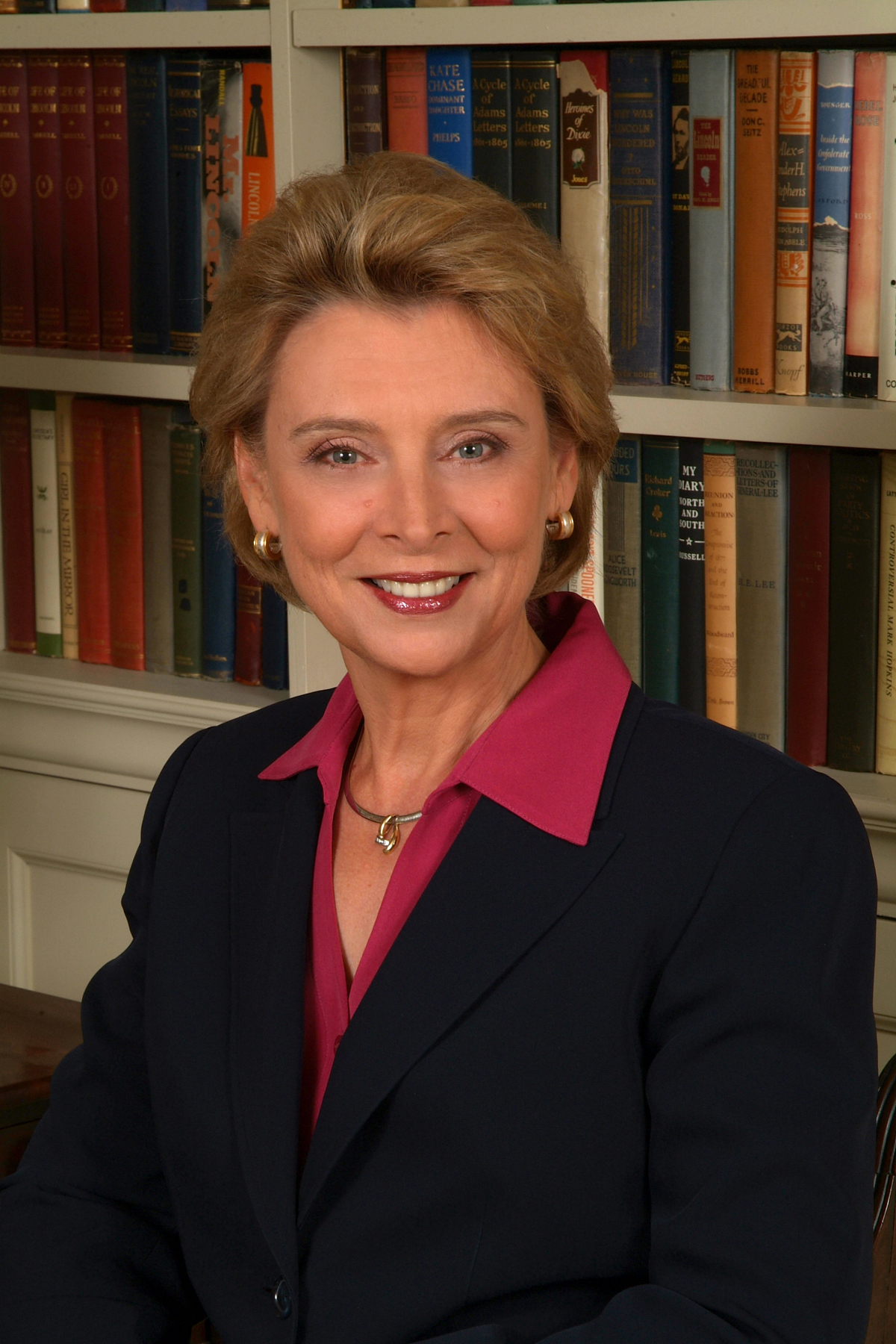
Christine Gregoire: First female Deputy Attorney General (1981) and Attorney General in Washington (1993)

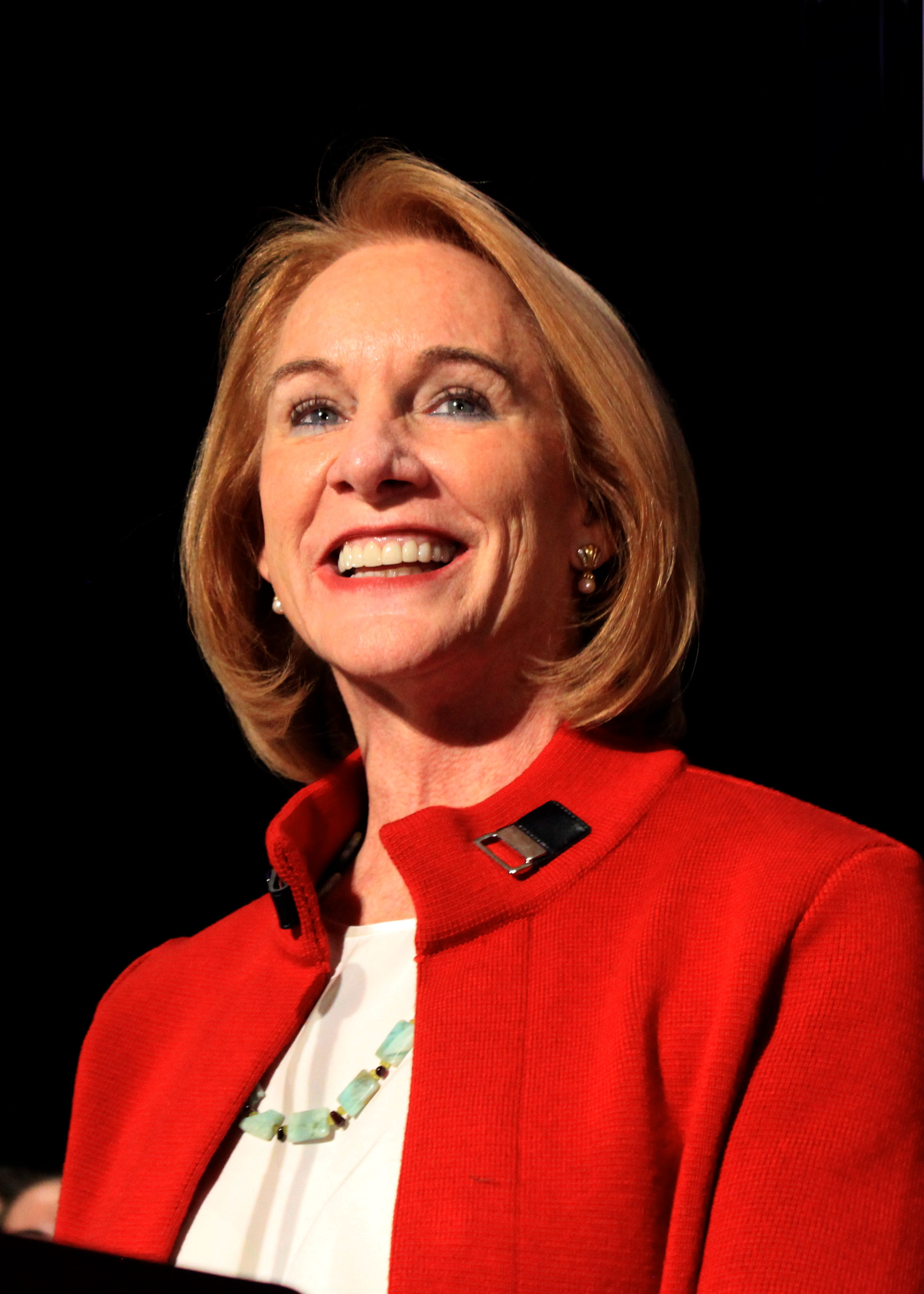
Jenny Durkan: First lesbian female to serve as a U.S. Attorney in Washington (2009)

=== Lawyers ===
- First female: Mary Leonard (1885)
- First Jewish American female: Bella Weretnikow Rosenbaum (1901)
- First Filipino American female: Dolores Sibonga (1973)
- First female quadriplegic: Holly Caudill (1995)

=== Law Clerks ===
- First female to clerk for the Washington State Court of Appeals, Division III: Victoria L. Vreeland
- First female to clerk for the Supreme Court of Washington: Susan Carlson in 2016

=== State judges ===
- First female (justice of the peace): Mildred Henthorn Hamill in 1911
- First female: Reah Whitehead (1893) in 1914
- First Latino American female: Carmen Otero in 1980
- First female (Washington Supreme Court): Carolyn R. Dimmick (1953) in 1981
- First African American female (municipal court): Norma S. Huggins in 1983
- First African American female (superior court): Norma S. Huggins in 1988
- First Asian American female: C. Kimi Kondo in 1991
- First female (Chief Justice; Washington Supreme Court): Barbara Durham in 1995
- First openly lesbian judge: Jean Rietschel c. 1996
- First Korean American (female): Mariane Spearman in 1999
- First Iranian American (female): Susan Amini in 2013
- First Asian American, Latino American, and openly lesbian (female) (Washington Supreme Court): Mary Yu (1993) in 2014
- First (African American) openly lesbian female (superior court): Helen Whitener (1998) in 2015
- First African American female (Washington Court of Appeals; Judge and Chief Judge): Lori K. Smith in 2018
- First (African American) openly lesbian female (Washington Supreme Court): Helen Whitener (1998) in 2020
- First Native American (Pueblo of Isleta/Pueblo of Laguna) (female) (Washington Supreme Court): Raquel Montoya-Lewis in 2020
- First South Asian female: Kuljinder Dhillon in 2021
- First Korean American female (Washington Court of Appeals): Janet Chung in 2022

=== Federal judges ===
- First female (U.S. District Court for the Eastern District of Washington): Rosanna M. Peterson (1991)
- First Asian American (female) (U.S. District Court for the Western District of Washington): Tana Lin in 2021
- First Native American (female) (United States District Court for the Western District of Washington): Lauren J. King in 2021

=== Attorney General of Washington ===
- First female: Christine Gregoire (1977) from 1993 to 2004

=== Assistant Attorney General ===
- First female: June Fowles in 1939

=== Deputy Attorney General ===
- First female: Christine Gregoire (1977) in 1981

=== United States Attorney ===
- Jenny Durkan (1986): First openly LGBT female appointed as a U.S. Attorney in Washington (2009)
- Vanessa Waldref: First female to serve as the United States Attorney for the Eastern District of Washington (2021)

=== Assistant United States Attorney ===
- Holly Caudill: First female quadriplegic to work as an Assistant United States Attorney in Washington (1995)

=== Political Office ===
- First female (Washington State Senate): Reba Hurn (1910) from 1923 to 1930
- Jenny Durkan (1986): First openly LGBT female (a lawyer) elected as the Mayor of Seattle, Washington (2017)
- Laurie Jinkins (1990): First openly LGBT female (a lawyer) elected as a Member of the Washington House of Representatives from the Twenty-Seventh District (2011)

=== Washington State Bar Association ===
- First female president: Elizabeth “Betty” Bracelin
- First South Asian female president: Sunitha Anjilvel in 2024

== Firsts in local history ==
- Kathryn Ann Mautz: First female judge in Eastern Washington
- Charnelle Bjelkengren: First African American female judge in Eastern Washington (2019)
- Carolyn Brown: First female to serve as a Judge of the Benton-Franklin Superior Court, Washington (1988)
- Norma Rodriguez: First Latino American female to serve as a Judge of the Benton-Franklin Superior Court, Washington (2022)
- Carol Wardell: First female judge in Chelan and Douglas Counties, Washington (1991)
- Carol Fuller: First female to serve as a superior court judge in Mason and Thurston Counties, Washington (1979)
- Susan Owens: First female judge in Clallam County, Washington
- Lauren Erickson: First female appointed as a Judge of the Clallam County Superior Court, Washington (2019)
- Barbara Johnson: First female judge in Clark County, Washington (1987)
- Camara Banfield: First African American (female) to serve as a Judge of the Clark County Superior Court (2021)
- Tsering Cornell: First Asian American (female) judge in Clark County, Washington (2022)
- Jill Johanson: First female appointed as a Judge of the Superior Court in Cowlitz County, Washington
- Eliza Forbes: First female Justice of the Peace in King County, Washington
- Carmen Otero: First Latino American female judge in King County, Washington
- Susan Amini: First Iranian American (female) to serve as a Judge of the King County Superior Court (2013)
- Kim Tran: First female of color to serve as the President of the King County Bar Association (2015)
- Leah Taguba: First Filipino American female to serve as a Judge of the King County District Court (2021)
- Leesa Manion: First (Asian American) female elected to serve as King County Prosecuting Attorney (2022)
- Leila Robinson Sawtelle (1882): First female lawyer in Seattle, Washington (King County, Washington, 1884)
- Bella Weretnikow Rosenbaum (1901): First Jewish American female lawyer in Seattle, Washington [King County, Washington]
- Othilia Carroll Beals: First female Justice of the Peace in Seattle, Washington [King County, Washington]
- C. Kimi Kondo: First Asian American female to serve as a Judge of the Seattle Municipal Court in Washington (c. 1991)
- Erika Evans: First African American (female) to serve as the City Attorney of Seattle, King County, Washington (2026)
- Marcine Anderson: First female (and Asian American) elected as a Judge of the Shoreline District Court (King County, Washington; 2010)
- Betty Fletcher: First female to serve as the President of the South King County Bar Association, Washington (1972)
- Tracy Flood: First African American female judge in Kitsap County, Washington (2021)
- Jo Anne Alumbaugh (1979): First female lawyer in Kittitas County, Washington
- Joely O’Rourke: First female judge in Lewis County, Washington
- Helen Whitener (1998): First openly LGBT and African American female to serve as Judge of the Pierce County Superior Court, Washington (2015)
- Diane Clarkson: First African American female (and African American in general) to serve as the President of the Tacoma-Pierce County Bar Association, Washington (2016)
- Mary Robnett: First female to serve as the Prosecuting Attorney for Pierce County, Washington (2019)
- Kay Trumbull (1974): First female Judge of the Superior Court in Snohomish County, Washington
- Whitney Rivera: First Asian American Pacific Islander female to serve as a Judge of the Snohomish County Superior Court (2024)
- Reba Hurn (1910): First female lawyer in Spokane, Washington [Spokane County, Washington]
- Kathleen Taft (1935): First female judicial officer (a commissioner) in Spokane County, Washington (1950)
- Kathleen O’Connor (1975): First female Judge of the Superior Court of Spokane County, Washington
- Gloria Ochoa-Bruck: First Latino American female judge in Spokane County, Washington
- Charnelle Bjelkengren: First African American female to become a Judge of the Superior Court of Spokane County, Washington (2019)
- Julia W. Ker (1912): First female lawyer in Olympia, Washington. She was also the first female police judge in Washington and the U.S. (1926). [Thurston County, Washington]
- Sally Elke: First female Justice of the Peace in Tumwater, Washington (1942) [Thurston County, Washington]
- Carol Fuller: First female to serve as a superior court judge in Mason and Thurston Counties, Washington (1979)
- Aurel M. Kelly (1949): First female lawyer in Walla Walla, Washington [Walla Walla County, Washington]
- Sandy Flores (2008): First Latin American female lawyer in Walla Walla County, Washington
- Patricia Fulton: First female to serve as a Judge of the Superior Court of Walla Walla County, Washington (2025)
- Elizabeth M. Balas: First female lawyer in Whatcom County, Washington
- Raquel Montoya-Lewis: First Native American (Pueblo of Isleta/Pueblo of Laguna) female judge in Whatcom County, Washington (2015)
- Sonia Rodriguez True: First Latino American (female) to serve as a Commissioner (2020) and Judge (2022) of the Yakima County Superior Court
- Bree Black Horse: First Native American (female) appointed as a Judge of the Yakima County Superior Court (2026)

== See also ==
- List of first women lawyers and judges in the United States
- Timeline of women lawyers in the United States
- Women in law

== Other topics of interest ==
- List of first minority male lawyers and judges in the United States
- List of first minority male lawyers and judges in Washington
