= Joan McBride =

American politician (born 1951 or 1952)

Member of the Washington House of Representatives from the 48th district
- In office January 12, 2015 – January 14, 2019
- Preceded by: Cyrus Habib
- Succeeded by: Amy Walen

Mayor of Kirkland, Washington
- In office January 1, 2010 – January 1, 2014
- Preceded by: James L. Lauinger
- Succeeded by: Amy Walen

Personal details
- Born: Joan Leslie McBride; 1951 or 1952 (age 74–75)
- Party: Democratic
- Education: Evergreen State College (BA)
- Website: Legislative website

Joan Leslie McBride (born 1951 or 1952) is an American politician. A Democrat, she was the mayor of Kirkland, Washington, from 2010 to 2013, after which she was elected to the Washington House of Representatives as a member from District 48. She also served on the Kirkland City Council since 1998, sitting as deputy mayor from 2002 until her election as mayor in 2010.

McBride originally announced a bid to succeed state Senator Rodney Tom. However, in April 2014, she and state Representative Cyrus Habib announced they would switch races, with Habib running for Tom's seat and McBride running to replace Habib in the House. McBride was elected in November and sworn on January 12, 2015. She was named assistant Democratic whip.

McBride announced her retirement from the State legislature on March 29, 2018.

== Personal life ==
McBride is married with children. She has a background in nonprofit work and community relations. She resides in Kirkland.
