= W. H. Hare =

American politician

Dr. W. H. Hare
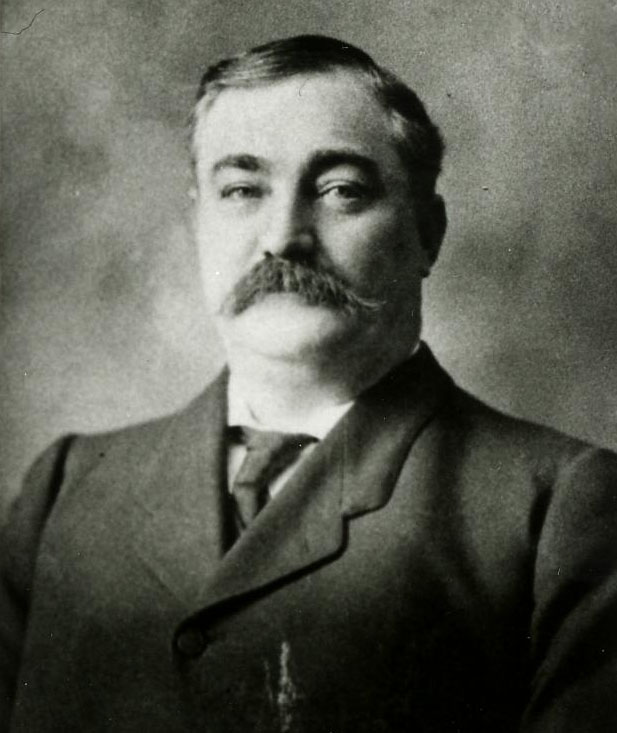
- Hare in 1903

8th Speaker of the Washington House of Representatives
- In office January 12, 1903 – January 9, 1905
- Preceded by: R. B. Albertson
- Succeeded by: Joseph George Megler

Member of the Washington House of Representatives for the 20th district
- In office 1903–1907

Personal details
- Born: May 13, 1853 Barnesville, Ohio, United States
- Died: November 21, 1921 (aged 68) Spokane, Washington, United States
- Party: Republican

William H. Hare (May 13, 1853 – November 21, 1921) was an American politician in the state of Washington. He served in the Washington House of Representatives. From 1903 to 1905, he was the Speaker of that body.
