= Ellis Morrison =

American politician

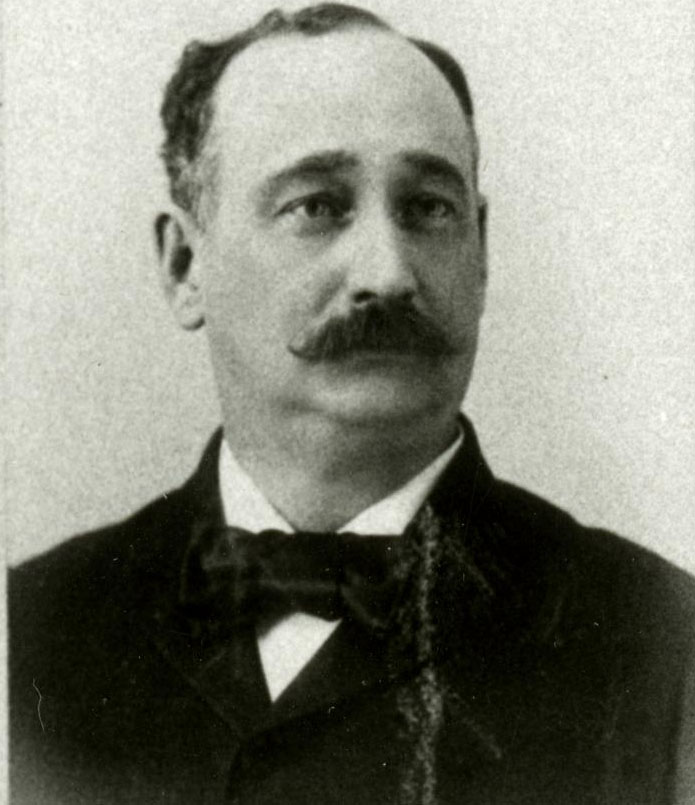
- Morrison in 1895

4th Speaker of the Washington House of Representatives
- In office January 14, 1895 – January 11, 1897
- Preceded by: Joseph W. Arrasmith
- Succeeded by: Charles E. Cline

Member of the Washington House of Representatives from the 38th district
- In office January 9, 1893 – January 11, 1897
- Preceded by: George B. Walker
- Succeeded by: Van R. Pierson

Personal details
- Born: May 20, 1850 Butler County, Pennsylvania, U.S.
- Died: September 13, 1914 (aged 64) Seattle, Washington, U.S.
- Party: Republican

Ellis Morrison (May 20, 1850 – September 13, 1914) was an American politician who served as a member of the Washington House of Representatives, representing the 38th district from 1893 to 1897. From 1895 to 1897, he was the Speaker of that body.
