= Moses Bull =

American politician

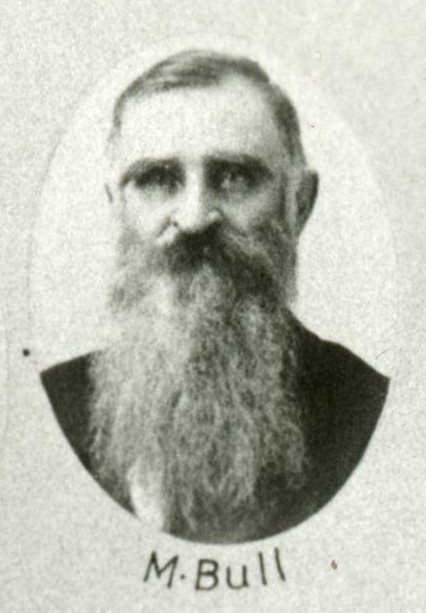
- Bull in 1895

Member of the Washington House of Representatives from the 7th district
- In office January 14, 1895 – January 11, 1897
- Preceded by: Joseph W. Arrasmith
- Succeeded by: John L. Canutt

Personal details
- Born: January 15, 1830 Michigan Territory, U.S.
- Died: December 29, 1896 (aged 66) Pullman, Washington, U.S.
- Party: Republican

Moses Bull (January 15, 1830 – December 29, 1896) was an American politician in the state of Washington. He served in the Washington House of Representatives from 1895 to 1897, alongside W. S. Johnston.
