= Jacquelin Maycumber =

American politician (born 1979)

Member of the Washington House of Representatives from the 7th district
- In office February 2, 2017 – January 13, 2025
- Preceded by: Shelly Short
- Succeeded by: Andrew Engell

Personal details
- Born: Jacquelin Michelle Anderson; 1979 (age 46–47) Kirkland, Washington, U.S.
- Party: Republican
- Spouse: Marty Maycumber
- Children: 3
- Education: Colorado College (BS)
- Website: State House website

Jacquelin Michelle Maycumber (née Anderson, born 1979) is an American politician of the Republican Party. She is a former member of the Washington House of Representatives, representing the 7th Legislative District.

== Education ==
She graduated from Republic High School in 1998. In 2002, she earned a BS in biochemistry from Colorado College. She also graduated from the Law Enforcement Academy in El Paso County, Colorado.

== Career ==
Maycumber served as the legislative assistant to Representative Shelly Short. She also served on the Republic School Board.

In February 2017, Maycumber was appointed to serve the remaining term of Representative Shelly Short after Short was appointed to the Senate. Maycumber won her retention election in November 2017. She served three terms as Minority Floor Leader.

On February 20, 2024, Maycumber officially announced her campaign for Washington's 5th congressional district. She received 13.63% of the vote in the August primary, placing third out of eleven candidates, behind Republican Michael Baumgartner and Democrat Carmela Conroy. Maycumber did not advance to the general election.

On March 26, 2024, Maycumber donated $5,500 to the Washington State Republican Party. Two days later, the party donated $5,000 to her Congressional campaign. The filing transfer was not initially reported as required by state law, but was filed as an amendment to Maycumber's March filings and only became public in May. Emry Dinman of The Spokesman-Review wrote that a "message sent to candidates by the chair of the state GOP", Jim Walsh, "suggests the party was willing to act as a pass-through in circumvention of the rule." As of July 18, 2024, the Washington State Public Disclosure Commission was still reviewing the complaint.

In May 2024, the Washington State Labor Council (WSLC) endorsed two candidates for Congress in Washington's 5th congressional district, Maycumber and Carmela Conroy. The WSLC typically only endorses progressive candidates for elected positions.

She currently works as the chief strategy officer for the rural health care provider, New Health.

== Political views ==
In announcing her candidacy for Congress, Maycumber mentioned protecting the Lower Snake River dams from efforts to breach them and stopping the flow of fentanyl across the U.S.-Mexico border as two of her top legislative priorities.

In the June 4, 2024 debate of Washington's 5th congressional district candidates, Maycumber stated that she had "grave doubts" about Biden's victory in the 2020 election. Maycumber endorsed Nikki Haley for President in 2024.

On June 17, 2024, "Maycumber said she was interested in some kind of time limit (on abortions), pointing to efforts for a 16- to 18-week ban, but did not say where exactly she would prefer to draw that line," and "she said she supported Idaho’s 'abortion trafficking' law and argued that combating human trafficking should be a priority for the government."

== Personal life ==
She is married with three children.

== Awards ==
- 2020 Guardians of Small Business. Presented by NFIB.
