= Amos F. Shaw =

American politician

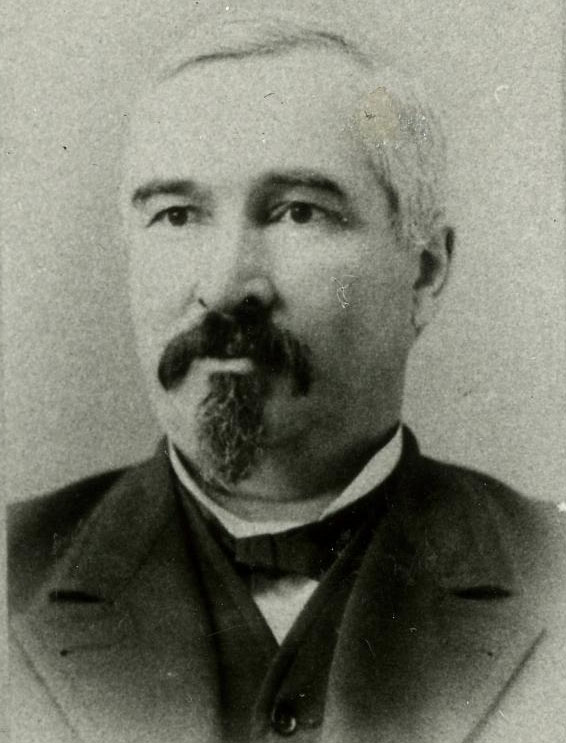
- Shaw in 1891

2nd Speaker of the Washington House of Representatives
- In office January 7, 1891 – January 9, 1893
- Preceded by: J. W. Feighan
- Succeeded by: Joseph W. Arrasmith

Member of the Washington House of Representatives from the 22nd district
- In office January 7, 1891 – January 9, 1893
- Preceded by: Constituency established
- Succeeded by: R. T. Cowan

Member of the Washington House of Representatives
- In office November 6, 1889 – January 9, 1891
- Preceded by: Position established
- Succeeded by: Position abolished

Personal details
- Born: January 14, 1839 New Hampshire, U.S.
- Died: May 16, 1898 (aged 59) Vancouver, Washington, U.S.
- Party: Republican

Amos F. Shaw (January 14, 1839 – May 16, 1898) was an American politician in the state of Washington. He served in the Washington House of Representatives from 1889 to 1893, and he was Speaker of the House from 1891 to 1893.
