= Shelly Short =

American politician from Washington

Member of the Washington State Senate from the 7th district
- Incumbent
- Assumed office February 1, 2017
- Preceded by: Brian Dansel

Member of the Washington House of Representatives from the 7th, Position 1 district
- In office January 12, 2009 – February 1, 2017
- Preceded by: Bob Sump
- Succeeded by: Jacquelin Maycumber

Personal details
- Born: Shelly Anne Hager; April 3, 1962 (age 64) Spokane, Washington, U.S.
- Party: Republican
- Spouse(s): Byron Ray Care (1982-1988), Mitchel Jay "Mitch" Short (1989-present)
- Children: 2
- Education: Spokane Community College (attended), Eastern Washington University (attended)
- Occupation: Paralegal, Legislative assistant, Politician
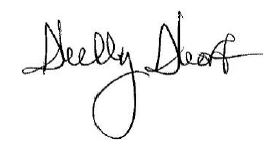
- Signature
- Website: Official

Shelly Anne Short (née Hager; born April 3, 1962) is an American politician from Washington. Short is a Republican member of the Washington Senate, representing the 7th Legislative District. Short replaced Brian Dansel, who resigned to accept a position in the Trump Administration.

== Early life and education ==
Short attended Spokane Falls Community College before transferring to Eastern Washington University. Prior to entering politics, she worked in the legal field as both a legal secretary and a paralegal. In 1995, she began working in public service when she established the Northeastern Washington district office for U.S. Representative George Nethercutt.

== Awards ==
- 2014 Guardians of Small Business award. Presented by NFIB.
- 2021 City Champion Awards. Presented by Association of Washington Cities (AWC).

== Personal life ==
Short's husband is Mitch Short. Short has two children. Short and her family live in Addy, Washington.

== Electoral history ==
Washington's 7th legislative district House 1 election, 2008
Party	Candidate	Votes	%
Republican	Shelly Short	30,356	57.38
Republican	Sue Lani Madsen	22,544	42.62
Invalid or blank votes			
Total votes		52,900	100.00
Turnout			

Washington's 7th legislative district House 1 election, 2010
Party	Candidate	Votes	%
Republican	Shelly Short (inc.)	27,084	100.00
Invalid or blank votes			
Total votes		27,084	100.00
Turnout			

Washington's 7th legislative district House 1 general election, 2012
Party	Candidate	Votes	%
Republican	Shelly Short (inc.)	43,631	100.00
Invalid or blank votes			
Total votes		43,631	100.00
Turnout			

Washington's 7th legislative district House 1 general election, 2014
Party	Candidate	Votes	%
Republican	Shelly Short (inc.)	37,648	79.8
Libertarian	James R. Apker	9,528	20.2
Total votes		47,176	100.00
Turnout			
Republican hold			

Washington's 7th legislative district House 1 election, 2016
Primary election
Party	Candidate	Votes	%
Republican	Shelly Short (inc.)	25,075	100.0
General election
Republican	Shelly Short (inc.)	56,589	100.0
Republican hold			

Washington's 7th State Senate election, 2022
Primary election
Party	Candidate	Votes	%
Republican	Shelly Short (inc.)	33,274	96.31
Write-in		1274	3.69
Total votes		34,548	100.0
General election
Republican	Shelly Short (inc.)	51,661	96.93
Write-in		1638	3.07
Total votes		53,299	100.0
Republican hold			
