= R. B. Albertson =

American politician

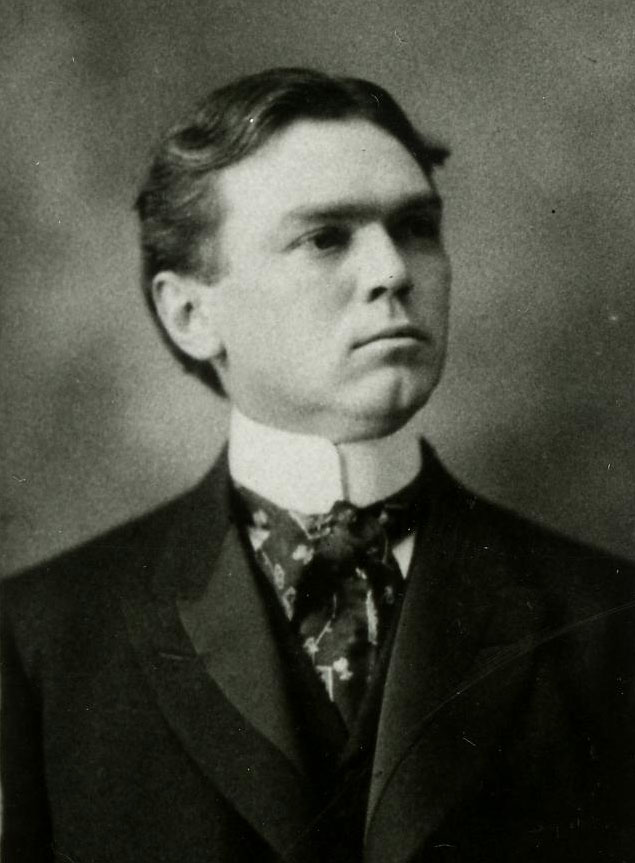
- Albertson in 1901

7th Speaker of the Washington House of Representatives
- In office January 14, 1901 – January 12, 1903
- Preceded by: E. H. Guie
- Succeeded by: W. H. Hare

Member of the Washington House of Representatives for the 42nd district
- In office 1895–1897; 1901–1903

Personal details
- Born: December 21, 1859 Hertford, North Carolina, United States
- Died: October 3, 1917 (aged 57) Seattle, Washington, United States
- Party: Republican

Robert Brooke Albertson (December 21, 1859 – October 3, 1917) was an American politician in the state of Washington. He served in the Washington House of Representatives. From 1901 to 1903, he was the Speaker of that body.
