= Joseph Drumheller =

American politician (1920–1977)

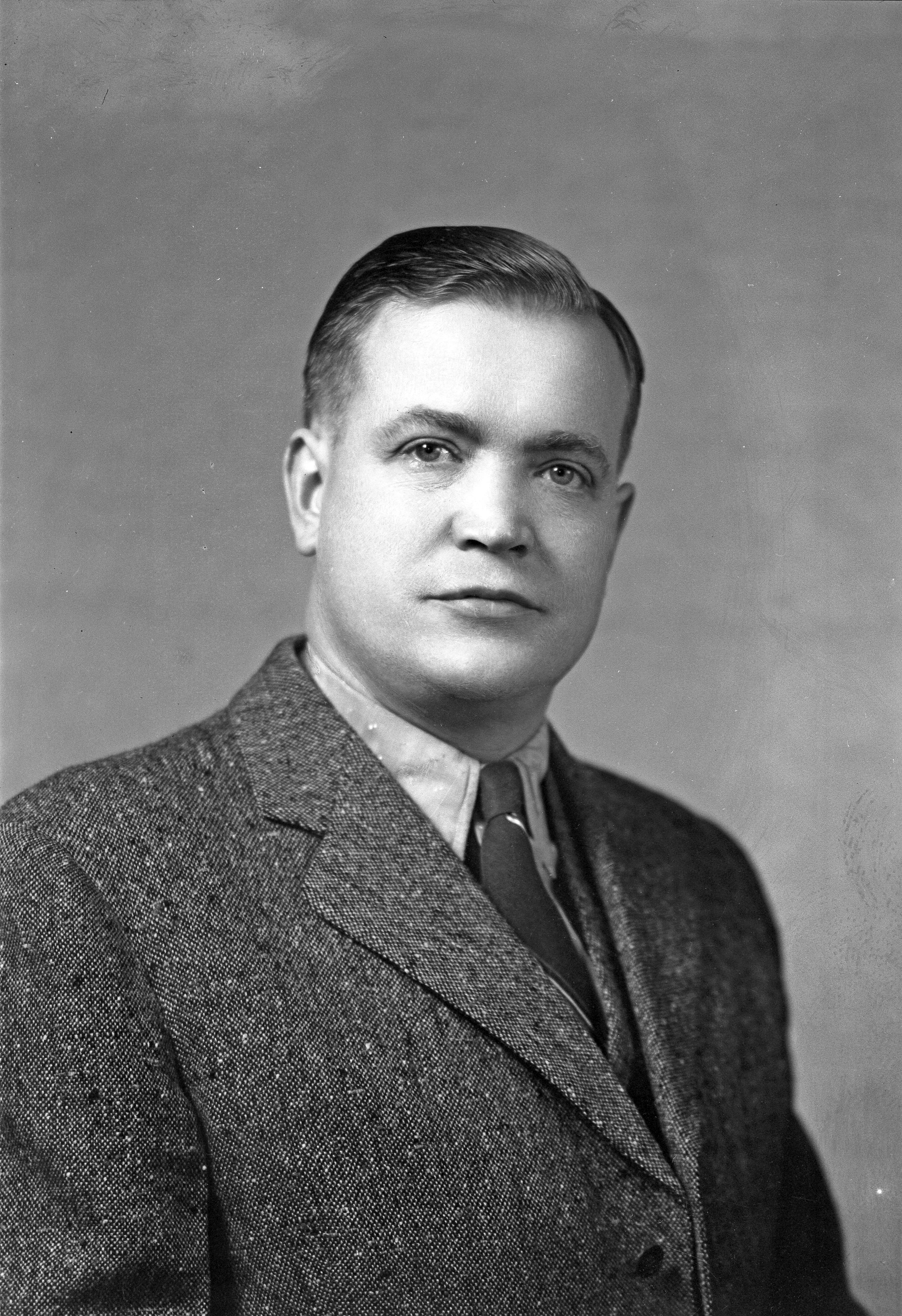
- Drumheller in 1941

Member of the Washington Senate from the 7th district
- In office 1935–1942
- Preceded by: Charles H. Voss
- Succeeded by: David C. Cowen

Personal details
- Born: September 25, 1900 Spokane, Washington, U.S.
- Died: April 18, 1970 (aged 69) Spokane, Washington, U.S.
- Party: Democratic
- Education: University of Washington

Joseph Drumheller (September 25, 1900 – April 18, 1970) was an American chemical engineer and politician in the state of Washington. He was a Democratic member of the Washington State Senate between 1935 and 1942, representing the 7th district. He was also a member of the Board of Regents for the University of Washington between 1945 and 1950 and then from 1956 to 1968.

== Early life ==
Drumheller was born on September 25, 1900, in Spokane, Washington. He came from a pioneering family; his father, Daniel M. Drumheller, held various positions during his travels from Missouri to California in 1854 and his mother was Eleanor Drumheller (née Powell). His maternal grandfather, Leonard J. Powell, was the president of the University of Washington between 1882 and 1887. He attended local public schools and then received a bachelor of sciences degree in chemical engineering from the University of Washington in 1923.

=== Marriages ===
The following year, he married Katharine Corbin and the couple had two children: Mary K. and Frederick C. The divorced in 1928 and he remarried in 1936, to Dorothea Limacher. In the 1950s, he remarried for a third time, to Helen Elizabeth Chamberlain.

== Career ==
Drumheller founded a chemical manufacturing company, Drumheller Analytical Laboratories, in 1924. He represented the 7th district in the Washington State Senate between 1935 and 1942 as a Democrat. He was a member of the Board of Regents for the University of Washington between 1945 and 1950 and then from 1956 to 1968, serving as president between 1949 and 1950 and then from 1961 to 1962.

=== Communism investigations ===
During his first stint on the board, he pushed for the state Democratic Party to conduct an internal investigation to expel any suspected communists. During the Canwell Committee investigations, to determine whether members of the university faculty were communists, Drumheller and fellow regents Dave Beck and George R. Stuntz, supported the investigations and voted in favor of dismissing the staff who were determined to be communists.

=== Affiliations ===
He served as a regent at Gonzaga University during the late 1950s, as president of the Spokane Chamber of Commerce between 1948 and 1949, and as a director of Pacific Northwest Bell, the Sunshine Mining Company and the First National Bank of Spokane. Between 1960 and 1964, he was a member of the Spokane City Council.

== Death and legacy ==
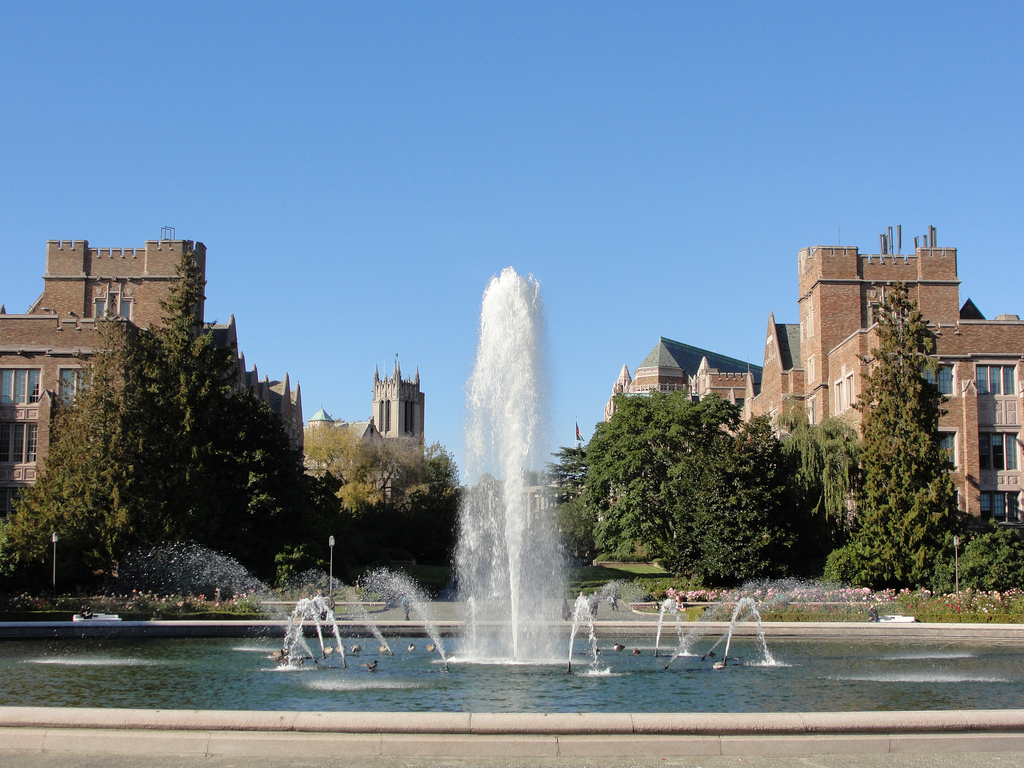
Drumheller Fountain in 2009

Drumheller died on April 18, 1970, in Spokane at the age of 69. He gifted the University of Washington the Drumheller Fountain, which sits in the center of Frosh Pond, for its centennial celebration in 1961.
