= J. W. Feighan =

American politician

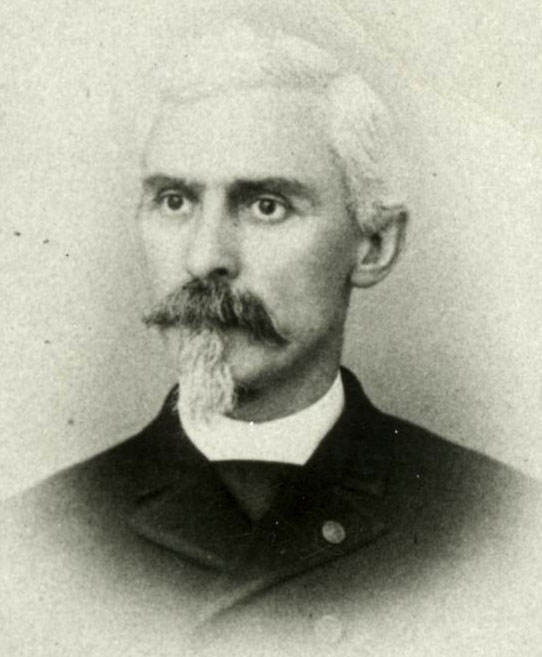
- Feighan in 1889

1st Speaker of the Washington House of Representatives
- In office November 6, 1889 – January 7, 1891
- Preceded by: Position established
- Succeeded by: Amos F. Shaw

Member of the Washington House of Representatives
- In office November 6, 1889 – January 7, 1891
- Preceded by: Position established
- Succeeded by: Position abolished

Personal details
- Born: April 5, 1845 Buffalo, New York, U.S.
- Died: May 28, 1898 (aged 53) Spokane, Washington, U.S.
- Party: Republican

John W. Feighan (April 5, 1845 – May 28, 1898) was an American politician in the state of Washington. He served in the Washington House of Representatives from 1889 to 1891, during which time he also served as Speaker of the House.
