= Brian Dansel =

American politician (born 1983)

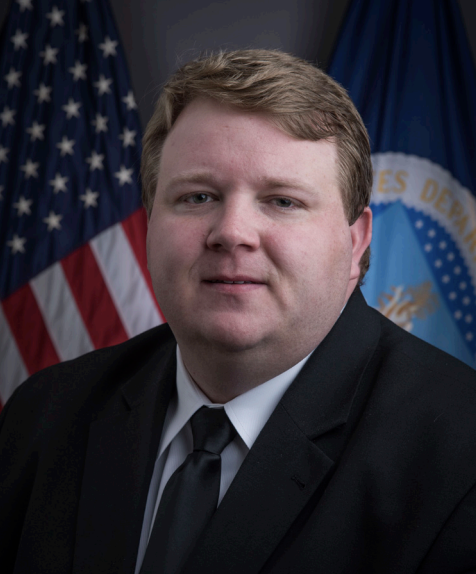

Member of the Washington Senate from the 7th district
- In office December 6, 2013 – January 24, 2017
- Preceded by: John Smith
- Succeeded by: Shelly Short

Personal details
- Born: Brian Ross Dansel; April 2, 1983 (age 43) Republic, Washington, U.S.
- Party: Republican
- Education: Walla Walla Community College (AA)

Brian Ross Dansel (born April 2, 1983) is an American politician, political advisor, and current member of the Franklin County Board of Commissioners. Before that he was a Special Assistant to the United States Secretary of Agriculture in the Trump Administration. He was previously a Republican member of the Washington State Senate from the 7th Legislative District. Dansel won the seat in the 2013 election, in which he defeated appointed senator John Smith, and was sworn in on December 6, 2013.

In a letter to the Washington State Office of Governor dated January 24, 2017, Dansel resigned as senator for the seventh district and vacated his seat after accepting a position with the Trump Administration as a Special Assistant to the Secretary of Agriculture. In early November, he returned to Washington state to be the director of the state's USDA Farm Service Agency.

In 2023, he became a Ferry County Commissioner.

== Washington State Senate ==
Dansel represented Douglas, Ferry, Okanogan, Pend Oreille, and Stevens Counties, along with portions of Grant and Spokane Counties. An earlier redistricting proposal from 2021 would have divided Okanogan County between the 7th and 13th districts.

=== Elections ===
In 2013, Dansel ran against incumbent Republican senator John Smith. On November 5, 2013, Dansel defeated Smith with 54% of the vote.

During his campaign for state senate, Dansel received the endorsement of the Washington Education Association and a $500 contribution from the Spokane Committee on Political Education, a political action committee under the AFL-CIO. Smith claimed that Dansel was a "tool of unions" throughout the campaign. Dansel responded by asserting that "he'll listen to anyone, whether they agree with him or not."

Washington State Senate special election from the 7th District, 2013
Party	Candidate	Votes	%
Republican	Brian Dansel	18,873	54
Republican	John Smith (Incumbent)	16,324	46

== 2024 congressional run ==
On February 10, 2024, Dansel announced that he would be a candidate for the United States House of Representatives to succeed Cathy McMorris Rodgers, who is not seeking reelection. On April 19, his campaign was endorsed by the Washington State Republican Party during the State convention.

On August 6, 2024, Dansel lost the primary, placing in a distant fifth with 11% of the vote. He promptly announced his retirement from politics, and deleted his Twitter account.
