= Cyrus Habib =

American Jesuit and former politician

Cyrus Habib SJ
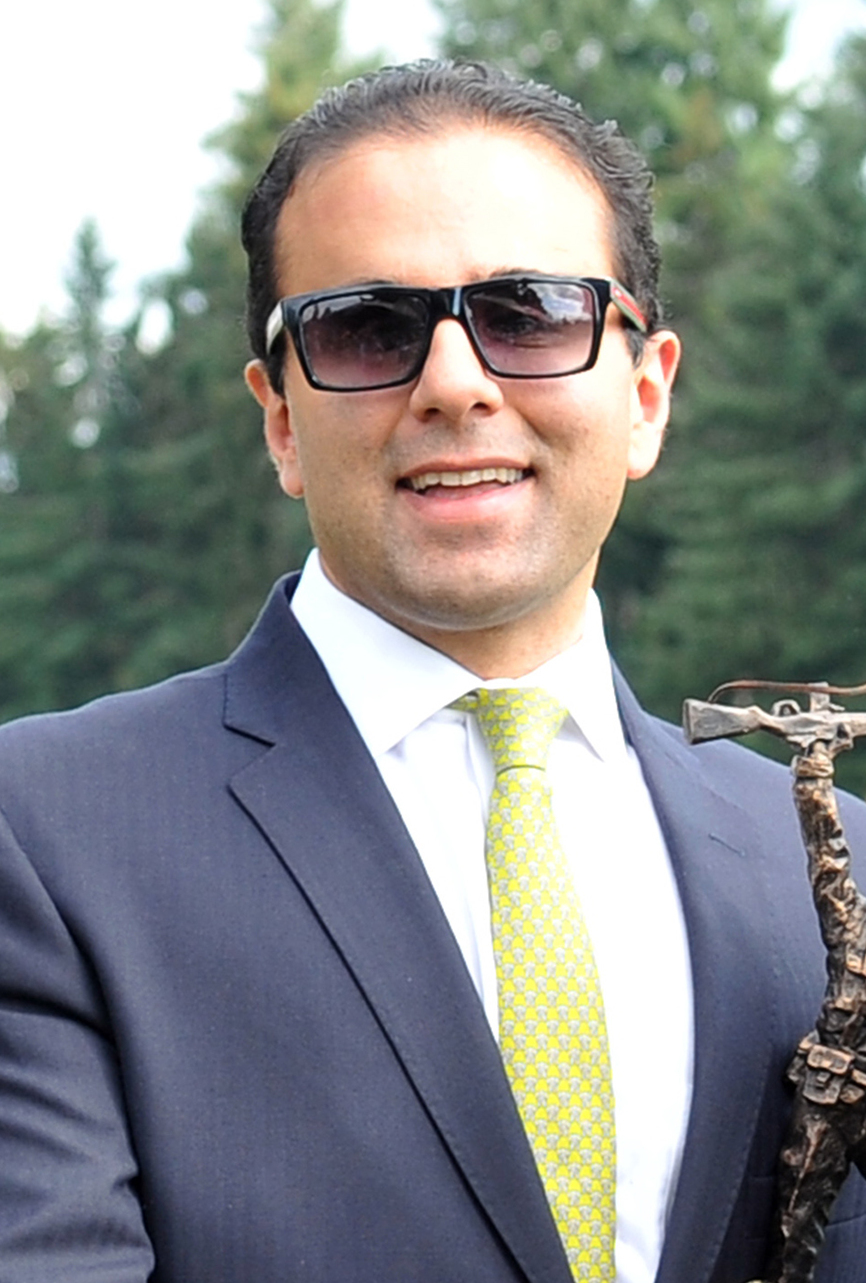
- Habib in 2017

16th Lieutenant Governor of Washington
- In office January 11, 2017 – January 13, 2021
- Governor: Jay Inslee
- Preceded by: Brad Owen
- Succeeded by: Denny Heck

Member of the Washington Senate from the 48th district
- In office January 12, 2015 – January 4, 2017
- Preceded by: Rodney Tom
- Succeeded by: Patty Kuderer

Member of the Washington House of Representatives from the 48th district
- In office January 14, 2013 – January 12, 2015
- Preceded by: Deborah Eddy
- Succeeded by: Joan McBride

Personal details
- Born: Kamyar Cyrus Habib; August 22, 1981 (age 45) Baltimore, Maryland, U.S.
- Party: Democratic
- Parents: Mo Habib (father); Susan Amini (mother)
- Education: Columbia University (BA); Oxford University (MLitt); Yale University (JD)
- Website: Official website

Kamyar Cyrus Habib SJ (born August 22, 1981) is an American Jesuit, lawyer, and former politician who served as a state legislator from 2013 to 2017 and then as the 16th lieutenant governor of Washington from 2017 to 2021. He also served as the state's acting governor for over six months, primarily in 2019 during the presidential campaign of Governor Jay Inslee. He is the first Iranian American to hold statewide elected office in the United States.

He has been fully blind since he lost his eyesight to cancer at age eight. In March 2020, he announced plans to retire from politics at the end of his term and become a Jesuit priest within the Catholic Church.

== Early life and education ==
Habib was born in Baltimore, Maryland, to parents who had previously immigrated to the U.S. from Iran. Their last name was originally Habibelahian (Persian: حبیب‌الهیان). He is the son of Superior Court Judge Susan Amini and engineer and investor Mo Habib, who were both raised in non practicing Muslim households. A three-time cancer survivor, he lost his eyesight and became fully blind at age eight. Shortly afterwards, his family moved to Bellevue, Washington. Habib graduated from the Bellevue International School in 1999.

In 2003 he received his B.A. from Columbia University summa cum laude and Phi Beta Kappa, having double majored in English and comparative literature and Middle Eastern studies as a student of Edward Said and Jacques Derrida. While an undergraduate, Habib had a collection of his photography published by Princeton Architectural Press, and also worked in the New York City office of Senator Hillary Clinton. He was named a Truman Scholar in 2002.

As a Rhodes Scholar, Habib obtained a Master of Letters in postcolonial English literature from St. John's College at the University of Oxford, where he was an active member of the Oxford Union, and wrote his masters thesis on Ralph Ellison and Salman Rushdie. Following his time at Oxford, he worked at Goldman Sachs in New York, studied law at Yale Law School, and was named a Soros Fellow in 2007.

Habib earned a Juris Doctor from Yale in 2009, where he served as an editor of The Yale Law Journal. He was a member of the university's Grand Strategy program, and also advocated for the redesign of U.S. currency to allow the blind to distinguish denominations. His roommate at Yale was Ronan Farrow, and the two of them were also close friends with Elizabeth Wurtzel.

After graduating from Yale, Habib practiced law at the Seattle headquarters of Perkins Coie, where from 2009 to 2017 he advised technology startups, and led the firm's civic and community initiatives.

== Political career ==
=== State legislature ===
In 2012, Habib won a seat in the Washington House of Representatives, defeating two-term Redmond City Councilman Hank Myers and gaining 61% of the vote. He was elected to represent Washington's 48th Legislative District, which includes Bellevue, Clyde Hill, Hunts Point, Kirkland, Medina, Redmond, and Yarrow Point. Habib set a record for the most money ever raised in a State House race in Washington. In the House of Representatives, Habib was selected by his peers to serve as Vice Chair of the House Committee on Technology and Economic Development.

In 2014, Habib was elected to the Washington State Senate with 65% of the vote to succeed controversial Senate Majority Leader Rodney Tom as State Senator from the 48th Legislative District. Immediately after his election to the State Senate, Habib was elected Senate Democratic Whip by his fellow Democrats, placing him in one of the top leadership positions in the State Senate.

=== Lieutenant governor ===
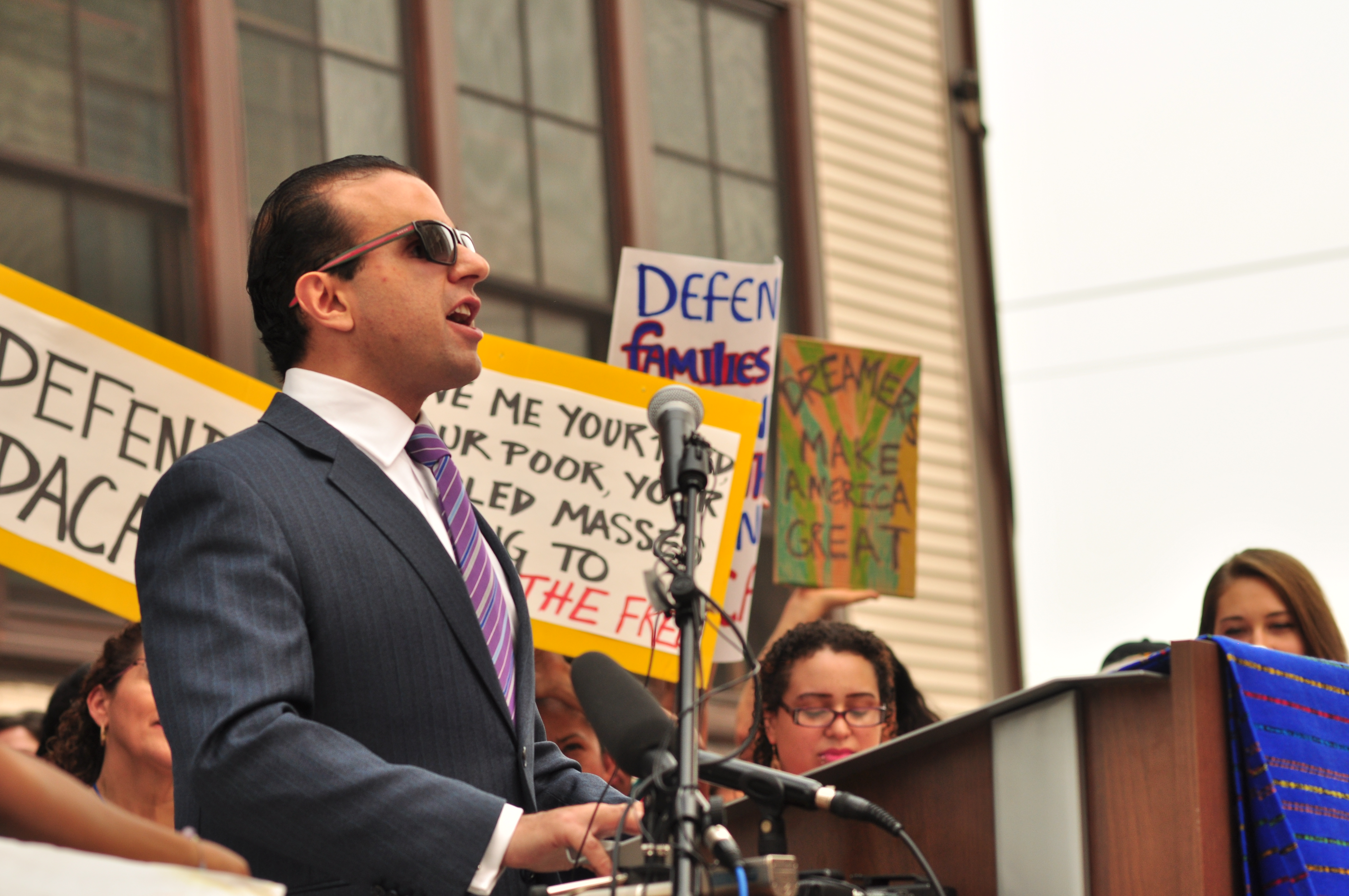
Habib addressing Defend DACA rally, Seattle, September 5, 2017

Shortly before the 2016 legislative session, Habib announced his campaign for the independently elected office of Lieutenant Governor of Washington, challenging embattled twenty-year incumbent Brad Owen. Several months later, Owen, who had previously filed campaign paperwork, announced that he would in fact not seek reelection. Habib went on to win the primary election against ten other candidates, including long-time State Senators Karen Fraser and Steve Hobbs. Another senior legislator, Speaker pro tem of the Washington House of Representatives Jim Moeller was also a candidate but ultimately discontinued his campaign. Habib defeated Republican Marty McClendon by a nine-point margin in the November 2016 general election. He set another record by raising $1.1 million, and was supported in his campaign by President Barack Obama, who endorsed him and recorded robocalls encouraging voters to cast their ballots for him.

=== Democratic Party Leadership ===
During his time in office, Habib also served as a member of the Democratic National Committee, and as co-chair of the Democratic Lt. Governor's Association. In 2016, Habib was chosen by the leadership of the Democratic National Committee to serve as one of 25 appointed members of the party's Platform Committee.

Habib served as western co-chair of Pete Buttigieg's 2020 campaign for president.

== Other affiliations ==
During his career in state politics, Habib maintained a number of other affiliations. Beginning in 2013, he was Professor and Distinguished Lawmaker in Residence at the Seattle University School of Law, teaching upper-level courses.

A member of the Council on Foreign Relations, he has also served on the boards of a number of nonprofit organizations, including the Seattle Symphony, Seattle Children's Hospital Foundation, and the 5th Avenue Theatre.

== Religious vocation ==
On March 19, 2020, Habib announced he would not run for re-election, and that he had decided to end his political career and become a Catholic priest. He had converted to Catholicism while studying at Oxford, and throughout his years in politics attended Mass at Seattle's St. James Cathedral. He began considering the priesthood in 2018 and was accepted by the Jesuits in 2019, with his entry deferred until the end of his term as lieutenant governor. Of the decision, he wrote in the Jesuits' America magazine that:

Over the past couple of years ... I have felt a calling to dedicate my life in a more direct and personal way to serving the marginalized, empowering the vulnerable, healing those who suffer from spiritual wounds and accompanying those discerning their own futures.... I have come to believe that the best way to deepen my commitment to social justice is to reduce the complexity in my own life and dedicate it to serving others.

At the time, New York Times columnist Frank Bruni wrote that there was good reason to believe that, were he to stay in politics, Habib would be elected Governor by the age of 40.

He entered the two-year Jesuit Novitiate of the Three Companions in Culver City, California in the fall of 2020. On August 13, 2022, Habib professed vows of poverty, chastity and obedience as a Jesuit.

== Political priorities ==
As Lieutenant Governor, Habib also served as President of the Washington State Senate. He made expanding equitable access to higher education and promoting job growth through international trade his office priorities.

In Washington, the Lieutenant Governor traditionally acts as a trade ambassador for the state. Habib led a number of international trips on behalf of the state aimed at improving market access for Washington-based companies and encouraging foreign investment and cultural exchanges.

=== Education ===
In 2018, he attacked the idea that "college isn't for everyone", calling it an "elitist" view, and said that "A failure to expand access to higher education will widen the gap between the fortunate few and the disenfranchised many." In 2020, his office introduced a legislative package focused on removing barriers in Washington state's higher education system. It required all school districts to share financial aid information with twelfth-grade students and their families, the creation of a single college application process for public four-year institutions, and legislation that prevented institutions of higher education from denying students access to their transcripts as a means of debt collection.

In his time in office, Habib established a number of college pathway programs for underserved and non-traditional student populations. In 2018, he founded Washington World Fellows, a global leadership program for high school students that includes a study abroad experience and two years of college preparation programming aimed at supporting first-generation college students. The same year, he initiated Complete Washington, a program focused on creating new high-demand degree pathways tailored to the needs of working adults.

In addition to his higher education programs, Habib created the leadership-oriented Boundless Washington program, which seeks to empower young people with disabilities through outdoor exploration and leadership training. He summited Mount Kilimanjaro in the summer of 2019 to help raise money for the program.

In 2019, Habib led a delegation to Dharamshala to meet with the Dalai Lama, where the two engaged in a televised dialogue as part of the establishment of Habib's Compassion Scholars program in Washington State, which he launched to promote more ethical leadership training in public high schools.

=== Economic development ===
Habib introduced a number of laws related to technology and the innovation economy. He authored the Washington Jobs Act of 2014, which allowed investor crowdfunding for the first time in Washington, so that entrepreneurs and small businesses could more easily obtain access to capital.

He authored legislation that created a statewide framework for vehicle for hire companies such as Uber and Lyft, and provided insurance minimums for drivers, passengers, and the public.

In the face of diminishing federal funding for cancer research, Habib introduced legislation to create a dedicated cancer research fund in Washington State.

=== Open government ===
Habib introduced legislation to allow the public to comment on legislative proposals by submitting video testimony filmed on a smart phone–the first such bill in the nation. Habib's bill gained national recognition when included in a PBS report as one of the "Five Times the Daily Show Actually Influenced Policy". Habib said that he was inspired by John Oliver's success in engaging the public on the topic of net neutrality, and the subsequent use of remote testimony submitted online to the Federal Communications Commission by his viewers.

Habib was also the first Democratic state legislator to seek the impeachment of State Auditor Troy Kelley, who was facing more than a dozen federal criminal charges for tax evasion and fraud.

=== Social justice ===
Habib was the prime sponsor of legislation in the State Senate to guarantee paid sick leave for nearly all Washington workers.

He was the Senate prime sponsor of the Washington Voting Rights Act, introduced and passed to prevent cities and counties from using racially polarized voting systems.

As a Senator, Habib pushed publicly for legislation to protect the rights of pregnant women in the workplace, framing it as a fundamental question of civil rights. Habib's 2015 bill to provide standard-issue ID cards to help exiting prison inmates with reentry into society gained widespread and bipartisan support.

Civil legal aid was a priority Habib fought to keep funded in the state budget. He argued that cuts in such funding will most severely impact families facing foreclosure, domestic violence, predatory lending, and those needing help accessing veteran and disability benefits.

Habib also sponsored the Truth in Evictions Reporting Act to ensure that wrongfully evicted tenants will be able to have their rental history corrected.

=== Environment and transportation ===
Habib angered some Republicans when he proposed legislative language acknowledging that climate change is real and that human activity is a significant factor in its acceleration.

As a member of the Senate Transportation Committee, Habib played a critical role in the passage of a landmark transportation investment package that completed the SR 520 bridge replacement and the North Spokane Corridor, funded extensions of SR 167 and 509, added new lanes to I-405, and authorized the next generation of light rail and bus rapid transit in the central Puget Sound region. He also authored legislation to give judges flexibility in reducing fines imposed for failure to pay bridge tolls.

== Awards and recognition ==
Habib has been recognized as the first Iranian-American elected to state office in the United States, and as the first to serve in a statewide office.

Habib has been named a Rhodes Scholar, a Truman Scholar, a Soros Fellow, and a Rodel Fellow at the Aspen Institute. He was named a Young Global Leader by the World Economic Forum.

In 2020, the Harvard Institute of Politics and the John F. Kennedy Library presented Habib with the John F. Kennedy New Frontier Award for outstanding public service.

In 2019, he was awarded the Helen Keller Achievement Award by the American Foundation for the Blind.

In 2014, Habib was named one of the "40 Under 40 Political Rising Stars" by The Washington Post. That year he had also been named one of "12 State Legislators to Watch" nationally by Governing Magazine.

In 2013, he was named a NewDEAL Leader.

== See also ==
- List of minority governors and lieutenant governors in the United States

== Additional sources ==
- Baker, Mike (March 10, 2013). "Life story drives blind lawmaker". Seattle Times.

Washington House of Representatives
| Preceded by Deborah Eddy | Member of the Washington House of Representatives from the 48th district 2013–2015 | Succeeded by Joan McBride |
Washington State Senate
| Preceded by Rodney Tom | Member of the Washington Senate from the 48th district 2015–2017 | Succeeded by Patty Kuderer |
Political offices
| Preceded by Brad Owen | Lieutenant Governor of Washington; 2017–2021 | Succeeded by Denny Heck |
