= Fancher =

Fancher is a surname. Notable people with the surname include:

- Albert T. Fancher (1859–1930), American politician
- Bruce Fancher (born 1971), American computer hacker
- Frederick B. Fancher (1852–1944), American politician
- Hampton Fancher (born 1938), American actor
- Helen Fancher (born 1931), American politician
- Houston Fancher (born 1966), American basketball coach
- Isaac A. Fancher (1833–1934), American politician and lawyer from Michigan
- Jane Fancher (born 1952), American science fiction writer
- Louis Fancher (1884–1944), American artist
- Raymond Fancher (born 1940), American psychologist and historian
