= John Smith (Washington politician) =

American politician

Member of the Washington Senate from the 7th district
- In office January 3, 2013 – November 26, 2013
- Preceded by: Bob Morton
- Succeeded by: Brian Dansel

Personal details
- Born: March 27, 1973 (age 53)
- Party: Republican
- Spouse: Dezarae D. Smith
- Profession: Farmer; Rancher; Farmers' market Owner-Operator

John Smith (born March 27, 1973) is a former American politician of the Republican Party. He was a member of the Washington State Senate from the 7th Legislative District. Smith was appointed to fill the Senate seat on January 3, 2013 following veteran Senator Bob Morton's retirement. He lost his seat in the November 5, 2013 election to Ferry County Commissioner Brian Dansel.
