= Osman Salahuddin =

American politician

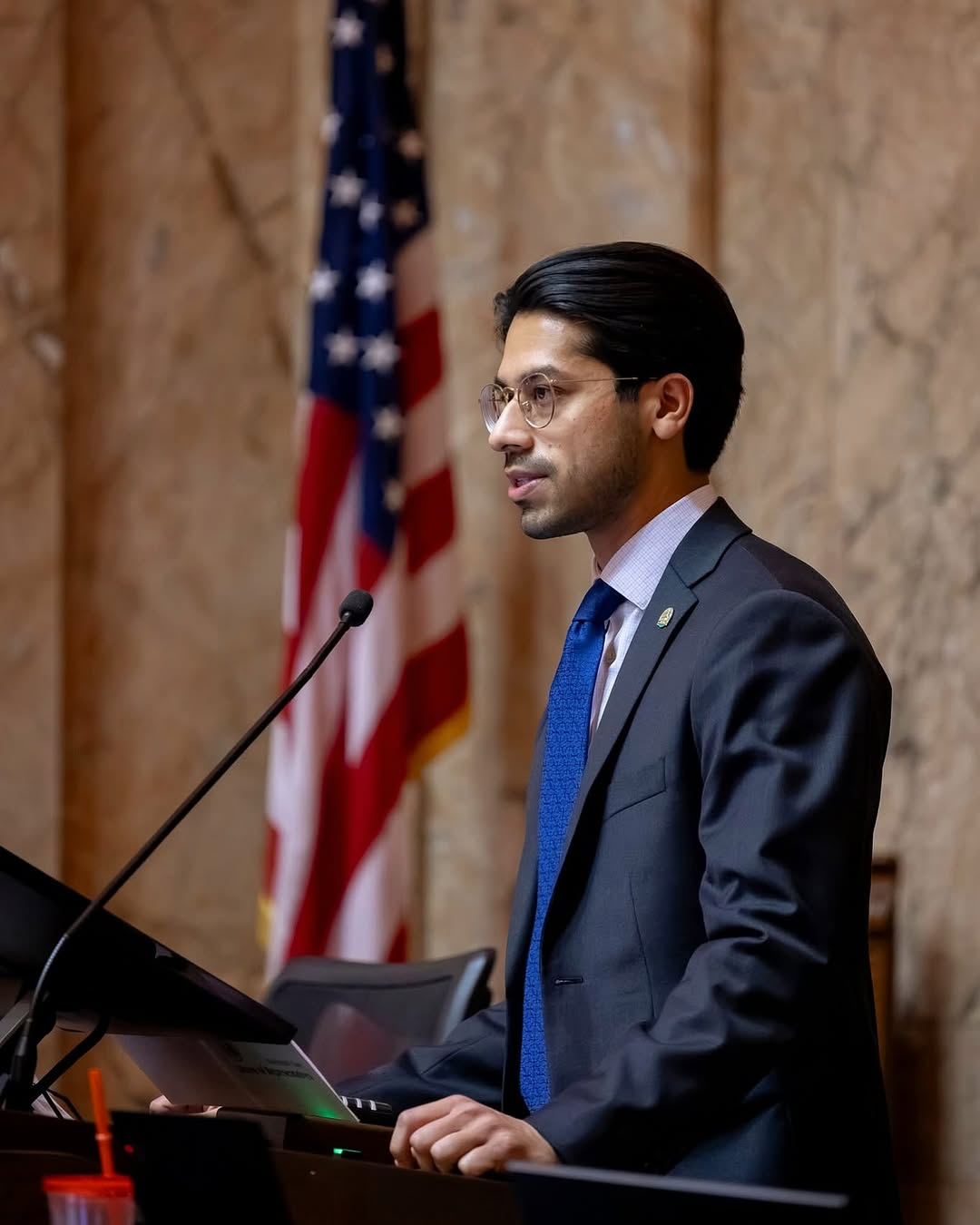

Member of the Washington House of Representatives from the 48th district
- Incumbent
- Assumed office January 7, 2025 Serving with Amy Walen
- Preceded by: Vandana Slatter

Personal details
- Born: Osman Salahuddin; February 25, 1996 (age 30) Seattle, Washington
- Party: Democratic
- Education: University of Washington

Osman Salahuddin (born 1996) is an American politician serving in the Washington House of Representatives, representing the 48th district.

== Early life and education ==
Salahuddin is from Redmond, Washington. He is the oldest of three children. His parents are immigrants from Pakistan of Sindhi ethnicity. He grew up in a multi-generational household.

He attended schools in the Lake Washington School District and graduated from International Community School in 2014. Salahuddin graduated from the University of Washington with a BS in Neurobiology and a minor in English. He served as student body president. In September 2025, Salahuddin enrolled in the University of Washington School of Law, pursuing a J.D. degree.

== Career ==
Salahuddin previously worked in management at a medical device research consulting firm, as well as research at UW Medicine and Fred Hutchinson Cancer Research Center. He works as the communications and community engagement manager for King County Councilmember Sarah Perry.

He was elected to the Redmond City Council in 2023.

On January 7, 2025, Salahuddin was appointed to the Washington House of Representatives to replace Vandana Slatter, who was appointed to fill the Senate seat vacated by Patty Kuderer.

On April 30, 2025, Salahuddin announced his campaign to retain his seat as a Washington State Representative for the 48th District. On November 4, 2025, he won the election with 68.24% of the vote, beating Republican candidate Dennis Ellis.
