= Charles H. Voss =

American politician

Charles H. Voss was a state representative and state senator in Washington. A Republican, he served in the Washington House of Representatives between 1923–1927. He succeeded Reba Hurn, Washington's first female state senator, in 1931, and remained in the Washington State Senate until 1935.
