= Fansler =

Fansler is a German-language habitational surname for someone from Vanselow, a place in Siedenbrünzow, Mecklenburg-Vorpommern. Notable people with the surname include:

- Dean Fansler (1885–19??), American academic
- Michael Fansler (1883–1963), American jurist from Indiana
- Priscilla Hiss (née Fansler, 1903–1984), American teacher
- Stan Fansler (born 1965), American baseball player
- Zach Fansler, American politician
