= Amy Walen =

American politician (born 1967)

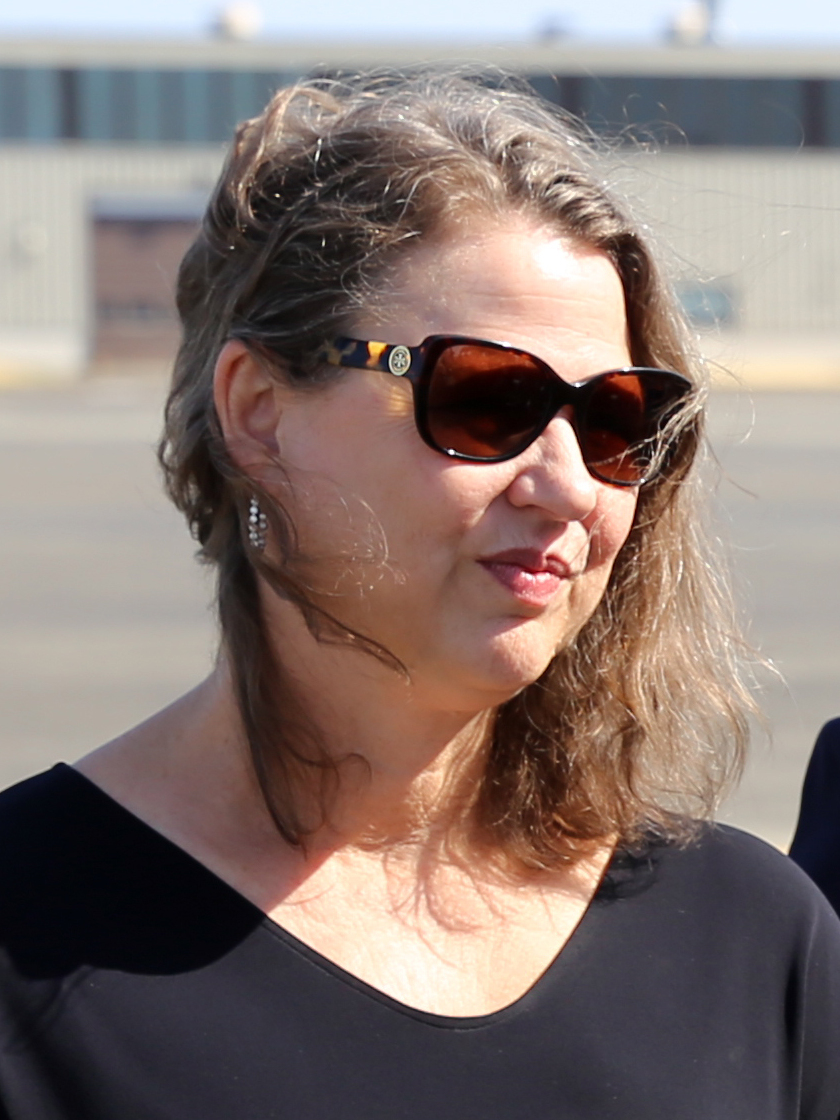
- Walen in 2024

Member of the Washington House of Representatives from the 48th district
- Incumbent
- Assumed office January 14, 2019 Serving with Osman Salahuddin
- Preceded by: Joan McBride
- Succeeded by: Jessica Forsythe (elect)

Mayor of Kirkland, Washington
- In office January 1, 2014 – January 31, 2019
- Preceded by: Joan McBride
- Succeeded by: Penny Sweet

Personal details
- Born: Amy Diane Teufel; December 26, 1967 (age 58) Portland, Oregon, U.S.
- Party: Democratic
- Spouse: Jim Walen
- Education: University of Queensland (BA, LLB)

Amy Diane Walen (née Teufel, born December 26, 1967) is an American politician who is the member of the Washington House of Representatives from the 48th district in King County.

== Political career ==
=== Election ===
Walen was elected in the general election on November 6, 2018, winning 73 percent of the vote over 27 percent of another Democratic candidate, Cindi Bright.
