= Joseph W. Arrasmith =

American politician

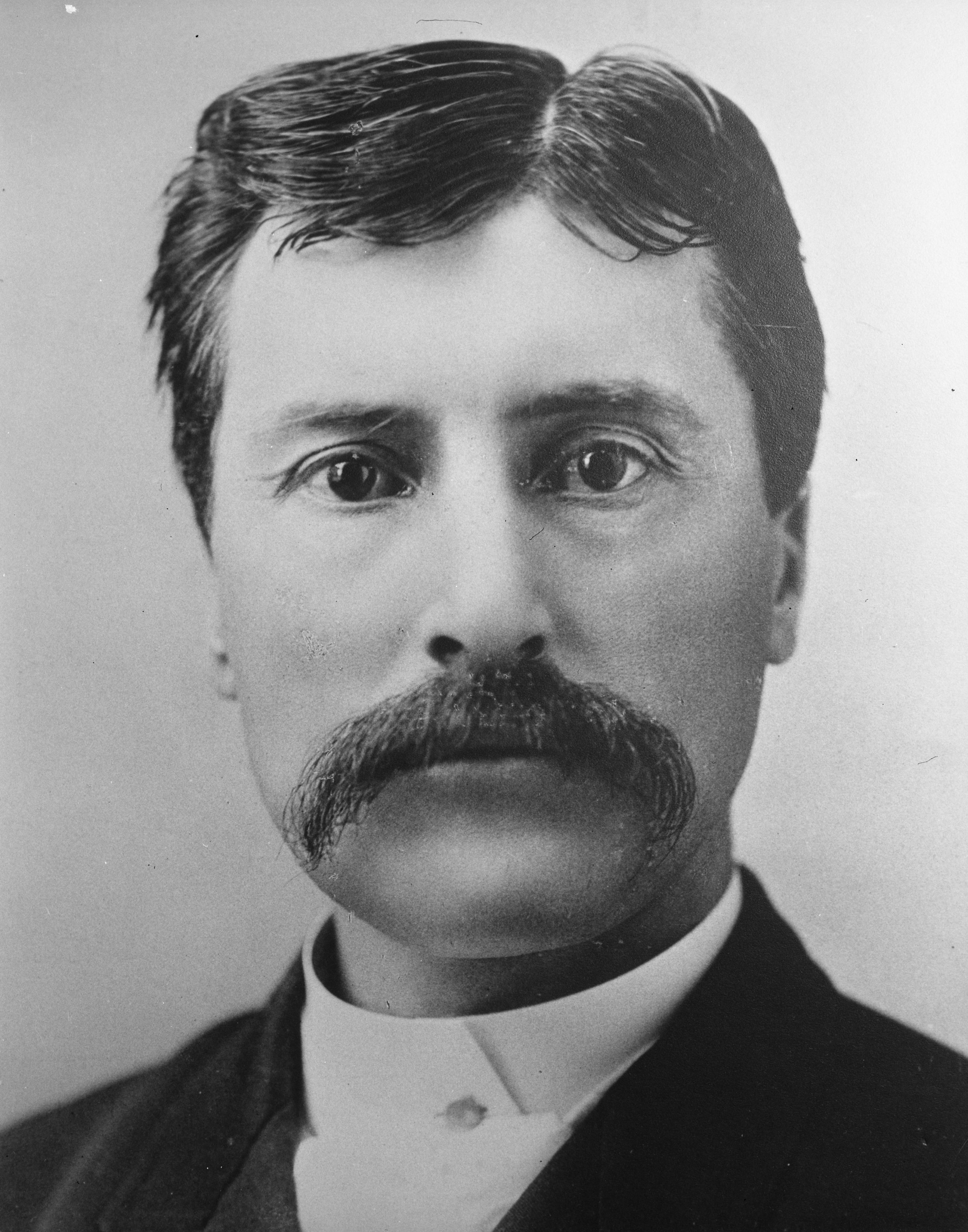
- Arrasmith in 1893

3rd Speaker of the Washington House of Representatives
- In office January 9, 1893 – January 14, 1895
- Preceded by: Amos F. Shaw
- Succeeded by: Ellis Morrison

Member of the Washington Senate from the 9th district
- In office January 11, 1909 – January 13, 1913
- Preceded by: H. M. Boone
- Succeeded by: W. C. McCoy

Member of the Washington House of Representatives from the 7th district
- In office January 7, 1891 – January 14, 1895
- Preceded by: Constituency established
- Succeeded by: Moses Bull

Personal details
- Born: August 31, 1845 Putnam County, Indiana, U.S.
- Died: December 7, 1918 (aged 73) Palouse, Washington, U.S.
- Party: Republican

Joseph W. Arrasmith (August 31, 1845 – December 7, 1918) was an American politician in the state of Washington. He served in the Washington House of Representatives from 1891 to 1893 and the Senate from 1909 to 1913. He was Speaker of the House from 1893 to 1895.
