= E. H. Guie =

American politician

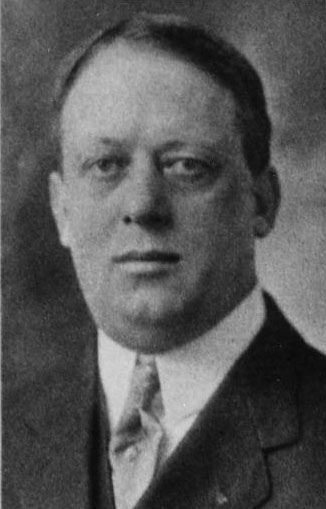
- Guie in 1917

6th and 16th Speaker of the Washington House of Representatives
- In office January 10, 1921 – January 8, 1923
- Preceded by: Fred A. Adams
- Succeeded by: Mark E. Reed
- In office January 9, 1899 – January 14, 1901
- Preceded by: Charles E. Cline
- Succeeded by: R. B. Albertson

Member of the Washington House of Representatives for the 41st district
- In office 1897–1901

Member of the Washington House of Representatives for the 47th district
- In office 1915–1925

Personal details
- Born: September 26, 1867 Pennsylvania, United States
- Died: October 28, 1931 (aged 64) Seattle, Washington, United States
- Party: Republican

Edwin Heister Guie (September 26, 1867 – October 28, 1931) was an American politician in the state of Washington. He served in the Washington House of Representatives. He served as Speaker from 1899 to 1901 and from 1921 to 1923.
