= Edward F. Harris =

American politician

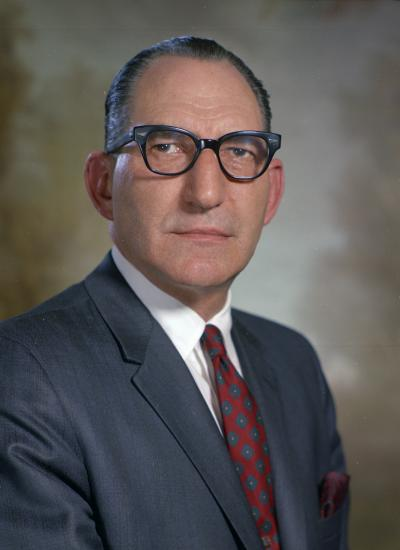
- Harris in 1967

Member of the Washington House of Representatives for the 7th district
- In office 1955–1973

Personal details
- Born: 1909 Harrison, Idaho, United States
- Died: September 19, 1983 (aged 74) Spokane, Washington
- Party: Republican

Edward F. Harris (1909 – September 19, 1983) was an American politician in the state of Washington. He served in the Washington House of Representatives.
