= Helen Fancher =

American politician

Member of the Washington House of Representatives from the 7th district
- In office 1977–1983

Personal details
- Born: March 1, 1931 (age 95) Seattle, Washington
- Party: Republican
- Education: Eastern Washington State College
- Alma mater: University of Washington

Helen Irene Fancher (born March 1, 1931) is an American politician. She was a Republican, and represented District 7 in the Washington House of Representatives which included Ferry, Lincoln, Pend Oreille, Stevens, Okanogan, Spokane counties from 1977 to 1983.
