= Susan Amini =

American judge

Judge of the King County Superior Court
- In office May 13, 2013 – May 31, 2025

Personal details
- Born: Tehran, Iran
- Spouse: Mo Habib (m. 1980; died 2016)
- Children: Cyrus Habib
- Education: University of Tehran; University of Maryland School of Law
- Profession: Judge

Susan Habib Amini is a former judge of the King County Superior Court, where she served on the bench from 2013 until her resignation effective May 31, 2025. She was appointed by Governor Jay Inslee as one of his first judicial appointments.

She is the first judge of Middle Eastern descent to serve in Washington State.

== Early life and education ==
Amini was born in Tehran, Iran, where she attended Catholic school and then obtained her undergraduate degree in political science from the University of Tehran. She has stated that she developed a passion for the U.S. legal system by watching Perry Mason episodes on television. Once she graduated from university, and as the Islamic Revolution took over Iran, Amini married Mo Habib and moved with him to Maryland. Their son, future Washington State Lieutenant Governor Cyrus Habib was born in 1981. Amini obtained her law degree from the University of Maryland School of Law, after which the family moved to Washington State.

== Career ==
Amini practiced law for twenty-three years before being appointed to the bench, first as a public defender and then, beginning in 1994, in private practice at the Amini Law Firm, where she handled family law, immigration, civil, and criminal cases. She represented clients from over fifty countries of origin.

She also served for many years as a Judge Pro Tempore in courts throughout the King County region.

=== Judicial service ===
Amini has served on the bench from 2013 to May 31, 2025, presiding over cases ranging from criminal felony trials to multi-million dollar civil disputes.

=== Notable decisions ===
In 2018, she upheld historic tenant rights legislation passed by the City of Seattle in the face of litigation brought by landlords.

In 2019, Amini ruled that one of the state's most widely used child abuse experts was unqualified, leading to a review of dozens of cases in which children had wrongfully been removed from their families.

== Personal life ==
Amini's advocacy for her son, Cyrus Habib, who became blind due to childhood cancer, often featured prominently in his political speeches and news coverage.

She and her husband, engineer and investor Mo Habib, were married in 1980. He died from cancer in 2016. In 2020, she established the Mo Habib Memorial Foundation to celebrate his life and legacy.

In 2022, the foundation entered into a partnership with the University of Washington to establish the Mo Habib Translation Prize in Persian Literature, the first such prize in the country.

Amini also sits on the board of the Seattle Symphony Orchestra and the King County Law Library, and on the St. James Cathedral Parish Finance Council.
