= Scott Barr =

American politician

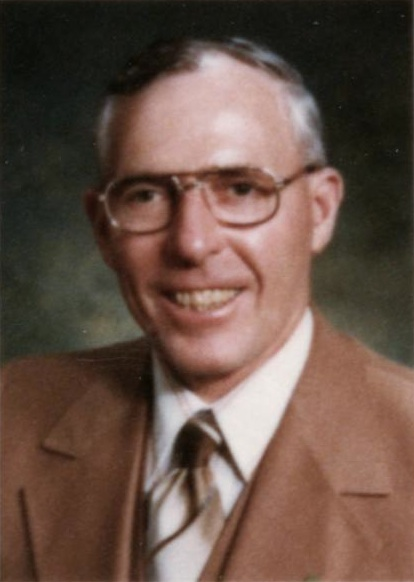
- Scott Barr in 1977

Member of the Washington House of Representatives from the 7th district
- In office 1977–1983

Member of the Washington Senate from the 7th district
- In office 1983–1993

Personal details
- Born: Harvey Scott Barr, Jr. August 21, 1916 Spokane, Washington
- Died: October 22, 2015 (aged 99) Colville, Washington
- Party: Republican
- Spouse: Dollie Mae Barr
- Occupation: Farmer, politician

Harvey Scott Barr, Jr. (August 21, 1916 – October 22, 2015) is a former American farmer and politician from Washington, U.S.

Barr was born in Spokane. He served the 7th district in the Washington House of Representatives from 1977 to 1983, and the same district from 1983 to 1993 in the Washington State Senate. The district encompassed Lincoln, Pend Oreille, Stevens, Ferry and parts of Okanogan and Spokane counties. His term ended with his resignation in December 1993. He was a Republican.

He was married to Dollie Mae and was active in farming, cattlemen, and wheat grower organizations. He was a cattle, grain and timber farmer, residing on a farm near Colville, Washington. He died in Colville, Washington on October 22, 2015.
