= Reba Hurn =

American politician (1881–1967)

Member of the Washington Senate from the 7th district
- In office 1923–1931
- Preceded by: Edwin Coman
- Succeeded by: Charles H. Voss

Personal details
- Born: August 21, 1881 Clear Lake, Iowa, U.S.
- Died: 1967 (aged 85–86)
- Party: Republican
- Education: Cornell College; Northwestern University; University of Heidelberg

Rebecca Jane "Reba" Hurn (August 21, 1881 – 1967) was a lawyer and state legislator who lived in Spokane, Washington. She was the first woman elected to the Washington State Senate, serving from 1923 to 1930. Before launching her legal and political careers, she pursued graduate work at Heidelberg University in Germany, then worked for New York philanthropist and political activist Nathan Straus, who became her mentor. Her assistance with Straus's Democratic Party activities provided Hurn with first-hand political experience long before she ran for office as a Republican in 1922. As the lone woman in the state senate, she at first attracted press attention more as a novelty than as the serious legislator that she soon became. After two terms in office, she returned to her law practice in Spokane, remained active in public affairs, and was a world traveler of unusual perception and daring.

== Early life ==
Reba Hurn was born in Clear Lake, Iowa, on August 21, 1881, the older of two sisters. Her father, David William Hurn, was a prominent lawyer, judge, banker, newspaperman and mayor of Clear Lake. Her mother's name was Grace Harriett Butts. In 1905 the family moved to Spokane, where David Hurn continued practicing law and eventually became a judge.

She attended Cornell College, Mt. Vernon, Iowa. Hurn received her undergraduate degree, A.B., in 1905 at Northwestern University in Evanston, Illinois, where she won a Phi Beta Kappa key. She taught school for a rather unhappy two years in Spokane and Ritzville. Convinced that, as a woman, teaching was the only profession open to her, she left for Germany in the summer of 1907 for graduate study at University of Heidelberg in order to enhance her chances of teaching German in Spokane.

== Finding a mentor ==
While in Heidelberg, Reba Hurn met Nathan Straus, co-owner of Macy's department store in New York City. He was in Germany to introduce his milk distribution charity, already established in American cities, whereby he provided safe, pasteurized milk to the poor. By preventing the transmission of bovine tuberculosis and other milk-borne diseases, Straus was able to reduce the shocking infant and child mortality of the period.

Reba took a keen interest in his work, began volunteering, and learned to pasteurize milk. Soon she reported in her diary: "Mr. Straus came in and was so impressed by my industry that he went home and told his wife that I am 'made of the right stuff.' " That night she mused: "Don't know what there is for me in the future, but I'll stick it out until I have learned the trade" (Arksey, Pacific Northwest Quarterly, p. 185).

At Straus's invitation, Reba Hurn abandoned her graduate studies to join this effort in New York, where she supervised a number of his milk distribution depots and observed the desperate poverty of New York's recent immigrants. In the fall of 1908, she oversaw the Nathan Straus exhibit and pasteurization demonstrations at the Sixth International Congress on Tuberculosis, held in Washington, D.C. At this conference she mingled on a collegial basis with internationally renowned scientists and leaders in public health and won press recognition for her work.

== Entering politics ==
During 1908, Straus was the New York chairman for the unsuccessful presidential campaign of Democrat William Jennings Bryan. Straus diverted Reba Hurn from some of the charity work to help with his political activities, during which she dealt with Bryan and other important figures. At one rally, she was the only woman on the platform with dignitaries.

She continued working for Straus until 1910 when she returned to Washington state to obtain a law degree, through a combination of studies at the University of Washington and private reading with her father. In 1913 Reba Hurn became one of the first women admitted to the Washington State Bar Association and began her law practice in Spokane.

== Running for office ==
In 1910, the year Reba Hurn returned home, Washington women gained the vote. Hurn was away during the most intense years of the state's suffrage campaign, and it is unclear whether she was ever a suffragist. However, as early as 1914, friends were encouraging her to run for the state legislature, though nothing came of the idea. She was ready in 1922, and stated her preference for seeking a seat in the senate, where she could serve through two sessions, gradually becoming less of a novelty: "By the close of the first session they [men in the senate] will be in the habit of taking me for granted, and by the time the second session comes around I shall have a foothold and be capable of worthwhile constructive work" (Arksey, Columbia, 35).

As it turned out, she served two terms in the senate, thus four sessions of the legislature. Unfortunately, her wish not to be considered a novelty was never totally granted, at least by the press, which often paid more attention to her dress and demeanor than to the content of her speeches.

== Senator Hurn ==
Reba Hurn was a Republic senator during a time when a vast Republican majority dominated both houses and the governor's chair. Her first term overlapped with the last session of Governor Louis F. Hart's tenure, and she supported his efforts to simplify state government and reduce expenditures. During her remaining years in the senate, arch-conservative Roland Hartley was governor. She supported some of his positions but opposed him on others. Like him, she was a fiscal conservative and was considered one of the more relentless cost cutters in the senate, even opposing requested University of Washington appropriations. Yet she defied Governor Hartley to support a proposed constitutional amendment against child labor and to introduce legislation enabling local zoning restrictions. She proposed stricter controls on lobbyists and fought for tax relief and other assistance to beleaguered Eastern Washington farmers. She even was an early advocate for a state income tax.

However, the issue with which she most identified was Prohibition, and throughout her legislative career, she defended Washington's "bone dry law." Her final major cause, and the one which defeated her attempt at a third term, was elimination of the wasteful and inefficient "township" system of county government, dear to the hearts of her rural constituents in Spokane County.

== Memberships ==
- Phi Beta Kappa (Northwestern University)
- Phi Delta Delta (woman's law fraternity)
- American Association of University Women
- Spokane Young Women's Christian Association

== Lawyer and traveler ==
With her defeat in 1930, Reba Hurn returned to Spokane and her law practice. She remained active in public affairs, and her opinions were often quoted in the newspapers. As she had done throughout her life, she left home for long trips to various parts of the world. More of an adventurer than a tourist, she would often be gone for a year or more, traveling alone and lodging in private homes instead of hotels, getting to know the people and their way of life.

Her favorite destination was the Middle East, to which she returned repeatedly. Perhaps her most significant trip was a two-year journey, 1946–1948, from Egypt to Iraq, with long stays in Lebanon and Jordan. She was in the region during the partition of Palestine establishing the state of Israel and the unrest that followed. Reba Hurn's unpublished memoirs of this trip contain observations on Middle Eastern events and attitudes that seem eerily relevant to present problems. Her world travels continued almost until her death in 1967 at age 86.

== Sources ==
This article is primarily based on which has a creative commons licensing.

Listed sources there are: Laura Arksey, "Dutiful Daughter to Independent Woman: The Diaries of Reba Hurn, 1907–1908," Pacific Northwest Quarterly Vol. 95, No. 4 (Fall 2004), 182–193; Laura Arksey, "A Lady in the Senate: The Political Career of Reba Hurn," Columbia Vol. 19, No. 3 (Fall 2005), 34–41; Reba Hurn, "From Aswan to the Caspian and Bosporus," typescript dated 1946–1948, ReSC 471, Northwest Museum of Arts and Culture, Spokane; Julie Miller, "To Stop the Slaughter of the Babies: Nathan Straus and the Drive for Pasteurized Milk, 1893–1920," New York History, Vol. 74, No. 2 (April 1993), 159–184. The Reba Hurn Diaries (1907–1908) may be found at the Northwest Museum Museum of Arts and Culture (MsSc), Spokane.

== See also ==
- List of first women lawyers and judges in Washington
