= W. S. Johnston =

American politician

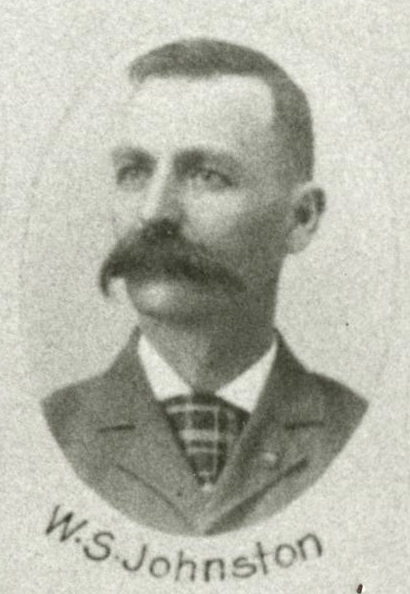
- Johnston in 1895

Member of the Washington House of Representatives for the 7th district
- In office 1893–1897

Personal details
- Born: October 1, 1847 Guelph, Canada West (present-day Ontario)
- Died: November 24, 1931 (aged 84) Sunnyside, Washington, United States
- Party: Republican

William Samuel Johnston (October 1, 1847 – November 24, 1931) was an American politician who served in the Washington House of Representatives from 1895 to 1897, alongside Moses Bull.
