= Drumheller Fountain =

Fountain in Seattle, Washington, U.S.

Coordinates: 47.653817°N 122.307814°W

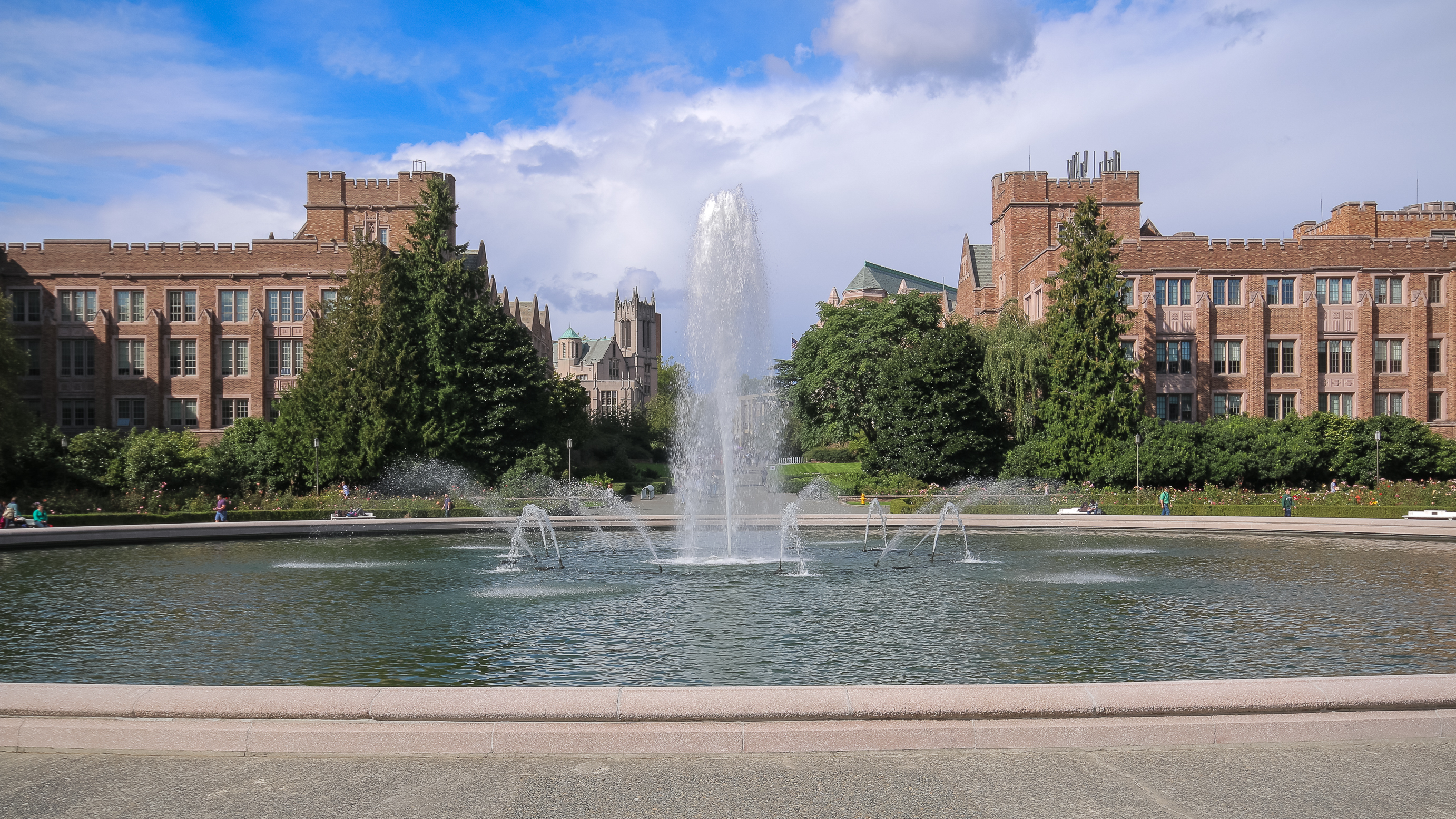
- Interactive map of Drumheller Fountain
- Location: Seattle, Washington

Drumheller Fountain is an outdoor fountain on the University of Washington campus in Seattle, Washington, in the United States. The fountain was given its name in 1961 to honor the University Regent Joseph Drumheller, who gifted the central fountain machinery to the University for its centennial celebration.

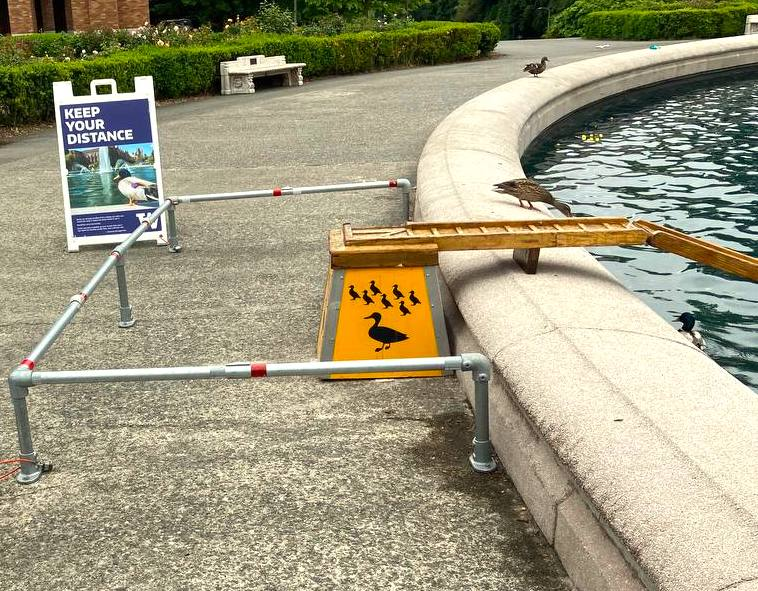
A duck ramp, built for the spring of 2021, attached to Drumheller Fountain.

Since the early 1900s, the fountain has been nicknamed "Frosh Pond" due to its association with pranks, particularly those targeting innocent freshmen. The tradition originated in 1909 when a group of sophomores dunked freshmen in the water of the fountain, leading to an initiation ritual each fall. Over the years, not only freshmen, but also ROTC recruits, sailors, divers, and people engaging in (unauthorized) winter swimming have found themselves in the pond. Additionally, non-human items ranging from rainbow trouts to a Domino's delivery truck have also made appearances in the fountain.

The fountain is utilized by mallards to raise ducklings, and every spring, the university would install a duck ramp to help ducklings enter and leave the raised edges of the fountain. Installed typically in April or May and maintained for approximately a month, the ramp allows sufficient time for the young ducklings to develop their flying skills and venture out of the pond. The duck ramp comes after the university's unsuccessful attempts to remove the ducklings and the repeated arrival of additional ducks.

On February 6, 2019, a University of Washington student suffered a head injury after falling near the fountain after a campus snowstorm and later died of a blood clot in her lung. Although the cause of the student's death was later determined to be unrelated to the fall, the incident sparked backlash on social media directed at the university's president, Ana Mari Cauce, regarding the condition of the campus sidewalks during inclement weather.

== Geyser Basin ==
Drumheller Fountain is predated by a pond similar in design and location known as Geyser Basin, which was built for the 1909 Alaska-Yukon-Pacific Exposition. During the fair, the fountain was the centerpiece of a formal garden extending onto the Rainier Vista, adorned with a geometric layout, roses enclosed by Japanese barberry, and a carpet of 80,000 English daisies.

While the design and location are similar, Geyser Basin was a distinct structure from the current-day Drumheller Fountain. The modern Drumheller Fountain simply consists of a stone bowl, whereas Geyser Basin was a much larger structure that featured cascading water emptying into the pond.

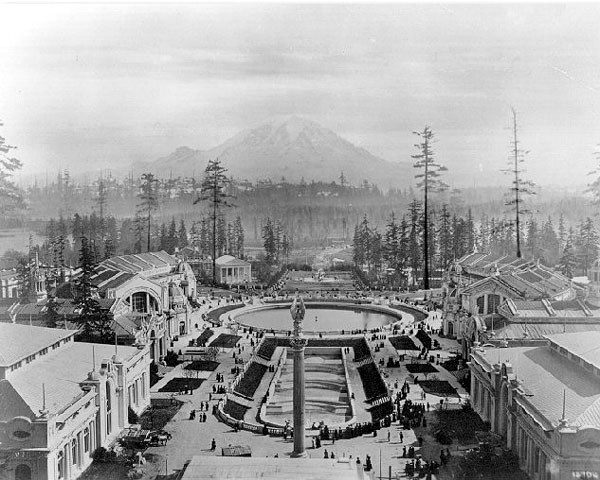
Alaska-Yukon-Pacific Exposition on the UW campus toward Mount Rainier in 1909, Geyser Basin at center

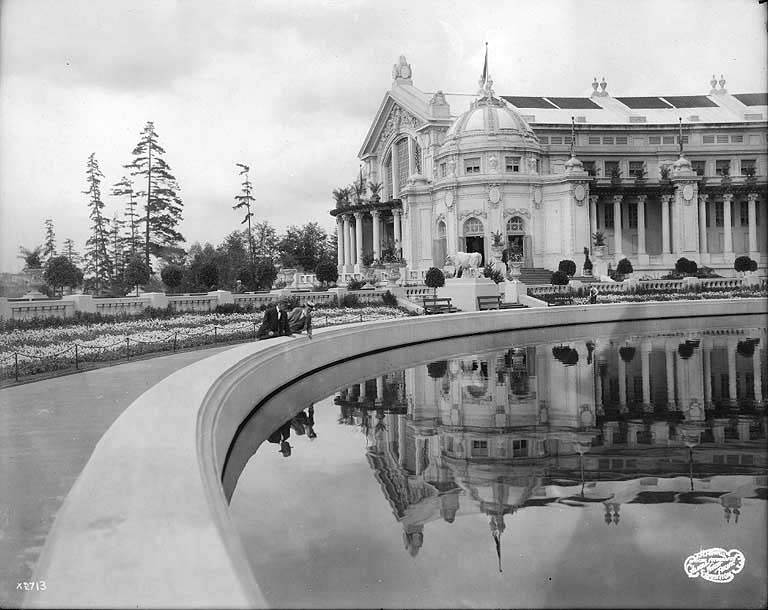
Geyser Basin and Agriculture Building at AYP Exposition

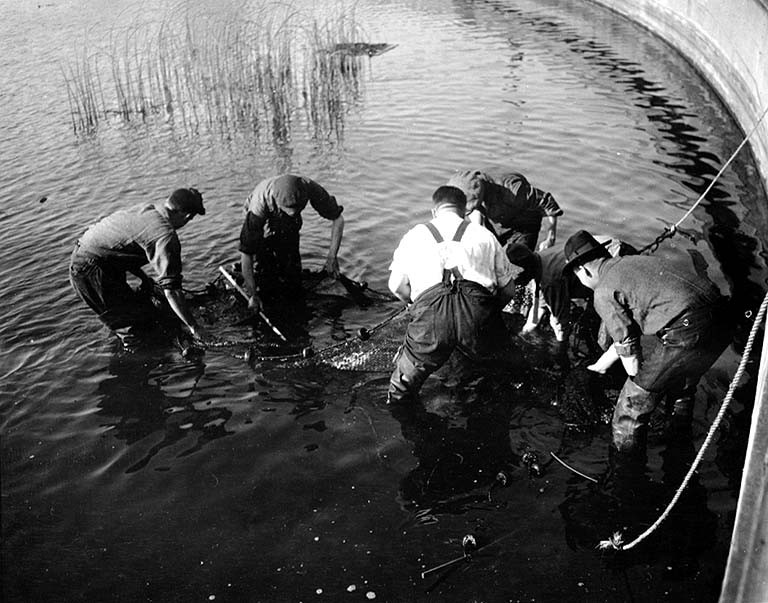
College of Fisheries students practice seining in Geyser Basin, 1921

== See also ==
- Campus of the University of Washington
