= David C. Cowen =

American politician

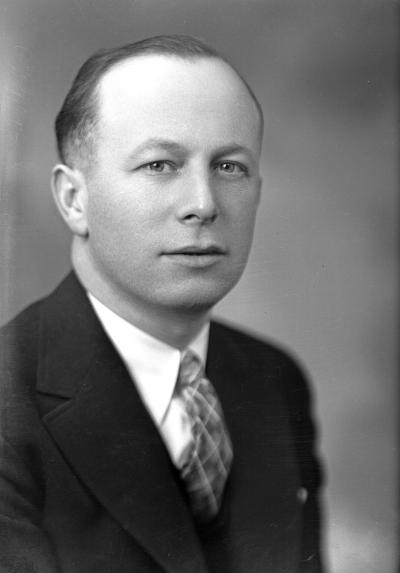
- Cowen in 1935

Member of the Washington House of Representatives for the 7th district
- In office 1935–1943

Member of the Washington State Senate for the 7th district
- In office 1943–1967

Personal details
- Born: June 12, 1897 Portland, Oregon, United States
- Died: May 1, 1975 (aged 77) Spokane, Washington, United States
- Party: Democratic
- Occupation: dentist

David Charles Cowen (June 12, 1897 – May 1, 1975) was an American politician in the state of Washington. He served in the Washington House of Representatives from 1935 to 1943, and the Washington State Senate from 1943 to 1967.

He died of heart disease in 1975.
