= Washington's 48th legislative district =

American legislative district

Coordinates: 47°39′N 122°9′W

Map of Washington's 48th legislative district

Washington's 48th legislative district is one of forty-nine districts in Washington state for representation in the state legislature. It covers areas of Redmond, Bellevue (including West Lake Sammamish), and Kirkland, and it encompasses Clyde Hill, Yarrow Point, Hunts Point, and Medina. It also contains Bridle Trails State Park and Marymoor Park.

The district's legislators are state senator Vandana Slatter and state representatives Osman Salahuddin (position 1) and Amy Walen (position 2), all Democrats.

== See also ==
- Washington Redistricting Commission
- Washington State Senate
- Washington House of Representatives
- Washington (state) legislative districts
