= 2022 Washington House of Representatives election =

2022 Washington House of Representatives elections
- November 8, 2022

All 98 seats in the Washington House of Representatives 50 seats needed for a majority
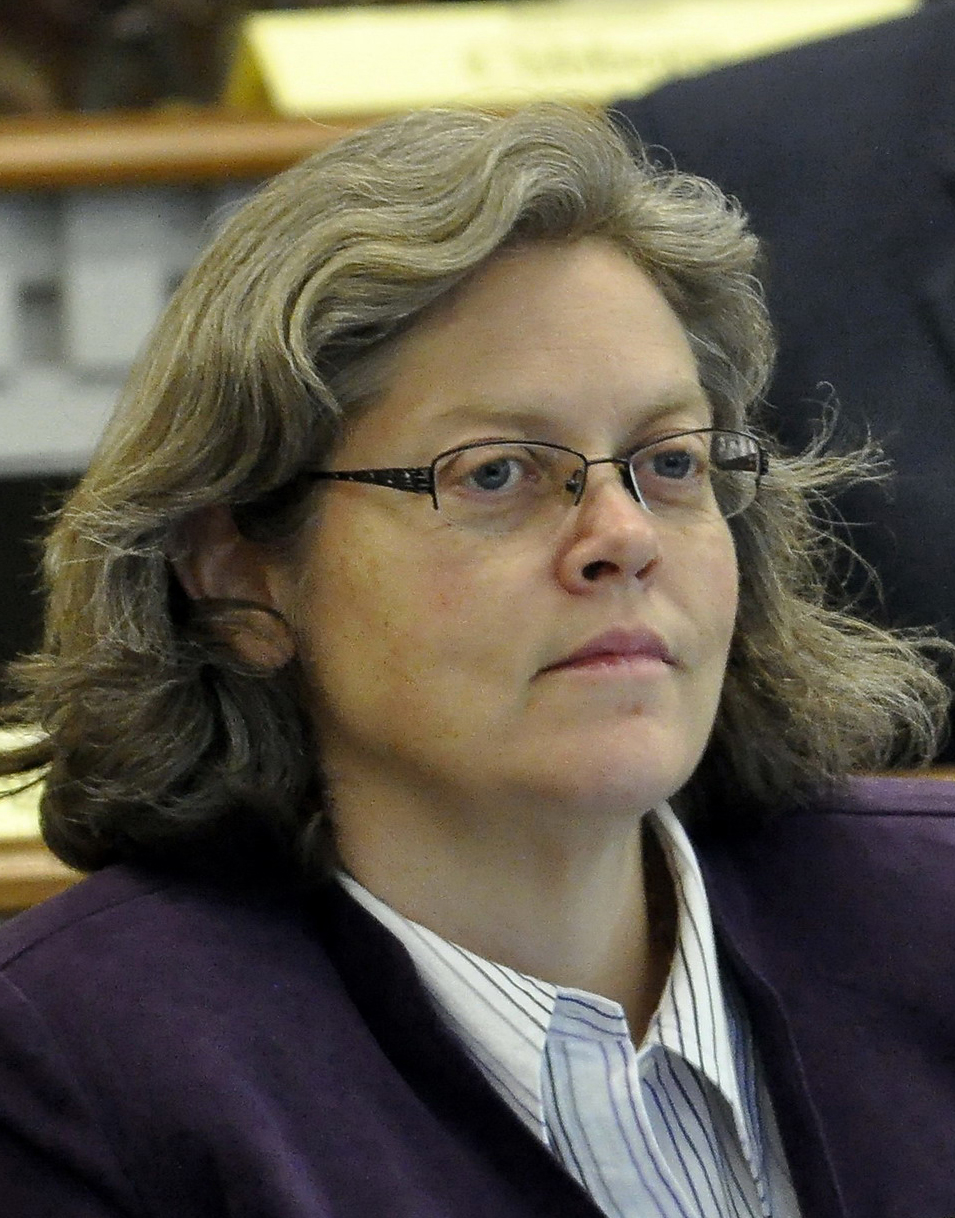

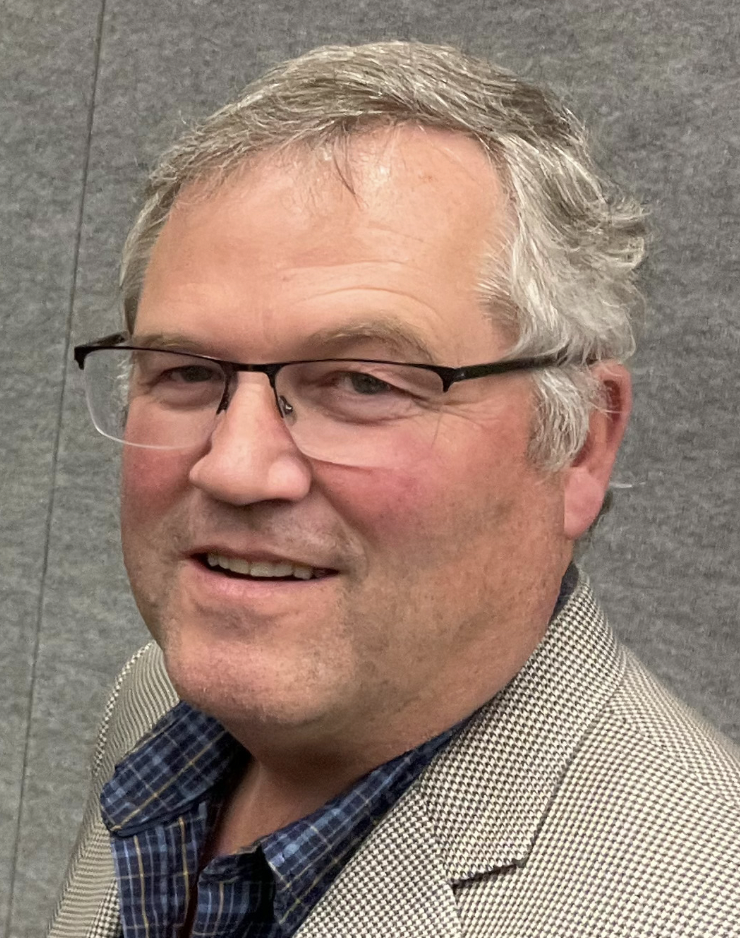
	Majority party	Minority party
Leader	Laurie Jinkins	J. T. Wilcox (retired as leader)
Party	Democratic	Republican
Leader's seat	27th-Tacoma	2nd-Roy
Last election	57	41
Seats won	58	40
Seat change	▲1	▼1
Popular vote	2,937,173	2,581,809
Percentage	52.07%	45.77%
Swing	▼3.98%	▲3.81%
- Results: Democratic gain Democratic hold Republican hold
Speaker of the House before election
Laurie Jinkins
Democratic
Elected Speaker of the House
Laurie Jinkins
Democratic

The 2022 Washington House of Representatives elections took place as part of the biennial United States elections on November 8, 2022. Washington state voters elected state representatives in all 98 seats of the House, electing two state representatives in each of the 49 Washington state legislative districts. State representatives serve two-year terms in the Washington House of Representatives.

Following the previous election in 2020, Democrats held a 57-to-41-seat majority over Republicans.

There was only one district, the 10th, whose two representatives were from different parties before the election. The flipping of the 10th district seat held by Republican Greg Gilday to the Democrats means that there were no split districts for the first time since Washington gained statehood in 1889. (Note: Prior to 1965, there were some single-member legislative districts, but of the multi-member districts there were always split-party districts.)

== Retirements ==
=== Democrats ===
- Eileen Cody
- Laurie Dolan
- Noel Frame
- Kirsten Harris-Talley
- Steve Kirby
- Jesse Johnson
- Mike Sells
- Sharon Shewmake
- Pat Sullivan
- Javier Valdez
- Emily Wicks

=== Republicans ===
- Matt Boehnke
- Jeremie Dufault
- Larry Hoff
- Brad Klippert
- Vicki Kraft
- Drew MacEwen
- Bob McCaslin Jr.
- Jesse Young

== Predictions ==
Source	Ranking	As of
Sabato's Crystal Ball	Safe D	May 19, 2022

== Overview ==
Washington State House Elections, 2022 Primary election — August 2, 2022
Party	Votes	Percentage	Candidates	Advancing to general	Seats contesting
Democratic	1,820,360	62.34	104	82	77
Republican	1,056,460	36.18	119	86	83
Write-in candidates	16,779	0.57	3	2	3
Election Integerity	16,429	0.56	3	2	3
Independent	5,788	0.20	9	3	8
Forward	1,572	0.05	1	0	1
Peace and Freedom	1,242	0.04	1	0	1
Libertarian	1,004	0.03	1	0	1
Alliance	752	0.03	1	0	1
Totals	2,920,386	100.00	239	173	175

Washington State House Elections, 2022 General election — November 8, 2022
Party	Votes	Percentage	Seats	+/–
Democratic	2,937,173	52.07	58	▲1
Republican	2,581,809	45.77	40	▼1
Write-in candidates	51,881	0.92	0	Steady
Independent	44,434	0.79	0	Steady
Election Integerity	25,741	0.46	0	Steady
Totals	5,641,038	100.0	98	—

== Summary of results by House district ==
** Incumbent did not seek re-election.

House district	Position	Incumbent	Party	Elected Representative	Party
1st	1	Davina Duerr	Dem	Davina Duerr	Dem
1st	2	Shelley Kloba	Dem	Shelley Kloba	Dem
2nd	1	Andrew Barkis	Rep	Andrew Barkis	Rep
2nd	2	J.T. Wilcox	Rep	J.T. Wilcox	Rep
3rd	1	Marcus Riccelli	Dem	Marcus Riccelli	Dem
3rd	2	Timm Ormsby	Dem	Timm Ormsby	Dem
4th	1	**Bob McCaslin Jr.	Rep	Suzanne Schmidt	Rep
4th	2	Rob Chase	Rep	Leonard Christian	Rep
5th	1	Bill Ramos	Dem	Bill Ramos	Dem
5th	2	Lisa Callan	Dem	Lisa Callan	Dem
6th	1	Mike Volz	Rep	Mike Volz	Rep
6th	2	Jenny Graham	Rep	Jenny Graham	Rep
7th	1	Jacquelin Maycumber	Rep	Jacquelin Maycumber	Rep
7th	2	Joel Kretz	Rep	Joel Kretz	Rep
8th	1	**Brad Klippert	Rep	Stephanie Barnard	Rep
8th	2	**Matt Boehnke	Rep	April Connors	Rep
9th	1	Mary Dye	Rep	Mary Dye	Rep
9th	2	Joe Schmick	Rep	Joe Schmick	Rep
10th	1	Greg Gilday	Rep	Clyde Shavers	Dem
10th	2	Dave Paul	Dem	Dave Paul	Dem
11th	1	David Hackney	Dem	David Hackney	Dem
11th	2	Steve Bergquist	Dem	Steve Bergquist	Dem
12th	1	Keith Goehner	Rep	Keith Goehner	Rep
12th	2	Mike Steele	Rep	Mike Steele	Rep
13th	1	Tom Dent	Rep	Tom Dent	Rep
13th	2	Alex Ybarra	Rep	Alex Ybarra	Rep
14th	1	Chris Corry	Rep	Chris Corry	Rep
14th	2	Gina Mosbrucker	Rep	Gina Mosbrucker	Rep
15th	1	Bruce Chandler	Rep	Bruce Chandler	Rep
15th	2	**Jeremie Dufault	Rep	Bryan Sandlin	Rep
16th	1	Mark Klicker	Rep	Mark Klicker	Rep
16th	2	Skyler Rude	Rep	Skyler Rude	Rep
17th	1	**Vicki Kraft	Rep	Kevin Waters	Rep
17th	2	Paul Harris	Rep	Paul Harris	Rep
18th	1	Brandon Vick	Rep	Stephanie McClintock	Rep
18th	2	**Larry Hoff	Rep	Greg Cheney	Rep
19th	1	Jim Walsh	Rep	Jim Walsh	Rep
19th	2	Joel McEntire	Rep	Joel McEntire	Rep
20th	1	Peter Abbarno	Rep	Peter Abbarno	Rep
20th	2	Ed Orcutt	Rep	Ed Orcutt	Rep
21st	1	Strom Peterson	Dem	Strom Peterson	Dem
21st	2	Lillian Ortiz-Self	Dem	Lillian Ortiz-Self	Dem
22nd	1	**Laurie Dolan	Dem	Beth Doglio	Dem
22nd	2	Jessica Bateman	Dem	Jessica Bateman	Dem
23rd	1	Tarra Simmons	Dem	Tarra Simmons	Dem
23rd	2	Drew Hansen	Dem	Drew Hansen	Dem
24th	1	Mike Chapman	Dem	Mike Chapman	Dem
24th	2	Steve Tharinger	Dem	Steve Tharinger	Dem
25th	1	Kelly Chambers	Rep	Kelly Chambers	Rep
25th	2	Cyndy Jacobsen	Rep	Cyndy Jacobsen	Rep
26th	1	**Jesse Young	Rep	Spencer Hutchins	Rep
26th	2	Michelle Caldier	Rep	Michelle Caldier	Rep
27th	1	Laurie Jinkins	Dem	Laurie Jinkins	Dem
27th	2	Jake Fey	Dem	Jake Fey	Dem
28th	1	Mari Leavitt	Dem	Mari Leavitt	Dem
28th	2	Dan Bronoske	Dem	Dan Bronoske	Dem
29th	1	**Steve Kirby	Dem	Melanie Morgan	Dem
29th	2	Sharlett Mena	Dem	Sharlett Mena	Dem
30th	1	Jamila Taylor	Dem	Jamila Taylor	Dem
30th	2	**Jesse Johnson	Dem	Kristine Reeves	Dem
31st	1	Drew Stokesbary	Rep	Drew Stokesbary	Rep
31st	2	Eric Robertson	Rep	Eric Robertson	Rep
32nd	1	Cindy Ryu	Dem	Cindy Ryu	Dem
32nd	2	Lauren Davis	Dem	Lauren Davis	Dem
33rd	1	Tina Orwall	Dem	Tina Orwall	Dem
33rd	2	Mia Gregerson	Dem	Mia Gregerson	Dem
34th	1	**Eileen Cody	Dem	Emily Alvarado	Dem
34th	2	Joe Fitzgibbon	Dem	Joe Fitzgibbon	Dem
35th	1	Dan Griffey	Rep	Dan Griffey	Rep
35th	2	**Drew C. MacEwen	Rep	Travis Couture	Rep
36th	1	**Noel Frame	Dem	Julia Reed	Dem
36th	2	Liz Berry	Dem	Liz Berry	Dem
37th	1	Sharon Tomiko Santos	Dem	Sharon Tomiko Santos	Dem
37th	2	**Kirsten Harris-Talley	Dem	Chipalo Street	Dem
38th	1	**Emily Wicks	Dem	Julio Cortes	Dem
38th	2	**Mike Sells	Dem	Mary Fosse	Dem
39th	1	Robert Sutherland	Rep	Sam Low	Rep
39th	2	Carolyn Eslick	Rep	Carolyn Eslick	Rep
40th	1	Debra Lekanoff	Dem	Debra Lekanoff	Dem
40th	2	Alex Ramel	Dem	Alex Ramel	Dem
41st	1	Tana Senn	Dem	Tana Senn	Dem
41st	2	My-Linh Thai	Dem	My-Linh Thai	Dem
42nd	1	Alicia Rule	Dem	Alicia Rule	Dem
42nd	2	**Sharon Shewmake	Dem	Joe Timmons	Dem
43rd	1	Nicole Macri	Dem	Nicole Macri	Dem
43rd	2	Frank Chopp	Dem	Frank Chopp	Dem
44th	1	Brandy Donaghy	Dem	Brandy Donaghy	Dem
44th	2	April Berg	Dem	April Berg	Dem
45th	1	Roger Goodman	Dem	Roger Goodman	Dem
45th	2	Larry Springer	Dem	Larry Springer	Dem
46th	1	Gerry Pollet	Dem	Gerry Pollet	Dem
46th	2	**Javier Valdez	Dem	Darya Farivar	Dem
47th	1	Debra Entenman	Dem	Debra Entenman	Dem
47th	2	**Pat Sullivan	Dem	Chris Stearns	Dem
48th	1	Vandana Slatter	Dem	Vandana Slatter	Dem
48th	2	Amy Walen	Dem	Amy Walen	Dem
49th	1	Sharon Wylie	Dem	Sharon Wylie	Dem
49th	2	Monica Jurado Stonier	Dem	Monica Jurado Stonier	Dem

== Detailed results by House district ==
- Note: Washington uses a top two primary system. The vote totals may include write-in candidates. Official primary results can be obtained here:

=== District 1 ===
1st House District Position 1 election, 2022
Primary election
Party	Candidate	Votes	%
Democratic	Davina Duerr (incumbent)	28,386	70.97
Republican	John Peeples	11,560	28.90
Write-in		52	0.13
Total votes		39,998	100.0
General election
Democratic	Davina Duerr (incumbent)	48,043	70.82
Republican	John Peeples	19,740	29.10
Write-in		58	0.09
Total votes		67,841	100.0

1st House District Position 2 election, 2022
Primary election
Party	Candidate	Votes	%
Democratic	Shelley Kloba (incumbent)	28,574	71.37
Republican	Jerry Buccola	11,386	28.44
Write-in		77	0.19
Total votes		40,037	100.0
General election
Democratic	Shelley Kloba (incumbent)	48,198	71.19
Republican	Jerry Buccola	19,443	28.72
Write-in		67	0.10
Total votes		67,708	100.0

=== District 2 ===
2nd House District Position 1 election, 2022
Primary election
Party	Candidate	Votes	%
Republican	Andrew Barkis (incumbent)	23,099	91.83
Write-in		2,054	8.17
Total votes		25,153	100.0
General election
Republican	Andrew Barkis (incumbent)	41,291	93.21
Write-in		3,009	6.79
Total votes		44,300	100.0

2nd House District Position 2 election, 2022
Primary election
Party	Candidate	Votes	%
Republican	JT Wilcox (incumbent)	21,893	73.60
No party preference	Edward Meer	7,084	23.81
Write-in		769	2.59
Total votes		29,746	100.0
General election
Republican	JT Wilcox (incumbent)	38,535	72.45
No party preference	Edward Meer	13,634	25.63
Write-in		1,022	1.92
Total votes		53,191	100.0

=== District 3 ===
3rd House District Position 1 election, 2022
Primary election
Party	Candidate	Votes	%
Democratic	Marcus Riccelli (incumbent)	25,199	64.16
Republican	Scotty Nicol	14,022	35.7
Write-in		55	0.14
Total votes		39,276	100.0
General election
Democratic	Marcus Riccelli (incumbent)	37,708	62.40
Republican	Scotty Nicol	22,665	37.50
Write-in		61	0.10
Total votes		60,434	100.0

3rd House District Position 2 election, 2022
Primary election
Party	Candidate	Votes	%
Democratic	Timm Ormsby (incumbent)	23,789	60.47
Republican	Natalie Poulson	14,705	37.38
No party preference	Patrick K. Spurlock	819	2.08
Write-in		29	0.07
Total votes		39,342	100.0
General election
Democratic	Timm Ormsby (incumbent)	36,170	59.78
Republican	Natalie Poulson	24,289	40.15
Write-in		44	0.07
Total votes		60,503	100.0

=== District 4 ===
4th House District Position 1 election, 2022
Primary election
Party	Candidate	Votes	%
Democratic	Ted Cummings	15,003	36.5
Republican	Suzanne Schmidt	14,754	35.89
Republican	MJ Bolt	11,272	27.42
Write-in		78	0.19
Total votes		41,107	100.0
General election
Republican	Suzanne Schmidt	41,275	63.34
Democratic	Ted Cummings	23,797	36.52
Write-in		91	0.14
Total votes		65,163	100.0

4th House District Position 2 election, 2022
Primary election
Party	Candidate	Votes	%
Republican	Rob Chase (incumbent)	17,616	50.09
Republican	Leonard Christian	16,327	46.42
Write-in		1,229	3.49
Total votes		35,172	100.0
General election
Republican	Leonard Christian	29,077	50.07
Republican	Rob Chase (incumbent)	27,748	47.79
Write-in		1,243	2.14
Total votes		58,068	100.0

=== District 5 ===
5th House District Position 1 election, 2022
Primary election
Party	Candidate	Votes	%
Democratic	Bill Ramos (incumbent)	25,231	58.22
Republican	Ken Moninski	12,539	28.94
Republican	Landon Halverson	5,125	11.83
Elven Way	Austin Bryant (Note: Listed on ballot as "Prefers The Elven Way Party.")	396	0.91
Write-in		44	0.1
Total votes		43,335	100.0
General election
Democratic	Bill Ramos (incumbent)	41,825	59.39
Republican	Ken Moninski	28,527	40.51
Write-in		60	0.10
Total votes		70,420	100.0

5th House District Position 2 election, 2022
Primary election
Party	Candidate	Votes	%
Democratic	Lisa Callan (incumbent)	23,898	55.3
Republican	Chad Magendanz	19,250	44.54
Write-in		70	0.16
Total votes		43,218	100.0
General election
Democratic	Lisa Callan (incumbent)	38,030	53.84
Republican	Chad Magendanz	32,528	46.05
Write-in		73	0.10
Total votes		70,631	100.0

=== District 6 ===
6th House District Position 1 election, 2022
Primary election
Party	Candidate	Votes	%
Republican	Mike Volz (incumbent)	26,366	94.08
Write-in		1,658	5.92
Total votes		28,024	100.0
General election
Republican	Mike Volz (incumbent)	41,765	94.55
Write-in		2,408	5.45
Total votes		44,173	100.0

6th House District Position 2 election, 2022
Primary election
Party	Candidate	Votes	%
Republican	Jenny Graham (incumbent)	23,194	61.04
Democratic	Michaela Kelso	14,678	38.63
Write-in		123	0.32
Total votes		37,995	100.0
General election
Republican	Jenny Graham (incumbent)	36,580	61.64
Democratic	Michaela Kelso	22,673	38.21
Write-in		88	0.15
Total votes		59,341	100.0

=== District 7 ===
7th House District Position 1 election, 2022
Primary election
Party	Candidate	Votes	%
Republican	Jacquelin Maycumber (incumbent)	27,445	70.68
Republican	Lonny Ray Williams	10,433	26.87
Write-in		951	2.45
Total votes		38,829	100.0
General election
Republican	Jacquelin Maycumber (incumbent)	42,611	72.76
Republican	Lonny Ray Williams	14,771	25.22
Write-in		1,180	2.01
Total votes		58,562	100.0

7th House District Position 2 election, 2022
Primary election
Party	Candidate	Votes	%
Republican	Joel Kretz (incumbent)	33,519	96.67
Write-in		1,155	3.33
Total votes		34,674	100.0
General election
Republican	Joel Kretz (incumbent)	51,074	97.08
Write-in		1,534	2.92
Total votes		52,608	100.0

=== District 8 ===
8th House District Position 1 election, 2022
Primary election
Party	Candidate	Votes	%
Republican	Stephanie Barnard	22,080	69.48
Republican	Patrick Guettner	6,807	21.42
Republican	Glenn Taylor	2,093	6.59
Write-in		798	2.51
Total votes		31,778	100.0
General election
Republican	Stephanie Barnard	37,729	72.92
Republican	Patrick Guettner	13,015	25.16
Write-in		995	1.92
Total votes		51,739	100.0

8th House District Position 2 election, 2022
Primary election
Party	Candidate	Votes	%
Republican	April Connors	12,715	34.17
Republican	Joe Cotta	12,235	32.88
Democratic	John Christenson	11,445	30.76
Alliance	Larry Stanley	752	2.02
Write-in		66	0.18
Total votes		37,213	100.0
General election
Republican	April Connors	29,176	55.00
Republican	Joe Cotta	22,880	43.13
Write-in		993	1.87
Total votes		53,049	100.0

=== District 9 ===
9th House District Position 1 election, 2022
Primary election
Party	Candidate	Votes	%
Republican	Mary Dye (incumbent)	30,577	95.17
Write-in		1,553	4.83
Total votes		32,130	100.0
General election
Republican	Mary Dye (incumbent)	46,711	95.65
Write-in		2,124	4.35
Total votes		48,835	100.0

9th House District Position 2 election, 2022
Primary election
Party	Candidate	Votes	%
Republican	Joe Schmick (incumbent) (Note: Listed on ballot as "Prefers GOP Party.")	29,566	95.19
Write-in		1,494	4.81
Total votes		31,060	100.0
General election
Republican	Joe Schmick (incumbent)	45,320	95.51
Write-in		2,133	4.49
Total votes		47,453	100.0

=== District 10 ===
10th House District Position 1 election, 2022
Primary election
Party	Candidate	Votes	%
Democratic	Clyde Shavers	26,165	51.91
Republican	Greg Gilday (incumbent)	24,165	47.94
Write-in		78	0.15
Total votes		50,408	100.0
General election
Democratic	Clyde Shavers	37,375	50.07
Republican	Greg Gilday (incumbent)	37,164	49.79
Write-in		104	0.14
Total votes		74,643	100.0

10th House District Position 2 election, 2022
Primary election
Party	Candidate	Votes	%
Democratic	Dave Paul (incumbent)	27,619	54.24
Republican	Karen Lesetmoe	23,242	45.64
Write-in		59	0.12
Total votes		50,920	100.0
General election
Democratic	Dave Paul (incumbent)	38,911	52.09
Republican	Karen Lesetmoe	35,711	47.81
Write-in		74	0.10
Total votes		74,696	100.0

=== District 11 ===
11th House District Position 1 election, 2022
Primary election
Party	Candidate	Votes	%
Democratic	David Hackney (incumbent)	17,845	69.27
Republican	Stephanie Peters	7,868	30.54
Write-in		48	0.19
Total votes		25,761	100.0
General election
Democratic	David Hackney (incumbent)	32,292	69.37
Republican	Stephanie Peters	14,204	30.51
Write-in		54	0.12
Total votes		46,550	100.0

11th House District Position 2 election, 2022
Primary election
Party	Candidate	Votes	%
Democratic	Steve Bergquist (incumbent)	17,694	68.24
Republican	Jeanette Burrage	8,192	31.6
Write-in		42	0.16
Total votes		25,928	100.0
General election
Democratic	Steve Bergquist (incumbent)	31,979	68.37
Republican	Jeanette Burrage	14,747	31.53
Write-in		46	0.10
Total votes		46,772	100.0

=== District 12 ===
12th House District Position 1 election, 2022
Primary election
Party	Candidate	Votes	%
Republican	Keith Goehner (incumbent)	27,759	93.12
Write-in		2,052	6.88
Total votes		29,811	100.0
General election
Republican	Keith Goehner (incumbent)	45,819	94.31
Write-in		2,764	5.69
Total votes		48,583	100.0

12th House District Position 2 election, 2022
Primary election
Party	Candidate	Votes	%
Republican	Mike Steele (incumbent)	26,249	80.56
Republican	Robert K Amenn	4,681	14.37
Write-in		1,652	5.07
Total votes		32,582	100.0
General election
Republican	Mike Steele (incumbent)	42,812	78.44
Republican	Robert K Amenn	9,655	17.69
Write-in		2,111	3.87
Total votes		54,578	100.0

=== District 13 ===
13th House District Position 1 election, 2022
Primary election
Party	Candidate	Votes	%
Republican	Tom Dent (incumbent)	25,841	97.34
Write-in		705	2.66
Total votes		26,546	100.0
General election
Republican	Tom Dent (incumbent)	41,617	97.12
Write-in		1,235	2.88
Total votes		42,852	100.0

13th House District Position 2 election, 2022
Primary election
Party	Candidate	Votes	%
Republican	Alex Ybarra (incumbent)	25,693	97.68
Write-in		611	2.32
Total votes		26,304	100.0
General election
Republican	Alex Ybarra (incumbent)	41,425	97.45
Write-in		1,086	2.55
Total votes		42,511	100.0

=== District 14 ===
14th House District Position 1 election, 2022
Primary election
Party	Candidate	Votes	%
Republican	Chris Corry (incumbent)	19,911	68.02
No party preference	Laurene Contreras	9,174	31.34
Write-in		188	0.64
Total votes		29,273	100.0
General election
Republican	Chris Corry (incumbent)	30,367	65.88
No party preference	Laurene Contreras	15,592	33.83
Write-in		135	0.29
Total votes		46,094	100.0

14th House District Position 2 election, 2022
Primary election
Party	Candidate	Votes	%
Republican	Gina Mosbrucker (incumbent)	19,429	64.88
No party preference	Liz Hallock	6,179	20.63
Independent	Chris Faison	4,213	14.07
Write-in		127	0.42
Total votes		29,948	100.0
General election
Republican	Gina Mosbrucker (incumbent)	30,940	66.83
No party preference	Liz Hallock	15,208	32.85
Write-in		148	0.32
Total votes		46,296	100.0

=== District 15 ===
15th House District Position 1 election, 2022
Primary election
Party	Candidate	Votes	%
Republican	Bruce Chandler (incumbent)	10,421	96.47
Write-in		381	3.53
Total votes		10,802	100.0
General election
Republican	Bruce Chandler (incumbent)	17,856	95.70
Write-in		802	4.30
Total votes		18,658	100.0

15th House District Position 2 election, 2022
Primary election
Party	Candidate	Votes	%
Republican	Bryan Sandlin	10,116	96.36
Write-in		382	3.64
Total votes		10,498	100.0
General election
Republican	Bryan Sandlin	17,384	95.74
Write-in		774	4.26
Total votes		18,158	100.0

=== District 16 ===
16th House District Position 1 election, 2022
Primary election
Party	Candidate	Votes	%
Republican	Mark Klicker (incumbent)	24,087	67.46
Democratic	Jeff Strickler	10,336	28.95
Peace and Freedom	Sharon Kay Schiller	1,242	3.48
Write-in		39	0.11
Total votes		35,704	100.0
General election
Republican	Mark Klicker (incumbent)	37,792	68.73
Democratic	Jeff Strickler	17,128	31.15
Write-in		63	0.11
Total votes		54,983	100.0

16th House District Position 2 election, 2022
Primary election
Party	Candidate	Votes	%
Republican	Skyler Rude (incumbent)	25,281	71.57
Democratic	Jan Corn	9,981	28.26
Write-in		59	0.17
Total votes		35,321	100.0
General election
Republican	Skyler Rude (incumbent)	38,916	71.02
Democratic	Jan Corn	15,816	28.86
Write-in		65	0.12
Total votes		54,797	100.0

=== District 17 ===
17th House District Position 1 election, 2022
Primary election
Party	Candidate	Votes	%
Democratic	Terri Niles	20,364	43.4
Republican	Kevin Waters	10,765	22.94
Republican	Hannah Joy	9,169	19.54
Republican	Anthony Ho	6,571	14
Write-in		51	0.11
Total votes		46,920	100.0
General election
Republican	Kevin Waters	36,901	53.15
Democratic	Terri Niles	32,423	46.70
Write-in		110	0.16
Total votes		69,434	100.0

17th House District Position 2 election, 2022
Primary election
Party	Candidate	Votes	%
Democratic	Joe Kear	20,737	44.5
Republican	Paul Harris (incumbent)	14,074	30.2
Republican	Earl Bowerman	6,012	12.9
Republican	Justin Forsman (Note: Listed on ballot as "Prefers Ind. Republican Party.")	5,699	12.23
Write-in		78	0.17
Total votes		46,600	100.0
General election
Republican	Paul Harris (incumbent)	37,860	54.56
Democratic	Joe Kear	31,407	45.26
Write-in		125	0.18
Total votes		69,392	100.0

=== District 18 ===
18th House District Position 1 election, 2022
Primary election
Party	Candidate	Votes	%
Republican	Stephanie McClintock	22,979	52.66
Democratic	John Zingale	20,569	47.13
Write-in		92	0.21
Total votes		43,640	100.0
General election
Republican	Stephanie McClintock	34,012	52.37
Democratic	John Zingale	30,838	47.49
Write-in		92	0.14
Total votes		64,942	100.0

18th House District Position 2 election, 2022
Primary election
Party	Candidate	Votes	%
Democratic	Duncan Camacho	19,237	44.3
Republican	Greg Cheney	9,003	20.73
Republican	John Ley	8,688	20.01
Republican	Brad Benton	6,424	14.79
Write-in		71	0.16
Total votes		43,423	100.0
General election
Republican	Greg Cheney	35,603	54.66
Democratic	Duncan Camacho	29,392	45.13
Write-in		136	0.21
Total votes		65,131	100.0

=== District 19 ===
19th House District Position 1 election, 2022
Primary election
Party	Candidate	Votes	%
Republican	Jim Walsh (incumbent)	27,044	61.03
Democratic	Kelli Hughes-Ham	17,200	38.82
Write-in		66	0.15
Total votes		44,310	100.0
General election
Republican	Jim Walsh (incumbent)	39,940	62.17
Democratic	Kelli Hughes-Ham	24,232	37.72
Write-in		71	0.11
Total votes		64,243	100.0

19th House District Position 2 election, 2022
Primary election
Party	Candidate	Votes	%
Republican	Joel McEntire (incumbent)	26,592	60.43
Democratic	Cara Cusack	13,410	30.47
Democratic	Jon-Erik Hegstad (Note: Listed on ballot as "Prefers Progressive Dem Party.")	3,939	8.95
Write-in		63	0.14
Total votes		44,004	100.0
General election
Republican	Joel McEntire (incumbent)	39,357	61.42
Democratic	Cara Cusack	24,643	38.46
Write-in		81	0.13
Total votes		64,081	100.0

=== District 20 ===
20th House District Position 1 election, 2022
Primary election
Party	Candidate	Votes	%
Republican	Peter Abbarno (incumbent)	33,543	95.52
Write-in		1,575	4.48
Total votes		35,118	100.0
General election
Republican	Peter Abbarno (incumbent)	50,693	96.10
Write-in		2,059	3.90
Total votes		52,752	100.0

20th House District Position 2 election, 2022
Primary election
Party	Candidate	Votes	%
Republican	Ed Orcutt (incumbent)	33,653	95.59
Write-in		1,551	4.41
Total votes		35,204	100.0
General election
Republican	Ed Orcutt (incumbent)	50,764	96.26
Write-in		1,973	3.74
Total votes		52,737	100.0

=== District 21 ===
21st House District Position 1 election, 2022
Primary election
Party	Candidate	Votes	%
Democratic	Strom Peterson (incumbent)	23,082	67.12
Republican	Amy Schaper	11,261	32.75
Write-in		46	0.13
Total votes		34,389	100.0
General election
Democratic	Strom Peterson (incumbent)	38,522	67.36
Republican	Amy Schaper	18,607	32.54
Write-in		55	0.10
Total votes		57,184	100.0

21st House District Position 2 election, 2022
Primary election
Party	Candidate	Votes	%
Democratic	Lillian Ortiz-Self (incumbent)	22,621	65.71
Republican	Petra Bigea	6,130	17.81
Republican	Jenifer Short	5,625	16.34
Write-in		49	0.14
Total votes		34,425	100.0
General election
Democratic	Lillian Ortiz-Self (incumbent)	37,974	66.66
Republican	Petra Bigea	18,942	33.25
Write-in		54	0.09
Total votes		56,970	100.0

=== District 22 ===
22nd House District Position 1 election, 2022
Primary election
Party	Candidate	Votes	%
Democratic	Beth Doglio	22,036	50.06
Republican	Loretta Byrnes	8,786	19.96
Republican	Sans M. Gilmore	5,120	11.63
Democratic	Maria Siguenza	4,978	11.31
Democratic	Sarah León	1,979	4.5
Democratic	Anthony Keen	1,073	2.44
Write-in		48	0.11
Total votes		44,020	100.0
General election
Democratic	Beth Doglio	44,740	65.81
Republican	Loretta Byrnes	23,146	34.05
Write-in		94	0.14
Total votes		67,980	100.0

22nd House District Position 2 election, 2022
Primary election
Party	Candidate	Votes	%
Democratic	Jessica Bateman (incumbent)	27,181	62.03
Republican	Kate Plager	13,672	31.2
Democratic	Kevin Young	2,882	6.58
Write-in		83	0.19
Total votes		43,818	100.0
General election
Democratic	Jessica Bateman (incumbent)	44,925	66.32
Republican	Kate Plager	22,716	33.53
Write-in		98	0.14
Total votes		67,739	100.0

=== District 23 ===
23rd House District Position 1 election, 2022
Primary election
Party	Candidate	Votes	%
Democratic	Tarra Simmons (incumbent)	29,956	64.33
Republican	Janell Hulst	14,338	30.79
Republican	Ace Haynes	2,234	4.80
Write-in		37	0.08
Total votes		46,565	100.0
General election
Democratic	Tarra Simmons (incumbent)	45,223	63.81
Republican	Janell Hulst	25,588	36.11
Write-in		56	0.08
Total votes		70,867	100.0

23rd House District Position 2 election, 2022
Primary election
Party	Candidate	Votes	%
Democratic	Drew Hansen (incumbent)	30,573	66.05
Republican	Paige A Jarquin	15,673	33.86
Write-in		39	0.08
Total votes		46,285	100.0
General election
Democratic	Drew Hansen (incumbent)	46,302	65.29
Republican	Paige A Jarquin	24,568	34.64
Write-in		48	0.07
Total votes		70,918	100.0

=== District 24 ===
24th House District Position 1 election, 2022
Primary election
Party	Candidate	Votes	%
Democratic	Mike Chapman (incumbent)	32,945	57.07
Republican	Sue Forde	16,638	28.82
Republican	Matthew Rainwater	8,099	14.03
Write-in		45	0.08
Total votes		57,727	100.0
General election
Democratic	Mike Chapman (incumbent)	46,050	56.52
Republican	Sue Forde	35,354	43.39
Write-in		73	0.09
Total votes		81,477	100.0

24th House District Position 2 election, 2022
Primary election
Party	Candidate	Votes	%
Democratic	Steve Tharinger (incumbent)	29,210	50.86
Republican	Brian Pruiett	24,195	42.13
Democratic	Darren Corcoran	3,960	6.89
Write-in		71	0.12
Total votes		57,436	100.0
General election
Democratic	Steve Tharinger (incumbent)	44,910	55.33
Republican	Brian Pruiett	36,202	44.60
Write-in		53	0.07
Total votes		81,165	100.0

=== District 25 ===
25th House District Position 1 election, 2022
Primary election
Party	Candidate	Votes	%
Republican	Kelly Chambers (incumbent)	17,814	54.98
Democratic	Jamie Smith	14,526	44.83
Write-in		61	0.19
Total votes		32,401	100.0
General election
Republican	Kelly Chambers (incumbent)	31,366	55.65
Democratic	Jamie Smith	24,924	44.22
Write-in		69	0.12
Total votes		56,359	100.0

25th House District Position 2 election, 2022
Primary election
Party	Candidate	Votes	%
Republican	Cyndy Jacobsen (incumbent)	20,277	89.67
Write-in		2,336	10.33
Total votes		22,613	100.0
General election
Republican	Cyndy Jacobsen (incumbent)	32,380	57.69
Democratic	Cameron Severns	23,666	42.16
Write-in		85	0.15
Total votes		56,131	100.0

=== District 26 ===
26th House District Position 1 election, 2022
Primary election
Party	Candidate	Votes	%
Democratic	Adison Richards	24,900	50.07
Republican	Spencer Hutchins	24,787	49.84
Write-in		44	0.09
Total votes		49,731	100.0
General election
Republican	Spencer Hutchins	37,816	50.46
Democratic	Adison Richards	37,081	49.48
Write-in		45	0.06
Total votes		74,942	100.0

26th House District Position 2 election, 2022
Primary election
Party	Candidate	Votes	%
Republican	Michelle Caldier (incumbent)	27,267	54.91
Democratic	Matt Macklin	22,303	44.92
Write-in		85	0.17
Total votes		49,655	100.0
General election
Republican	Michelle Caldier (incumbent)	42,087	56.20
Democratic	Matt Macklin	32,741	43.72
Write-in		65	0.09
Total votes		74,893	100.0

=== District 27 ===
27th House District Position 1 election, 2022
Primary election
Party	Candidate	Votes	%
Democratic	Laurie Jinkins (incumbent)	24,747	70.91
Republican	Jalonnie Givens Jackson	8,508	24.38
Forward	Todd Briske (Note: Listed on ballot as "(Prefers Forward Party.")	1,572	4.5
Write-in		74	0.21
Total votes		34,901	100.0
General election
Democratic	Laurie Jinkins (incumbent)	41,553	71.50
Republican	Jalonnie Givens Jackson	16,457	28.32
Write-in		109	0.19
Total votes		58,119	100.0

27th House District Position 2 election, 2022
Primary election
Party	Candidate	Votes	%
Democratic	Jake Fey (incumbent)	24,203	69.05
Republican	Janet Large	9,379	26.76
No party preference	Dhaval Patel	1,420	4.05
Write-in		51	0.15
Total votes		35,053	100.0
General election
Democratic	Jake Fey (incumbent)	41,257	70.89
Republican	Janet Large	16,842	28.94
Write-in		96	0.16
Total votes		58,195	100.0

=== District 28 ===
28th House District Position 1 election, 2022
Primary election
Party	Candidate	Votes	%
Democratic	Mari Leavitt (incumbent)	16,832	57.3
Republican	Gabe Sachwitz	5,997	20.42
Republican	Victor Hogan	4,893	16.66
Republican	Dre Le Blanc	1,621	5.52
Write-in		30	0.10
Total votes		29,373	100.0
General election
Democratic	Mari Leavitt (incumbent)	27,095	58.24
Republican	Gabe Sachwitz	19,370	41.63
Write-in		61	0.13
Total votes		46,526	100.0

28th House District Position 2 election, 2022
Primary election
Party	Candidate	Votes	%
Democratic	Dan Bronoske (incumbent)	15,866	54.17
Republican	Susanna Keilman	7,650	26.12
Republican	Chris Nye	5,717	19.52
Write-in		55	0.19
Total votes		29,288	100.0
General election
Democratic	Dan Bronoske (incumbent)	25,886	55.72
Republican	Susanna Keilman	20,496	44.12
Write-in		72	0.15
Total votes		46,454	100.0

=== District 29 ===
29th House District Position 1 election, 2022
Primary election
Party	Candidate	Votes	%
Democratic	Melanie Morgan (incumbent)	10,220	47.89
Republican	Brett Johnson	8,867	41.55
Democratic	Tim Monaghan	2,218	10.39
Write-in		34	0.16
Total votes		21,339	100.0
General election
Democratic	Melanie Morgan (incumbent)	21,674	56.88
Republican	Brett Johnson	16,424	42.93
Write-in		74	0.19
Total votes		38,262	100.0

29th House District Position 2 election, 2022
Primary election
Party	Candidate	Votes	%
Democratic	Sharlett Mena	9,005	42.49
Republican	David H. Figuracion	8,743	41.25
Democratic	Melissa Knott	3,413	16.1
Write-in		34	0.16
Total votes		21,195	100.0
General election
Democratic	Sharlett Mena	22,316	58.40
Republican	David H. Figuracion	15,837	41.45
Write-in		57	0.15
Total votes		38,210	100.0

=== District 30 ===
30th House District Position 1 election, 2022
Primary election
Party	Candidate	Votes	%
Democratic	Jamila Taylor (incumbent)	13,669	54.06
Republican	Casey Jones	7,958	31.47
Republican	Paul McDaniel	2,887	11.42
Republican	Janis Clark	736	2.91
Write-in		35	0.14
Total votes		25,285	100.0
General election
Democratic	Jamila Taylor (incumbent)	23,355	55.36
Republican	Casey Jones	18,800	44.56
Write-in		36	0.09
Total votes		42,191	100.0

30th House District Position 2 election, 2022
Primary election
Party	Candidate	Votes	%
Democratic	Kristine Reeves	10,883	42.96
Republican	Ashli Tagoai	9,390	37.07
Democratic	Carey Anderson	3,521	13.9
Republican	C. Mark Greene (Note: Listed on ballot as "Prefers GOP [Abe Lincoln] Party.")	1,501	5.93
Write-in		36	0.14
Total votes		25,331	100.0
General election
Democratic	Kristine Reeves	23,909	56.82
Republican	Ashli Tagoai	18,126	43.07
Write-in		47	0.11
Total votes		42,082	100.0

=== District 31 ===
31st House District Position 1 election, 2022
Primary election
Party	Candidate	Votes	%
Democratic	Holly Stanton	14,462	38.26
Republican	Drew Stokesbary (incumbent)	13,231	35.00
Republican	Brandon Beynon	10,044	26.57
Write-in		65	0.17
Total votes		37,802	100.0
General election
Republican	Drew Stokesbary (incumbent)	39,051	60.03
Democratic	Holly Stanton	25,929	39.86
Write-in		69	0.11
Total votes		65,049	100.0

31st House District Position 2 election, 2022
Primary election
Party	Candidate	Votes	%
Republican	Eric Robertson (incumbent)	25,260	90.89
Write-in		2,531	9.11
Total votes		27,791	100.0
General election
Republican	Eric Robertson (incumbent)	40,206	62.06
Democratic	Carrie Wilbur	24,489	37.80
Write-in		86	0.13
Total votes		64,781	100.0

=== District 32 ===
32nd House District Position 1 election, 2022
Primary election
Party	Candidate	Votes	%
Democratic	Cindy Ryu (incumbent)	31,071	82.7
Election Integrity	Lori Theis (Note: Listed on ballot as "Prefers Election Integrity Party.")	6,260	16.66
Write-in		241	0.64
Total votes		37,572	100.0
General election
Democratic	Cindy Ryu (incumbent)	51,038	81.67
Election Integrity	Lori Theis	11,155	17.85
Write-in		298	0.48
Total votes		62,491	100.0

32nd House District Position 2 election, 2022
Primary election
Party	Candidate	Votes	%
Democratic	Lauren Davis (incumbent)	30,862	80.67
Republican	Anthony Hubbard	7,249	18.95
Write-in		146	0.38
Total votes		38,257	100.0
General election
Democratic	Lauren Davis (incumbent)	50,403	79.32
Republican	Anthony Hubbard	13,001	20.46
Write-in		140	0.22
Total votes		63,544	100.0

=== District 33 ===
33rd House District Position 1 election, 2022
Primary election
Party	Candidate	Votes	%
Democratic	Tina Orwall (incumbent)	19,401	93.53
Write-in		1,343	6.47
Total votes		20,744	100.0
General election
Democratic	Tina Orwall (incumbent)	31,945	95.22
Write-in		1,603	4.78
Total votes		33,548	100.0

33rd House District Position 2 election, 2022
Primary election
Party	Candidate	Votes	%
Democratic	Mia Su-Ling Gregerson (incumbent)	18,841	93.12
Write-in		1,391	6.88
Total votes		20,232	100.0
General election
Democratic	Mia Su-Ling Gregerson (incumbent)	31,075	95.24
Write-in		1,552	4.76
Total votes		32,627	100.0

=== District 34 ===
34th House District Position 1 election, 2022
Primary election
Party	Candidate	Votes	%
Democratic	Emily Alvarado	23,002	54.04
Democratic	Leah Griffin	13,290	31.22
Republican	Jolie Lansdowne	6,215	14.6
Write-in		60	0.14
Total votes		42,567	100.0
General election
Democratic	Emily Alvarado	44,486	70.42
Democratic	Leah Griffin	17,755	28.11
Write-in		928	1.47
Total votes		63,169	100.0

34th House District Position 2 election, 2022
Primary election
Party	Candidate	Votes	%
Democratic	Joe Fitzgibbon (incumbent)	35,778	83.69
Republican	Andrew Pilloud	6,881	16.1
Write-in		91	0.21
Total votes		42,750	100.0
General election
Democratic	Joe Fitzgibbon (incumbent)	57,269	83.09
Republican	Andrew Pilloud	11,592	16.82
Write-in		66	0.10
Total votes		68,927	100.0

=== District 35 ===
35th House District Position 1 election, 2022
Primary election
Party	Candidate	Votes	%
Republican	Dan Griffey (incumbent)	28,288	57.39
Democratic	James DeHart	20,956	42.51
Write-in		50	0.10
Total votes		49,294	100.0
General election
Republican	Dan Griffey (incumbent)	43,938	58.98
Democratic	James DeHart	30,459	40.89
Write-in		96	0.13
Total votes		74,493	100.0

35th House District Position 2 election, 2022
Primary election
Party	Candidate	Votes	%
Democratic	Sandy Kaiser	22,224	45.26
Republican	Travis Couture	13,226	26.94
Republican	Patti Case	8,299	16.9
Republican	Tiffany Sevruk	5,325	10.84
Write-in		29	0.06
Total votes		49,103	100.0
General election
Republican	Travis Couture	39,445	53.11
Democratic	Sandy Kaiser	34,762	46.81
Write-in		57	0.08
Total votes		74,264	100.0

=== District 36 ===
75.84

36th House District Position 1 election, 2022
Primary election
Party	Candidate	Votes	%
Democratic	Julia G. Reed	24,548	55.1
Democratic	Jeff Manson	6,032	13.54
Democratic	Nicole D. Gomez	4,667	10.47
Democratic	Waylon Robert	4,652	10.44
Democratic	Elizabeth Tyler Crone	4,249	9.54
Write-in		406	0.91
Total votes		44,554	100.0
General election
Democratic	Julia G. Reed	55,251	75.84
Democratic	Jeff Manson	17,077	23.44
Write-in		521	0.72
Total votes		72,849	100.0

36th House District Position 2 election, 2022
Primary election
Party	Candidate	Votes	%
Democratic	Liz Berry (incumbent)	37,407	97.50
Write-in		960	2.50
Total votes		38,367	100.0
General election
Democratic	Liz Berry (incumbent)	61,797	98.51
Write-in		934	1.49
Total votes		62,731	100.0

=== District 37 ===
37th House District Position 1 election, 2022
Primary election
Party	Candidate	Votes	%
Democratic	Sharon Tomiko Santos (incumbent)	32,796	92.15
Republican	John Dickinson	2,596	7.29
Write-in		198	0.56
Total votes		35,590	100.0
General election
Democratic	Sharon Tomiko Santos (incumbent)	54,088	91.14
Republican	John Dickinson	5,112	8.61
Write-in		148	0.25
Total votes		59,348	100.0

37th House District Position 2 election, 2022
Primary election
Party	Candidate	Votes	%
Democratic	Chipalo Street	14,273	41.53
Democratic	Emijah Smith	12,159	35.38
Democratic	Nimco Bulale	4,111	11.96
Democratic	Andrew Ashiofu	3,427	9.97
Write-in		396	1.15
Total votes		34,366	100.0
General election
Democratic	Chipalo Street	30,275	54.62
Democratic	Emijah Smith	24,679	44.52
Write-in		478	0.86
Total votes		55,432	100.0

=== District 38 ===
38th House District Position 1 election, 2022
Primary election
Party	Candidate	Votes	%
Democratic	Julio Cortes	12,118	39.57
Republican	Gary Kemp	6,781	22.14
Democratic	Daryl Williams	6,196	20.23
Republican	Bert Johnson	5,502	17.96
Write-in		30	0.10
Total votes		30,627	100.0
General election
Democratic	Julio Cortes	30,209	58.49
Republican	Gary Kemp	21,376	41.39
Write-in		65	0.13
Total votes		51,650	100.0

38th House District Position 2 election, 2022
Primary election
Party	Candidate	Votes	%
Democratic	Mary Fosse	17,268	55.89
Republican	Mark James	11,831	38.29
Libertarian	David Wiley	1,004	3.25
No party preference	Christopher D. Elliott	763	2.47
Write-in		30	0.10
Total votes		30,896	100.0
General election
Democratic	Mary Fosse	29,373	56.98
Republican	Mark James	22,101	42.87
Write-in		77	0.15
Total votes		51,551	100.0

=== District 39 ===
39th House District Position 1 election, 2022
Primary election
Party	Candidate	Votes	%
Republican	Robert Sutherland (incumbent)	12,835	33.19
Republican	Sam Low	10,498	26.36
Democratic	Claus Joens	8,956	23.16
Democratic	Karl de Jong	6,328	16.36
Write-in		57	0.15
Total votes		38,674	100.0
General election
Republican	Sam Low	31,997	54.39
Republican	Robert Sutherland (incumbent)	24,976	42.46
Write-in		1,856	3.15
Total votes		58,829	100.0

39th House District Position 2 election, 2022
Primary election
Party	Candidate	Votes	%
Republican	Carolyn Eslick (incumbent)	17,281	44.92
Democratic	Jessica Wadhams	14,081	36.6
Republican	Tyller Boomgaarden	4,665	12.13
Independent	Kathryn Lewandowsky	2,390	6.21
Write-in		54	0.14
Total votes		38,471	100.0
General election
Republican	Carolyn Eslick (incumbent)	38,519	59.51
Democratic	Jessica Wadhams	26,082	40.30
Write-in		123	0.19
Total votes		64,724	100.0

=== District 40 ===
40th House District Position 1 election, 2022
Primary election
Party	Candidate	Votes	%
Democratic	Debra Lekanoff (incumbent)	34,261	93.9
Write-in		2,226	6.10
Total votes		36,487	100.0
General election
Democratic	Debra Lekanoff (incumbent)	52,488	69.21
Republican	Shannon Perkes	23,208	30.60
Write-in		142	0.19
Total votes		75,838	100.0

40th House District Position 2 election, 2022
Primary election
Party	Candidate	Votes	%
Democratic	Alex Ramel (incumbent)	28,855	73.22
Democratic	Trevor Smith	9,308	23.62
Write-in		1,245	3.16
Total votes		39,408	100.0
General election
Democratic	Alex Ramel (incumbent)	47,326	73.74
Democratic	Trevor Smith	14,978	23.34
Write-in		1,872	2.92
Total votes		64,176	100.0

=== District 41 ===
41st House District Position 1 election, 2022
Primary election
Party	Candidate	Votes	%
Democratic	Tana Senn (incumbent)	27,958	78.61
Election Integrity	Mike Nykreim	7,339	20.64
Write-in		267	0.75
Total votes		35,564	100.0
General election
Democratic	Tana Senn (incumbent)	46,624	75.91
Election Integrity	Mike Nykreim	14,586	23.75
Write-in		212	0.35
Total votes		61,422	100.0

41st House District Position 2 election, 2022
Primary election
Party	Candidate	Votes	%
Democratic	My-Linh Thai (incumbent)	26,270	69.36
Republican	Al Rosenthal	8,479	22.39
Republican	Elle Nguyen	3,067	8.1
Write-in		60	0.16
Total votes		37,876	100.0
General election
Democratic	My-Linh Thai (incumbent)	43,512	68.43
Republican	Al Rosenthal	20,016	31.48
Write-in		61	0.10
Total votes		63,589	100.0

=== District 42 ===
42nd House District Position 1 election, 2022
Primary election
Party	Candidate	Votes	%
Democratic	Alicia Rule (incumbent)	25,232	48.69
Republican	Tawsha (Dykstra) Thompson	18,235	35.19
Republican	Kamal Bhachu	8,319	16.05
Write-in		34	0.07
Total votes		51,820	100.0
General election
Democratic	Alicia Rule (incumbent)	38,871	51.70
Republican	Tawsha (Dykstra) Thompson	36,220	48.17
Write-in		99	0.13
Total votes		75,190	100.0

42nd House District Position 2 election, 2022
Primary election
Party	Candidate	Votes	%
Democratic	Joe Timmons	14,826	28.86
Republican	Dan Johnson	14,324	27.88
Republican	Kyle Christensen	12,220	23.79
Democratic	Richard May	9,961	19.39
Write-in		38	0.07
Total votes		51,369	100.0
General election
Democratic	Joe Timmons	38,381	51.26
Republican	Dan Johnson	36,249	48.65
Write-in		71	0.09
Total votes		74,881	100.0

=== District 43 ===
43rd House District Position 1 election, 2022
Primary election
Party	Candidate	Votes	%
Democratic	Nicole Macri (incumbent)	30,161	98.14
Write-in		573	1.86
Total votes		30,734	100.0
General election
Democratic	Nicole Macri (incumbent)	50,700	98.69
Write-in		673	1.31
Total votes		51,373	100.0

43rd House District Position 2 election, 2022
Primary election
Party	Candidate	Votes	%
Democratic	Frank Chopp (incumbent)	29,531	97.67
Write-in		704	2.33
Total votes		30,235	100.0
General election
Democratic	Frank Chopp (incumbent)	50,175	98.42
Write-in		807	1.58
Total votes		50,982	100.0

=== District 44 ===
44th House District Position 1 election, 2022
Primary election
Party	Candidate	Votes	%
Democratic	Brandy Donaghy (incumbent)	19,978	53.49
Republican	Mark Harmsworth	17,335	46.42
Write-in		34	0.09
Total votes		37,347	100.0
General election
Democratic	Brandy Donaghy (incumbent)	33,603	53.33
Republican	Mark Harmsworth	29,362	46.60
Write-in		42	0.07
Total votes		63,007	100.0

44th House District Position 2 election, 2022
Primary election
Party	Candidate	Votes	%
Democratic	April Berg (incumbent)	21,111	56.56
Republican	Ryne Rohla	16,182	43.36
Write-in		30	0.08
Total votes		37,323	100.0
General election
Democratic	April Berg (incumbent)	35,582	56.60
Republican	Ryne Rohla	27,239	43.33
Write-in		42	0.07
Total votes		62,863	100.0

=== District 45 ===
45th House District Position 1 election, 2022
Primary election
Party	Candidate	Votes	%
Democratic	Roger Goodman (incumbent)	27,564	69.98
Republican	Cherese Bourgoin	11,779	29.91
Write-in		44	0.11
Total votes		39,387	100.0
General election
Democratic	Roger Goodman (incumbent)	44,739	69.53
Republican	Cherese Bourgoin	19,968	30.36
Write-in		72	0.11
Total votes		65,779	100.0

45th House District Position 2 election, 2022
Primary election
Party	Candidate	Votes	%
Democratic	Larry Springer (incumbent)	28,373	72.3
Republican	John P. Gibbons	7,951	20.26
Election Integrity	Amber Krabach	2,830	7.21
Write-in		88	0.22
Total votes		39,242	100.0
General election
Democratic	Larry Springer (incumbent)	47,282	72.66
Republican	John P. Gibbons	17,665	27.15
Write-in		123	0.19
Total votes		65,070	100.0

=== District 46 ===
46th House District Position 1 election, 2022
Primary election
Party	Candidate	Votes	%
Democratic	Gerry Pollet (incumbent)	32,734	82.83
Democratic	Hadeel Jeanne	6,244	15.8
Write-in		540	1.37
Total votes		39,518	100.0
General election
Democratic	Gerry Pollet (incumbent)	53,179	85.13
Democratic	Hadeel Jeanne	8,829	14.13
Write-in		463	0.74
Total votes		62,471	100.0

46th House District Position 2 election, 2022
Primary election
Party	Candidate	Votes	%
Democratic	Darya Farivar	13,162	31.64
Democratic	Lelach Rave	11,667	28.05
Democratic	Melissa Taylor	7,909	19.01
Democratic	Nancy Connolly	6,572	15.8
Democratic	Nina Martinez	1,863	4.48
Write-in		424	1.02
Total votes		41,597	100.0
General election
Democratic	Darya Farivar	38,602	59.20
Democratic	Lelach Rave	26,139	40.09
Write-in		464	0.71
Total votes		65,205	100.0

=== District 47 ===
47th House District Position 1 election, 2022
Primary election
Party	Candidate	Votes	%
Democratic	Debra Entenman (incumbent)	16,512	55.27
Republican	Kyle Lyebyedyev	9,255	30.98
Republican	Jessie L. Ramsey	4,064	13.6
Write-in		42	0.14
Total votes		29,873	100.0
General election
Democratic	Debra Entenman (incumbent)	28,385	57.13
Republican	Kyle Lyebyedyev	21,239	42.75
Write-in		58	0.12
Total votes		49,682	100.0

47th House District Position 2 election, 2022
Primary election
Party	Candidate	Votes	%
Democratic	Chris Stearns	10,051	33.4
Democratic	Shukri Olow	5,903	19.62
Republican	Barry Knowles	5,252	17.45
Republican	Ted Cooke	4,566	15.17
Republican	Carmen Goers	4,294	14.27
Write-in		25	0.08
Total votes		30,091	100.0
General election
Democratic	Chris Stearns	27,057	63.73
Democratic	Shukri Olow	13,196	31.08
Write-in		2,203	5.19
Total votes		42,456	100.0

=== District 48 ===
48th House District Position 1 election, 2022
Primary election
Party	Candidate	Votes	%
Democratic	Vandana Slatter (incumbent)	20,098	94.45
Write-in		1,181	5.55
Total votes		21,279	100.0
General election
Democratic	Vandana Slatter (incumbent)	33,914	96.39
Write-in		1,270	3.61
Total votes		35,184	100.0

48th House District Position 2 election, 2022
Primary election
Party	Candidate	Votes	%
Democratic	Amy Walen (incumbent)	19,935	94.31
Write-in		1,202	5.69
Total votes		21,137	100.0
General election
Democratic	Amy Walen (incumbent)	33,557	96.31
Write-in		1,287	3.69
Total votes		34,844	100.0

=== District 49 ===
49th House District Position 1 election, 2022
Primary election
Party	Candidate	Votes	%
Democratic	Sharon Wylie (incumbent)	20,786	61.67
Republican	Park Llafet	12,818	38.03
Write-in		101	0.30
Total votes		33,705	100.0
General election
Democratic	Sharon Wylie (incumbent)	31,967	61.95
Republican	Park Llafet	19,538	37.86
Write-in		97	0.19
Total votes		51,602	100.0

49th House District Position 2 election, 2022
Primary election
Party	Candidate	Votes	%
Democratic	Monica Jurado Stonier (incumbent)	20,299	59.97
Republican	Jeremy Baker	13,475	39.81
Write-in		77	0.23
Total votes		33,851	100.0
General election
Democratic	Monica Jurado Stonier (incumbent)	31,573	60.89
Republican	Jeremy Baker	20,198	38.95
Write-in		80	0.15
Total votes		51,851	100.0

== See also ==
- 2022 Washington State Senate election
- 2022 United States House of Representatives elections in Washington
