= Deken Letinich =

American politician

Member-elect of the Washington House of Representatives from the 18th district
- Assuming office January 2027
- Succeeding: John Ley

Personal details
- Party: Democratic

Deken Letinich is an American politician. A member of the Democratic Party, he is the member-elect for the 18th district of the Washington House of Representatives.
