= Jack Cairnes =

American politician

Member of the Washington House of Representatives from the 47th district
- In office January 9, 1995 – January 10, 2005
- Preceded by: Elmira Forner
- Succeeded by: Pat Sullivan

Personal details
- Born: April 2, 1943 (age 83)
- Party: Republican
- Spouse: Andrea Cairnes
- Children: 4
- Education: Cameron University (BS); Ball State University (MA)

Jack Cairnes (born April 2, 1943) is an American politician who served as a member of the Washington House of Representatives, representing the 47th district from 1995 to 2005. A member of the Republican Party, he was defeated by Democrat Pat Sullivan in 2004.

== Personal life ==
Cairnes' wife is Andrea Cairnes. They have four children. Cairnes and his family live in Covington, Washington.
