= Liz Pike =

American politician (born 1960)

Member of the Washington House of Representatives from the 18th district
- In office January 14, 2013 – January 14, 2019
- Preceded by: Ed Orcutt
- Succeeded by: Larry Hoff
- In office August 23, 2012 – December 6, 2012
- Preceded by: Ann Rivers
- Succeeded by: Brandon Vick

Camas City Council, At-Large Position
- In office January 1, 2004 – January 1, 2008
- Preceded by: Dale E. Thomas
- Succeeded by: Don Chaney

Personal details
- Born: Elizabeth Jane Samwel; January 7, 1960 (age 66) Brush Prairie, Washington
- Party: Republican
- Spouse(s): Robert Andrew Bramley (1980-1984); David Philip Pike (1986-1995); Mark Alan Erikson (1997-2004)
- Website: Official website
- Other names: Elizabeth Jane Bramley, Elizabeth Jane Pike, Elizabeth Jane Erikson

Elizabeth Jane Pike (née Samwel; born January 7, 1960) is an American politician. Pike served as a Republican in the Washington House of Representatives, representing the 18th Legislative District in Position 2. On August 23, 2012, Pike was appointed to complete Ann Rivers' 2011–13 term as state representative in the 18th District in Position 1. Rivers had been appointed to complete Joe Zarelli's 2009–13 term as State Senator in the 18th District following Zarelli's retirement. Brandon Vick ultimately was elected as the state representative in the 18th District in Position 1 in the 2012 election, which Pike vacated due to her concurrent successful run for Position 2.

== Personal background ==
Liz Pike was born on January 7, 1960, and raised on a Brush Prairie, Washington dairy farm as one of 13 children. She attended Battle Ground High School and graduated with honors. She also attended Clark College. She has two children.

== Career ==
Pike has owned and operated Pike Advertising and triathlon/running event company. Her professional background includes serving as the political director with the Building Industry Association of Clark County, divisional board member of Umpqua Bank, and board member of her homeowner association.

=== Camas City government ===
In 2003, Pike ran successfully for a nonpartisan at-large position on the Camas City Council. In the primary, Pike, running under her then married surname of Erikson, finished first with 51 percent of the vote versus David Gast's 35.8 percent and Bruce Lindoff's 13.3 percent. In the General Election, Pike edged out Gast with 51.72 percent of the vote.

In 2007, instead of running for reelection for the Camas City Council, Pike challenged the incumbent Camas mayor, Paul Dennis. During the summer, The Vancouver Voice courted controversy around the mayoral race after publishing a vitriolic letter from one of its readers that attacked the character of Pike. She responded by sending a letter of complaint from her attorney to the paper and the writer of the letter (who is unaffiliated with the paper's staff). In the General Election, Pike was defeated by Dennis, earning only 25 percent of the vote.

=== Washington State government ===
On January 23, 2012, Pike announced that she would be running for state representative in the 18th District in Position 2, vacated by Ed Orcutt who was redistricted into the 20th District. The 18th District's state senator, Joe Zarelli, announced minutes after the end of the candidate filing period on May 18, 2012, that he would not be seeking reelection. Zarelli notified Ann Rivers earlier in the day that he wouldn't be seeking reelection and invited her to run for his soon to be former senate seat. Likewise, minutes before the end of the filing period State Representative Paul Harris informed Brandon Vick that Rivers was going to run for Zarelli's senate seat and that he should run for Rivers' state representative seat. At the end of May, Zarelli announced that he would not only be not running for reelection, but retiring early. His resignation set off a chain of events, wherein Rivers was first appointed to complete Zarelli's senate term. Pike was appointed to complete Rivers' term as state representative. The Cowlitz and Clark county commissioners had selected Pike, despite Vick being the first choice of the district's Precinct Committee Officers.

In the Primary Election, Pike faced Democrats David Shehorn, chair of the 18th District Democrats and retired computer systems engineer, and Ryan Gompertz, a 19-year-old history and economics major at the University of Washington. The results of the primary were Pike receiving the most votes with 61.3 percent of the vote, while Shehorn and Gompertz received 30.1 percent and 8.6 percent, respectively. In the General Election, Pike received 60.46 percent of the vote to Shehorn's 39.54 percent. Pike's term as an appointed state representative for the 18th District in Position 1 ended on December 6, 2012. She was sworn in as state representative for the 18th District in Position 2 on January 14, 2013.

== Awards ==
- 2014 Guardians of Small Business award. Presented by NFIB.
