= Greg Cheney =

American politician

Member of the Washington House of Representatives from the 18th district
- In office January 9, 2023 – January 13, 2025
- Preceded by: Larry Hoff
- Succeeded by: John Ley

Personal details
- Party: Republican

Greg Cheney is an American politician. He was a member for the 18th district (Position 2) in the Washington House of Representatives.

== Life and career ==
Cheney is an attorney.

In August 2022, Cheney defeated Brad Benton and John Ley in the nonpartisan primary election for Position 2 for the 18th district of the Washington House of Representatives. In November 2022, he defeated Duncan Camacho in the general election, winning 55 percent of the votes. He succeeded Larry Hoff, taking office in 2023.
