= Randi Knott =

American politician

Member-elect of the Washington House of Representatives from the 18th district
- Assuming office January 2027
- Succeeding: Stephanie McClintock

Personal details
- Party: Democratic

Randi Knott is an American politician. A member of the Democratic Party, she is the member-elect for the 18th district of the Washington House of Representatives.
