= Elmira Forner =

Canadian-born American politician from Washington

Member of the Washington House of Representatives from the 47th district
- In office January 8, 1990 – January 9, 1995
- Preceded by: Michael Patrick
- Succeeded by: Jack Cairnes

Personal details
- Born: February 26, 1941 (age 85) Canada
- Party: Republican

Elmira Forner (born February 26, 1941) is a Canadian-born American politician who served in the Washington House of Representatives from the 47th district from 1990 to 1995.
