= Brandon Vick =

American politician from Washington

Member of the Washington House of Representatives from the 18th district
- In office December 7, 2012 – January 9, 2023 Serving with Larry Hoff
- Preceded by: Liz Pike
- Succeeded by: Stephanie McClintock

Personal details
- Born: Brandon Parker Vick; 1984 (age 41–42) California, U.S.
- Party: Republican
- Education: Clark College; Washington State University (attended)
- Occupation: Politician
- Website: official website

Brandon Parker Vick (born 1984) is an American politician of the Republican Party. He was a member of the Washington House of Representatives, representing the 18th district, first elected to that position in 2012. He first ran for office against Ann Rivers for the seat in 2010, but lost. He once served as chairman of the Clark County Republican Party.

== Awards ==
- 2014 Guardians of Small Business award. Presented by NFIB.
