= Jeanette Burrage =

American politician

Jeannette Burrage

Member of the Washington House of Representatives from the District 31 district
- In office 1981–1983

Personal details
- Born: November 2, 1952 (age 73) Dickinson, North Dakota
- Party: Republican
- Education: University of Washington School of Law

Jeanette R. Berleen Burrage (born November 2, 1952) is an American politician. She is a Republican, representing District 31 in the Washington House of Representatives which included parts of King County, from 1981 to 1983. In 1994, she ran for Washington Supreme Court.

Burrage ran for District 33 in the 2014 Washington House of Representatives election. Burrage ran for District 11 in the 2022 Washington House of Representatives election.
