= Lynn Kessler =

American politician from Washington

Majority Leader of the Washington House of Representatives
- In office January 11, 1999 – November 19, 2010 Serving with Dave Mastin (1999–2002)
- Preceded by: Barbara Lisk
- Succeeded by: Pat Sullivan

Member of the Washington House of Representatives from the 24th district
- In office January 11, 1993 – January 10, 2011
- Preceded by: Jim Hargrove
- Succeeded by: Steve Tharinger

Personal details
- Born: February 26, 1941 (age 85) Seattle, Washington, U.S.
- Party: Democratic
- Spouse: Keith Kessler
- Children: 4
- Education: Seattle University (attended)

Lynn E. Kessler (born February 26, 1941) is an American politician who served as a member of the Washington House of Representatives, representing the 24th district from 1993 to 2011. A member of the Democratic Party, she served as the House Majority Leader from 1999 to 2010.

She also served on the Washington State Fine Arts Commission and the National Association of State Arts Agencies (NASAA). She is a former small-business owner and executive director of the United Way of Grays Harbor.

Lynn Kessler, was recognized in 2010 as the National Legislator of the Year (Excellence in Legislative Leadership) by the National Council of State Legislatures.http://www.ncsl.org/ Additionally, Kessler was recognized as one of the top 100 legislators in the nation.

In early 2010, Kessler announced her retirement, telling House members that she would not run for re-election in the fall. As one of WA Legislature's top lawmakers, she has been in the Legislature for 18 years and served in the majority leadership team for about a decade. As a majority leader, Kessler was the second-ranking Democrat in the state House.

Kessler has been a leader on open government issues in the Legislature. She served on the state's "Sunshine Committee," examining state open-government policies.

She and her husband Keith are the parents of four and the grandparents of Kyle, Ryan and Arita. They live in Hoquiam.

Washington House of Representatives
Preceded by Barbara Lisk	Majority Leader of the Washington House of Representatives; 1999–2010	Succeeded by Pat Sullivan
