= Pat Sullivan (politician) =

American politician (born 1962)

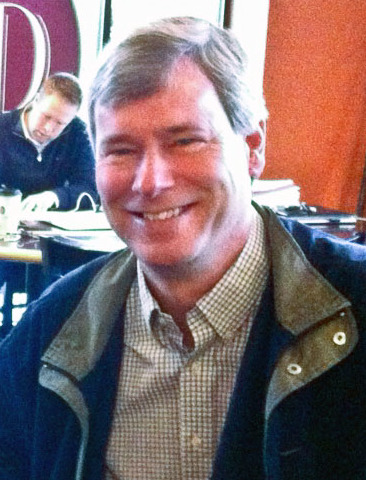

Majority Leader of the Washington House of Representatives
- In office November 19, 2010 – November 21, 2022
- Preceded by: Lynn Kessler
- Succeeded by: Joe Fitzgibbon

Member of the Washington House of Representatives from the 47th district
- In office January 10, 2005 – October 17, 2022
- Preceded by: Jack Cairnes
- Succeeded by: Chris Stearns

Mayor of Covington
- In office August 31, 1997 – January 10, 2005
- Preceded by: Position established
- Succeeded by: Margaret Harto

Personal details
- Born: July 20, 1962 (age 64) Duluth, Minnesota, U.S.
- Party: Democratic
- Spouse: Amy Sullivan (m. 1987)
- Children: 3
- Education: University of Washington, Seattle (BA)

Patrick J. Sullivan (born July 20, 1962) is an American politician who served as a member of the Washington House of Representatives, representing the 47th district from 2005 to 2022. A member of the Democratic Party, he served as the House Majority Leader from 2010 to 2022 and served on the Ways and Means Committee.

== Early life and career ==
Sullivan earned a BA from the University of Washington.

Sullivan served as the first mayor of Covington. He also worked as a legislative assistant in Olympia and the King County Council.

Washington House of Representatives
Preceded by Lynn Kessler	Majority Leader of the Washington House of Representatives; 2010–2022	Succeeded by Joe Fitzgibbon
