= 50 States One Israel =

Conference held in Israel

- Date: September 14–18, 2025
- Location: Jerusalem, Israel
- Organized by: Israeli Ministry of Foreign Affairs
- Participants: 241 American state legislators

50 States One Israel is an initiative led by the Israeli Foreign Ministry to bring American state and territorial politicians, along with business leaders, to Israel. Three delegations have been held in September 2025, October 2026, and November 2026. The first delegation was described as the largest delegation of elected officials to visit Israel. According to Lior Haiat, Deputy Director for North America at the Foreign Ministry, lawmakers including state legislators from all 50 states were in attendance.

== Background ==
US state legislators began receiving invitations to the conference in early May 2025. The conference, including travel, is paid entirely by the Israeli government. According to a July 8, 2025, letter to Oregon Representative David Gomberg sent by Israel's consulate-general to the Northwest, The Ministry of Foreign Affairs will provide "roundtrip economy airfare from New York to Tel Aviv (including domestic U.S. flights to NYC)," and "all in-country transportation, accommodations, meals, and guided programming." Five lawmakers from each state were invited to attend.

== Conferences ==
=== 2025 ===
The first delegation of attendees arrived September 14, 2025, and departed September 18, 2025.

On September 15, 2025, attendees visited the Western Wall and the Church of the Holy Sepulchre. Later, Foreign Minister Gideon Sa'ar urged American lawmakers to pass anti-BDS laws in their states. In the evening, Prime Minister of Israel Benjamin Netanyahu gave a welcome address to the delegation.

On September 16, 2025, attendees visited communities impacted by the October 7 attacks.

On September 17, 2025, President of Israel Isaac Herzog addressed the delegation, saying that Israel's "ironclad bond with the United States of America [exists] because we drink from the same fountain: the values of the Bible".

In July 2026, The Stranger reported that four of the attendees included Representatives David Hackney, Mari Leavitt, Drew Stokesbary and Chris Corry. All four received gifts worth thousands of dollars from the Israeli government to attend the conference.

=== 2026 ===
From October 18, 2026 to October 23, 2026, 250 US technology sector leaders comprised the second delegation, known as the Flightech delegation.

In November 2026, Israeli foreign minister Gideon Sa'ar hosted 250 young leaders from all 50 states for the initiative's third delegation. Sa'ar told the delegation, "In this new era of strategic competition, America needs strong and reliable allies. Israel is precisely the ally America needs." The participants are scheduled to tour sites in Israel, as well as Yad Vashem and communities close to the Gaza border.

== See also ==
- Hasbara – Public relations work by the State of Israel
