= John Ley (politician) =

American politician

Member of the Washington House of Representatives from the 18th district
- Incumbent
- Assumed office January 13, 2025 Serving with Stephanie McClintock
- Preceded by: Greg Cheney
- Succeeded by: Deken Letinich (elect)

Personal details
- Party: Republican

John Ley is an American politician. He is a member of the Washington House of Representatives from the 18th district.

== Life and career ==
Ley is a former United States Air Force pilot, airline pilot, and reporter for Clark County Today.

Ley ran as a candidate for the district in 2022 but was disqualified to run after the Clark County Superior Court charged him with felony election fraud, alleging him of not living in the 18th district, providing false information for voter registration and on a declaration of candidacy. In 2024, he was again accused of not living within the district. As of October 2024, there is an ongoing case against Ley due to allegations of election fraud.

In August 2024, Ley defeated Philip Johnson in the nonpartisan primary election for the 18th district of the Washington House of Representatives. In November 2024, he defeated John Zingale in the general election, winning 50.9 percent of the vote. He succeeded Greg Cheney, and assumed office on January 13, 2025.
