= Joe Timmons (politician) =

American politician from Washington

Member of the Washington House of Representatives from the 42nd district
- Incumbent
- Assumed office December 21, 2022 Serving with Alicia Rule
- Preceded by: Sharon Shewmake

Personal details
- Born: Joseph Timmons; March 18, 1985 (age 41)
- Party: Democratic
- Education: Western Washington University, B.A. in political science University of Washington, M.P.A.
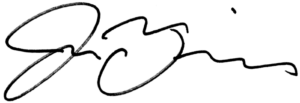
- Signature

Joe Timmons is an American Democratic politician serving Washington State’s 42nd legislative district (Whatcom County, Washington) in the Washington House of Representatives, alongside Alicia Rule. He won the seat in the 2022 election defeating Republican candidate Dan Johnson, and was sworn in on December 21, 2022.

== Committees ==
He currently serves on three committees: House Transportation Committee, where he is vice chair, the House Education Committee, and the Postsecondary Education and Workforce Committee.
