= The Vancouver Voice =

- August 2007 cover, with a caricature of Vancouver mayor Royce Pollard
- Type: Alternative monthly
- Format: Tabloid
- Owner: News-Register Publishing Company
- Publisher: Oregon Lithoprint, Inc., Guy Everingham
- Editor: Ossie Bladine
- Founded: October 2006
- Ceased publication: August 2011
- Language: English
- Headquarters: Vancouver, Washington
- Circulation: 13,000
- Website: www.vanvoice.com

The Vancouver Voice was an alternative newspaper serving Clark County and Southwest Washington in the United States, with a focus on the area's largest city, Vancouver. It ceased publication with volume 5, issue 13 of August 19, 2011.

== History ==
In early 2006, The Vanguard, a previous two-year-old alternative publication for Vancouver, folded. Several of the staff and writers involved with The Vanguard came together soon after its demise to continue the nascent tradition of an alternative periodical for the rapidly expanding population of Clark County. Former Vanguard columnist and Willamette Week Screen editor James Walling joined with longtime cohort Eric A. Johnson and soon-to-be production manager Melissa Wolf to found The Vancouver Voice.

In the summer of 2007, the publication became embroiled in some of the controversy surrounding the Camas, Washington mayoral race after publishing a vitriolic letter from one of its readers that attacked the character of candidate and former city councilwoman Liz Pike. Pike responded by sending a letter of complaint from her attorney to the paper and the writer of the letter (who is unaffiliated with the paper's staff). Walling declined to acquiesce to Pike's complaint. In the general election, Pike was defeated by Paul Dennis, earning only 25 percent of the vote.

In September 2010, Voice freelancer Marcus Griffith was the first journalist to question what was initially reported as a local acid attack. The incident which later was revealed to be a hoax, and resulted in felony theft charges related to funds gathered for the alleged victim. Griffith posted his initial investigation on the website of the paper. This resulted in The Voice being labeled "Satan's paper" by religious groups sympathetic to the perpetrator of the hoax.

In 2011, the paper's Oregon-based owners offered if for sale, after having purchased it in 2008 from Vancouver resident James Walling. After three years the paper was folded by Oregon Lithoprint Incorporated, citing "general economic malaise in the region, and specific challenges to the newspaper industry."

== Content and focus ==
The Voice featured content in the vein of most traditional alternative weekly periodicals, though more serious journalistic coverage of crimes and similar incidents has occurred. Past cover stories have included conflicting development models in the area (high density mixed use versus urban sprawl), and the tenth anniversary of Vancouver School of Arts and Academics.
