= Larry Hoff =

American politician from Washington

Larry A. Hoff

Member of the Washington House of Representatives from the 18th district district
- In office January 14, 2019 – January 9, 2023
- Preceded by: Liz Pike
- Succeeded by: Greg Cheney

Personal details
- Born: 1951 (age 74–75) Bismarck, North Dakota, U.S.
- Party: Republican
- Education: University of North Dakota (BA, BS)
- Website: official

Larry A. Hoff (born 1951) is an American politician formerly serving in the Washington State House of Representatives for the 18th legislative district.

== Awards ==
- 2021 Legislator of the Year award. Presented by Washington Farm Bureau.
