= Ed Orcutt =

American politician (born 1963)

Member of the Washington House of Representatives from the 20th district
- Incumbent
- Assumed office January 14, 2011 Serving with Peter Abbarno
- Preceded by: Gary Alexander

Member of the Washington House of Representatives from the 18th district
- In office January 4, 2002 – January 14, 2011
- Preceded by: John Pennington
- Succeeded by: Liz Pike

Personal details
- Born: Edmund Thomas Orcutt; May 4, 1963 (age 63) New Vineyard, Maine, U.S.
- Party: Republican
- Spouse: Marcie Orcutt
- Education: University of Idaho
- Occupation: Politician
- Website: Representative Ed Orcutt

Edmund Thomas Orcutt (born May 4, 1963) is an American politician of the Republican Party. He is a member of the Washington House of Representatives, representing the 18th district, serving since 2002. Due to redistricting, Orcutt now resides in the 20th district in Washington. In the 2012 election, Orcutt ran for the seat in that district, and won, with 68% of the vote. Orcutt began representing the 20th district, in his sixth full term, in January 2013.

== Early life ==
Ed Orcutt was born on May 4, 1963, in New Vineyard, Maine. He received an Associate's Degree in science from the University of Maine in 1984, and a Bachelor of Science in 1987. Orcutt originally made a living as a forestry consultant, before making the switch to politics. Orcutt is an active volunteer. He is a past president of the Lions Club and is a member of the Kalama Lions. He served as chairman of the Highlander Festival, a board member of Columbia Theatre Board, and as a youth bowling coach.

== House of Representatives ==
=== Appointment ===
Orcutt was appointed in January 2002 to finish a term in the Washington State House, upon the resignation of John Pennington, who had resigned to become Federal Emergency Management Agency Director for Region X.

=== Tenure ===
Within three months, Orcutt's first bill had already been passed, and was being signed by Governor of Washington, Gary Locke. House bill 2767 prohibits people from gambling with public-assistance debit cards, saying he felt he was simply carrying out the work of his predecessor. The amended bill passed both the House and Senate without a dissenting vote.

Orcutt is the assistant ranking minority member of the House's Community, Economic Development and Housing Committee and the Ways and Means Committee. He also serves on the Agriculture and Natural Resources Committee and the Washington State Economic and Revenue Forecast Council.

Orcutt has said that, under no circumstances will he raise taxes to balance the budget, he opposes Same-sex marriage, and wants more money sent to school districts to better fund education.

Orcutt's hometown of Kalama, Washington, was originally in Washington's 18th district, but, due to redistricting, it was moved to the 20th district. Orcutt ran for, and won that seat, and has served there since January 2013.

Orcutt has posited that since bicyclists have increased respiration, they emit more carbon dioxide into the atmosphere, and "since CO2 is deemed to be a greenhouse gas and a pollutant, bicyclists are actually polluting when they ride". Following nationwide controversy in the cycling community over his remarks, Orcutt apologized and stated "[his] point was that by not driving a car, a cyclist was not necessarily having a zero-carbon footprint. In looking back, it was not a point worthy of even mentioning."

In response to a petition asking for more infrastructure spending following the collapse of the I-5 bridge north of Seattle, he sent an email out saying that, "11 out of 12 sections of the bridge were still standing."

== Awards ==
- 2014 Guardians of Small Business award. Presented by NFIB.
- 2020 Guardians of Small Business. Presented by NFIB.

== Personal life ==
Orcutt married his wife, Marcie, in 1996. They have no children. They reside in Kalama, Washington.
