= Mari Leavitt =

American politician (born 1968)

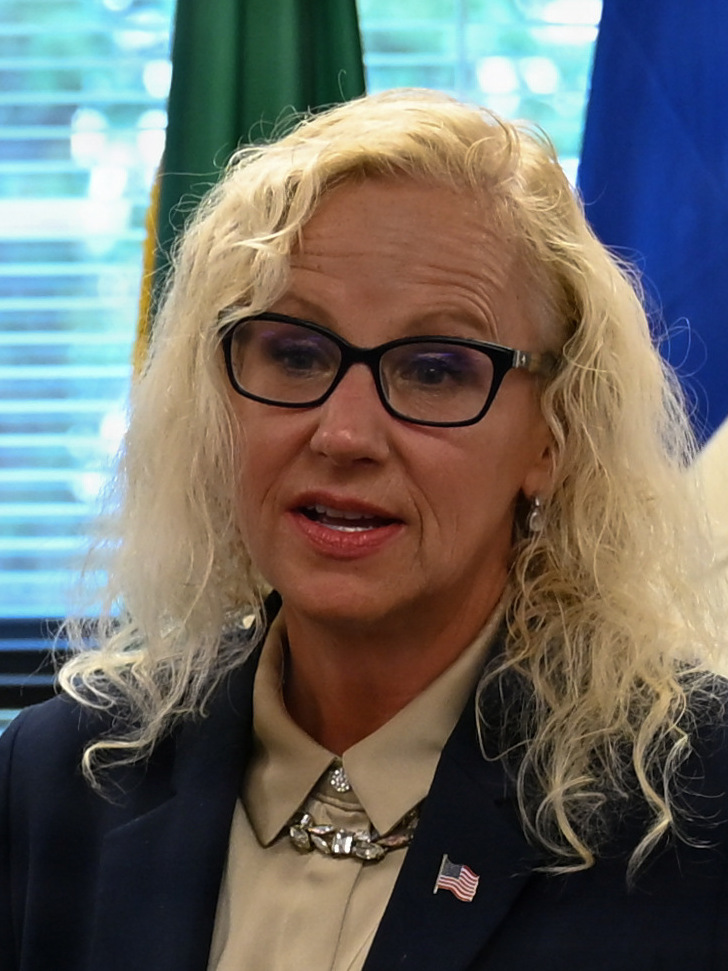
- Leavitt speaking in 2025

Member of the Washington House of Representatives from the 28th district
- Incumbent
- Assumed office January 14, 2019 Serving with Dan Bronoske
- Preceded by: Dick Muri

Personal details
- Born: Mari Lynn Hyzer; 1968 (age 57–58) North Carolina, U.S.
- Party: Democratic
- Education: Tacoma Community College (AAS); Western Washington University (BA, M.Ed.); Oregon State University (PhD)

Mari Lynn Kruger Leavitt (née Hyzer; born 1968) is an American politician from Washington. She serves in the Washington House of Representatives for 28th legislative district in Pierce County.

== Education ==
Leavitt earned an associate degree from Tacoma Community College. She later earned bachelor's and master's degrees from Western Washington University before getting her PhD in Community College Leadership at Oregon State University.

== Career ==
Prior to being elected to the Washington House, Leavitt served as the chair of the Pierce County Ethics Commission. She was first elected to the Washington House in 2018, when she defeated Dick Muri, the incumbent Republican representative.

In 2025, Leavitt participated in the 50 States One Israel conference, a tour of Israel paid for by the Israeli Ministry of Foreign Affairs. In June of 2026, she joined Representatives Travis Couture and Chris Corry in calling for Luc Jasmin, a member of the Washington State Human Rights Commission, to resign after making remarks that were seen as trivializing antisemitism. Jasmin resigned from the commission on July 1, 2026. In August 2026, The Seattle Times reported that Leavitt had sent a letter to the University of Washington to express concerns over a planned lecture by Hasan Piker, a political commentator known for his criticism of the Israeli government.

== Notable legislation ==
Leavitt voted in favor of HB 1589, which is described as supporting Washington's clean energy economy and transitioning to a clean, affordable, and reliable energy future by prohibiting the expansion of natural gas services and other regulations on natural gas companies.

Leavitt voted in favor of HB 1054, which is described as establishing requirements for tactics and equipment used by peace officers by adding restrictions on vehicular pursuits, as well as prohibiting law enforcement from using chokeholds, the deployment of tear gas, or unleashed police dogs in the arrest or apprehension of suspects.

In 2026, Leavitt sponsored HB 2589, which would have imposed restrictions on encampment protests at universities in Washington. Also in 2026, she voted in favor of SB 6346, which imposed a 9.9% tax on Washington residents who make more than $1 million in income a year, and authored a successful amendment to the bill that exempted public libraries from sales tax on some services.

== Election results ==
Washington State Legislative District 28 - State Representative Pos. 1, 2018
Party	Candidate	Votes	%
Democratic	Mari Leavitt	27,735	52.8
Republican	Dick Muri (incumbent)	24,789	47.2

Washington State Legislative District 28 - State Representative Pos. 1, 2020
Party	Candidate	Votes	%
Democratic	Mari Leavitt (incumbent)	39,973	57.2
Republican	Kevin Ballard	29,785	42.6

Washington State Legislative District 28 - State Representative Pos. 1, 2022
Party	Candidate	Votes	%
Democratic	Mari Leavitt (incumbent)	27,095	58.2
Republican	Gabe Sachwitz	19,370	41.6

Washington State Legislative District 28 - State Representative Pos. 1, 2024
Party	Candidate	Votes	%
Democratic	Mari Leavitt (incumbent)	34,629	58.4
Republican	Gabe Sachwitz	24,549	41.4
