= Debra Entenman =

American politician from Washington state

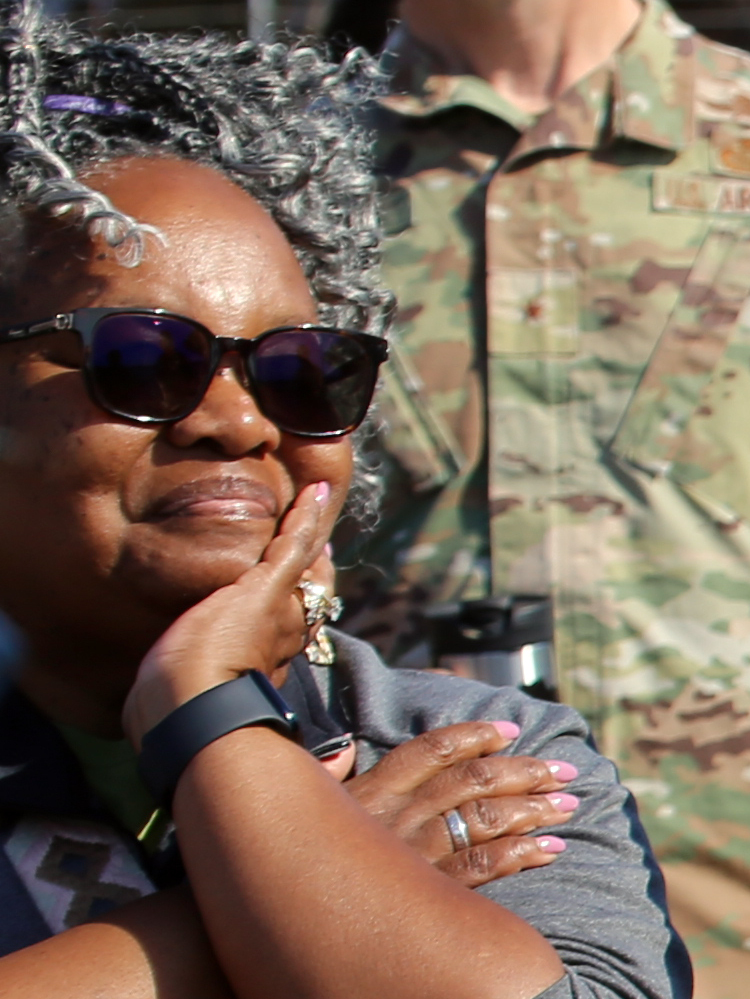
- Entenman in 2024

Member of the Washington House of Representatives from the 47th district
- Incumbent
- Assumed office January 14, 2019 Serving with Chris Stearns
- Preceded by: Mark Hargrove

Personal details
- Born: Debra Jean Rivers; November 27, 1961 (age 64) Seattle, Washington, U.S.
- Party: Democratic
- Spouse: Dave
- Education: Seattle University (BA)

Debra Jean Entenman (née Rivers, born November 27, 1961) is an American politician who is the member of the Washington House of Representatives from the 47th district in King County.

== Early life and career ==
Entenman earned an AA from Highline Community College in 2001. She earned a BA in political science from Seattle University in 2003. She worked for the Children’s Alliance and worked for Congressman Adam Smith for 12 years, including service as his District Director. In 2015, Washington Governor Jay Inslee appointed Entenman to serve as a Trustee at Renton Technical College.

== Political career ==
=== Election ===
Entenman was elected in the general election on November 6, 2018, winning 53 percent of the vote over 46 percent of Republican incumbent Mark Hargrove.
