= Tina Orwall =

American politician (born 1965)

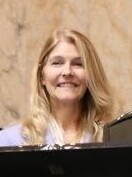
- Orwall in 2023

Member of the Washington State Senate from the 33rd district
- Incumbent
- Assumed office December 10, 2024
- Preceded by: Karen Keiser

Speaker pro tempore of the Washington House of Representatives
- In office January 11, 2021 – December 10, 2024
- Preceded by: John Lovick
- Succeeded by: Chris Stearns
- In office January 9, 2017 – January 8, 2018
- Preceded by: Jim Moeller
- Succeeded by: John Lovick

Member of the Washington House of Representatives from the 33rd district
- In office January 12, 2009 – December 10, 2024
- Preceded by: Shay Schual-Berke
- Succeeded by: Edwin Obras

Personal details
- Born: Tina Louise Orwall; April 3, 1965 (age 61) Florida, U.S.
- Party: Democratic
- Education: University of Washington (BS, MSW)

Tina Louise Orwall (born April 3, 1965) is an American politician who serves as a Democratic member of the Washington State Senate, representing the State's 33rd Legislative District. She was a member of the Washington House of Representatives from 2009 to 2024, when she was appointed to the Senate seat. Orwall previously served as the Speaker pro tempore of the Washington House of Representatives from 2017 to 2018 and from 2021 to 2024.

== Early life ==
Orwall was born in Florida. She graduated from Oak Harbor High School in 1983. In 1988, she graduated from the University of Washington with a Bachelor of Science Degree of Psychology and immediately went on to complete her Master of Social Work in Administration.

== Career ==
Orwall primarily worked as a clinical social worker focused on serving people with mental illness.

Orwall also worked for the City of Seattle Office of Housing as coordinator for the Washington State Taking Health Care Home Grant, where she convened a Funders Group to coordinate funding between housing and service entities, resulting in the creation of 1,000 units of Housing First, low barrier housing for individuals who were chronically homeless.

Orwall later worked for King County and Pierce County governments and was active in governmental partnerships, including the Washington State Policy Academy on Co-Occurring Disorders, the King County Veteran’s Group Consortium Steering Committee, and the Supportive Housing Alliance for Veterans (SHAVET).

Washington House of Representatives
Preceded by Jim Moeller	Speaker pro tempore of the Washington House of Representatives; 2017–2018	Succeeded by John Lovick
Preceded by John Lovick	Speaker pro tempore of the Washington House of Representatives; 2021–2024	Succeeded by Chris Stearns
