= Stephanie McClintock =

American politician

Member of the Washington House of Representatives from the 18th district
- Incumbent
- Assumed office January 9, 2023 Serving with John Ley
- Preceded by: Brandon Vick
- Succeeded by: Randi Knott (elect)

Personal details
- Party: Republican
- Education: BA Concordia University
- Website: https://stephaniemcclintock.houserepublicans.wa.gov

Stephanie McClintock (born c. 1980) is an American politician who is currently serving in the Washington House of Representatives in the 18th district (Position 1). She served on the Battle Ground School Board from 2013-2017.

Washington House of Representatives
Preceded by Brandon Vick	Member of the Washington House of Representatives from the 18th district, Position 1; 2023–present	Incumbent
