= Dan Bronoske =

American firefighter & politician (born 1980)

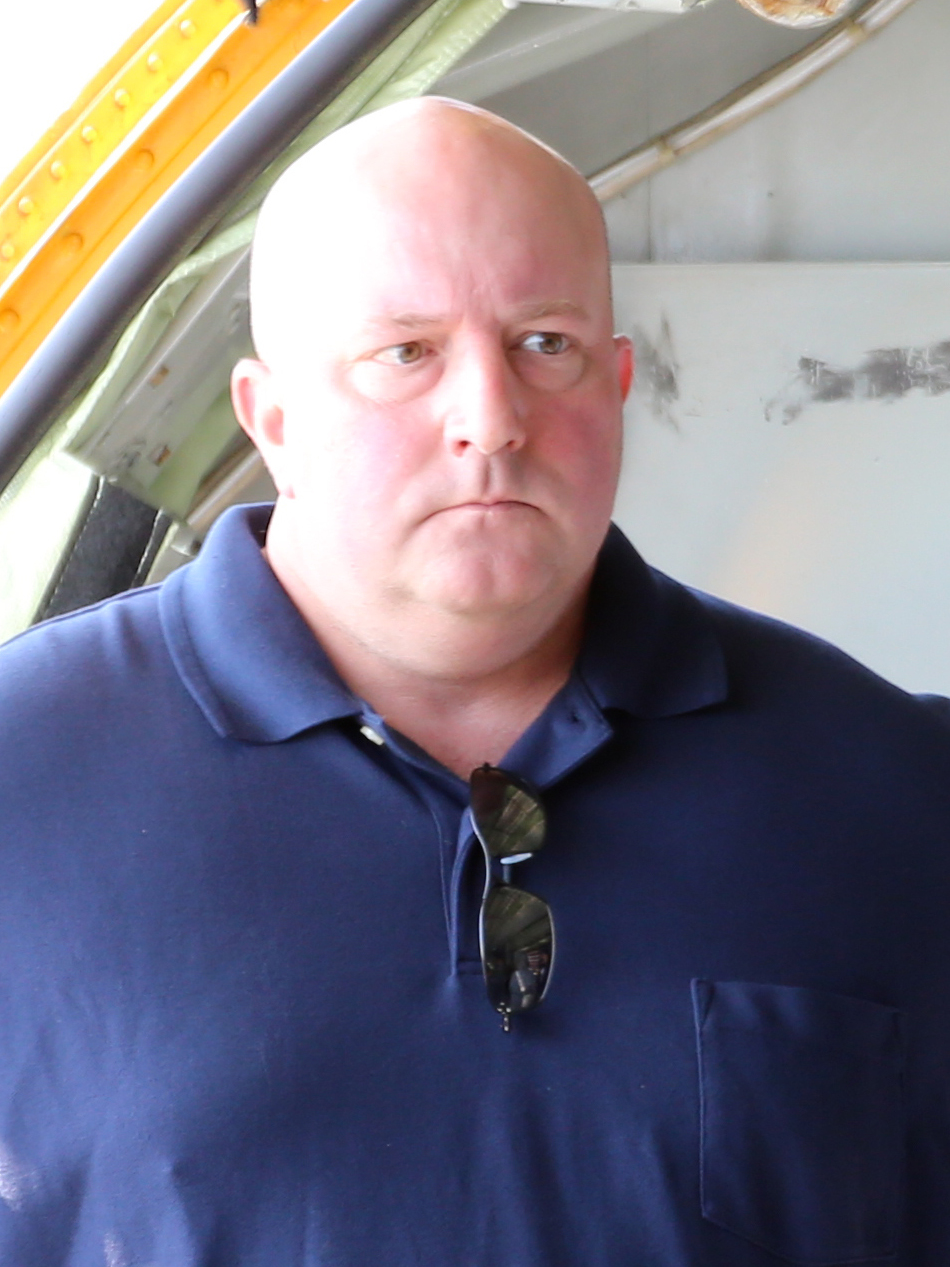

Member of the Washington House of Representatives from the 28th district
- Incumbent
- Assumed office January 11, 2021 Serving with Mari Leavitt
- Preceded by: Christine Kilduff

Personal details
- Born: Daniel Allen Bronoske; February 1980 (age 46) Pierce County, Washington, U.S.
- Party: Democratic
- Education: Eastern Oregon University (BS); University of Washington (MPA)

Daniel Allen Bronoske (born February 1980) is an American firefighter and politician of the Democratic Party. In 2020, he was elected to the Washington House of Representatives to represent the 28th legislative district and took office on January 11, 2021.

== Notable legislation ==
Bronoske voted in favor of HB 1589, which is described as supporting Washington's clean energy economy and transitioning to a clean, affordable, and reliable energy future by prohibiting the expansion of natural gas services and other regulations on natural gas companies.

Bronoske voted in favor of HB 1054, which is described as establishing requirements for tactics and equipment used by peace officers by adding restrictions on vehicular pursuits, as well as prohibiting law enforcement from using chokeholds, the deployment of tear gas, or unleashed police dogs in the arrest or apprehension of suspects.
