= Tarra Simmons =

American politician from Washington

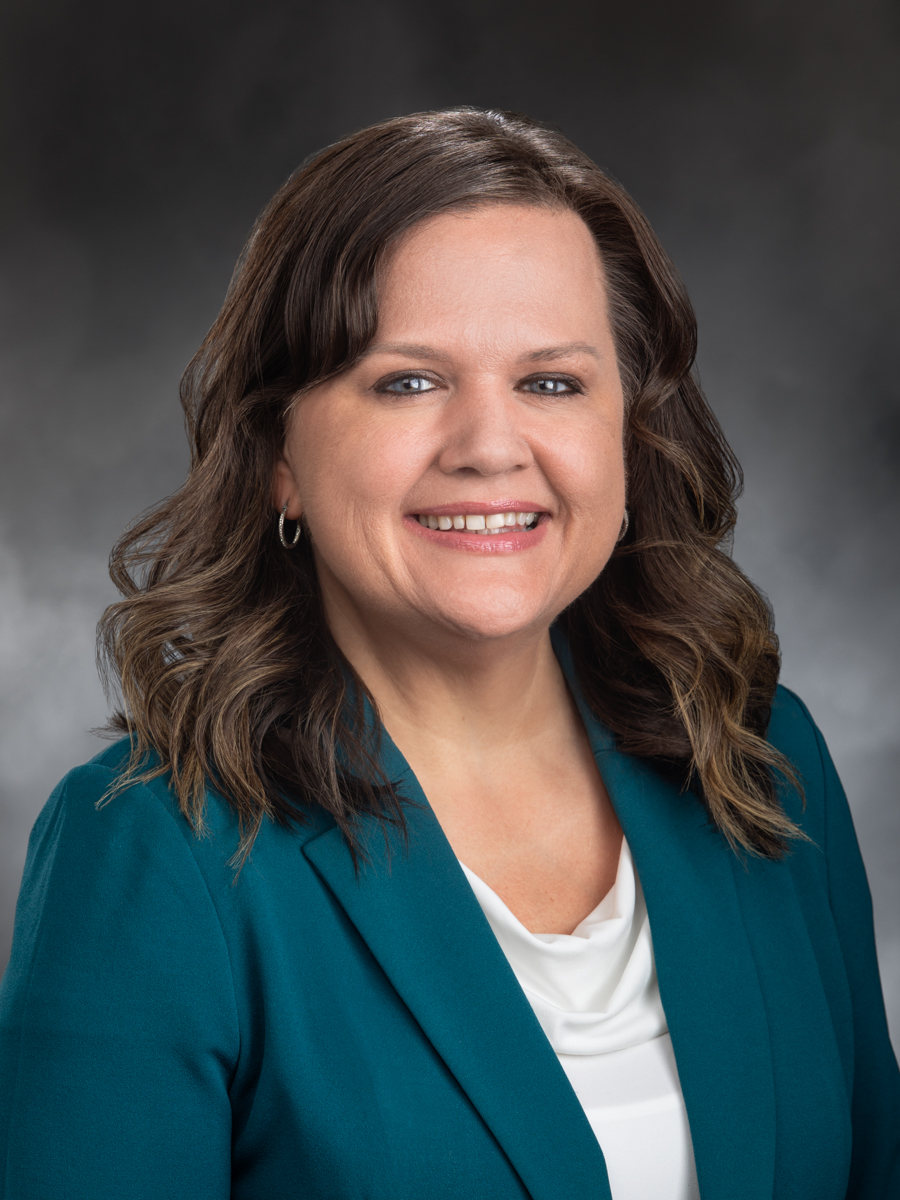
- Tarra Simmons

Member of the Washington House of Representatives from the 23rd district
- Incumbent
- Assumed office January 11, 2021 Serving with Greg Nance
- Preceded by: Sherry Appleton

Personal details
- Born: Tarra Denelle Simmons; 1977 (age 48–49) Olympia, Washington, U.S.
- Party: Democratic
- Children: 2
- Education: Olympic College (AA); Pacific Lutheran University (BS); Seattle University (JD)
- Known for: Being formerly incarcerated and winning Washington Supreme Court case to sit for the Washington State Bar Association exam

Tarra Denelle Simmons (born 1977) is an American politician, lawyer, former registered nurse, formerly incarcerated individual, and civil rights activist for criminal justice reform. Simmons is notable for being the first legislator in Washington state to have felony convictions.

== Education ==
Simmons earned a degree in Bachelor of Science in Nursing from Pacific Lutheran University in 2000. She graduated from Seattle University School of Law magna cum laude in 2017. After earning her Juris Doctor, Simmons received the Skadden Fellowship and was named National Law Student of the year by National Jurist. The Skadden Fellowship funded her work to "provide civil [legal] assistance in Kitsap County to low-income people recently released from incarceration." According to the Kitsap Sun, Simmons was the first Seattle University School of Law student to receive the award and the first formerly incarcerated individual to receive the award.

== Advocacy ==
Simmons was initially denied her application to sit for the Washington State bar exam due to her status as a convicted felon. She challenged the Washington State Bar Association rules in the Washington State Supreme Court and won, with the court unanimously ruling in her favor. She was later sworn in as an attorney in the State of Washington on June 16, 2018.

Simmons has previously been appointed by former Governor Jay Inslee to serve on the Statewide Re-Entry Council, which she co-chaired with former King County Prosecutor Dan Satterberg. Her advocacy has earned her recognition by United States Senator Patty Murray, the YWCA of Kitsap County, the Washington Association of Criminal Defense Lawyers and the National Alliance on Mental Illness.

Previous to serving in the Legislature, Simmons' advocacy led to the adoption of the New Hope Act, a bipartisan law streamlining reintegration after incarceration.

== Professional career ==
Simmons is an attorney in private practice and has formerly worked as a registered nurse. She previously served as a legal intern for the Public Defenders Association.

From 2015 to 2024, Simmons was the founding director of Civil Survival, a nonprofit focused on assisting the formerly incarcerated. In July 2024, Simmons left the organization, alleging discrimination and retaliation in a wrongful termination lawsuit. Civil Survival responded to the report by claiming that Simmons created a hostile working environment. The litigation was settled in September 2025 for an undisclosed amount.

== Political career ==
In 2020, Simmons was elected to the Washington House of Representatives for District 23-Position 1. Her victory is believed to be the first legislative race to be won by a formerly incarcerated individual in the nation. As of the conclusion of the 2026 Legislative Session, Simmons serves on the committees for Community Safety, Health Care and Wellness, Technology, Economic Development and Veterans, and Rules. She also serves as the Vice Chair for the Community Safety, Justice, & Reentry Committee and as the Deputy Speaker Pro Tempore. Simmons was re-elected in 2022 and 2024. She is currently running for re-election for a fourth term and advanced past the August 2026 Primary with approximately 59% of the vote, about 20-points ahead of her only challenger.

In the Legislature, Simmons' work has focused on improving affordability, expanding access to health care, mental health services, voting rights, behavioral health and improving reentry and rehabilitation services for formerly incarcerated individuals. She has sponsored legislation, subsequently adopted into law, that strengthens hospital charity care requirements, reforms the prior authorization process of insurance companies, requires insurers to cover mental health and substance abuse disorders at the same level as all other medical care, restore the right to vote immediately upon release from incarceration and reform how Washington State assesses and collects conviction-related fines. She also has sponsored legislation that led to the creation of the state’s Independent Office of Behavioral Health Consumer Advocacy, expanding reentry services for people leaving incarceration and invested in improving healthcare nursing standards and workforce shortages in underserved communities.

Simmons has also advocated for police accountability, transparency and immigrant protections. In 2026, she sponsored bills to prohibit state and local law enforcement from hiring any previously sworn ICE officers on or after January 20, 2025. She also has sponsored legislation to establish a court-supervised appeals process for officers placed on a prosecutor’s Brady List and to create statewide standards requiring officers' usage of body cameras. While not successful, she sponsored legislation that would have reformed resentencing processes and guidelines. During the legislative process concerning the creation of a new tax in Washington State on income above $1,000,000, Simmons worked to remove a corporate tax break from the legislation and include more tax relief for working families. She has also secured over $100 million in capital budget investments across her district, focusing on affordable housing and land conservation projects.

In 2025, the Legislative Ethics Board of Washington State received a complaint alleging that Simmons had used her elected position for personal benefit. That complaint was discussed in a public hearing held by the Ethics Board. Following the hearing, the Legislative Ethics Board levied the maximum civil penalty of $15,000 for three violations and dismissed three other allegations and ordered Simmons to pay the state's legal costs. Simmons is pursuing an appeal in Thurston County Superior Court. In 2026, a separate complaint was filed against her campaign by a donor to her political opponent to the state's Public Disclosure Commission for allegedly making an inappropriate donation to a non-profit using campaign funds. That complaint was resolved by the Public Disclosure Commission, which found it to be a minor technical compliance error for which Simmons received no personal benefit. The same complaintant filed an allegation on another matter to the Ethics Board, which was also dismissed in August 2026.

== Personal life ==
Simmons grew up in Bremerton, WA. She has two children. A formerly incarcerated individual who has experienced homelessness, she served 20 months in prison from 2011 to 2013 after being convicted in Kitsap Superior Court of drug and theft charges. She is in recovery for substance abuse. Her felony convictions were vacated in 2023.
