= Peter Abbarno =

American attorney, businessman, and politician

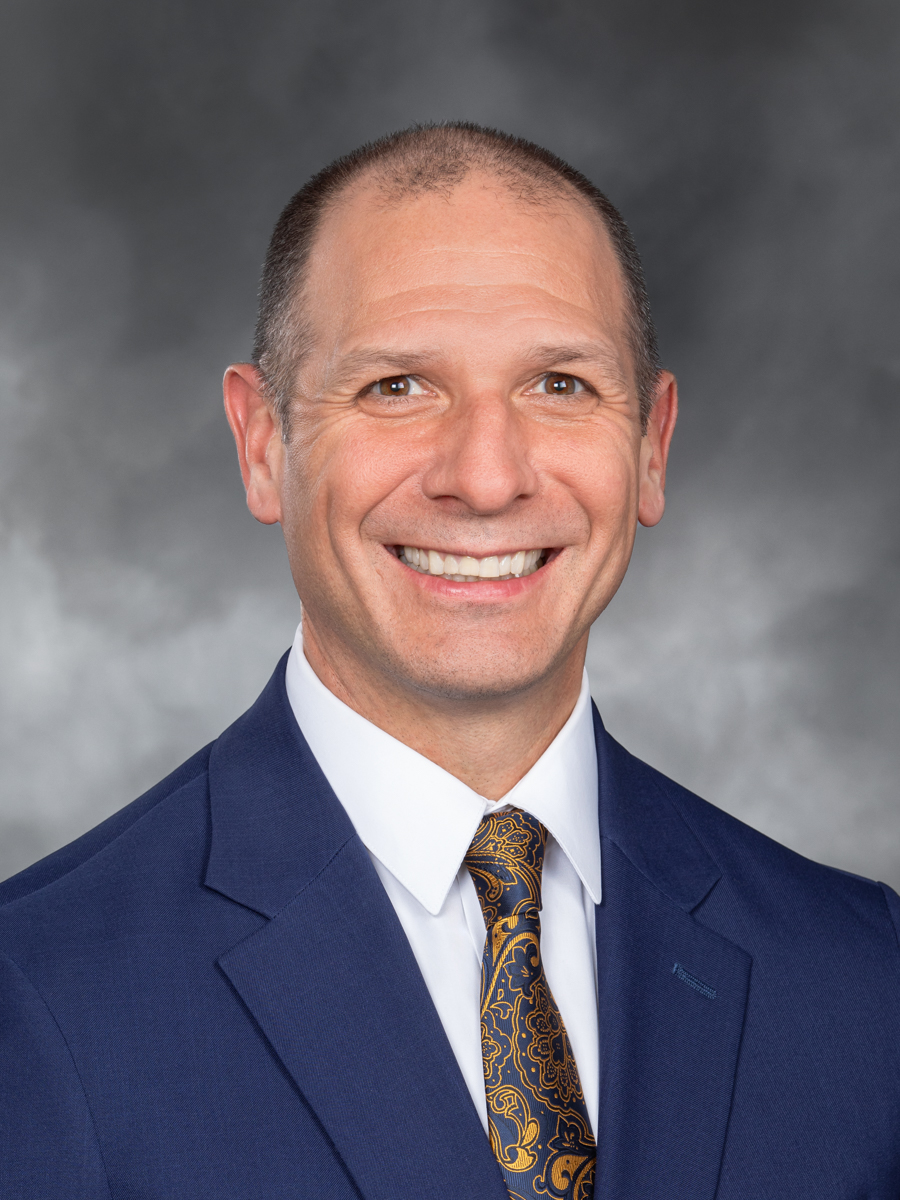

Member of the Washington House of Representatives from the 20th district
- Incumbent
- Assumed office January 11, 2021 Serving with Ed Orcutt
- Preceded by: Richard DeBolt

Personal details
- Born: Peter Jaret Abbarno; September 24, 1975 (age 50) Buffalo, New York, U.S.
- Party: Republican
- Spouse: Holly Abbarno
- Children: 2
- Occupation: Attorney, businessman, and politician

Peter Jaret Abbarno (born September 24, 1975) is an American attorney, businessman, and politician from Washington. He is a Republican member of Washington House of Representatives for District 20. Abbarno took office on January 11, 2021.

== Education ==
In 1997, Abbarno earned a Bachelor of Arts degree in political science from State University of New York at Fredonia. In 2008, Abbarno earned a Juris Doctor degree from Vermont Law School. In 2009, Abbarno earned a master's degree in Laws in taxation from the University of Washington.

== Career ==
Abbarno was a deputy assistant prosecuting attorney in King County Juvenile Court. In 2010, Abbarno joined the law firm of Olson Althauser Samuelson and Rayan (aka Althauser Rayan Abbarno, LLP) in Centralia, Washington.

In 2015, Abbarno was elected to the Centralia City Council.

On November 3, 2020, Abbarno won the election and became a Republican member of Washington House of Representatives for District 20, Position 1. Abbarno defeated Timothy Zahn with 70.84% of the votes.

=== Legislation ===
Abbarno twice introduced House Bill 1004, known as Zack's Law. The bill requires the state to post warnings of the dangers of jumping from bridges and subsequent drowning hazards, with particular outreach to provide information regarding cold water shock. The law was named after Zachary Lee Rager, an experienced swimmer who perished from cold water shock while jumping into the Chehalis River from a trestle bridge on the Willapa Hills Trail. The legislature unanimously passed the bill in 2023 by a vote of 95–0. The law also stipulates that a memorial sign about Rager be placed near the bridge where his death occurred.

== Awards ==
- 2019 Person of the Year. Presented by The Chronicle.
- 2021 Legislator of the Year. Presented by The Washington Association of Agricultural Educators.

== Personal life ==
Abbarno's wife is Holly Abbarno. They have two children. Abbarno and his family live in Centralia, Washington.
