= Steve Tharinger =

American politician

Member of the Washington House of Representatives from the 24th district
- Incumbent
- Assumed office January 10, 2011 Serving with Adam Bernbaum
- Preceded by: Lynn Kessler

Clallam County Commissioner
- In office January 1, 2000 – January 1, 2012
- Preceded by: Martha M. Ireland
- Succeeded by: Jim McEntire

Personal details
- Born: Stephen Platner Tharinger; 1949 (age 76–77) Wisconsin, U.S.
- Party: Democratic
- Education: Colorado College (BA)

Stephen Platner Tharinger (born 1949) is an American politician of the Democratic Party. He is a member of the Washington House of Representatives, representing the 24th district.

== Notable legislation ==
Tharinger voted in favor of HB 1054, which is described as establishing requirements for tactics and equipment used by peace officers by adding restrictions on vehicular pursuits, as well as prohibiting law enforcement from using chokeholds, the deployment of tear gas, or unleashed police dogs in the arrest or apprehension of suspects.
