= Alicia Rule =

American politician (born 1976)

Member of the Washington House of Representatives from the 42nd district
- Incumbent
- Assumed office January 11, 2021 Serving with Joe Timmons
- Preceded by: Luanne Van Werven

Personal details
- Born: Alicia Jayne Rule; 1976 (age 49–50) Bellingham, Washington, U.S.
- Party: Democratic

Alicia Jayne Rule (born 1976) is an American politician of the Democratic Party. In 2020, she was elected to the Washington House of Representatives to represent the 42nd legislative district and took office on January 11, 2021.

Rule previously served on the Blaine City Council and was re-elected to the legislature in 2022.
