= Larry Springer =

American politician (born 1947)

Member of the Washington House of Representatives from the 45th district
- Incumbent
- Assumed office January 10, 2005 Serving with Roger Goodman
- Preceded by: Laura Ruderman

Personal details
- Born: Lawrence Stanley Springer; January 30, 1947 (age 79) Snoqualmie, Washington, U.S.
- Party: Democratic
- Spouse: Penny Sweet
- Education: Western Washington University (BA); University of Oregon (MS)
- Occupation: Educator, wine shop owner

Lawrence Stanley Springer (born January 30, 1947) is a Democratic member of the Washington House of Representatives, representing the 45th district since 2005. He currently serves as the Deputy Majority Leader. Springer was the mayor of Kirkland from 2000 to 2003 and served on the Kirkland City Council from 1994 to 2004.

Springer began his career as a school teacher, and then opened a wine store in Kirkland. Following his experience as a small business owner, Springer became involved in the local community and eventually went into local politics. Among other things, he is a member of the Kirkland Chamber of Commerce and served as President of the Suburban Cities Association. He received the National Distinguished Leadership Award.

In April 2026, he announced he would not seek reelection.
