= Renton Technical College =

Coordinates: 47°29′30″N 122°10′34″W

- Former names: Renton Vocational-Technical Institute
- Motto: Education for Life
- Type: Public community college
- Established: 1941
- President: Yoshiko Harden
- Total staff: 540 (2023)
- Students: 3,200 (2023)
- Location: Renton, Washington, United States
- Campus: Suburban
- Website: www.rtc.edu

Renton Technical College (Renton Tech or RTC) is a public community college in Renton, Washington. The college offers bachelor's degrees, associate degrees and certificates of completion in professional-technical fields. As of June 2023, the college had over 3,200 students, 81 full-time faculty members, 238 part-time faculty members, and 221 other staff member.

== History ==
In 1941, Renton Technical College came into existence as a war production school. Throughout the duration of World War II, the college provided customized pre-employment training and job upgrading-retraining.

After the war, the college became a state-funded vocational school with the mission of assisting industry in converting from a war-time to a peace-time economy. For the next 20 years, the college conducted a large number of upgrading-retraining classes and a small number of high quality training programs.

In 1965, the college moved to a central campus comprising three new buildings. For the next five years, the basis of the specialized College was laid with its emphasis on open-entry, open-exit, and continuous progress instruction based on achievement of measurable competencies.

Since 1971, the college has grown to nearly 400,000 square feet and the student body has increased 500 percent. The original three buildings have been remodeled and expanded, 10 new structures have been built, four portables have been added, and the college has acquired numerous off-campus facilities. The growth of the central campus has enabled the college to improve and expand training in the growing industries of health, service, and information technology – especially those fields that are affected by new technologies. The college continues to provide customized training and services to Puget Sound-area businesses.

The second 50 years, beginning in 1991, were marked by the conversion of the state's vocational-technical institutes to technical colleges. As part of this change, governance was shifted to the State Board for Community and Technical Colleges and authorization was given to grant two year, sub-baccalaureate degrees and certificates of completion. Degrees are awarded in 36 preparatory programs, in apprenticeship and through three general occupational degree programs. Certificates are currently provided in 80 programs.

== Academics ==
The college has full-time and part-time professional-technical programs that are divided into areas of study:

- Automotive
- Business Technology
- Construction and Building Technology
- Culinary Careers
- Education and Human Services
- (Allied) Health Careers
- Manufacturing and Product Service Technology
- Technology
- Ford ASSET Program

The college also offers General Education courses necessary to complete the associate's degree requirements.

== Accreditation ==
Renton Technical College is accredited by the Northwest Commission on Colleges and Universities (NWCCU)
