= Roger Goodman (politician) =

American lawyer and politician from Washington

Member of the Washington House of Representatives from the 45th district
- Incumbent
- Assumed office January 8, 2007 Serving with Larry Springer
- Preceded by: Toby Nixon

Personal details
- Born: Roger Elliot Goodman; 1961 (age 64–65) Rhode Island, U.S.
- Party: Democratic
- Education: Dartmouth College (BA); Harvard University (MPA); George Washington University (JD)
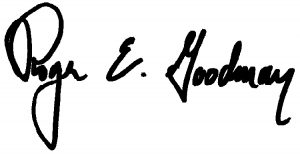
- Signature

Roger Elliot Goodman (born 1961) is an American lawyer and politician serving as a Democratic member of the Washington House of Representatives, representing the 45th district since 2007. Goodman won re-election in 2012 against Republican Joel Hussey. Goodman has been described by the Seattle Times as "progressive."

== Education ==
Goodman earned an A.B degree from Dartmouth College, A.B. in 1983 and three years later he was awarded a J.D. from The George Washington University. Goodman also attended Harvard University where he received his M.P.A. (Kennedy School of Government) in 1998.

== Legislative career ==
Goodman is the Vice Chair of the House Judiciary Committee and serves on the Public Safety and Emergency Preparedness and Early Learning and Children's Services Committees. He is also a member of the Law and Justice Committee of the National Conference of State Legislatures and serves on the Public Safety Task Force of the Council of State Governments.

Goodman is recognized as a leader on public safety issues, who has received numerous awards for his work on keeping Washington State roadways safe. Goodman has worked with the Washington State law enforcement community on HB 3254 and HB 2131 to strengthen state DUI laws. Goodman was named Outstanding Legislator of the Year by the Washington Association of Substance and Violence Prevention.

Goodman helped lead efforts to create a four-year program at the Duvall campus of Lake Washington Institute of Technology.

== Accusations of driving under the influence ==
According to divorce filings and text messages handed over to the Seattle Times from Goodman's ex-wife, Roger Goodman drove their two young children while under the influence of marijuana. Goodman has denied the claims. The claims made by Goodman's ex-wife became a point of political ads run against the state representative during his campaign for re-election in 2014.

== Personal ==
He is Jewish.
