= Chris Stearns =

American politician from Washington state

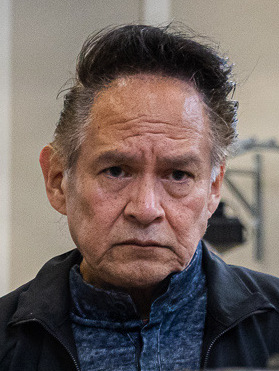
- Stearns in 2026

Speaker pro tempore of the Washington House of Representatives
- Incumbent
- Assumed office January 13, 2025
- Preceded by: Tina Orwall

Member of the Washington House of Representatives from the 47th district
- Incumbent
- Assumed office December 1, 2022 Serving with Debra Entenman
- Preceded by: Pat Sullivan

Personal details
- Party: Democratic
- Education: Williams College (BA); Cornell University (JD)

Chris Stearns is an American politician who is a Democratic member of the Washington Legislature representing the State's 47th House district for position 2. He is a member of the Navajo nation. Before serving in the legislature, Stearns was the first tribal member to serve on the Auburn City Council.

== Early life and career ==
Sterns graduated from Lawrenceville School. He earned a B.A. with honors in history from Williams College. He graduated with a Juris Doctor degree from Cornell Law School.

President Bill Clinton appointed Stearns as director of Indian affairs for the U.S. Department of Energy under Secretary Bill Richardson. Stearns served as chair of the Washington State Gambling Commission and a member of the City of Seattle's Human Rights Commission. He also served as president of the Seattle Indian Health Board.

Stearns was elected to the Auburn City Council in 2019. He stepped down from this position in December 2022, after being elected to the state House.

== Elections ==
November 2022 State Representative Position 2 General election
Party	Candidate	Votes	%
Democratic	Chris Stearns	27,057	63.73
Democratic	Shukri Olow	13,196	31.08

Washington House of Representatives
Preceded by Tina Orwall	Speaker pro tempore of the Washington House of Representatives; 2025–present	Incumbent
