= Laurie Jinkins =

American politician from Washington

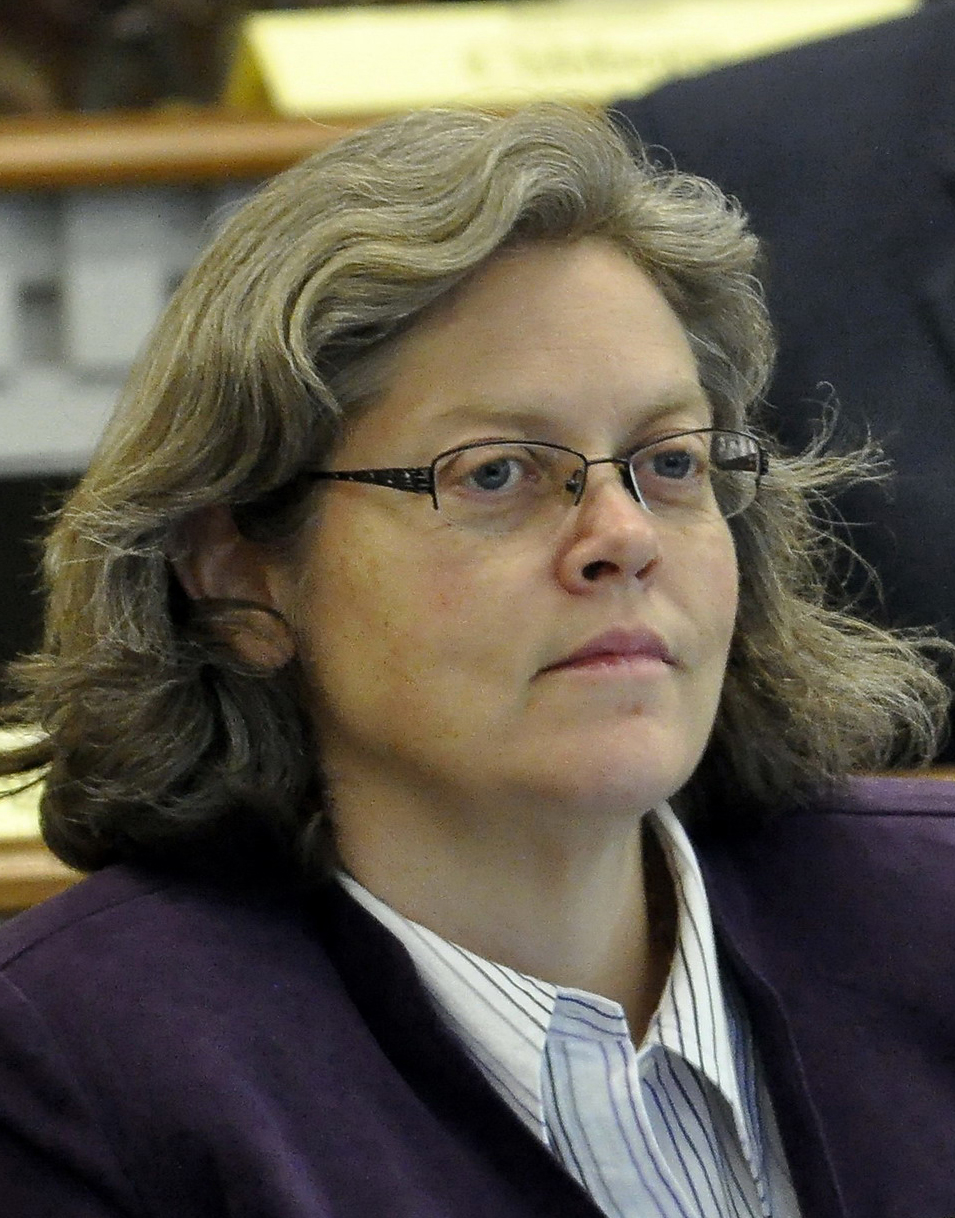

Speaker of the Washington House of Representatives
- Incumbent
- Assumed office January 13, 2020
- Preceded by: John Lovick (acting)

Member of the Washington House of Representatives from the 27th district
- Incumbent
- Assumed office January 10, 2011 Serving with Jake Fey
- Preceded by: Dennis Flannigan

Personal details
- Born: August 1964 (age 62) Iowa, U.S.
- Party: Democratic
- Spouse: Laura Wulf (m. 2013)
- Children: 1
- Education: University of Wisconsin, Madison (BS, MS); Seattle University School of Law (JD)
- Website: Official website

Laurie A. Jinkins (born August 1964) is an American politician, attorney, and public health official from Tacoma, Washington who serves as a member of the Washington House of Representatives from the 27th district. A Democrat, she has served as Speaker of the House since January 2020.

== Early life and education ==
Jinkins grew up in the rural Midwest and attended the University of Wisconsin–Madison, where she earned both bachelor's and master's degrees. She moved to Washington State in 1987 to attend the University of Puget Sound School of Law (now affiliated with Seattle University), earning a Juris Doctor (J.D.) in 1990. In 2007, she completed the Senior Executives in State and Local Government program at Harvard University's John F. Kennedy School of Government.

== Career ==
After graduation, she worked as an assistant attorney general in Tacoma, before joining the Washington State Department of Health in Olympia in 1995. She remained at the department until 2008, rising to the post of assistant secretary. In 2008, she joined the Tacoma–Pierce County Health Department as deputy director.

=== Politics ===
Jinkins has a long record of involvement in civic, government and political organizations. From 1990 to 1992, she chaired the Tacoma Hate Crimes Task Force, later chairing the Tacoma Charter Review Committee and the Tacoma Community College Board of Trustees. In 2009, she led the successful statewide campaign to approve Referendum 71, affirming Washington's domestic partnership law.

When Rep. Dennis Flannigan (D–Tacoma) decided against seeking re-election to the Washington House in 2010, Jinkins announced her candidacy for the seat. Four Democrats and one independent filed for the open seat with a top two primary held on August 17, 2010. Jinkins was the top vote getter in the primary with fellow Democrat Jake Fey, a member of Tacoma City Council, finishing second. In the general election held on November 2, Jinkins defeated Fey 54–46%.

On July 31, 2019, the House Democratic Caucus selected Rep. Jinkins as the new State House of Representatives Speaker-designate. She replaced Interim Speaker John Lovick, who took over upon the end of former speaker Frank Chopp's term. Jinkins is the first female and first LGBTQ speaker in Washington State history.

== Personal life ==
Jinkins is openly gay. She and her wife, Laura Wulf, have one son. She is the first openly lesbian member of the Washington State Legislature.

Political offices
Preceded by John Lovick; Acting	Speaker of the Washington House of Representatives; 2020–present	Incumbent
