= Joe Fitzgibbon =

American politician (born 1986)

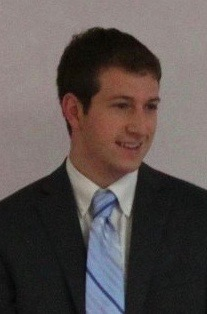

Majority Leader of the Washington House of Representatives
- Incumbent
- Assumed office November 21, 2022
- Preceded by: Pat Sullivan

Member of the Washington House of Representatives from the 34th district
- Incumbent
- Assumed office December 2, 2010 Serving with Brianna Thomas
- Preceded by: Sharon Nelson

Personal details
- Born: Joseph Clark Fitzgibbon; August 27, 1986 (age 40) Kirkland, Washington, U.S.
- Party: Democratic
- Education: Principia College (BA)
- Website: Official website

Joseph Clark Fitzgibbon (born August 27, 1986) is an American politician of the Democratic Party. He is a member of the Washington House of Representatives, representing the 34th district since 2010.

Fitzgibbon has been chair of the House Environment and Energy Committee since 2015. In early 2023, Fitzgibbon expressed his opposition to broad tax relief. He has championed several major bills to fight climate change, including the Clean Energy Transformation Act, requiring 100% clean energy in Washington; the low-carbon fuel standard; and the Climate Commitment Act, which intends to reduce carbon emissions with an emissions trading system, although Fitzgibbon stated there are not mechanisms to track whether the revenue raised by the legislation is spent effectively. In late 2024, Fitzgibbon blamed the state's budget issues on rising costs.

Washington House of Representatives
Preceded by Pat Sullivan	Majority Leader of the Washington House of Representatives; 2022–present	Incumbent
