= Skyler Rude =

American politician

Member of the Washington House of Representatives from the 16th district
- In office January 14, 2019 – October 31, 2026
- Preceded by: Terry Nealey
- Succeeded by: Vacant

Personal details
- Born: Skyler David Rude; 1986 (age 39–40) Walla Walla, Washington, U.S
- Party: Republican
- Education: Walla Walla Community College; Western Governors University
- Profession: politician, insurance agent
- Website: Legislative website

Skyler David Rude (born 1986) is an American politician. A Republican, he served in the Washington House of Representatives from 2019 to 2026. He was elected in 2018 to succeed retiring Republican Terry Nealey. While serving, Rude was the only openly gay Republican in the Washington State House.

== Career ==
Rude is regarded as a moderate and bipartisan Republican, identifying as a fiscal conservative. He serves on a number of committees, including the Legislative Evaluation and Accountability Program Committee, Joint Higher Education Committee, Joint Task Force on Community and Technical College Counselors, the Capitol Furnishings Preservation Committee, the LGBTQ Commission, and the National Conference of State Legislature's Nuclear Legislative Working Group. He has also been appointed to serve on an internal task force tasked with exploring remote-testimony for committee hearings in the state House."

In 2019, Rude co-sponsored House Resolution 4621 which encourages the state House to pursue a remote-testimony pilot program, as well as directs the Executive Rules Committee to take up the matter by Oct. 1, 2019.

Rude resigned from the Washington House in October 2026 in order to take a position under Washington Secretary of State Steve Hobbs.

== Awards ==
- 2020 Guardians of Small Business. Presented by NFIB.

== Personal life ==
Previous to being a state representative, he was on the Walla Walla Parks and Recreation Advisory Board and College Place. He was Senator Maureen Walsh's legislative assistant and advocated for sexual harassment prevention. He is openly gay.
