= Chris Corry =

American politician and businessman

Member of the Washington House of Representatives
- Incumbent
- Assumed office January 14, 2019 Serving with Jeremie Dufault
- Preceded by: Norm Johnson
- Constituency: 15th (2025–present); 14th (2019–2025)

Personal details
- Born: 1982 (age 43–44) California, U.S.
- Party: Republican
- Children: 5
- Education: University of Washington (BA)

Chris Corry (born 1982) is an American politician and businessman serving as a member of the Washington House of Representatives from the 15th district, which includes portions of Yakima County, Washington.

== Education ==
Corry earned a Bachelor of Arts degree in political science from the University of Washington.

== Career ==
After graduating from college, Corry moved to Southern California, where he met his wife, Jennica. The two eventually moved to Yakima, Washington, Jennica's hometown. Corry has worked as a risk management advisor and in the insurance industry. Elected in 2018, Corry assumed office on January 14, 2019.
