= Washington's 47th legislative district =

American legislative district

Coordinates: 47°22′N 122°10′W

Map of Washington's 47th legislative district

Washington's 47th legislative district is one of forty-nine districts in Washington state for representation in the state legislature. The district is in the southeastern King County suburbs of Seattle and includes all of Covington as well as portions of Auburn and Kent. It is a swing district that has elected both Democrats and Republicans to the state legislature.

As of 2023, the district's legislators are state senator Claudia Kauffman and state representatives Debra Entenman (position 1) and Chris Stearns (position 2), all Democrats.

== See also ==
- Washington Redistricting Commission
- Washington State Legislature
- Washington State Senate
- Washington House of Representatives
