= Washington's 18th legislative district =

American legislative district

Coordinates: 45°50′N 122°25′W

Washington's 18th legislative district map

Washington's 18th legislative district is one of forty-nine districts in Washington state for representation in the state legislature.

The district is located within Clark County, bordering the 20th district in the north, the 14th district in the east, and the 49th and 17th districts in the southwest.

The 18th district includes six of the seven incorporated cities in Clark County, including Ridgefield in the west, Battle Ground in the center, Camas and Washougal in the south, Vancouver in the southwest, and La Center and Yacolt in the north. Additionally, the district represents the residents of unincorporated Clark County localities Salmon Creek, Brush Prairie, Felida, and Hazel Dell.

This combination rural and suburban district is represented by state representatives Stephanie McClintock (position 1) and John Ley (position 2), as well as state senator Adrian Cortes; 2 are Republicans, while Cortes is a Democrat.

== See also ==
- Washington Redistricting Commission
- Washington State Legislature
- Washington State Senate
- Washington House of Representatives
