= Washington House of Representatives =

Lower house of the Washington State Legislature

Coordinates: 47°02′09″N 122°54′19″W

House of Representatives of Washington
- Washington State Legislature

Type
- Type: Lower house
- Term limits: None

History
- New session started: January 13, 2025

Leadership
- Speaker: Laurie Jinkins (D) since January 13, 2020
- Speaker pro tempore: Chris Stearns (D) since January 13, 2025
- Majority Leader: Joe Fitzgibbon (D) since November 21, 2022
- Minority Leader: Drew Stokesbary (R) since April 23, 2023

Structure
- Seats: 98
- Political groups: Majority: Democratic (59); Minority: Republican (39)
- Length of term: 2 years
- Authority: Article II, Washington State Constitution
- Salary: $72,494/year + per diem

Elections
- Last election: November 3, 2026
- Next election: November 7, 2028
- Redistricting: Washington Redistricting Commission

Meeting place
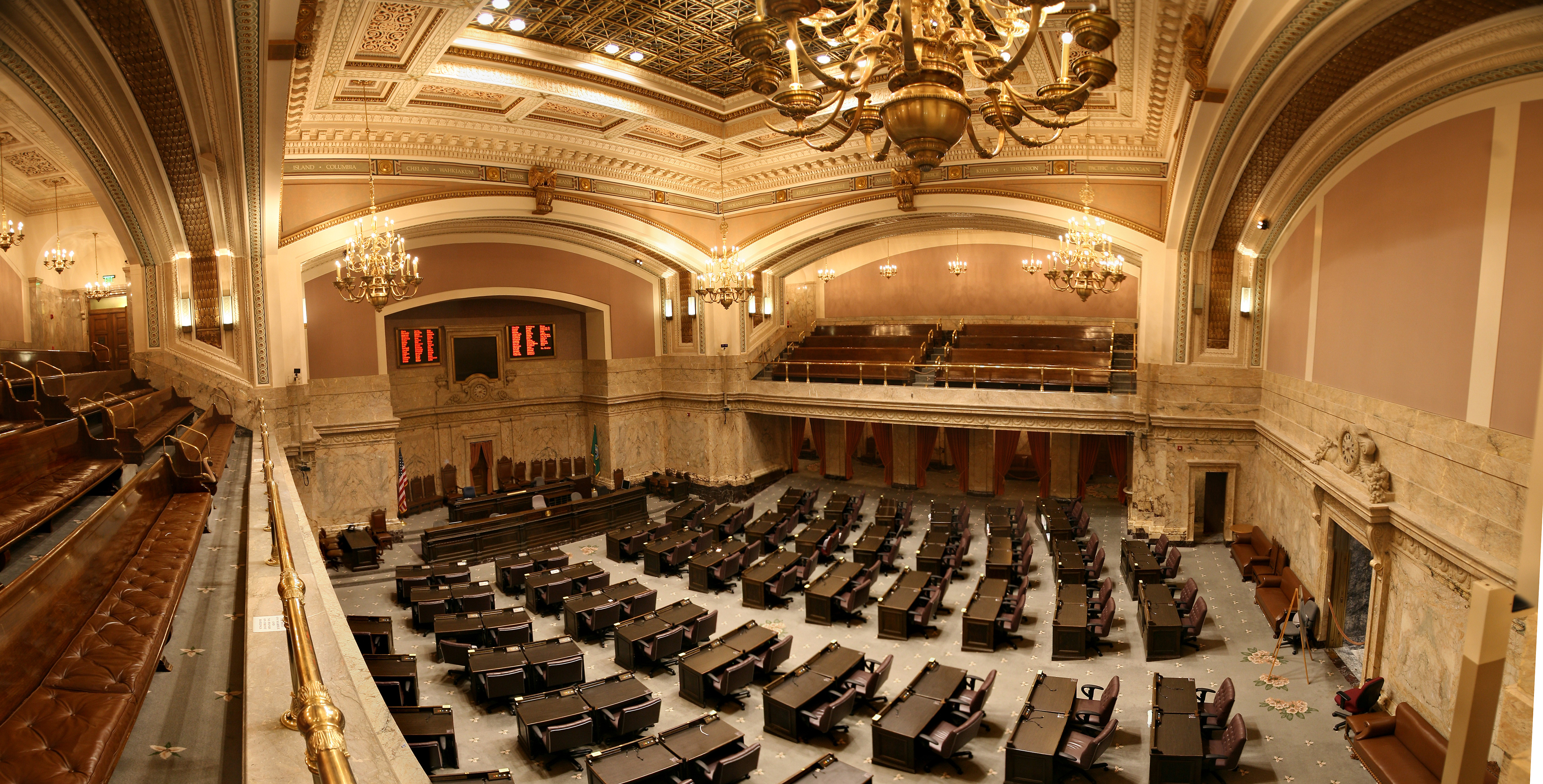
- House of Representatives Chamber; Washington State Capitol; Olympia, Washington

Website
- leg.wa.gov/house

The Washington House of Representatives is the lower house of the Washington State Legislature, and along with the Washington State Senate makes up the legislature of the U.S. state of Washington. It is composed of 98 Representatives from 49 districts, each of which elects one Senator and two members of the House. They are elected to separate positions with the top-two primary system. All members of the House are elected to a two-year term without term limits. The House meets at the State Capitol in Olympia.

== Leadership of the House of Representatives ==
The Speaker of the House presides over the House of Representatives. The Speaker and the Speaker Pro Tem are nominated by the majority party caucus followed by a vote of the full House. As well as presiding over the body, the Speaker is also the chief leadership position and controls the flow of legislation. In the absence of the Speaker the Speaker Pro Tem assumes the role of Speaker. Other House leaders, such as the majority and minority leaders, are elected by their respective party caucuses relative to their party's strength in the House.

The Speaker of the House during the first session of the 65th legislature (2019) was Democrat Frank Chopp (D-Seattle) of the 43rd Legislative District. He stepped down at the end of the session and John Lovick (D-Mill Creek) of the 44th Legislative District served as speaker pro tempore until the second session, when Laurie Jinkins (D-Tacoma) was elected speaker. The Majority Leader is Joe Fitzgibbon (D) of the 34th Legislative District. The Republican Minority Leader is Drew Stokesbary (R-Auburn) of the 31st Legislative District.

== Composition ==
Affiliation	Party (Shading indicates majority caucus)		Total	Vacant
Affiliation	Democratic	Republican	Total	Vacant
67th legislature	57	41	98	0
68th legislature	58	40	98	0
69th legislature	59	39	98	0
Latest voting share	60.2%	39.8%		

=== Members (2025–2027, 69th Legislature) ===
District	Position	Name	Party	Residence	Counties	Start
1	1	Davina Duerr	Democratic	Bothell	King (part), Snohomish (part)	2019 (Note: Originally appointed.)
1	2	Shelley Kloba	Democratic	Kirkland	King (part), Snohomish (part)	2016
2	1	Andrew Barkis	Republican	Olympia	Pierce (part), Thurston (part)	2016
2	2	Matt Marshall	Republican	Roy	Pierce (part), Thurston (part)	2024
3	1	Natasha Hill	Democratic	Spokane	Spokane (part)	2024
3	2	Timm Ormsby	Democratic	Spokane	Spokane (part)	2003
4	1	Suzanne Schmidt	Republican	Spokane Valley	Spokane (part)	2022
4	2	Rob Chase (Note: Chase previously served in the state house from 2021–2023.)	Republican	Spokane Valley	Spokane (part)	2024
5	1	Zach Hall	Democratic	Issaquah	King (part)	2025
5	2	Lisa Callan	Democratic	Issaquah	King (part)	2018
6	1	Mike Volz	Republican	Spokane	Spokane (part)	2016
6	2	Jenny Graham	Republican	Spokane	Spokane (part)	2018
7	1	Andrew Engell	Republican	Colville	Ferry, Okanogan (part), Pend Oreille, Spokane (part), Stevens	2024
7	2	Hunter Abell	Republican	Colville	Ferry, Okanogan (part), Pend Oreille, Spokane (part), Stevens	2024
8	1	Stephanie Barnard	Republican	Pasco	Benton (part)	2022
8	2	April Connors	Republican	Kennewick	Benton (part)	2022
9	1	Mary Dye	Republican	Pomeroy	Adams, Asotin, Franklin (part), Garfield, Spokane (part), Whitman	2015
9	2	Joe Schmick	Republican	Colfax	Adams, Asotin, Franklin (part), Garfield, Spokane (part), Whitman	2007
10	1	Clyde Shavers	Democratic	Oak Harbor	Island, Skagit (part), Snohomish (part)	2022
10	2	Dave Paul	Democratic	Oak Harbor	Island, Skagit (part), Snohomish (part)	2018
11	1	David Hackney	Democratic	Tukwila	King (part)	2020
11	2	Steve Bergquist	Democratic	Renton	King (part)	2012
12	1	Brian Burnett	Republican	Wenatchee	Chelan, Douglas, Grant (part), Okanogan (part)	2024
12	2	Mike Steele	Republican	Chelan	Chelan, Douglas, Grant (part), Okanogan (part)	2016
13	1	Tom Dent	Republican	Moses Lake	Grant (part), Kittitas, Lincoln, Yakima (part)	2014
13	2	Alex Ybarra	Republican	Quincy	Grant (part), Kittitas, Lincoln, Yakima (part)	2019
14	1	Gloria Mendoza	Republican	Grandview	Clark (part), Klickitat, Skamania, Yakima (part)	2024
14	2	Deb Manjarrez	Republican	Wapato	Clark (part), Klickitat, Skamania, Yakima (part)	2024
15	1	Chris Corry	Republican	Yakima	Yakima (part)	2018 (Note: Corry represented the 14th district from 2019–2025.)
15	2	Jeremie Dufault (Note: Dufault previously served in the state house from 2019–2023.)	Republican	Selah	Yakima (part)	2024
16	1	Mark Klicker	Republican	Walla Walla	Benton (part), Columbia, Franklin (part), Walla Walla	2020
16	2	Vacant (Note: Skyler Rude resigned on October 31, 2026)	Republican		Benton (part), Columbia, Franklin (part), Walla Walla	
17	1	Kevin Waters	Republican	Stevenson	Clark (part), Klickitat (part), Skamania	2022
17	2	David Stuebe	Republican	Washougal	Clark (part), Klickitat (part), Skamania	2024
18	1	Stephanie McClintock	Republican	Vancouver	Clark (part)	2022
18	2	John Ley	Republican	Hazel Dell	Clark (part)	2024
19	1	Jim Walsh	Republican	Aberdeen	Cowlitz (part), Grays Harbor (part), Lewis (part), Pacific, Wahkiakum	2016 (Note: Originally elected in a special election.)
19	2	Joel McEntire	Republican	Cathlamet	Cowlitz (part), Grays Harbor (part), Lewis (part), Pacific, Wahkiakum	2020
20	1	Peter Abbarno	Republican	Centralia	Clark (part), Cowlitz (part), Lewis (part), Thurston (part)	2020
20	2	Ed Orcutt	Republican	Kalama	Clark (part), Cowlitz (part), Lewis (part), Thurston (part)	2002 (Note: Orcutt represented the 18th district from 2002–2011.)
21	1	Strom Peterson	Democratic	Edmonds	Snohomish (part)	2014
21	2	Lillian Ortiz-Self	Democratic	Mukilteo	Snohomish (part)	2014
22	1	Beth Doglio (Note: Doglio previously served in the state house from 2017–2021.)	Democratic	Olympia	Thurston (part)	2022
22	2	Lisa Parshley	Democratic	Olympia	Thurston (part)	2020
23	1	Tarra Simmons	Democratic	East Bremerton	Kitsap (part)	2020
23	2	Greg Nance	Democratic	Bainbridge Island	Kitsap (part)	2023
24	1	Adam Bernbaum	Democratic	Port Angeles	Clallam, Grays Harbor (part), Jefferson	2024
24	2	Steve Tharinger	Democratic	Port Townsend	Clallam, Grays Harbor (part), Jefferson	2010
25	1	Michael Keaton	Republican	Puyallup	Pierce (part)	2024
25	2	Cyndy Jacobsen	Republican	Puyallup	Pierce (part)	2020
26	1	Adison Richards	Democratic	Gig Harbor	Kitsap (part), Pierce (part)	2024
26	2	Michelle Caldier	Republican	Port Orchard	Kitsap (part), Pierce (part)	2014
27	1	Laurie Jinkins	Democratic	Tacoma	Pierce (part)	2010
27	2	Jake Fey	Democratic	Tacoma	Pierce (part)	2012
28	1	Mari Leavitt	Democratic	University Place	Pierce (part)	2018
28	2	Dan Bronoske	Democratic	Lakewood	Pierce (part)	2020
29	1	Melanie Morgan	Democratic	Parkland	Pierce (part)	2018
29	2	Sharlett Mena	Democratic	Tacoma	Pierce (part)	2022
30	1	Jamila Taylor	Democratic	Federal Way	King (part), Pierce (part)	2020
30	2	Kristine Reeves (Note: Reeves previously served in the state house from 2017–2019.)	Democratic	Federal Way	King (part), Pierce (part)	2022
31	1	Drew Stokesbary	Republican	Auburn	King (part), Pierce (part)	2014
31	2	Josh Penner	Republican	Orting	King (part), Pierce (part)	2024
32	1	Cindy Ryu	Democratic	Shoreline	King (part), Snohomish (part)	2010
32	2	Lauren Davis	Democratic	Shoreline	King (part), Snohomish (part)	2018
33	1	Edwin Obras	Democratic	SeaTac	King (part)	2024
33	2	Mia Gregerson	Democratic	SeaTac	King (part)	2013
34	1	Brianna Thomas	Democratic	West Seattle	King (part)	2025
34	2	Joe Fitzgibbon	Democratic	West Seattle	King (part)	2010
35	1	Dan Griffey	Republican	Allyn	Kitsap (part), Mason, Thurston (part)	2014
35	2	Travis Couture	Republican	Allyn	Kitsap (part), Mason, Thurston (part)	2022
36	1	Julia Reed	Democratic	Seattle	King (part)	2022
36	2	Liz Berry	Democratic	Seattle	King (part)	2020
37	1	Sharon Tomiko Santos	Democratic	Seattle	King (part)	1998
37	2	Chipalo Street	Democratic	Seattle	King (part)	2022
38	1	Julio Cortes	Democratic	Everett	Snohomish (part)	2022
38	2	Mary Fosse	Democratic	Everett	Snohomish (part)	2022
39	1	Sam Low	Republican	Lake Stevens	King (part), Skagit (part), Snohomish (part)	2022
39	2	Carolyn Eslick	Republican	Sultan	King (part), Skagit (part), Snohomish (part)	2017
40	1	Debra Lekanoff	Democratic	Bow	San Juan, Skagit (part), Whatcom (part)	2018
40	2	Alex Ramel	Democratic	Bellingham	San Juan, Skagit (part), Whatcom (part)	2020
41	1	Janice Zahn	Democratic	Bellevue	King (part)	2025
41	2	My-Linh Thai	Democratic	Bellevue	King (part)	2018
42	1	Alicia Rule	Democratic	Blaine	Whatcom (part)	2020
42	2	Joe Timmons	Democratic	Bellingham	Whatcom (part)	2022
43	1	Nicole Macri	Democratic	Seattle	King (part)	2016
43	2	Shaun Scott	Democratic	Seattle	King (part)	2024
44	1	Brandy Donaghy	Democratic	Mill Creek	Snohomish (part)	2021
44	2	April Berg	Democratic	Mill Creek	Snohomish (part)	2020
45	1	Roger Goodman	Democratic	Kirkland	King (part)	2006
45	2	Larry Springer	Democratic	Kirkland	King (part)	2004
46	1	Gerry Pollet	Democratic	Seattle	King (part)	2011
46	2	Darya Farivar	Democratic	Seattle	King (part)	2022
47	1	Debra Entenman	Democratic	Kent	King (part)	2018
47	2	Chris Stearns	Democratic	Auburn	King (part)	2022
48	1	Osman Salahuddin	Democratic	Redmond	King (part)	2025
48	2	Amy Walen	Democratic	Kirkland	King (part)	2018
49	1	Sharon Wylie	Democratic	Vancouver	Clark (part)	2011
49	2	Monica Stonier (Note: Stonier previously served in the state house from 2013–2015.)	Democratic	Vancouver	Clark (part)	2016

=== Notable former members ===
The first women elected were Frances Cleveland Axtell and Nena Jolidon Croake in 1912.

== See also ==
- Washington State Capitol
- Washington State Legislature
- Washington State Senate
- List of Washington state legislatures
- List of United States federal legislation, 2001–present
