= 2014 Washington House of Representatives election =

Washington State House elections, 2014
- November 4, 2014

98 seats of the Washington State House of Representatives 50 seats needed for a majority
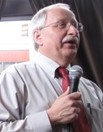

	Majority party	Minority party
Leader	Frank Chopp	Dan Kristiansen
Party	Democratic	Republican
Leader's seat	43rd-Seattle	39th-Snohomish
Last election	55	43
Seats won	51	47
Seat change	▼4	▲4
Popular vote	1,839,583	1,791,268
Percentage	48.6%	47.3%
Swing	▼4.7%	▲3.0%
- Results: Republican gain Democratic hold Republican hold
House Speaker before election
Frank Chopp
Democratic
Elected House Speaker
Frank Chopp
Democratic

The Washington State House elections, 2014 were biennial elections in which each of the 49 legislative districts in Washington chose two people to represent them in the state house. Roughly half of the members of the Washington Senate were elected concurrently to four-year terms from the same legislative districts. The elections were held on November 4, 2014.

Top two primary elections on August 5, 2014, determined which two candidates appeared on the November ballot. Candidates were allowed to write in a party preference.

== Overview ==
=== Results ===
Washington State House Elections, 2014 Primary election — August 5, 2014
Party	Votes	Percentage	Candidates	Advancing to general	Seats contesting
Democratic	1,056,449	48.23%	86	80	
Republican	1,037,912	47.38%	95	85	
Libertarian	51,277	2.34%	12	8	
Independent	44,087	2.01%	15	7	
Green	806	0.04%	1	0	0
Totals	2,189,725	100.00%	209	176	—

Washington State House Elections, 2014 General election — November 4, 2014
Party	Votes	Percentage	Seats	+/–
Democratic	1,839,583	48.59%	51	▼4
Republican	1,791,268	47.31%	47	▲4
Libertarian	82,057	2.17%	0	Steady
Independent	73,027	1.93%	0	Steady
Totals	3,786,125	100.00%	98	—

=== Composition ===
Races with Democratic Incumbent	Seats
Uncontested	9
Contested, vs Democrat	1
Contested, vs Republican	33
Contested, vs Independent	3
Contested, vs Libertarian	4
Contested, vs Socialist Alternative	1
Total	51

Races with Republican Incumbent	Seats
Uncontested	10
Contested, vs Republican	4
Contested, vs Democrat	19
Contested, vs Independent	2
Contested, vs Libertarian	2
Total	37

Open Races	Seats
Libertarian vs Democrat	1
Republican vs Democrat	7
Republican vs Republican	2
Total	10

== Predictions ==
Source	Ranking	As of
Governing	Likely D	October 20, 2014

== Select Nonpartisan Blanket Primary Results ==
District 4

Washington's 4th legislative district House 1 general election, 2014
Party	Candidate	Votes	%
Republican	Leonard Christian (inc.)	6,380	24.77
Republican	Diana Wilhite	7,869	30.55
Republican	Bob McCaslin	11,511	44.69
Total votes			100.00

District 10

Washington's 10th legislative district House 2 general election, 2014
Party	Candidate	Votes	%
Republican	Dave Hayes (inc.)	13,638	48.77
Democratic	David Sponheim	4,220	15.09
Democratic	Nick Petrish	7,332	26.22
Republican	Brien Lillquist	2,775	9.92
Invalid or blank votes			
Total votes			100.00
Turnout			

District 14

Washington's 14th legislative district House 2 general election, 2014
Party	Candidate	Votes	%
Republican	Ben Shoval	2,822	11.97
Republican	Gina R. McCabe	10,770	45.7
Republican	Adam Yoest	3,150	13.37
Democratic	Paul George	6,826	28.96
Total votes			100.00

District 17

Washington's 17th legislative district House 2 general election, 2014
Party	Candidate	Votes	%
Republican	Paul Harris (inc.)	10,551	50.77
Democratic	Richard McCluskey	8,130	39.12
Libertarian	Christ Rockhold	2,100	10.09
Total votes			100.00

District 18

Washington's 18th legislative district House 1 general election, 2014
Party	Candidate	Votes	%
Republican	Brandon Vick (inc.)	8,925	35.19
Democratic	Mike Briggs	9,630	37.97
Republican	John Ley	6,808	26.84
Total votes			100.00
Turnout			

District 21

Washington's 21st legislative district House 1 general election, 2014
Party	Candidate	Votes	%
Democratic	Strom Peterson	5,615	28.4
Democratic	Scott V. Whelpley	4,055	20.51
Democratic	Justin McMahon	2,944	14.89
Democratic	Dick McManus	757	3.83
Republican	Allen McPheeters	6,402	32.38
Total votes			100.00

District 28

Washington's 28th legislative district House 1 general election, 2014
Party	Candidate	Votes	%
Republican	Paul Wagemann	6,353	27.49
Democratic	Christine Kilduff	7,301	31.59
Republican	Monique Valenzuela Trudnowski	5,915	25.59
Independent	Kevin Heiderich	676	2.92
Democratic	John Connelly	2,867	12.4
Total votes			100.00

District 33

Washington's 33rd legislative district House 2 general election, 2014
Party	Candidate	Votes	%
Democratic	Mia Su-Ling Gregerson (inc.)	7,916	49.52
Republican	Jeanette Burrage	5,970	37.35
Independent	Les Thomas	2,100	13.14
Total votes			100.00
Turnout			

District 35

Washington's 35th legislative district House 1 general election, 2014
Party	Candidate	Votes	%
Democratic	Kathy Haigh (inc.)	14,742	49.73
Republican	Dan Griffey	8,746	29.5
Republican	Josiah Rowell	6,155	20.76
Total votes			100.00
Turnout			

District 42

Washington's 42nd legislative district House 1 general election, 2014
Party	Candidate	Votes	%
Libertarian	Nicholas Kunkel	1,193	3.97
Republican	Bill Knutzen	6,900	22.96
Republican	Luanne VanWerven	10,298	34.27
Democratic	Satpal Sidhu	11,661	38.8
Total votes			100.00
Turnout			

District 49

Washington's 49th legislative district House 2 general election, 2014
Party	Candidate	Votes	%
Democratic	Jim Moeller (inc.)	11,300	54.96
Republican	Lisa Ross	5,500	26.75
Republican	Carolyn Crain	3,760	18.29
Total votes			100.00
Turnout			

== General election results ==
=== Districts 1-9 ===
District 1

Washington's 1st legislative district House 1 general election, 2014
Party	Candidate	Votes	%
Democratic	Derek Stanford (inc.)	25,276	58.43
Republican	Mark Davies	17,985	41.57
Total votes		43,261	100.00
Turnout			
Democratic hold			

Washington's 1st legislative district House 2 general election, 2014
Party	Candidate	Votes	%
Democratic	Luis Moscoso (inc.)	23,198	53.91
Republican	Edward J. Barton	19,834	46.09
Total votes		43,032	100.00
Turnout			
Democratic hold			

District 2

Washington's 2nd legislative district House 1 general election, 2014
Party	Candidate	Votes	%
Republican	Graham Hunt (inc.)	22,369	62.35
Democratic	Greg Hartman	13,510	37.65
Total votes		35,879	100.00
Turnout			
Republican hold			

Washington's 2nd legislative district House 2 general election, 2014
Party	Candidate	Votes	%
Republican	J. T. Wilcox (inc.)	24,837	71.84
Libertarian	Steven Nielson	9,734	28.16
Total votes		34,571	100.00
Turnout			
Republican hold			

District 3

Washington's 3rd legislative district House 1 general election, 2014
Party	Candidate	Votes	%
Democratic	Marcus Riccelli (inc.)	19,946	59.91
Republican	Tim Benn (Note: Prefers Independent R Party)	13,349	40.09
Total votes		33,295	100.00
Turnout			
Democratic hold			

Washington's 3rd legislative district House 2 general election, 2014
Party	Candidate	Votes	%
Democratic	Timm Ormsby (inc.)	22,606	69.47
Libertarian	Paul Delaney	9,935	30.53
Total votes		32,541	100.00
Turnout			
Democratic hold			

District 4

Washington's 4th legislative district House 1 general election, 2014
Party	Candidate	Votes	%
Republican	Bob McCaslin	25,268	58.00
Republican	Diana Wilhite	18,301	42.00
Total votes		43,569	100.00
Turnout			
Republican hold			

Washington's 4th legislative district House 2 general election, 2014
Party	Candidate	Votes	%
Republican	Matt Shea (inc.)	25,114	57.75
Republican	Josh Arritola	18,372	42.25
Total votes		43,486	100.00
Turnout			
Republican hold			

District 5

Washington's 5th legislative district House 1 general election, 2014
Party	Candidate	Votes	%
Republican	Jay Rodne (inc.)	26,029	57.64
Democratic	Essie Hicks	19,131	42.36
Total votes		45,160	100.00
Turnout			
Republican hold			

Washington's 5th legislative district House 2 general election, 2014
Party	Candidate	Votes	%
Republican	Chad Magendanz (inc.)	26,287	59.01
Democratic	David Spring	18,259	40.99
Total votes		44,546	100.00
Turnout			
Republican hold			

District 6

Washington's 6th legislative district House 1 general election, 2014
Party	Candidate	Votes	%
Republican	Kevin Parker (inc.)	32,289	67.25
Democratic	Donald Dover	15,722	32.75
Total votes		48,011	100.00
Turnout			
Republican hold			

Washington's 6th legislative district House 2 general election, 2014
Party	Candidate	Votes	%
Republican	Jeff Holy (inc.)	32,078	67.74
Democratic	Ziggy Siegfried	15,277	32.26
Total votes		47,355	100.00
Turnout			
Republican hold			

District 7

Washington's 7th legislative district House 1 general election, 2014
Party	Candidate	Votes	%
Republican	Shelly Short (inc.)	37,648	79.8
Libertarian	James R. Apker	9,528	20.2
Total votes		47,176	100.00
Turnout			
Republican hold			

Washington's 7th legislative district House 2 general election, 2014
Party	Candidate	Votes	%
Republican	Joel Kretz (inc.)	38,934	83.08
Independent	Ronnie Rae (Note: prefers "Centralist Party")	7,932	16.92
Total votes		46,866	100.00
Turnout			
Republican hold			

District 8

Washington's 8th legislative district House 1 general election, 2014
Party	Candidate	Votes	%
Republican	Brad Klippert (inc.)	31,811	100.00
Total votes		31,811	100.00
Turnout			
Republican hold			

Washington's 8th legislative district House 2 general election, 2014
Party	Candidate	Votes	%
Republican	Larry Haler (inc.)	32,188	78.58
Democratic	Eric Kalia	8,775	21.42
Total votes		40,963	100.00
Turnout			
Republican hold			

District 9

Washington's 9th legislative district House 1 general election, 2014
Party	Candidate	Votes	%
Republican	Susan Fagan (inc.)	28,550	100.00
Total votes		28,550	100.00
Turnout			
Republican hold			

Washington's 9th legislative district House 2 general election, 2014
Party	Candidate	Votes	%
Republican	Joe Schmick (inc.) (Note: Prefers "G.O.P. Party")	28,058	100.00
Total votes		28,058	100.00
Turnout			
Republican hold			

=== Districts 10-19 ===
District 10

Washington's 10th legislative district House 1 general election, 2014
Party	Candidate	Votes	%
Republican	Norma Smith (inc.)	37,119	76.28
Libertarian	Michael Scott	11,544	23.72
Total votes		48,663	100.00
Republican hold			

Washington's 10th legislative district House 2 general election, 2014
Party	Candidate	Votes	%
Republican	Dave Hayes (inc.)	30,993	59.66
Democratic	Nick Petrish	20,955	40.34
Total votes		51,948	100.00
Turnout			
Republican hold			

District 11

Washington's 11th legislative district House 1 general election, 2014
Party	Candidate	Votes	%
Democratic	Zach Hudgins (inc.)	20,763	100.00
Democratic hold			

Washington's 11th legislative district House 2 general election, 2014
Party	Candidate	Votes	%
Democratic	Steve Bergquist (inc.)	18,990	66.73
Republican	Sarah Sanoy-Wright	9,466	33.27
Total votes		23,456	100.00
Democratic hold			

District 12

Washington's 12th legislative district House 1 general election, 2014
Party	Candidate	Votes	%
Republican	Cary Condotta (inc.)	28,899	100.00
Republican hold			

Washington's 12th legislative district House 2 general election, 2014
Party	Candidate	Votes	%
Republican	Brad Hawkins (inc.)	28,913	100.00
Republican hold			

District 13

Washington's 13th legislative district House 1 general election, 2014
Party	Candidate	Votes	%
Republican	Tom Dent	20,876	63.26
Republican	Dannette (Dani) Bolyard	12,123	36.74
Total votes		32,999	100.00
Republican hold			

Washington's 13th legislative district House 2 general election, 2014
Party	Candidate	Votes	%
Republican	Matt Manweller (inc.)	27,459	100.00
Republican hold			

District 14

Washington's 14th legislative district House 1 general election, 2014
Party	Candidate	Votes	%
Republican	Norm Johnson (inc.)	20,584	56.68
Independent	Michael S. Brumback	15,732	43.32
Total votes		36,316	100.00
Republican hold			

Washington's 14th legislative district House 2 general election, 2014
Party	Candidate	Votes	%
Republican	Gina R. McCabe	25,363	68.67
Democratic	Paul George	11,574	31.33
Total votes		36,937	100.00
Republican hold			

District 15

Washington's 15th legislative district House 1 general election, 2014
Party	Candidate	Votes	%
Republican	Bruce Chandler (inc.)	18,650	100.00
Republican hold			

Washington's 15th legislative district House 2 general election, 2014
Party	Candidate	Votes	%
Republican	David V. Taylor (inc.)	16,523	72.41
Democratic	Teodora Martinez-Chavez	6,297	27.59
Total votes		22,820	100.00
Republican hold			

District 16

Washington's 16th legislative district House 1 general election, 2014
Party	Candidate	Votes	%
Republican	Maureen Walsh (inc.)	19,152	59.11
Republican	Mary Ruth Edwards	13,248	40.89
Total votes		32,400	100.00
Republican hold			

Washington's 16th legislative district House 2 general election, 2014
Party	Candidate	Votes	%
Republican	Terry Nealey (inc.)	24,497	73.20
Democratic	Frank Blair	8,967	26.80
Total votes		33,464	100.00
Republican hold			

District 17

Washington's 17th legislative district House 1 general election, 2014
Party	Candidate	Votes	%
Republican	Lynda Wilson	18,920	51.60
Democratic	Monica Stonier (inc.)	17,747	48.40
Total votes		36,667	100.00
Republican gain from Democratic			

Washington's 17th legislative district House 2 general election, 2014
Party	Candidate	Votes	%
Republican	Paul Harris (inc.)	22,212	61.61
Democratic	Richard McCluskey	13,840	38.39
Total votes		36,052	100.00
Republican hold			

District 18

Washington's 18th legislative district House 1 general election, 2014
Party	Candidate	Votes	%
Republican	Brandon Vick (inc.)	28,221	63.07
Democratic	Mike Briggs	16,521	36.93
Total votes		44,742	100.00
Republican hold			

Washington's 18th legislative district House 2 general election, 2014
Party	Candidate	Votes	%
Republican	Liz Pike (inc.)	26,619	59.20
Democratic	Maureen Winningham	18,342	40.80
Total votes		44,961	100.00
Republican hold			

District 19

Washington's 19th legislative district House 1 general election, 2014
Party	Candidate	Votes	%
Democratic	Dean Takko (inc.)	26,006	66.95
Libertarian	David A. Steenson	12,838	33.05
Total votes		38,844	100.00
Democratic hold			

Washington's 19th legislative district House 2 general election, 2014
Party	Candidate	Votes	%
Democratic	Brian Blake (inc.)	25,430	63.47
Republican	Hugh Fleet	14,637	36.53
Total votes		40,067	100.00
Democratic hold			

=== Districts 20-29 ===
District 20

Washington's 20th legislative district House 1 general election, 2014
Party	Candidate	Votes	%
Republican	Richard DeBolt (inc.)		
Independent	Michael Savoca		
Total votes			100.00
Republican hold			

Washington's 20th legislative district House 2 general election, 2014
Party	Candidate	Votes	%
Republican	Ed Orcutt (inc.)		
Republican	John Morgan		
Total votes			100.00
Republican hold			

District 21

Washington's 21st legislative district House 1 general election, 2014
Party	Candidate	Votes	%
Democratic	Strom Peterson		
Republican	Allen McPheeters		
Total votes			100.00
Democratic hold			

Washington's 21st legislative district House 2 general election, 2014
Party	Candidate	Votes	%
Democratic	Lillian Ortiz-Self		
Republican	Jeff Scherrer		
Total votes			100.00
Turnout			
Democratic hold			

District 22

Washington's 22nd legislative district House 1 general election, 2014
Party	Candidate	Votes	%
Democratic	Chris Reykdal (inc.)		
Republican	Steve Owens		
Total votes			100.00
Turnout			
Democratic hold			

Washington's 22nd legislative district House 2 general election, 2014
Party	Candidate	Votes	%
Democratic	Sam Hunt (inc.)		
Independent	Franklin Edwards		
Total votes			100.00
Turnout			
Democratic hold			

District 23

Washington's 23rd legislative district House 1 general election, 2014
Party	Candidate	Votes	%
Democratic	Sherry Appleton (inc.)		
Republican	Scott Henden		
Total votes			100.00
Turnout			
Democratic hold			

Washington's 23rd legislative district House 2 general election, 2014
Party	Candidate	Votes	%
Democratic	Drew Hansen (inc.)		
Republican	James M. Olsen (Note: Prefers "Grand Old Party")		
Total votes			100.00
Turnout			
Democratic hold			

District 24

Washington's 24th legislative district House 1 general election, 2014
Party	Candidate	Votes	%
Democratic	Kevin Van De Wege (inc.)		
Total votes			100.00
Turnout			
Democratic hold			

Washington's 24th legislative district House 2 general election, 2014
Party	Candidate	Votes	%
Democratic	Steve Tharinger (inc.)		
Republican	Thomas W. Greisamer		
Total votes			100.00
Turnout			
Democratic hold			

District 25

Washington's 25th legislative district House 1 general election, 2014
Party	Candidate	Votes	%
Democratic	Dawn Morrell (inc.)		
Republican	Melanie Stambaugh		
Total votes			100.00
Republican gain from Democratic			

Washington's 25th legislative district House 2 general election, 2014
Party	Candidate	Votes	%
Republican	Hans Zeiger (inc.)		
Democratic	Eric Renz		
Total votes			100.00
Turnout			
Republican hold			

District 26

Washington's 26th legislative district House 1 general election, 2014
Party	Candidate	Votes	%
Republican	Jesse Young (inc.)		
Democratic	Nathan Schlicher		
Total votes			100.00
Turnout			
Republican hold			

Washington's 26th legislative district House 2 general election, 2014
Party	Candidate	Votes	%
Democratic	Larry Seaquist (inc.)		
Republican	Michelle Caldier		
Total votes			100.00
Turnout			
Republican gain from Democratic			

District 27

Washington's 27th legislative district House 1 general election, 2014
Party	Candidate	Votes	%
Democratic	Laurie Jinkins (inc.)		
Republican	Rodger Deskins		
Total votes			100.00
Turnout			
Democratic hold			

Washington's 27th legislative district House 2 general election, 2014
Party	Candidate	Votes	%
Democratic	Jake Fey (inc.)		
Republican	Steven T. Cook		
Total votes			100.00
Turnout			
Democratic hold			

District 28

Washington's 28th legislative district House 1 general election, 2014
Party	Candidate	Votes	%
Republican	Dick Muri (inc.)		
Democratic	Mary Moss		
Total votes			100.00
Turnout			
Republican hold			

Washington's 28th legislative district House 2 general election, 2014
Party	Candidate	Votes	%
Democratic	Christine Kilduff		
Republican	Paul Wagemann		
Total votes			100.00
Turnout			

District 29

Washington's 29th legislative district House 1 general election, 2014
Party	Candidate	Votes	%
Democratic	David Sawyer (inc.)		
Republican	Jason Bergstrom		
Total votes			100.00
Turnout			
Democratic hold			

Washington's 29th legislative district House 2 general election, 2014
Party	Candidate	Votes	%
Democratic	Steve Kirby (inc.)		100.00
Total votes			100.00
Turnout			
Democratic hold			

=== Districts 30-39 ===
District 30

Washington's 30th legislative district House 1 general election, 2014
Party	Candidate	Votes	%
Republican	Linda Kochmar (inc.)		
Democratic	Greg Baruso		
Total votes			100.00
Turnout			
Republican hold			

Washington's 30th legislative district House 2 general election, 2014
Party	Candidate	Votes	%
Democratic	Roger Freeman (inc.) (deceased)		
Republican	Jack Dovey		
Total votes			100.00
Turnout			
Democratic hold			

District 31

Washington's 31st legislative district House 1 general election, 2014
Party	Candidate	Votes	%
Republican	Drew Stokesbary		
Democratic	Mike Sando		
Total votes			100.00
Turnout			
Republican hold			

Washington's 31st legislative district House 2 general election, 2014
Party	Candidate	Votes	%
Democratic	Christopher Hurst (Note: Prefers Independent Dem Party) (inc.)		
Republican	Phil Fortunato (Note: Prefers Ind Republican Party)		
Total votes			100.00
Turnout			
Democratic hold			

District 32

Washington's 32nd legislative district House 1 general election, 2014
Party	Candidate	Votes	%
Democratic	Cindy Ryu (inc.)		
Total votes			100.00
Turnout			
Democratic hold			

Washington's 32nd legislative district House 2 general election, 2014
Party	Candidate	Votes	%
Democratic	Ruth Kagi (inc.)		
Republican	Alvin A. Rutledge		
Total votes			100.00
Turnout			
Democratic hold			

District 33

Washington's 33rd legislative district House 1 general election, 2014
Party	Candidate	Votes	%
Democratic	Tina Orwall (inc.)		
Republican	Michael J. Siefkes		
Total votes			100.00
Turnout			
Democratic hold			

Washington's 33rd legislative district House 2 general election, 2014
Party	Candidate	Votes	%
Democratic	Mia Su-Ling Gregerson (inc.)		
Republican	Jeanette Burrage		
Total votes			100.00
Turnout			
Democratic hold			

District 34

Washington's 34th legislative district House 1 general election, 2014
Party	Candidate	Votes	%
Democratic	Eileen Cody (inc.)		
Total votes			100.00
Turnout			
Democratic hold			

Washington's 34th legislative district House 2 general election, 2014
Party	Candidate	Votes	%
Democratic	Joe Fitzgibbon (inc.)		
Democratic	Brendan B. Kolding		
Total votes			100.00
Turnout			
Democratic hold			

District 35

Washington's 35th legislative district House 1 general election, 2014
Party	Candidate	Votes	%
Democratic	Kathy Haigh (inc.)		
Republican	Dan Griffey		
Total votes			100.00
Turnout			
Republican gain from Democratic			

Washington's 35th legislative district House 2 general election, 2014
Party	Candidate	Votes	%
Republican	Drew C. MacEwen (inc.)		
Democratic	Tammey Newton		
Total votes			100.00
Turnout			
Republican hold			

District 36

Washington's 36th legislative district House 1 general election, 2014
Party	Candidate	Votes	%
Democratic	Reuven Carlyle (inc.)		
Republican	Leslie Klein (Note: Prefers Republicanspirit Party)		
Total votes			100.00
Turnout			
Democratic hold			

Washington's 36th legislative district House 2 general election, 2014
Party	Candidate	Votes	%
Democratic	Gael Tarleton (inc.)		
Libertarian	Paul Addis		
Total votes			100.00
Turnout			
Democratic hold			

District 37

Washington's 37th legislative district House 1 general election, 2014
Party	Candidate	Votes	%
Democratic	Sharon Tomiko Santos (inc.)		
Republican	Daniel Bretzke		
Total votes			100.00
Turnout			
Democratic hold			

Washington's 37th legislative district House 2 general election, 2014
Party	Candidate	Votes	%
Democratic	Eric Pettigrew (inc.)		
Independent	Tamra Smilanich (Note: Prefers Non-Partisan Party)		
Total votes			100.00
Turnout			
Democratic hold			

District 38

Washington's 38th legislative district House 1 general election, 2014
Party	Candidate	Votes	%
Democratic	June Robinson (inc.)		
Republican	Jesse Anderson		
Total votes			100.00
Turnout			
Democratic hold			

Washington's 38th legislative district House 2 general election, 2014
Party	Candidate	Votes	%
Democratic	Mike Sells (inc.)		
Libertarian	Elijah Olson		
Total votes			100.00
Turnout			
Democratic hold			

District 39

Washington's 39th legislative district House 1 general election, 2014
Party	Candidate	Votes	%
Republican	Dan Kristiansen (inc.)		
Total votes			100.00
Turnout			
Republican hold			

Washington's 39th legislative district House 2 general election, 2014
Party	Candidate	Votes	%
Republican	Elizabeth Scott (inc.)		
Democratic	Charles Jensen		
Total votes			100.00
Turnout			
Republican hold			

=== Districts 40-49 ===
District 40

Washington's 40th legislative district House 1 general election, 2014
Party	Candidate	Votes	%
Democratic	Kristine Lytton (inc.)		
Republican	Daniel R. Miller		

Washington's 40th legislative district House 2 general election, 2014
Party	Candidate	Votes	%
Democratic	Jeff Morris (inc.)		
Democratic hold			

District 41

Washington's 41st legislative district House 1 general election, 2014
Party	Candidate	Votes	%
Democratic	Tana Senn (inc.)		
Republican	Bill Stinson		
Total votes			100.00
Democratic hold			

Washington's 41st legislative district House 2 general election, 2014
Party	Candidate	Votes	%
Democratic	Judy Clibborn (inc.)		
Independent	Alex O'Neil		
Total votes			100.00
Democratic hold			

District 42

Washington's 42nd legislative district House 1 general election, 2014
Party	Candidate	Votes	%
Republican	Luanne VanWerven		
Democratic	Satpal Sidhu		
Total votes			100.00
Turnout			
Republican hold			

Washington's 42nd legislative district House 2 general election, 2014
Party	Candidate	Votes	%
Republican	Vincent Buys (inc.)		
Democratic	Joy Monjure		
Total votes			100.00
Turnout			
Republican hold			

District 43

Washington's 43rd legislative district House 1 general election, 2014
Party	Candidate	Votes	%
Democratic	Brady Walkinshaw (inc.)		
Total votes			100.00
Democratic hold			

Washington's 43rd legislative district House 2 general election, 2014
Party	Candidate	Votes	%
Democratic	Frank Chopp (inc.)		
Socialist Alternative	Jessica Spear		
Total votes			100.00
Democratic hold			

District 44

Washington's 44th legislative district House 1 general election, 2014
Party	Candidate	Votes	%
Democratic	Hans Dunshee (inc.)		
Republican	Rob Toyer		
Total votes			100.00
Turnout			
Democratic hold			

Washington's 44th legislative district House 2 general election, 2014
Party	Candidate	Votes	%
Republican	Mark Harmsworth		
Democratic	Mike Wilson		
Total votes			100.00
Turnout			
Republican hold			

District 45

Washington's 45th legislative district House 1 general election, 2014
Party	Candidate	Votes	%
Democratic	Roger Goodman (inc.)		
Republican	Joel Hussey		
Total votes			100.00
Democratic hold			

Washington's 45th legislative district House 2 general election, 2014
Party	Candidate	Votes	%
Democratic	Larry Springer (inc.)		
Republican	Brendan Woodward		
Total votes			100.00
Turnout			
Democratic hold			

District 46

Washington's 46th legislative district House 1 general election, 2014
Party	Candidate	Votes	%
Democratic	Gerry Pollet (inc.)		
Total votes			100.00
Democratic hold			

Washington's 46th legislative district House 2 general election, 2014
Party	Candidate	Votes	%
Democratic	Jessyn Farrell (inc.)		
Republican	Branden Curtis		
Total votes			100.00
Democratic hold			

District 47

Washington's 47th legislative district House 1 general election, 2014
Party	Candidate	Votes	%
Republican	Mark Hargrove (inc.)		
Democratic	Chris Barringer		
Total votes			100.00
Republican hold			

Washington's 47th legislative district House 2 general election, 2014
Party	Candidate	Votes	%
Democratic	Pat Sullivan (inc.)		
Republican	Barry Knowles		
Total votes			100.00
Democratic hold			

District 48

Washington's 48th legislative district House 1 general election, 2014
Party	Candidate	Votes	%
Democratic	Ross Hunter (inc.)		
Republican	Bill Hirt		
Total votes			100.00
Democratic hold			

Washington's 48th legislative district House 2 general election, 2014
Party	Candidate	Votes	%
Democratic	Joan McBride		
Libertarian	Tim Turner		
Total votes			100.00
Democratic hold			

District 49

Washington's 49th legislative district House 1 general election, 2014
Party	Candidate	Votes	%
Democratic	Sharon Wylie (inc.)		
Republican	Anson Service		
Total votes			100.00
Turnout			
Democratic hold			

Washington's 49th legislative district House 2 general election, 2014
Party	Candidate	Votes	%
Democratic	Jim Moeller (inc.)		
Republican	Lisa Ross		
Total votes			100.00
Turnout			
Democratic hold			
