= 2018 Washington House of Representatives election =

Washington House of Representatives elections, 2018
- November 6, 2018

All 98 seats in the Washington House of Representatives 50 seats needed for a majority
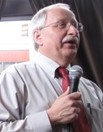

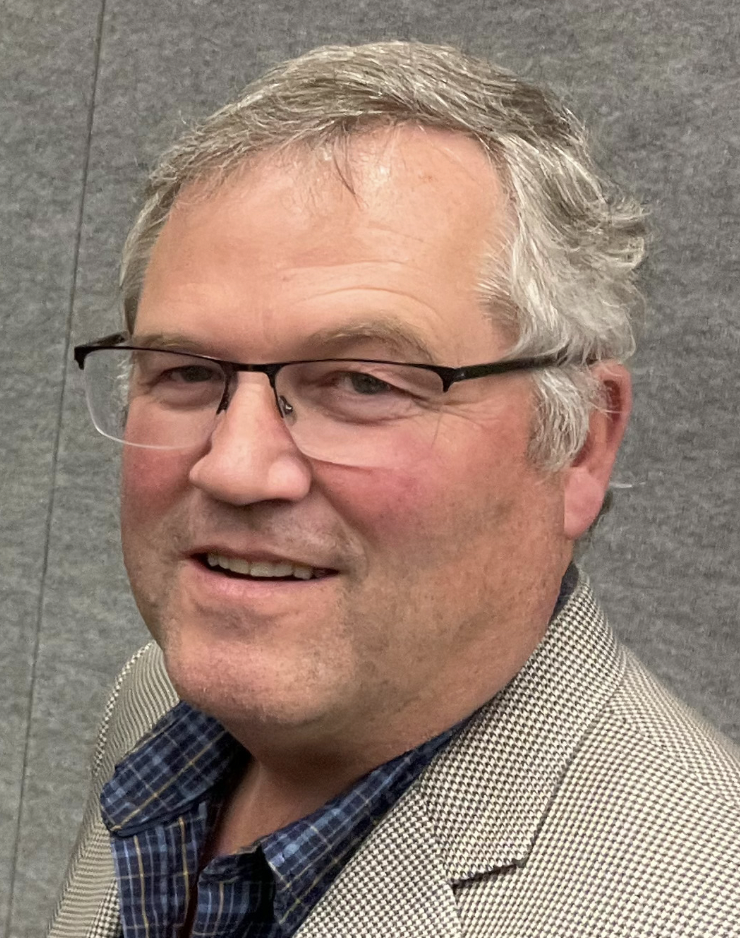
	Majority party	Minority party
Leader	Frank Chopp	J.T. Wilcox
Party	Democratic	Republican
Leader's seat	43rd-Seattle	2nd-Roy
Last election	50	48
Seats won	57	41
Seat change	▲7	▼7
Popular vote	3,447,724	2,214,282
Percentage	59.3%	38.1%
Swing	▲5.0%	▼5.0%
- Results: Democratic gain Democratic hold Republican hold
Speaker of the House before election
Frank Chopp
Democratic
Elected Speaker of the House
Frank Chopp
Democratic

The 2018 Washington House of Representatives elections took place as part of the biennial United States elections. Washington state voters elected state representatives in all 98 seats of the House, electing 2 state representatives in each of the 49 Washington state legislative districts. State representatives serve two-year terms in the Washington House of Representatives. A statewide map of Washington's state legislative districts is provided by the Washington State Legislature here,.

A top two primary election on August 7, 2018, determined which candidates appeared on the November 6 general election ballot. Each candidate is allowed to write in their party preference so that it appears as they desire on the ballot.

Democrats increased their 50–48 majority in the 2016 elections by flipping seven seats to hold 57 seats to Republicans' 41.

Only three districts, the 10th, 19th, and 42nd, elected their two representatives from different parties.

== Overview ==
Washington State House elections, 2018 Primary election — August 7, 2018
Party	Votes	Percentage	Candidates	Advancing to general	Seats contesting
Democratic	1,959,523	60.25%	110	97	
Republican	1,196,960	36.80%	92	76	
Independent	72,673	2.23%	19	6	
Libertarian	23,352	0.72%	5	3	
Totals	3,252,508	100.00%	226	182	—

Washington State House elections, 2018 General election — November 6, 2018
Party	Votes	Percentage	Seats	+/–
Democratic	3,447,724	59.27%	57	▲7
Republican	2,214,282	38.06%	41	▼7
Independent	113,037	1.94%	0	Steady
Libertarian	42,314	0.73%	0	Steady
Totals	5,817,357	100.0%	98	—

== Predictions ==
Source	Ranking	As of
Governing	Likely D	October 8, 2018

== Summary of results by State House district ==
State House district	Position	Incumbent	Party	Elected representative	Party
1st	1	Derek Stanford	Democrat	Derek Stanford	Democrat
1st	2	Shelley Kloba	Democrat	Shelley Kloba	Democrat
2nd	1	Andrew Barkis	Republican	Andrew Barkis	Republican
2nd	2	J.T. Wilcox	Republican	J.T. Wilcox	Republican
3rd	1	Marcus Riccelli	Democrat	Marcus Riccelli	Democrat
3rd	2	Timm Ormsby	Democrat	Timm Ormsby	Democrat
4th	1	Matt Shea	Republican	Matt Shea	Republican
4th	2	Bob McCaslin Jr.	Republican	Bob McCaslin Jr.	Republican
5th	1	Jay Rodne	Republican	Bill Ramos	Democrat
5th	2	Paul Graves	Republican	Lisa Callan	Democrat
6th	1	Mike Volz	Republican	Mike Volz	Republican
6th	2	Jeff Holy	Republican	Jenny Graham	Republican
7th	1	Jacquelin Maycumber	Republican	Jacquelin Maycumber	Republican
7th	2	Joel Kretz	Republican	Joel Kretz	Republican
8th	1	Brad Klippert	Republican	Brad Klippert	Republican
8th	2	Larry Haler	Republican	Matt Boehnke	Republican
9th	1	Mary Dye	Republican	Mary Dye	Republican
9th	2	Joe Schmick	Republican	Joe Schmick	Republican
10th	1	Norma Smith	Republican	Norma Smith	Republican
10th	2	Dave Hayes	Republican	Dave Paul	Democrat
11th	1	Zack Hudgins	Democrat	Zack Hudgins	Democrat
11th	2	Steve Bergquist	Democrat	Steve Bergquist	Democrat
12th	1	Cary Condotta	Republican	Keith Goehner	Republican
12th	2	Mike Steele	Republican	Mike Steele	Republican
13th	1	Tom Dent	Republican	Tom Dent	Republican
13th	2	Matt Manweller	Republican	Matt Manweller	Republican
14th	1	Norm Johnson	Republican	Chris Corry	Republican
14th	2	Gina Mosbrucker	Republican	Gina Mosbrucker	Republican
15th	1	Bruce Chandler	Republican	Bruce Chandler	Republican
15th	2	David Taylor	Republican	Jeremie Dufault	Republican
16th	1	Bill Jenkin	Republican	Bill Jenkin	Republican
16th	2	Terry Nealey	Republican	Skyler Rude	Republican
17th	1	Vicki Kraft	Republican	Vicki Kraft	Republican
17th	2	Paul Harris	Republican	Paul Harris	Republican
18th	1	Brandon Vick	Republican	Brandon Vick	Republican
18th	2	Liz Pike	Republican	Larry Hoff	Republican
19th	1	Jim Walsh	Republican	Jim Walsh	Republican
19th	2	Brian Blake	Democrat	Brian Blake	Democrat
20th	1	Richard DeBolt	Republican	Richard DeBolt	Republican
20th	2	Ed Orcutt	Republican	Ed Orcutt	Republican
21st	1	Strom Peterson	Democrat	Strom Peterson	Democrat
21st	2	Lillian Ortiz-Self	Democrat	Lillian Ortiz-Self	Democrat
22nd	1	Laurie Dolan	Democrat	Laurie Dolan	Democrat
22nd	2	Beth Doglio	Democrat	Beth Doglio	Democrat
23rd	1	Sherry Appleton	Democrat	Sherry Appleton	Democrat
23rd	2	Drew Hansen	Democrat	Drew Hansen	Democrat
24th	1	Mike Chapman	Democrat	Mike Chapman	Democrat
24th	2	Steve Tharinger	Democrat	Steve Tharinger	Democrat
25th	1	Melanie Stambaugh	Republican	Kelly Chambers	Republican
25th	2	Joyce McDonald	Republican	Chris Gildon	Republican
26th	1	Jesse Young	Republican	Jesse Young	Republican
26th	2	Michelle Caldier	Republican	Michelle Caldier	Republican
27th	1	Laurie Jinkins	Democrat	Laurie Jinkins	Democrat
27th	2	Jake Fey	Democrat	Jake Fey	Democrat
28th	1	Dick Muri	Republican	Mari Leavitt	Democrat
28th	2	Christine Kilduff	Democrat	Christine Kilduff	Democrat
29th	1	David Sawyer	Democrat	Melanie Morgan	Democrat
29th	2	Steve Kirby	Democrat	Steve Kirby	Democrat
30th	1	Mike Pellicciotti	Democrat	Mike Pellicciotti	Democrat
30th	2	Kristine Reeves	Democrat	Kristine Reeves	Democrat
31st	1	Drew Stokesbary	Republican	Drew Stokesbary	Republican
31st	2	Morgan Irwin	Republican	Morgan Irwin	Republican
32nd	1	Cindy Ryu	Democrat	Cindy Ryu	Democrat
32nd	2	Ruth Kagi	Democrat	Lauren Davis	Democrat
33rd	1	Tina Orwall	Democrat	Tina Orwall	Democrat
33rd	2	Mia Gregerson	Democrat	Mia Gregerson	Democrat
34th	1	Eileen Cody	Democrat	Eileen Cody	Democrat
34th	2	Joe Fitzgibbon	Democrat	Joe Fitzgibbon	Democrat
35th	1	Dan Griffey	Republican	Dan Griffey	Republican
35th	2	Drew C. MacEwen	Republican	Drew C. MacEwen	Republican
36th	1	Noel Frame	Democrat	Noel Frame	Democrat
36th	2	Gael Tarleton	Democrat	Gael Tarleton	Democrat
37th	1	Sharon Tomiko Santos	Democrat	Sharon Tomiko Santos	Democrat
37th	2	Eric Pettigrew	Democrat	Eric Pettigrew	Democrat
38th	1	June Robinson	Democrat	June Robinson	Democrat
38th	2	Mike Sells	Democrat	Mike Sells	Democrat
39th	1	Dan Kristiansen	Republican	Robert J. Sutherland	Republican
39th	2	Carolyn Eslick	Republican	Carolyn Eslick	Republican
40th	1	Kristine Lytton	Democrat	Debra Lekanoff	Democrat
40th	2	Jeff Morris	Democrat	Jeff Morris	Democrat
41st	1	Tana Senn	Democrat	Tana Senn	Democrat
41st	2	Judy Clibborn	Democrat	My-Linh Thai	Democrat
42nd	1	Luanne Van Werven	Republican	Luanne Van Werven	Republican
42nd	2	Vincent Buys	Republican	Sharon Shewmake	Democrat
43rd	1	Nicole Macri	Democrat	Nicole Macri	Democrat
43rd	2	Frank Chopp	Democrat	Frank Chopp	Democrat
44th	1	John Lovick	Democrat	John Lovick	Democrat
44th	2	Mark Harmsworth	Republican	Jared Mead	Democrat
45th	1	Roger Goodman	Democrat	Roger Goodman	Democrat
45th	2	Larry Springer	Democrat	Larry Springer	Democrat
46th	1	Gerry Pollet	Democrat	Gerry Pollet	Democrat
46th	2	Javier Valdez	Democrat	Javier Valdez	Democrat
47th	1	Mark Hargrove	Republican	Debra Entenman	Democrat
47th	2	Pat Sullivan	Democrat	Pat Sullivan	Democrat
48th	1	Vandana Slatter	Democrat	Vandana Slatter	Democrat
48th	2	Joan McBride	Democrat	Amy Walen	Democrat
49th	1	Sharon Wylie	Democrat	Sharon Wylie	Democrat
49th	2	Monica Jurado Stonier	Democrat	Monica Jurado Stonier	Democrat

== Detailed primary and general election results by House district ==
=== District 1 ===
Position 1

Washington's 1st Legislative District Position 1 election, 2018
Primary election
Party	Candidate	Votes	%
Democratic	Derek Stanford (incumbent)	23,927	66.98
Republican	Josh Colver	9,192	25.73
Independent	Colin McMahon (Note: Listed on ballot as "No Party Preference.")	2,603	7.29
Total votes		35,722	100.0
General election
Democratic	Derek Stanford (incumbent)	47,881	69.59
Republican	Josh Colver	20,925	30.41
Total votes		68,806	100.0
Democratic hold			

Position 2

Washington's 1st Legislative District Position 2 election, 2018
Primary election
Party	Candidate	Votes	%
Democratic	Shelley Kloba (incumbent)	22,638	63.06
Republican	Debra Blodgett	11,142	31.04
Libertarian	Matt Seymour	2,121	5.91
Total votes		35,901	100.0
General election
Democratic	Shelley Kloba (incumbent)	43,560	63.4
Republican	Debra Blodgett	25,148	36.6
Total votes		68,708	100.0
Democratic hold			

=== District 2 ===
Position 1

Washington's 2nd Legislative District Position 1 election, 2018
Primary election
Party	Candidate	Votes	%
Republican	Andrew Barkis (incumbent)	15,337	57.13
Democratic	Anneliese Feld	11,511	42.87
Total votes		26,848	100.0
General election
Republican	Andrew Barkis (incumbent)	33,717	59.11
Democratic	Anneliese Feld	23,324	40.89
Total votes		57,041	100.0
Republican hold			

Position 2

Washington's 2nd Legislative District Position 2 election, 2018
Primary election
Party	Candidate	Votes	%
Republican	J.T. Wilcox (incumbent)	18,853	100.0
Total votes		18,853	100.0
General election
Republican	J.T. Wilcox (incumbent)	42,571	100.0
Total votes		42,571	100.0
Republican hold			

=== District 3 ===
Position 1

Washington's 3rd Legislative District Position 1 election, 2018
Primary election
Party	Candidate	Votes	%
Democratic	Marcus Riccelli (incumbent)	20,597	65.45
Republican	Tom Taylor	10,875	34.55
Total votes		31,472	100.0
General election
Democratic	Marcus Riccelli (incumbent)	33,539	64.15
Republican	Tom Taylor	18,741	35.85
Total votes		52,280	100.0
Democratic hold			

Position 2

Washington's 3rd Legislative District Position 2 election, 2018
Primary election
Party	Candidate	Votes	%
Democratic	Timm Ormsby (incumbent)	20,352	64.37
Republican	Dave Lucas	11,267	35.63
Total votes		31,619	100.0
General election
Democratic	Timm Ormsby (incumbent)	31,983	61.15
Republican	Dave Lucas	20,322	38.85
Total votes		52,305	100.0
Democratic hold			

=== District 4 ===
Position 1

Washington's 4th Legislative District Position 1 election, 2018
Primary election
Party	Candidate	Votes	%
Republican	Matt Shea (incumbent)	23,934	57.4
Democratic	Ted Cummings	17,766	42.6
Total votes		41,700	100.0
General election
Republican	Matt Shea (incumbent)	39,572	57.74
Democratic	Ted Cummings	28,963	42.26
Total votes		68,535	100.0
Republican hold			

Position 2

Washington's 4th Legislative District Position 2 election, 2018
Primary election
Party	Candidate	Votes	%
Republican	Bob McCaslin (incumbent)	25,518	61.14
Democratic	Mary May	16,219	38.86
Total votes		41,737	100.0
General election
Republican	Bob McCaslin (incumbent)	42,613	61.88
Democratic	Mary May	26,254	38.12
Total votes		68,867	100.0
Republican hold			

=== District 5 ===
Position 1

Washington's 5th Legislative District Position 1 election, 2018
Primary election
Party	Candidate	Votes	%
Democratic	Bill Ramos	23,148	54.04
Republican	Chad Magendanz	19,685	45.96
Total votes		42,833	100.0
General election
Democratic	Bill Ramos	38,972	51.51
Republican	Chad Magendanz	36,692	48.49
Total votes		75,664	100.0
Democratic gain from Republican			

Position 2

Washington's 5th Legislative District Position 2 election, 2018
Primary election
Party	Candidate	Votes	%
Democratic	Lisa Callan	22,806	53.34
Republican	Paul Graves (incumbent)	19,312	45.17
Independent	Ryan Dean Burkett	636	1.49
Total votes		42,754	100.0
General election
Democratic	Lisa Callan	39,330	52.25
Republican	Paul Graves (incumbent)	35,944	47.75
Total votes		75,274	100.0
Democratic gain from Republican			

=== District 6 ===
Position 1

Washington's 6th Legislative District Position 1 election, 2018
Primary election
Party	Candidate	Votes	%
Republican	Mike Volz (incumbent)	22,031	50.26
Democratic	Kay Murano	21,803	49.74
Total votes		43,834	100.0
General election
Republican	Mike Volz (incumbent)	36,800	53.45
Democratic	Kay Murano	32,044	46.55
Total votes		68,844	100.0
Republican hold			

Position 2

Washington's 6th Legislative District Position 2 election, 2018
Primary election
Party	Candidate	Votes	%
Democratic	Dave Wilson	17,033	40.05
Republican	Jenny Graham	14,183	33.35
Republican	John W. Aiken, Jr.	6,623	15.57
Democratic	Rion Ametu	4,686	11.02
Total votes		42,525	100.0
General election
Republican	Jenny Graham	34,644	50.49
Democratic	Dave Wilson	33,972	49.51
Total votes		68,616	100.0
Republican hold			

=== District 7 ===
Position 1

Washington's 7th Legislative District Position 1 election, 2018
Primary election
Party	Candidate	Votes	%
Republican	Jacquelin Maycumber (incumbent)	30,181	67.11
Democratic	Randall (Randy) Michaelis	14,789	32.89
Total votes		44,970	100.0
General election
Republican	Jacquelin Maycumber (incumbent)	47,365	68.41
Democratic	Randall (Randy) Michaelis	21,867	31.59
Total votes		69,232	100.0
Republican hold			

Position 2

Washington's 7th Legislative District Position 2 election, 2018
Primary election
Party	Candidate	Votes	%
Republican	Joel Kretz (incumbent)	29,650	65.47
Democratic	Mike Bell	7,245	16.00
Democratic	Crystal Oliver	6,409	14.15
Independent	Christine A. Ives	1,984	4.38
Total votes		45,288	100.0
General election
Republican	Joel Kretz (incumbent)	46,987	67.84
Democratic	Mike Bell	22,270	32.16
Total votes		69,257	100.0
Republican hold			

=== District 8 ===
Position 1

Washington's 8th Legislative District Position 1 election, 2018
Primary election
Party	Candidate	Votes	%
Republican	Brad Klippert (incumbent)	15,612	49.94
Democratic	Shir Regev	10,505	33.61
Republican	Phillip R. Lemley	5,143	16.45
Total votes		31,260	100.0
General election
Republican	Brad Klippert (incumbent)	38,570	65.28
Democratic	Shir Regev	20,514	34.72
Total votes		59,084	100.0
Republican hold			

Position 2

Washington's 8th Legislative District Position 2 election, 2018
Primary election
Party	Candidate	Votes	%
Republican	Matt Boehnke	12,164	39.68
Democratic	Christopher Tracy	11,380	37.13
Republican	Gregg McConnell	7,109	23.19
Total votes		30,653	100.0
General election
Republican	Matt Boehnke	38,817	66.31
Democratic	Christopher Tracy	19,726	33.69
Total votes		58,543	100.0
Republican hold			

=== District 9 ===
Position 1

Washington's 9th Legislative District Position 1 election, 2018
Primary election
Party	Candidate	Votes	%
Republican	Mary Dye (incumbent)	19,479	63.42
Democratic	Jenn Goulet	11,237	36.58
Total votes		30,716	100.0
General election
Republican	Mary Dye (incumbent)	33,978	64.22
Democratic	Jenn Goulet	18,931	35.78
Total votes		52,909	100.0
Republican hold			

Position 2

Washington's 9th Legislative District Position 2 election, 2018
Primary election
Party	Candidate	Votes	%
Republican	Joe Schmick (incumbent) (Note: Listed on ballot as "GOP Party.")	18,267	60.45
Democratic	Matthew Sutherland	11,950	39.55
Total votes		30,217	100.0
General election
Republican	Joe Schmick (incumbent)	31,749	60.54
Democratic	Matthew Sutherland	20,697	39.46
Total votes		52,446	100.0
Republican hold			

=== District 10 ===
Position 1

Washington's 10th Legislative District Position 1 election, 2018
Primary election
Party	Candidate	Votes	%
Democratic	Scott McMullen	21,584	50.65
Republican	Norma Smith (incumbent)	21,031	49.35
Total votes		42,615	100.0
General election
Republican	Norma Smith (incumbent)	37,803	52.16
Democratic	Scott McMullen	34,669	47.84
Total votes		72,472	100.0
Republican hold			

Position 2

Washington's 10th Legislative District Position 2 election, 2018
Primary election
Party	Candidate	Votes	%
Democratic	Dave Paul	22,259	52.86
Republican	Dave Hayes (incumbent)	19,848	47.14
Total votes		42,107	100.0
General election
Democratic	Dave Paul	36,428	50.47
Republican	Dave Hayes (incumbent)	35,743	49.53
Total votes		72,171	100.0
Democratic gain from Republican			

=== District 11 ===
Position 1

Washington's 11th Legislative District Position 1 election, 2018
Primary election
Party	Candidate	Votes	%
Democratic	Zack Hudgins (incumbent)	18,948	100.0
Total votes		18,948	100.0
General election
Democratic	Zack Hudgins (incumbent)	36,327	100.0
Total votes		36,237	100.0
Democratic hold			

Position 2

Washington's 11th Legislative District Position 2 election, 2018
Primary election
Party	Candidate	Votes	%
Democratic	Steve Bergquist (incumbent)	19,019	100.0
Total votes		19,019	100.0
General election
Democratic	Steve Bergquist (incumbent)	36,300	100.0
Total votes		36,300	100.0
Democratic hold			

=== District 12 ===
Position 1

Washington's 12th Legislative District Position 1 election, 2018
Primary election
Party	Candidate	Votes	%
Republican	Keith Goehner	15,280	44.75
Independent	Ann Diamond	10,398	30.45
Democratic	C. Keiki Stacy Weigle	5,244	15.36
Republican	JD Greening	3,227	9.45
Total votes		34,149	100.0
General election
Republican	Keith Goehner	32,598	55.69
Independent	Ann Diamond	25,938	44.31
Total votes		58,536	100.0
Republican hold			

Position 2

Washington's 12th Legislative District Position 2 election, 2018
Primary election
Party	Candidate	Votes	%
Republican	Mike Steele (incumbent)	20,323	60.79
Democratic	Valerie Sarratt	10,831	32.40
Independent	Alan Fahnestock	2,275	6.81
Total votes		33,429	100.0
General election
Republican	Mike Steele (incumbent)	37,223	63.81
Democratic	Valerie Sarratt	21,114	36.19
Total votes		58,337	100.0
Republican hold			

=== District 13 ===
Position 1

Washington's 13th Legislative District Position 1 election, 2018
Primary election
Party	Candidate	Votes	%
Republican	Tom Dent (incumbent)	19,685	70.45
Democratic	Jesse Hegstrom Oakey	8,258	29.55
Total votes		27,943	100.0
General election
Republican	Tom Dent (incumbent)	35,233	71.38
Democratic	Jesse Hegstrom Oakey	14,130	28.62
Total votes		49,363	100.0
Republican hold			

Position 2

Washington's 13th Legislative District Position 2 election, 2018
Primary election
Party	Candidate	Votes	%
Republican	Matt Manweller (incumbent)	17,802	63.48
Democratic	Sylvia Hammond	10,242	36.52
Total votes		28,044	100.0
General election
Republican	Matt Manweller (incumbent)	29,811	61.14
Democratic	Sylvia Hammond	18,951	38.86
Total votes		48,762	100.0
Republican hold			

=== District 14 ===
Position 1

Washington's 14th Legislative District Position 1 election, 2018
Primary election
Party	Candidate	Votes	%
Republican	Chris Corry	11,879	40.80
Democratic	Sasha Bentley	9,500	32.63
Republican	Kathy Coffey	6,262	21.51
Democratic	Earl Steven Lee	1,475	5.07
Total votes		29,116	100.0
General election
Republican	Chris Corry	30,763	58.75
Democratic	Sasha Bentley	21,599	41.25
Total votes		52,362	100.0
Republican hold			

Position 2

Washington's 14th Legislative District Position 2 election, 2018
Primary election
Party	Candidate	Votes	%
Republican	Gina Mosbrucker (incumbent)	17,265	60.14
Democratic	Liz Hallock	8,123	28.29
Democratic	Noah Ramirez	3,322	11.57
Total votes		28,710	100.0
General election
Republican	Gina Mosbrucker (incumbent)	31,885	61.01
Democratic	Liz Hallock	20,374	38.99
Total votes		52,259	100.0
Republican hold			

=== District 15 ===
Position 1

Washington's 15th Legislative District Position 1 election, 2018
Primary election
Party	Candidate	Votes	%
Republican	Bruce Chandler (incumbent)	11,882	66.39
Democratic	Jack McEntire	6,014	33.61
Total votes		17,896	100.0
General election
Republican	Bruce Chandler (incumbent)	20,027	59.71
Democratic	Jack McEntire	13,513	40.29
Total votes		33,540	100.0
Republican hold			

Position 2

Washington's 15th Legislative District Position 2 election, 2018
Primary election
Party	Candidate	Votes	%
Republican	Jeremie Dufault	8,270	45.73
Democratic	A.J. Cooper	4,702	26.00
Republican	David V. Taylor (incumbent)	4,188	23.16
Independent	Mario Martinez	925	5.11
Total votes		18,085	100.0
General election
Republican	Jeremie Dufault	20,275	60.56
Democratic	A.J. Cooper	13,202	39.44
Total votes		33,477	100.0
Republican hold			

=== District 16 ===
Position 1

Washington's 16th Legislative District Position 1 election, 2018
Primary election
Party	Candidate	Votes	%
Republican	Bill Jenkin (incumbent)	17,169	63.52
Democratic	Everett Maroon	9,860	36.48
Total votes		27,029	100.0
General election
Republican	Bill Jenkin (incumbent)	29,914	62.66
Democratic	Everett Maroon	17,826	37.34
Total votes		47,740	100.0
Republican hold			

Position 2

Washington's 16th Legislative District Position 2 election, 2018
Primary election
Party	Candidate	Votes	%
Democratic	Rebecca Francik	10,187	37.97
Republican	Skyler Rude	9,847	36.71
Republican	Dan Mildon	6,794	25.32
Total votes		26,828	100.0
General election
Republican	Skyler Rude	29,157	60.92
Democratic	Rebecca Francik	18,705	39.08
Total votes		47,862	100.0
Republican hold			

=== District 17 ===
Position 1

Washington's 17th Legislative District Position 1 election, 2018
Primary election
Party	Candidate	Votes	%
Republican	Vicki Kraft (incumbent)	14,459	49.17
Democratic	Tanisha Harris	12,795	43.51
Democratic	James Tolson	2,154	7.32
Total votes		29,408	100.0
General election
Republican	Vicki Kraft (incumbent)	29,807	50.73
Democratic	Tanisha Harris	28,948	49.27
Total votes		58,755	100.0
Republican hold			

Position 2

Washington's 17th Legislative District Position 2 election, 2018
Primary election
Party	Candidate	Votes	%
Republican	Paul Harris (incumbent)	15,907	54.92
Democratic	Damion E. Jiles, Sr.	13,059	45.08
Total votes		28,966	100.0
General election
Republican	Paul Harris (incumbent)	33,580	57.63
Democratic	Damion E. Jiles, Sr.	24,686	42.37
Total votes		58,266	100.0
Republican hold			

=== District 18 ===
Position 1

Washington's 18th Legislative District Position 1 election, 2018
Primary election
Party	Candidate	Votes	%
Republican	Brandon Vick (incumbent)	18,748	51.89
Democratic	Chris Thobaben	17,385	48.11
Total votes		36,133	100.0
General election
Republican	Brandon Vick (incumbent)	39,434	55.65
Democratic	Chris Thobaben	31,427	44.35
Total votes		70,861	100.0
Republican hold			

Position 2

Washington's 18th Legislative District Position 2 election, 2018
Primary election
Party	Candidate	Votes	%
Democratic	Kathy Gillespie	18,883	52.12
Republican	Larry A. Hoff	17,350	47.88
Total votes		36,233	100.0
General election
Republican	Larry A. Hoff	37,429	52.75
Democratic	Kathy Gillespie	33,528	47.25
Total votes		70,957	100.0
Republican hold			

=== District 19 ===
Position 1

Washington's 19th Legislative District Position 1 election, 2018
Primary election
Party	Candidate	Votes	%
Republican	Jim Walsh (incumbent)	17,605	50.19
Democratic	Erin Frasier	17,469	49.81
Total votes		35,074	100.0
General election
Republican	Jim Walsh (incumbent)	28,569	50.43
Democratic	Erin Frasier	28,085	49.57
Total votes		56,654	100.0
Republican hold			

Position 2

Washington's 19th Legislative District Position 2 election, 2018
Primary election
Party	Candidate	Votes	%
Democratic	Brian Blake (incumbent)	20,067	58.31
Republican	Joel McEntire	7,498	21.79
Republican	David Parsons	6,852	19.91
Total votes		34,417	100.0
General election
Democratic	Brian Blake (incumbent)	30,405	54.04
Republican	Joel McEntire	25,860	45.96
Total votes		56,265	100.0
Democratic hold			

=== District 20 ===
Position 1

Washington's 20th Legislative District Position 1 election, 2018
Primary election
Party	Candidate	Votes	%
Republican	Richard DeBolt (incumbent)	19,564	60.31
Democratic	John Thompson	12,874	39.69
Total votes		32,438	100.0
General election
Republican	Richard DeBolt (incumbent)	38,225	62.06
Democratic	John Thompson	23,365	37.94
Total votes		61,590	100.0
Republican hold			

Position 2

Washington's 20th Legislative District Position 2 election, 2018
Primary election
Party	Candidate	Votes	%
Republican	Ed Orcutt (incumbent)	18,893	56.73
Democratic	Brennan Bailey	11,376	34.16
Independent	Mark Smith	3,032	9.11
Total votes		33,301	100.0
General election
Republican	Ed Orcutt (incumbent)	39,992	63.95
Democratic	Brennan Bailey	22,548	36.05
Total votes		62,540	100.0
Republican hold			

=== District 21 ===
Position 1

Washington's 21st Legislative District Position 1 election, 2018
Primary election
Party	Candidate	Votes	%
Democratic	Strom Peterson (incumbent)	20,498	66.64
Republican	Amy Schaper	10,262	33.36
Total votes		30,760	100.0
General election
Democratic	Strom Peterson (incumbent)	39,007	65.76
Republican	Amy Schaper	20,309	34.24
Total votes		59,316	100.0
Democratic hold			

Position 2

Washington's 21st Legislative District Position 2 election, 2018
Primary election
Party	Candidate	Votes	%
Democratic	Lillian Ortiz-Self (incumbent)	20,597	66.23
Republican	Petra Bigea	10,501	33.77
Total votes		31,098	100.0
General election
Democratic	Lillian Ortiz-Self (incumbent)	38,626	65.4
Republican	Petra Bigea	20,439	34.6
Total votes		59,065	100.0
Democratic hold			

=== District 22 ===
Position 1

Washington's 22nd Legislative District Position 1 election, 2018
Primary election
Party	Candidate	Votes	%
Democratic	Laurie Dolan (incumbent)	28,403	75.68
Independent	C. Davis	9,125	24.32
Total votes		37,528	100.0
General election
Democratic	Laurie Dolan (incumbent)	47,261	70.22
Independent	C. Davis	20,046	29.78
Total votes		67,307	100.0
Democratic hold			

Position 2

Washington's 22nd Legislative District Position 2 election, 2018
Primary election
Party	Candidate	Votes	%
Democratic	Beth Doglio (incumbent)	28,425	77.36
Libertarian	Allen Acosta	8,321	22.64
Total votes		36,746	100.0
General election
Democratic	Beth Doglio (incumbent)	46,275	69.66
Libertarian	Allen Acosta	20,151	30.34
Total votes		66,426	100.0
Democratic hold			

=== District 23 ===
Position 1

Washington's 23rd Legislative District Position 1 election, 2018
Primary election
Party	Candidate	Votes	%
Democratic	Sherry Appleton (incumbent)	22,328	63.73
Independent	Becky Erickson	12,706	36.27
Total votes		35,034	100.0
General election
Democratic	Sherry Appleton (incumbent)	37,982	58.98
Independent	Becky Erickson	26,412	41.02
Total votes		64,394	100.0
Democratic hold			

Position 2

Washington's 23rd Legislative District Position 2 election, 2018
Primary election
Party	Candidate	Votes	%
Democratic	Drew Hansen (incumbent)	26,504	100.0
Total votes		26,504	100.0
General election
Democratic	Drew Hansen (incumbent)	48,232	100.0
Total votes		48,232	100.0
Democratic hold			

=== District 24 ===
Position 1

Washington's 24th Legislative District Position 1 election, 2018
Primary election
Party	Candidate	Votes	%
Democratic	Mike Chapman (incumbent)	29,069	60.21
Republican	Jodi Wilke	19,208	39.79
Total votes		48,277	100.0
General election
Democratic	Mike Chapman (incumbent)	43,504	57.98
Republican	Jodi Wilke	31,525	42.02
Total votes		75,029	100.0
Democratic hold			

Position 2

Washington's 24th Legislative District Position 2 election, 2018
Primary election
Party	Candidate	Votes	%
Democratic	Steve Tharinger (incumbent)	28,080	58.80
Republican	Jim McEntire	19,676	41.20
Total votes		47,756	100.0
General election
Democratic	Steve Tharinger (incumbent)	41,630	55.75
Republican	Jim McEntire	33,041	44.25
Total votes		74,671	100.0
Democratic hold			

=== District 25 ===
Position 1

Washington's 25th Legislative District Position 1 election, 2018
Primary election
Party	Candidate	Votes	%
Republican	Kelly Chambers	10,036	36.96
Democratic	Jamie Smith	7,495	27.61
Democratic	Julie L. Door	6,662	24.54
Republican	Emmett Smith	2,958	10.89
Total votes		27,151	100.0
General election
Republican	Kelly Chambers	27,561	50.56
Democratic	Jamie Smith	26,950	49.44
Total votes		54,511	100.0
Republican hold			

Position 2

Washington's 25th Legislative District Position 2 election, 2018
Primary election
Party	Candidate	Votes	%
Republican	Chris Gildon	12,533	46.60
Democratic	Brian Duthie	12,211	45.40
Independent	Ned Witting (Note: Listed on ballot as "Independent To Party.")	2,152	8.00
Total votes		26,896	100.0
General election
Republican	Chris Gildon	27,701	51.19
Democratic	Brian Duthie	26,413	48.81
Total votes		54,114	100.0
Republican hold			

=== District 26 ===
Position 1

Washington's 26th Legislative District Position 1 election, 2018
Primary election
Party	Candidate	Votes	%
Democratic	Connie FitzPatrick	19,515	48.92
Republican	Jesse Young (incumbent)	16,808	42.13
Republican	Naomi Evans	3,568	8.94
Total votes		39,891	100.0
General election
Republican	Jesse Young (incumbent)	36,120	51.87
Democratic	Connie FitzPatrick	33,513	48.13
Total votes		69,633	100.0
Republican hold			

Position 2

Washington's 26th Legislative District Position 2 election, 2018
Primary election
Party	Candidate	Votes	%
Democratic	Joy Stanford	16,775	41.77
Republican	Michelle Caldier (incumbent)	14,011	34.89
Republican	Randy Boss	7,231	18.01
Independent	Marco Padilla (Note: Listed on ballot as "People Over Party.")	2,143	5.34
Total votes		40,160	100.0
General election
Republican	Michelle Caldier (incumbent)	38,339	55.11
Democratic	Joy Stanford	31,233	44.89
Total votes		69,572	100.0
Republican hold			

=== District 27 ===
Position 1

Washington's 27th Legislative District Position 1 election, 2018
Primary election
Party	Candidate	Votes	%
Democratic	Laurie Jinkins (incumbent)	21,678	73.19
Republican	Kyle Paskewitz	7,941	26.81
Total votes		29,619	100.0
General election
Democratic	Laurie Jinkins (incumbent)	40,108	71.23
Republican	Kyle Paskewitz	16,198	28.77
Total votes		56,306	100.0
Democratic hold			

Position 2

Washington's 27th Legislative District Position 2 election, 2018
Primary election
Party	Candidate	Votes	%
Democratic	Jake Fey (incumbent)	21,575	76.73
Independent	Donald Golden	6,542	23.27
Total votes		28,117	100.0
General election
Democratic	Jake Fey (incumbent)	39,243	72.35
Independent	Donald Golden	14,999	27.65
Total votes		54,242	100.0
Democratic hold			

=== District 28 ===
Position 1

Washington's 28th Legislative District Position 1 election, 2018
Primary election
Party	Candidate	Votes	%
Democratic	Mari Leavitt	15,724	53.20
Republican	Dick Muri (incumbent)	13,830	46.80
Total votes		29,554	100.0
General election
Democratic	Mari Leavitt	27,735	52.8
Republican	Dick Muri (incumbent)	24,789	47.2
Total votes		52,524	100.0
Democratic gain from Republican			

Position 2

Washington's 28th Legislative District Position 2 election, 2018
Primary election
Party	Candidate	Votes	%
Democratic	Christine Kilduff (incumbent)	17,253	58.63
Republican	Maia Espinoza	12,174	41.37
Total votes		29,427	100.0
General election
Democratic	Christine Kilduff (incumbent)	29,955	57.48
Republican	Maia Espinoza	22,162	42.52
Total votes		52,117	100.0
Democratic hold			

=== District 29 ===
Position 1

Washington's 29th Legislative District Position 1 election, 2018
Primary election
Party	Candidate	Votes	%
Democratic	Melanie Morgan	7,125	41.51
Republican	Terry Harder	4,231	24.65
Democratic	David Sawyer (incumbent)	3,819	22.25
Republican	Janis Clark	1,991	11.6
Total votes		17,166	100.0
General election
Democratic	Melanie Morgan	22,817	61.03
Republican	Terry Harder	14,567	38.97
Total votes		37,384	100.0
Democratic hold			

Position 2

Washington's 29th Legislative District Position 2 election, 2018
Primary election
Party	Candidate	Votes	%
Democratic	Steve Kirby (incumbent)	12,043	100.0
Total votes		12,043	100.0
General election
Democratic	Steve Kirby (incumbent)	28,180	100.0
Total votes		28,180	100.0
Democratic hold			

=== District 30 ===
Position 1

Washington's 30th Legislative District Position 1 election, 2018
Primary election
Party	Candidate	Votes	%
Democratic	Mike Pellicciotti (incumbent)	15,043	58.95
Republican	Linda Kochmar	10,474	41.05
Total votes		25,517	100.0
General election
Democratic	Mike Pellicciotti (incumbent)	28,563	61.23
Republican	Linda Kochmar	18,085	38.77
Total votes		46,648	100.0
Democratic hold			

Position 2

Washington's 30th Legislative District Position 2 election, 2018
Primary election
Party	Candidate	Votes	%
Democratic	Kristine Reeves (incumbent)	15,747	62.87
Republican	Mark Greene (Note: Listed on ballot as "G.O.P. Party.")	9,298	37.13
Total votes		25,045	100.0
General election
Democratic	Kristine Reeves (incumbent)	29,635	64.24
Republican	Mark Greene	16,499	35.76
Total votes		46,134	100.0
Democratic hold			

=== District 31 ===
Position 1

Washington's 31st Legislative District Position 1 e, 2018
Primary election
Party	Candidate	Votes	%
Republican	Drew Stokesbary (incumbent)	17,966	56.33
Democratic	Victoria Mena	13,929	43.67
Total votes		31,895	100.0
General election
Republican	Drew Stokesbary (incumbent)	36,844	58.92
Democratic	Victoria Mena	25,688	41.08
Total votes		62,532	100.0
Republican hold			

Position 2

Washington's 31st Legislative District Position 2 election, 2018
Primary election
Party	Candidate	Votes	%
Republican	Morgan Irwin (incumbent)	17,353	54.45
Democratic	Mark Boswell	12,814	40.21
Independent	Steve Skutt	1,702	5.34
Total votes		31,869	100.0
General election
Republican	Morgan Irwin (incumbent)	36,467	58.53
Democratic	Mark Boswell	25,839	41.47
Total votes		62,306	100.0
Republican hold			

=== District 32 ===
Position 1

Washington's 32nd Legislative District Position 1 election, 2018
Primary election
Party	Candidate	Votes	%
Democratic	Cindy Ryu (incumbent)	27,207	72.49
Republican	Diodato (Dio) Boucsieguez	8,003	21.32
Independent	Keith Smith (Note: Listed on ballot as "Centrist Party.")	2,324	6.19
Total votes		37,534	100.0
General election
Democratic	Cindy Ryu (incumbent)	49,413	75.89
Republican	Diodato (Dio) Boucsieguez	15,699	24.11
Total votes		65,112	100.0
Democratic hold			

Position 2

Washington's 32nd Legislative District Position 2 election, 2018
Primary election
Party	Candidate	Votes	%
Democratic	Lauren Davis	19,821	52.88
Republican	Frank Deisler	8,913	23.78
Democratic	Chris Roberts	8,751	23.35
Total votes		37,485	100.0
General election
Democratic	Lauren Davis	48,199	74.31
Republican	Frank Deisler	16,659	25.69
Total votes		64,858	100.0
Democratic hold			

=== District 33 ===
Position 1

Washington's 33rd Legislative District Position 1 Election, 2018
Primary election
Party	Candidate	Votes	%
Democratic	Tina L. Orwall (incumbent)	18,201	100.0
Total votes		18,201	100.0
General election
Democratic	Tina L. Orwall (incumbent)	34,527	100.0
Total votes		34,527	100.0
Democratic hold			

Position 2

Washington's 33rd Legislative District Position 2 Election, 2018
Primary election
Party	Candidate	Votes	%
Democratic	Mia Su-Ling Gregerson (incumbent)	15,992	66.51
Republican	Anthony L. Lamb	8,053	33.49
Total votes		24,045	100.0
General election
Democratic	Mia Su-Ling Gregerson (incumbent)	30,562	67.86
Republican	Anthony L. Lamb	14,474	32.14
Total votes		45,036	100.0
Democratic hold			

=== District 34 ===
Position 1

Washington's 34th Legislative District Position 1 Election, 2018
Primary election
Party	Candidate	Votes	%
Democratic	Eileen L. Cody (incumbent)	35,619	100.0
Total votes		35,619	100.0
General election
Democratic	Eileen L. Cody (incumbent)	57,127	100.0
Total votes		57,127	100.0
Democratic hold			

Position 2

Washington's 34th Legislative District Position 2 Election, 2018
Primary election
Party	Candidate	Votes	%
Democratic	Joe Fitzgibbon (incumbent)	35,410	100.0
Total votes		35,410	100.0
General election
Democratic	Joe Fitzgibbon (incumbent)	56,332	100.0
Total votes		56,332	100.0
Democratic hold			

=== District 35 ===
Position 1

Washington's 35th Legislative District Position 1 Election, 2018
Primary election
Party	Candidate	Votes	%
Republican	Dan Griffey (incumbent)	19,606	52.91
Democratic	James Thomas	17,450	47.09
Total votes		37,056	100.0
General election
Republican	Dan Griffey (incumbent)	37,575	57.73
Democratic	James Thomas	27,507	42.27
Total votes		65,082	100.0
Republican hold			

Position 2

Washington's 35th Legislative District Position 2 Election, 2018
Primary election
Party	Candidate	Votes	%
Democratic	David Daggett	18,674	50.63
Republican	Drew C. MacEwen (incumbent)	18,206	49.37
Total votes		36,880	100.0
General election
Republican	Drew C. MacEwen (incumbent)	33,320	51.22
Democratic	David Daggett	31,738	48.78
Total votes		65,058	100.0
Republican hold			

=== District 36 ===
Position 1

Washington's 36th Legislative District Position 1 Election, 2018
Primary election
Party	Candidate	Votes	%
Democratic	Noel Christina Frame (incumbent)	44,691	89.13
Libertarian	Sydney Gillman Wissel	5,448	10.87
Total votes		50,139	100.0
General election
Democratic	Noel Christina Frame (incumbent)	77,571	88.62
Libertarian	Sydney Gillman Wissel	9,958	11.38
Total votes		87,529	100.0
Democratic hold			

Position 2

Washington's 36th Legislative District Position 2 Election, 2018
Primary election
Party	Candidate	Votes	%
Democratic	Gael Tarleton (incumbent)	43,785	86.83
Libertarian	Matt Dubin	6,644	13.17
Total votes		50,429	100.0
General election
Democratic	Gael Tarleton (incumbent)	75,390	86.07
Libertarian	Matt Dubin	12,205	13.93
Total votes		87,595	100.0
Democratic hold			

=== District 37 ===
Position 1

Washington's 37th Legislative District Position 1 Election, 2018
Primary election
Party	Candidate	Votes	%
Democratic	Sharon Tomiko Santos (incumbent)	31,940	100.0
Total votes		31,940	100.0
General election
Democratic	Sharon Tomiko Santos (incumbent)	54,218	100.0
Total votes		54,218	100.0
Democratic hold			

Position 2

Washington's 37th Legislative District Position 2 Election, 2018
Primary election
Party	Candidate	Votes	%
Democratic	Eric Pettigrew (incumbent)	31,627	89.09
Independent	Tamra Smilanich	2,793	7.87
Independent	John Dickinson	1,080	3.04
Total votes		35,500	100.0
General election
Democratic	Eric Pettigrew (incumbent)	55,127	88.52
Independent	Tamra Smilanich	7,152	11.48
Total votes		62,279	100.0
Democratic hold			

=== District 38 ===
Position 1

Washington's 38th Legislative District Position 1 Election, 2018
Primary election
Party	Candidate	Votes	%
Democratic	June Robinson (incumbent)	16,071	67.45
Independent	Bert Johnson	7,757	32.55
Total votes		23,828	100.0
General election
Democratic	June Robinson (incumbent)	29,441	61.42
Independent	Bert Johnson	18,490	38.58
Total votes		47,931	100.0
Democratic hold			

Position 2

Washington's 38th Legislative District Position 2 Election, 2018
Primary election
Party	Candidate	Votes	%
Democratic	Mike Sells (incumbent)	18,525	100.0
Total votes		18,525	100.0
General election
Democratic	Mike Sells (incumbent)	35,651	100.0
Total votes		35,651	100.0
Democratic hold			

=== District 39 ===
Position 1

Washington's 39th Legislative District Position 1 Election, 2018
Primary election
Party	Candidate	Votes	%
Democratic	Ivan Lewis	13,692	45.84
Republican	Robert J. Sutherland	11,800	39.51
Republican	Randy J. Hayden	4,375	14.65
Total votes		29,867	100.0
General election
Republican	Robert J. Sutherland	33,399	56.53
Democratic	Ivan Lewis	25,682	43.47
Total votes		59,081	100.0
Republican hold			

Position 2

Washington's 39th Legislative District Position 2 Election, 2018
Primary election
Party	Candidate	Votes	%
Republican	Carolyn Eslick (incumbent)	16,485	54.78
Democratic	Eric Halvorson	13,607	45.22
Total votes		30,092	100.0
General election
Republican	Carolyn Eslick (incumbent)	34,278	58.07
Democratic	Eric Halvorson	24,750	41.93
Total votes		59,028	100.0
Republican hold			

=== District 40 ===
Position 1

Washington's 40th Legislative District Position 1 Election, 2018
Primary election
Party	Candidate	Votes	%
Democratic	Debra Lekanoff	11,323	28.19
Republican	Michael Petrish	8,446	21.03
Democratic	Alex Ramel	7,684	19.13
Democratic	Rud Browne	7,394	18.41
Republican	Daniel Miller	2,686	6.69
Democratic	Tom Pasma	2,629	6.55
Total votes		40,162	100.0
General election
Democratic	Debra Lekanoff	48,153	67.02
Republican	Michael Petrish	23,692	32.98
Total votes		71,845	100.0
Democratic hold			

Position 2

Washington's 40th Legislative District Position 2 Election, 2018
Primary election
Party	Candidate	Votes	%
Democratic	Jeff Morris (incumbent)	28,016	100.0
Total votes		28,016	100.0
General election
Democratic	Jeff Morris (incumbent)	52,847	100.0
Total votes		52,847	100.0
Democratic hold			

=== District 41 ===
Position 1

Washington's 41st Legislative District Position 1 Election, 2018
Primary election
Party	Candidate	Votes	%
Democratic	Tana Senn (incumbent)	25,894	64.54
Republican	Tim Cruickshank	13,408	33.42
Libertarian	Nathaniel Deily	818	2.04
Total votes		40,120	100.0
General election
Democratic	Tana Senn (incumbent)	45,408	65.26
Republican	Tim Cruickshank	24,175	34.74
Total votes		69,583	100.0
Democratic hold			

Position 2

Washington's 41st Legislative District Position 2 Election, 2018
Primary election
Party	Candidate	Votes	%
Democratic	My-Linh Thai	17,144	42.96
Republican	Michael Appleby	12,581	31.52
Democratic	Wendy Weiker	10,185	25.52
Total votes		39,910	100.0
General election
Democratic	My-Linh Thai	45,476	65.56
Republican	Michael Appleby	23,885	34.44
Total votes		69,361	100.0
Democratic hold			

=== District 42 ===
Position 1

Washington's 42nd Legislative District Position 1 Election, 2018
Primary election
Party	Candidate	Votes	%
Democratic	Justin Boneau	21,125	50.74
Republican	Luanne Van Werven (incumbent)	18,440	44.29
Republican	Dean Berkeley	2,070	4.97
Total votes		41,635	100.0
General election
Republican	Luanne Van Werven (incumbent)	36,242	50.06
Democratic	Justin Boneau	36,162	49.94
Total votes		72,404	100.0
Republican hold			

Position 2

Washington's 42nd Legislative District Position 2 Election, 2018
Primary election
Party	Candidate	Votes	%
Democratic	Sharon Shewmake	21,733	52.28
Republican	Vincent Buys (incumbent)	19,837	47.72
Total votes		41,570	100.0
General election
Democratic	Sharon Shewmake	36,704	50.68
Republican	Vincent Buys (incumbent)	35,723	49.32
Total votes		72,427	100.0
Democratic gain from Republican			

=== District 43 ===
Position 1

Washington's 43rd Legislative District Position 1 Election, 2018
Primary election
Party	Candidate	Votes	%
Democratic	Nicole Macri (incumbent)	42,610	91.15
Republican	John Peeples	4,139	8.85
Total votes		46,749	100.0
General election
Democratic	Nicole Macri (incumbent)	76,046	91.13
Republican	John Peeples	7,403	8.87
Total votes		83,449	100.0
Democratic hold			

Position 2

Washington's 43rd Legislative District Position 2 Election, 2018
Primary election
Party	Candidate	Votes	%
Democratic	Frank Chopp (incumbent)	41,067	87.64
Republican	Claire Torstenbo	4,169	8.90
Independent	Boris Joffe	1,625	3.47
Total votes		46,861	100.0
General election
Democratic	Frank Chopp (incumbent)	74,155	89.36
Republican	Claire Torstenbo	8,828	10.64
Total votes		82,983	100.0
Democratic hold			

=== District 44 ===
Position 1

Washington's 44th Legislative District Position 1 Election, 2018
Primary election
Party	Candidate	Votes	%
Democratic	John Lovick (incumbent)	19,992	57.19
Republican	Jeff Sax	14,964	42.81
Total votes		34,956	100.0
General election
Democratic	John Lovick (incumbent)	38,194	57.06
Republican	Jeff Sax	28,742	42.94
Total votes		66,936	100.0
Democratic hold			

Position 2

Washington's 44th Legislative District Position 2 Election, 2018
Primary election
Party	Candidate	Votes	%
Democratic	Jared M. Mead	18,871	53.34
Republican	Mark Harmsworth (incumbent)	16,511	46.66
Total votes		35,382	100.0
General election
Democratic	Jared M. Mead	34,873	52.23
Republican	Mark Harmsworth (incumbent)	31,901	47.77
Total votes		66,774	100.0
Democratic gain from Republican			

=== District 45 ===
Position 1

Washington's 45th Legislative District Position 1 Election, 2018
Primary election
Party	Candidate	Votes	%
Democratic	Roger Goodman (incumbent)	27,505	67.74
Republican	Michael Curtis	13,096	32.26
Total votes		40,601	100.0
General election
Democratic	Roger Goodman (incumbent)	47,690	67.45
Republican	Michael Curtis	23,016	32.55
Total votes		70,706	100.0
Democratic hold			

Position 2

Washington's 45th Legislative District Position 2 Election, 2018
Primary election
Party	Candidate	Votes	%
Democratic	Larry Springer (incumbent)	27,501	67.85
Republican	Amber Krabach	13,031	32.15
Total votes		40,532	100.0
General election
Democratic	Larry Springer (incumbent)	47,674	67.55
Republican	Amber Krabach	22,904	32.45
Total votes		70,578	100.0
Democratic hold			

=== District 46 ===
Position 1

Washington's 46th Legislative District Position 1 Election, 2018
Primary election
Party	Candidate	Votes	%
Democratic	Gerry Pollet (incumbent)	39,569	83.31
Republican	Jeff Patton	7,929	16.69
Total votes		47,498	100.0
General election
Democratic	Gerry Pollet (incumbent)	65,206	82.73
Republican	Jeff Patton	13,615	17.27
Total votes		78,821	100.0
Democratic hold			

Position 2

Washington's 46th Legislative District Position 2 Election, 2018
Primary election
Party	Candidate	Votes	%
Democratic	Javier Valdez (incumbent)	39,571	83.56
Republican	Jerry Zeiger-Buccola	7,783	16.44
Total votes		47,354	100.0
General election
Democratic	Javier Valdez (incumbent)	65,383	83.45
Republican	Jerry Zeiger-Buccola	12,971	16.55
Total votes		78,354	100.0
Democratic hold			

=== District 47 ===
Position 1

Washington's 47th Legislative District Position 1 Election, 2018
Primary election
Party	Candidate	Votes	%
Republican	Mark Hargrove (incumbent)	14,719	49.03
Democratic	Debra Entenman	14,430	48.07
Independent	James Dillon	871	2.90
Total votes		30,020	100.0
General election
Democratic	Debra Entenman	29,911	53.52
Republican	Mark Hargrove (incumbent)	25,981	46.48
Total votes		55,892	100.0
Democratic gain from Republican			

Position 2

Washington's 47th Legislative District Position 2 Election, 2018
Primary election
Party	Candidate	Votes	%
Democratic	Pat Sullivan (incumbent)	17,394	58.23
Republican	Ted Cooke	7,230	24.21
Republican	Lindsey Shumway	5,245	17.56
Total votes		29,869	100.0
General election
Democratic	Pat Sullivan (incumbent)	34,915	62.81
Republican	Ted Cooke	20,671	37.19
Total votes		55,586	100.0
Democratic hold			

=== District 48 ===
Position 1

Washington's 48th Legislative District Position 1 Election, 2018
Primary election
Party	Candidate	Votes	%
Democratic	Vandana Slatter (incumbent)	23,074	100.0
Total votes		23,074	100.0
General election
Democratic	Vandana Slatter (incumbent)	40,408	100.0
Total votes		40,408	100.0
Democratic hold			

Position 2

Washington's 48th Legislative District Position 2 Election, 2018
Primary election
Party	Candidate	Votes	%
Democratic	Amy Walen	19,758	76.14
Democratic	Cindi Bright	6,190	23.86
Total votes		25,948	100.0
General election
Democratic	Amy Walen	34,143	73.00
Democratic	Cindi Bright	12,628	27.00
Total votes		46,771	100.0
Democratic hold			

=== District 49 ===
Position 1

Washington's 49th Legislative District Position 1 Election, 2018
Primary election
Party	Candidate	Votes	%
Democratic	Sharon Wylie (incumbent)	21,439	100.0
Total votes		21,439	100.0
General election
Democratic	Sharon Wylie (incumbent)	40,080	100.0
Total votes		40,080	100.0
Democratic hold			

Position 2

Washington's 49th Legislative District Position 2 Election, 2018
Primary election
Party	Candidate	Votes	%
Democratic	Monica Jurado Stonier (incumbent)	21,419	100.0
Total votes		21,419	100.0
General election
Democratic	Monica Jurado Stonier (incumbent)	40,087	100.0
Total votes		40,087	100.0
Democratic hold			

== See also ==
- United States elections, 2018
- United States House of Representatives elections in Washington, 2018
- United States Senate election in Washington, 2018
- Washington State Senate election, 2018
