= 2012 Washington House of Representatives election =

Washington State House elections, 2012
- November 6, 2012

98 seats of the Washington State House of Representatives 50 seats needed for a majority
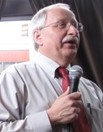

	Majority party	Minority party
Leader	Frank Chopp	Richard DeBolt
Party	Democratic	Republican
Leader's seat	43rd-Seattle	20th-Centralia
Last election	56	42
Seats won	55	43
Seat change	▼1	▲1
Popular vote	2,892,897	2,403,343
Percentage	53.3%	44.3%
Swing	▲6.4%	▼7.3%
- Results: Democratic gain Republican gain Democratic hold Republican hold
House Speaker before election
Frank Chopp
Democratic
Elected House Speaker
Frank Chopp
Democratic

The Washington State House elections, 2012 had primaries held on August 7, 2012 and general elections held on November 6, 2012 determining who will represent each of the 49 Legislative Districts in the state of Washington in the Washington State House of Representatives. Each district elects two representatives who are elected for two-year terms.

A top two primary election on August 7, 2012, determined which two candidates would appear on the November ballot. Candidate were allowed to write in their party preference.

== Overview ==
=== Results ===
Washington State House Elections, 2012 Primary election — August 7, 2012
Party	Votes	Percentage	Candidates	Advancing to general	Seats contesting
Democratic	1,643,961	52.55%	131	87	
Republican	1,442,681	46.11%	129	83	
Independent	36,313	1.16%	15	6	
Green	5,568	0.18%	1	0	0
Totals	3,128,523	100.00%	276		—

Washington State House Elections, 2012 General election — November 6, 2012
Party	Votes	Percentage	Seats	+/–
Democratic	2,892,897	53.33%	55	▼1
Republican	2,403,343	44.30%	43	▲1
Independent	114,299	2.11%	0	Steady
Green	14,333	0.26%	0	Steady
Totals	5,424,872	100.00%	98	—

=== Composition ===
No Party Change	Seats
Democratic Incumbent, Uncontested	7
Two Democrats in General	6
Total Democratic	13
Republican Incumbent, Uncontested	9
Two Republicans in General	6
Total Republican	15
Total	28

Races with Democratic Incumbent	Seats
Uncontested	7
Contested, vs Democrat	3
Contested, vs Republican	26
Contested, vs Independent	5
Contested, vs Green	1
Contested, vs Socialist	1
Total	43

Races with Republican Incumbent	Seats
Uncontested	9
Contested, vs Republican	4
Contested, vs Democrat	19
Total	32

Open Races	Seats
Republican vs Democrat	18
Democrat vs Democrat	3
Republican vs Republican	2
Total	23

== Predictions ==
Source	Ranking	As of
Governing	Likely D	October 24, 2012

== Select Nonpartisan Blanket Primary Results ==
District 1

Washington's 1st legislative district House 1 primary election, 2012
Party	Candidate	Votes	%
Democratic	Derek Stanford	13,388	46.47
Democratic	Greg Rankich	2,567	8.91
Republican	Brian Travis	5,129	17.8
Republican	Sandy Guinn	7,726	26.82
Invalid or blank votes			
Total votes		27,129	100.00
Turnout			

Washington's 1st legislative district House 2 primary election, 2012
Party	Candidate	Votes	%
Democratic	Luis Moscoso	19,798	97.31
Independent	Mark T. Davies (Note: Write-in)	548	2.69
Invalid or blank votes			
Total votes		20,346	100.00
Turnout			

District 2

Washington's 2nd legislative district House 1 primary election, 2012
Party	Candidate	Votes	%
Republican	Gary Alexander	13,501	58.76
Democratic	Greg Hartman	9,477	41.24
Invalid or blank votes			
Total votes			100.00
Turnout			

District 3

Washington's 3rd legislative district House 1 primary election, 2012
Party	Candidate	Votes	%
Republican	Tim Benn (Note: Prefers G.O.P Party)	4,868	21.6
Democratic	Marcus Riccelli	6,277	27.85
Democratic	Bob Apple	4,086	18.13
Democratic	Jon Snyder	4,317	19.15
Republican	Morgan Oyler	2,993	13.28
Invalid or blank votes			
Total votes		22,541	100.00
Turnout			

District 5

Washington's 5th legislative district House 2 primary election, 2012
Party	Candidate	Votes	%
Independent	Ryan Dean Burkett (Note: Prefers "No Party Preference")	1,202	4.39
Democratic	David Spring	11,526	42.09
Republican	Chad Magendanz	14,654	53.52
Invalid or blank votes			
Total votes		27,382	100.00
Turnout			

District 6

Washington's 6th legislative district House 1 primary election, 2012
Party	Candidate	Votes	%
Republican	Representative Kevin Parker	21,398	100.00
Invalid or blank votes			
Total votes		21,398	100.00
Turnout			

Washington's 6th legislative district House 2 primary election, 2012
Party	Candidate	Votes	%
Democratic	Dennis Dellwo	12,967	41.75
Republican	Jeff Holy	9,680	31.17
Republican	Ben Oakley	5,127	16.51
Republican	Larry Keller	3,285	10.58
Invalid or blank votes			
Total votes		31,059	100.00
Turnout			

District 8

Washington's 8th legislative district House 2 primary election, 2012
Party	Candidate	Votes	%
Democratic	Richard Reuther	6,035	24.16
Republican	Representative Larry Haler	13,663	54.7
Republican	Bob Parks	5,278	21.13
Invalid or blank votes			
Total votes			100.00
Turnout			

District 11

Washington's 11th legislative district House 2 primary election, 2012
Party	Candidate	Votes	%
Democratic	Steve Bergquist	6,074	28.04
Democratic	Bobby Virk	3,040	14.03
Democratic	Stephanie Bowman	4,853	22.4
Democratic	Rob Holland	2,245	10.36
Republican	Sarah Sanoy-Wright	5,451	25.16
Invalid or blank votes			
Total votes			100.00
Turnout			

District 17

Washington's 17th legislative district House 1 primary election, 2012
Party	Candidate	Votes	%
Republican	Julie Olson	8,785	42.48
Democratic	Monica Stonier	9,390	45.4
Republican	Matthew Homola	2,506	12.12
Invalid or blank votes			
Total votes			100.00
Turnout			

District 18

Washington's 18th legislative district House 2 primary election, 2012
Party	Candidate	Votes	%
Democratic	David Shehorn	7,278	30.08
Democratic	Ryan Gompertz	2,082	8.6
Republican	Liz Pike	14,838	61.32
Invalid or blank votes			
Total votes			100.00
Turnout			

District 27

Washington's 27th legislative district House 1 primary election, 2012
Party	Candidate	Votes	%
Democratic	Laurie Jinkins	17,937	74.05
Republican	Steven T. Cook	6,285	25.95
Invalid or blank votes			
Total votes		24,222	100.00
Turnout			

Washington's 27th legislative district House 2 primary election, 2012
Party	Candidate	Votes	%
Democratic	Lauren Walker	10,639	46.83
Democratic	Jake Fey	12,078	53.17
Invalid or blank votes			
Total votes		22,717	100.00
Turnout			

District 39

Washington's 39th legislative district House 2 primary election, 2012
Party	Candidate	Votes	%
Republican	Robert G. Zimmerman	5,943	22.46
Republican	Elizabeth Scott	6,830	25.81
Republican	Robert Pilgrim	1,793	6.77
Republican	Gregory Dean Lemke	677	2.56
Democratic	Jocelynne (Josie) Fallgatter	3,492	13.19
Democratic	Eleanor Walters	7,730	29.21
Invalid or blank votes			
Total votes		26,465	100.00
Turnout			

District 46

Washington's 46th legislative district House 2 primary election, 2012
Party	Candidate	Votes	%
Democratic	Jessyn Farrell	10,560	29.97
Democratic	Dusty Hoerler	4,350	12.35
Republican	Scott M. Hodges	6,271	17.8
Democratic	Shelly Crocker	5,571	15.81
Democratic	Sarajane Siegfriedt	7,823	22.2
Independent	Stan Lippmann (Note: Prefers Democratic-Repub Party)	656	1.86
Invalid or blank votes			
Total votes		35,231	100.00
Turnout			

== General election results ==
=== District 1 ===
Washington's 1st legislative district House 1 general election, 2012
Party	Candidate	Votes	%
Republican	Sandy Guinn	24,975	42.47
Democratic	Derek Stanford (inc.)	33,838	57.53
Invalid or blank votes			
Total votes		58,813	100.00
Turnout			

Washington's 1st legislative district House 2 general election, 2012
Party	Candidate	Votes	%
Democratic	Luis Moscoso (inc.)	34,362	60.97
Independent	Mark T. Davies	22,000	39.03
Invalid or blank votes			
Total votes		56,362	100.00
Turnout			

=== District 2 ===
Washington's 2nd legislative district House 1 general election, 2012
Party	Candidate	Votes	%
Republican	Gary Alexander	29,482	58.04
Democratic	Greg Hartman	21,315	41.96
Invalid or blank votes			
Total votes		50,797	100.00
Turnout			

Washington's 2nd legislative district House 2 general election, 2012
Party	Candidate	Votes	%
Republican	J. T. Wilcox (inc.)	41,105	100.00
Invalid or blank votes			100.00
Total votes			100.00
Turnout			

=== District 3 ===
Washington's 3rd legislative district House 1 general election, 2012
Party	Candidate	Votes	%
Democratic	Marcus Riccelli	27,817	62.47
Republican	Tim Benn (Note: Prefers G.O.P Party)	16,713	37.53
Invalid or blank votes			
Total votes		44,530	100.00
Turnout			

Washington's 3rd legislative district House 2 general election, 2012
Party	Candidate	Votes	%
Republican	Dave White	17,132	38.1
Democratic	Timm Ormsby (inc.)	27,833	61.9
Invalid or blank votes			
Total votes		44,965	100.00
Turnout			

=== District 4 ===
Washington's 4th legislative district House 1 general election, 2012
Party	Candidate	Votes	%
Republican	Larry Crouse (inc.)	44,583	100.00
Invalid or blank votes			
Total votes			100.00
Turnout			

Washington's 4th legislative district House 2 general election, 2012
Party	Candidate	Votes	%
Republican	Matt Shea (inc.)	33,561	56.8
Democratic	Amy C. Biviano	25,523	43.2
Invalid or blank votes			
Total votes		59,084	100.00
Turnout			

=== District 5 ===
Washington's 5th legislative district House 1 general election, 2012
Party	Candidate	Votes	%
Republican	Jay Rodne (inc.)	42,752	100.00
Invalid or blank votes			
Total votes		42,752	100.00
Turnout			

Washington's 5th legislative district House 2 general election, 2012
Party	Candidate	Votes	%
Democratic	David Spring	29,156	44.77
Republican	Chad Magendanz	35,961	55.23
Invalid or blank votes			
Total votes		57,861	100.00
Turnout			

=== District 6 ===
Washington's 6th legislative district House 1 general election, 2012
Party	Candidate	Votes	%
Republican	Kevin Parker (inc.)	43,346	100.00
Invalid or blank votes			
Total votes		43,346	100.00
Turnout			

Washington's 6th legislative district House 2 general election, 2012
Party	Candidate	Votes	%
Republican	Jeff Holy	32,195	55.03
Democratic	Dennis Dellwo	26,313	44.97
Invalid or blank votes			
Total votes		58,508	100.00
Turnout			

=== District 7 ===
Washington's 7th legislative district House 1 general election, 2012
Party	Candidate	Votes	%
Republican	Shelly Short (inc.)	43,631	100.00
Invalid or blank votes			
Total votes		43,631	100.00
Turnout			

Washington's 7th legislative district House 2 general election, 2012
Party	Candidate	Votes	%
Republican	Joel Kretz (inc.)	31,328	63.92
Republican	Robert (Bob) Wilson	17,682	36.08
Invalid or blank votes			
Total votes		49,010	100.00
Turnout			

=== District 8 ===
Washington's 8th legislative district House 1 general election, 2012
Party	Candidate	Votes	%
Republican	Brad Klippert (inc.)	36,889	62.13
Democratic	Jay Clough	22,487	37.87
Invalid or blank votes			
Total votes		59,376	100.00
Turnout			

Washington's 8th legislative district House 2 general election, 2012
Party	Candidate	Votes	%
Democratic	Richard Reuther	16,189	27.5
Republican	Larry Haler (inc.)	42,687	72.5
Invalid or blank votes			
Total votes		58,876	100.00
Turnout			

=== District 9 ===
Washington's 9th legislative district House 1 general election, 2012
Party	Candidate	Votes	%
Republican	Susan Fagan (inc.)		100.00
Invalid or blank votes			
Total votes			100.00
Turnout			

Washington's 9th legislative district House 2 general election, 2012
Party	Candidate	Votes	%
Republican	Joe Schmick (inc.)		100.00
Invalid or blank votes			
Total votes			100.00
Turnout			

=== District 10 ===
Washington's 10th legislative district House 1 general election, 2012
Party	Candidate	Votes	%
Republican	Norma Smith (inc.)	39,601	61.06
Democratic	Aaron Simpson	25,256	38.94
Invalid or blank votes			
Total votes		64,857	100.00
Turnout			

Washington's 10th legislative district House 2 general election, 2012
Party	Candidate	Votes	%
Republican	Dave Hayes	33,572	52.28
Democratic	Tom Riggs	30,643	47.72
Invalid or blank votes			
Total votes		64,215	100.00
Turnout			

=== District 11 ===
Washington's 11th legislative district House 1 general election, 2012
Party	Candidate	Votes	%
Democratic	Zach Hudgins (inc.)	29,602	77.01
Democratic	Jim Flynn	8,837	22.99
Invalid or blank votes			
Total votes		38,439	100.00
Turnout			

Washington's 11th legislative district House 2 general election, 2012
Party	Candidate	Votes	%
Democratic	Steve Bergquist	30,571	71.3
Republican	Sarah Sanoy-Wright	12,306	28.7
Invalid or blank votes			
Total votes		42,877	100.00
Turnout			

=== District 12 ===
Washington's 12th legislative district House 1 general election, 2012
Party	Candidate	Votes	%
Republican	Cary Condotta (inc.)	30,962	64.79
Republican	Stan Morse	16,826	35.21
Invalid or blank votes			
Total votes		47,788	100.00
Turnout			

Washington's 12th legislative district House 2 general election, 2012
Party	Candidate	Votes	%
Republican	Mike Armstrong (inc.)	23,716	48.71
Republican	Brad Hawkins	24,974	51.29
Invalid or blank votes			
Total votes		48,690	100.00
Turnout			

=== District 13 ===
Washington's 13th legislative district House 1 general election, 2012
Party	Candidate	Votes	%
Republican	Judy Warnick (inc.)		100.00
Invalid or blank votes			
Total votes			100.00
Turnout			

Washington's 13th legislative district House 2 general election, 2012
Party	Candidate	Votes	%
Republican	Matt Manweller	30,032	69.24
Democratic	Kaj Selmann	13,343	30.76
Invalid or blank votes			
Total votes		43,375	100.00
Turnout			

=== District 14 ===
Washington's 14th legislative district House 1 general election, 2012
Party	Candidate	Votes	%
Republican	Norm Johnson (inc.)	28,658	64.15
Democratic	Paul Spencer	16,016	35.85
Invalid or blank votes			
Total votes		44,674	100.00
Turnout			

Washington's 14th legislative district House 2 general election, 2012
Party	Candidate	Votes	%
Republican	Charles Ross (inc.)	29,327	65.9
Democratic	Mathew K.M. Tomaskin	15,173	34.1
Invalid or blank votes			
Total votes		44,500	100.00
Turnout			

=== District 15 ===
Washington's 15th legislative district House 1 general election, 2012
Party	Candidate	Votes	%
Republican	Bruce Chandler (inc.)		100.00
Invalid or blank votes			
Total votes			100.00
Turnout			

Washington's 15th legislative district House 2 general election, 2012
Party	Candidate	Votes	%
Republican	David V. Taylor (inc.)	18,467	63.63
Democratic	Pablo Gonzalez	10,556	36.37
Invalid or blank votes			
Total votes		29,023	100.00
Turnout			

=== District 16 ===
Washington's 16th legislative district House 1 general election, 2012
Party	Candidate	Votes	%
Republican	Maureen Walsh (inc.)	19,136	56.85
Republican	Mary Ruth Edwards	14,524	43.15
Invalid or blank votes			
Total votes		33,660	100.00
Turnout			

Washington's 16th legislative district House 2 general election, 2012
Party	Candidate	Votes	%
Republican	Terry Nealey (inc.)		100.00
Invalid or blank votes			
Total votes			100.00
Turnout			

=== District 17 ===
Washington's 17th legislative district House 1 general election, 2012
Party	Candidate	Votes	%
Democratic	Monica Stonier	26,085	50.08
Republican	Julie Olson	26,004	49.92
Invalid or blank votes			
Total votes		52,089	100.00
Turnout			

Washington's 17th legislative district House 2 general election, 2012
Party	Candidate	Votes	%
Republican	Paul Harris (inc.)	28,657	55.91
Democratic	Jim Gizzi	22,595	44.09
Invalid or blank votes			
Total votes		51,252	100.00
Turnout			

=== District 18 ===
Washington's 18th legislative district House 1 general election, 2012
Party	Candidate	Votes	%
Republican	Brandon Vick	34,848	67.86
Republican	Adrian E. Cortes	16,504	32.14
Invalid or blank votes			
Total votes		51,352	100.00
Turnout			

Washington's 18th legislative district House 2 general election, 2012
Party	Candidate	Votes	%
Democratic	David Shehorn	23,724	39.46
Republican	Liz Pike	36,393	60.54
Invalid or blank votes			
Total votes		60,117	100.00
Turnout			

=== District 19 ===
Washington's 19th legislative district House 1 general election, 2012
Party	Candidate	Votes	%
Democratic	Dean Takko (inc.)	32,363	51.79
Republican	Dixie Kolditz	29,854	48.25
Total votes		51,249	100.00
Democratic hold			

Washington's 19th legislative district House 2 general election, 2012
Party	Candidate	Votes	%
Democratic	Brian Blake (inc.)	29,854	58.25
Independent (politician)	Tim Sutinen (Note: Write-in)	21,395	41.75
Invalid or blank votes			
Total votes		51,249	100.00
Turnout			

=== District 20 ===
Washington's 20th legislative district House 1 general election, 2012
Party	Candidate	Votes	%
Republican	Richard DeBolt (inc.)		100.00
Invalid or blank votes			
Total votes			100.00
Turnout			

Washington's 20th legislative district House 2 general election, 2012
Party	Candidate	Votes	%
Republican	John Morgan	29,613	69.21
Republican	Ed Orcutt	13,175	30.79
Invalid or blank votes			
Total votes		42,788	100.00
Turnout			

=== District 21 ===
Washington's 21st legislative district House 1 general election, 2012
Party	Candidate	Votes	%
Democratic	Mary Helen Roberts (inc.)		100.00
Invalid or blank votes			
Total votes			100.00
Turnout			

Washington's 21st legislative district House 2 general election, 2012
Party	Candidate	Votes	%
Democratic	Marko Liias (inc.)	30,704	60.16
Republican	Kevin Morrison	20,334	39.84
Invalid or blank votes			
Total votes		51,038	100.00
Turnout			

=== District 22 ===
Washington's 22nd legislative district House 1 general election, 2010
Party	Candidate	Votes	%
Democratic	Chris Reykdal (inc.)		100.00
Invalid or blank votes			
Total votes			100.00
Turnout			

Washington's 22nd legislative district House 2 general election, 2010
Party	Candidate	Votes	%
Democratic	Sam Hunt (inc.)		100.00
Invalid or blank votes			
Total votes			100.00
Turnout			

=== District 23 ===
Washington's 23rd legislative district House 1 general election, 2010
Party	Candidate	Votes	%
Democratic	Sherry Appleton (inc.)	35,817	60.59
Republican	Tony Stephens	23,294	39.41
Invalid or blank votes			
Total votes		59,111	100.00
Turnout			

Washington's 23rd legislative district House 2 general election, 2010
Party	Candidate	Votes	%
Democratic	Drew Hansen	35,059	59.79
Republican	James M. Olsen	23,574	40.21
Invalid or blank votes			
Total votes		58,633	100.00
Turnout			

=== District 24 ===
Washington's 24th legislative district House 1 general election, 2012
Party	Candidate	Votes	%
Democratic	Kevin Van De Wege (inc.)	40,685	64.2
Republican	Craig Durgan	22,690	35.8
Invalid or blank votes			
Total votes		63,375	100.00
Turnout			

Washington's 24th legislative district House 2 general election, 2012
Party	Candidate	Votes	%
Republican	Steve Gale	26,921	41.57
Democratic	Steve Tharinger (inc.)	37,839	58.43
Invalid or blank votes			
Total votes		64,760	100.00
Turnout			

=== District 25 ===
Washington's 25th legislative district House 1 general election, 2012
Party	Candidate	Votes	%
Democratic	Former Representative Dawn Morrell	28,384	52.6
Republican	Shelly Schlumpf	25,574	47.4
Invalid or blank votes			
Total votes		53,958	100.00
Turnout			

Washington's 25th legislative district House 2 general election, 2012
Party	Candidate	Votes	%
Democratic	Bill Hilton	22,992	43.16
Republican	Hans Zeiger (inc.)	30,277	56.84
Invalid or blank votes			
Total votes		53,269	100.00
Turnout			

=== District 26 ===
Washington's 26th legislative district House 1 general election, 2010
Party	Candidate	Votes	%
Republican	Jan Angel (inc.)	36,278	59.25
Democratic	Karin Ashabraner	24,954	40.75
Invalid or blank votes			
Total votes		61,232	100.00
Turnout			

Washington's 26th legislative district House 2 general election, 2010
Party	Candidate	Votes	%
Democratic	Larry Seaquist (inc.)	32,549	53.44
Republican	Doug Richards	28,353	46.56
Invalid or blank votes			
Total votes		60,902	100.00
Turnout			

=== District 27 ===
Washington's 27th legislative district House 1 general election, 2012
Party	Candidate	Votes	%
Democratic	Laurie Jinkins (inc.)	36,969	71.37
Republican	Steven T. Cook	14,829	28.63
Invalid or blank votes			
Total votes		51,798	100.00
Turnout			

Washington's 27th legislative district House 2 general election, 2012
Party	Candidate	Votes	%
Democratic	Lauren Walker	17,706	36.7
Democratic	Jake Fey	30,541	63.3
Invalid or blank votes			
Total votes		48,247	100.00
Turnout			

=== District 28 ===
Washington's 28th legislative district House 1 general election, 2012
Party	Candidate	Votes	%
Democratic	Eric Choiniere	22,944	44.92
Republican	Steve O'Ban	28,135	55.08
Invalid or blank votes			
Total votes		51,079	100.00
Turnout			

Washington's 28th legislative district House 2 general election, 2012
Party	Candidate	Votes	%
Democratic	Tami Green (inc.)	28,665	55.33
Republican	Paul Wagemann	23,143	44.67
Invalid or blank votes			
Total votes		51,808	100.00
Turnout			

=== District 29 ===
Washington's 29th legislative district House 1 general election, 2012
Party	Candidate	Votes	%
Democratic	David Sawyer	24,103	63.26
Republican	Terry Harder	13,998	36.74
Invalid or blank votes			
Total votes		38,101	100.00
Turnout			

Washington's 29th legislative district House 2 general election, 2012
Party	Candidate	Votes	%
Democratic	Steve Kirby (inc.)		100.00
Invalid or blank votes			
Total votes			100.00
Turnout			

=== District 30 ===
Washington's 30th legislative district House 1 general election, 2012
Party	Candidate	Votes	%
Democratic	Roger Flygare	20,846	48.97
Republican	Linda Kochmar	21,720	51.03
Invalid or blank votes			
Total votes		42,566	100.00
Turnout			

Washington's 30th legislative district House 2 general election, 2012
Party	Candidate	Votes	%
Republican	Katrina Asay (inc.)	19,325	45.4
Democratic	Roger Freeman	23,242	54.6
Invalid or blank votes			
Total votes		42,567	100.00
Turnout			

=== District 31 ===
Washington's 31st legislative district House 1 general election, 2012
Party	Candidate	Votes	%
Republican	Cathy Dahlquist (inc.)	34,694	62.93
Democratic	Brian L. Gunn	20,439	37.07
Invalid or blank votes			
Total votes		55,133	100.00
Turnout			

Washington's 31st legislative district House 2 general election, 2012
Party	Candidate	Votes	%
Democratic	Christopher Hurst (Note: Prefers Independent Democratic Party) (inc.)	30,220	55.26
Republican	Lisa Connors	24,468	44.74
Invalid or blank votes			
Total votes		54,688	100.00
Turnout			

=== District 32 ===
Washington's 32nd legislative district House 1 general election, 2012
Party	Candidate	Votes	%
Democratic	Cindy Ryu (inc.)	40,385	71.96
Republican	Randy J. Hayden	15,734	28.04
Invalid or blank votes			
Total votes		56,119	100.00
Turnout			

Washington's 32nd legislative district House 2 general election, 2012
Party	Candidate	Votes	%
Democratic	Ruth Kagi (inc.)	40,574	72.62
Republican	Robert Reedy	15,298	27.38
Invalid or blank votes			
Total votes		55,872	100.00
Turnout			

=== District 33 ===
Washington's 33rd legislative district House 1 general election, 2012
Party	Candidate	Votes	%
Democratic	Tina Orwall (inc.)	29,158	71.65
Republican	Will Benge	11,527	28.35
Invalid or blank votes			
Total votes		40,695	100.00
Turnout			

Washington's 33rd legislative district House 2 general election, 2012
Party	Candidate	Votes	%
Democratic	Dave Upthegrove (inc.)	28,294	69.7
Republican	Martin Metz	12,299	30.3
Invalid or blank votes			
Total votes		40,593	100.00
Turnout			

=== District 34 ===
Washington's 34th legislative district House 1 general election, 2012
Party	Candidate	Votes	%
Democratic	William Giammarese	7,423	13.95
Democratic	Eileen Cody (inc.)	45,802	86.05
Invalid or blank votes			
Total votes		53,225	100.00
Turnout			

Washington's 34th legislative district House 2 general election, 2012
Party	Candidate	Votes	%
Democratic	Joe Fitzgibbon (inc.)		100.00
Invalid or blank votes			
Total votes			100.00
Turnout			

=== District 35 ===
Washington's 35th legislative district House 1 general election, 2012
Party	Candidate	Votes	%
Democratic	Kathy Haigh (inc.)	30,913	51.24
Republican	Daniel (Dan) Griffey	29,414	48.76
Invalid or blank votes			
Total votes		60,327	100.00
Turnout			

Washington's 35th legislative district House 2 general election, 2012
Party	Candidate	Votes	%
Democratic	Lynda Ring-Erickson	28,354	47.81
Republican	Drew C. MacEwen	30,952	52.19
Invalid or blank votes			
Total votes		59,306	100.00
Turnout			

=== District 36 ===
Washington's 36th legislative district House 1 general election, 2012
Party	Candidate	Votes	%
Democratic	Reuven Carlyle (inc.)	57,918	88.67
Republican	Leslie Klein (Note: Prefers (R) Hope&change Party)	7,403	11.33
Invalid or blank votes			
Total votes		65,321	100.00
Turnout			

Washington's 36th legislative district House 2 general election, 2012
Party	Candidate	Votes	%
Democratic	Gael Tarleton	34,481	56.49
Democratic	Noel Christina Frame	26,563	43.51
Invalid or blank votes			
Total votes		61,044	100.00
Turnout			

=== District 37 ===
Washington's 37th legislative district House 1 general election, 2012
Party	Candidate	Votes	%
Democratic	Sharon Tomiko Santos (inc.)		100.00
Invalid or blank votes			
Total votes			100.00
Turnout			

Washington's 37th legislative district House 2 election, 2012
Party	Candidate	Votes	%
Democratic	Eric Pettigrew (inc.)	27,455	60.26
Independent	Tamra Smilanich (Note: Prefers Non-Partisan Party)	18,103	39.74
Invalid or blank votes			
Total votes		45,558	100.00
Turnout			

=== District 38 ===
Washington's 38th legislative district House 1 general election, 2012
Party	Candidate	Votes	%
Democratic	John McCoy (inc.)	27,455	60.26
Republican	Sam Wilson	18,103	39.74
Invalid or blank votes			
Total votes		45,558	100.00
Turnout			

Washington's 38th legislative district House 2 general election, 2010
Party	Candidate	Votes	%
Democratic	Mike Sells (inc.)	27,765	62.17
Republican	Michael Casey	16,893	37.83
Invalid or blank votes			
Total votes		44,658	100.00
Turnout			

=== District 39 ===
Washington's 39th legislative district House 1 general election, 2012
Party	Candidate	Votes	%
Republican	Dan Kristiansen (inc.)	28,266	55.52
Democratic	Linda Wright	22,649	44.48
Invalid or blank votes			
Total votes		50,915	100.00
Turnout			

Washington's 39th legislative district House 2 general election, 2012
Party	Candidate	Votes	%
Republican	Elizabeth Scott	27,065	53.58
Democratic	Eleanor Walters	23,445	46.42
Invalid or blank votes			
Total votes		50,510	100.00
Turnout			

=== District 40 ===
Washington's 40th legislative district House 1 general election, 2012
Party	Candidate	Votes	%
Democratic	Kristine Lytton (inc.)	37,430	73.67
Independent	Brandon Robinson	13,381	26.33

Washington's 40th legislative district House 2 general election, 2012
Party	Candidate	Votes	%
Democratic	Jeff Morris (inc.)	37,422	75.87
Green	Howard A. Pellett	11,904	24.13

=== District 41 ===
Washington's 41st legislative district House 1 general election, 2012
Party	Candidate	Votes	%
Democratic	Marcie Maxwell (inc.)	40,038	58.53
Republican	Tim Eaves	28,370	41.47
Invalid or blank votes		0	0
Total votes		68,408	100.00

Washington's 41st legislative district House 2 general election, 2012
Party	Candidate	Votes	%
Democratic	Judy Clibborn (inc.)	48,847	100.00
Invalid or blank votes		0	0
Total votes		48,847	100.00
Turnout			

=== District 42 ===
Washington's 42nd legislative district House 1 general election, 2012
Party	Candidate	Votes	%
Republican	Jason Overstreet (inc.)	31,903	54.75
Democratic	Natalie McClendon	26,363	45.25
Invalid or blank votes			
Total votes		58,266	100.00
Turnout			

Washington's 42nd legislative district House 2 general election, 2012
Party	Candidate	Votes	%
Democratic	Matthew Krogh	26,499	45.54
Republican	Vincent Buys (inc.)	31,691	54.46
Invalid or blank votes			
Total votes		58,190	100.00
Turnout			

=== District 43 ===
Washington's 43rd legislative district House 1 general election, 2012
Party	Candidate	Votes	%
Democratic	Jamie Pedersen (inc.)	59,762	100
Invalid or blank votes			
Total votes		59,762	100.00
Turnout			

Washington's 43rd legislative district House 2 general election, 2012
Party	Candidate	Votes	%
Democratic	Representative Frank Chopp (inc.)	49,125	70.63
Socialist Alternative	Kshama Sawant (Note: Prefers Socialist Altern Party)	20,425	29.37
Invalid or blank votes			
Total votes		69,550	100.00
Turnout			

=== District 44 ===
Washington's 44th legislative district House 1 general election, 2012
Party	Candidate	Votes	%
Democratic	Hans Dunshee (inc.)	31,921	54.08
Republican	Mark Harmsworth	27,106	45.92
Invalid or blank votes			
Total votes		59,027	100.00
Turnout			

Washington's 44th legislative district House 2 general election, 2010
Party	Candidate	Votes	%
Republican	Mike Hope (inc.)	32,757	56.08
Democratic	Mary McNaughton	25,658	43.92
Invalid or blank votes			
Total votes		58,415	100.00
Turnout			

=== District 45 ===
Washington's 45th legislative district House 1 general election, 2012
Party	Candidate	Votes	%
Democratic	Roger Goodman (inc.)	33,854	56.24
Republican	Joel Hussey	26,340	43.76
Invalid or blank votes			
Total votes		60,194	100.00
Turnout			

Washington's 45th legislative district House 2 general election, 2012
Party	Candidate	Votes	%
Democratic	Larry Springer (inc.)	34,486	57.64
Republican	Jim Thatcher	25,347	42.36
Invalid or blank votes			
Total votes		59,833	100.00
Turnout			

=== District 46 ===
Washington's 46th legislative district House 1 general election, 2012
Party	Candidate	Votes	%
Democratic	Gerry Pollet (inc.)	42,952	65.4
Democratic	Sylvester Cann	22,721	34.6
Total votes		65,673	100.00

Washington's 46th legislative district House 2 general election, 2012
Party	Candidate	Votes	%
Democratic	Jessyn Farrell	40,228	63.79
Democratic	Sarajane Siegfriedt	22,838	36.21
Total votes		63,066	100.00

=== District 47 ===
Washington's 47th legislative district House 1 general election, 2012
Party	Candidate	Votes	%
Democratic	Bud Sizemore	24,001	49.62
Republican	Mark Hargrove (inc.)	24,364	50.38
Total votes		48,365	100.00
Republican hold			

Washington's 47th legislative district House 2 general election, 2012
Party	Candidate	Votes	%
Democratic	Pat Sullivan (inc.)	28,563	60
Republican	Andy Massagli	19,066	40
Total votes		47,649	100.00
Democratic hold			

=== District 48 ===
Washington's 48th legislative district House 1 general election, 2012
Party	Candidate	Votes	%
Democratic	Ross Hunter (inc.)	39,362	69.27
Republican	Bill Hirt	17,463	30.73
Total votes		56,825	100.00

Washington's 48th legislative district House 2 general election, 2012
Party	Candidate	Votes	%
Democratic	Cyrus Habib	35,078	61.38
Republican	Hank Myers	22,071	38.62
Total votes		57,149	100.00

=== District 49 ===
Washington's 49th legislative district House 1 general election, 2012
Party	Candidate	Votes	%
Democratic	Sharon Wylie	31,658	60.16
Republican	Debbie Peterson	20,963	39.84
Total votes		52,621	100.00

Washington's 49th legislative district House 2 general election, 2012
Party	Candidate	Votes	%
Democratic	Jim Moeller (inc.)	31,858	60.57
Republican	Carolyn Crain	20,737	39.43
Total votes		52,595	100.00
