= Brian Sullivan (Washington politician, born 1958) =

American politician

Treasurer of Snohomish County
- Incumbent
- Assumed office January 1, 2020
- Preceded by: Kirke Sievers

Chair of the Snohomish County Council
- In office January 3, 2017 – February 4, 2018
- Preceded by: Terry Ryan
- Succeeded by: Stephanie Wright
- In office January 1, 2012 – January 1, 2013
- Preceded by: Dave Somers
- Succeeded by: Stephanie Wright

Member of Snohomish County Council from the 2nd district
- In office January 1, 2008 – January 1, 2020
- Preceded by: Kirke Sievers
- Succeeded by: Megan Dunn

Member of the Washington House of Representatives from the 21st district
- In office January 7, 2002 – January 5, 2008
- Preceded by: Joe Marine
- Succeeded by: Marko Liias

Personal details
- Born: Brian James Sullivan; March 26, 1958 (age 68) Butte, Montana, U.S.
- Party: Democratic

Brian James Sullivan (born March 26, 1958) is an American politician, serving as the Snohomish County Treasurer.

== Background ==
Born in Butte, Montana, Sullivan graduated from Mariner High School in Everett, Washington and then studied political science at Central Washington University and University of Washington. He worked for a local planning agency: Snohomish County Tomorrow and owned a small business in Mukilteo, Washington. Sullivan served on the Mukilteo City Council from 1986 to 1989 and then Mayor of Mukilteo from 1990 to 1997. From 2001 to 2007, Sullivan served in the Washington House of Representatives as a Democrat.

In 2007, Sullivan was elected to the Snohomish County Council.

He ran for mayor of Everett in 2017, but finished third in the primary behind Cassie Franklin and Judy Tuohy.

In 2019 he ran for and was elected Snohomish County Treasurer. His seat on the county council was won by Megan Dunn.

Preceded by Emory Cole (NP)	Mayor of Mukilteo; 1990–1997	Succeeded by Donald Doran (NP)
Preceded by Joe Marine (R)	Washington State Representative; 21st district 2001–2007	Succeeded by Marko Liias (D)
Preceded by Kirk Sievers (D)	Snohomish County Councilmember; District 2; 2008–2020	Succeeded by Megan Dunn (D)
