= Mary Helen Roberts =

American politician

Member of the Washington House of Representatives from the 21st district
- In office January 10, 2005 – January 12, 2015
- Preceded by: Mike Cooper
- Succeeded by: Strom Peterson

Personal details
- Born: September 14, 1947 (age 79) Portland, Oregon
- Party: Democratic
- Education: Oregon State University, UCLA

Mary Helen Roberts (born September 14, 1947) is an American politician who is a member of the Democratic Party. She is a former member of the Washington House of Representatives, representing the 21st district from 2005 to 2015. She did not seek re-election in 2014 and was succeeded by Strom Peterson.

Born in Portland, Oregon, Roberts spent her childhood in Portland, Corvallis, Oregon and Southern California. After graduating from high school, she spend one year at Oregon State University studying mathematics and then transferred to UCLA, from where she graduated with a bachelor's degree in political science.

She is openly gay.
