= Marko Liias =

American politician from Washington (born 1981)

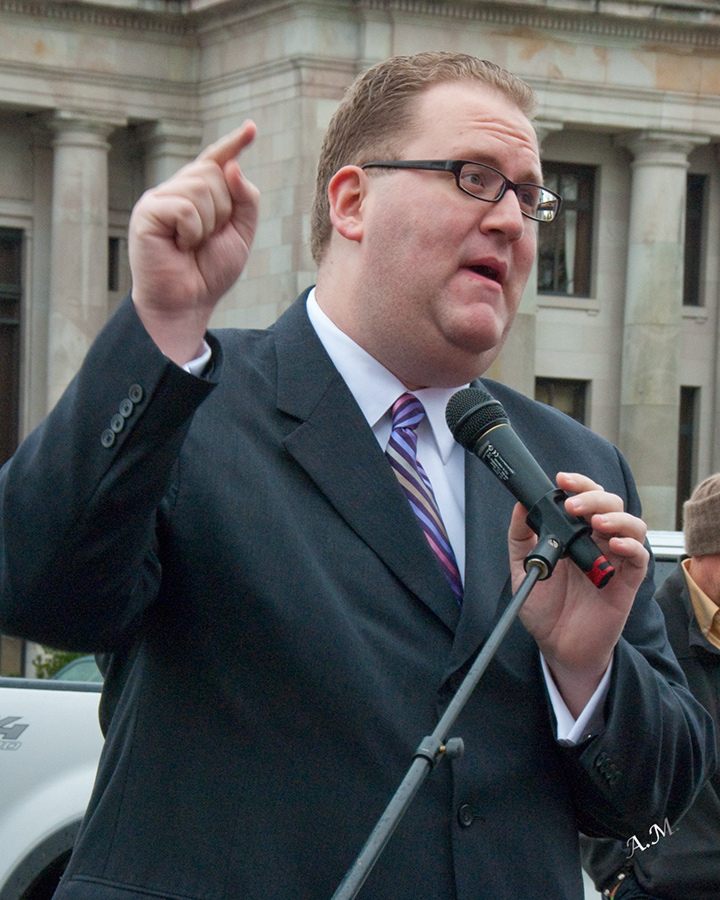

Member of the Washington State Senate from the 21st district
- Incumbent
- Assumed office January 22, 2014
- Preceded by: Paull Shin

Member of the Washington House of Representatives from the 21st district
- In office January 7, 2008 – January 22, 2014
- Preceded by: Brian Sullivan
- Succeeded by: Lillian Ortiz-Self

Personal details
- Born: Marko Sakari Liias; July 17, 1981 (age 45) Edmonds, Washington, U.S.
- Party: Democratic
- Education: Georgetown University (BA); University of Washington (MA)
- Website: State Senate website

Marko Sakari Liias (born July 17, 1981) is an American politician serving as a member of the Washington State Senate, representing the 21st district since 2014. The district, located within Snohomish County, includes portions of Lynnwood and Everett, as well as his hometown of Mukilteo and his native Edmonds. A member of the Democratic Party, he served as a member of the Washington House of Representatives from 2008 to 2014.

== Early life and education ==
Liias grew up in south Everett, Washington and attended public school in Mukilteo. He is a graduate of Kamiak High School in Mukilteo, Washington. He earned a Bachelor of Arts degree from Georgetown University in Washington, D.C., where he studied government and international relations. During his time at Georgetown, he was an intern in the office of Congressman Jay Inslee. He later pursued graduate coursework at the University of Washington’s Evans School of Public Policy and Governance, receiving a Master’s in public administration.

== Career ==
=== Mukilteo City Council ===
At the age of 24, Liias was elected to Mukilteo City Council in November 2005, running unopposed. He had served on the Snohomish County Alcohol and Drug Advisory Board from 2003 to 2004, and as a member of the Snohomish County Board of Equalization from 2004 to 2006. As a city councilman, he also served as an alternate board member for Community Transit, and as a representative to the Puget Sound Regional Council.

=== State House ===
When Rep. Brian Sullivan was elected to Snohomish County Council in November 2007, he resigned his seat in the Washington State Legislature. The Democratic precinct committee officers (PCOs) from the 21st district had the opportunity of selecting his successor, subject to the county council's ratification. With 21 votes, Liias was their first choice, defeating Lynnwood city councilman Mark Smith (16 votes) and Snohomish County Labor Council president Darrell Chapman (15 votes). The council voted unanimously to confirm the choice of the PCOs and appointed Liias to the seat.

After being elected to his first full term in 2008, Liias was selected as the vice chair of the House Transportation Committee, one of three budget-writing committees in the House of Representatives. He was also selected to serve on the influential Rules Committee, which plays a critical gatekeeping role in the legislative process. Liias served on three other committees: Education, Agriculture & Natural Resources, and Community & Economic Development & Trade. In January 2011, Liias was reappointed as vice chair of the House Transportation Committee, and he was appointed to the Education Committee and the Technology, Energy and Communications Committee.

=== State Senate ===
In January 2014, the district state senator, Paull Shin of the 21st Legislative District resigned following a diagnosis of Alzheimer's disease. The Democratic precinct committee officers (PCOs) of the district selected then-State Representative Marko Liias as their sole nominee to fill the vacancy. The Snohomish County Council unanimously confirmed the appointment, and Liias was sworn into the Washington State Senate on January 22, 2014.

Since then, Liias has been elected to full terms in the Senate and is currently serving his third term following reelection in 2022. He serves as the chair of the Senate Transportation Committee and sits on the Agriculture, Water, Natural Resources & Parks Committee, Environment, Energy & Technology Committee, the Oral History Advisory Committee, and the Oregon-Washington Legislative Action Committee.

=== Congressional candidate ===
On August 2, 2011, Liias announced he would be a candidate in 2012 for the 1st district seat in the U.S. House held by Congressman Jay Inslee, who retired to mount a successful bid for governor.

As a result of Washington's decennial redistricting process (and the addition of a tenth congressional district), Liias's home was moved out of the 1st congressional district. Liias responded by dropping his congressional campaign on December 29, 2011, and announcing he would seek re-election to the legislature in 2012.

=== State treasurer race ===
On May 19, 2016, Liias announced he was running for state treasurer. In the primary election held on August 2, 2016, the two Republican candidates placed first and second, with the three Democratic candidates placing third, fourth and fifth. Liias placed third, earning 20% of the vote.

=== Lieutenant governor race ===
Liias ran for Lieutenant Governor of Washington in 2020. He came in second in the primary but was defeated by Denny Heck in the general election.

== Elections ==
Liias was first elected to Position 2 in the Washington House of Representatives from the 21st Legislative District in November 2008. He faced no Democratic opposition in the primary and defeated Republican Andrew Funk, then an 18-year-old challenger, with nearly 64% of the vote.

In 2010, Liias was reelected to the House after defeating Republican Elizabeth Scott with 54% of the vote. In 2012, he secured another term by winning 60% of the vote against Republican Kevin Morrison, a write-in candidate who advanced to the general election. Liias served in the House until his appointment to the state Senate in January 2014.

After completing the remainder of Senator Shin’s term, Liias successfully ran for election to the Senate in 2014. He defeated Dan Matthews receiving 54.34% of the vote. In his first reelection in 2018, he defeated Republican Mario Lionel Lotmore, receiving 63.16% of the vote. In 2022, he won reelection with 63.25% of the vote, defeating Republican Janelle Cass.

== Political positions ==
=== LGBTQ+ rights ===
Liias supports transgender rights and supports gender-affirming care for youth that identify as transgender. He was the prime sponsor of Senate Bill 5599, which allowed "organizations providing services to unsheltered youth to delay notifying a parent or guardian" if the youth is pursuing gender-affirming health care.

=== Animal welfare ===
In April 2025, Liias sponsored legislation banning the use of elephants, bears, wild cats, and nonhuman primates in circuses in Washington state.

== Personal life ==
Liias is openly gay. He is of Finnish American descent and speaks Finnish.
