= Tami Green =

American politician from Washington

Member of the Washington House of Representatives from the 28th district
- In office January 10, 2005 – January 12, 2015
- Preceded by: Bob Lawrence
- Succeeded by: Christine Kilduff

Personal details
- Party: Democratic
- Spouse: Don
- Children: 2

Tami J. Green is an American politician of the Democratic Party. She is a former member of the Washington House of Representatives, representing the 28th district.
