= Christine Kilduff =

American politician from Washington

Member of the Washington House of Representatives from the 28th district
- In office January 12, 2015 – January 11, 2021
- Preceded by: Tami Green
- Succeeded by: Dan Bronoske

Personal details
- Born: 1966 (age 59–60) New York City, New York, U.S.
- Party: Democratic
- Education: Boston College (BA, JD)
- Profession: Lawyer
- Website: Legislative website

Christine J. Kilduff (born 1966) is an American lawyer and politician. A Democrat, she served in the Washington House of Representatives January 12, 2015 to January 11, 2021. She was elected in 2014, narrowly defeating Paul Wagemann of the Republican Party in the general election. She has also served as president of the school board in the University Place School District and worked as a Washington state assistant attorney general.

== Personal life ==
Kilduff is married with children. She and her wife reside in University Place. Kilduff is fluent in several languages, including Spanish.
