= Gina Mosbrucker =

American businesswoman and politician from Washington

Gina R. Mosbrucker

Member of the Washington House of Representatives from the 14th district
- In office January 1, 2015 – January 13, 2025
- Preceded by: Charles Ross
- Succeeded by: Deb Manjarrez

Personal details
- Born: Gina Rae Mosbrucker; 1963 (age 62–63) Lakewood, Washington, U.S.
- Party: Republican
- Education: University of Washington (BS); Concord Law School (attended)
- Profession: Politician, businesswoman
- Website: Legislative website

Gina Rae Mosbrucker (born 1963) is an American politician who served as a member of the Washington House of Representatives since January 1, 2015, when she was sworn in 11 days ahead of most new Washington state legislators, until January 13, 2025. She was elected in 2014 to succeed retiring Republican Charles Ross.

== Early life ==
Born Gina Mosbrucker, she is a fourth-generation resident of Klickitat County, Washington.

== Career ==
Mosbrucker runs the Goldendale Quality Inn and Suites Hotel and a performing arts studio in her hometown of Goldendale. She is a former vice president and director of the Goldendale Chamber of Commerce. For sixteen years, she went by her husband's surname "McCabe", but after divorcing her husband in April 2018, reverted her surname to "Mosbrucker".

== Awards ==
- 2021 City Champion Awards. Presented by Association of Washington Cities (AWC).
