= Lillian Ortiz-Self =

American politician (born 1960)

Member of the Washington House of Representatives from the 21st district
- Incumbent
- Assumed office January 21, 2014 Serving with Strom Peterson
- Preceded by: Marko Liias

Personal details
- Born: Lillian Ortiz; 1960 (age 65–66) New York, U.S.
- Party: Democratic
- Spouse: Clayton Self
- Education: Drake University (MA)

Lillian Ortiz-Self (born 1960) is an American politician serving as a member of the Washington House of Representatives from the 21st District. Ortiz-Self was appointed to the state legislature on January 21, 2014 by the Snohomish County Council.

She's a member of the Washington state Commission on Hispanic Affairs. She also serves on the Educational Opportunity Gap Oversight and Accountability Committee.

== Career ==
Following her 2014 electoral win, Ortiz-Self was assigned to the Early Learning and Human Services Committee, the Environment Committee, and the Transportation Committee. Ortiz-Self has been re-elected four times: in 2016, with 62% of the vote, in 2018, with 65% of the vote, in 2020, with 66% of the vote, and in 2022, with 67% of the vote. Ortiz-Self was elected in 2020 as the House Democratic Caucus Chair.
