= Luanne Van Werven =

American politician (born 1957)

Member of the Washington House of Representatives from the 42nd district
- In office January 12, 2015 – January 11, 2021
- Preceded by: Jason Overstreet
- Succeeded by: Alicia Rule

Chair of the Washington Republican Party Acting
- In office July 31, 2013 – August 24, 2013
- Preceded by: Kirby Wilbur
- Succeeded by: Susan Hutchison

Personal details
- Born: Luanne Miller; 1957 (age 68–69) Bellingham, Washington, U.S.
- Party: Republican
- Spouse: Larry Van Werven
- Children: 4
- Education: Bellevue College (attended)
- Website: Legislative website

Luanne Miller Van Werven (born 1957) is an American politician. Van Werven is a former Republican member of Washington House of Representatives for District 42. Van Werven served from January 12, 2015 to January 11, 2021. She was elected vice chair of the Washington State Republican Party in January 2013 and served as interim chair from July to August later that year, when she lost the position to Susan Hutchison. She previously served as chair of the party in Whatcom County.

In the 2017–2018 Legislative Year, Van Werven sponsored HB 1775, which would prohibit abortion after 20 weeks of gestation. This act would be known and cited as the "Washington pain capable unborn child protection act". The bill was never voted on.
