= Strom Peterson =

American politician

Member of the Washington House of Representatives from the 21st district
- Incumbent
- Assumed office January 12, 2015 Serving with Lillian Ortiz-Self
- Preceded by: Mary Helen Roberts

Member of the Snohomish County Council from the 3rd district
- Incumbent
- Assumed office September 29, 2022
- Preceded by: Stephanie Wright

Personal details
- Born: Strom Howard Peterson; 1967 or 1968 (age 57–58) Albuquerque, New Mexico, U.S.
- Party: Democratic
- Spouse: Maria Montalvo
- Education: University of New Mexico (BA)
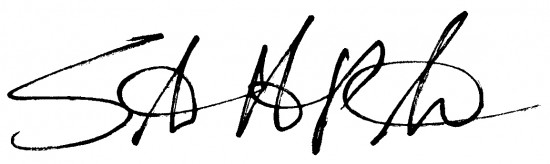
- Signature

Strom Howard Peterson (born 1967 or 1968) is a member of the Washington State House of Representatives representing the 21st Legislative District. In September 2022, Peterson was appointed to serve on the Snohomish County Council.

== Political career ==
Peterson was appointed to the Edmonds City Council in 2009. He retained his seat in 2009 and was reelected to the Council in 2013. He served for two years as the Council's President.

Peterson finished second in the August primary, defeating three other Democratic candidates. In the November election, Peterson defeated McPheeters with over 60% of the vote

Peterson sponsored legislation banning assault weapons, which passed the house in March 2023. In 2024, Peterson authored legislation preemptively banning octopus farming in Washington over animal rights and welfare concerns. It was enacted in March 2024.
