= Kevin Parker (Washington politician) =

American politician from Washington

Member of the Washington House of Representatives from the 6th district
- In office January 12, 2009 – January 9, 2017
- Preceded by: Don Barlow
- Succeeded by: Mike Volz

Personal details
- Born: Kevin Charles Parker; December 26, 1973 (age 52) Oregon
- Party: Republican
- Spouse: Kerry Michelle (Hultz) Parker
- Children: Emelia; Eve; Ross
- Education: Whitworth University (B.A.); George Fox University (M.B.A.); Gonzaga University (Ph.D.)
- Profession: Entrepreneur, Consultant, and Professor
- Website: Official

Kevin Charles Parker (born December 26, 1973) is an American politician of the Republican Party. He is a former member of the Washington House of Representatives, having represented the 6th Legislative District from 2009 to 2017. Parker currently owns nine Dutch Bros Coffee franchises in the Spokane, Washington area and teaches at Whitworth University's undergraduate and graduate business schools.

== Awards ==
- 2014 Guardians of Small Business award. Presented by NFIB.
