= Dave Hayes (politician) =

American politician

Member of the Washington House of Representatives from the 10th district
- In office January 14, 2013 – January 14, 2019
- Preceded by: Barbara Bailey
- Succeeded by: Dave Paul

Personal details
- Born: David Joe Hayes; August 30, 1966 (age 60) Washington
- Party: Republican
- Spouse: Elizabeth Marie "Lisa" (Robinson) (Baker) Hayes
- Children: One son, one stepson
- Education: Everett Community College (attended)
- Profession: Patrol Sergeant
- Website: Official

Military service
- Allegiance: United States
- Branch/service: United States Navy
- Years of service: 1984 – 1987 (3 years)

David Joe Hayes (born August 30, 1966) is an American politician of the Republican Party. He was a member of the Washington House of Representatives, representing the 10th Legislative District from 2013 to 2019.

== Career ==
Hayes enlisted in the U.S. Navy and served as an aircraft mechanic. Hayes, a deputy with the Snohomish County Sheriff, served as president of the Washington Council of Police and Sheriffs from 2010-2013.
