= Cary Condotta =

American politician

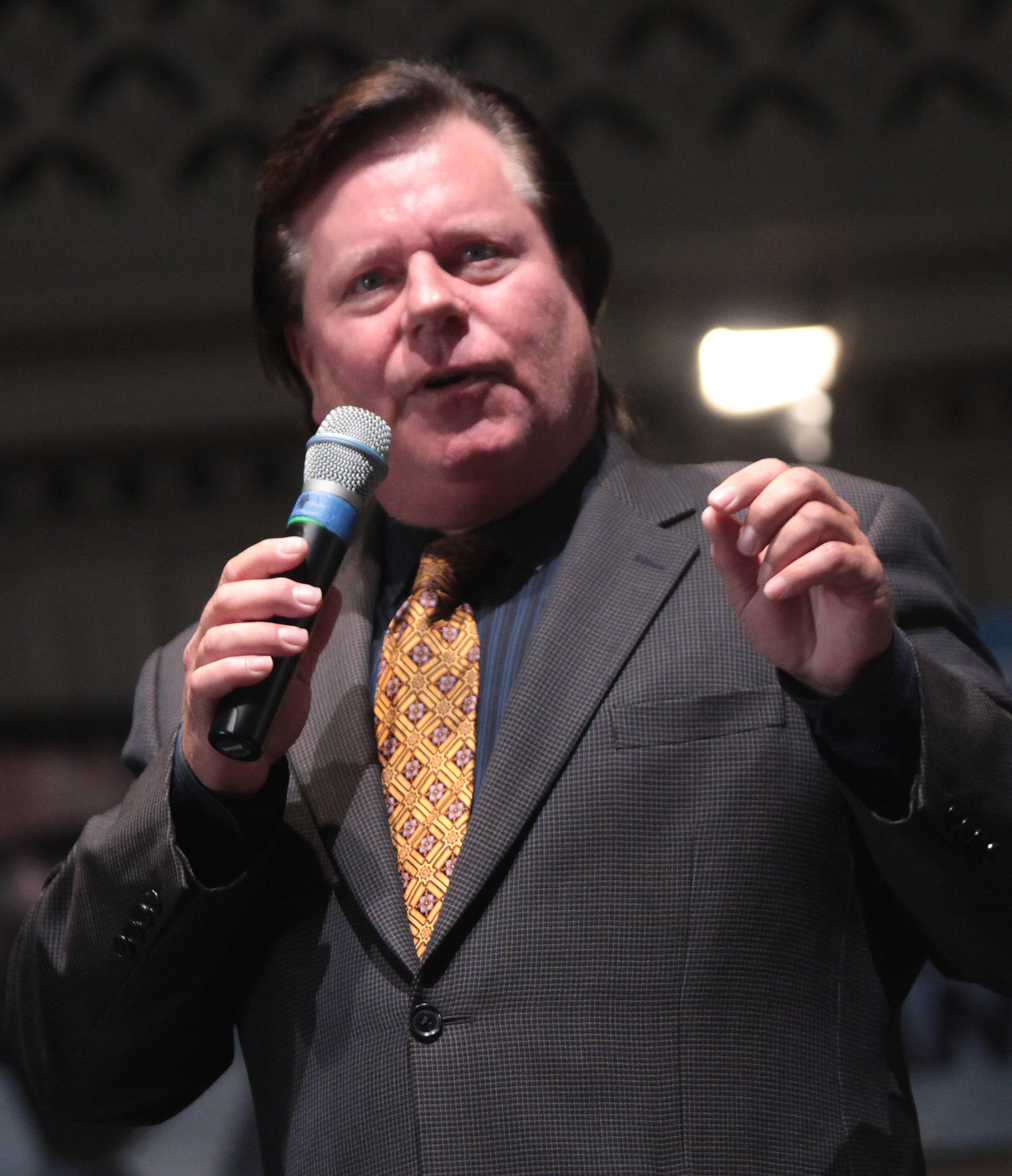
- Condotta in 2015

Member of the Washington House of Representatives from the 12th district
- In office January 13, 2003 – January 14, 2019
- Preceded by: Clyde Ballard
- Succeeded by: Keith Goehner

Personal details
- Born: Cary Lawrence Condotta; June 14, 1957 (age 69) Seattle, Washington, U.S.
- Party: Republican
- Spouse: Rebecca Condotta
- Education: Central Washington University (BA); Central Washington University (BS)
- Profession: Powersports dealer, Radio talk show host
- Website: Official

Cary Lawrence Condotta (born June 14, 1957) is an American politician from Washington. Condotta is a Republican member of the Washington House of Representatives, representing the 12th Legislative District Position 1 from 2003 to 2019. On May 1, 2018, Condotta announced he would be stepping down at the end of his 2017–2018 term, and not running for reelection in 2018.

== Awards ==
- 2014 Guardians of Small Business award. Presented by NFIB.

== Personal life ==
Condotta's wife is Rebecca Condotta. They have one child. Condotta and his family live in Chelan, Washington, and later in East Wenatchee, Washington.
