= Sherry Appleton =

American politician from Washington

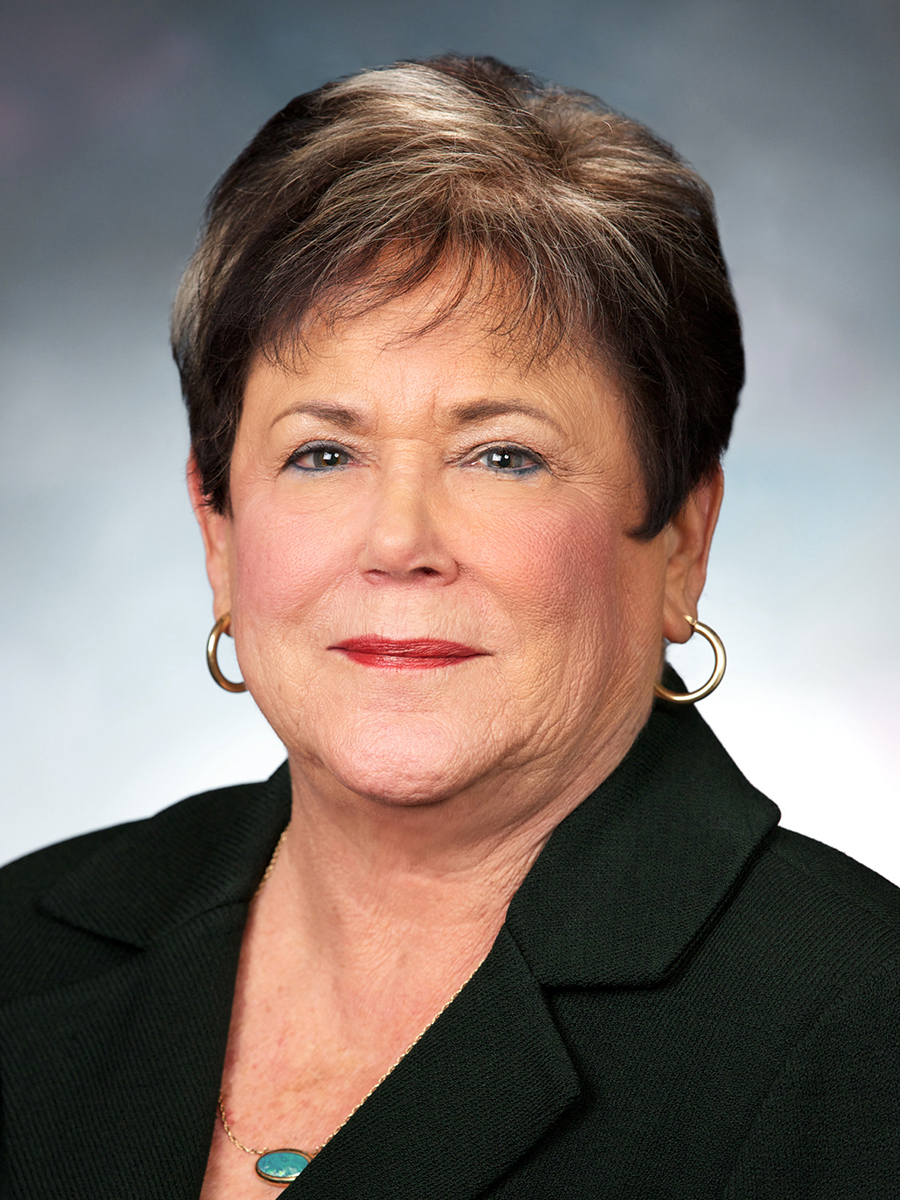
- Sherry Appleton, 2005 Portrait

Member of the Washington House of Representatives from the 23rd district
- In office January 10, 2005 – January 11, 2021
- Preceded by: Phil Rockefeller
- Succeeded by: Tarra Simmons

Personal details
- Born: Sherry Phyllis Tarpey; October 28, 1942 Providence, Rhode Island, U.S.
- Died: October 19, 2023 (aged 80)
- Party: Democratic
- Spouse: Ron Appleton
- Education: University of Miami

Sherry Phyllis Appleton (née Tarpey, October 28, 1942 – October 19, 2023) was an American politician who was a member of the Democratic Party. She was a member of the Washington House of Representatives, representing the 23rd district from 2005 to 2021.

== Career ==
She was on the Poulsbo City Council for two terms.

She was first elected to the Washington House of Representatives for the 23rd district in 2004. The committees she was on are the House Local Government, Public Safety, State Government & Tribal Relations, Community Development, Joint Committee on Veterans' and Military Affairs. She was the chair of the Community Development and Housing & Tribal Affairs House committees. She chaired the Council of State Governments' Public Safety Committee, and was a member of the Washington Council on Aging and Washington state's Commission on Judicial Conduct.

== Personal life ==
She married Ron Appleton (1930–2006) in 1981. They had five children and she has lived in Poulsbo for at least 30 years.
