= David Taylor (Washington politician) =

American politician from Washington

Member of the Washington House of Representatives from the 15th district
- In office March 30, 2009 – January 14, 2019
- Preceded by: Dan Newhouse
- Succeeded by: Jeremie Dufault

Personal details
- Born: David Vincent Taylor; February 17, 1972 (age 54) Ellensburg, Washington, U.S.
- Party: Republican
- Spouse: Molly
- Education: Central Washington University (BA)

David Vincent Taylor (born February 17, 1972) is an American politician of the Republican Party. He was a member of the Washington House of Representatives, representing the 15th district.

== Awards ==
- 2014 Guardians of Small Business award. Presented by NFIB.
