= Mike Sells =

American politician (born 1945)

Member of the Washington House of Representatives from the 38th district
- In office November 30, 2004 – January 9, 2023
- Preceded by: Dave Simpson
- Succeeded by: Mary Fosse

Personal details
- Born: July 28, 1945 (age 81) Seattle, Washington, U.S.
- Party: Democratic
- Education: Central Washington University (BA)

Michael S. Sells (born July 28, 1945) is an American politician of the Democratic Party. He is a member of the Washington House of Representatives from 2004 to 2023, representing the 38th district. He was born in Seattle.
