= Steve Kirby (Washington politician) =

Retired American politician from Washington

Member of the Washington House of Representatives from the 29th district
- In office January 8, 2001 – December 31, 2022
- Preceded by: Brian Sullivan
- Succeeded by: Sharlett Mena

Personal details
- Born: Steven Todd Kirby; November 17, 1951 (age 74) Tacoma, Washington, U.S.
- Party: Democratic
- Spouse: Beckie Summers
- Children: 5
- Education: Tacoma Community College

Steven Todd Kirby (born November 17, 1951) is a retired American politician of the Democratic Party. He is a former member of the Washington House of Representatives, representing the 29th district.

== Biography ==
=== Family ===
Steve Kirby was born and raised in the 29th District, living in the same house in South Tacoma for over forty years before he and his wife, Beckie Summers, moved to Tacoma's Fern Hill neighborhood in 2002. They have five adult children and fifteen grandchildren.

=== Experience ===
Steve Kirby was elected to the Tacoma City Council in 1977 at the age of 25 and served four terms. As a city councilman, he served on the Workforce Development Council Executive Board, the Tacoma-Pierce County Board of Health, the Tacoma Joint Municipal Action Committee, the Pierce Transit Board of Directors, and he was the first chairman of the Tacoma City Council's Public Safety Committee. Kirby was also declared an honorary member of the Tacoma Firefighters Local 31, Tacoma Police Local 6 and Tacoma Library Employees Local 120.

Steve Kirby was elected to the Washington State House of Representatives in 2000 and over his 22-year legislative career, he served on the House Rules Committee, the Agriculture Committee, the Technology Committee, the Capital Budget Committee, The Local Government and Housing Committee, the Public Safety and Emergency Preparedness Committee, the Organized Crime Advisory Board, and the Joint Executive Legislative Committee on Water Policy, the House Civil Rights and Judiciary Committee, the House Commerce and Gaming Committee, the Committee on Committees, and he was the Chairman of the House Consumer Protection and Business Committee for the last 18 years of his career. He retired on December 31, 2022.

In addition to his official civic duties, Steve Kirby was active in his community in other ways for five decades. He is a former member of the Tacoma Athletic Commission, the Tacoma Executives Association, the Pierce County Democratic Central Committee Executive Board, the Pierce County Young Democrats, the Southeast Lions Club, the Southeast Tacoma Optimist Club, the South End Neighborhood Center Advisory Board and the City of Tacoma Community Development Advisory Committee.
