= Joel Kretz =

American politician

Member of the Washington House of Representatives from the 7th district
- In office January 10, 2005 – January 13, 2025
- Preceded by: Cathy McMorris Rodgers
- Succeeded by: Hunter Abell

Personal details
- Born: Joel Andrew Kretz; January 7, 1957 (age 69) Seattle, Washington, U.S.
- Party: Republican
- Spouse(s): Sara Kretz (divorced); Lucka Kretz
- Children: 1
- Education: Green River College (attended), Olympic College (attended)
- Occupation: Rancher, Politician
- Website: Official

Joel Andrew Kretz (born January 7, 1957) is an American politician of the Republican Party. He is a former member of the Washington House of Representatives, representing the 7th Legislative District.

== Early life ==
Kretz was born in Seattle, Washington to Marjory and Vincent Kretz. He graduated from Mercer Island High School.

== Career ==
Kretz is a cowboy.

Kretz was elected to the Washington House of Representatives in 2004. He served as the Republican deputy leader from late 2008 until April 2023.

== Personal life ==
Kretz is married to Lucka Kretz, who is from Bohemia. He has one son, Jed, as well as two grandchildren. Kretz lives in Wauconda, Washington, where he owns and operates the Promised Land Ranch.

== Awards ==
- 2014 Guardians of Small Business award. Presented by NFIB.
- 2020 Guardians of Small Business. Presented by NFIB.
