= Washington's 21st legislative district =

American legislative district

Coordinates: 47°52′N 122°16′W

Washington's 21st legislative district

Washington's 21st legislative district is one of forty-nine districts in Washington state for representation in the state legislature.

The district is in southwest Snohomish County, including all or part of Edmonds, Lynnwood, and Mukilteo.

This mostly suburban district is represented by state senator Marko Liias and state representatives Strom Peterson (position 1) and Lillian Ortiz-Self (position 2), all Democrats.

The state senate position was vacated on January 7, 2014, by Paull Shin (D).

== See also ==
- Washington Redistricting Commission
- Washington State Legislature
- Washington State Senate
- Washington House of Representatives
- Washington (state) legislative districts
