= 2014 United States House of Representatives elections in Washington =

- November 4, 2014

All 10 Washington seats to the United States House of Representatives
| | Majority party | Minority party |
|---|---|---|
| Party | Democratic | Republican |
| Last election | 6 | 4 |
| Seats won | 6 | 4 |
| Seat change | Steady | Steady |
| Popular vote | 1,047,747 | 981,853 |
| Percentage | 51.62% | 48.38% |
| Swing | ▼2.82% | ▲2.82% |

Democratic
50–60%
60–70%
70–80%
80–90%
Republican
50–60%
60–70%
70–80%
80–90%
90–100%

The 2014 United States House of Representatives elections in Washington were held on Tuesday, November 4, 2014, to elect the ten U.S. representatives from the state of Washington, one from each of the state's 10 congressional districts. The elections coincided with other elections to the House of Representatives, other elections to the United States Senate and various state and local elections. The state certified the results on December 4. The nonpartisan blanket primary election was held on August 5, with the top two candidates for each position advancing to the general election.

== Overview ==
Summary of votes cast in the general election

United States House of Representatives elections in Washington, 2014
| Party | Votes | Percentage | Seats Before | Seats After | +/– |
|---|---|---|---|---|---|
| Democratic | 1,047,747 | 51.62% | 6 | 6 | - |
| Republican | 981,853 | 48.38% | 4 | 4 | - |
| Totals | 2,029,600 | 100% | 10 | 10 | - |

=== By district ===
Results of the 2014 United States House of Representatives elections in Washington by district:

| District | Democratic | | Republican | | Others | | Total | | Result |
| District | Votes | % | Votes | % | Votes | % | Votes | % | Result |
|---|---|---|---|---|---|---|---|---|---|
| District 1 | 124,151 | 55.04% | 101,428 | 44.96% | 0 | 0.00% | 225,579 | 100.0% | Democratic hold |
| District 2 | 122,173 | 60.57% | 79,518 | 39.43% | 0 | 0.00% | 201,691 | 100.0% | Democratic hold |
| District 3 | 78,018 | 38.47% | 124,796 | 61.53% | 0 | 0.00% | 202,814 | 100.0% | Republican hold |
| District 4 | 0 | 0.00% | 153,079 | 100.00% | 0 | 0.00% | 153,079 | 100.0% | Republican hold |
| District 5 | 87,772 | 39.32% | 135,470 | 60.68% | 0 | 0.00% | 223,242 | 100.0% | Republican hold |
| District 6 | 141,265 | 63.89% | 83,025 | 36.11% | 0 | 0.00% | 224,290 | 100.0% | Democratic hold |
| District 7 | 203,954 | 83.56% | 47,921 | 16.44% | 0 | 0.00% | 251,875 | 100.0% | Democratic hold |
| District 8 | 73,003 | 36.73% | 125,741 | 63.27% | 0 | 0.00% | 198,744 | 100.0% | Republican hold |
| District 9 | 118,132 | 70.83% | 48,662 | 29.17% | 0 | 0.00% | 166,794 | 100.0% | Democratic hold |
| District 10 | 99,279 | 54.70% | 82,213 | 45.30% | 0 | 0.00% | 181,492 | 100.0% | Democratic hold |
| Total | 1,047,747 | 51.62% | 981,853 | 48.38% | 0 | 0.00% | 2,029,600 | 100.0% | |

== District 1 ==
2014 Washington's 1st congressional district election
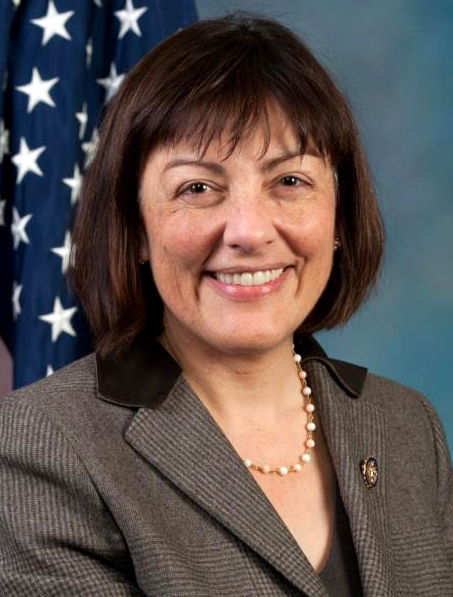

| Nominee | Suzan DelBene | Pedro Celis |
| Party | Democratic | Republican |
| Popular vote | 124,151 | 101,428 |
| Percentage | 55.0% | 45.0% |
- DelBene: 50–60% 60–70% Celis: 50–60%
U.S. Representative before election
Suzan DelBene
Democratic
Elected U.S. Representative
Suzan DelBene
Democratic

Democrat Suzan DelBene, who had represented the 1st district since her 2012 special election to replace Jay Inslee, who resigned to serve as Governor, ran for re-election.

=== Primary election ===
==== Democratic Candidates ====
===== Advanced to general =====
- Suzan DelBene, incumbent U.S. Representative

==== Republican Candidates ====
===== Advanced to general =====
- Pedro Celis, former Microsoft software engineer and former chair of the Republican National Hispanic Assembly

===== Eliminated in primary =====
- Ed Moats, former analyst for the Snohomish County Council
- Robert Sutherland, biochemist
- John Orlinski, social worker and candidate for the 9th District in 2012

==== Results ====
Results by county DelBene: 30–40% 40–50% 50–60%

Nonpartisan blanket primary results
| Party | Candidate | Votes | % |
|---|---|---|---|
| Democratic | Suzan DelBene (incumbent) | 59,798 | 50.7 |
| Republican | Pedro Celis | 19,407 | 16.4 |
| Republican | Robert J. Sutherland | 18,424 | 15.6 |
| Republican | John Orlinski | 11,891 | 10.1 |
| Republican | Edwin F. Moats | 5,252 | 4.5 |
| No party preference | Richard J. Todd | 2,044 | 1.7 |
| Independent | Mike The Mover | 1,192 | 1.0 |
| Total votes | | 118,008 | 100.0 |

=== General election ===
==== Polling ====
| Poll source | Date(s) administered | Sample size | Margin of error | Suzan DelBene (D) | Pedro Celis (R) | Undecided |
|---|---|---|---|---|---|---|
| Moore Information (R-Celis) | October 2014 | 301 | ± 6% | 43% | 34% | 23% |

==== Predictions ====
| Source | Ranking | As of |
|---|---|---|
| The Cook Political Report | Likely D | November 3, 2014 |
| Rothenberg | Safe D | October 24, 2014 |
| Sabato's Crystal Ball | Safe D | October 30, 2014 |
| RCP | Likely D | November 2, 2014 |
| Daily Kos Elections | Safe D | November 4, 2014 |

==== Results ====
2014 Washington's 1st congressional district election
| Party | Candidate | Votes | % |
|---|---|---|---|
| Democratic | Suzan DelBene (incumbent) | 124,151 | 55.0 |
| Republican | Pedro Celis | 101,428 | 45.0 |
| Total votes | | 225,579 | 100.0 |
| Democratic hold | | | |

==== By county ====
County results
| County | Suzan DelBene Democratic | | Pedro Celis Republican | | Margin | | Total votes |
| County | # | % | # | % | # | % | Total votes |
|---|---|---|---|---|---|---|---|
| King (part) | 55,487 | 61.40% | 34,884 | 38.60% | 20,603 | 22.80% | 90,371 |
| Skagit (part) | 8,292 | 58.13% | 5,973 | 41.87% | 2,319 | 16.26% | 14,265 |
| Snohomish (part) | 42,972 | 53.10% | 37,952 | 46.90% | 5,020 | 6.20% | 80,924 |
| Whatcom (part) | 17,400 | 43.48% | 22,619 | 56.52% | -5,219 | -13.04% | 40,019 |
| Totals | 124,151 | 55.04% | 101,428 | 44.96% | 22,723 | 10.07% | 225,579 |

== District 2 ==
2014 Washington's 2nd congressional district election
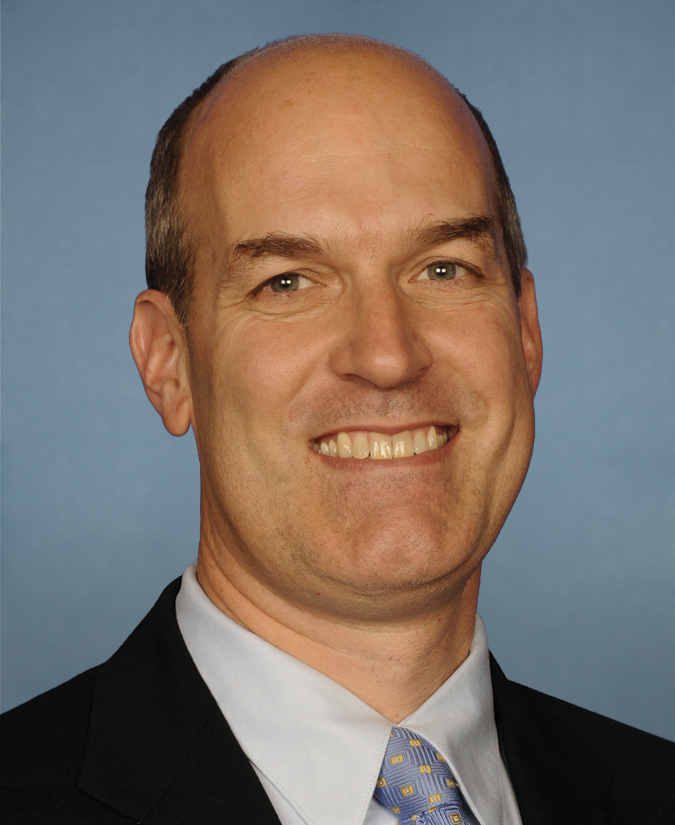

| Nominee | Rick Larsen | B.J. Guillot |
| Party | Democratic | Republican |
| Popular vote | 122,173 | 79,518 |
| Percentage | 60.6% | 39.4% |
- Larsen: 50–60% 60–70% 70–80%
U.S. Representative before election
Rick Larsen
Democratic
Elected U.S. Representative
Rick Larsen
Democratic

Democrat Rick Larsen, who had represented the 2nd district since 2001, ran for re-election.

=== Primary election ===
==== Democratic Candidates ====
===== Advanced to general =====
- Rick Larsen, incumbent U.S. Representative

==== Republican Candidates ====
===== Advanced to general =====
- B.J. Guillot, software developer

==== Independent Candidates ====
===== Eliminated in primary =====
- Mike Lapointe

==== Results ====
Results by county Larsen: 50–60% 60–70%

Nonpartisan blanket primary results
| Party | Candidate | Votes | % |
|---|---|---|---|
| Democratic | Rick Larsen (incumbent) | 61,150 | 55.6 |
| Republican | B.J. Guillot | 36,002 | 32.7 |
| Independent | Mike Lapointe | 12,844 | 11.7 |
| Total votes | | 109,996 | 100.0 |

=== General election ===
==== Predictions ====
| Source | Ranking | As of |
|---|---|---|
| The Cook Political Report | Safe D | November 3, 2014 |
| Rothenberg | Safe D | October 24, 2014 |
| Sabato's Crystal Ball | Safe D | October 30, 2014 |
| RCP | Safe D | November 2, 2014 |
| Daily Kos Elections | Safe D | November 4, 2014 |

==== Results ====
2014 Washington's 2nd congressional district election
| Party | Candidate | Votes | % |
|---|---|---|---|
| Democratic | Rick Larsen (incumbent) | 122,173 | 60.6 |
| Republican | B.J. Guillot | 79,518 | 39.4 |
| Total votes | | 201,691 | 100.0 |
| Democratic hold | | | |

==== By county ====
County results
| County | Rick Larsen Democratic | | B.J. Guillot Republican | | Margin | | Total votes |
| County | # | % | # | % | # | % | Total votes |
|---|---|---|---|---|---|---|---|
| Island | 17,268 | 56.48% | 13,303 | 43.52% | 3,965 | 12.97% | 30,571 |
| San Juan | 5,570 | 69.21% | 2,478 | 30.79% | 3,092 | 38.42% | 8,048 |
| Skagit (part) | 13,783 | 55.53% | 11,037 | 44.47% | 2,746 | 11.06% | 24,820 |
| Snohomish (part) | 61,461 | 58.71% | 43,228 | 41.29% | 18,233 | 17.42% | 104,689 |
| Whatcom (part) | 24,091 | 71.78% | 9,472 | 28.22% | 14,619 | 43.56% | 33,563 |
| Totals | 122,173 | 60.57% | 79,518 | 39.43% | 42,655 | 21.15% | 201,691 |

== District 3 ==
2014 Washington's 3rd congressional district election
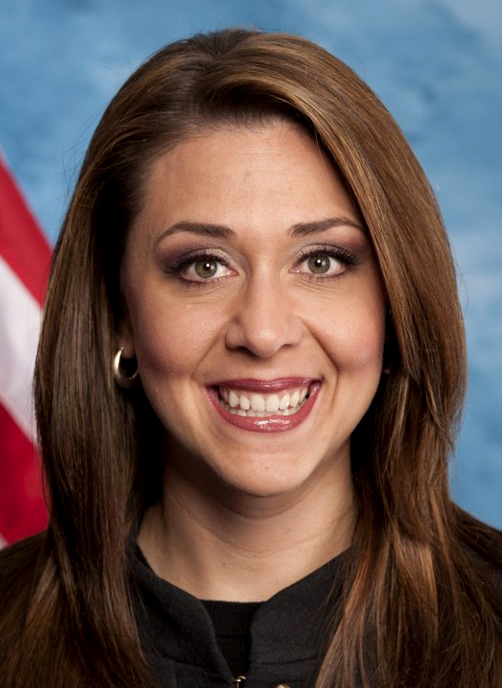

| Nominee | Jaime Herrera Beutler | Bob Dingethal |
| Party | Republican | Democratic |
| Popular vote | 124,796 | 78,018 |
| Percentage | 61.5% | 38.5% |
- County results Beutler: 50–60% 60–70% 70–80%
U.S. Representative before election
Jaime Herrera Beutler
Republican
Elected U.S. Representative
Jaime Herrera Beutler
Republican

Republican Jaime Herrera Beutler, who had represented the 3rd district since 2011, ran for re-election.

=== Primary election ===
==== Republican Candidates ====
===== Advanced to general =====
- Jaime Herrera Beutler, incumbent U.S. Representative

===== Eliminated in primary =====
- Michael Delavar, former councilman for Washougal and nominee for this seat in 2008

==== Democratic Candidates ====
===== Advanced to general =====
- Bob Dingethal, businessman and former Maria Cantwell aide

==== Results ====
Results by county Herrera Beutler: 40–50% 50–60% 60–70%; Dingethal: 40–50%

Nonpartisan blanket primary results
| Party | Candidate | Votes | % |
|---|---|---|---|
| Republican | Jaime Herrera Beutler (incumbent) | 58,913 | 48.8 |
| Democratic | Bob Dingethal | 45,788 | 37.9 |
| Republican | Michael Delavar | 15,959 | 13.2 |
| Total votes | | 120,660 | 100.0 |

=== General election ===
==== Predictions ====
| Source | Ranking | As of |
|---|---|---|
| The Cook Political Report | Safe R | November 3, 2014 |
| Rothenberg | Safe R | October 24, 2014 |
| Sabato's Crystal Ball | Safe R | October 30, 2014 |
| RCP | Safe R | November 2, 2014 |
| Daily Kos Elections | Safe R | November 4, 2014 |

==== Results ====
2014 Washington's 3rd congressional district election
| Party | Candidate | Votes | % |
|---|---|---|---|
| Republican | Jaime Herrera Beutler (incumbent) | 124,796 | 61.5 |
| Democratic | Bob Dingethal | 78,018 | 38.5 |
| Total votes | | 202,814 | 100.0 |
| Republican hold | | | |

==== By county ====
County results
| County | Jaime Herrera Beutler Republican | | Bob Dingethal Democratic | | Margin | | Total votes |
| County | # | % | # | % | # | % | Total votes |
|---|---|---|---|---|---|---|---|
| Clark | 72,877 | 59.45% | 49,710 | 40.55% | 23,167 | 18.90% | 122,587 |
| Cowlitz | 18,144 | 58.37% | 12,939 | 41.63% | 5,205 | 16.75% | 31,083 |
| Klickitat | 5,071 | 62.97% | 2,982 | 37.03% | 2,089 | 25.94% | 8,053 |
| Lewis | 18,522 | 77.50% | 5,376 | 22.50% | 13,146 | 55.01% | 23,898 |
| Pacific | 4,432 | 55.51% | 3,552 | 44.49% | 880 | 11.02% | 7,984 |
| Skamania | 2,473 | 62.32% | 1,495 | 37.68% | 978 | 24.65% | 3,968 |
| Thurston (part) | 2,215 | 63.78% | 1,258 | 36.22% | 957 | 27.56% | 3,473 |
| Wahkiakum | 1,062 | 60.07% | 706 | 39.93% | 356 | 20.14% | 1,768 |
| Totals | 124,796 | 61.53% | 78,018 | 38.47% | 46,778 | 23.06% | 202,814 |

== District 4 ==
2014 Washington's 4th congressional district election
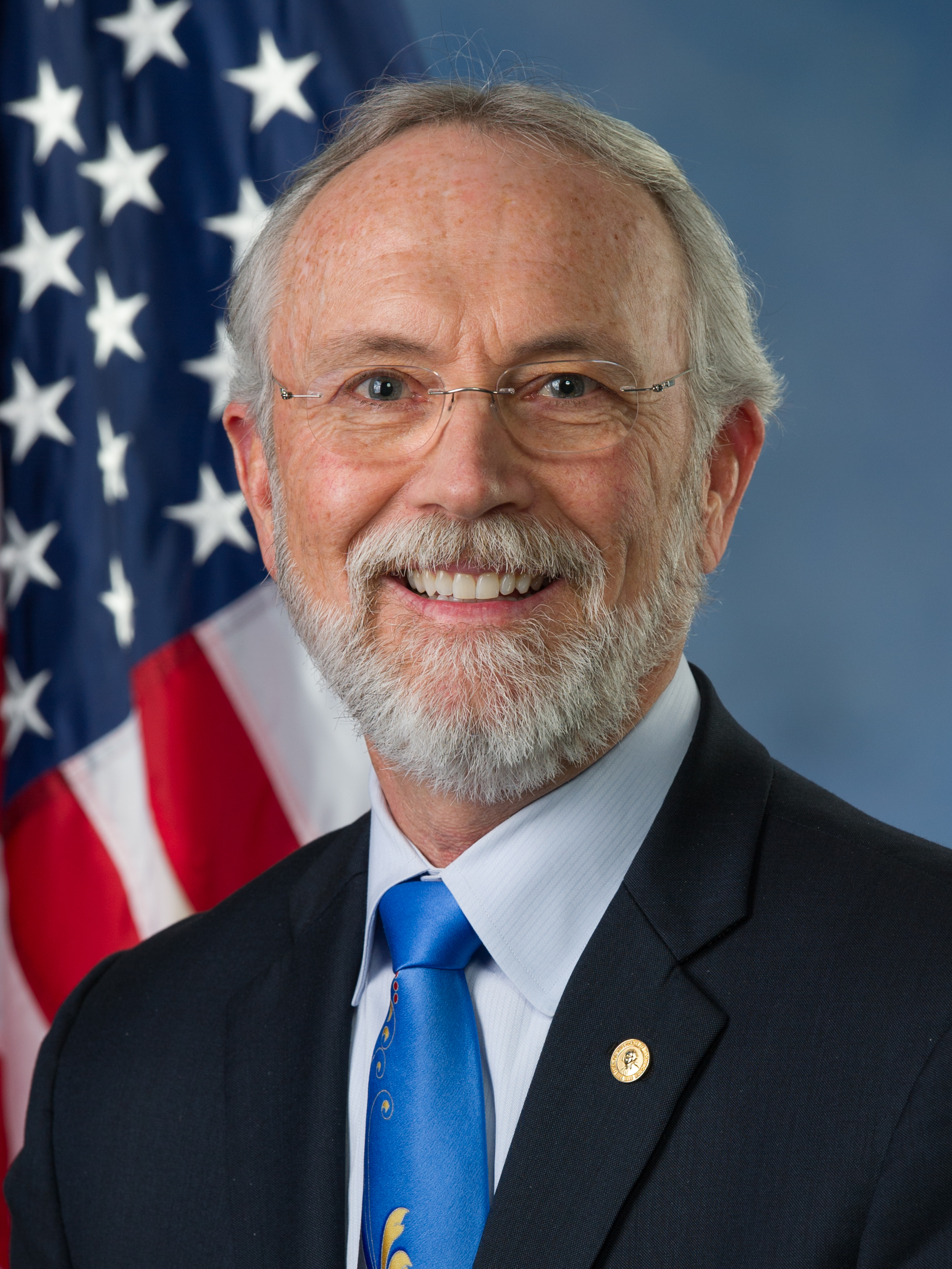

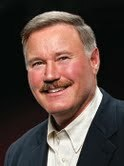
| Nominee | Dan Newhouse | Clint Didier |
| Party | Republican | Republican |
| Popular vote | 77,772 | 75,307 |
| Percentage | 50.8% | 49.2% |
- Newhouse: 50–60% 60–70% Didier: 50–60% 60–70%
U.S. Representative before election
Doc Hastings
Republican
Elected U.S. Representative
Dan Newhouse
Republican

Republican Doc Hastings, who had represented the 4th district since 1995, retired.

The 4th district is a large and predominantly rural district in Central Washington that encompasses numerous counties and is dominated by the Tri-Cities and Yakima areas. The district was not considered to be competitive. The last time any Democrat running for any partisan office carried it was when State Auditor Brian Sonntag was re-elected in 2004.

=== Primary election ===
==== Republican Candidates ====
===== Advanced to general =====
- Clint Didier, former NFL player, candidate for the U.S. Senate in 2010 and nominee for Washington Commissioner of Public Lands in 2012
- Dan Newhouse, former director of the Washington State Department of Agriculture under Christine Gregoire and Jay Inslee and former state representative

===== Eliminated in primary =====
- George Cicotte, attorney
- Janéa Holmquist Newbry, state senator
- Kevin Midbust, drugstore supervisor
- Gordon Allen Pross, perennial candidate
- Gavin Seim, libertarian activist
- Glen R. Stockwell, economic development specialist

===== Withdrawn =====
- Brad Peck, Franklin County Commissioner
- Jamie Wheeler, caregiver and candidate for this seat in 2012

===== Declined =====
- Sharon Brown, state senator
- Micah Cawley, Mayor of Yakima
- Bruce Chandler, state representative
- Jerome Delvin, Benton County Commissioner and former state senator
- Doc Hastings, incumbent U.S. Representative
- Curtis King, state senator
- Brad Klippert, state representative and candidate for the U.S. Senate in 2004 and 2006
- Matt Manweller, state representative
- Charles Ross, state representative
- David Taylor, state representative
- Judith Warnick, state representative (running for the state senate)

==== Democratic Candidates ====
===== Eliminated in primary =====
- Estakio Beltran, former congressional policy adviser
- Tony Sandoval, businessman and activist

===== Withdrawn =====
- Joe Buchanan, mechanical engineer
- Gary Downing, artist and photographer
- Mohammed Said, physician and candidate for this seat in 2012
- Tony Williams

==== Independent Candidates ====
===== Eliminated in primary =====
- Josh Ramirez, project control specialist at Washington River Protection Solutions
- Richard Wright, retired physical therapist

==== Endorsements ====
Estakio Beltran (D)

Labor unions

- Hanford Atomic Metal Trades Council
- Operative Plasterers' and Cement Masons' International Association Local 478
- Southeast Washington Central Labor Council
- Teamsters Local Union No. 839
- Washington State Building and Construction Trades Council
- Washington State Labor Council
George Cicotte (R)

Organizations

- The Conservative Party of Washington

Local officials

- Steve Keane, Sheriff, Benton County
- Ozzie Knezovich, Sheriff, Spokane County

Individuals

- Roger Hastings, founder of Petersen Hastings
- Rand Wortman, CEO Kadlec Health Systems
Clint Didier (R)

U.S. Representatives

- Ron Paul, former U.S. Representative (R-TX) and candidate for President in 2008 and 2012

Organizations

- FreedomWorks
- Human Life of Washington
- National Association for Gun Rights
Janéa Holmquist Newbry (R)

Local officials

- Micah Cawley, Mayor of Yakima
Dan Newhouse (R)

U.S. Representatives

- Doc Hastings, incumbent U.S. Representative

State legislators

- Bruce Chandler, state representative
- Jerome Delvin, former state senator and Benton County Commissioner
- Larry Haler, state representative
- Jim Honeyford, state senator
- Norm Johnson, state representative
- Curtis King, state senator
- Terry Nealey, state representative
- Charles Ross, state representative
- Maureen Walsh, state representative

Organizations

- National Rifle Association - Political Victory Fund

Local officials

- Maureen Adkison, Yakima City Council member
- Jim Beaver, Benton County Commissioner
- Kevin Bouchey, Yakima County Commissioner
- Kathy Coffey, Yakima City Council member
- Thomas Dittmar, Yakima City Council member
- Rand Elliott, Yakima County Commissioner
- Steve Young, Mayor of Kennewick

==== Results ====
Results by county Didier: 30–40% 40–50% 50–60%; Newhouse: 40–50%

For the first time in Washington state history, the winners of the top-two primary for a U.S. Congressional race were members of the same party. Although only one "serious" Democratic candidate was on the ballot, Estakio Beltran, David Wasserman of The Cook Political Report speculated that without an incumbent for Democrats to vote against and recognising that Beltran had "no hope" of winning the seat in November, 4th district Democrats might have "strategically [voted] for a Republican they may favor."

Nonpartisan blanket primary results
| Party | Candidate | Votes | % |
|---|---|---|---|
| Republican | Clint Didier | 33,965 | 31.8 |
| Republican | Dan Newhouse | 27,326 | 25.6 |
| Democratic | Estakio Beltran | 13,062 | 12.2 |
| Republican | Janéa Holmquist Newbry | 11,061 | 10.4 |
| Republican | George Cicotte | 6,863 | 6.4 |
| Democratic | Tony Sandoval | 6,744 | 6.3 |
| Independent | Richard Wright | 3,270 | 3.1 |
| Republican | Gavin Seim | 2,107 | 2.0 |
| Independent | Josh Ramirez | 1,496 | 1.4 |
| Republican | Glen R. Stockwell | 547 | 0.5 |
| Republican | Gordon Allen Pross | 178 | 0.2 |
| Republican | Kevin Midbust | 161 | 0.2 |
| Total votes | | 106,780 | 100.0 |

=== General election ===
==== Polling ====
| Poll source | Date(s) administered | Sample size | Margin of error | Dan Newhouse (R) | Clint Didier (R) | Undecided |
|---|---|---|---|---|---|---|
| The Polling Company | September 16–17, 2014 | 400 | ± 4.9% | 33% | 35% | 26% |

==== Predictions ====
| Source | Ranking | As of |
|---|---|---|
| The Cook Political Report | Safe R | November 3, 2014 |
| Rothenberg | Safe R | October 24, 2014 |
| Sabato's Crystal Ball | Safe R | October 30, 2014 |
| RCP | Safe R | November 2, 2014 |
| Daily Kos Elections | Safe R | November 4, 2014 |

==== Results ====
2014 Washington's 4th congressional district election
| Party | Candidate | Votes | % |
|---|---|---|---|
| Republican | Dan Newhouse | 77,772 | 50.8 |
| Republican | Clint Didier | 75,307 | 49.2 |
| Total votes | | 153,079 | 100.0 |
| Republican hold | | | |

==== By county ====
County results
| County | Dan Newhouse Republican | | Clint Didier Republican | | Margin | | Total votes |
| County | # | % | # | % | # | % | Total votes |
|---|---|---|---|---|---|---|---|
| Adams | 1,336 | 41.18% | 1,908 | 58.82% | -572 | -17.63% | 3,244 |
| Benton | 25,788 | 50.82% | 24,955 | 49.18% | 833 | 1.64% | 50,743 |
| Douglas (part) | 2,492 | 44.40% | 3,121 | 55.60% | -629 | -11.21% | 5,613 |
| Franklin | 6,561 | 45.24% | 7,942 | 54.76% | -1,381 | -9.52% | 14,503 |
| Grant | 7,370 | 38.20% | 11,923 | 61.80% | -4,553 | -23.60% | 19,293 |
| Okanogan | 5,159 | 47.93% | 5,604 | 52.07% | -445 | -4.13% | 10,763 |
| Walla Walla (part) | 608 | 38.58% | 968 | 61.42% | -360 | -22.84% | 1,576 |
| Yakima | 28,458 | 60.11% | 18,886 | 39.89% | 9,572 | 20.22% | 47,344 |
| Totals | 77,772 | 50.81% | 75,307 | 49.19% | 2,465 | 1.61% | 153,079 |

== District 5 ==
2014 Washington's 5th congressional district election
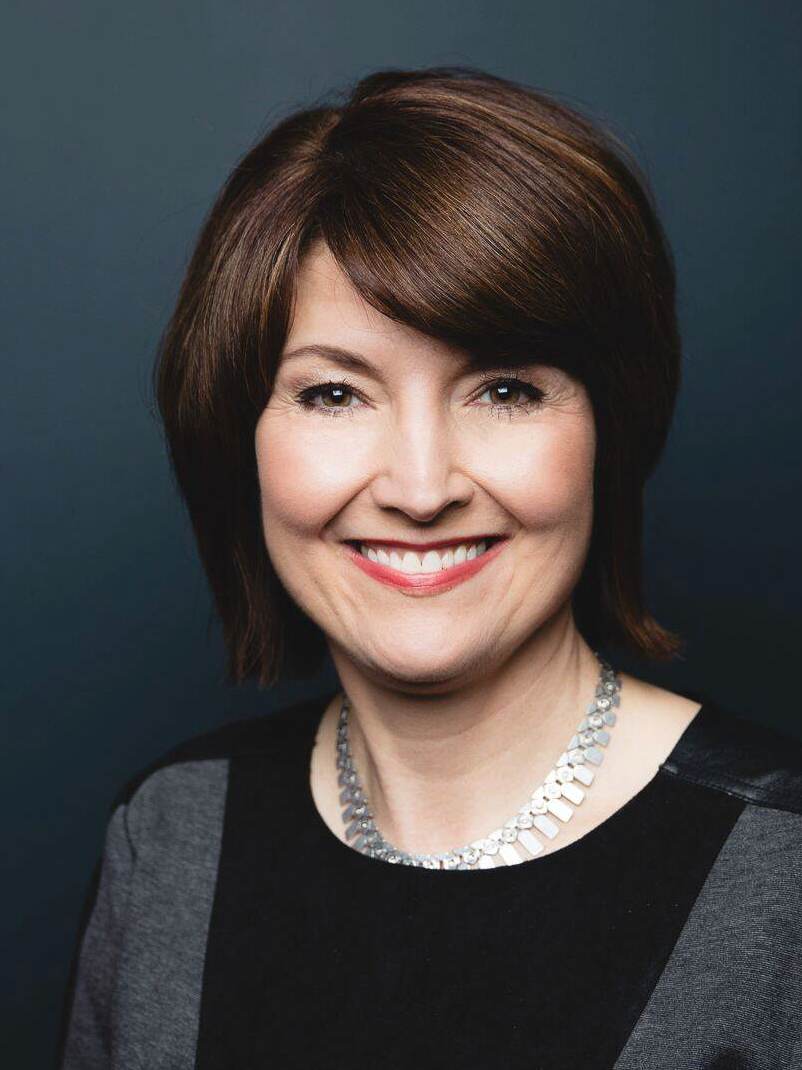

| Nominee | Cathy McMorris Rodgers | Joe Pakootas |
| Party | Republican | Democratic |
| Popular vote | 135,470 | 87,772 |
| Percentage | 60.7% | 39.3% |
- Rodgers: 50–60% 60–70% 70–80%
U.S. Representative before election
Cathy McMorris Rodgers
Republican
Elected U.S. Representative
Cathy McMorris Rodgers
Republican

Republican Cathy McMorris Rodgers the House Republican Conference Chair, who had represented the 5th district since 2005, ran for re-election.

=== Primary election ===
==== Republican Candidates ====
===== Advanced to general =====
- Cathy McMorris Rodgers, incumbent U.S. Representative

===== Eliminated in primary =====
- Tom Horne

==== Democratic Candidates ====
===== Advanced to general =====
- Joseph Pakootas, chief executive officer of the Colville Tribal Federal Corporation

==== Results ====
Results by county McMorris Rodgers: 40–50% 50–60% 60–70% 70–80%

Nonpartisan blanket primary results
| Party | Candidate | Votes | % |
|---|---|---|---|
| Republican | Cathy McMorris Rodgers (incumbent) | 74,416 | 51.7 |
| Democratic | Joseph Pakootas | 41,203 | 28.7 |
| Independent | Dave Wilson | 16,382 | 11.4 |
| Republican | Tom Horne | 11,811 | 8.2 |
| Total votes | | 143,812 | 100.0 |

=== General election ===
==== Predictions ====
| Source | Ranking | As of |
|---|---|---|
| The Cook Political Report | Safe R | November 3, 2014 |
| Rothenberg | Safe R | October 24, 2014 |
| Sabato's Crystal Ball | Safe R | October 30, 2014 |
| RCP | Safe R | November 2, 2014 |
| Daily Kos Elections | Safe R | November 4, 2014 |

==== Results ====
2014 Washington's 5th congressional district election
| Party | Candidate | Votes | % |
|---|---|---|---|
| Republican | Cathy McMorris Rodgers (incumbent) | 135,470 | 60.7 |
| Democratic | Joseph Pakootas | 87,772 | 39.3 |
| Total votes | | 223,242 | 100.0 |
| Republican hold | | | |

==== By county ====
County results
| County | Cathy McMorris Rodgers Republican | | Joseph Pakootas Democratic | | Margin | | Total votes |
| County | # | % | # | % | # | % | Total votes |
|---|---|---|---|---|---|---|---|
| Asotin | 4,553 | 60.15% | 3,016 | 39.85% | 1,537 | 20.31% | 7,569 |
| Columbia | 1,379 | 74.06% | 483 | 25.94% | 896 | 48.12% | 1,862 |
| Ferry | 1,695 | 57.50% | 1,253 | 42.50% | 442 | 14.99% | 2,948 |
| Garfield | 892 | 76.11% | 280 | 23.89% | 612 | 52.22% | 1,172 |
| Lincoln | 3,275 | 73.20% | 1,199 | 26.80% | 2,076 | 46.40% | 4,474 |
| Pend Oreille | 3,179 | 62.58% | 1,901 | 37.42% | 1,278 | 25.16% | 5,080 |
| Spokane | 92,198 | 59.50% | 62,763 | 40.50% | 29,435 | 19.00% | 154,961 |
| Stevens | 11,008 | 64.04% | 6,180 | 35.96% | 4,828 | 28.09% | 17,188 |
| Walla Walla (part) | 10,603 | 63.82% | 6,012 | 36.18% | 4,591 | 27.63% | 16,615 |
| Whitman | 6,688 | 58.81% | 4,685 | 41.19% | 2,003 | 17.61% | 11,373 |
| Totals | 135,470 | 60.68% | 87,772 | 39.32% | 47,698 | 21.37% | 223,242 |

== District 6 ==
2014 Washington's 6th congressional district election
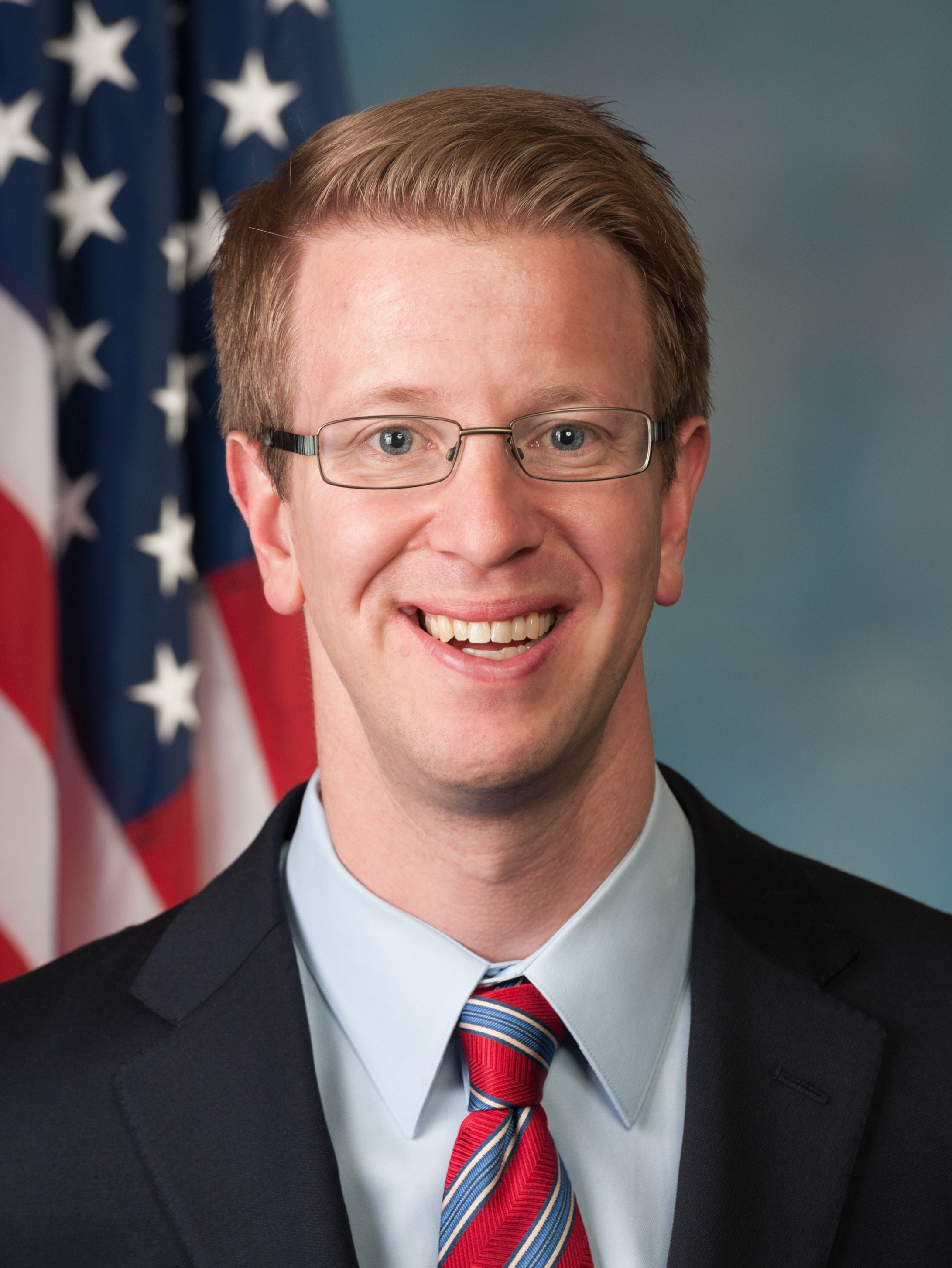

| Nominee | Derek Kilmer | Marty McClendon |
| Party | Democratic | Republican |
| Popular vote | 141,265 | 83,025 |
| Percentage | 63.0% | 37.0% |
- County results Kilmer: 50–60% 60–70% 70–80%
U.S. Representative before election
Derek Kilmer
Democratic
Elected U.S. Representative
Derek Kilmer
Democratic

Democrat Derek Kilmer who had represented the 6th district since 2013, ran for re-election.

=== Primary election ===
==== Democratic Candidates ====
===== Advanced to general =====
- Derek Kilmer, incumbent U.S. Representative

==== Republican Candidates ====
===== Advanced to general =====
- Marty McClendon, radio host

==== Results ====
Results by county Kilmer: 50–60% 60–70%

Nonpartisan blanket primary results
| Party | Candidate | Votes | % |
|---|---|---|---|
| Democratic | Derek Kilmer (incumbent) | 82,552 | 58.7 |
| Republican | Marty McClendon | 48,268 | 34.3 |
| Green | Douglas Milholland | 4,918 | 3.5 |
| No party preference | W. (Greybeard) McPherson | 4,890 | 3.5 |
| Total votes | | 140,628 | 100.0 |

=== General election ===
==== Predictions ====
| Source | Ranking | As of |
|---|---|---|
| The Cook Political Report | Safe D | November 3, 2014 |
| Rothenberg | Safe D | October 24, 2014 |
| Sabato's Crystal Ball | Safe D | October 30, 2014 |
| RCP | Safe D | November 2, 2014 |
| Daily Kos Elections | Safe D | November 4, 2014 |

==== Results ====
2014 Washington's 6th congressional district election
| Party | Candidate | Votes | % |
|---|---|---|---|
| Democratic | Derek Kilmer (incumbent) | 141,265 | 63.0 |
| Republican | Marty McClendon | 83,025 | 37.0 |
| Total votes | | 224,290 | 100.0 |
| Democratic hold | | | |

==== By county ====
County results
| County | Derek Kilmer Democratic | | Marty McClendon Republican | | Margin | | Total votes |
| County | # | % | # | % | # | % | Total votes |
|---|---|---|---|---|---|---|---|
| Clallam | 16,001 | 56.82% | 12,159 | 43.18% | 3,842 | 13.64% | 28,160 |
| Grays Harbor | 12,540 | 63.84% | 7,103 | 36.16% | 5,437 | 27.68% | 19,643 |
| Jefferson | 11,056 | 71.37% | 4,435 | 28.63% | 6,621 | 42.74% | 15,491 |
| Kitsap | 52,160 | 62.45% | 31,367 | 37.55% | 20,793 | 24.89% | 83,527 |
| Mason (part) | 8,683 | 55.83% | 6,869 | 44.17% | 1,814 | 11.66% | 15,552 |
| Pierce (part) | 40,825 | 65.94% | 21,092 | 34.06% | 19,733 | 31.87% | 61,917 |
| Totals | 141,265 | 62.98% | 83,025 | 37.02% | 58,240 | 25.97% | 224,290 |

== District 7 ==
2014 Washington's 7th congressional district election
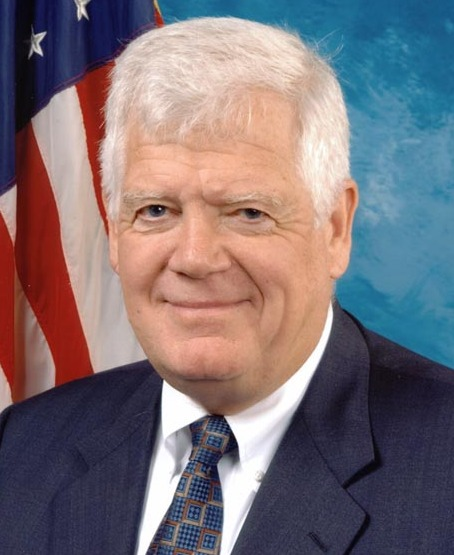

| Nominee | Jim McDermott | Craig Keller |
| Party | Democratic | Republican |
| Popular vote | 203,954 | 47,921 |
| Percentage | 81.0% | 19.0% |
- County results McDermott: 60–70% 80–90%
U.S. Representative before election
Jim McDermott
Democratic
Elected U.S. Representative
Jim McDermott
Democratic

Democrat Jim McDermott who had represented the 7th district since 1989, ran for re-election.

=== Primary election ===
==== Democratic Candidates ====
===== Advanced to general =====
- Jim McDermott, incumbent U.S. Representative

==== Republican Candidates ====
===== Advanced to general =====
- Craig Keller

===== Eliminated in primary =====
- Scott Sutherland, candidate for this seat in 2012

==== Results ====
Results by county McDermott: 60–70% 70–80%

Nonpartisan blanket primary results
| Party | Candidate | Votes | % |
|---|---|---|---|
| Democratic | Jim McDermott (incumbent) | 114,039 | 76.9 |
| Republican | Craig Keller | 13,586 | 9.2 |
| Republican | Scott Sutherland | 9,707 | 6.5 |
| Independent | Doug McQuaid | 9,371 | 6.3 |
| Independent | Goodspaceguy | 1,665 | 1.1 |
| Total votes | | 148,368 | 100.0 |

=== General election ===
==== Predictions ====
| Source | Ranking | As of |
|---|---|---|
| The Cook Political Report | Safe D | November 3, 2014 |
| Rothenberg | Safe D | October 24, 2014 |
| Sabato's Crystal Ball | Safe D | October 30, 2014 |
| RCP | Safe D | November 2, 2014 |
| Daily Kos Elections | Safe D | November 4, 2014 |

==== Results ====
2014 Washington's 7th congressional district election
| Party | Candidate | Votes | % |
|---|---|---|---|
| Democratic | Jim McDermott (incumbent) | 203,954 | 81.0 |
| Republican | Craig Keller | 47,921 | 19.0 |
| Total votes | | 251,875 | 100.0 |
| Democratic hold | | | |

==== By county ====
County results
| County | Jim McDermott Democratic | | Craig Keller Republican | | Margin | | Total votes |
| County | # | % | # | % | # | % | Total votes |
|---|---|---|---|---|---|---|---|
| King (part) | 192,403 | 82.39% | 41,128 | 17.61% | 151,275 | 64.78% | 233,531 |
| Snohomish (part) | 11,551 | 62.97% | 6,793 | 37.03% | 4,758 | 25.94% | 18,344 |
| Totals | 203,954 | 80.97% | 47,921 | 19.03% | 156,033 | 61.95% | 251,875 |

== District 8 ==
2014 Washington's 8th congressional district election
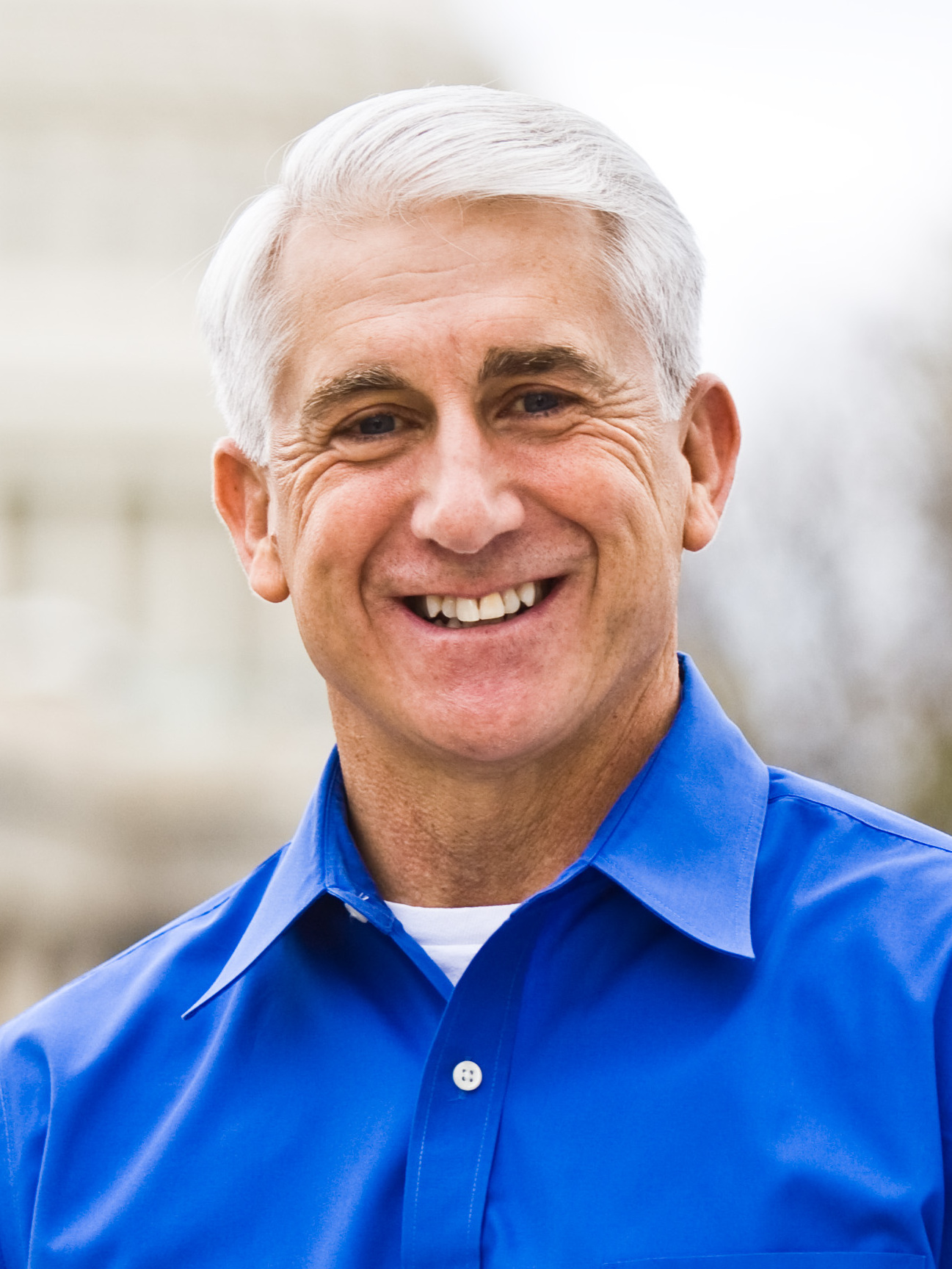

| Nominee | Dave Reichert | Jason Ritchie |
| Party | Republican | Democratic |
| Popular vote | 125,741 | 73,003 |
| Percentage | 63.3% | 36.7% |
- Reichert: 50–60% 60–70% 70–80%
U.S. Representative before election
Dave Reichert
Republican
Elected U.S. Representative
Dave Reichert
Republican

Republican Dave Reichert, who had represented the 8th district since 2005, ran for re-election.

=== Primary election ===
==== Republican Candidates ====
===== Advanced to general =====
- Dave Reichert, incumbent U.S. Representative

==== Democratic Candidates ====
===== Advanced to general =====
- Jason Ritchie, small business owner

===== Eliminated in primary =====
- Keith Arnold, accounting technician

==== Results ====
Results by county Reichert: 50–60% 60–70% 70–80%

Nonpartisan blanket primary results
| Party | Candidate | Votes | % |
|---|---|---|---|
| Republican | Dave Reichert (incumbent) | 66,715 | 62.5 |
| Democratic | Jason Ritchie | 30,759 | 28.8 |
| Democratic | Keith Arnold | 9,273 | 8.7 |
| Total votes | | 106,747 | 100.0 |

=== General election ===
==== Predictions ====
| Source | Ranking | As of |
|---|---|---|
| The Cook Political Report | Safe R | November 3, 2014 |
| Rothenberg | Safe R | October 24, 2014 |
| Sabato's Crystal Ball | Safe R | October 30, 2014 |
| RCP | Safe R | November 2, 2014 |
| Daily Kos Elections | Safe R | November 4, 2014 |

==== Results ====
2014 Washington's 8th congressional district election
| Party | Candidate | Votes | % |
|---|---|---|---|
| Republican | Dave Reichert (incumbent) | 125,741 | 63.3 |
| Democratic | Jason Ritchie | 73,003 | 36.7 |
| Total votes | | 198,744 | 100.0 |
| Republican hold | | | |

==== By county ====
County results
| County | Dave Reichert Republican | | Jason Ritchie Democratic | | Margin | | Total votes |
| County | # | % | # | % | # | % | Total votes |
|---|---|---|---|---|---|---|---|
| Chelan | 15,584 | 70.24% | 6,604 | 29.76% | 8,980 | 40.47% | 22,188 |
| Douglas (part) | 3,236 | 73.28% | 1,180 | 26.72% | 2,056 | 46.56% | 4,416 |
| King (part) | 67,873 | 59.19% | 46,800 | 40.81% | 21,073 | 18.38% | 114,673 |
| Kittitas | 8,365 | 66.81% | 4,156 | 33.19% | 4,209 | 33.62% | 12,521 |
| Pierce (part) | 30,683 | 68.27% | 14,263 | 31.73% | 16,420 | 36.53% | 44,946 |
| Totals | 125,741 | 63.27% | 73,003 | 36.73% | 52,738 | 26.54% | 198,744 |

== District 9 ==
2014 Washington's 9th congressional district election
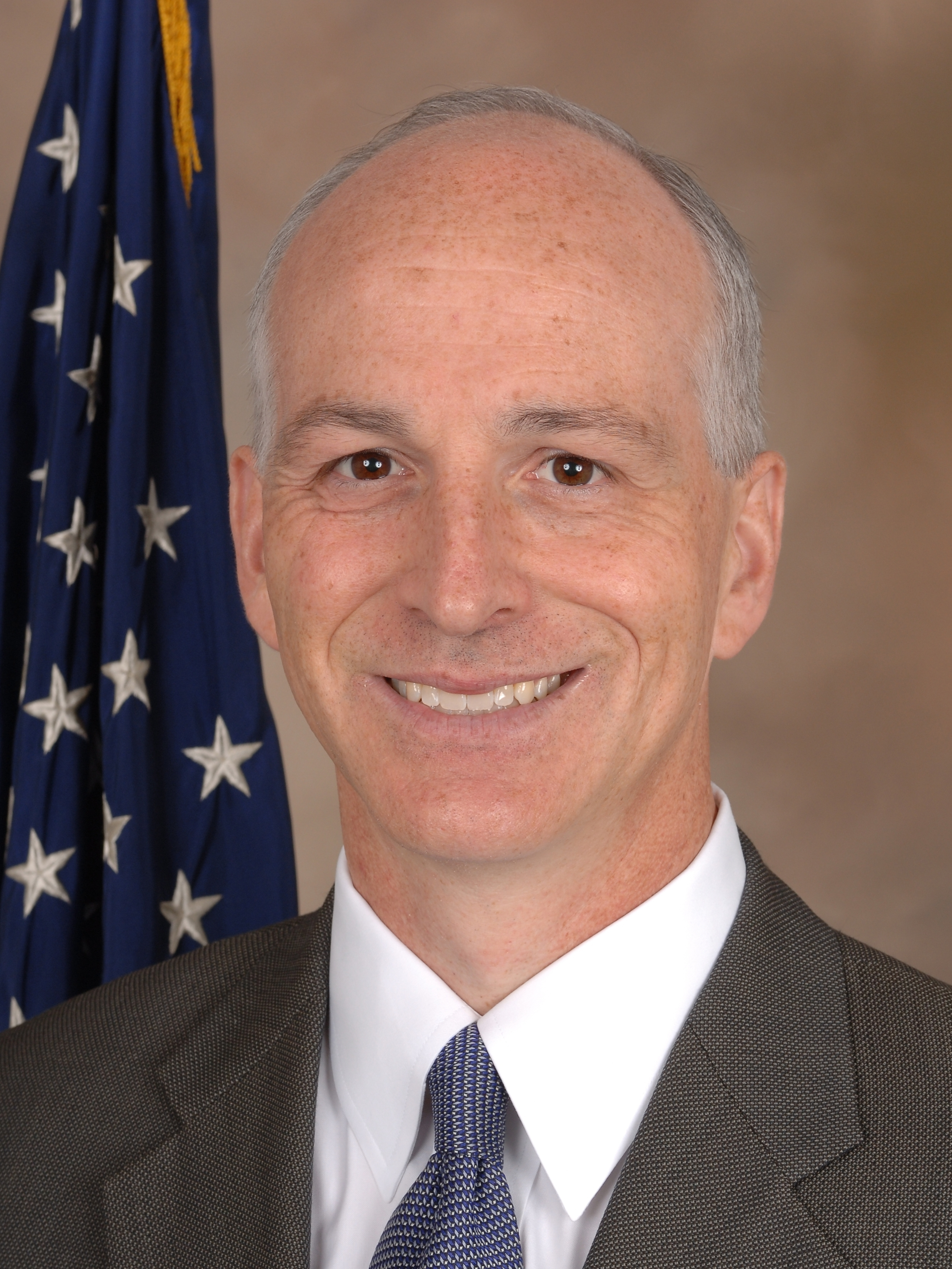

| Nominee | Adam Smith | Doug Basler |
| Party | Democratic | Republican |
| Popular vote | 118,132 | 48,662 |
| Percentage | 70.8% | 29.2% |
- County results Smith: 50–60% 70–80%
U.S. Representative before election
Adam Smith
Democratic
Elected U.S. Representative
Adam Smith
Democratic

Democrat Adam Smith, who had represented the 9th district since 1997, ran for re-election.

=== Primary election ===
==== Democratic Candidates ====
===== Advanced to general =====
- Adam Smith, incumbent U.S. Representative

===== Eliminated in primary =====
- Don Rivers, human rights activist

==== Republican Candidates ====
===== Advanced to general =====
- Doug Basler, volunteer youth pastor

==== Results ====
Results by county Smith: 50–60% 60–70%

Nonpartisan blanket primary results
| Party | Candidate | Votes | % |
|---|---|---|---|
| Democratic | Adam Smith (incumbent) | 59,489 | 64.0 |
| Republican | Doug Basler | 25,290 | 27.2 |
| Democratic | Don Rivers | 5,434 | 5.8 |
| Independent | Mark Greene (Note: Listed on ballot as "Citizens Party") | 2,737 | 2.9 |
| Total votes | | 92,950 | 100.0 |

=== General election ===
==== Predictions ====
| Source | Ranking | As of |
|---|---|---|
| The Cook Political Report | Safe D | November 3, 2014 |
| Rothenberg | Safe D | October 24, 2014 |
| Sabato's Crystal Ball | Safe D | October 30, 2014 |
| RCP | Safe D | November 2, 2014 |
| Daily Kos Elections | Safe D | November 4, 2014 |

==== Results ====
2014 Washington's 9th congressional district election
| Party | Candidate | Votes | % |
|---|---|---|---|
| Democratic | Adam Smith (incumbent) | 118,132 | 70.8 |
| Republican | Doug Basler | 48,662 | 29.2 |
| Total votes | | 166,794 | 100.0 |
| Democratic hold | | | |

==== By county ====
County results
| County | Adam Smith Democratic | | Doug Basler Republican | | Margin | | Total votes |
| County | # | % | # | % | # | % | Total votes |
|---|---|---|---|---|---|---|---|
| King (part) | 114,503 | 71.24% | 46,217 | 28.76% | 68,286 | 42.49% | 160,720 |
| Pierce (part) | 3,629 | 59.75% | 2,445 | 40.25% | 1,184 | 19.49% | 6,074 |
| Totals | 118,132 | 70.83% | 48,662 | 29.17% | 69,470 | 41.65% | 166,794 |

== District 10 ==
2014 Washington's 10th congressional district election
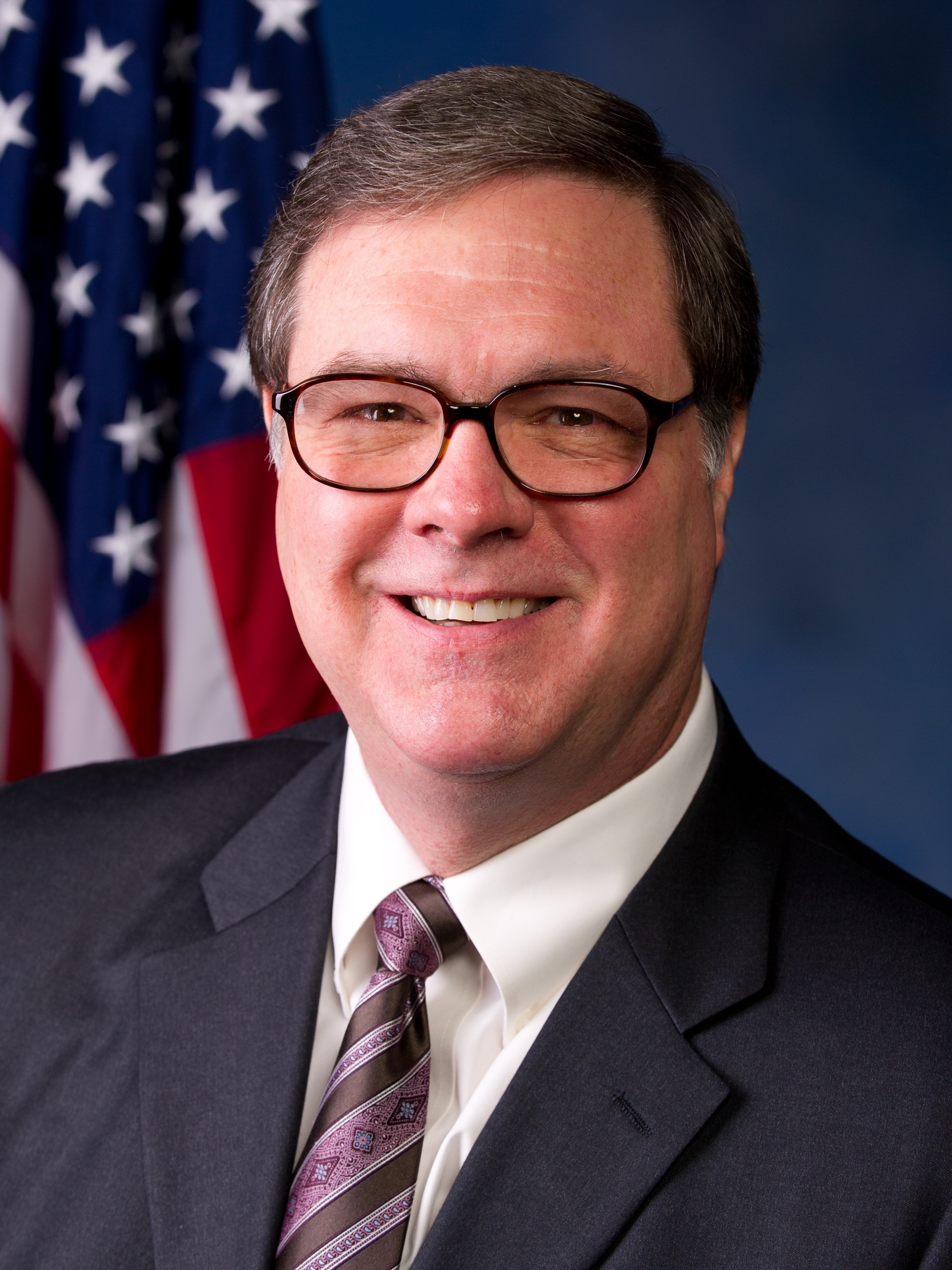

| Nominee | Denny Heck | Joyce McDonald |
| Party | Democratic | Republican |
| Popular vote | 99,279 | 82,213 |
| Percentage | 54.7% | 45.3% |
- Heck: 50–60% 60–70%
U.S. Representative before election
Denny Heck
Democratic
Elected U.S. Representative
Denny Heck
Democratic

Democrat Denny Heck, who had represented the 10th district since 2013, ran for re-election.

=== Primary election ===
==== Democratic Candidates ====
===== Advanced to general =====
- Denny Heck, incumbent U.S. Representative

==== Republican Candidates ====
===== Advanced to general =====
- Joyce McDonald, Pierce County Council member and former state representative

==== Results ====
Results by county Heck: 50–60%; McDonald: 40–50%

Nonpartisan blanket primary results
| Party | Candidate | Votes | % |
|---|---|---|---|
| Democratic | Denny Heck (incumbent) | 51,738 | 51.6 |
| Republican | Joyce McDonald | 41,416 | 41.3 |
| Independent | Jennifer Gigi Ferguson | 4,811 | 4.8 |
| Independent | Sam Wright | 2,342 | 2.3 |
| Total votes | | 100,307 | 100.0 |

=== General election ===
==== Predictions ====
| Source | Ranking | As of |
|---|---|---|
| The Cook Political Report | Safe D | November 3, 2014 |
| Rothenberg | Safe D | October 24, 2014 |
| Sabato's Crystal Ball | Safe D | October 30, 2014 |
| RCP | Safe D | November 2, 2014 |
| Daily Kos Elections | Safe D | November 4, 2014 |

==== Results ====
2014 Washington's 10th congressional district election
| Party | Candidate | Votes | % |
|---|---|---|---|
| Democratic | Denny Heck (incumbent) | 99,279 | 54.7 |
| Republican | Joyce McDonald | 82,213 | 45.3 |
| Total votes | | 181,492 | 100.0 |
| Democratic hold | | | |

==== By county ====
County results
| County | Denny Heck Democratic | | Joyce McDonald Republican | | Margin | | Total votes |
| County | # | % | # | % | # | % | Total votes |
|---|---|---|---|---|---|---|---|
| Mason (part) | 2,628 | 59.39% | 1,797 | 40.61% | 831 | 18.78% | 4,425 |
| Pierce (part) | 49,348 | 50.19% | 48,965 | 49.81% | 383 | 0.39% | 98,313 |
| Thurston (part) | 47,303 | 60.06% | 31,451 | 39.94% | 15,852 | 20.13% | 78,754 |
| Totals | 99,279 | 54.70% | 82,213 | 45.30% | 17,066 | 9.40% | 181,492 |
