= Mardesich =

Mardesich is a surname. Notable people with the surname include:

- August P. Mardesich (1920–2016), American politician
- Tony P. Mardesich (1919–1949), American politician
