= Senator Ludwig =

Senator Ludwig may refer to:

- Curtis Ludwig (1929–2012), Washington State Senate
- Joe Ludwig (born 1959), Senate of Australia
- Margaret Ludwig (1933–2017), Maine State Senate
