= Senator Canfield =

Senator Canfield may refer to:

- Damon Canfield (1897–1992), Washington State Senate
- Robert R. Canfield (1909–1994), Illinois State Senate
