= Larry Vognild =

American politician

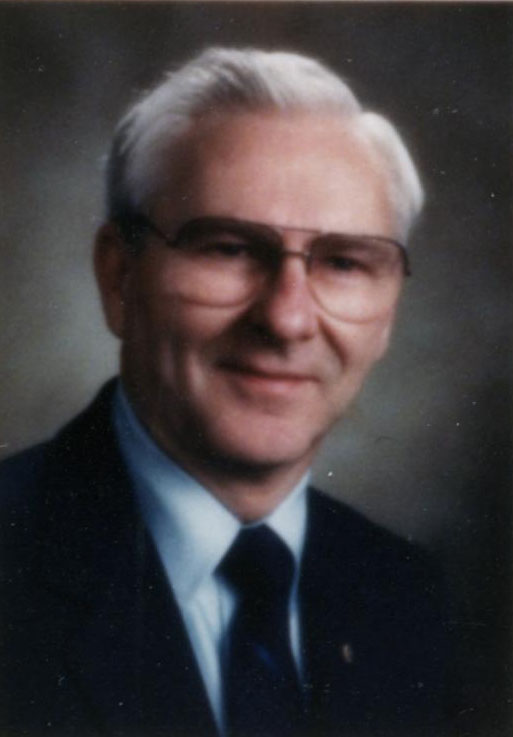
- Vognild in 1987

Minority Leader of the Washington Senate
- In office January 11, 1988 – January 14, 1991
- Preceded by: Jeannette C. Hayner
- Succeeded by: Marcus Gaspard

Member of the Washington Senate from the 38th district
- In office January 8, 1979 – January 9, 1995
- Preceded by: August P. Mardesich
- Succeeded by: Gary Strannigan

Personal details
- Born: Larry Lee Vognild; January 21, 1932 Spokane, Washington, U.S.
- Died: January 3, 2014 (aged 81) Everett, Washington, U.S.
- Party: Democratic
- Spouse: Dorothy Vognild
- Children: 2
- Profession: Firefighter

Larry Lee Vognild (January 21, 1932 – January 3, 2014) was an American firefighter and politician.

Vognild was a member of the Everett, Washington fire department. He served in the Washington State Senate from 1978 until 1994 as a Democrat. He died at age 81.
