= Stephanie Barnard =

American politician

Member of the Washington House of Representatives from the 8th district
- Incumbent
- Assumed office January 9, 2023 Serving with April Connors
- Preceded by: Brad Klippert

Personal details
- Party: Republican
- Children: 6
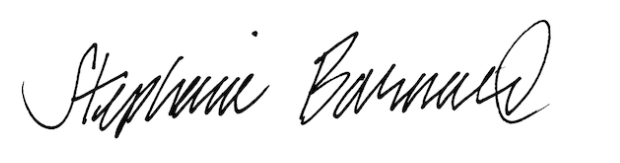
- Signature

Stephanie Barnard is an American politician who is a member of the Washington House of Representatives for the 8th district. Elected in November 2022, she assumed office on January 9, 2023, replacing Brad Klippert.

== Career ==
Since 2018, Barnard has worked as the government affairs manager for the Tri-City Regional Chamber of Commerce. She was elected to the Washington House of Representatives in November 2022 and assumed office on January 9, 2023.
