= Washington's 8th legislative district =

American legislative district

Washington 8th legislative district map

Washington's 8th legislative district is one of forty-nine districts in Washington state for representation in the state legislature. The district includes parts of Benton and Franklin Counties. The district includes part or all of the cities of Kennewick, Pasco, Richland, and West Richland. It was most recently redrawn as a part of the Soto Palmer v. Hobbs decision in 2024.

The district is represented by state senator Matt Boehnke (R) and state representatives Stephanie Barnard (R; position 1), and April Connors (R; position 2).

== Past legislators ==
=== Statehood-1932 ===
During this period, the state senate and state house districts were geographically distinct.

Year	Senate		House		
Year	Senator	Senate District Geography	House Position 1	House Position 2	House District Geography
1st (1889-1890)	Platt A. Preston (R) (Note: This district was represented by two senators simultaneously from 1889-1890.)	Walla Walla County			
1st (1889-1890)	George T. Thompson (R)	Walla Walla County			
2nd (1891-1892)	C. G. Austin (R)	Asotin, Columbia, and Garfield	House District Established		Asotin County
2nd (1891-1892)	C. G. Austin (R)	Asotin, Columbia, and Garfield	William Farrish (R) (Note: Elected Speaker of the House for the 3rd legislative session (1893-94)		Asotin County
3rd (1893-1894)	J. A. Kellogg (R)	Asotin, Columbia, and Garfield	William Farrish (R)		Asotin County
4th (1895-1896)	J. A. Kellogg (R)	Asotin, Columbia, and Garfield	C. E. Gibson (P.P)		Asotin County
5th (1897-1898)	J. C. Van Patten (Pop.), (P.P) (Note: Changed party affiliation from Populist Party to People's Party in 1899)	Asotin, Columbia, and Garfield	R. W. Caywood (Pop.)		Asotin County
6th (1899-1900)	J. C. Van Patten (Pop.), (P.P)	Asotin, Columbia, and Garfield	John F. Chrisman (R)		Asotin County
7th (1901-1902)	Edward Baumeister (R)	Asotin, Columbia, and Garfield	John F. Chrisman (R)		Asotin County
8th (1903-1904)	G. B. Wilson (R)	Whitman County (part)	J. A. Dix (R)	Position Established	Whitman County (part)
8th (1903-1904)	G. B. Wilson (R)	Whitman County (part)	J. A. Dix (R)	George M. Witter (R)	Whitman County (part)
9th (1905-1906)	G. B. Wilson (R)	Whitman County (part)	E. E. Smith (R)	G. C. Kenoyer (R)	Whitman County (part)
10th (1907-1908)	Peter McGregor (R)	Whitman County (part)	F. P. Connell (R)	G. W. Peddycord (R)	Whitman County (part)
11th (1909-1910)	Peter McGregor (R)	Whitman County (part)	S. J. Boone (R)	H. S. McClure (R)	Whitman County (part)
12th (1911-1912)	Oliver Hall (R)	Whitman County (part)	W. C. McCoy (R)	H. S. McClure (R)	Whitman County (part)
13th (1913-1914)	Oliver Hall (R)	Whitman County (part)	J. E. Turnbow (D)	T. C. Miles (D)	Whitman County (part)
14th (1915-1916)	Oliver Hall (R)	Whitman County (part)	E. W. Wagner (R)	George A. Weldon (R)	Whitman County (part)
15th (1917-1918)	Oliver Hall (R)	Whitman County (part)	George A. Weldon (R)	C. W. McCall (D)	Whitman County (part)
16th (1919-1920)	Oliver Hall (R)	Whitman County (part)	D. F. Trimble (R)	W. M. Anderson (R)	Whitman County (part)
17th (1921-1922)	Oliver Hall (R)	Whitman County (part)	George H. Arland (R)	D. F. Trimble (R)	Whitman County (part)
18th (1923-1924)	Oliver Hall (R)	Whitman County (part)	Harry Goldsworthy (R)	Willis Mahoney (D)	Whitman County (part)
19th (1925-1926)	Oliver Hall (R)	Whitman County (part)	Harry Goldsworthy (R)	Thomas W. Hemp (R)	Whitman County (part)
20th (1927-1928)	Oliver Hall (R)	Whitman County (part)	Harry Goldsworthy (R)	Frank A. Ratliffe (R)	Whitman County (part)
21st (1929-1930)	Oliver Hall (R)	Whitman County (part)	Harry Goldsworthy (R)	Frank A. Ratliffe (R)	Whitman County (part)
22nd (1931-1932)	Oliver Hall (R)	Whitman County (part)	Harry Goldsworthy (R)	Will R. Heglar (R)	Whitman County (part)

=== 1933-Present ===
After the passage of Initiative 57 and the 1930 redistricting cycle, the state senate and state house districts were geographically similar. While some senate districts would occasionally be broken up into house seats A and B, seats A and B were always contained in the Senate district boundaries.

The 8th Legislative district's state senate and house seats are identical geographically from 1933 to the present day.

Year	Senate	House		District Geography
Year	Senator	House Position 1	House Position 2	District Geography
23rd (1933-1934)	W. P. Gray (R)	Richard B. Ott (R)	Grant A. Stewart (R)	Adams, Lincoln, and Ferry Counties
24th (1935-1936)	J. P. Keller (D)	Carl E. Devenish (D)	Richard B. Ott (R)	Adams, Lincoln, and Ferry Counties
25th (1937-1938)	J. P. Keller (D)	Carl E. Devenish (D)	Harry Harder (D)	Adams, Lincoln, and Ferry Counties
26th (1939-1940)	J. P. Keller (D)	Carl E. Devenish (D)	David Phillips (D)	Adams, Lincoln, and Ferry Counties
27th (1941-1942)	J. P. Keller (D)	Carl E. Devenish (D)	David Phillips (D)	Adams, Lincoln, and Ferry Counties
28th (1943-1944)	J. H. Robertson (R) (Note: Resigned Aug. 24, 1949; Appointed Employment Security Commissioner)	David Phillips (D) (Note: Deceased June 24, 1943)	W. C. Raugust (R) (Note: Resigned house seat; Appointed Aug. 25, 1949 to serve the 1950 Ex. Session in the state senate)	Adams, Lincoln, and Ferry Counties
28th (1943-1944)	J. H. Robertson (R)	John Shimek (D) (Note: Appointed Sept. 11, 1943 to serve 1944 Ex. Session)	W. C. Raugust (R)	Adams, Lincoln, and Ferry Counties
29th (1945-1946)	J. H. Robertson (R)	David Hoefel (R)	W. C. Raugust (R)	Adams, Lincoln, and Ferry Counties
30th (1947-1948)	J. H. Robertson (R)	David Hoefel (R)	W. C. Raugust (R)	Adams, Lincoln, and Ferry Counties
31st (1949-1950)	J. H. Robertson (R)	David Hoefel (R)	W. C. Raugust (R)	Adams, Lincoln, and Ferry Counties
31st (1949-1950)	W. C. Raugust (R)	David Hoefel (R)	Clyde Massie (D) (Note: Appointed Aug. 15, 1949)	Adams, Lincoln, and Ferry Counties
32nd (1951-1952)	W. C. Raugust (R)	David Hoefel (R)	Robert D. Timm (R)	Adams, Lincoln, and Ferry Counties
33rd (1953-1954)	W. C. Raugust (R)	David Hoefel (R)	Robert D. Timm (R)	Adams, Lincoln, and Ferry Counties
34th (1955-1956)	W. C. Raugust (R)	Delbert Pence (R)	Robert D. Timm (R)	Adams, Lincoln, and Ferry Counties
35th (1957-1958)	W. C. Raugust (R)	Delbert Pence (R)	Robert D. Timm (R)	Adams, Lincoln, and Ferry Counties
36th (1959-1960)	W. C. Raugust (R)	Donald W. Moos (R)	Position removed in reapportionment	Adams, Lincoln, and Ferry Counties
37th (1961-1962)	W. C. Raugust (R)	Donald W. Moos (R)		Adams, Lincoln, and Ferry Counties
38th (1963-1964)	W. C. Raugust (R)	Donald W. Moos (R)		Adams, Lincoln, and Ferry Counties
39th (1965-1966)	W. C. Raugust (R)	Donald W. Moos (R)		Adams, Lincoln, and Ferry Counties
40th (1967-1968)	Damon Canfield (R)	Irving Newhouse (R)	Position reestablished	1965 Redistricting
40th (1967-1968)	Damon Canfield (R)	Irving Newhouse (R)	Walt Reese (R)	Benton (part) and Yakima (part)
41st (1969-1970)	Damon Canfield (R)	Irving Newhouse (R)	Max E. Benitz (R)	Benton (part) and Yakima (part)
42nd (1971-1972)	Damon Canfield (R)	Irving Newhouse (R)	Max E. Benitz (R)	Benton (part) and Yakima (part)
43rd (1973-1974)	Damon Canfield (R)	Doris Johnson (D)	Max E. Benitz (R)	1972 Redistricting
43rd (1973-1974)	Damon Canfield (R)	Doris Johnson (D)	Max E. Benitz (R)	Benton (part)
44th (1975-1976)	Max E. Benitz (R) (Note: Deceased Aug. 29, 1990)	James M. Boldt (D) (Note: Resigned May 1, 1978)	Claude L. Oliver (R)	Benton (part)
45th (1977-1978)	Max E. Benitz (R)	James M. Boldt (D)	Claude L. Oliver (R)	Benton (part)
45th (1977-1978)	Max E. Benitz (R)	Linda Wynne (D) (Note: Appointed June 8, 1978)	Claude L. Oliver (R)	Benton (part)
45th (1977-1978)	Max E. Benitz (R)	Ray Isaacson (R) (Note: Elected November 1978 to serve unexpired term)	Claude L. Oliver (R)	Benton (part)
46th (1979-1980)	Max E. Benitz (R)	Ray Isaacson (R)	Shirley Hankins (R) (Note: Resigned house seat; Appointed Sept. 19, 1990 to the serve in the state senate)	Benton (part)
47th (1981-1982)	Max E. Benitz (R)	Ray Isaacson (R)	Shirley Hankins (R)	Benton (part)
48th (1983-1984)	Max E. Benitz (R)	Ray Isaacson (R)	Shirley Hankins (R)	Benton (part)
49th (1985-1986)	Max E. Benitz (R)	Ray Isaacson (R)	Shirley Hankins (R)	Benton (part)
50th (1987-1988)	Max E. Benitz (R)	Jim Jesernig (D)	Shirley Hankins (R)	Benton (part)
51st (1989-1990)	Max E. Benitz (R)	Jim Jesernig (D)	Shirley Hankins (R)	Benton (part)
51st (1989-1990)	Shirley Hankins (R)	Jim Jesernig (D)	Vacant (Note: This seat was vacant from Sept. 1990 until the start of the 1991 session. The legislature did not convene during this time.)	Benton (part)
51st (1989-1990)	Jim Jesernig (D) (Note: Elected Nov. 6, 1990; Sworn in Nov. 30, 1990 to serve unexpired term) (Note: Resigned Nov. 9, 1993; Appointed Director of the Washington Department of Agriculture)	Vacant (Note: This seat was vacant from Nov. 30, 1990 until the start of the 1991 session. The legislature did not convene during this time.)	Vacant	Benton (part)
52nd (1991-1992)	Jim Jesernig (D)	Lane Bray (D)	Curtis Ludwig (D) (Note: Resigned house seat; Appointed Dec. 8, 1993 to the serve in the state senate)	Benton (part)
53rd (1993-1994)	Jim Jesernig (D)	Lane Bray (D)	Curtis Ludwig (D)	Benton (part)
53rd (1993-1994)	Curtis Ludwig (D)	Lane Bray (D)	Thomas Moak (D) (Note: Appointed Jan. 3, 1994)	Benton (part)
53rd (1993-1994)	Patricia Hale (R) (Note: Elected Nov. 8, 1994 to serve unexpired term) (Note: Resigned May 6, 2004; Appointed to the U.S. Small Business Administration)	Lane Bray (D)	Jerome Delvin (R) (Note: Elected Nov. 1994 to serve unexpired term)	Benton (part)
54th (1995-1996)	Patricia Hale (R)	Shirley Hankins (R)	Jerome Delvin (R)	Benton (part)
55th (1997-1998)	Patricia Hale (R)	Shirley Hankins (R)	Jerome Delvin (R)	Benton (part)
56th (1999-2000)	Patricia Hale (R)	Shirley Hankins (R)	Jerome Delvin (R)	Benton (part)
57th (2001-2002)	Patricia Hale (R)	Shirley Hankins (R)	Jerome Delvin (R)	Benton (part)
58th (2003-2004)	Patricia Hale (R)	Shirley Hankins (R)	Jerome Delvin (R)	Benton (part)
58th (2003-2004)	Jerome Delvin (R) (Note: Resigned house seat; Appointed May 12, 2004 to the serve in the state senate; Elected Nov. 2, 2004 to serve unexpired term) (Note: Resigned Feb. 3, 2013 Elected to Benton County Council)	Shirley Hankins (R)	Sean McGrath (R) (Note: Appointed May 18, 2004)	Benton (part)
58th (2003-2004)	Jerome Delvin (R)	Shirley Hankins (R)	Larry Haler (R) (Note: Elected Nov. 2004 to serve unexpired term)	Benton (part)
59th (2005-2006)	Jerome Delvin (R)	Shirley Hankins (R)	Larry Haler (R)	Benton (part)
60th (2007-2008)	Jerome Delvin (R)	Shirley Hankins (R)	Larry Haler (R)	Benton (part)
61st (2009-2010)	Jerome Delvin (R)	Brad Klippert (R)	Larry Haler (R)	Benton (part)
62nd (2011-2012)	Jerome Delvin (R)	Brad Klippert (R)	Larry Haler (R)	Benton (part)
63rd (2013-2014)	Jerome Delvin (R)	Brad Klippert (R)	Larry Haler (R)	Benton (part)
63rd (2013-2014)	Sharon Brown (R) (Note: Appointed January 28, 2013; Sworn in Feb. 4. 2013; Elected Nov. 5, 2013 to serve unexpired term)	Brad Klippert (R)	Larry Haler (R)	Benton (part)
64th (2015-2016)	Sharon Brown (R)	Brad Klippert (R)	Larry Haler (R)	Benton (part)
65th (2017-2018)	Sharon Brown (R)	Brad Klippert (R)	Larry Haler (R)	Benton (part)
66th (2019-2020)	Sharon Brown (R)	Brad Klippert (R)	Matt Boehnke (R)	Benton (part)
67th (2021-2022)	Sharon Brown (R)	Brad Klippert (R)	Matt Boehnke (R)	Benton (part)
68th (2023-2024)	Matt Boehnke (R)	Stephanie Barnard (R)	April Connors (R)	Benton (part) and Yakima (part) (Note: 2024 court ordered redistricting in Soto Palmer v. Hobbs)
69th (2025-2026)	Matt Boehnke (R)	Stephanie Barnard (R)	April Connors (R)	Benton (part) and Yakima (part)

== Key ==
Democratic (D)
Populist (Pop)
Republican (R)

- P.P. is People's Party which was closely associate with the Populist Party.

== See also ==
- Washington Redistricting Commission
- Washington State Legislature
- Washington State Senate
- Washington House of Representatives
- Washington (state) legislative districts
