= W. C. Raugust =

American politician

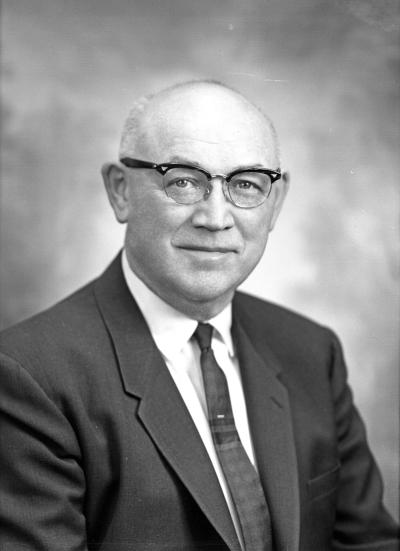
- Raugust in 1965

Member of the Washington Senate from the 8th district
- In office August 15, 1949 – January 9, 1967
- Preceded by: J. H. Robertson
- Succeeded by: Damon R. Canfield

Member of the Washington House of Representatives from the 8th district
- In office January 11, 1943 – August 15, 1949
- Preceded by: Carl E. Devenish
- Succeeded by: Clyde Massie

Personal details
- Born: Wilhelm Christian Raugust; March 13, 1895 Eigenheim, Bessarabia, Russian Empire
- Died: December 17, 1970 (aged 75) Odessa, Washington, U.S.
- Party: Republican

Wilhelm (William) Christian Raugust (March 13, 1895 – December 17, 1970) was an American politician in the state of Washington. He served in the Washington House of Representatives from 1943 to 1949 and in the Senate from 1949 to 1967.
