= Sarah Casada =

American politician

Member of the Washington House of Representatives from the 25th district
- In office January 8, 2001 – January 13, 2003
- Preceded by: Joyce McDonald
- Succeeded by: Joyce McDonald
- In office January 14, 1991 – January 13, 1997
- Preceded by: Don Bennett
- Succeeded by: Joyce McDonald

Member of the Pierce County Council from the 2nd District
- In office January 1, 1997 – January 1, 2001
- Preceded by: William S. "Bill" Stonier
- Succeeded by: Calvin Goings

Personal details
- Born: September 29, 1936 (age 90) Kentucky, U.S.
- Party: Republican
- Spouse: Charles

Sarah Casada (born September 29, 1936) is an American politician who served in the Washington House of Representatives from the 25th district from 1991 to 1997 and from 2001 to 2003.

She was the Republican nominee for Washington's 9th congressional district in 2002; she lost to incumbent Democrat Adam Smith, receiving 38.57% of the vote to Smith's 58.52%.
