= Brad Klippert =

American politician

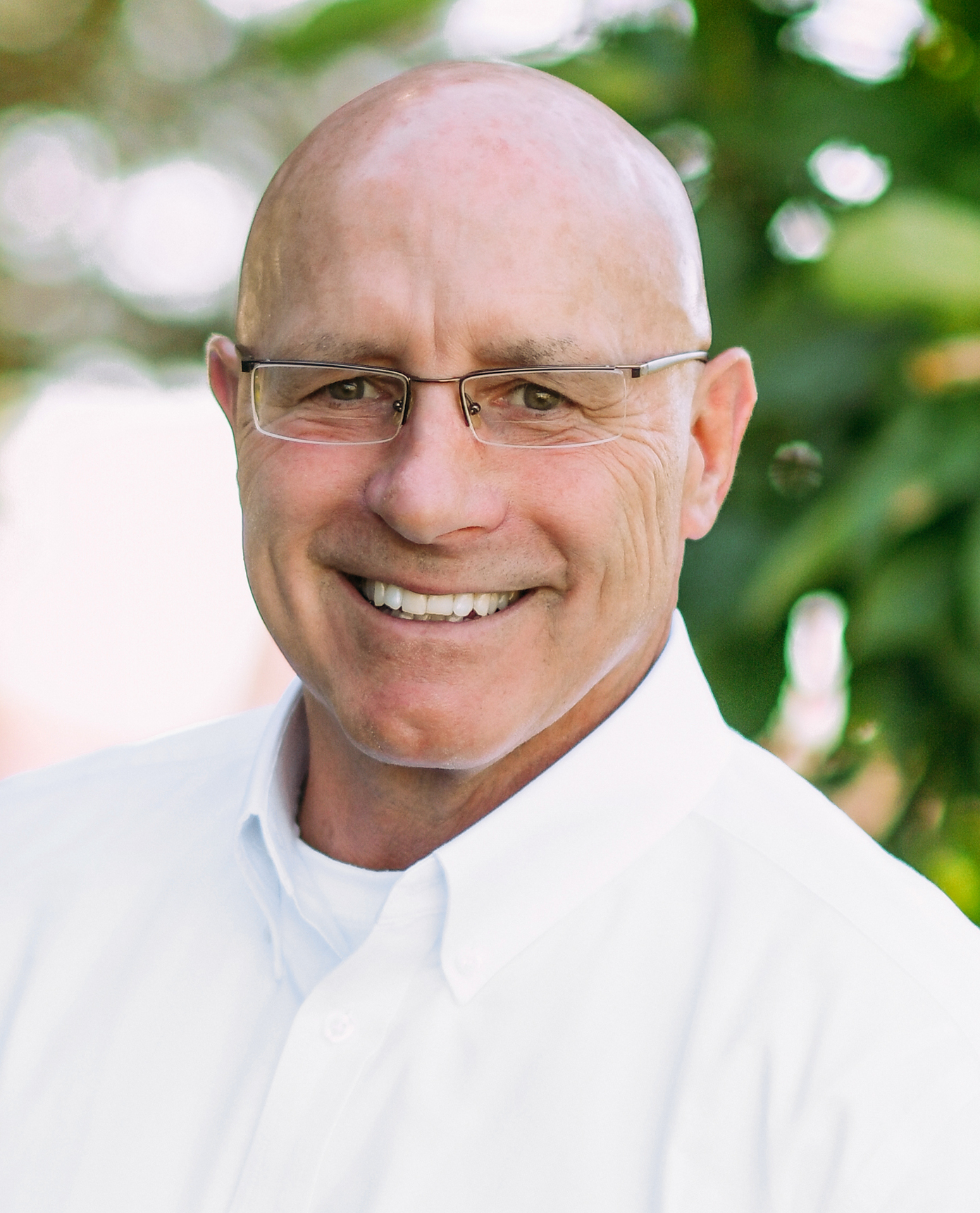

Member of the Washington House of Representatives from the 8th district
- In office January 12, 2009 – January 9, 2023 Serving with Matt Boehnke
- Preceded by: Shirley Hankins
- Succeeded by: Stephanie Barnard

Personal details
- Born: Bradley Allen Klippert; June 27, 1957 (age 69) Sunnyside, Washington, U.S.
- Party: Republican
- Children: 3
- Education: Northwest University (BA); City University of Seattle (MA)
- Website: Official website

Military service
- Allegiance: United States
- Service: Washington Army Natl. Guard; Washington State Guard
- Service years: 1987–2016 (National Guard); 2016–present (State Guard)
- Rank: Lt Colonel (National Guard); Colonel (State Guard)
- Conflicts / operations: Operation Uphold Democracy; Bosnian War; Operation Noble Eagle

Bradley Allen Klippert (born June 27, 1957) is an American politician, minister, law enforcement officer, and military officer who formerly served as a member of the Washington House of Representatives from the 8th Legislative District.

== Career ==
Klippert is a Pentecostal minister and a sheriff's deputy for the Benton County sheriff's department, serving as a school officer during legislative sessions and a patrol officer at other times. Klippert was a member of the United States Army Reserve in 1987 and retired from the Army National Guard as a lieutenant colonel in May 2016. In August 2016, Klippert was appointed as the commander of the Washington State Guard, a position that he was directed to retire from in December, 2021.

Klippert was elected to the Washington House of Representatives in 2008 and was re-elected that year and again in 2010. He is currently an Assistant Minority Whip.

In January 2021, Klippert proposed legislation (House Bill 1377) that would end voting by mail in Washington state, stating that he has a "reasonable suspicion" that voter fraud using the system is widespread. The bill didn't pass through the House committee by the February deadline. Klippert stated he would continue to attempt to end the state's voting by mail system.

In August 2021, Klippert visited South Dakota to attend a symposium organized by MyPillow CEO Mike Lindell, known for actively promoting false claims of fraud in the 2020 presidential election. Klippert and other state Republican lawmakers joined in announcing the creation of an “election integrity caucus” seeking to conduct audits similar to the controversial Arizona audit in all states. He was one of three Washington legislators to attend the event using reimbursed funds from the state legislature's annual travel allotment for events "connected to their legislative work".

In November 2021, Klippert and 2 other Washington state Republican lawmakers signed a letter calling the 2020 election "corrupted" and demanded that an audit similar to the Arizona one be conducted in all states. The letter also requested the decertification of state electors from 2020 and falsely claimed that the Arizona audit found evidence of fraud.

In order to run for Congress, Klippert could not seek re-election for his legislative seat. Preliminary results from the August 2 non-partisan primary indicate that Stephanie Barnard and Patrick Guettner, both Republicans, will compete to succeed him in the November general election.

== Elections ==
=== 2004 U.S. Senate election ===
Klippert ran for the Republican nomination for the U.S. Senate seat of Patty Murray. He lost the primary to U.S. Representative George Nethercutt 432,748–29,870. Murray was re-elected at the general election.

=== 2006 U.S. Senate election ===
Klippert ran in the Republican primary against former insurance corporation CEO Mike McGavick for the Senate seat held by Democrat Maria Cantwell. He came in distant second place, with seven percent of the vote against McGavick's 85 percent. Cantwell went on to win the general election.

=== 2022 U.S. House election ===
Following Representative Dan Newhouse's vote to impeach President Donald Trump, Klippert announced his candidacy to challenge Newhouse in Washington's 4th congressional district. He lost in the primary, placing 5th among a field of 8 candidates.

=== 2024 Washington Superintendent of Public Education ===
On April 15, 2023, Klippert registered with the Washington State Public Disclosure Commission a campaign for Washington State Superintendent of Public Instruction in 2024. He had pledged to withdraw if not endorsed by the Washington State Republican Party at the convention, and did so after the party endorsed Peninsula School District board member David Olson.

== Awards ==
- 2014 Guardians of Small Business award. Presented by NFIB.
- 2020 Guardians of Small Business. Presented by NFIB.
