= Pat Hale =

American politician (1937–2025)

Member of the Washington Senate from the 8th district
- In office November 1994 – May 2004
- Preceded by: Curtis Ludwig
- Succeeded by: Jerome Delvin

Personal details
- Born: January 9, 1937 Durham, North Carolina
- Died: September 26, 2025 (aged 88)
- Party: Republican
- Occupation: Politician

Patricia S. Hale (January 9, 1937 – September 26, 2025) was an American politician of the Republican Party.

Hale was born in Durham, North Carolina. She studied marketing at the University of North Carolina and economics at the University of Richmond. She moved from her home state in 1983 to the Tri-Cities, Washington, area to work for Hanford, which later became Fluor and Westinghouse Hanford.

She was a member of the Washington State Senate, representing the 8th district from 1994 to 2004. While in office, she served as Republican Caucus Chair from 1999–2003 and the Majority Whip in 1997–1998.

In 2004, she resigned to serve on the National Advisory Council for the Small Business Administration.

Hale died on September 26, 2025, at the age of 88.
