= Ed Heavey =

American lawyer and politician (1928–2019)

Member of the King County Council from the 8th district
- In office May 1, 1969 – January 1, 1976
- Preceded by: Constituency established
- Succeeded by: Bob Greive

Member of the Washington House of Representatives from the 31st district
- In office January 13, 1967 – May 12, 1969
- Preceded by: Wayne G. Angevine
- Succeeded by: Norman B. Ackley

Personal details
- Born: October 13, 1928
- Died: September 27, 2019 (aged 90) Seattle, Washington, U.S.
- Party: Democratic

Edward Heavey (October 13, 1928 – September 27, 2019) was an American lawyer and politician who served as a member of the King County Council, representing the 8th district from 1969 to 1976. A member of the Democratic Party, he previously served as a member of the Washington House of Representatives, representing the 31st district from 1967 to 1969.
