= April Connors =

American politician

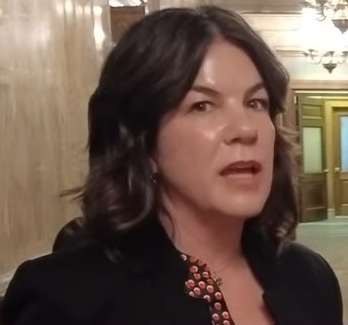
- Connors in 2024

Member of the Washington House of Representatives from the 8th district
- Incumbent
- Assumed office January 9, 2023 Serving with Stephanie Barnard
- Preceded by: Matt Boehnke

Personal details
- Party: Republican
- Education: Washington State University (BA)
- Profession: Real estate broker
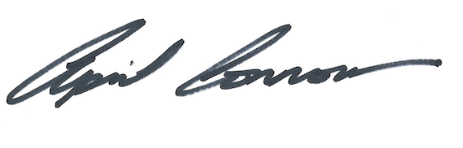
- Signature

April Connors is an American politician who has served as a Republican member of the Washington House of Representatives from the 8th district since 2023.
