= Calvin Goings =

American politician

Member of the Pierce County Council from the 2nd District
- In office January 1, 2001 – January 1, 2009
- Preceded by: Sarah Casada
- Succeeded by: Joyce McDonald

Member of the Washington Senate from the 25th district
- In office December 20, 1995 – January 8, 2001
- Preceded by: Marcus Gaspard
- Succeeded by: Jim Kastama

Personal details
- Born: April 3, 1973 (age 53) Puyallup, Washington, U.S.
- Party: Democratic
- Spouse: David Ham
- Children: 1
- Education: Pacific Lutheran University (BA)

Calvin W. Goings (born April 3, 1973) is the Assistant City Manager for the City of Port Angeles. He was the Director of Finance and Administrative Services for the City of Seattle, and a former politician. He was the youngest member to ever serve in the Washington State Legislature representing Puyallup at 22 years old.

Goings also served for over seven years as a member of President Obama's economic development team leading the U.S. Small Business Administration (SBA) in the Pacific Northwest, where he focused on expanding SBA support to small businesses owned by women, immigrants and minorities.

== Life and education ==
Calvin Goings grew up in Puyallup, Washington, as the youngest of four children and attended Franklin Pierce High School.

He earned his undergraduate degree from Pacific Lutheran University in Tacoma, Washington.

== Elected official ==
At 18, Goings ran for Fire Commissioner of Central Pierce Fire and Rescue and became one of the state's youngest elected officials. In 1995, at age 22, he was appointed to the Washington State Senate and was the youngest State Senator in the nation at that time. The following year Goings was elected outright to continue in that office. Goings Represented the 25th Legislative District. He was named to fill the vacancy left when Senate Majority Leader Marc Gaspard resigned. He served as Vice Chair of the Senate Transportation Committee.

In 2000, Goings was elected to the Pierce County Council. He was also a gubernatorial appointee to the State Transportation Improvement Board (TIB). During his time on the Pierce County Council he was the prime sponsor of the first domestic partner benefits equity legislation for Pierce County employees.

In 2008, Goings ran for Pierce County Executive but lost to Pat McCarthy.

== Professional career ==
In 2010, Goings was appointed by President Obama to serve as Regional Administrator of Region X (Pacific NW Region) of the U.S. Small Business Administration. He served for seven years in this role as a member of Obama's economic development team.

Goings served as the Director of Finance and Administrative Services for the City of Seattle. In this role, Goings served as a member of Mayor Bruce Harrell's Cabinet.

He also served as the CEO of the largest civilian led mass vaccination site in the United States. Under his leadership, the site provided over 102,000 life-saving vaccinations.

Previously, Goings was the Chief of Staff for Seattle City Light.

In the private sector, Goings led the statewide Washington Credit Union Foundation.

Outside of work, Goings served as a past member of the board of directors for the Greater Seattle Business Association, the nation's largest LGBTQ chamber of commerce.

== Personal life ==
Goings lives on the Olympic Peninsula.
