= Joyce McDonald =

American politician from Washington

Member of the Washington House of Representatives from the 25th district
- In office January 9, 2017 – January 14, 2019
- Preceded by: Hans Zeiger
- Succeeded by: Chris Gildon
- In office January 13, 2003 – January 12, 2009
- Preceded by: Sarah Casada
- Succeeded by: Bruce Dammeier
- In office January 13, 1997 – January 8, 2001
- Preceded by: Sarah Casada
- Succeeded by: Sarah Casada

Member of the Pierce County Council from the 2nd District
- In office January 1, 2009 – January 3, 2017
- Preceded by: Calvin Goings
- Succeeded by: Pam Roach

Personal details
- Born: December 14, 1952 (age 73) Scotland, United Kingdom
- Party: Republican
- Spouse: Gary McDonald
- Children: 4

Joyce McDonald (born December 14, 1952) is an American politician from the state of Washington. A member of the Republican Party, McDonald served as a councilor for Pierce County, Washington from 2009 to 2016. She served in the Washington House of Representatives, representing the 25th district, from 1997 to 2001, 2003–2008, 2017–2018.

McDonald is from Puyallup, Washington. She ran for Pierce County Councilor in 2008, and won. She ran for reelection in 2012. She ran against incumbent Denny Heck for the United States House of Representatives in Washington's 10th congressional district in the 2014 elections, losing by 9 points.
