= Bob Greive =

American politician

R. R. "Bob" Greive
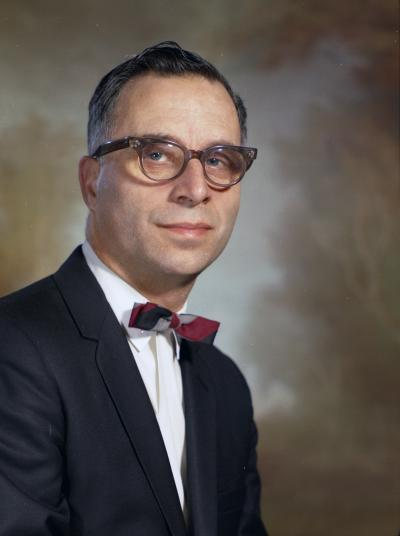
- Greive in 1967

Member of the King County Council from the 8th district
- In office January 1, 1976 – January 1, 1988
- Preceded by: Ed Heavey
- Succeeded by: Greg Nickels

Member of the Washington Senate from the 34th district
- In office January 13, 1947 – January 13, 1975
- Preceded by: Paul G. Thomas
- Succeeded by: Nancy R. Buffington

Personal details
- Born: Raymond Robert Greive; October 6, 1919 Seattle, Washington, U.S.
- Died: July 1, 2004 (aged 84) Seattle, Washington, U.S.
- Party: Democratic

Raymond Robert Greive, known as Bob, (October 6, 1919 – July 1, 2004) was an American politician in the state of Washington. He served in the Washington State Senate from 1947 to 1975.

== Early life ==
Greive was born on October 6, 1919, in West Seattle, Washington. His father was a shipyard worker who became the owner of a salvage company and his mother was a Canadian immigrant who was active in the Democratic Party. He had one sister, Alberta. He attended a number of Catholic elementary schools and O'Dea High School, where his dyslexia caused him difficulty with reading and math but where he achieved better results in art and debate. In 1938, he graduated from West Seattle High School, where he had transferred in his senior year to take art courses. He completed one year of post-graduate work at the high school.

He studied commercial art at the Cornish School and was a skilled illustrator and cartoonist, but when the United States entered World War II in 1941, he joined the Coast Guard. He illustrated the Coast Guard’s publications from his station in Puget Sound. After the war ended, he left his brief career in graphic design to attend law school, first at Seattle University and later at the University of Washington. He married Barbara Shea and the couple had six children before ultimately divorcing after 37 years of marriage. A practising Catholic, he attended mass at Holy Rosary Church religiously.

== Political career ==
=== Washington State Senate ===
Greive first ran for the Washington State Senate in 1946. He was diligent about his campaign, designing his own campaign advertisements and campaigning door to door. Aged 27, he campaigned on the argument that his incumbent was out of touch and that he would bring "the vigor and energy of youth". After his election, he earned the nickname "Rule Book Greive" for memorizing Robert's Rules of Order. He was still a law student at the time, although he ultimately failed out, an event that he blamed on the university’s opposition to his proposed legislation to shorten the length of the law school course from four years to three. He received his law degree in 1951 after briefly attending classes at the University of Idaho before ultimately graduating from the University of Miami. He worked as a lawyer throughout his life, primarily focused on personal injury work.

During Greive's first year in the Senate, Representative Albert F. Canwell introduced a resolution to create the Joint Legislative Fact-finding Committee on Un-American Activities in the State of Washington, which would investigate Communism in the state government. Greive was one of twelve senators to oppose the resolution. Throughout his time in the legislature, he supported organized labor and environmental issues, helping to create the Municipality of Metropolitan Seattle in 1958 and the Washington State Department of Ecology. He was also focused on affordable housing and supported laws to limit air pollution.

In 1956, Greive was chosen by the Democratic caucus to replace Albert D. Rosellini as the Senate majority leader, a position that he would hold for the next 12 years. He used this position to fundraise for various other politicians by soliciting donations from lobbyists and adding them to what was called the "Greive Fund". Shortly after he became the majority leader, the legislature was forced by the League of Women Voters and the courts to redistrict for the first time since 1930. He was involved in three rounds of restricting, between 1956 and 1957, 1962 and 1964 and 1971 and 1974, when he used the process to protect his allies. Martin Durkan claimed that Greive redistricted him away from his district on each occasion.

Greive was removed as majority leader on November 2, 1972, being replaced with August Mardesich, following conflict over his approach to redistricting. He subsequently alleged that Mardesich had accepted a $20,000 bribe and although his fellow legislator was ultimately acquitted, he had to resign his position as majority leader. Two years later, Greive faced his own investigation following a complaint filed by his former aid, which alleged that Greive had asked him to do private legal work and collect information on his political enemies while on the Senate payroll. The Senate Ethics Committee did not find a violation of any rules of conduct but in the 1974 election, Republican Nancy Buffington beat Greive by 542 votes.

=== King County Council ===
Greive ran for a position on the King County Council for the 8th district in 1975, challenging Democratic incumbent Ed Heavey. He was focused on his district, working with Ron Sims to fill potholes, create bus stops and obtain funding for the West Seattle Bridge. During his time on the council, it was split with five Democrats and four Republicans and Greive was often the swing vote, sometimes siding with Republicans and other times with Democrats. He was re-elected twice with no challengers but in the 1987 Democratic primary, he lost to Greg Nickels.

== Later life ==
Following his retirement from politics, Greive received a Ph.D. in political science from Claremont Graduate University in 1991, writing a dissertation titled The Blood, Sweat, and Tears of Political Victory…and Defeat which he self published in 1996. He continued his law practice until 2002. He died from complications arising from Parkinson's disease on July 1, 2004, in West Seattle.
