= Marcus Gaspard =

American politician

Majority Leader of the Washington Senate
- In office January 11, 1993 – January 13, 1997
- Preceded by: Jeannette Hayner
- Succeeded by: Dan McDonald

Minority Leader of the Washington Senate
- In office January 14, 1991 – January 11, 1993
- Preceded by: Larry Vognild
- Succeeded by: George L. Sellar

Member of the Washington Senate from the 25th district
- In office January 10, 1977 – December 1, 1995
- Preceded by: Reuben Knoblauch
- Succeeded by: Calvin Goings

Member of the Washington House of Representatives from the 25th district
- In office January 8, 1973 – January 10, 1977
- Preceded by: Leonard A. Sawyer
- Succeeded by: Dan Grimm

Personal details
- Born: 1948 (age 77–78) Tacoma, Washington, U.S.
- Party: Democratic

Marcus S. Gaspard (born 1948) is an American former politician in the state of Washington. He served in the Washington House of Representatives from 1973 to 1977 and in the Senate from 1977 to 1995.
