= Lane Bray =

American politician from Washington State (1928–2015)

Member of the Washington House of Representatives from the 8th Position 1 district
- In office January 14, 1991 – January 9, 1995
- Preceded by: Jim Jesernig
- Succeeded by: Shirley Hankins

Personal details
- Born: September 21, 1928 Highland Park, Illinois, U.S.
- Died: September 9, 2015 (aged 86) Richland, Washington, U.S.
- Party: Democratic
- Occupation: research scientist, chemist

Lance Allen "Lane" Bray (September 21, 1928 – September 9, 2015) was an American politician in the state of Washington. He served the 8th district from 1991 to 1995. He attended Lake Forest College and was a research scientist and chemist. He was also a former mayor of Richland, Washington. Bray died in Richland, Washington.
