= Shirley Hankins =

American politician from Washington (1931–2025)

Member of the Washington House of Representatives from the 8th Position 1 district
- In office January 9, 1995 – January 12, 2009
- Preceded by: Lane Bray
- Succeeded by: Brad Klippert

Member of the Washington Senate from the 8th district
- In office September 19, 1990 – November 30, 1990
- Preceded by: Max Benitz Sr.
- Succeeded by: Jim Jesernig

Member of the Washington House of Representatives from the 8th Position 2 district
- In office January 12, 1981 – September 19, 1990
- Preceded by: Claude Oliver
- Succeeded by: Curtis Ludwig

Personal details
- Born: November 9, 1931 Colby, Kansas, U.S.
- Died: January 20, 2025 (aged 93)
- Party: Republican

Shirley Hankins (November 9, 1931 – January 20, 2025) was an American politician who served in the Washington House of Representatives from the 8th district from 1981 to 1990 and from 1995 to 2009 and in the Washington State Senate from the 8th district in 1990. She died on January 20, 2025, at the age of 93.
