= Jim Jesernig =

American politician from Washington

Member of the Washington Senate from the 8th district
- In office 1991–1993
- Preceded by: Shirley Hankins
- Succeeded by: Curtis Ludwig

Member of the Washington House of Representatives from the 8th district
- In office 1987–1991 Serving with Shirley Hankins
- Preceded by: Ray Isaacson
- Succeeded by: Lane Bray

Personal details
- Born: Kennewick, Washington
- Party: Democratic
- Occupation: Politician

Jim Jesernig is an American politician of the Democratic Party. He was a member of the Washington State Senate, representing the 8th district from 1991 to 1993. He also served in the Washington House of Representatives from 1987-1991.

He ran for the United States House of Representatives in 1992, losing in the blanket primary to Jay Inslee, the eventual winner, 23–22.

Jesernig served from 1993 to 2001 as the director of the Washington State Department of Agriculture, succeeding Peter J. Goldmark.

Jesernig competed in the hammer at Washington State University and in 1979 was ranked in the top five throwers in the United States.
