= Linda Wynne =

Washington State politician

Member of the Washington House of Representatives from the 8th district
- In office June 8, 1978 – January 7, 1979A
- Preceded by: James Boldt
- Succeeded by: Ray Isaacson

Personal details
- Party: Democratic

Linda Wynne is a former American politician who served as a member of the Washington House of Representatives from her appointment on June 8, 1978, until after she lost the next general election to Republican Ray Isaacson. She represented Washington's 8th legislative district as a Democrat.
