= Gavin Seim =

Libertarian activist

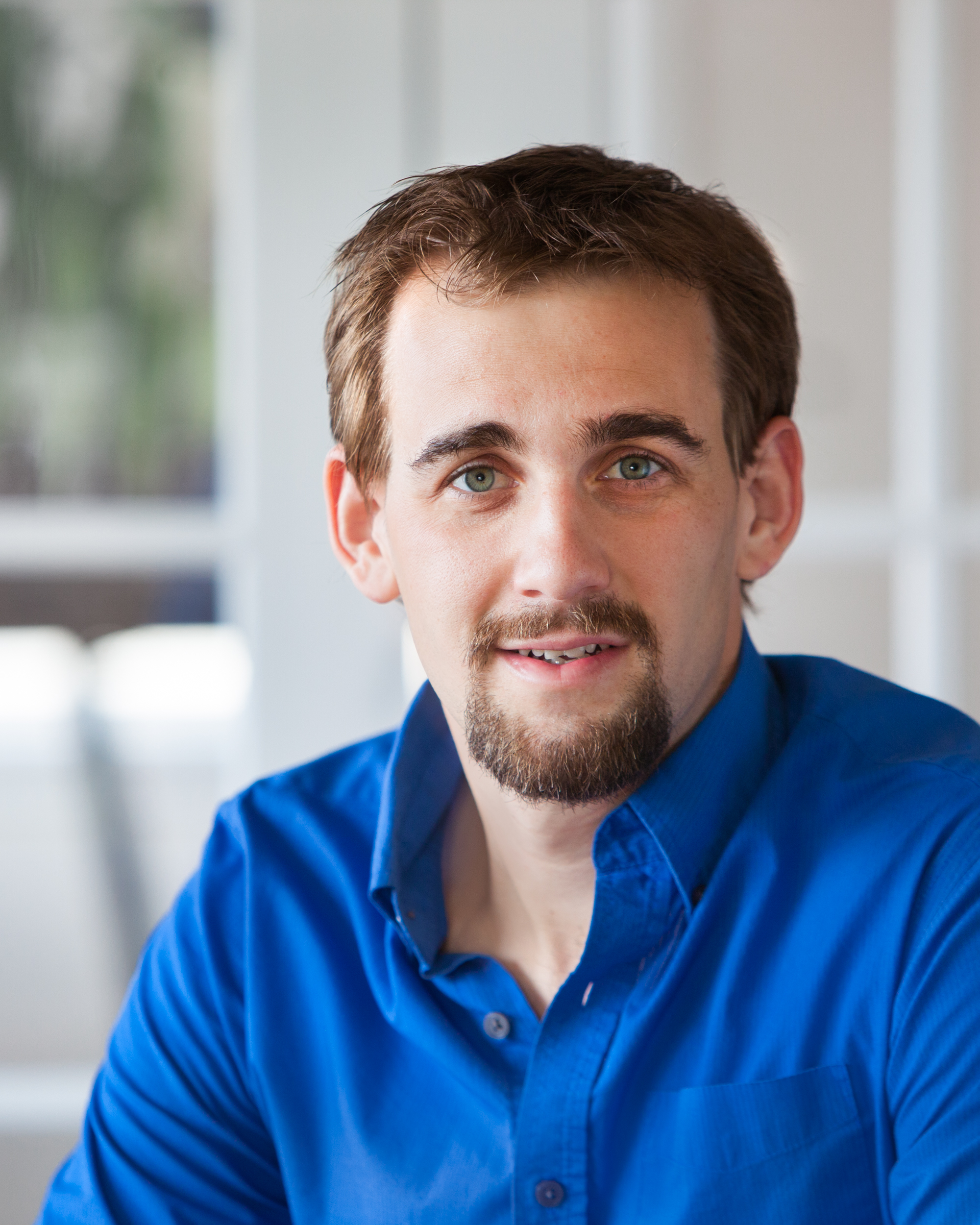
- Seim in 2014
- Born: January 17, 1985 (age 41); Ephrata, Washington, United States
- Occupations: Photographer, activist, independent filmmaker
- Political party: Libertarian, Republican
- Movement: Libertarian
- Spouse: Sondra Seim (m. 2007)
- Website: Official website

Gavin David Seim (born January 17, 1985, in Ephrata, Washington) is an American activist, self-described constitutionalist, conspiracy theorist, filmmaker and photographer, known for using confrontational sovereign citizen tactics against law enforcement. He posted a viral, controversial video on the internet, entitled "Citizen Pulls Cop Over." He also organized an "I Will NOT Comply" rally and posted a video about the same subject.

In 2014, he ran, unsuccessfully, for the United States House of Representatives as a Republican. He placed eighth in the open primary, obtaining approximately two percent of the votes cast.

In 2015, he was arrested for interfering with a court, assault on a police officer, disorderly conduct, and contempt of court.

On December 8, 2017, he failed to appear in Grant County District Court on charges of obstruction of a law enforcement officer and harassment in connection with an August 2017 arrest in Ephrata, Washington. Seim claimed illegal conduct from the court and prosecutor, including a motion which would force him to unlock his phone and said that he refused to comply. A warrant with a $5,000 bond was issued for his arrest. According to press reports, Seim has fled to Mexico. He continues to post videos refusing to abide by Mexican police checkpoints, demanding they speak English, and provides dangerous "advice" on how to confront police during routine stops.

On February 13, 2020, Gavin Seim claimed that the Mexican government gave him and his family protected person status and permanent residency.

== Political views ==
=== Second Amendment ===
During a protest in Spokane, Washington, in 2014, Seim stated, "The people should be armed equal to the police. If they can have an MRAP [mine-resistant, ambush-protected vehicle], we can have a tank."

=== Abortion ===
Seim is against abortion and believes that life begins at conception; he also believes that the "right to life" lies at the very core of both liberty and the Constitution.

=== Foreign policy ===
The US ambassador in Mexico has called Seim a "spoiled brat" and a perfect example of the "Ugly American" regarding Seim's opinions on which laws to obey in Mexico.

=== Pandemic conspiracies ===
Seim believes COVID-19 is nothing more than a common cold and lockdown measures are unconstitutional. After obtaining refugee status, Seim continued to practice civil disobedience, refusing to wear locally mandated masks when required and challenging local Mexican authorities

== 2014 election ==
In 2014, Seim ran for the U.S. House of Representatives, to represent Washington state's 4th Congressional District. He ran as a Republican, using the slogan, "No More Politicians". Seim lost in the primary, receiving 2.56% of the vote, which was 1,462 of the 73,264 votes counted. $7,676.00 was donated to his campaign in total.

== "I Will NOT Comply" rally ==
Seim organized an "I Will NOT Comply" rally which took place in December 2014 in Olympia. The rally was in protest of Washington State Initiative 594, which had recently passed by a 19-point margin and expanded gun sale background checks to private sales and exchanges.

Seim refused to obtain a permit for the rally, but notified the government of his intent to hold the rally. In response, the government informed him that another pro-gun group was planning a rally for the same day in the same location. Seim responded that he was only informing them of his plans, not asking for authorization.

He intended for the rally to be a civil disobedience event. However, a spokesman for the Washington State Patrol stated that openly exchanging guns as the rally intended would not be illegal, since handing a gun to another person would not be considered a "transfer" within the meaning of i594.

Seim spoke at the event, arguing that mass shooting events were caused by gun regulation. While on stage, Seim burned his state concealed weapons permit and said that those who want tanks and bazookas should purchase them.

Ammon Bundy, who had participated in the Bundy standoff (which arose from a dispute between Bundy's father and the United States Bureau of Land Management), was scheduled to speak at the event, but refused to show up.

== 2015 arrest ==
In 2015, Seim attended the hearing of 19-year-old Tavis Shasteen, who was cited for refusing to provide a driver's license to a police officer when stopped for speeding. Seim insisted on representing Shasteen, but the court would not allow it, since Seim was not an attorney. The court also would not allow him to live-stream the hearing. Seim was subsequently arrested.

Seim was booked into jail for interfering with a court, disorderly conduct, and contempt of court. He was sentenced to 14 days house arrest and 12 months probation.

== Ties to the Bundy standoff and the occupation of MNWR ==
Ammon Bundy participated in the Bundy standoff in 2014 and led armed militants in the occupation of the Malheur National Wildlife Refuge in 2016. Bundy was scheduled to speak at the "I Will NOT Comply" event that Seim organized in 2014, but Bundy did not show up.

At the end of the MNWR occupation in early 2016, Seim hosted live streams of the remaining four occupiers. David Fry, the last remaining occupier, called Seim, who streamed the audio over the internet. Seim urged Fry to peacefully leave the refuge. He also made various videos supporting those arrested. Additionally, he became an editor of the official Bundy Ranch Facebook page.

=== Alleged donation misuse ===
Seim posted links on his website to numerous fundraiser pages for those arrested for participating in the 2014 Bundy standoff and/or the 2016 MNWR Occupation. In addition he urged donations he claims to have used for educational and direct support for jailed defendants. Petitions have been made demanding full accounting of how the funds were spent as donors suspected that money was used in Seim's own personal interests including drone and RV accessories.

== 2017 arrests ==
On August 17, 2017, Seim was arrested following an altercation with a police officer at the Ephrata Walmart. Seim was charged with harassing and obstructing a police officer. Shortly after being arrested Seim posted a Facebook Live video in which he claimed that the police officer was "harassing some woman in her pickup truck" and "trying to be cool", so he started to record the stop. While being arrested, a police officer seized Seim's phone.

Seim was released from Grant County Jail after posting a $2,000 bond.

In October 2017, Seim appeared at Grant County District Court regarding the case. He notified the court of his intent to represent himself in all future court proceedings. During the hearing Seim contended that the phone seized during his arrest was taken without a warrant. Seim argued that he was legally allowed to film the police officer as he was on a traffic stop. Deputy Prosecutor Marc Fedorak explained that a warrant had been obtained to conduct a search of the phone, but efforts to search the phone had been unsuccessful because the device was password-protected.

Judge Mark A. Chmelewski denied Seim's motion to have his phone returned, after finding that "the phone was properly seized", but ordered the state to return the phone to Seim within 21 days.

In November 2017, Seim posted a video to his YouTube page explaining that he had chosen not to appear in court because he feared that doing so risked his family's lives. Several days later, Seim posted another video from Mexico. This showed his family leaving Ephrata and crossing the border into Mexico. Seim defended his decision to travel to Mexico, arguing that "I didn't run from law or justice. Prosecutor Marc [Fedorak] has nothing to do with either one and neither does the judge and neither does Grant County, neither does my sheriff. I'm not hiding. I'm changing the narrative."

In December 2017, at the request of Deputy Prosecutor Marc Fedorak, Judge Chmelewski issued a $5,000 bench warrant for Seim's arrest after he failed to appear at a court hearing held on December 8, 2017. Fedorak told the court that the State intended to dismiss the harassment charge previously brought against Seim, but would file at least one bail jumping charge against Seim. Fedorak said Seim appeared to be living in an "alternate universe" and called Seim's actions "silly" and "very unfortunate".
