= Sharon Brown (politician) =

American lawyer and politician

Member of the Washington Senate from the 8th district
- In office February 4, 2013 – January 9, 2023
- Preceded by: Jerome Delvin
- Succeeded by: Matt Boehnke

Personal details
- Born: 1962 (age 63–64) Albany, New York, U.S.
- Party: Republican
- Spouse: Divorced
- Education: Drew University, University of New Hampshire School of Law
- Occupation: lawyer, politician
- Website: Official website

Sharon Raye Brown (born 1962) is an American lawyer and politician of the Republican Party. She was a member of the Washington State Senate from Washington's 8th Legislative District. Brown was appointed to fill the Senate seat on February 4, 2013, following Senator Jerome Delvin's leaving to become Benton County Commissioner in January 2013.

== Awards ==
- 2014 Guardians of Small Business award. Presented by NFIB.
- 2020 Guardians of Small Business. Presented by NFIB.
- 2021 City Champion Awards. Presented by Association of Washington Cities (AWC).

== Election history ==
Washington's 8th legislative district senate election, 2018
Year	Republican	Votes	Pct	Democrat	Votes	Pct
2018	Sharon Brown	39,960	67.55%	Leo Perales	19,194	32.45%
