= Damon Canfield =

American politician

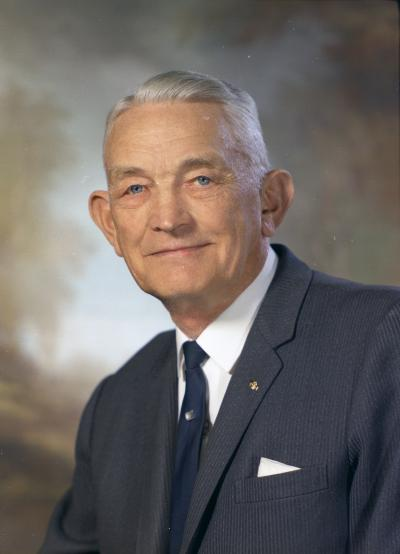
- Canfield in 1969

Member of the Washington Senate from the 8th district
- In office January 9, 1967 – January 13, 1975
- Preceded by: Wilhelm C. Raugust
- Succeeded by: Max E. Benitz

Member of the Washington House of Representatives from the 15th district
- In office January 12, 1953 – January 9, 1967
- Preceded by: Alfred S. Hillyer
- Succeeded by: Sidney W. Morrison

Personal details
- Born: Damon Revelle Canfield; September 21, 1897 Siloam Springs, Arkansas, U.S.
- Died: August 14, 1992 (aged 94) Bothell, Washington, U.S.
- Party: Republican

Damon Revelle Canfield (September 21, 1897 – August 14, 1992) was an American politician in the state of Washington. He served in the Washington House of Representatives from 1953 to 1967 and in the Senate from 1967 to 1975.
