= August P. Mardesich =

American politician

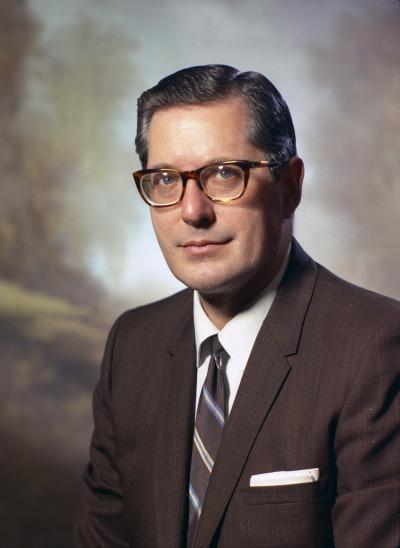
- Mardesich in 1969

Majority Leader of the Washington Senate
- In office January 8, 1973 – January 10, 1977
- Preceded by: Bob Greive
- Succeeded by: Gordon Walgren

Member of the Washington Senate from the 38th district
- In office January 14, 1963 – January 8, 1979
- Preceded by: Howard S. Bargreen
- Succeeded by: Larry Vognild

Member of the Washington House of Representatives from the 38th district
- In office February 9, 1950 – January 14, 1963
- Preceded by: Tony P. Mardesich
- Succeeded by: Jack Metcalf

Personal details
- Born: August Paul Mardesich; February 11, 1920 San Pedro, California, U.S.
- Died: February 8, 2016 (aged 95) Mill Creek, Washington, U.S.
- Party: Democratic
- Spouse: Rosemary Mardesich
- Profession: fisherman, businessman, lawyer

August Paul Mardesich (February 11, 1920 – February 8, 2016) was an American politician in the state of Washington.

== Early life ==
Mardesich was born in San Pedro, California, to Nicola "Nick" and Mary (née Felando) Mardesich, two Croatian immigrants. His father was an avid fisherman, originating from the island of Vis. After the family relocated to Everett, Washington, in 1928, Mardesich attended schooling in that same city, and later Seattle University, along with his brother, Tony. After serving in the United States Army during World War II, Mardesich attended the University of Washington Law School, graduating in 1948 and admitted to the bar. The following year, when the Mardesich family was on a fishing trip to the Bering Sea, their boat capsized, and amongst five crew members, his father, and brother Tony, who had recently been elected to the Washington House of Representatives, were lost at sea. August Mardesich survived the ordeal and would later be appointed to fill his brother's unfilled House term. He would later run the family's fishing business.

== Legislative career ==
Mardesich served in the Washington House of Representatives for District 38 (parts of Snohomish County) from 1950 to 1963, as a Democrat. He served as majority leader in the 1950s, during his third term. In 1962, he ran for election to the Washington State Senate for the same district, on the premise of the four-year terms that it offered, rather than the two-year terms that the house offered. In 1972, he became majority leader, replacing Senator Bob Greive, who had previously held the position for 16 years.

In 1975, he was indicted by a grand jury on charges of extortion and tax evasion, charges he was later to be found innocent of, on July 3, 1975. Later in 1975, he was sued by Attorney General Slade Gorton on charges of influence peddling and violating public disclosure laws regarding payments between Mardesich and two banks. He resigned as majority leader later that year. Three years later, in 1978, he lost re-election to the state senate, effectively ending his political career. He would later attempt to win re-election to his old senate seat held by Larry Vognild, but was defeated in the primary.

Later, he served on the Industrial Insurance Appeals Board, appointed by Governor Dixy Lee Ray, and also worked as a lobbyist. Though he had survived another fishing accident when a boat with him and his daughters capsized in Alaska, in 1976, he also returned to fishing.

During his legislative service, Mardesich was regarded for his ability to simplify and explain confusing bills and pieces of legislation. He was also widely regarded as one of the most powerful persons in the state. He was married to Rosemary and with her had six children. He was still remembered as one of the most influential legislators the political history of the state. Mardesich died on February 8, 2016, in Mill Creek, Washington.
