= Jerome Delvin =

American politician from Washington

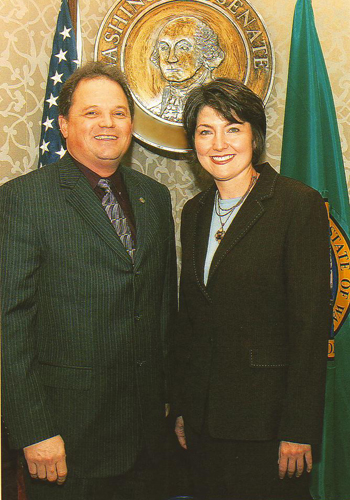
- Jerome Delvin with Congresswoman Cathy McMorris Rodgers in 2006

Benton County Commissioner
- Incumbent
- Assumed office January 1, 2013
- Preceded by: Leo Bowman

Member of the Washington House of Representatives from the 8th district
- In office January 3, 1995 – January 10, 2005
- Preceded by: Curtis Ludwig
- Succeeded by: Larry Haler

Member of the Washington Senate from the 8th district
- In office January 3, 2005 – February 4, 2013
- Preceded by: Pat Hale
- Succeeded by: Sharon Brown

Personal details
- Born: Richland, Washington
- Occupation: Politician

Jerome L Delvin II (born September 15, 1956) is an American politician of the Republican Party. He was a member of the Washington State Senate, representing District 8 from his appointment in 2004, serving the 8th district until February 4, 2013, when he left to become Benton County Commissioner in January 2013.
