= Larry Haler =

American politician from Washington

Member of the Washington House of Representatives from the 8th district
- In office November 2, 2004 – January 14, 2019
- Preceded by: Sean McGrath
- Succeeded by: Matt Boehnke

Personal details
- Born: Lawrence Eugene Haler; January 24, 1951 (age 75) Iowa City, Iowa, U.S.
- Party: Republican
- Spouse: Jenifer Lea (Leitz) Haler
- Education: Pacific Lutheran University (BA); City University (MBA)
- Profession: Nuclear engineer Training specialist Program manager
- Website: Official

Lawrence Eugene Haler (born January 24, 1951) is an American politician of the Republican Party. He was a member of the Washington House of Representatives, representing the 8th Legislative District. He was initially elected to fill the unexpired term of Jerome Delvin, who had resigned to take a seat in the state senate. Sean McGrath had held the seat in the interim. He was born in Iowa City, Iowa and previously served 14 years on the Richland City Council. In February 2018, Haler announced that he would not seek re-election to the Washington State House of Representatives.

== Awards ==
- 2014 Guardians of Small Business award. Presented by NFIB.
