= Matt Boehnke =

American politician from Washington

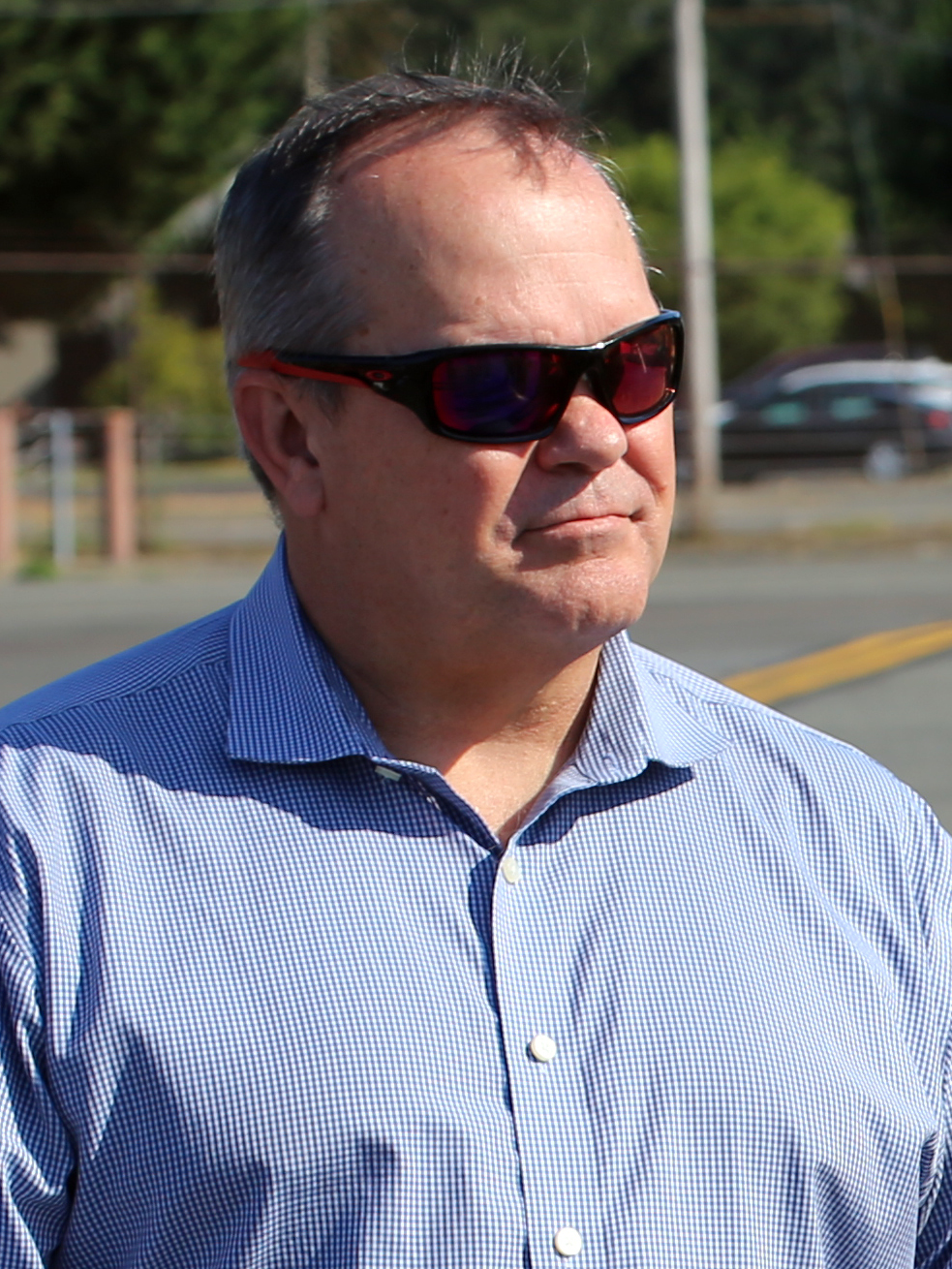
- Boehnke in 2024

Member of the Washington State Senate from the 8th district
- Incumbent
- Assumed office January 9, 2023
- Preceded by: Sharon Brown

Member of the Washington House of Representatives from the 8th district
- In office January 14, 2019 – January 9, 2023
- Preceded by: Larry Haler
- Succeeded by: April Connors

Personal details
- Born: Matthew A. Boehnke; June 1968 (age 58) Santa Maria, California, U.S.
- Party: Republican
- Spouse: Dawn Boehnke
- Education: Eastern Washington University (BA)
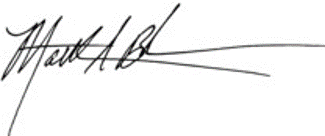
- Signature

Matthew A. Boehnke (born June 1968) is an American politician from Washington. Boehnke is a Republican member of the Washington State Senate.

== Career ==
Boehnke, a former lieutenant colonel in the United States Army, was first elected to the state legislature in 2018, running against Democratic candidate Christopher Tracy for an open seat vacated by the departure of Larry Haler. Before joining the House of Representatives, he served on the Kennewick city council, to which he was elected in 2015.

Until 2023, Boehnke represented the 8th Legislative District, which includes the city of Kennewick, as well as parts of Richland.

In 2022, Boehnke entered the race for the Washington State Senate, representing Washington's 8th legislative district. Boehnke won the race and assumed office in January 2023.

Boehnke ran for Washington's 4th congressional district in 2026 to replace outgoing representative Dan Newhouse. He finished fourth in the primary.

== Awards ==
- 2020 Guardians of Small Business. Presented by NFIB.
- 2021 City Champion Awards. Presented by Association of Washington Cities (AWC).
