= Tony P. Mardesich =

American politician

Tony Mardesich
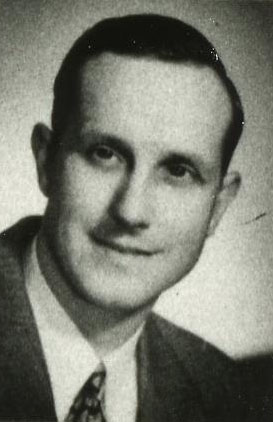
- Mardesich in 1949

Member of the Washington House of Representatives from the 38th district
- In office January 10, 1949 – June 10, 1949
- Preceded by: Fred Lehman
- Succeeded by: August P. Mardesich

Personal details
- Born: January 11, 1919 San Pedro, California, U.S.
- Died: June 10, 1949 (aged 30) at the Bering Sea
- Party: Democratic
- Occupation: fisherman

Anton P. Mardesich (January 11, 1919 – June 10, 1949) was an American commercial fisherman and politician in the state of Washington. He served in the Washington House of Representatives in 1949 for district 38. He was killed in a fishing accident in 1949, along with his father, Nicola. His brother, August P. Mardesich, who had survived the ordeal, later succeeded him in the House of Representatives.
