= Curtis Ludwig =

American lawyer and politician (1929–2012)

Member of the Washington State Gambling Commission
- In office 1996–2004

Member of the Washington Senate from the 8th district
- In office 1993–1994
- Preceded by: Jim Jesernig
- Succeeded by: Pat Hale

Member of the Washington House of Representatives from the 8th Position 2 district
- In office 1990–1993
- Preceded by: Shirley Hankins
- Succeeded by: Jerome Delvin

Personal details
- Born: Curtis Leroy Ludwig; April 21, 1929 Talent, Oregon, U.S.
- Died: October 18, 2012 (aged 83) Richland, Washington, U.S.
- Party: Democratic

Curtis Leroy Ludwig (April 21, 1929 – October 18, 2012) was an American lawyer and politician.

== Early life and education ==
Ludwig was born to parents Ethel and William Ludwig on April 21, 1929. At the time, the Ludwig family lived in Talent, Oregon. Curtis was raised in Oregon and Northern California, then later moved to Richland, Washington, where he graduated from Columbia High School. Ludwig returned to Oregon for college, completing an undergraduate degree at the University of Oregon, then earning a Doctorate of Jurisprudence in 1952 at Willamette University Law School.

== Legal and public service career ==
Ludwig completed three years of service in the United States Army, and worked as an insurance claims adjuster in Spokane before passing the Washington bar exam in 1954. He began a private legal practice in Kennewick and started his prosecutorial career for Benton County in 1960. Ludwig was a deputy prosecutor for twelve years, and won his first election for head prosecutor in 1974. He served in that position for fourteen years, retiring from the Benton County Prosecutor's Office in 1987. From 1963, Ludwig concurrently served as U.S. Court Commissioner for Eastern Washington.

Ludwig sat in the Washington House of Representatives as a Democrat for the 8th district from 1990 until his appointment to the Washington State Senate, replacing another Democrat, Jim Jesernig, in 1993. In turn, Ludwig was succeeded by Pat Hale, a Republican. He then served two terms as a judge pro tempore. The first of Ludwig's two terms on the Washington State Gambling Commission started in 1996. He was reappointed to the commission in 2000, returned to the private practice of law for a short period in 2001, then retired in 2004.

== Death ==
Ludwig died in Richland on October 18, 2012, at the age of 83.
