= 2016 Washington House of Representatives election =

Washington State House elections, 2016
- November 8, 2016

98 seats of the Washington State House of Representatives 50 seats needed for a majority
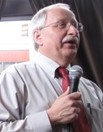

| | Majority party | Minority party |
|---|---|---|
| Leader | Frank Chopp | Dan Kristiansen |
| Party | Democratic | Republican |
| Leader's seat | 43rd-Seattle | 39th-Snohomish |
| Last election | 51 | 47 |
| Seats before | 50 | 48 |
| Seats won | 50 | 48 |
| Seat change | Steady | Steady |
| Popular vote | 3,130,575 | 2,490,772 |
| Percentage | 54.2% | 43.1% |
| Swing | ▲5.6% | ▼4.2% |
- Results: Democratic gain Republican gain Democratic hold Republican hold
House Speaker before election
Frank Chopp
Democratic
Elected House Speaker
Frank Chopp
Democratic

The Washington State House elections, 2016 are biennial elections in which each of the 49 legislative districts in Washington choose two people to represent them in the Washington State House of Representatives. Roughly half of the members of the Washington Senate are elected concurrently to four-year terms from identical legislative districts. The election was held on November 8, 2016.

A top two primary election in August 2016 determines which two candidates appear on the November ballot. Candidate were allowed to write in a party preference.

== Overview ==
Washington State House Elections, 2016 Primary election — August 2, 2016
| Party | Votes | Percentage | Candidates | Advancing to general | Seats contesting |
|---|---|---|---|---|---|
| Democratic | 1,378,545 | 55.06% | 118 | 88 | |
| Republican | 1,041,085 | 41.58% | 100 | 77 | |
| Libertarian | 60,618 | 2.42% | 11 | 8 | |
| Independent | 23,647 | 0.94% | 18 | 3 | |
| Totals | 2,503,895 | 100.00% | 247 | 176 | — |

Washington State House Elections, 2016 General election — November 8, 2016
| Party | Votes | Percentage | Seats | +/– |
|---|---|---|---|---|
| Democratic | 3,130,575 | 54.15% | 50 | Steady |
| Republican | 2,490,772 | 43.08% | 48 | Steady |
| Libertarian | 127,096 | 2.20% | 0 | Steady |
| Independent | 33,244 | 0.57% | 0 | Steady |
| Totals | 5,781,687 | 100.0% | 98 | — |

=== Composition ===
| Races with Democratic Incumbent | Seats |
| Contested, vs Republican | 25 |
| Uncontested | 10 |
| Contested, vs Libertarian | 4 |
| Contested, vs Independent | 2 |
| Total | 41 |

| Races with Republican Incumbent | Seats |
| Contested, vs Democrat | 32 |
| Uncontested | 6 |
| Contested, vs Republican | 3 |
| Contested, vs Libertarian | 2 |
| Contested, vs Independent | 0 |
| Total | 43 |

| Open Races | Seats |
| Republican vs Democrat | 10 |
| Democrat vs Democrat | 2 |
| Uncontested Democrat | 2 |
| Total | 14 |

== Predictions ==
| Source | Ranking | As of |
|---|---|---|
| Governing | Lean D | October 12, 2016 |

== Results ==
=== District 1 ===
Washington's 1st legislative district House 1 election, 2016
Primary election
| Party | Candidate | Votes | % |
|---|---|---|---|
| Democratic | Derek Stanford (incumbent) | 14,512 | 49.6 |
| Republican | Neil Thannisch | 7,026 | 24.0 |
| Republican | Brian M. Travis | 4,360 | 14.9 |
| Democratic | Kazuaki Sugiyama | 3,379 | 11.5 |
| Total votes | | 29,277 | 100.0 |
General election
| Democratic | Derek Stanford (incumbent) | 43,207 | 61.0 |
| Republican | Neil Thannisch | 27,661 | 39.0 |
| Total votes | | 70,868 | 100.0 |
| Democratic hold | | | |

Washington's 1st legislative district House 2 election, 2016
Primary election
| Party | Candidate | Votes | % |
|---|---|---|---|
| Republican | Jim Langston | 11,657 | 39.7 |
| Democratic | Shelley Kloba | 9,211 | 31.3 |
| Democratic | Darshan Rauniyar | 3,719 | 12.7 |
| Democratic | Kyoko Matsumoto Wright | 3,003 | 10.2 |
| Democratic | Aaron Moreau-Cook | 1,792 | 6.1 |
| Total votes | | 29,382 | 100.0 |
General election
| Democratic | Shelley Kloba | 39,076 | 55.2 |
| Republican | Jim Langston | 31,739 | 44.8 |
| Total votes | | 70,815 | 100.0 |
| Democratic hold | | | |

=== District 2 ===
Washington's 2nd legislative district House 1 election, 2016
Primary election
| Party | Candidate | Votes | % |
|---|---|---|---|
| Republican | Andrew Barkis (incumbent) | 13,670 | 57.9 |
| Democratic | Amy Pivetta Hoffman | 9,944 | 42.1 |
| Total votes | | 23,614 | 100.0 |
General election
| Republican | Andrew Barkis (incumbent) | 34,167 | 58.2 |
| Democratic | Amy Pivetta Hoffman (Note: Listed on ballot as an "Independent Democrat.") | 24,544 | 41.8 |
| Total votes | | 58,711 | 100.0 |
| Republican hold | | | |

Washington's 2nd legislative district House 2 election, 2016
Primary election
| Party | Candidate | Votes | % |
|---|---|---|---|
| Republican | J.T. Wilcox (incumbent) | 15,708 | 65.9 |
| Democratic | Derek Maynes | 4,563 | 19.1 |
| Democratic | Nathaniel Downes | 3,578 | 15.0 |
| Total votes | | 23,849 | 100.0 |
General election
| Republican | J.T. Wilcox (incumbent) | 39,033 | 65.7 |
| Democratic | Derek Maynes | 20,413 | 34.3 |
| Total votes | | 59,446 | 100.0 |
| Republican hold | | | |

=== District 3 ===
Washington's 3rd legislative district House 1 election, 2016
Primary election
| Party | Candidate | Votes | % |
|---|---|---|---|
| Democratic | Marcus Riccelli (incumbent) | 14,148 | 71.4 |
| Libertarian | Randy McGlenn II | 5,660 | 28.6 |
| Total votes | | 29,896 | 100.0 |
General election
| Democratic | Marcus Riccelli (incumbent) | 33,484 | 67.3 |
| Libertarian | Randy McGlenn II | 16,260 | 32.7 |
| Total votes | | 49,744 | 100.0 |
| Democratic hold | | | |

Washington's 3rd legislative district House 2 election, 2016
Primary election
| Party | Candidate | Votes | % |
|---|---|---|---|
| Democratic | Timm Ormsby (incumbent) | 13,335 | 62.8 |
| Republican | Laura Carder | 6,167 | 29.1 |
| Libertarian | Paul Delaney | 1,729 | 8.1 |
| Total votes | | 21,231 | 100.0 |
General election
| Democratic | Timm Ormsby (incumbent) | 31,878 | 62.1 |
| Republican | Laura Carder | 19,460 | 37.9 |
| Total votes | | 51,338 | 100.0 |
| Democratic hold | | | |

=== District 4 ===
Washington's 4th legislative district House 1 election, 2016
Primary election
| Party | Candidate | Votes | % |
|---|---|---|---|
| Republican | Matt Shea (incumbent) | 17,226 | 60.4 |
| Democratic | Scott V. Stucker | 11,290 | 39.6 |
| Total votes | | 28,516 | 100.0 |
General election
| Republican | Matt Shea (incumbent) | 43,914 | 64.6 |
| Democratic | Scott Stucker | 24,021 | 35.4 |
| Total votes | | 67,935 | 100.0 |
| Republican hold | | | |

Washington's 4th legislative district House 2 election, 2016
Primary election
| Party | Candidate | Votes | % |
|---|---|---|---|
| Republican | Bob McCaslin Jr. (incumbent) | 21,234 | 100.0 |
General election
| Republican | Bob McCaslin Jr. (incumbent) | 55,755 | 100.0 |
| Republican hold | | | |

=== District 5 ===
Washington's 5th legislative district House 1 election, 2016
Primary election
| Party | Candidate | Votes | % |
|---|---|---|---|
| Republican | Jay Rodne (incumbent) | 16,052 | 54.4 |
| Democratic | Jason Ritchie | 13,456 | 45.6 |
| Total votes | | 29,508 | 100.0 |
General election
| Republican | Jay Rodne (incumbent) | 37,772 | 51.9 |
| Democratic | Jason Ritchie | 34,954 | 48.1 |
| Total votes | | 72,726 | 100.0 |
| Republican hold | | | |

Washington's 5th legislative district House 2 election, 2016
Primary election
| Party | Candidate | Votes | % |
|---|---|---|---|
| Republican | Paul Graves | 13,843 | 46.3 |
| Democratic | Darcy Burner | 11,014 | 36.8 |
| Democratic | Matt Larson | 5,056 | 16.9 |
| Total votes | | 29,913 | 100.0 |
General election
| Republican | Paul Graves | 39,330 | 53.7 |
| Democratic | Darcy Burner | 33,838 | 46.3 |
| Total votes | | 73,168 | 100.0 |
| Republican hold | | | |

=== District 6 ===
Washington's 6th legislative district House 1 election, 2016
Primary election
| Party | Candidate | Votes | % |
|---|---|---|---|
| Democratic | Lynnette Vehrs | 13,022 | 42.7 |
| Republican | Mike Volz | 8,948 | 29.3 |
| Republican | Ian Field | 6,007 | 19.7 |
| Republican | Samuel Canty | 1,277 | 4.2 |
| Independent | Barry Pfundt | 8,568 | 4.1 |
| Total votes | | 30,499 | 100.0 |
General election
| Republican | Mike Volz | 37,702 | 55.3 |
| Democratic | Lynnette Vehrs | 30,421 | 44.7 |
| Total votes | | 68,123 | 100.0 |
| Republican hold | | | |

Washington's 6th legislative district House 2 election, 2016
Primary election
| Party | Candidate | Votes | % |
|---|---|---|---|
| Republican | Jeff Holy (incumbent) | 17,704 | 58.0 |
| Democratic | Shar Lichty | 12,835 | 42.0 |
| Total votes | | 30,539 | 100.0 |
General election
| Republican | Jeff Holy (incumbent) | 42,948 | 62.9 |
| Democratic | Shar Lichty | 25,302 | 37.1 |
| Total votes | | 68,250 | 100.0 |
| Republican hold | | | |

=== District 7 ===
Washington's 7th legislative district House 1 election, 2016
Primary election
| Party | Candidate | Votes | % |
|---|---|---|---|
| Republican | Shelly Short (incumbent) | 25,075 | 100.0 |
General election
| Republican | Shelly Short (incumbent) | 56,589 | 100.0 |
| Republican hold | | | |

Washington's 7th legislative district House 2 election, 2016
Primary election
| Party | Candidate | Votes | % |
|---|---|---|---|
| Republican | Joel Kretz (incumbent) | 23,161 | 79.1 |
| Libertarian | Mike Foster | 6,117 | 20.9 |
| Total votes | | 29,278 | 100.0 |
General election
| Republican | Joel Kretz (incumbent) | 49,635 | 76.9 |
| Libertarian | Mike Foster | 14,946 | 23.1 |
| Total votes | | 64,581 | 100.0 |
| Republican hold | | | |

=== District 8 ===
Washington's 8th legislative district House 1 election, 2016
Primary election
| Party | Candidate | Votes | % |
|---|---|---|---|
| Republican | Brad Klippert (incumbent) | 13,116 | 54.3 |
| Republican | Rick Jansons | 7,633 | 31.6 |
| Libertarian | Ryan Knight Cooper | 3,407 | 14.1 |
| Total votes | | 24,156 | 100.0 |
General election
| Republican | Brad Klippert (incumbent) | 33,711 | 58.7 |
| Republican | Rick Jansons | 23,750 | 41.3 |
| Total votes | | 57,461 | 100.0 |
| Republican hold | | | |

Washington's 8th legislative district House 2 election, 2016
Primary election
| Party | Candidate | Votes | % |
|---|---|---|---|
| Republican | Larry Haler (incumbent) | 14,829 | 64.2 |
| Republican | Steve Simmons | 8,288 | 35.8 |
| Total votes | | 24,156 | 100.0 |
General election
| Republican | Larry Haler (incumbent) | 34,579 | 59.8 |
| Republican | Steve Simmons | 23,211 | 40.2 |
| Total votes | | 57,790 | 100 |
| Republican hold | | | |

=== District 9 ===
Washington's 9th legislative district House 1 general election, 2016
Primary election
| Party | Candidate | Votes | % |
|---|---|---|---|
| Republican | Mary Dye (incumbent) | 12,813 | 57.7 |
| Democratic | Jennifer Goulet | 6,697 | 30.2 |
| Republican | Hailey Roemer | 2,693 | 12.1 |
| Total votes | | 22,203 | 100.0 |
General election
| Republican | Mary Dye (incumbent) | 35,640 | 66.5 |
| Democratic | Jennifer Goulet | 17,944 | 33.5 |
| Total votes | | 53,584 | 100.0 |
| Republican hold | | | |

Washington's 9th legislative district House 2 election, 2016
Primary election
| Party | Candidate | Votes | % |
|---|---|---|---|
| Republican | Joe Schmick (incumbent) | 16,816 | 100.0 |
General election
| Republican | Joe Schmick (incumbent) | 42,695 | 100.0 |
| Republican hold | | | |

=== District 10 ===
Washington's 10th legislative district House 1 election, 2016
Primary election
| Party | Candidate | Votes | % |
|---|---|---|---|
| Republican | Norma Smith (incumbent) | 23,012 | 73.1 |
| Libertarian | Michael Scott | 8,450 | 26.9 |
| Total votes | | 31,462 | 100.0 |
General election
| Republican | Norma Smith (incumbent) | 48,178 | 72.0 |
| Libertarian | Michael Scott | 18,778 | 28.0 |
| Total votes | | 66,956 | 100.0 |
| Republican hold | | | |

Washington's 10th legislative district House 2 election, 2016
Primary election
| Party | Candidate | Votes | % |
|---|---|---|---|
| Republican | Dave Hayes (incumbent) | 19,717 | 56.0 |
| Democratic | Doris Brevoort | 15,460 | 44.0 |
| Total votes | | 35,177 | 100.0 |
General election
| Republican | Dave Hayes (incumbent) | 42,962 | 59.1 |
| Democratic | Doris Brevoort | 29,756 | 40.9 |
| Total votes | | 72,718 | 100.0 |
| Republican hold | | | |

=== District 11 ===
Washington's 11th legislative district House 1 election, 2016
Primary election
| Party | Candidate | Votes | % |
|---|---|---|---|
| Democratic | Zack Hudgins (incumbent) | 13,201 | 66.3 |
| Republican | Erin Smith Aboudara | 6,701 | 33.7 |
| Total votes | | 19,902 | 100.0 |
General election
| Democratic | Zack Hudgins (incumbent) | 34,801 | 67.8 |
| Republican | Erin Smith Aboudara | 16,511 | 32.2 |
| Total votes | | 51,312 | 100.0 |
| Democratic hold | | | |

Washington's 11th legislative district House 2 election, 2016
Primary election
| Party | Candidate | Votes | % |
|---|---|---|---|
| Democratic | Steve Bergquist (incumbent) | 15,523 | 100.0 |
General election
| Democratic | Steve Bergquist (incumbent) | 41,507 | 100.0 |
| Democratic hold | | | |

=== District 12 ===
Washington's 12th legislative district House 1 election, 2016
Primary election
| Party | Candidate | Votes | % |
|---|---|---|---|
| Republican | Cary Condotta (incumbent) | 17,897 | 64.3 |
| Democratic | Dan Maher | 9,928 | 35.7 |
| Total votes | | 27,825 | 100.0 |
General election
| Republican | Cary Condotta (incumbent) | 36,748 | 62.9 |
| Democratic | Dan Maher | 21,653 | 37.1 |
| Total votes | | 58,401 | 100.0 |
| Republican hold | | | |

Washington's 12th legislative district House 2 election, 2016
Primary election
| Party | Candidate | Votes | % |
|---|---|---|---|
| Republican | Mike Steele | 8,129 | 35.1 |
| Republican | Jerry Paine | 6,001 | 25.9 |
| Republican | Garn G. Christensen | 5,365 | 23.2 |
| Republican | Danny Stone | 3,645 | 15.8 |
| Total votes | | 23,140 | 100.0 |
General election
| Republican | Mike Steele | 30,397 | 60.2 |
| Republican | Jerry Paine | 20,112 | 39.8 |
| Total votes | | 50,509 | 100.0 |
| Republican hold | | | |

=== District 13 ===
Washington's 13th legislative district House 1 election, 2016
Primary election
| Party | Candidate | Votes | % |
|---|---|---|---|
| Republican | Tom Dent (incumbent) | 17,101 | 100.0 |
General election
| Republican | Tom Dent (incumbent) | 41,673 | 100.0 |
| Republican hold | | | |

Washington's 13th legislative district House 2 election, 2016
Primary election
| Party | Candidate | Votes | % |
|---|---|---|---|
| Republican | Matt Manweller (incumbent) | 14,883 | 70.3 |
| Democratic | Jordan Webb | 6,290 | 29.7 |
| Total votes | | 21,173 | 100.0 |
General election
| Republican | Matt Manweller (incumbent) | 35,071 | 70.7 |
| Democratic | Jordan Webb | 14,507 | 29.3 |
| Total votes | | 49,578 | 100.0 |
| Republican hold | | | |

=== District 14 ===
Washington's 14th legislative district House 1 election, 2016
Primary election
| Party | Candidate | Votes | % |
|---|---|---|---|
| Republican | Norm Johnson (incumbent) | 14,920 | 67.5 |
| Democratic | Susan Soto Palmer | 7,167 | 32.5 |
| Total votes | | 22,087 | 100.0 |
General election
| Republican | Norm Johnson (incumbent) | 35,787 | 66.0 |
| Democratic | Susan Soto Palmer | 18,393 | 34.0 |
| Total votes | | 54,180 | 100.0 |
| Republican hold | | | |

Washington's 14th legislative district House 2 election, 2016
Primary election
| Party | Candidate | Votes | % |
|---|---|---|---|
| Republican | Gina McCabe (incumbent) | 14,759 | 67.0 |
| Democratic | Susan Soto Palmer | 7,256 | 33.0 |
| Total votes | | 22,087 | 100.0 |
General election
| Republican | Gina McCabe (incumbent) | 36,848 | 68.5 |
| Democratic | John (Eric) Adams | 16,914 | 31.5 |
| Total votes | | 53,762 | 100.0 |
| Republican hold | | | |

=== District 15 ===
Washington's 15th legislative district House 1 election, 2016
Primary election
| Party | Candidate | Votes | % |
|---|---|---|---|
| Republican | Bruce Chandler (incumbent) | 10,528 | 100.0 |
General election
| Republican | Bruce Chandler (incumbent) | 30,433 | 100.0 |
| Republican hold | | | |

Washington's 15th legislative district House 2 election, 2016
Primary election
| Party | Candidate | Votes | % |
|---|---|---|---|
| Republican | David Taylor (incumbent) | 4,962 | 38.1 |
| Democratic | AJ Cooper | 4,033 | 31.0 |
| Republican | Dave Kearby | 4,025 | 30.9 |
| Total votes | | 13,020 | 100.0 |
General election
| Republican | David Taylor (incumbent) | 21,926 | 60.2 |
| Democratic | AJ Cooper | 14,491 | 39.8 |
| Total votes | | 36,417 | 100.0 |
| Republican hold | | | |

=== District 16 ===
Washington's 16th legislative district House 1 election, 2016
Primary election
| Party | Candidate | Votes | % |
|---|---|---|---|
| Democratic | Rebecca Francik | 5,933 | 28.7 |
| Republican | Bill Jenkin | 4,422 | 21.4 |
| Republican | Skyler Rude | 4,006 | 19.4 |
| Republican | Mary Ruth Edwards | 3,665 | 17.7 |
| Republican | Allen Pomraning | 2,659 | 12.8 |
| Total votes | | 20,685 | 100.0 |
General election
| Republican | Bill Jenkin | 29,812 | 62.0 |
| Democratic | Rebecca Francik | 18,252 | 38.0 |
| Total votes | | 48,064 | 100.0 |
| Republican hold | | | |

Washington's 16th legislative district House 2 election, 2016
Primary election
| Party | Candidate | Votes | % |
|---|---|---|---|
| Republican | Terry Nealey (incumbent) | 12,914 | 62.5 |
| Democratic | Gary Downing | 6,020 | 29.1 |
| Republican | Ricardo Espinoza | 1,746 | 8.4 |
| Total votes | | 20,680 | 100.0 |
General election
| Republican | Terry Nealey (incumbent) | 32,860 | 67.9 |
| Democratic | Gary Downing | 15,507 | 32.1 |
| Total votes | | 48,367 | 100.0 |
| Republican hold | | | |

=== District 17 ===
Washington's 17th legislative district House 1 election, 2016
Primary election
| Party | Candidate | Votes | % |
|---|---|---|---|
| Republican | Vicki Kraft | 7,714 | 33.5 |
| Democratic | Sam Kim | 4,905 | 21.3 |
| Democratic | Don Orange | 4,241 | 18.4 |
| Republican | Jerry Oliver | 3,369 | 14.6 |
| Democratic | Rob Frisina | 1,716 | 7.5 |
| Democratic | Joshua Egan | 1,077 | 4.7 |
| Total votes | | 23,022 | 100.0 |
General election
| Republican | Vicki Kraft | 30,552 | 51.7 |
| Democratic | Sam Kim | 28,585 | 48.3 |
| Total votes | | 59,137 | 100 |
| Republican hold | | | |

Washington's 17th legislative district House 2 election, 2016
Primary election
| Party | Candidate | Votes | % |
|---|---|---|---|
| Republican | Paul Harris (incumbent) | 10,633 | 47.3 |
| Democratic | Martin Hash | 8,820 | 39.3 |
| Republican | Richard Colwell | 3,005 | 13.4 |
| Total votes | | 22,458 | 100.0 |
General election
| Republican | Paul Harris (incumbent) | 36,936 | 63.1 |
| Democratic | Martin Hash | 21,602 | 36.9 |
| Total votes | | 58,538 | 100.0 |
| Republican hold | | | |

=== District 18 ===
Washington's 18th legislative district House 1 election, 2016
Primary election
| Party | Candidate | Votes | % |
|---|---|---|---|
| Republican | Brandon Vick (incumbent) | 16,197 | 58.2 |
| Democratic | Justin Oberg | 8,884 | 32.0 |
| Democratic | Lisa Anderson | 2,726 | 9.8 |
| Total votes | | 27,807 | 100.0 |
General election
| Republican | Brandon Vick (incumbent) | 44,729 | 63.3 |
| Democratic | Justin Oberg | 25,874 | 36.7 |
| Total votes | | 70,603 | 100 |
| Republican hold | | | |

Washington's 18th legislative district House 2 election, 2016
Primary election
| Party | Candidate | Votes | % |
|---|---|---|---|
| Republican | Liz Pike (incumbent) | 11,972 | 42.5 |
| Democratic | Kathy Gillespie | 8,170 | 29.0 |
| Republican | Shane A. Bowman | 4,368 | 15.5 |
| Democratic | Ilana Brown | 3,665 | 13.0 |
| Total votes | | 28,175 | 100.0 |
General election
| Republican | Liz Pike (incumbent) | 40,354 | 56.8 |
| Democratic | Kathy Gillespie | 30,665 | 43.2 |
| Total votes | | 71,019 | 100 |
| Republican hold | | | |

=== District 19 ===
Washington's 19th legislative district House 1 election, 2016
Primary election
| Party | Candidate | Votes | % |
|---|---|---|---|
| Republican | Jim Walsh | 7,675 | 29.0 |
| Democratic | Teresa Purcell | 6,411 | 24.2 |
| Democratic | JD Rossetti (incumbent) | 6,361 | 24.0 |
| Republican | Val Tinney | 3,877 | 14.6 |
| Democratic | Tim Sutinen | 2,180 | 8.2 |
| Total votes | | 26,504 | 100.0 |
General election
| Republican | Jim Walsh | 28,693 | 50.5 |
| Democratic | Teresa Purcell | 28,134 | 49.5 |
| Total votes | | 56,827 | 100.0 |
| Republican gain from Democratic | | | |

Washington's 19th legislative district House 2 election, 2016
Primary election
| Party | Candidate | Votes | % |
|---|---|---|---|
| Democratic | Brian Blake (incumbent) | 14,470 | 55.1 |
| Republican | Jimi O'Hagan | 10,260 | 39.1 |
| Democratic | Butch Stavrum | 1,523 | 5.8 |
| Total votes | | 26,253 | 100.0 |
General election
| Democratic | Brian Blake (incumbent) | 33,629 | 59.9 |
| Republican | Jimi O'Hagan | 22,504 | 40.1 |
| Total votes | | 56,133 | 100.0 |
| Democratic hold | | | |

=== District 20 ===
Washington's 20th legislative district House 1 election, 2016
Primary election
| Party | Candidate | Votes | % |
|---|---|---|---|
| Republican | Richard DeBolt (incumbent) | 19,080 | 100.0 |
General election
| Republican | Richard DeBolt (incumbent) (Note: Listed on ballot as an "GOP Party.") | 47,206 | 100.0 |
| Republican hold | | | |

Washington's 20th legislative district House 2 election, 2016
Primary election
| Party | Candidate | Votes | % |
|---|---|---|---|
| Republican | Ed Orcutt (incumbent) | 19,699 | 100.0 |
General election
| Republican | Ed Orcutt (incumbent) | 49,195 | 100.0 |
| Republican hold | | | |

=== District 21 ===
Washington's 21st legislative district House 1 election, 2016
Primary election
| Party | Candidate | Votes | % |
|---|---|---|---|
| Democratic | Strom Peterson (incumbent) | 18,958 | 77.2 |
| Libertarian | Alex Hels | 5,601 | 22.8 |
| Total votes | | 24,559 | 100.0 |
General election
| Democratic | Strom Peterson (incumbent) | 43,184 | 72.2 |
| Libertarian | Alex Hels | 16,639 | 27.8 |
| Total votes | | 59,823 | 100.0 |
| Democratic hold | | | |

Washington's 21st legislative district House 2 election, 2016
Primary election
| Party | Candidate | Votes | % |
|---|---|---|---|
| Democratic | Lillian Ortiz-Self (incumbent) | 14,760 | 56.5 |
| Republican | Jeff Scherrer | 8,449 | 32.4 |
| Libertarian | Bruce Guthrie | 1,652 | 6.3 |
| Independent | Mohammed Riaz Khan | 1,248 | 4.8 |
| Total votes | | 26,109 | 100.0 |
General election
| Democratic | Lillian Ortiz-Self (incumbent) | 38,170 | 61.9 |
| Republican | Jeff Scherrer | 23,466 | 38.1 |
| Total votes | | 61,636 | 100.00 |
| Democratic hold | | | |

=== District 22 ===
Washington's 22nd legislative district House 1 election, 2016
Primary election
| Party | Candidate | Votes | % |
|---|---|---|---|
| Democratic | Laurie Dolan | 10,352 | 31.3 |
| Republican | Donald Austin | 9,231 | 27.9 |
| Democratic | Karen Johnson | 6,542 | 19.8 |
| Democratic | Rhenda Iris Strub | 5,251 | 15.9 |
| Democratic | Franklin Edwards | 1,694 | 5.1 |
| Total votes | | 33,070 | 100.0 |
General election
| Democratic | Laurie Dolan | 46,088 | 66.3 |
| Republican | Donald Austin | 23,405 | 33.7 |
| Total votes | | 69,493 | 100.0 |
| Democratic hold | | | |

Washington's 22nd legislative district House 2 election, 2016
Primary election
| Party | Candidate | Votes | % |
|---|---|---|---|
| Democratic | Beth Doglio | 23,257 | 31.3 |
General election
| Democratic | Beth Doglio | 52,053 | 100.0 |
| Democratic hold | | | |

=== District 23 ===
Washington's 23rd legislative district House 1 election, 2016
Primary election
| Party | Candidate | Votes | % |
|---|---|---|---|
| Democratic | Sherry Appleton (incumbent) | 16,475 | 53.9 |
| Republican | Loretta Brynes | 7,870 | 25.7 |
| Republican | April Ferguson | 4,021 | 13.2 |
| Democratic | Jack Carroll | 2,208 | 7.2 |
| Total votes | | 30,574 | 100.0 |
General election
| Democratic | Sherry Appleton (incumbent) | 39,457 | 57.2 |
| Republican | Loretta Brynes | 29,491 | 42.8 |
| Total votes | | 68,948 | 100.0 |
| Democratic hold | | | |

Washington's 23rd legislative district House 2 election, 2016
Primary election
| Party | Candidate | Votes | % |
|---|---|---|---|
| Democratic | Drew Hansen (incumbent) | 22,258 | 100.0 |
General election
| Democratic | Drew Hansen (incumbent) | 50,973 | 100.0 |
| Democratic hold | | | |

=== District 24 ===
Washington's 24th legislative district House 1 election, 2016
Primary election
| Party | Candidate | Votes | % |
|---|---|---|---|
| Democratic | Mike Chapman | 16,506 | 46.3 |
| Republican | George Vrable | 13,239 | 37.2 |
| Democratic | Tammy Ramsay | 5,871 | 16.5 |
| Total votes | | 35,616 | 100.0 |
General election
| Democratic | Mike Chapman | 43,847 | 60.9 |
| Republican | George Vrable | 28,150 | 39.1 |
| Total votes | | 71,997 | 100.0 |
| Democratic hold | | | |

Washington's 24th legislative district House 2 election, 2016
Primary election
| Party | Candidate | Votes | % |
|---|---|---|---|
| Democratic | Steve Tharinger (incumbent) | 21,567 | 60.9 |
| Republican | John D. Alger | 13,848 | 39.1 |
| Total votes | | 35,616 | 100.0 |
General election
| Democratic | Steve Tharinger (incumbent) | 40,704 | 56.9 |
| Republican | John D. Alger (Note: Listed on ballot as an "GOP/Independent Party.") | 30,895 | 43.1 |
| Total votes | | 71,599 | 100.0 |
| Democratic hold | | | |

=== District 25 ===
Washington's 25th legislative district House 1 election, 2016
Primary election
| Party | Candidate | Votes | % |
|---|---|---|---|
| Republican | Melanie Stambaugh (incumbent) | 13,805 | 57.0 |
| Democratic | Jamie Smith | 10,419 | 43.0 |
| Total votes | | 24,357 | 100.0 |
General election
| Republican | Melanie Stambaugh (incumbent) | 34,719 | 58.6 |
| Democratic | Jamie Smith | 24,549 | 41.4 |
| Total votes | | 59,268 | 100.0 |
| Republican hold | | | |

Washington's 25th legislative district House 2 election, 2016
Primary election
| Party | Candidate | Votes | % |
|---|---|---|---|
| Republican | Joyce McDonald | 13,805 | 57.0 |
| Democratic | Michelle Chatterton | 10,419 | 43.0 |
| Total votes | | 24,357 | 100.0 |
General election
| Republican | Joyce McDonald | 33,101 | 56.2 |
| Democratic | Michelle Chatterton | 25,804 | 43.8 |
| Total votes | | 58,905 | 100.0 |
| Republican hold | | | |

=== District 26 ===
Washington's 26th legislative district House 1 election, 2016
Primary election
| Party | Candidate | Votes | % |
|---|---|---|---|
| Republican | Jesse Young (incumbent) | 12,291 | 39.5 |
| Democratic | Larry Seaquist | 11,275 | 36.2 |
| Democratic | Alec Matias | 4,168 | 13.4 |
| Republican | Bill Scheidler | 3,389 | 10.9 |
| Total votes | | 31,123 | 100.0 |
General election
| Republican | Jesse Young (incumbent) | 39,857 | 56.9 |
| Democratic | Larry Seaquist | 30,224 | 43.1 |
| Total votes | | 70,081 | 100.0 |
| Republican hold | | | |

Washington's 26th legislative district House 2 election, 2016
Primary election
| Party | Candidate | Votes | % |
|---|---|---|---|
| Republican | Michelle Caldier (incumbent) | 17,103 | 56.9 |
| Democratic | Randy Spitzer | 12,958 | 43.1 |
| Total votes | | 30,061 | 100.0 |
General election
| Republican | Michelle Caldier (incumbent) | 40,755 | 58.9 |
| Democratic | Randy Spitzer | 28,387 | 41.1 |
| Total votes | | 69,142 | 100.0 |
| Republican hold | | | |

=== District 27 ===
Washington's 27th legislative district House 1 election, 2016
Primary election
| Party | Candidate | Votes | % |
|---|---|---|---|
| Democratic | Laurie Jinkins (incumbent) | 18,810 | 100.0 |
General election
| Democratic | Laurie Jinkins (incumbent) | 46,263 | 100.0 |
| Democratic hold | | | |

Washington's 27th legislative district House 2 election, 2016
Primary election
| Party | Candidate | Votes | % |
|---|---|---|---|
| Democratic | Jake Fey (incumbent) | 18,835 | 100.0 |
General election
| Democratic | Jake Fey (incumbent) | 46,153 | 100.0 |
| Democratic hold | | | |

=== District 28 ===
Washington's 28th legislative district House 1 election, 2016
Primary election
| Party | Candidate | Votes | % |
|---|---|---|---|
| Republican | Dick Muri (incumbent) | 13,794 | 52.9 |
| Democratic | Mari Leavitt | 10,260 | 39.3 |
| Democratic | Anne Setsuko Giroux | 2,033 | 7.8 |
| Total votes | | 26,087 | 100.0 |
General election
| Republican | Dick Muri (incumbent) | 29,503 | 52.1 |
| Democratic | Mari Leavitt | 27,128 | 47.9 |
| Total votes | | 56,631 | 100.00 |
| Republican hold | | | |

Washington's 28th legislative district House 2 election, 2016
Primary election
| Party | Candidate | Votes | % |
|---|---|---|---|
| Democratic | Christine Kilduff (incumbent) | 13,447 | 50.9 |
| Republican | Paul Wagemann | 7,294 | 27.6 |
| Republican | Michael Winkler | 4,839 | 18.3 |
| Libertarian | Brandon Lyons | 867 | 3.3 |
| Total votes | | 26,447 | 100.0 |
General election
| Democratic | Christine Kilduff (incumbent) | 30,920 | 54.7 |
| Republican | Paul Wagemann | 25,582 | 45.3 |
| Total votes | | 56,502 | 100 |

=== District 29 ===
Washington's 29th legislative district House 1 election, 2016
Primary election
| Party | Candidate | Votes | % |
|---|---|---|---|
| Democratic | David Sawyer (incumbent) | 6,252 | 41.0 |
| Republican | Rick Thomas | 5,381 | 35.3 |
| Democratic | Branden Durst | 3,614 | 23.7 |
| Total votes | | 15,247 | 100.0 |
General election
| Democratic | David Sawyer (incumbent) | 24,234 | 59.3 |
| Republican | Rick Thomas (Note: Listed on ballot as an "Independent Republican.") | 16,646 | 40.7 |
| Total votes | | 40,880 | 100.0 |
| Democratic hold | | | |

Washington's 29th legislative district House 2 election, 2016
Primary election
| Party | Candidate | Votes | % |
|---|---|---|---|
| Democratic | Steve Kirby (incumbent) | 9,633 | 61.7 |
| Republican | Jessica Garcia | 5,984 | 38.3 |
| Total votes | | 15,617 | 100.0 |
General election
| Democratic | Steve Kirby (incumbent) | 25,318 | 60.8 |
| Republican | Jessica Garcia | 16,334 | 39.2 |
| Total votes | | 41,652 | 100.0 |
| Democratic hold | | | |

=== District 30 ===
Washington's 30th legislative district House 1 election, 2016
Primary election
| Party | Candidate | Votes | % |
|---|---|---|---|
| Democratic | Mike Pellicciotti | 10,828 | 52.3 |
| Republican | Linda Kochmar (incumbent) | 9,873 | 47.7 |
| Total votes | | 20,701 | 100.0 |
General election
| Democratic | Mike Pellicciotti | 26,820 | 54.4 |
| Republican | Linda Kochmar (incumbent) | 22,465 | 45.6 |
| Total votes | | 49,285 | 100.0 |
| Democratic gain from Republican | | | |

Washington's 30th legislative district House 2 election, 2016
Primary election
| Party | Candidate | Votes | % |
|---|---|---|---|
| Democratic | Kristine Reeves | 10,412 | 50.2 |
| Republican | Teri Hickel (incumbent) | 10,344 | 49.8 |
| Total votes | | 20,756 | 100.0 |
General election
| Democratic | Kristine Reeves | 25,206 | 51.1 |
| Republican | Teri Hickel (incumbent) | 24,124 | 48.9 |
| Total votes | | 49,330 | 100.0 |
| Democratic gain from Republican | | | |

=== District 31 ===
Washington's 31st legislative district House 1 election, 2016
Primary election
| Party | Candidate | Votes | % |
|---|---|---|---|
| Republican | Drew Stokesbary (incumbent) | 17,184 | 74.0 |
| Libertarian | John Frostad | 6,045 | 26.0 |
| Total votes | | 23,229 | 100.0 |
General election
| Republican | Drew Stokesbary (incumbent) | 42,776 | 71.6 |
| Libertarian | John Frostad | 16,976 | 28.4 |
| Total votes | | 59,752 | 100.0 |
| Republican hold | | | |

Washington's 31st legislative district House 2 election, 2016
Primary election
| Party | Candidate | Votes | % |
|---|---|---|---|
| Republican | Phil Fortunato | 9,878 | 39.9 |
| Democratic | Lane Walthers | 9,007 | 36.4 |
| Republican | Morgan Irwin | 3,580 | 14.4 |
| Republican | Pablo Monroy | 2,316 | 36.3 |
| Total votes | | 24,781 | 100.0 |
General election
| Republican | Phil Fortunato | 36,000 | 57.7 |
| Democratic | Lane Walthers | 26,364 | 42.3 |
| Total votes | | 62,364 | 100.0 |
| Republican gain from Democratic | | | |

=== District 32 ===
Washington's 32nd legislative district House 1 election, 2016
Primary election
| Party | Candidate | Votes | % |
|---|---|---|---|
| Democratic | Cindy Ryu (incumbent) | 22,927 | 73.8 |
| Republican | Alvin Rutledge | 5,680 | 18.3 |
| Independent | Keith Smith | 2,445 | 7.9 |
| Total votes | | 31,052 | 100.0 |
General election
| Democratic | Cindy Ryu (incumbent) | 50,061 | 75.8 |
| Republican | Alvin Rutledge | 15,950 | 24.2 |
| Total votes | | 66,011 | 100.0 |
| Democratic hold | | | |

Washington's 32nd legislative district House 2 election, 2016
Primary election
| Party | Candidate | Votes | % |
|---|---|---|---|
| Democratic | Ruth Kagi (incumbent) | 20,221 | 64.7 |
| Republican | David D. Schirle | 6,946 | 22.2 |
| Democratic | Wesley Irwin | 3,186 | 10.2 |
| Libertarian | Alex Hart | 879 | 2.8 |
| Total votes | | 31,052 | 100.0 |
General election
| Democratic | Ruth Kagi (incumbent) | 47,908 | 72.6 |
| Republican | David D. Schirle | 18,115 | 27.4 |
| Total votes | | 66,023 | 100.0 |
| Democratic hold | | | |

=== District 33 ===
Washington's 33rd legislative district House 1 election, 2016
Primary election
| Party | Candidate | Votes | % |
|---|---|---|---|
| Democratic | Tina Orwall (incumbent) | 14,207 | 68.6 |
| Republican | John Potter | 5,616 | 27.1 |
| Libertarian | Charles Schaefer | 897 | 4.3 |
| Total votes | | 20,720 | 100.0 |
General election
| Democratic | Tina Orwall (incumbent) | 33,312 | 70.0 |
| Republican | John Potter | 14,257 | 30.0 |
| Total votes | | 47,569 | 100.0 |
| Democratic hold | | | |

Washington's 33rd legislative district House 2 election, 2016
Primary election
| Party | Candidate | Votes | % |
|---|---|---|---|
| Democratic | Mia Su-Ling Gregerson (incumbent) | 13,098 | 64.3 |
| Republican | Pamela Pollock | 7,267 | 35.7 |
| Total votes | | 20,365 | 100.0 |
General election
| Democratic | Mia Su-Ling Gregerson (incumbent) | 30,837 | 65.4 |
| Republican | Pamela Pollock | 16,303 | 33.6 |
| Total votes | | 47,140 | 100.0 |
| Democratic hold | | | |

=== District 34 ===
Washington's 34th legislative district House 1 election, 2016
Primary election
| Party | Candidate | Votes | % |
|---|---|---|---|
| Democratic | Eileen Cody (incumbent) | 26,189 | 73.2 |
| Republican | Matthew Benson | 5,767 | 16.1 |
| Democratic | Brendan B. Kolding | 3,830 | 10.7 |
| Total votes | | 35,786 | 100.0 |
General election
| Democratic | Eileen Cody (incumbent) | 58,754 | 80.6 |
| Republican | Matthew Benson | 14,126 | 19.4 |
| Total votes | | 72,880 | 100.0 |
| Democratic hold | | | |

Washington's 34th legislative district House 2 election, 2016
Primary election
| Party | Candidate | Votes | % |
|---|---|---|---|
| Democratic | Joe Fitzgibbon (incumbent) | 28,967 | 81.0 |
| Republican | Andrew Pilloud | 6,804 | 19.0 |
| Total votes | | 35,771 | 100.0 |
General election
| Democratic | Joe Fitzgibbon (incumbent) | 57,954 | 79.8 |
| Republican | Andrew Pilloud | 14,714 | 20.2 |
| Total votes | | 72,668 | 100.0 |
| Democratic hold | | | |

=== District 35 ===
Washington's 35th legislative district House 1 election, 2016
Primary election
| Party | Candidate | Votes | % |
|---|---|---|---|
| Republican | Dan Griffey (incumbent) | 17,267 | 54.4 |
| Democratic | Irene Bowling | 14,442 | 45.6 |
| Total votes | | 31,709 | 100.0 |
General election
| Republican | Dan Griffey (incumbent) | 36,235 | 55.0 |
| Democratic | Irene Bowling | 29,658 | 45.0 |
| Total votes | | 65,893 | 100.0 |
| Republican hold | | | |

Washington's 35th legislative district House 2 election, 2016
Primary election
| Party | Candidate | Votes | % |
|---|---|---|---|
| Republican | Drew C. MacEwen (incumbent) | 16,774 | 53.8 |
| Democratic | Craig Patti | 14,403 | 46.2 |
| Total votes | | 31,177 | 100.0 |
General election
| Republican | Drew C. MacEwen (incumbent) | 35,384 | 54.2 |
| Democratic | Craig Patti | 29,888 | 45.8 |
| Total votes | | 65,272 | 100.0 |
| Republican hold | | | |

=== District 36 ===
Washington's 36th legislative district House 1 election, 2016
Primary election
| Party | Candidate | Votes | % |
|---|---|---|---|
| Democratic | Noel Christina Frame (incumbent) | 33,154 | 100.0 |
General election
| Democratic | Noel Christina Frame (incumbent) | 71,028 | 100.0 |
| Democratic hold | | | |

Washington's 36th legislative district House 2 election, 2016
Primary election
| Party | Candidate | Votes | % |
|---|---|---|---|
| Democratic | Gael Tarleton (incumbent) | 33,330 | 100.0 |
General election
| Democratic | Gael Tarleton (incumbent) | 70,492 | 100.0 |
| Democratic hold | | | |

=== District 37 ===
Washington's 37th legislative district House 1 election, 2016
Primary election
| Party | Candidate | Votes | % |
|---|---|---|---|
| Democratic | Sharon Tomiko Santos (incumbent) | 27,183 | 93.2 |
| Independent | John Dickinson | 1,999 | 6.8 |
| Total votes | | 29,182 | 100.0 |
General election
| Democratic | Sharon Tomiko Santos (incumbent) | 57,092 | 90.9 |
| Independent | John Dickinson | 5,709 | 9.1 |
| Total votes | | 62,801 | 100.0 |
| Democratic hold | | | |

Washington's 37th legislative district House 2 election, 2016
Primary election
| Party | Candidate | Votes | % |
|---|---|---|---|
| Democratic | Eric Pettigrew (incumbent) | 26,097 | 89.3 |
| Independent | Tamra Smilanich | 3,125 | 10.7 |
| Total votes | | 29,222 | 100.0 |
General election
| Democratic | Eric Pettigrew (incumbent) | 53,597 | 86.4 |
| Independent | Tamra Smilanich | 8,406 | 13.6 |
| Total votes | | 62,003 | 100.0 |
| Democratic hold | | | |

=== District 38 ===
Washington's 38th legislative district House 1 election, 2016
Primary election
| Party | Candidate | Votes | % |
|---|---|---|---|
| Democratic | June Robinson (incumbent) | 16,294 | 100.0 |
General election
| Democratic | June Robinson (incumbent) | 41,895 | 100.0 |
| Democratic hold | | | |

Washington's 38th legislative district House 2 election, 2016
Primary election
| Party | Candidate | Votes | % |
|---|---|---|---|
| Democratic | Mike Sells (incumbent) | 14,227 | 69.2 |
| Independent | Bert Johnson | 6,329 | 30.8 |
| Total votes | | 20,556 | 100.0 |
General election
| Democratic | Mike Sells (incumbent) | 31,672 | 62.4 |
| Independent | Bert Johnson | 19,129 | 37.6 |
| Total votes | | 50,801 | 100.0 |
| Democratic hold | | | |

=== District 39 ===
Washington's 39th legislative district House 1 election, 2016
Primary election
| Party | Candidate | Votes | % |
|---|---|---|---|
| Republican | Dan Kristiansen (incumbent) | 15,334 | 59.6 |
| Democratic | Linda M. Wright | 10,383 | 40.4 |
| Total votes | | 25,717 | 100.0 |
General election
| Republican | Dan Kristiansen (incumbent) | 37,503 | 61.7 |
| Democratic | Linda M. Wright | 23,306 | 38.3 |
| Total votes | | 60,809 | 100 |
| Republican hold | | | |

Washington's 39th legislative district House 2 election, 2016
Primary election
| Party | Candidate | Votes | % |
|---|---|---|---|
| Republican | John Koster | 14,821 | 57.1 |
| Democratic | Ronda Metcalf | 9,920 | 38.2 |
| Libertarian | Shane Driscoll | 1,220 | 4.7 |
| Total votes | | 25,961 | 100.0 |
General election
| Republican | John Koster | 37,250 | 61.0 |
| Democratic | Ronda Metcalf | 23,854 | 39.0 |
| Total votes | | 61,104 | 100 |
| Republican hold | | | |

=== District 40 ===
Washington's 40th legislative district House 1 election, 2016
Primary election
| Party | Candidate | Votes | % |
|---|---|---|---|
| Democratic | Kristine Lytton (incumbent) | 22,955 | 100.0 |
General election
| Democratic | Kristine Lytton (incumbent) | 53,429 | 100.0 |

Washington's 40th legislative district House 2 election, 2016
Primary election
| Party | Candidate | Votes | % |
|---|---|---|---|
| Democratic | Jeff Morris (incumbent) | 22,430 | 100.0 |
General election
| Democratic | Jeff Morris (incumbent) | 52,376 | 100.0 |
| Democratic hold | | | |

=== District 41 ===
Washington's 41st legislative district House 1 election, 2016
Primary election
| Party | Candidate | Votes | % |
|---|---|---|---|
| Democratic | Tana Senn (incumbent) | 19,436 | 65.1 |
| Republican | John Pass | 10,419 | 34.9 |
| Total votes | | 29,855 | 100.0 |
General election
| Democratic | Tana Senn (incumbent) | 45,092 | 64.5 |
| Republican | John Pass | 24,818 | 35.5 |
| Total votes | | 69,910 | 100.0 |
| Democratic hold | | | |

Washington's 41st legislative district House 2 election, 2016
Primary election
| Party | Candidate | Votes | % |
|---|---|---|---|
| Democratic | Judy Clibborn (incumbent) | 16,533 | 55.2 |
| Republican | Michael Appleby | 9,889 | 33.0 |
| Democratic | William Popp, Sr. | 2,914 | 9.7 |
| Libertarian | Angel Jordan | 636 | 2.1 |
| Total votes | | 29,972 | 100.0 |
General election
| Democratic | Judy Clibborn (incumbent) | 43,077 | 61.7 |
| Republican | Michael Appleby | 26,794 | 38.3 |
| Total votes | | 69,871 | 100.0 |
| Democratic hold | | | |

=== District 42 ===
Washington's 42nd legislative district House 1 election, 2016
Primary election
| Party | Candidate | Votes | % |
|---|---|---|---|
| Republican | Luanne VanWerven (incumbent) | 16,834 | 51.8 |
| Democratic | Sharlaine LaClair | 13,082 | 40.3 |
| Independent | Doug Karlberg | 1,551 | 4.8 |
| Libertarian | Jacob Lamont | 1,023 | 3.1 |
| Total votes | | 32,490 | 100.0 |
General election
| Republican | Luanne VanWerven (incumbent) | 39,184 | 54.6 |
| Democratic | Sharlaine LaClair | 32,565 | 45.4 |
| Total votes | | 71,749 | 100.0 |
| Republican hold | | | |

Washington's 42nd legislative district House 2 election, 2016
Primary election
| Party | Candidate | Votes | % |
|---|---|---|---|
| Republican | Vincent Buys (incumbent) | 17,408 | 54.3 |
| Democratic | Tracy Atwood | 10,867 | 33.9 |
| Independent | Dale Dickson | 3,224 | 10.0 |
| Libertarian | Jerry Burns | 585 | 1.8 |
| Total votes | | 32,084 | 100.0 |
General election
| Republican | Vincent Buys (incumbent) | 41,054 | 57.9 |
| Democratic | Tracy Atwood | 29,853 | 42.1 |
| Total votes | | 70,907 | 100.0 |
| Republican hold | | | |

=== District 43 ===
Washington's 43rd legislative district House 1 election, 2016
Primary election
| Party | Candidate | Votes | % |
|---|---|---|---|
| Democratic | Nicole Macri | 20,180 | 52.4 |
| Democratic | Dan Shih | 9,497 | 24.7 |
| Republican | Zachary Zaerr | 2,326 | 6.0 |
| Democratic | Scott Forbes | 2,247 | 5.8 |
| Democratic | Sameer Ranade | 1,881 | 4.9 |
| Democratic | Marcus Courtney | 1,171 | 3.0 |
| Democratic | Thomas Pitchford | 745 | 1.9 |
| Independent | John Eddy | 455 | 1.2 |
| Total votes | | 38,502 | 100.0 |
General election
| Democratic | Nicole Macri | 49,605 | 65.4 |
| Democratic | Dan Shih | 26,180 | 34.6 |
| Total votes | | 75,785 | 100 |
| Democratic hold | | | |

Washington's 43rd legislative district House 2 election, 2016
Primary election
| Party | Candidate | Votes | % |
|---|---|---|---|
| Democratic | Frank Chopp (incumbent) | 31,930 | 100.0 |
General election
| Democratic | Frank Chopp (incumbent) | 67,403 | 100.0 |
| Democratic hold | | | |

=== District 44 ===
Washington's 44th legislative district House 1 election, 2016
Primary election
| Party | Candidate | Votes | % |
|---|---|---|---|
| Democratic | John Lovick (incumbent) | 14,833 | 50.9 |
| Republican | Janice Huxford | 13,470 | 46.2 |
| Independent | Wilberforce Agyekum | 860 | 2.9 |
| Total votes | | 29,163 | 100.0 |
General election
| Democratic | John Lovick (incumbent) | 36,836 | 52.0 |
| Republican | Janice Huxford | 34,026 | 48.0 |
| Total votes | | 70,862 | 100.0 |
| Democratic hold | | | |

Washington's 44th legislative district House 2 election, 2016
Primary election
| Party | Candidate | Votes | % |
|---|---|---|---|
| Republican | Mark Harmsworth (incumbent) | 14,598 | 51.6 |
| Democratic | Katrina Ondracek | 9,116 | 32.2 |
| Democratic | Kerry Watkins | 2,775 | 9.8 |
| Independent | Chase Endreson | 1,166 | 4.1 |
| Democratic | Morrel James Muller | 634 | 2.2 |
| Total votes | | 28,289 | 100.0 |
General election
| Republican | Mark Harmsworth (incumbent) | 38,138 | 54.5 |
| Democratic | Katina Ondracek | 31,773 | 45.5 |
| Total votes | | 69,911 | 100.0 |
| Republican hold | | | |

=== District 45 ===
Washington's 45th legislative district House 1 election, 2016
Primary election
| Party | Candidate | Votes | % |
|---|---|---|---|
| Democratic | Roger Goodman (incumbent) | 17,801 | 61.7 |
| Republican | Ramiro Valderrama | 11,035 | 38.3 |
| Total votes | | 28,836 | 100.0 |
General election
| Democratic | Roger Goodman (incumbent) | 42,981 | 61.9 |
| Republican | Ramiro Valderrama | 26,491 | 38.1 |
| Total votes | | 69,472 | 100.0 |
| Democratic hold | | | |

Washington's 45th legislative district House 2 election, 2016
Primary election
| Party | Candidate | Votes | % |
|---|---|---|---|
| Democratic | Larry Springer (incumbent) | 21,017 | 100.0 |
General election
| Democratic | Larry Springer (incumbent) | 53,018 | 100.0 |
| Democratic hold | | | |

=== District 46 ===
Washington's 46th legislative district House 1 election, 2016
Primary election
| Party | Candidate | Votes | % |
|---|---|---|---|
| Democratic | Gerry Pollet (incumbent) | 33,327 | 88.2 |
| Libertarian | Stephanie Heart Viskovich | 4,479 | 11.8 |
| Total votes | | 37,806 | 100.0 |
General election
| Democratic | Gerry Pollet (incumbent) | 63,831 | 84.9 |
| Libertarian | Stephanie Heart Viskovich | 11,371 | 15.1 |
| Total votes | | 75,202 | 100.0 |
| Democratic hold | | | |

Washington's 46th legislative district House 2 election, 2016
Primary election
| Party | Candidate | Votes | % |
|---|---|---|---|
| Democratic | Jessyn Farrell (incumbent) | 32,170 | 100.0 |
General election
| Democratic | Jessyn Farrell (incumbent) | 63,887 | 100.0 |
| Democratic hold | | | |

=== District 47 ===
Washington's 47th legislative district House 1 election, 2016
Primary election
| Party | Candidate | Votes | % |
|---|---|---|---|
| Republican | Mark Hargrove (incumbent) | 13,050 | 58.3 |
| Democratic | Brooke Valentine | 9,342 | 41.7 |
| Total votes | | 22,392 | 100.0 |
General election
| Republican | Mark Hargrove (incumbent) | 31,327 | 57.1 |
| Democratic | Brooke Valentine | 23,556 | 42.9 |
| Total votes | | 54,883 | 100.0 |
| Republican hold | | | |

Washington's 47th legislative district House 2 election, 2016
Primary election
| Party | Candidate | Votes | % |
|---|---|---|---|
| Democratic | Pat Sullivan (incumbent) | 12,692 | 56.5 |
| Republican | Barry Knowles | 9,790 | 43.5 |
| Total votes | | 22,482 | 100.0 |
General election
| Democratic | Pat Sullivan (incumbent) | 31,858 | 58.0 |
| Republican | Barry Knowles | 23,056 | 42.0 |
| Total votes | | 54,914 | 100 |
| Democratic hold | | | |

=== District 48 ===
Washington's 48th legislative district House 1 election, 2016
Primary election
| Party | Candidate | Votes | % |
|---|---|---|---|
| Democratic | Patty Kuderer | 17,504 | 74.1 |
| Libertarian | Michelle Darnell | 6,117 | 25.9 |
| Total votes | | 23,621 | 100.0 |
General election
| Democratic | Patty Kuderer | 39,472 | 70.1 |
| Libertarian | Michelle Darnell | 16,824 | 29.9 |
| Total votes | | 56,296 | 100.0 |
| Democratic hold | | | |

Washington's 48th legislative district House 2 election, 2016
Primary election
| Party | Candidate | Votes | % |
|---|---|---|---|
| Democratic | Joan McBride (incumbent) | 18,157 | 77.6 |
| Libertarian | Benjamin Judah Phelps | 5,254 | 22.4 |
| Total votes | | 23,411 | 100.0 |
General election
| Democratic | Joan McBride (incumbent) | 40,633 | 72.6 |
| Libertarian | Benjamin Judah Phelps | 15,302 | 27.4 |
| Total votes | | 55,935 | 100.0 |
| Democratic hold | | | |

=== District 49 ===
Washington's 49th legislative district House 1 election, 2016
Primary election
| Party | Candidate | Votes | % |
|---|---|---|---|
| Democratic | Sharon Wylie (incumbent) | 13,823 | 75.9 |
| Democratic | Kaitlyn Beck | 4,381 | 24.1 |
| Total votes | | 18,204 | 100.0 |
General election
| Democratic | Sharon Wylie (incumbent) | 34,762 | 72.2 |
| Democratic | Kaitlyn Beck | 13,381 | 27.8 |
| Total votes | | 48,143 | 100 |
| Democratic hold | | | |

Washington's 49th legislative district House 2 election, 2016
Primary election
| Party | Candidate | Votes | % |
|---|---|---|---|
| Democratic | Monica Jurado Stonier | 8,367 | 37.0 |
| Democratic | Alishia Topper | 6,314 | 28.0 |
| Republican | Carolyn Crain | 4,175 | 18.5 |
| Republican | Wade McLaren | 3,738 | 16.5 |
| Total votes | | 22,594 | 100.0 |
General election
| Democratic | Monica Jurado Stonier | 26,745 | 55.1 |
| Democratic | Alishia Topper | 21,756 | 44.9 |
| Total votes | | 48,501 | 100.0 |
| Democratic hold | | | |
