= Jim Ferrell =

2nd Mayor of Federal Way

2nd Mayor of Federal Way, Washington
- Incumbent
- Assumed office January 1, 2014
- Preceded by: Skip Priest

Federal Way City Council, Position No. 1
- In office January 1, 2004 – December 31, 2013
- Preceded by: Mary Gates
- Succeeded by: Lydia Assefa-Dawson

Personal details
- Born: James Allen Ferrell; September 15, 1966 (age 60) Federal Way, Washington, U.S.
- Party: Democratic (April 2012–present); Republican (before April 2012)
- Spouse: Wendy Caroline (Killian) Ferrell
- Children: 1
- Education: University of Washington (BA); Gonzaga University School of Law (JD)

James Allen Ferrell (born September 15, 1966) is an American lawyer and politician serving in his third term as the Mayor of Federal Way, Washington since 2014. The Mayor is a non-partisan office holder. Ferrell previously served ten years on the Federal Way City Council and was the prime mover behind the city's transition from a Council–Manager form of city government to a Mayor-Council or "Strong Mayor" government. Federal Way is currently the 9th largest city in the state of Washington. with a population of 101,300 residents. In the 2022 general election, Ferrell ran for the King County Prosecuting Attorney position losing to Leesa Manion, the first woman and Korean American King County Prosecutor.

== Personal background ==
Jim Ferrell grew up in Federal Way until the age of nine when his father died. After his father's death, he, his mother, his twin brother, Jeff Ferrell (news anchor and reporter for KSLA 12 in Shreveport, LA) and his older brother and sister moved to Yelm, Washington. Jim Ferrell graduated from Yelm High School in 1985 as a multi-sport athlete and student body president. After high school, Ferrell attended the University of Washington and walked on, as an outside linebacker, to the Washington Huskies football team, then led by Hall of Fame head coach Don James. Ferrell spent four seasons (1985–88) on the team, receiving the 1986 Brian Stapp Memorial Award for the most inspirational non-letterman, earning the 1988 Bob Jarvis Award for most inspirational walk-on player, and was chosen by his fellow players in 1988 to win the prestigious Guy Flaherty Medal for the team's most inspirational player, despite being primarily a scout team player for all four seasons. After graduating in 1989 from the University of Washington with a Bachelor of Arts (B.A.) in political science, Ferrell attended the Gonzaga University School of Law and graduated with a Juris Doctor degree (J.D.) in 1993.

Jim Ferrell lives in Federal Way with his wife, Wendy, and their son.

== Professional background ==
While in law school, Ferrell was a White House intern during the presidency of George H. W. Bush and worked as a legislative assistant for State Senators Pete von Reichbauer and Ray Schow; both of whom represented Washington's 30th legislative district, which includes the entirety of Federal Way. During this period, Jim Ferrell was nearly appointed to the Washington State Senate, finishing second behind Schow to fill the seat left vacant after von Reichbauer's election to the King County Council.

After receiving his J.D., Ferrell began his career as a prosecutor for the City of Renton, Washington before moving onto the King County Prosecuting Attorney's Office in 1998. That same year Ferrell won an award from the King County Sheriff's Office for performing life-saving CPR on a fellow prosecutor and, in 2003, won an award for chasing down on foot and apprehending a defendant who had fled a courtroom. In 2000, Ferrell became the supervisor of King County's newly created domestic violence court and later (2005–07) served two terms as the president of the King County Prosecuting Attorneys Union. Similar to his near appointment to the State Senate, Ferrell in 2007 finished second behind Dan Satterberg to be appointed as King County Prosecuting Attorney to fill the position following the death of Norm Maleng. Jim Ferrell had risen to the position of King County Senior Deputy Prosecuting Attorney before resigning on December 31, 2013 to take the position of mayor of Federal Way.

== Political career ==
In 2002, Jim Ferrell challenged the 30th Legislative District's (then) two-term incumbent socially conservative Democratic Washington State Representative Mark Miloscia. Miloscia ended up winning the election by more than 11 percentage points. The following year, Ferrell took on incumbent Federal Way City Councilmember Mary Gates, who had been a city councilmember since Federal Way was incorporated in 1990. Ultimately, Ferrell defeated Gates by nearly 5 percentage points. In his two subsequent city council reelection races in 2007 and 2011, Ferrell did not face any opposition.

One of Ferrell's prime initiatives while on the city council was a successful transition to making Federal Way Municipal Court judges elected, instead of appointed. Analogous to this interest in having public accountability for officials, Jim Ferrell supported the February 2008 ballot initiative to transition from a Council–Manager form of city government to a Mayor-Council or "Strong Mayor" government. The initiative failed by about 10 percentage points. The following year, Ferrell spearheaded a second effort to make the same transition in city government. This initiative, on its second attempt, passed by about 3 percentage points on the 2009 General Election ballot.

During the campaign to change the city's form of government, Ferrell made clear that he would run for the office of mayor if the initiative proved successful. Later, State Representative Skip Priest, City Councilmember Mike Park, and City Councilmember (and future State Representative) Linda Kochmar also joined the race to become the city's first elected mayor. His campaign focused on opposition to the proposed skyscraper development in the city's downtown, skepticism of the proposed performing arts center, and a focus on public safety. In the primary election, Ferrell and Priest finished as the top-two vote-getters meaning they would face-off in the general election. Ultimately, Skip Priest won the general election by about 4 percentage points. The proposed skyscraper plan, which was a major talking point during the campaign, died three months after the election when the developers could not pay an initial $100,000 to the city on the proposed $350 million project.

In April 2012, five months following Ferrell's election to a third term to the Federal City Council, he announced that he would be switching parties; from the Republican party to the Democratic party. In his column explaining his decision, Ferrell said it was motivated by what he saw as a move by the Republican party to more far-right tone and reactionary policies. Chief among his concerns were that the Republican party appeared to him to take neither global climate change nor a 21st-century approach to energy policy seriously. Also concerning Ferrell was what he saw as the Republican party's continued preference toward tax cuts for the rich instead of policies to mitigate the jobs lost and lives upended following the Great Recession of 2008.

On May 6, 2013, Jim Ferrell announced his candidacy for Federal Way's mayor in the 2013 election, in what turned out to be a rematch of the 2010 contest between himself and (then) Mayor Skip Priest. In addition to similar themes heard during the 2010 election, Ferrell was also critical of Priest's cuts in the city's workforce, particularly its police force, during his term in office, as well as his advocacy for legislation that would have dismantled Sound Transit. Public safety was of particular interest during the election due to the 2013 mass shooting at Federal Way's Pinewood Village apartment complex that left five dead, in addition to a 24% increase in burglaries and a 12% increase in auto thefts in the city in 2012. The rematch of the 2010 election resulted in the unseating of the incumbent mayor with Ferrell prevailing with more than 55% of the vote.

=== Mayor of Federal Way ===
Jim Ferrell took office as Federal Way's second elected mayor on January 1, 2014. He was re-elected in 2017 and 2021, becoming the first Mayor in Federal Way to serve consecutive terms of office.

His key accomplishments include:

- Creating Town Square Park, a Low Impact Development, described as the “beating heart” of the community
- Developing a balanced and objective financial plan to build the Performing Arts & Event Center
- Building the Town Center Steps, connected Town Square Park, the PAEC, and future development while promoting access and walkability
- Advocating for Light Rail to travel down I-5 to Federal Way, growing economic opportunity, and ensuring downtown redevelopment through Transit Oriented Development
- Converting to LED streetlights and beginning Federal Way’s conversion to an electric vehicle fleet
- Withdrawing from the SCORE Jail System, saving the City more than $4 million
- Deploying increased resources to keep neighborhoods safe from graffiti and chronic distressed properties
- Establishing the City's first African American Black Community Quarterly Meeting
- Hiring the City's first Diversity Equity and Inclusion Manager
- Securing the donation of the historical Brooklake Community Center property to the parks department
- Dedicating Downtown’s 60-foot flagpole and designating Veterans Way
- Issuing a city proclamation for Black Lives Matter and raising the Juneteenth flag
- Saving public health services for more than 13,000 low-income women and their children
- Creating a structurally balanced 2021-2022 budget
- Supporting small businesses during the pandemic by signing more than half a million dollars' worth of CARES Act Grants
- Convening the Mayor’s Homelessness Task Force and acting on recommendations to help create the Pete Anderson FUSION Family Center, helping serve over one hundred families in need per year
- Ensuring greater oversight of the Federal Way Police Department, discontinuing use of chokeholds, and working toward a body camera program
- Creating the Shop Local Federal Way website to help support Federal Way businesses by encouraging residents to shop local. It is also a great directory of businesses in Federal Way.

=== King County Prosecuting Attorney campaign ===
On January 7, 2022, the day that King County Prosecuting Attorney Dan Satterberg announced his retirement, Ferrell filed paperwork to run for the office. He formally launched a campaign (www.jimferrell.org) for the office on January 27. He lost the general election.

== Electoral history ==
Federal Way Mayor, General Election 2017
| Party | Candidate | Votes | % | ±% |
|---|---|---|---|---|
| Nonpartisan | Jim Ferrell (Incumbent) | 9,244 | 61.82 | |
| Nonpartisan | Susan Honda | 5,709 | 38.18 | |

Federal Way Mayor, General Election 2013
| Party | Candidate | Votes | % | ±% |
|---|---|---|---|---|
| Nonpartisan | Jim Ferrell | 8,299 | 55.15 | +7.17 |
| Nonpartisan | Skip Priest (Incumbent) | 6,749 | 44.85 | −7.17 |

Federal Way City Council, Position No. 1, General Election 2011
| Party | Candidate | Votes | % | ±% |
|---|---|---|---|---|
| Nonpartisan | Jim Ferrell (Incumbent) | 13,097 | 100.00 | 0.00 |

Federal Way Mayor, General Election 2010
| Party | Candidate | Votes | % | ±% |
|---|---|---|---|---|
| Nonpartisan | Skip Priest | 12,315 | 52.02 | |
| Nonpartisan | Jim Ferrell | 11,360 | 47.98 | |

Federal Way Mayor, Primary Election 2010
| Party | Candidate | Votes | % | ±% |
|---|---|---|---|---|
| Nonpartisan | Skip Priest | 5,110 | 35.70 | |
| Nonpartisan | Jim Ferrell | 3,991 | 27.89 | |
| Nonpartisan | Linda Kochmar | 2,650 | 18.52 | |
| Nonpartisan | Mike Park | 2,561 | 17.89 | |

Federal Way City Council, Position No. 1, General Election 2007
| Party | Candidate | Votes | % | ±% |
|---|---|---|---|---|
| Nonpartisan | Jim Ferrell (Incumbent) | 11,049 | 100.00 | +47.63 |

Federal Way City Council, Position No. 1, General Election 2003
| Party | Candidate | Votes | % | ±% |
|---|---|---|---|---|
| Nonpartisan | Jim Ferrell | 5,988 | 52.37 | |
| Nonpartisan | Mary Gates (Incumbent) | 5,445 | 47.63 | −52.37 |

Washington's 30th legislative district State Representative, Pos. 1, General Election 2002
| Party | Candidate | Votes | % | ±% |
|---|---|---|---|---|
| Democratic | Mark Miloscia (Incumbent) | 15,870 | 55.91 | −1.82 |
| Republican | Jim Ferrell | 12,513 | 44.09 | |

Washington's 30th legislative district State Representative, Pos. 1, Primary Election 2002
| Party | Candidate | Votes | % | ±% |
|---|---|---|---|---|
| Democratic | Mark Miloscia (Incumbent) | 8,622 | 54.52 | |
| Republican | Jim Ferrell | 7,193 | 45.48 | |
