= Carol Gregory =

American educator and politician

Member of the Washington House of Representatives from the 30th district
- In office January 8, 2015 – November 25, 2015
- Preceded by: Roger Freeman
- Succeeded by: Teri Hickel

Personal details
- Born: Carol Jean Landerholm; November 10, 1943 (age 82) Vancouver, Washington, U.S.
- Party: Democratic
- Education: University of Washington (BA)

Carol Jean Gregory (née Landerholm; born November 10, 1943) is an American educator and politician of the Democratic Party. Gregory was appointed to the Washington House of Representatives by Governor Jay Inslee on January 8, 2015 to the vacant state representative seat in the 30th Legislative District left after the death of Representative Roger Freeman on October 29, 2014. She was appointed on January 8, 2015 and sworn in on January 12, 2015.

== Early life and education ==
Gregory was born in Vancouver, Washington. She earned an Associate degree from Clark College and Bachelor of Arts from the University of Washington.

== Career ==
Prior to her political career, Gregory was the director of BuRSST for Prosperity, a nonprofit association which works to elevate people out of poverty. She served as president of the Washington Education Association teachers' union from 1975–1981, and president of the Washington chapter of women's rights group NARAL.

=== Washington House ===
After two unsuccessful campaigns to represent the 30th District in the Legislature in 2008 and 2010, Gregory was invited to run in 2013 for School Board against parochial school principal Medgar Wells, which was successful. A month after the election, she was selected by the Board as School Board President, but stepped down in 2015 after being nominated to replace Rep. Roger Freeman, who died days before winning re-election. She retains her position on the Federal Way School Board, while the role of board president moved to Geoffery McAnalloy.

State law in Washington allows the political party that officially nominated a legislator of a legislative district to nominate three replacements for a vacancy in that legislator's position. Freeman's death near the end of the 2014 election cycle was the first such instance since the state's "top-two" primary system, which replaced the traditional party primary system. On December 1, 2014, the Washington State Democrats held a nominating convention of 30th District party members in Federal Way, which selected, in order of descending priority: Gregory, local party official Richard Champion, and unsuccessful 2014 State Senate candidate Shari Song as nominees. Under the law, the municipal County Councils of the county or counties in which the legislative district lies shall vote on which the three nominees shall fill the vacancy. The King County Council voted on December 8, 2014 to select Carol Gregory. However, the Pierce County Council objected to the King County vote, to which it was not party, arguing that the vote must be done by both County Councils at a combined assembly, while King County disagreed. Pierce County refused to hold their own vote, demanding that King County arrange a combined meeting. The impasse was resolved on January 8, 2015, when the responsibility then passed to Governor Jay Inslee, who selected Gregory.

In the case of vacancies filled before the middle of an electoral term, the appointment must be confirmed via an off-year mid-term election. In early 2015, Federal Way City Council member and political consultant Martin Moore, who had served as legislative aide to Freeman and previously a Democrat, announced his intention to run for the position as a Republican. Moore withdrew from the race after local Chamber of Commerce official Teri Hickel announced her candidacy, also as a Republican. Due to state laws preventing state legislators from campaigning while the legislature is in session, Gregory was left at a disadvantage after the State Legislature went into two special sessions over state budget battles, particularly in light of McCleary v Washington regarding state education funding, during which time Gregory's campaign was unable to raise or spend money outside of a few days between sessions. Hickel beat Gregory in the 2015 August top-two primary by 2.5 percentage points in an election.

== Electoral history ==
Washington's 30th Legislative District State Representative, Pos. 2, General Election 2015
Party	Candidate	Votes	%	±%
Republican	Teri Hickel	12,652	54.81	
Democratic	Carol Gregory (Appointed Incumbent)	10,431	45.19	

Washington's 30th Legislative District State Representative, Pos. 2, Primary Election 2015
Party	Candidate	Votes	%	±%
Republican	Teri Hickel	7,982	51.74	
Democratic	Carol Gregory (Appointed Incumbent)	7,446	48.26	

Federal Way School District, Director District No. 4, General Election 2013
Party	Candidate	Votes	%	±%
Nonpartisan	Carol Gregory	10,812	52.70	
Nonpartisan	Medgar Wells	9,703	47.30	

Federal Way School District, Director District No. 4, Primary Election 2013
Party	Candidate	Votes	%	±%
Nonpartisan	Carol Gregory	6,122	44.19	
Nonpartisan	Medgar Wells	5,299	38.25	
Nonpartisan	Kenneth Lance Barton	2,432	17.56	

Washington's 30th Legislative District State Representative, Pos. 2, General Election 2010
Party	Candidate	Votes	%	±%
Republican	Katrina Asay	19,130	50.40	
Democratic	Carol Gregory	18,829	49.60	

Washington's 30th Legislative District State Representative, Pos. 2, Primary Election 2010
Party	Candidate	Votes	%	±%
Democratic	Carol Gregory	9,227	44.01	
Republican	Katrina Asay	5,629	26.85	
Republican	Ed Barney	2,641	12.60	
Republican	Anthony Kalchik	1,832	8.74	
Republican	Jerry Galland	1,636	7.80	

Washington's 30th Legislative District State Representative, Pos. 2, General Election 2008
Party	Candidate	Votes	%	±%
Republican	Skip Priest (Incumbent)	24,154	53.49	−4.99
Democratic	Carol Gregory	21,006	46.51	

Washington's 30th Legislative District State Representative, Pos. 2, Primary Election 2008
Party	Candidate	Votes	%	±%
Republican	Skip Priest (Incumbent)	11,265	59.17	
Democratic	Carol Gregory	7,773	40.83	
