= Hickel =

Hickel is a surname. Notable people with the surname include:

- Anton Hickel (1745–1798), Austrian painter
- Ermalee Hickel (1925–2017), American philanthropist, wife of Wally Hickel
- Hal Hickel, American Academy Award-winning visual effects animator for Industrial Light & Magic
- Jack Hickel (born 1950), American physician and humanitarian, son of Wally and Ermalee Hickel
- Jason Hickel (born 1982), British anthropologist and professor, whose research and writing focuses on economic anthropology and development
- Joseph Hickel (1736-1807), Austrian portraitist and court painter to the Habsburg Holy Roman Emperor Joseph II
- Paul Robert Hickel (1865–1935), French botanist
- Rudolf Hickel (born 1942), German economist and author
- Svenja Hickel (born 1990), German female artistic gymnast
- Teri Hickel (born 1960), American politician, wife of Tim Hickel
- Tim Hickel (born 1960), American lawyer and politician, husband of Teri Hickel
- Walter Joseph Hickel a.k.a Wally Hickel (1919–2010), American businessman, real estate developer, and politician, former Governor of Alaska and U.S. Secretary of the Interior
- Zoe Hickel (born 1992), American women's ice hockey player
