= Mark Miloscia =

American politician from Washington

Member of the Washington Senate from the 30th district
- In office January 12, 2015 – January 14, 2019
- Preceded by: Tracey Eide
- Succeeded by: Claire Wilson

Member of the Washington House of Representatives from the 30th district
- In office January 11, 1999 – January 14, 2013
- Preceded by: Tim Hickel
- Succeeded by: Linda Kochmar

Personal details
- Born: Mark Anthony Miloscia; September 13, 1958 (age 68) Biloxi, Mississippi, U.S.
- Party: Democratic (before 2014); Republican (2014–present)
- Spouse: Meschell Miloscia
- Education: United States Air Force Academy (BS); University of North Dakota (MBA); Chapman University (MA)
- Website: State Senate website

Military service
- Allegiance: United States
- Branch/service: United States Air Force
- Years of service: 1980–1990
- Rank: Captain

Mark Anthony Miloscia (born September 13, 1958) is an American politician and former public school teacher who served in the Washington State Senate from 2015 to 2019. A Democrat for more than twenty years, in 2014 he switched to the Republican Party and ran for election to represent the 30th Legislative District in the state senate - winning by more than ten percentage points. In 2016, Miloscia ran for state auditor as a Republican, but lost general election to Democrat Pat McCarthy by five percentage points. He represented the 30th legislative district for seven terms, from 1999 to 2013, in the Washington House of Representatives.

== Personal life ==
Miloscia was born in Biloxi, Mississippi, and lived there until the age of six when his family moved to New York City. He lived with his family in New York City until graduating from Francis Lewis High School.

He is a retired officer of the United States Air Force. He was a B-52 pilot and a contract manager for the Air Force for 10 years. He holds a Bachelor of Science in Engineering from the United States Air Force Academy, a Master of Arts (MA) degree from Chapman University in clinical psychology, and a Master of Business Administration (MBA) degree from the University of North Dakota. He has also completed the Leadership Program at the Taubman Center for State and Local Government at John F. Kennedy School of Government at Harvard University.

He has resided in Auburn, Washington, and then Federal Way, Washington with his wife Meschell, his three children, and his grandchildren for the last 25 years.

== Professional career ==
Miloscia is a lobbyist for the Washington State Catholic Conference of Bishops. He is a substitute teacher for the Federal Way School District and the Roman Catholic Archdiocese of Seattle. He has also worked as the industrial services director for Goodwill Industries in Tacoma, the executive director of Federal Way Youth and Family Services, and as a commissioner for the Lakehaven Utility District.

As of 2013 he sits on the board of directors for the Federal Way Boys and Girls Club, is a member of St. Vincent's Knights of Columbus, and is a member of the Federal Way Chamber of Commerce.

In 2018 he became the executive director of the Family Policy Institute of Washington until 2022.

== Political career ==
Miloscia served seven terms in the Washington State House of Representatives as a Democrat. He was elected in 1998 from the 30th Legislative District, an area that includes Federal Way, Algona, and portions of Auburn, Pacific, Milton, and Des Moines.

On September 15, 2011, Miloscia announced his candidacy to run as a Democrat to replace retiring Washington State Auditor Brian Sonntag. Miloscia came under fire within his own party for his conservative positions on abortion and same-sex marriage, and he failed to receive its nomination. Miloscia was not among the top-two vote-getters in Washington's blanket primary system, garnering less than 10% of the vote, and thus did not appear on the November general election ballot. Fellow Democratic State Representative Troy Kelley was elected as state auditor in November 2012. Miloscia's seat in the legislature was won by Republican Federal Way City Councilperson Linda Kochmar.

While serving as a representative, Miloscia worked as a substitute teacher when the legislature was not in session. As of March 2014, Miloscia announced his candidacy for State Senate in the 30th Legislative District as a Republican.

On March 6, 2014, Miloscia switched to the Republican Party when he announced his candidacy for the State Senate in the 30th Legislative District in 2014 - an election he ultimately won by more than 11 points.

Miloscia ran for Washington secretary of state in the 2022 special election. Miloscia has doubted the legitimacy of the 2020 presidential election.

== Awards ==
- 2017: Third Class of the Order of Merit of Ukraine

== Electoral history ==
Washington's 30th Legislative District State Senator, General Election 2018
Party	Candidate	Votes	%	±%
Democratic	Claire Wilson	25,505	54.24	
Republican	Mark Miloscia	21,517	45.76	

Washington's 30th Legislative District State Senator, Primary Election 2018
Party	Candidate	Votes	%	±%
Republican	Mark Miloscia	12,332	48.06	
Democratic	Claire Wilson	9,833	38.32	
Democratic	Tirzah Idahosa	3,495	13.62	

Washington State Auditor, General Election 2016
Party	Candidate	Votes	%	±%
Democratic	Pat McCarthy	1,597,011	52.31	
Republican	Mark Miloscia	1,455,771	47.69	

Washington State Auditor, Primary Election 2016
Party	Candidate	Votes	%	±%
Republican	Mark Miloscia	481,910	36.71	+26.94
Democratic	Pat McCarthy	381,828	29.09	
Democratic	Jeff Sprung	314,290	23.94	
Independent	Mark Wilson	96,972	7.39	
No Party Preference	David Golden	37,727	2.87	

Washington's 30th Legislative District State Senator, General Election 2014
Party	Candidate	Votes	%	±%
Republican	Mark Miloscia	17,266	55.60	
Democratic	Shari Song	13,790	44.40	

Washington's 30th Legislative District State Senator, Primary Election 2014
Party	Candidate	Votes	%	±%
Republican	Mark Miloscia	10,553	56.90	
Democratic	Shari Song	7,993	43.10	

Washington State Auditor, Primary Election 2012
Party	Candidate	Votes	%	±%
Republican	James Watkins	584,444	46.09	
Democratic	Troy Kelley	291,335	22.98	
Democratic	Craig Pridemore	268,220	21.15	
Democratic	Mark Miloscia	123,936	9.77	

Washington's 30th Legislative District State Representative, Pos. 1, General Election 2010
Party	Candidate	Votes	%	±%
Democratic	Mark Miloscia (Incumbent)	22,726	59.50	−7.99
Republican	Shawn Sullivan	15,466	40.50	

Washington's 30th Legislative District State Representative, Pos. 1, Primary Election 2010
Party	Candidate	Votes	%	±%
Democratic	Mark Miloscia (Incumbent)	12,261	57.57	
Republican	Shawn Sullivan	9,038	42.43	

Washington's 30th Legislative District State Representative, Pos. 1, General Election 2008
Party	Candidate	Votes	%	±%
Democratic	Mark Miloscia (Incumbent)	29,999	67.49	+1.52
Republican	Michael Thompson	14,453	32.51	

Washington's 30th Legislative District State Representative, Pos. 1, Primary Election 2008
Party	Candidate	Votes	%	±%
Democratic	Mark Miloscia (Incumbent)	12,307	65.18	
Republican	Michael Thompson	6,575	34.82	

Washington's 30th Legislative District State Representative, Pos. 1, General Election 2006
Party	Candidate	Votes	%	±%
Democratic	Mark Miloscia (Incumbent)	20,080	65.97	+10.38
Republican	Anatoly Kalchik	10,358	34.03	

Washington's 30th Legislative District State Representative, Pos. 1, Primary Election 2006
Party	Candidate	Votes	%	±%
Democratic	Mark Miloscia (Incumbent)	8,217	60.98	
Republican	Anatoly Kalchik	5,259	39.02	

Washington's 30th Legislative District State Representative, Pos. 1, General Election 2004
Party	Candidate	Votes	%	±%
Democratic	Mark Miloscia (Incumbent)	24,815	55.59	−0.32
Republican	William Anthony "Tony" Moore, Jr.	18,743	41.98	
Libertarian	Robert Brengman	1,085	2.43	

Washington's 30th Legislative District State Representative, Pos. 1, Primary Election 2004
Party	Candidate	Votes	%	±%
Democratic	Mark Miloscia (Incumbent)	10,933	59.75	
Republican	William Anthony "Tony" Moore, Jr.	7,142	39.03	
Libertarian	Robert Brengman	224	1.22	

Washington's 30th Legislative District State Representative, Pos. 1, General Election 2002
Party	Candidate	Votes	%	±%
Democratic	Mark Miloscia (Incumbent)	15,870	55.91	−1.82
Republican	Jim Ferrell	12,513	44.09	

Washington's 30th Legislative District State Representative, Pos. 1, Primary Election 2002
Party	Candidate	Votes	%	±%
Democratic	Mark Miloscia (Incumbent)	8,622	54.52	
Republican	Jim Ferrell	7,193	45.48	

Washington's 30th Legislative District State Representative, Pos. 1, General Election 2000
Party	Candidate	Votes	%	±%
Democratic	Mark Miloscia (Incumbent)	24,633	57.73	+2.61
Republican	Tom Pierson	18,036	42.27	

Washington's 30th Legislative District State Representative, Pos. 1, Primary Election 2000
Party	Candidate	Votes	%	±%
Democratic	Mark Miloscia (Incumbent)	12,332	58.15	
Republican	Tom Pierson	6,710	31.64	
Republican	Ed Barney	2,167	10.22	

Washington's 30th Legislative District State Representative, Pos. 1, General Election 1998
Party	Candidate	Votes	%	±%
Democratic	Mark Miloscia	18,984	55.12	
Republican	Skip Priest	15,457	44.88	

Washington's 30th Legislative District State Representative, Pos. 1, Primary Election 1998
Party	Candidate	Votes	%	±%
Democratic	Mark Miloscia	7,317	41.04	
Republican	Skip Priest	5,735	32.17	
Republican	Ann Murphy	4,775	26.79	

Lakehaven Utility District Commissioner, Pos. No. 4, General Election 1995
Party	Candidate	Votes	%	±%
Nonpartisan	Mark Miloscia	6,867	51.82	
Nonpartisan	Cliff Perry	6,385	48.18	

Washington's 30th Legislative District State Senator, Primary Election 1994
Party	Candidate	Votes	%	±%
Republican	Ray Schow (Incumbent)	4,702	31.39	
Democratic	Jean Marie Brough	4,318	28.82	
Republican	Skip Priest	2,896	19.33	
Democratic	Mark Miloscia	2,843	18.98	
Democratic	Ron Alan Weigelt	222	1.48	

Washington's 30th Legislative District State Representative, Pos. 2, General Election 1992
Party	Candidate	Votes	%	±%
Republican	Jean Marie Brough (Incumbent)	21,637	50.45	−10.81
Democratic	Mark Miloscia	21,255	49.55	

Washington's 30th Legislative District State Representative, Pos. 2, Primary Election 1992
Party	Candidate	Votes	%	±%
Republican	Jean Marie Brough (Incumbent)	9,771	52.32	
Democratic	Mark Miloscia	5,092	27.27	
Democratic	Brian T. Epperson	3,812	20.41	
