= Melanie Morgan =

Melanie Morgan may refer to:

- Melanie Morgan (1965–2022), American wife of professional wrestler and professional football player Brian Pillman
- Melanie Morgan (radio personality), American radio reporter and presenter
- Melanie Morgan (politician), American politician from Washington state
