= Tracey Eide =

American politician (born 1954)

Member of the Washington Senate from the 30th district
- In office January 11, 1999 – January 12, 2015
- Preceded by: Ray Schow
- Succeeded by: Mark Miloscia

Member of the Washington House of Representatives from the 30th district
- In office January 11, 1993 – January 9, 1995
- Preceded by: Maryann Mitchell
- Succeeded by: Tim Hickel

Personal details
- Born: July 31, 1954 (age 71) Seattle, Washington, U.S.
- Party: Democratic
- Other political affiliations: Majority Coalition Caucus (2013–2014, affiliate)
- Spouse: Mark

Tracey J. Eide (born July 31, 1954) is a Democratic Party member of the Washington State Senate. She has represented the 30th Washington Legislative District in the Washington State Senate since 1999. Eide has served as the Majority Floor Leader for the Senate since 2005. Earlier in Eide's Senate tenure she served as Majority Whip from 2001 to 2002 and Minority Whip from 2003 to 2004. Currently, Eide serves as vice-chair of the Senate Transportation Committee. Previously, Eide served as Assistant Majority Whip in the Washington State House of Representatives from 1993 to 1995.

Eide is a graduate of the Harvard John F. Kennedy School of Government Program for Senior Executives in State and Local Government. She is a small business owner.

== Committee assignments ==
- Early Learning & K-12 Education Committee
- Rules Committee
- Transportation Committee

== Personal life ==
Eide is married to Mark, a judge. They have two children.
