= BlackPast.org =

Website on African-American history

- Company type: 501(c)(3) nonprofit organization
- Website type: Free online encyclopedia
- Available in: English
- Founded: 2004; 22 years ago
- Headquarters: University of Washington, Seattle, Washington, US
- Country of origin: United States
- Area served: Worldwide
- Founder: Quintard Taylor
- Key people: Quintard Taylor; George Tamblyn; Jamila Taylor
- Services: Information on: African-American history; Afro-Caribbean history; History of people of Sub-Saharan African ancestry
- Employees: 10 plus 600+ volunteer contributors
- Website: blackpast.org
- Commercial: No
- Users: 60 million visits as of 2024
- Current status: Active
- Written in: Drupal
- Awards: National Education Association’s Carter G. Woodson Memorial Award; Washington State Jefferson Award, 2015; James and Janie Washington Foundation Award for Documentation, 2014; The Machine-Assisted Reference Section (MARS) of the Reference and User Services Association Best Free Websites of 2011; Association of King County Historical Organizations Charles Payton Award for Heritage Advocacy, 2011; New York Public Library Best of Reference: Hybrid Print and Electronic Resources, 2009

BlackPast.org is a 501(c)(3) nonprofit web-based reference center that is dedicated primarily to the understanding of African-American history, Afro-Caribbean history, and the history of people of Sub-Saharan African ancestry. In 2011, the American Library Association's Reference and User Services Association included it in its list of the 25 Best Free Reference Websites of the Year. According to BlackPast.org, the website has a global audience of about two million visitors per year from more than 100 nations. In 2009, Canada, Australia, Great Britain, Brazil, and Germany ranked as the top five countries, after the United States, for visitors to the site. A 2008 website review described it as easily navigable and well organized but also as containing omissions among some features and as a work in progress. By 2009, the organization was selected by New York Public Library reference librarians as one of the top 25 hybrid print and electronic resources for the year.

== History ==
BlackPast.org was founded in January 2004 by Quintard Taylor, the Scott and Dorothy Bullitt Professor of American History at the University of Washington. The initial website, designed by his teaching assistant George Tamblyn, was intended primarily as a research aid for students and mainly featured short vignettes of significant people, places and events in African-American history. Under the direction of Taylor's daughter Jamila Taylor, the website was redesigned the following year to incorporate a new architecture and improved navigation features using Dreamweaver, creating the basis for a resource that would serve a larger research audience. In Spring 2005, Taylor received an email from a New Zealand researcher who had accessed the site. This was followed by correspondence from Russian students who had viewed the site. This led to a U.S. State Department-sponsored tour of Russian universities by Taylor.

When it became evident that the site was being used outside of the campus community, additional features were added including a bibliography, timeline, links to related websites, major speeches, digital archives and genealogy sections. With the addition of a Bullitt research assistant and a high school intern, the website staff had grown to five by the end of its second year. In 2006, the website received its first funding when University of Washington History Department Chair John Findlay and the school's Office of Minority Affairs Director Nancy "Rusty" Barceló each agreed to provide $10,000 for website expansion. The seed money was used to hire Grip Media of Portland, Oregon, to design a professional web presence for BlackPast.org. That year, the number of visits received by the site exceeded 150,000, and it recorded 4.4 million hits.

On February 1, 2007, the new Drupal-based website was launched with a small ceremony in the University of Washington History Department. The site opened with approximately 600 entries, 100 speeches, 80 full text primary documents and seven major timelines. New sections that were added included New Perspectives, which featured accounts and descriptions of important but little-known events in African-American history. In 2007, the site surpassed the 455,000 mark in annual visits with more than 12.7 million hits.

More than 600 volunteer historians, scholars and university students have contributed historical entries since the site's inception. In November 2007, BlackPast.org was formed as a non-profit corporation under the laws of the State of Washington. Board members at time of formation were George Tamblyn, Jamila Taylor and Quintard Taylor. On March 28, 2008, with a staff of 10, BlackPast.org was officially recognized as a 501(c)(3) nonprofit corporation. Also that year, the organization received a $10,000 grant from Humanities Washington for project work including photo copyright acquisition.

In 2009, the organization was selected by New York Public Library reference librarians as one of the top 25 hybrid print and electronic resources for the library's Best of Reference list, "an annual list of books, websites, and electronic resources selected by a committee of librarians for their usefulness in branch reference collections." The following year, BlackPast.org was selected by the Library of Congress (LOC) to become part of the LOC's web archiving project, a commitment with the International Internet Preservation Consortium to record a "rich body of Internet content from around the world." (See also National Digital Information Infrastructure and Preservation Program.) That project is currently in the cataloging phase, with the BlackPast.org content available in 2011.

Since the website's inception, all content has been reviewed for accuracy and relevance by Taylor and a team of copyeditors prior to publication. Taylor said in a 2008 interview, "The site is the biggest thing I've ever done as far as its reach and impact," adding: "I've received e-mails from China, Nigeria, South Africa and from the Netherlands. Where we think we have a self-interest in African American history, it's pleasing to me that folks in Russia and Mexico want to know the story. That is what drives me to continue on with this important work of unraveling the history of the African American people."

As of 2025, 27 foundations, organizations, and corporations provide, or have provided, funding for BlackPast.org.

== Content ==
- Transcripts of nearly 200 speeches and more than 100 primary documents, including court decisions, laws, organizational statements, government reports, and executive orders impacting people of African ancestry around the world.
- Nine major timelines forming a chronology of events from 5,000 BCE to the present while five major bibliographies list nearly 4,000 books categorized by author, title, subject, and date of publication.
- Six "gateway" pages with links to digital archive collections, museums, and research centers, genealogical research websites, and more than 500 other website resources on African-American and global African history. Those links include all of the major black newspapers in the United States as well as the most significant newspapers and magazines in Africa and leading periodicals devoted to people of African ancestry in the Caribbean, Europe, and Latin America.
- A section called Perspectives Magazine presents commentary on important but little-known events in black history often written by individuals who participated in or witnessed them.
- Black History Month provides information on the annual celebration of African-American history and culture.
- The Barack Obama Page, which is a reference center for information related to the 44th President of the United States.
- Major Black Officeholders since 1641, which lists hundreds of black officeholders since the American colonial era. This list includes all past and current African-American members of the U.S. Congress as well as other officeholders and political appointees.

== See also ==
- Association for the Study of African American Life and History
- Black History Month
- History of slavery in the United States
- List of museums focused on African Americans
- National Digital Information Infrastructure and Preservation Program
- Schomburg Center for Research in Black Culture
- Timeline of the civil rights movement
