= Schow =

Schow is a surname. Notable people with the surname include:

- David J. Schow (born 1955), American author
- Joseph Schow, Canadian politician
- Niels Rosing-Schow (born 1954), Danish composer
- Keith Schow (1930–1988), Australian rules footballer
- Ray Schow, American politician
