= Jesse Johnson (Washington politician) =

American politician

Member of the Washington House of Representatives from the 30th district
- In office January 13, 2020 – January 9, 2023
- Preceded by: Kristine Reeves
- Succeeded by: Kristine Reeves

Federal Way City Council, Position No. 2
- In office January 1, 2018 – January 13, 2020
- Preceded by: Kelly Maloney
- Succeeded by: Erica Norton

Personal details
- Born: 1989 or 1990 (age 36–37) Kirkland, Washington, U.S.
- Party: Democratic
- Children: 2
- Education: University of Washington (BA, MEd)

Jesse E. Johnson (born 1989) is an American educator, politician, and former member of the Washington House of Representatives.

Johnson represents Washington's 30th legislative district, which encompasses parts of King County and Pierce County. He was appointed to the legislature in January 2020 following the resignation of Representative Kristine Reeves.

Prior to his appointment, Johnson served as the youngest member of the Federal Way, Washington City Council in its history.

Johnson retained his seat and was elected to a full two-year term in November 2020.

In 2022, Johnson announced he would not seek another term in order to focus on his young family, which included a 6-month old and wife in medical school. His term ended in January 2023.

== Electoral history ==
Washington's 30th Legislative District State Representative, Pos. 2, General Election 2020
Party	Candidate	Votes	%	±%
Democratic	Jesse Johnson (Incumbent)	37,941	60.29	
Republican	Jack Walsh	24,948	39.64	
