= Maryann Mitchell =

American politician from Washington

Member of the Washington House of Representatives from the 30th district
- In office January 9, 1995 – December 28, 2002
- Preceded by: Jean Marie Brough
- Succeeded by: Skip Priest
- In office January 14, 1991 – January 11, 1993
- Preceded by: Dick Schoon
- Succeeded by: Tracey Eide

Personal details
- Born: September 25, 1933 Snohomish, Washington, U.S.
- Died: December 28, 2002 (aged 69) Federal Way, Washington, U.S.
- Party: Republican

Maryann Mitchell (September 25, 1933 – December 28, 2002) was an American politician who served as a member of the Washington House of Representatives for the 30th district from 1991 to 1993 and again from 1995 to 2002.
