= Quintard Taylor =

American historian, blogger (born 1948)

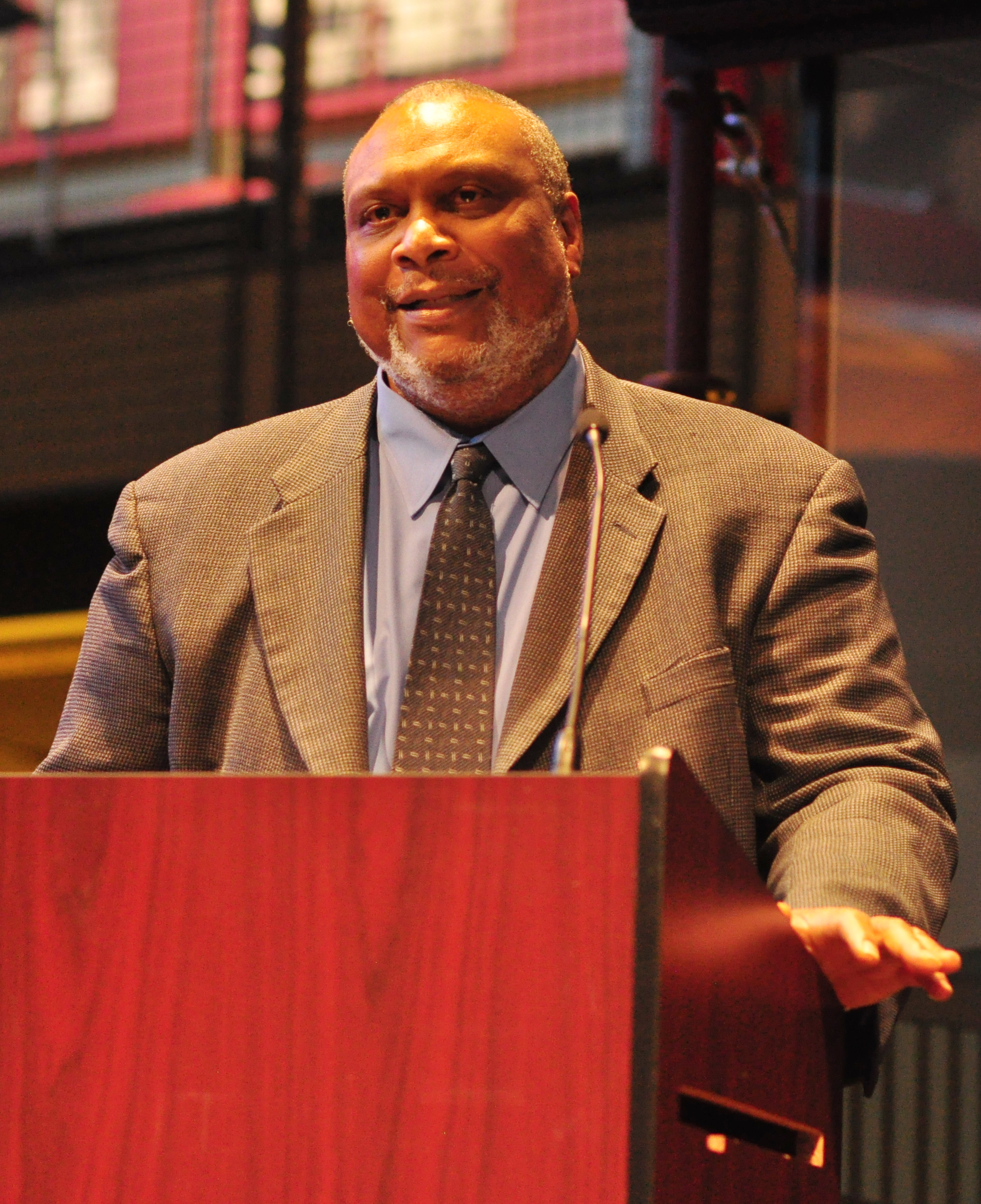
- Born: Quintard Taylor Jr. December 11, 1948; Brownsville, Tennessee, U.S.
- Died: September 21, 2025 (aged 76); Houston, Texas, U.S.
- Education: St. Augustine's College (B.A.); University of Minnesota (M.A., Ph.D.)
- Occupation: Historian
- Known for: Founder of BlackPast.org
- Spouse: Phylisha Agbor Taylor
- Children: 3 including Jamila Taylor

Quintard Taylor (December 11, 1948 – September 21, 2025) was an American historian and former professor of the University of Washington. He was founder of BlackPast.org, an online encyclopedia dedicated to African-American history.

== Personal life ==
Taylor was born on December 11, 1948, to Quintard Taylor Sr. and Grace Taylor in Brownsville, Tennessee, where he finished his high school education. Taylor completed his B.A. from St. Augustine's College in 1969 in American History, and finished his M.A. degree and his Ph.D. from the University of Minnesota in 1971 and 1977, respectively in History.

While working as a teacher at the Washington State University, he married Carolyn, and they had three children including politician Jamila Taylor.

Taylor taught in several universities including, Washington State University, California Polytechnic State University, the University of Oregon, and the University of Washington until becoming professor emeritus in June 2018. He was also responsible for various research works in these universities.

Apart from his research articles, he published several books and articles, including The Forging of a Black Community: A History of Seattle's Central District, The Forging of a Black Community: Seattle's Central District from 1870 through the Civil Rights Era, In Search of the Racial Frontier: African Americans in the American West 1528–1990.

== Education ==
Taylor graduated from Carver High School in Brownsville, Tennessee. He finished his high school graduation in 10th place among 210 students. His parents did not graduate from college but they motivated him to attend college. After graduating from high school he started his B.A. education.

In the 1960s, there were changes in West Tennessee initiated by the civil rights movement which attracted him to study history. He started his B.A. education, at the age of 16, at St. Augustine's College in Raleigh, North Carolina in American history and graduated in 1969.

After finishing college, he started his M.A. degree at the University of Minnesota where he began to research the topics for a new curriculum of African American history study. Allan Spear was one of the professors who introduced an African American history course called African Peoples at the University of Minnesota. Spear was first elected to the Minnesota Senate in 1972, representing a liberal Minneapolis district centered on the University of Minnesota. Taylor graduated in 1971.

In 1975, after teaching for four years at Washington State University, he started his Ph.D. program at the University of Minnesota. He finished his graduation in 1977 in History.

== Career ==
After he graduated from University of Minnesota in 1971, Taylor started his career as assistant professor at the Washington State University (WSU) in 1971. He was hired into the newly formed Black Studies program and he was one of two full-time Black Studies professors at the university for four years until 1975 before starting his PhD.

After completion of his doctorate in 1977, he started to look for a job to settle in with his family. He became a professor of history at California Polytechnic State University in 1977 where he taught until 1990.

In 1987, he was a professor of history for one year at the University of Lagos, Akoka, Nigeria until 1988. In 1990, he became a professor of history at University of Oregon where he taught for nine years until 1999.

Finally, in 1999, he became a professor of American History at the University of Washington, as the Scott & Dorothy Bullitt Professor of American History for 18 years, until June 2018 when he became professor emeritus.

His awards include a Washington State Jefferson Award (2015) and Robert Gray Medal and lifetime achievement award from the Washington State Historical Society.

== Death ==
Taylor died in Houston, Texas on September 21, 2025.

== Published works ==
=== Books ===
- The Making of the Modern World: A Reader in 20th Century Global History (Dubuque, Iowa: Kendall-Hunt Publishing Company, 1990)
- The Forging of a Black Community: A History of Seattle's Central District (Seattle: University of Washington, 2022)
- In Search of the Racial Frontier: African Americans in the American West, 1528–1990 (New York: W.W. Norton, 1998) Nominated for a Pulitzer Prize in History
- Lawrence B. de Graaf, Kevin Mulroy and Quintard Taylor, eds. Seeking El Dorado: African Americans in California, 1769-1997 (Seattle: University of Washington Press, 2001)
- Shirley Ann Wilson Moore and Quintard Taylor, eds. African American Women Confront the West, 1600–2000 (Norman: University of Oklahoma Press, 2003)
- From Timbuktu to Katrina: Readings in African American History, Vol. 1 (Boston: Thomson Wadsworth, 2008)
- From Timbuktu to Katrina: Readings in African American History, Vol. 2 (Belmont:Wadsworth Publishing, 2007),
- America-I-Am Black Facts: The Story of a People Through Timelines, 1601–2000 (New York: Tavis Smiley Books, 2009)
- Dr. Sam, Soldier, Educator, Advocate, Friend: The Autobiography of Samuel Eugene Kelly (Seattle: University of Washington Press, 2010)

=== Website ===
- Founder and Director, BlackPast.org.

=== TV series ===
- African Americans in the West, January–February 2006.
