= Sharlett Mena =

American politician

Member of the Washington House of Representatives from the 29th district
- Incumbent
- Assumed office January 9, 2023 Serving with Melanie Morgan
- Preceded by: Steve Kirby

Personal details
- Party: Democratic
- Education: Washington State University (BA)
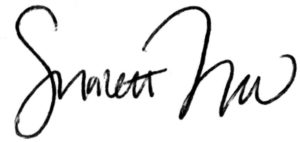
- Signature

Sharlett Mena is an American politician who is a member of the Washington House of Representatives for the 29th district. Elected in November 2022, she assumed office on January 9, 2023.

== Early life and education ==
The daughter of immigrant farmworkers from Mexico, Mena was raised in Tri-Cities, Washington. She earned a Bachelor of Arts degree in public administration from Washington State University. Mena was the first member of her family to graduate from college.

== Career ==
In 2012 and 2013, Mena served as the web communications manager for Congressman Albio Sires. From 2013 to 2016, she was the communications director and scheduler for Congressman Gene Green. Mena worked as the digital director for Governor Jay Inslee's re-election campaign during the 2016 Washington gubernatorial election.

Mena later worked as a communications specialist for Democratic members of the Washington State Legislature and served in Inslee's gubernatorial office as deputy director. In 2019, she became a special assistant to the director of the Washington State Department of Ecology.

=== Washington House of Representatives ===
In 2020, Mena challenged incumbent Democratic representative Steve Kirby. During her 2020 campaign, she was endorsed by Vermont Senator Bernie Sanders. In 2022, Kirby retired and endorsed Mena's successful campaign for the Washington House of Representatives.
