= Tim Hickel =

American politician

Member of the Washington House of Representatives from the 30th district
- In office January 9, 1995 – January 11, 1999
- Preceded by: Tracey Eide
- Succeeded by: Mark Miloscia

Personal details
- Born: Timothy Trent Hickel; February 16, 1960 (age 66)
- Party: Republican
- Spouse: Teri Hickel
- Children: 2
- Education: University of Washington (BS); University of Puget Sound (JD)

Timothy Trent Hickel (born February 16, 1960) is an American lawyer and politician who served as a member of the Washington House of Representatives, representing the 30th district from 1995 to 1999. He is a member of the Republican Party.
