= Roger Freeman (American politician) =

American politician

Member of the Washington House of Representatives from the 30th district
- In office January 14, 2013 – October 29, 2014
- Preceded by: Katrina Asay
- Succeeded by: Carol Gregory

Federal Way City Council, Position No. 6
- In office January 1, 2010 – December 31, 2012
- Preceded by: Eric Faison
- Succeeded by: Diana Noble-Gulliford

Personal details
- Born: November 30, 1965
- Died: October 29, 2014 (aged 48) Federal Way, Washington, U.S.
- Party: Democratic
- Spouse: Sonya Freeman
- Education: Iowa State University (BA); Washburn University (JD)
- Profession: Lawyer; Public defender
- Website: Official

Roger D. Freeman (November 30, 1965 – October 29, 2014) was an American lawyer and politician of the Democratic Party. He was a member of the Washington House of Representatives, representing the 30th Legislative District. He died in office of colon cancer, but was subsequently re-elected posthumously. Freeman was African-American.
