= Teri Hickel =

American politician (born 1960)

Member of the Washington House of Representatives from the 30th district
- In office November 3, 2015 – January 9, 2017
- Preceded by: Carol Gregory
- Succeeded by: Kristine Reeves

Personal details
- Born: Teri Helen Hammermaster; July 6, 1960 (age 66) Puyallup, Washington, U.S.
- Party: Republican
- Spouse: Tim Hickel
- Children: 2
- Education: Washington State University (BS)

Teri Helen Hickel (née Hammermaster; born July 6, 1960) is a Republican former member of the Washington House of Representatives. She was elected in 2015 to finish out the term of Roger Freeman, who died. Carol Gregory had been appointed to serve the first year of Freeman's term, which was to be confirmed by special election in 2015. Hickel won that election, but lost re-election in the regular 2016 election to Democrat Kristine Reeves.

== Personal life ==
Hickel and her husband, Tim, also a former state representative, have two children; Mackenzie and Morgan.

== Electoral history ==
Washington's 30th Legislative District State Representative, Pos. 2, Primary Election 2015
Party	Candidate	Votes	%
Republican	Teri Hickel	7,982	51.74
Democratic	Carol Gregory (Appointed Incumbent)	7,446	48.26

Washington's 30th Legislative District State Representative, Pos. 2, General Election 2015
Party	Candidate	Votes	%
Republican	Teri Hickel	12,652	54.81
Democratic	Carol Gregory (Appointed Incumbent)	10,431	45.19

Washington's 30th Legislative District State Representative, Pos. 2, Primary Election 2016
Party	Candidate	Votes	%
Republican	Teri Hickel	10,334	49.84
Democratic	Kristine Reeves	10,412	50.16

Washington's 30th Legislative District State Representative, Pos. 2, General Election 2016
Party	Candidate	Votes	%
Republican	Teri Hickel	24,124	48.9
Democratic	Kristine Reeves	25,206	51.1
