= Katrina Asay =

American politician

Member of the Washington House of Representatives from the 30th district
- In office December 3, 2010 – January 14, 2013
- Preceded by: Skip Priest
- Succeeded by: Roger Freeman

Personal details
- Born: November 8, 1957 (age 68)
- Party: Republican
- Spouse: Neil Asay
- Education: Heald College
- Profession: Tax preparer Realtor

Katrina L. Asay (born November 8, 1957) is an American politician of the Republican Party. She was a member of the Washington House of Representatives, representing Washington's 30th legislative district, from 2010 to 2013.
