= Krista Perez =

American politician

Member-elect of the Washington House of Representatives from the 29th district
- Assuming office January 2027
- Succeeding: Melanie Morgan

Personal details
- Party: Democratic

Krista Perez is an American politician. A member of the Democratic Party, she is the member-elect for the 29th district of the Washington House of Representatives.
