= Jamila Taylor =

American politician from Washington

Member of the Washington House of Representatives from the 30th district
- Incumbent
- Assumed office January 11, 2021 Serving with Kristine Reeves
- Preceded by: Mike Pellicciotti

Personal details
- Born: December 9, 1975 (age 50) Saint Paul, Minnesota, U.S.
- Party: Democratic
- Education: Virginia State University (BA); University of Oregon (JD)

Jamila E. Taylor (born December 9, 1975) is an American attorney, activist, and politician who is a representative for District 30 in the Washington House of Representatives. Elected in 2020, she assumed office on January 11, 2021.

== Early life and education ==
Jamila Taylor was born on December 9, 1975. She is the only daughter of historian Quintard Taylor Jr. and his wife Carolyn. Taylor has two brothers including a twin brother. Taylor earned a Bachelor of Arts degree from Virginia State University and a Juris Doctor from the University of Oregon School of Law.

== Career ==
Since graduating from law school, Taylor has worked as a public interest attorney and owner of the NW Prosper Law.

Prior to her campaign for the Washington House, Taylor was a candidate for the Federal Way, Washington City Council in 2019, and was one of three nominees of the 30th Legislative District Democrats to be appointed to the seat of former representative Kristine Reeves. After Mike Pellicciotti announced that he would not seek re-election to the Washington House of Representatives and instead run for Washington State Treasurer, Taylor declared her candidacy to succeed him. Taylor placed first in the August 2020 Democratic primary and defeated Republican nominee Martin Moore in the November general election. She assumed office on January 11, 2021.

== Electoral history ==
Washington's 30th Legislative District State Representative, Pos. 1, General Election 2020
Party	Candidate	Votes	%	±%
Democratic	Jamila Taylor	36,338	57.86	
Republican	Martin Moore	26,406	42.04	
