= Ray Schow =

American politician

Member of the Washington Senate from the 30th district
- In office January 7, 1994 – January 11, 1999
- Preceded by: Pete von Reichbauer
- Succeeded by: Tracey Eide

Personal details
- Born: Montana, U.S.
- Party: Republican
- Spouse: Lynne Schow

Ray Schow is an American politician who served as a member of the Washington State Senate, representing the 30th district from 1994 to 1999. A member of the Republican Party, he was appointed to fill the vacancy created by Pete von Reichbauer's resignation to become a member of the King County Council in January 1994 and was defeated by Democrat Tracey Eide in 1998.
