= Kristine Reeves =

American politician (born 1981)

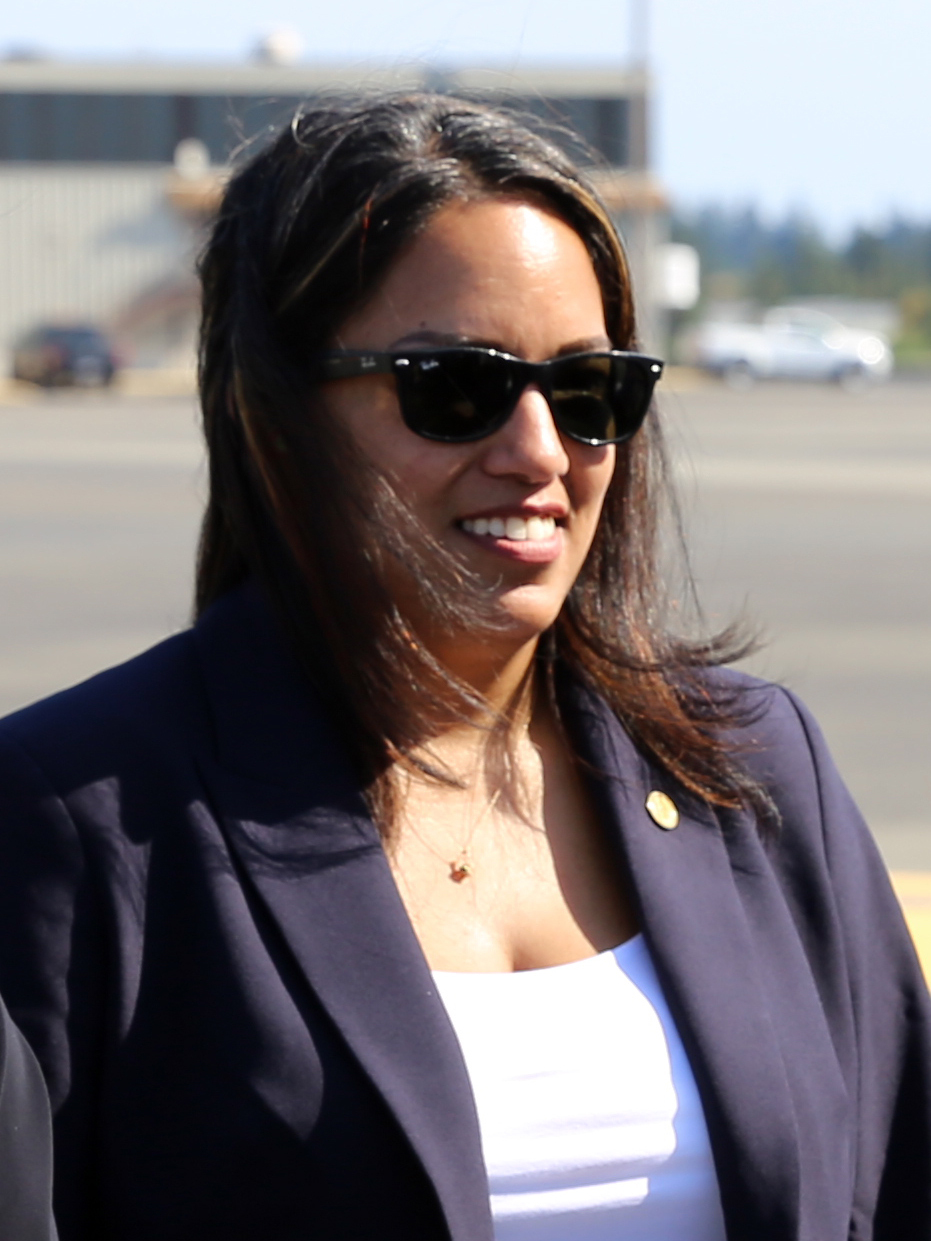

Member of the Washington House of Representatives from the 30th district
- Incumbent
- Assumed office January 9, 2023 Serving with Jamila Taylor
- Preceded by: Jesse Johnson
- In office January 9, 2017 – December 16, 2019
- Preceded by: Teri Hickel
- Succeeded by: Jesse Johnson

Personal details
- Born: Kristine Monic Reeves; February 18, 1981 (age 45) Moses Lake, Washington, U.S.
- Party: Democratic
- Children: 2
- Education: Washington State University (BA); Gonzaga University (MA)
- Website: Official website

Kristine Monic Reeves (born February 18, 1981) is an American politician who serves as a member of the Washington House of Representatives from the 30th district. She was initially elected in 2016 but resigned before finishing her term to run for Washington's 10th congressional district in the 2020 election; she ultimately placed third in the blanket primary. In 2022 she ran for her previously held state legislative seat when her appointed successor chose not to seek re-election. She is a member of the Democratic Party.

== Early life and education ==
Reeves was born in Moses Lake, Washington. She earned a Bachelor of Arts in political science from Washington State University and Master of Arts in organizational leadership from Gonzaga University. She is currently a candidate in Seattle Pacific University's industrial-organizational psychology Ph.D. program.

== Career ==
Reeves is also a former regional outreach director for United States Senator Patty Murray, as well as a program coordinator for Spokane Community College. Since 2013, Reeves has worked as Director of the Military and Defense Sector within the Washington State Department of Commerce.

Reeves ran for the Washington State House in 2016, defeating Republican Teri Hickel with 51 percent of the vote. Reeves was a member of the Capital Budget and Community Development, Housing and Tribal Affairs, as well as the vice chair of the Business and Financial Services Committee.

Reeves announced on December 16, 2019, that she would be resigning her seat in the state house effective at noon that same day. Her announcement and an e-mail from her political consultant led some to believe she would be running for Washington's 10th congressional district in the 2020 election. She formally announced her campaign on January 6, 2020. Reeves finished in third place, behind former Tacoma mayor Marilyn Strickland and State Rep. Beth Doglio.

Reeves is executive director of the Washington Military Alliance. As Director of Economic Development for the Military and Defense sector, she focuses on economic development relating to military infrastructure, suppliers and contractors, as well as community advocacy and public infrastructure organizations.

== Personal life ==
Reeves lives in Federal Way, Washington with her family, including two children.

Washington House of Representatives
Preceded by Teri Hickel	Member of the Washington House of Representatives from the 30th district 2017–2019	Succeeded by Jesse Johnson
Preceded by Jesse Johnson	Member of the Washington House of Representatives from the 30th district 2023–present	Incumbent
