= Melanie Morgan (politician) =

American politician (born 1967)

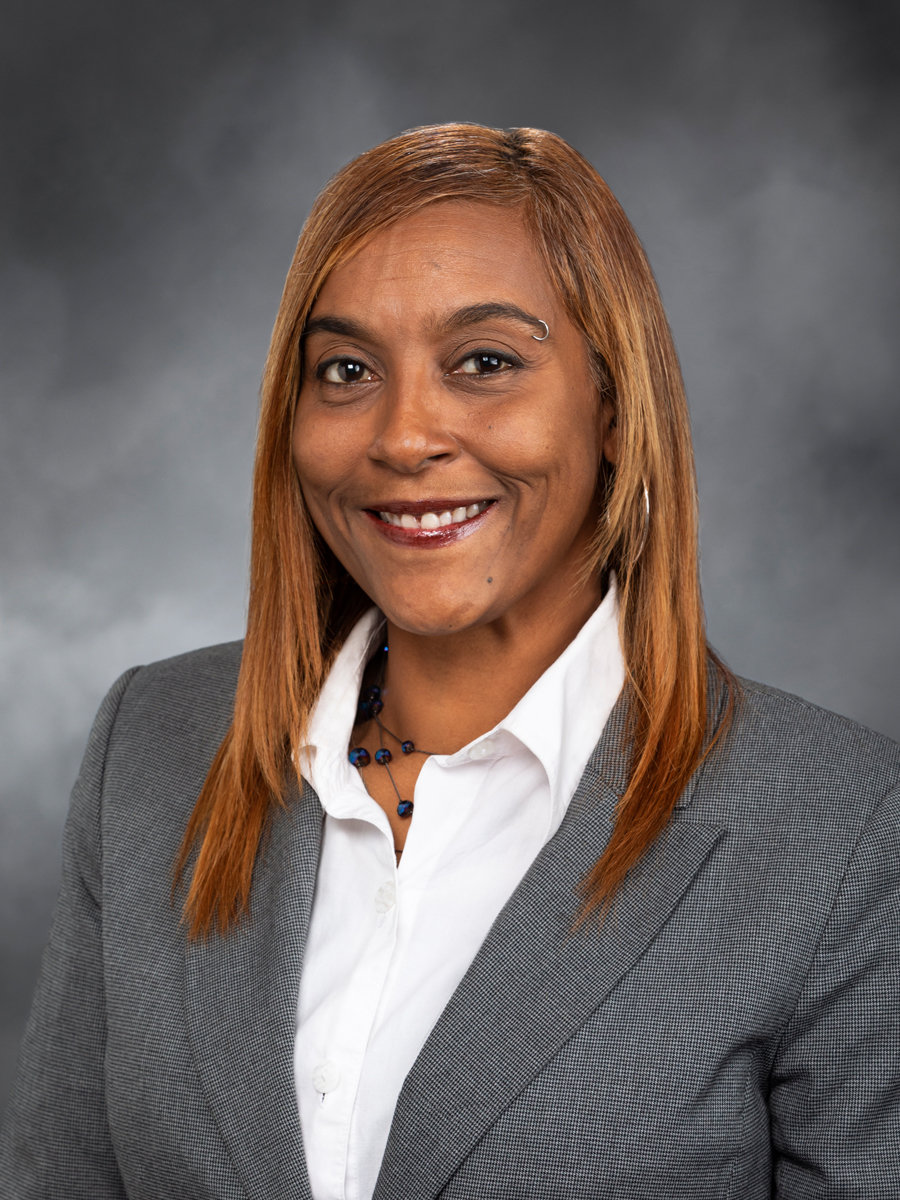

Member of the Washington House of Representatives from the 29th district
- Incumbent
- Assumed office January 14, 2019 Serving with Sharlett Mena
- Preceded by: David Sawyer
- Succeeded by: Krista Perez (elect)

Personal details
- Born: Melanie Virginia Morgan; November 11, 1967 (age 59) London, England
- Party: Democratic
- Education: St. Martin's University (BA)

Military service
- Branch/service: United States Army

Melanie Virginia Morgan (born November 11, 1967) is an American politician serving as a Democratic member of the Washington House of Representatives, representing the 29th legislative district.

== Career ==
Morgan is a veteran of the United States Army.

She was appointed by the Pierce County Council as a member of the Pierce County Housing Authority, and she also served on the Board of Community Healthcare.

Morgan was first elected to the Franklin-Pierce School Board in 2015. Morgan was elected to the Washington House of Representatives in 2018, defeating Republican Terry Harder. In the primary, Morgan and Harder advanced to the general election defeating the incumbent David Sawyer.

Morgan sponsored House bill 1016 to designate June 19 ("Juneteenth") as a state holiday. The House passed the bill in February on an 89-9 vote. The bill passed the Democratic-led Senate on a bipartisan 47-1. Governor Jay Inslee signed the bill on May 13, 2021.
