= David Sawyer =

American politician (born 1983)

Member of the Washington House of Representatives from the 29th district
- In office January 14, 2013 – January 14, 2019
- Preceded by: Connie Ladenburg
- Succeeded by: Melanie Morgan

Personal details
- Born: David James Sawyer; 1983 (age 42–43) Pierce County, Washington, U.S.
- Party: Democratic
- Education: Central Washington University (BA)

David James Sawyer (born 1983) is an American politician of the Democratic Party. He was a member of the Washington House of Representatives, representing the 29th district from 2013 to 2019.

On February 21, 2018, The Seattle Times reported that allegations of misconduct by Sawyer were being reviewed and that his contact with staff was restricted.

On February 23, 2018, the Tacoma News Tribune reported that several women accused Sawyer of 'unprofessional, inappropriate behavior'. And in a Facebook post on March 13, 2018 the Chair of the Pierce County Democrats (Timothy Farrell) asked Sawyer to resign, which Sawyer did not do pending the results of the review.

Sawyer placed third in the 2018 Washington primary and failed to advance to the general election.
