= Linda Kochmar =

American politician from Washington

President of the Federal Way City Council
- Incumbent
- Assumed office January 4, 2022
- Preceded by: Susan Honda

Member of the Federal Way City Council
- Incumbent
- Assumed office January 7, 2020
- Preceded by: Dini Duclos
- Constituency: Position 7
- In office January 1, 1998 – January 1, 2012
- Preceded by: Hope Elder
- Succeeded by: Kelly Maloney
- Constituency: Position 2

Member of the Washington House of Representatives from the 30th district
- In office January 14, 2013 – January 9, 2017
- Preceded by: Mark Miloscia
- Succeeded by: Mike Pellicciotti

Personal details
- Born: Linda Louise Stohosky; October 25, 1944 (age 81) Oregon, U.S.
- Party: Republican
- Education: Marylhurst College (BA); Seattle University (MPA)
- Profession: Risk manager
- Website: Official

Linda Louise Kochmar (née Stohosky, born October 25, 1944) is an American politician serving as the president of the Federal Way City Council since 2022. She has served as a member of the council since 2020, an office she previously held from 1998 to 2012. A member of the Republican Party, she previously served as a member of the Washington House of Representatives, representing the 30th district from 2013 to 2017.
