= Skip Priest =

American politician from Washington State (born 1950)

Mahlon "Skip" Priest

1st Mayor of Federal Way, Washington
- In office December 1, 2010 – January 1, 2014
- Preceded by: Office established
- Succeeded by: Jim Ferrell

Member of the Washington House of Representatives from the 30th district
- In office January 13, 2003 – December 1, 2010
- Preceded by: Maryann Mitchell
- Succeeded by: Katrina Asay

Federal Way City Council, Position No. 4
- In office January 1, 1992 – December 31, 1997
- Preceded by: Jim Webster
- Succeeded by: Jeanne Burbidge

Personal details
- Born: March 18, 1950 (age 76) New York, U.S.
- Party: Republican
- Spouse: Trisha Bennett
- Children: Zachary; Amanda
- Education: Willamette University (BA); George Washington University (JD)
- Profession: Small business owner Consultant

Mahlon S. Priest (born March 18, 1950) is an American politician of the Republican Party. Priest was the first elected mayor of Federal Way, Washington, serving from 2010 to 2014. Earlier he served four terms in the Washington House of Representatives representing Washington's 30th legislative district and six years on the Federal Way City Council.

== Personal ==
After being defeated for a second term, Skip Priest retired to Idaho with his wife (Trisha Bennett).

== Public and community service ==
Former Representative Priest served three terms. Elected as a Republican, he represented the 30th Legislative District. Prior to serving in the House of Representatives, he was Mayor of Federal Way and Chair of the City Council's Land Use and Transportation Committee. Other activities include:

- Board Member: Pacific Harbors Council B.S.A.
  - Silver Beaver Award
- Board Member: Federal Way Kiwanis
  - Hixson Fellowship
- Advisory Board Member: The Friends of the Hylebos
- Board Member: Federal Way Chamber Advancing Leadership Program
- Board Member: South King County Multi-Service Center
- Member: Federal Way School District Construction Oversight Committee
