= Washington's 30th legislative district =

American legislative district

Coordinates: 47°18′N 122°19′W

Map of Washington's 30th legislative district

Washington's 30th legislative district is one of forty-nine districts in Washington state for representation in the state legislature.

It is mostly in King County with a small section in Pierce County. It covers the cities of Federal Way, Des Moines, Auburn, Algona, Pacific, and Milton, as well as unincorporated parts of King County.

The district's legislators are state senator Claire Wilson and state representatives Jamila Taylor (position 1) and Kristine Reeves (position 2), all Democrats.

== See also ==
- Washington Redistricting Commission
- Washington State Legislature
- Washington State Senate
- Washington House of Representatives
