= 2024 Washington State Senate election =

Washington State Senate elections, 2024
- November 5, 2024

25 of 49 seats in the Washington State Senate 25 seats needed for a majority

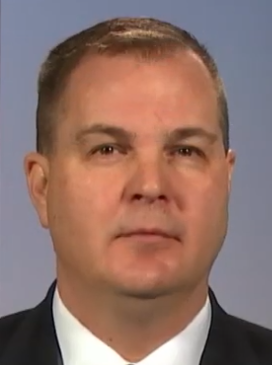
	Majority party	Minority party
Leader	Andy Billig (retired)	John Braun
Party	Democratic	Republican
Leader's seat	3rd	20th
Seats before	29	20
Seats won	30	19
Seat change	▲1	▼1
Popular vote	978,951	876,073
Percentage	52.38%	46.88%
Swing	▼4.43 pp	▲7.59 pp
- Democratic gain Democratic hold Republican hold No election 40–50% 50–60% 60–70% 70–80% >90% 50–60% 60–70% >90%
Majority Leader before election
Andy Billig
Democratic
Elected Majority Leader
Jamie Pedersen
Democratic

The 2024 Washington State Senate elections were held on November 5, 2024, with a nonpartisan blanket primary election held on August 6, 2024. Voters in 25 of the 49 state legislative districts elected Senators to the Washington State Senate. The elections will coincide with other elections for federal, state, and local offices.

== Background ==
=== Soto Palmer v. Hobbs ===
Judge Robert S. Lasnik of the United States District Court for the Western District of Washington ruled that the 15th legislative district violated the Voting Rights Act by diluting Latino votes in the Yakima Valley region and necessitated redrawing.

Plaintiffs provided five remedial maps awaiting Lasnik's approval. On March 16, 2024, the judge selected a new redistricting map which significantly changes the boundaries of several districts in the Yakima Valley and changes the numbering of District 15 to District 14. This change in number means that elections for district 14 in the State Senate will now be held in Presidential Election Years, which typically have higher turnout than midterm election years among Latino voters.

== Partisan Background ==
In the 2020 Presidential Election, Democrat Joe Biden won 34 of Washington State's legislative districts and Republican Donald Trump won 15 of Washington State's legislative districts. Out of the 25 State Senate districts that are up for election in the 2024 Washington State Senate Election, Republicans represented 5 districts that Joe Biden won in 2020: District 10 (Biden + 6%); District 12 (Biden + 3%); Majority-Minority District 14 (Biden + 14%); District 17 (Biden + 6%); and District 25 (Biden + 2%).

Biden 40–50% 50–60% 60–70% 70–80% 80–90% 90–100% / Trump 40–50% 50–60% 60–70%

== Retirements ==
Eight incumbents did not seek re-election.

=== Democrats ===
1. District 3: Andy Billig is retiring.
2. District 5: Mark Mullet is retiring to run for Governor.
3. District 22: Sam Hunt is retiring.
4. District 24: Kevin Van De Wege is retiring to run for Public Lands Commissioner.

=== Republicans ===
1. District 4: Mike Padden is retiring.
2. District 12: Brad Hawkins is retiring to run for Chelan County Commission.
3. District 17: Lynda Wilson is retiring.
4. District 18: Ann Rivers is retiring.

== Predictions ==
Source	Ranking	As of
Sabato's Crystal Ball	Likely D	October 23, 2024

== Summary of results by district ==
†: Incumbent not running for re-election.

State Senate District	Incumbent	Party	Elected senator	Party
1st	Derek Stanford	Dem	Derek Stanford	Dem
2nd	Jim McCune	Rep	Jim McCune	Rep
3rd	† Andy Billig	Dem	Marcus Riccelli	Dem
4th	† Mike Padden	Rep	Leonard Christian	Rep
5th	† Mark Mullet	Dem	Bill Ramos	Dem
9th	Mark Schoesler	Rep	Mark Schoesler	Rep
10th	Ron Muzzall	Rep	Ron Muzzall	Rep
11th	Bob Hasegawa	Dem	Bob Hasegawa	Dem
12th	† Brad Hawkins	Rep	Keith Goehner	Rep
14th	Curtis King	Rep	Curtis King	Rep
16th	Perry Dozier	Rep	Perry Dozier	Rep
17th	† Lynda Wilson	Rep	Paul Harris	Rep
18th	† Ann Rivers	Rep	Adrian Cortes	Dem
19th	Jeff Wilson	Rep	Jeff Wilson	Rep
20th	John Braun	Rep	John Braun	Rep
22nd	† Sam Hunt	Dem	Jessica Bateman	Dem
23rd	Drew Hansen	Dem	Drew Hansen	Dem
24th	† Kevin Van De Wege	Dem	Mike Chapman	Dem
25th	Chris Gildon	Rep	Chris Gildon	Rep
27th	Yasmin Trudeau	Dem	Yasmin Trudeau	Dem
28th	T'wina Nobles	Dem	T'wina Nobles	Dem
39th	Keith Wagoner	Rep	Keith Wagoner	Rep
40th	Liz Lovelett	Dem	Liz Lovelett	Dem
41st	Lisa Wellman	Dem	Lisa Wellman	Dem
49th	Annette Cleveland	Dem	Annette Cleveland	Dem

== District 1 ==
2024 Washington's 1st legislative district Senate election
Nominee	Derek Stanford
Party	Democratic
Popular vote	60,568
Percentage	96.0%
State Senator before election
Derek Stanford
Democratic
Elected State Senator
Derek Stanford
Democratic

=== Candidates ===
- Derek Stanford (Democratic), incumbent state senator

=== Results ===
Washington's 1st State Senate District, 2024
Primary election
Party	Candidate	Votes	%
Democratic	Derek Stanford (incumbent)	30,980	96.0
Write-in		1,282	4.0
Total votes		32,262	100.0
General election
Democratic	Derek Stanford (incumbent)	60,568	96.0
Write-in		2,509	4.0
Total votes		63,077	100.0

== District 2 ==
2024 Washington's 2nd legislative district Senate election

Nominee	Jim McCune	Erasmo Ruiz Gonzalez
Party	Republican	Democratic
Popular vote	47,908	27,955
Percentage	63.1%	36.8%
State Senator before election
Jim McCune
Republican
Elected State Senator
Jim McCune
Republican

=== Candidates ===
- Jim McCune (Republican), incumbent state senator
- Erasmo Ruiz Gonzalez (Democratic), Bethel School Board director

==== Eliminated in primary ====
- Ronda Litzenberger (Republican), Eatonville School Board director

=== Endorsements ===
Ronda Litzenberger (R)

State legislators

- J. T. Wilcox, Minority Leader of the Washington House of Representatives

Local officials

- Joe DePinto, mayor of Yelm

=== Results ===
Washington's 2nd State Senate District, 2024
Primary election
Party	Candidate	Votes	%
Republican	Jim McCune (incumbent)	14,596	38.9
Democratic	Erasmo Ruiz Gonzalez	12,822	34.2
Republican	Ronda Litzenberger	10,032	26.8
Write-in		33	0.1
Total votes		37,483	100.0
General election
Republican	Jim McCune (incumbent)	47,908	63.1
Democratic	Erasmo Ruiz Gonzalez	27,955	36.8
Write-in		111	0.15
Total votes		75,974	100.0

== District 3 ==
2024 Washington's 3rd legislative district Senate election

Nominee	Marcus Riccelli	Jim Wilson (Note: Wilson did not appear on the primary ballot, but garnered signatures to appear on the general election ballot. He did not launch his campaign before the primary.)
Party	Democratic	Republican
Popular vote	45,471	29,532
Percentage	60.6%	39.3%
- Results by precinct Riccelli: 50–60% 60–70% 70–80% 80–90% Wilson: 50–60% 60–70%
State Senator before election
Andy Billig
Democratic
Elected State Senator
Marcus Riccelli
Democratic

The incumbent is Democrat Andy Billig, who is retiring.

Republican Jim Wilson did not announce his run before August 6, and thus did not appear on the ballot for the primary election, but garnered enough signatures to appear on the general election ballot.

=== Candidates ===
- Marcus Riccelli (Democratic), state representative
- Jim Wilson, businessman

==== Withdrawn ====
- Ericka Lalka (Republican), candidate for Spokane School Board

=== Results ===
Washington's 3rd State Senate District, 2024
Primary election
Party	Candidate	Votes	%
Democratic	Marcus Riccelli	27,807	92.4
Write-in		2,300	7.6
Total votes		30,107	100.0
General election
Democratic	Marcus Riccelli	45,471	60.6
Republican	Jim Wilson	29,532	39.3
Write-in		96	0.1
Total votes		75,099	100.0

== District 4 ==
2024 Washington's 4th legislative district Senate election
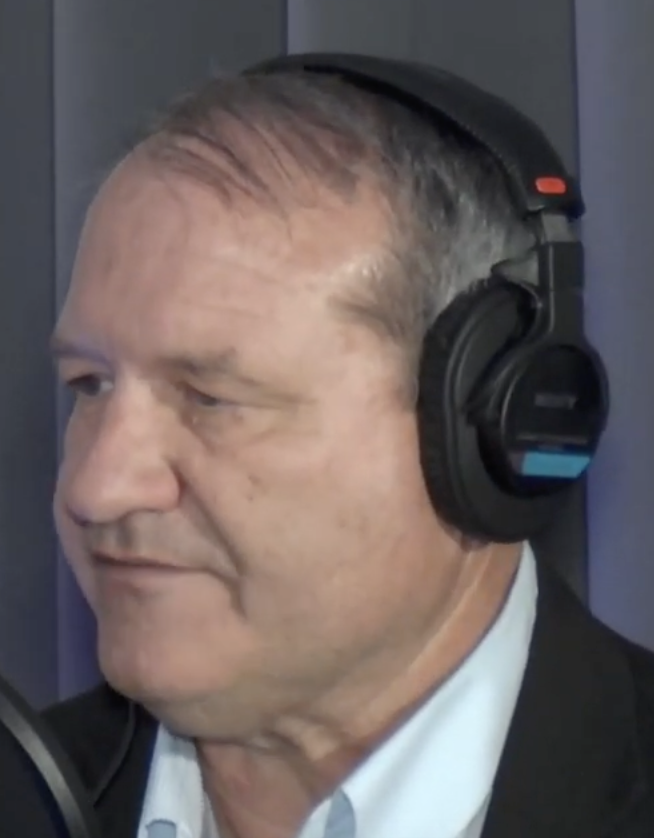

Nominee	Leonard Christian	Miguel Valencia
Party	Republican	Democratic
Popular vote	53,623	29,653
Percentage	64.3%	35.6%
- Results by precinct Christian: 40–50% 50–60% 60–70% 70–80% Valencia: 50–60%
State Senator before election
Mike Padden
Republican
Elected State Senator
Leonard Christian
Republican

The incumbent is Republican Mike Padden, who is retiring.

=== Candidates ===
- Leonard Christian (Republican), state representative
- Miguel Valencia (Democratic), Democratic precinct committee officer and Army veteran

==== Eliminated in primary ====
- Pam Haley (Republican), mayor of Spokane Valley
- Mike Kelly (Republican), member of the Spokane Valley Planning Commission
- Al Merkel (Republican), Spokane Valley city councilor
- Paige Scott (Democratic), member of the National Guard

=== Endorsements ===
Pam Haley (R)

State legislators

- Jeff Holy, state senator
- Shelly Short, state senator
- Mike Volz, state representative
Mike Kelly (R)

State legislators

- Mike Padden, incumbent state senator

Local officials

- Michael Baumgartner, Spokane County Treasurer and candidate for U.S. House of Representatives

=== Results ===
Washington's 4th State Senate District, 2024
Primary election
Party	Candidate	Votes	%
Democratic	Miguel Valencia	9,146	22.1
Republican	Leonard Christian	8,876	21.5
Republican	Mike Kelly	8,673	21.0
Republican	Pam Haley	5,306	12.8
Republican	Al Merkel	4,948	12.0
Democratic	Paige Scott	4,378	10.6
Write-in		54	0.1
Total votes		41,381	100.0
General election
Republican	Leonard Christian	53,623	64.3
Democratic	Miguel Valencia	29,653	35.6
Write-in		131	0.2
Total votes		83,407	100.0

== District 5 ==
2024 Washington's 5th legislative district Senate election
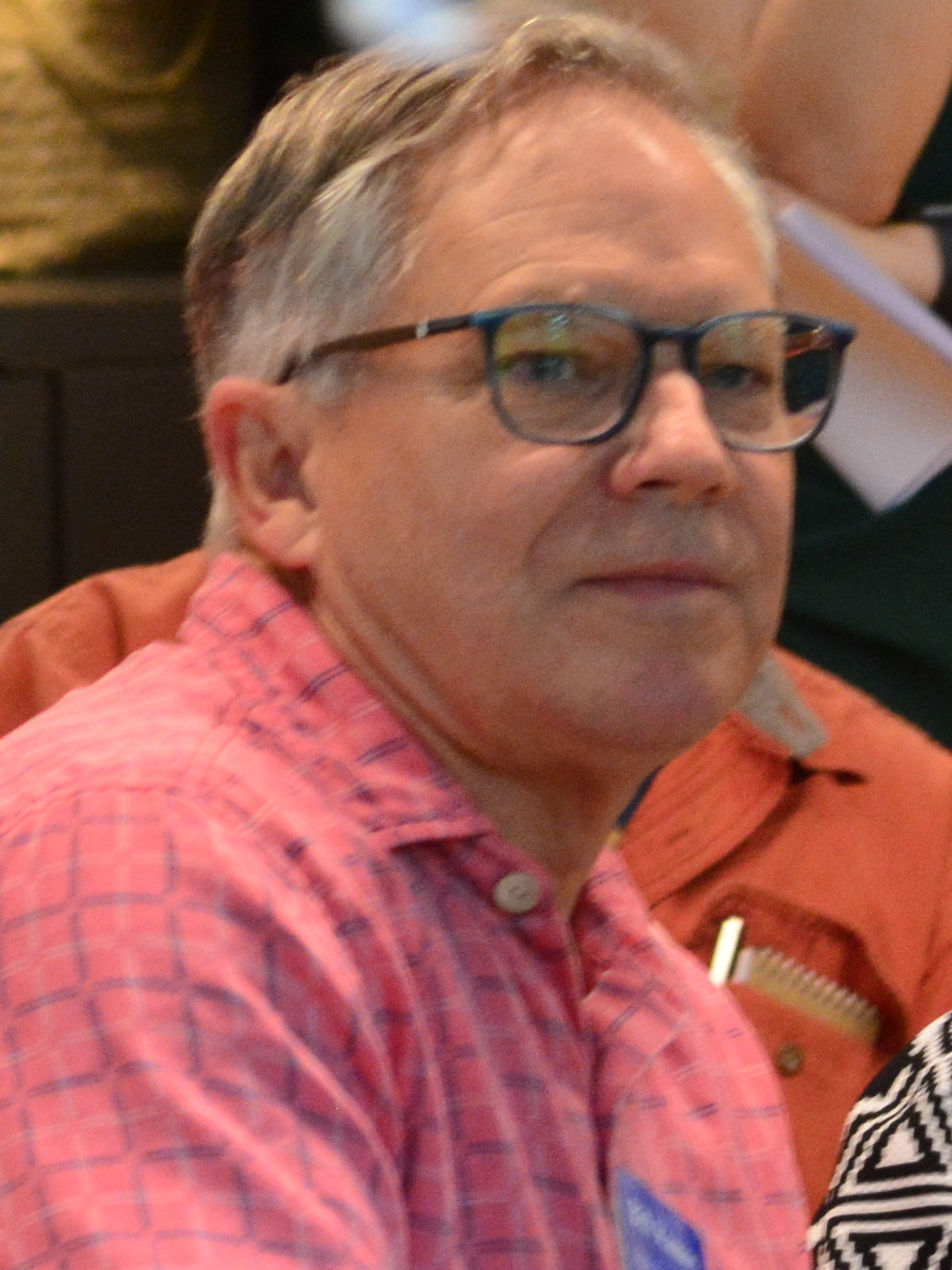

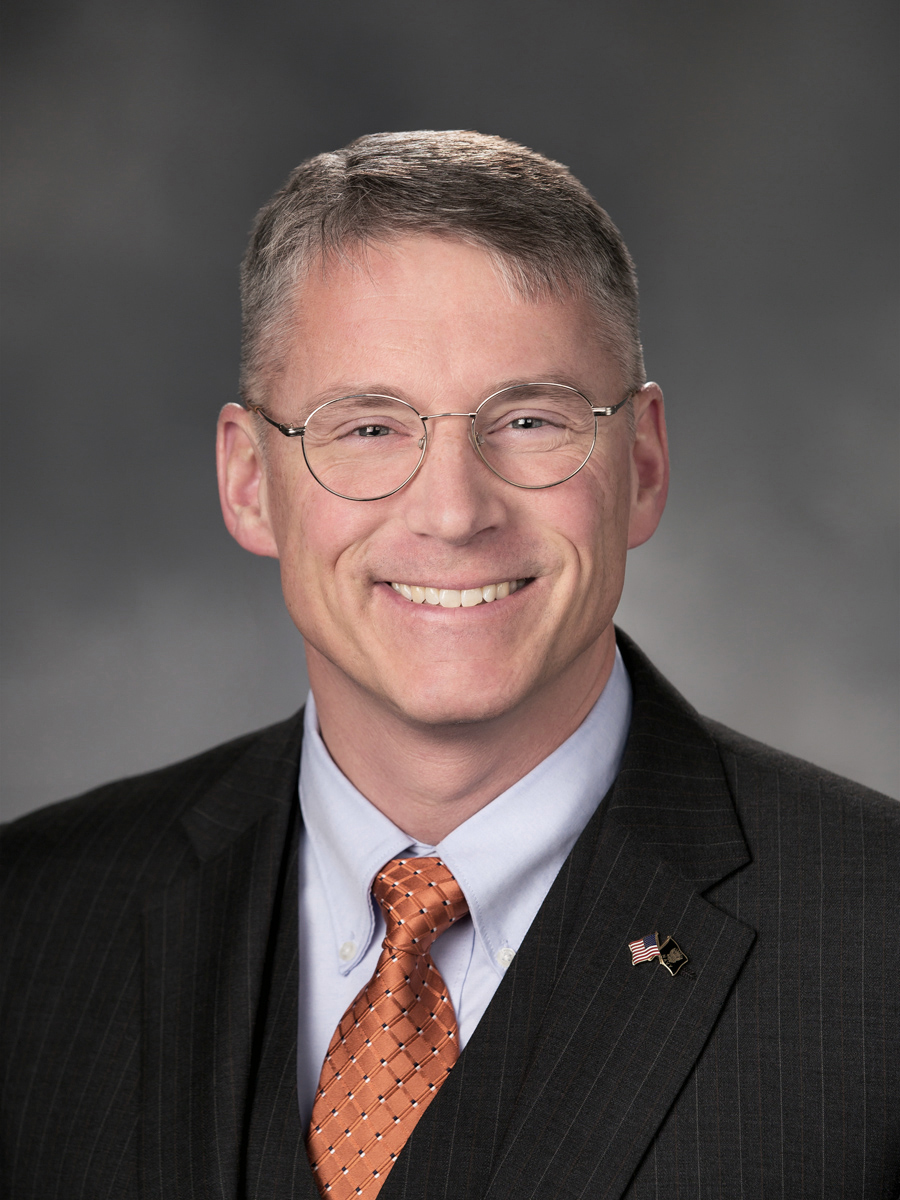
Nominee	Bill Ramos	Chad Magendanz
Party	Democratic	Republican
Popular vote	44,379	40,959
Percentage	52.0%	48.0%
- Results by precinct Magendanz: 50–60% 60–70% 70–80% Ramos: 50–60% 60–70% 70–80% No data
State Senator before election
Mark Mullet
Democratic
Elected State Senator
Bill Ramos
Democratic

The incumbent is Democrat Mark Mullet, who retired to run for Governor.

=== Candidates ===
- Chad Magendanz (Republican), former state representative
- Bill Ramos (Democratic), state representative

=== Results ===
Washington's 5th State Senate District, 2024
Primary election
Party	Candidate	Votes	%
Democratic	Bill Ramos	24,309	53.8
Republican	Chad Magendanz	20,865	46.2
Write-in		28	0.1
Total votes		45,202	100.0
General election
Democratic	Bill Ramos	44,379	52.0
Republican	Chad Magendanz	40,959	48.0
Write-in		73	0.1
Total votes		85,411	100.0

=== Endorsements ===
Chad Magendanz (R)

State executive officials

- Sam Reed, Washington Secretary of State

Mayors

- Carol Benson, mayor of Black Diamond
- Sean Kelly, mayor of Maple Valley (co-endorsement with Ramos)
- Mary Miller, mayor of North Bend
- Jan Molinaro, mayor of Enumclaw
- Mary Lou Pauly, mayor of Issaquah
- Armondo Pavone, mayor of Renton
- Katherine Ross, mayor of Snoqualmie

Organizations

- Mainstream Republicans of Washington
- Associated General Contractors of America Washington Chapter
- Washington Farm Bureau
- National Federation of Independent Business
- Washington Council of Police and Sheriffs (WACOPS)
- King County Police Officer's Guild

Newspapers

- The Seattle Times

Labor unions

- American Association of Nurse Practitioners Washington State (co-endorsement with Ramos)
Bill Ramos

Mayors

- Sean Kelly, mayor of Maple Valley (co-endorsement with Magendanz)

Labor unions

- American Association of Nurse Practitioners Washington State (co-endorsement with Magendanz)

== District 9 ==
2024 Washington's 9th legislative district Senate election
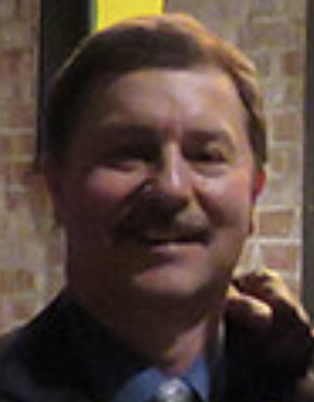
Nominee	Mark Schoesler
Party	Republican
Popular vote	57,620
Percentage	95.1%
- Results by precinct Schoesler: 70–80% 80–90% >90%
State Senator before election
Mark Schoesler
Republican
Elected State Senator
Mark Schoesler
Republican

=== Candidates ===
- Mark Schoesler (Republican), incumbent state senator

=== Results ===
Washington's 9th State Senate District, 2024
Primary election
Party	Candidate	Votes	%
Republican	Mark Schoesler (incumbent)	29,574	94.3
Write-in		1,790	5.7
Total votes		31,364	100.0
General election
Republican	Mark Schoesler (incumbent)	57,620	95.1
Write-in		2,946	4.9
Total votes		60,566	100.0

== District 10 ==
2024 Washington's 10th legislative district Senate election
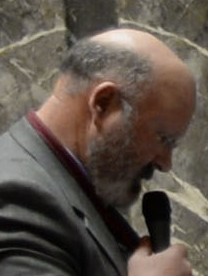

Nominee	Ron Muzzall	Janet St. Clair
Party	Republican	Democratic
Popular vote	45,794	44,002
Percentage	50.9%	48.9%
- Results by precinct Muzzall: 50–60% 60–70% 70–80% St. Clair: 50–60% 60–70% 70–80% 80–90% Tie: 50% No data
State Senator before election
Ron Muzzall
Republican
Elected State Senator
Ron Muzzall
Republican

=== Candidates ===
- Ron Muzzall (Republican), incumbent state senator
- Janet St. Clair (Democratic), Island County commissioner

==== Eliminated in primary ====
- Denny Sandberg (Democratic), former small business owner and Navy veteran

=== Endorsements ===
Ron Muzzall (R)

Newspapers

- The Everett Herald
Janet St. Clair (D)

State legislators

- Andy Billig, Majority Leader of the Washington State Senate
- Mary Margaret Haugen, former state senator
- John Lovick, state senator

=== Results ===
Washington's 10th State Senate District, 2024
Primary election
Party	Candidate	Votes	%
Republican	Ron Muzzall (incumbent)	24,724	48.3
Democratic	Janet St. Clair	23,391	45.6
Democratic	Denny Sandberg	3,072	6.0
Write-in		63	0.1
Total votes		51,250	100.0
General election
Republican	Ron Muzzall (incumbent)	45,794	50.9
Democratic	Janet St. Clair	44,002	48.9
Write-in		140	0.2
Total votes		89,936	100.0

== District 11 ==
2024 Washington's 11th legislative district Senate election
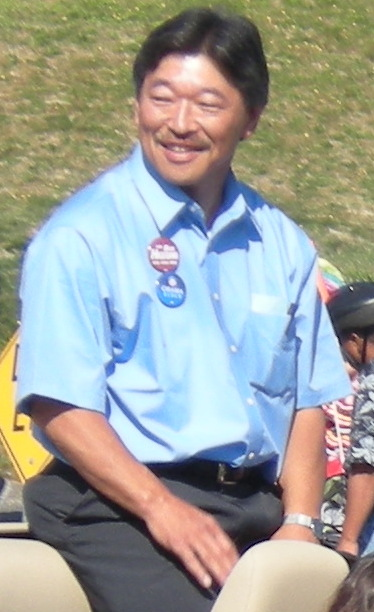
Nominee	Bob Hasegawa
Party	Democratic
Popular vote	47,324
Percentage	95.6%
State Senator before election
Bob Hasegawa
Democratic
Elected State Senator
Bob Hasegawa
Democratic

=== Candidates ===
- Bob Hasegawa (Democratic), incumbent state senator

=== Results ===
Washington's 11th State Senate District, 2024
Primary election
Party	Candidate	Votes	%
Democratic	Bob Hasegawa (incumbent)	21,167	95.3
Write-in		1,046	4.7
Total votes		22,213	100.0
General election
Democratic	Bob Hasegawa (incumbent)	47,324	95.6
Write-in		2,168	4.4
Total votes		49,492	100.0

== District 12 ==
2024 Washington's 12th legislative district Senate election
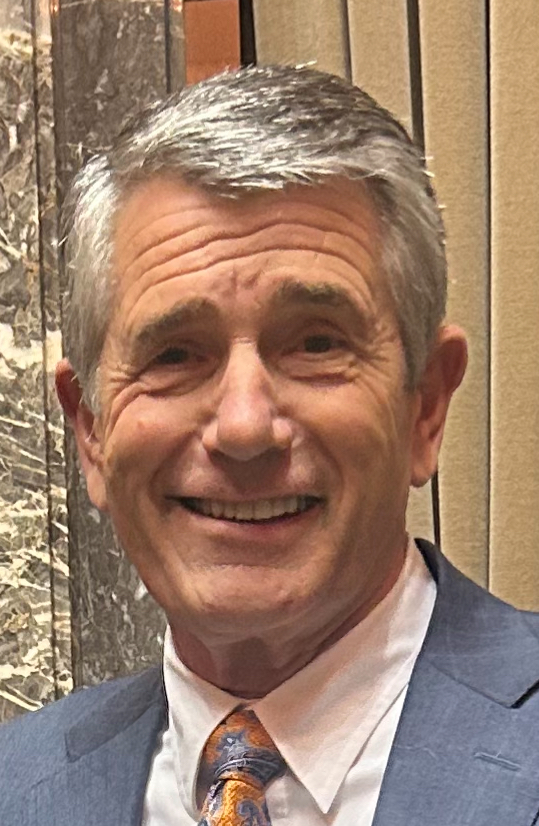

Nominee	Keith Goehner	Jim Mayhew
Party	Republican	Democratic
Popular vote	46,452	36,707
Percentage	55.8%	44.1%
- Results by precinct Goehner: 50–60% 60–70% 70–80% 80–90% >90% Mayhew: 50–60% 60–70% 70–80% Tie: 40–50% 50% No data
State Senator before election
Brad Hawkins
Republican
Elected State Senator
Keith Goehner
Republican

The incumbent is Republican Brad Hawkins, who withdrew from the race to run for Chelan County Commission.

=== Candidates ===
- Keith Goehner (Republican), state representative
- Jim Mayhew (Democratic), former Snoqualmie city councilor

==== Withdrawn ====
- Brad Hawkins (Republican), incumbent state senator (ran for Chelan County Commission, endorsed Goehner)

=== Endorsements ===
Keith Goehner (R)

State legislators

- John Braun, Minority Leader of the Washington State Senate
- Brad Hawkins, incumbent state senator
- Mike Steele, state representative

=== Results ===
Washington's 12th State Senate District, 2024
Primary election
Party	Candidate	Votes	%
Republican	Keith Goehner	24,356	56.1
Democratic	Jim Mayhew	19,039	43.8
Write-in		40	0.1
Total votes		43,435	100.0
General election
Republican	Keith Goehner	46,452	55.8
Democratic	Jim Mayhew	36,707	44.1
Write-in		53	0.1
Total votes		83,212	100.0

== District 14 ==
2024 Washington's 14th legislative district Senate election
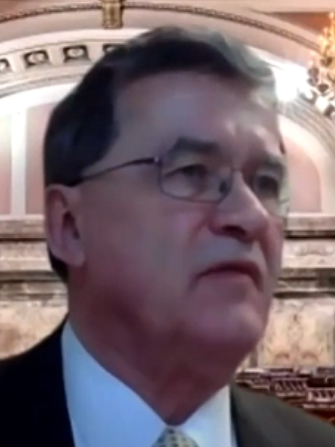

Nominee	Curtis King	Maria Beltran
Party	Republican	Democratic
Popular vote	17,643	16,346
Percentage	51.8%	48.0%
- Results by precinct King: 50–60% 60–70% 70–80% 80–90% Beltran: 50–60% 60–70% 70–80% No data
State Senator before election
Curtis King
Republican
Elected State Senator
Curtis King
Republican

=== Candidates ===
- Maria Beltran (Democratic), state House Democratic Campaign Committee employee
- Curtis King (Republican), incumbent state senator

=== Results ===
Washington's 14th State Senate District, 2024
Primary election
Party	Candidate	Votes	%
Republican	Curtis King (incumbent)	8,324	58.0
Democratic	Maria Beltran	5,988	41.7
Write-in		35	0.2
Total votes		14,347	100.0
General election
Republican	Curtis King (incumbent)	17,643	51.8
Democratic	Maria Beltran	16,346	48.0
Write-in		93	0.3
Total votes		34,082	100.0

== District 16 ==
2024 Washington's 16th legislative district Senate election
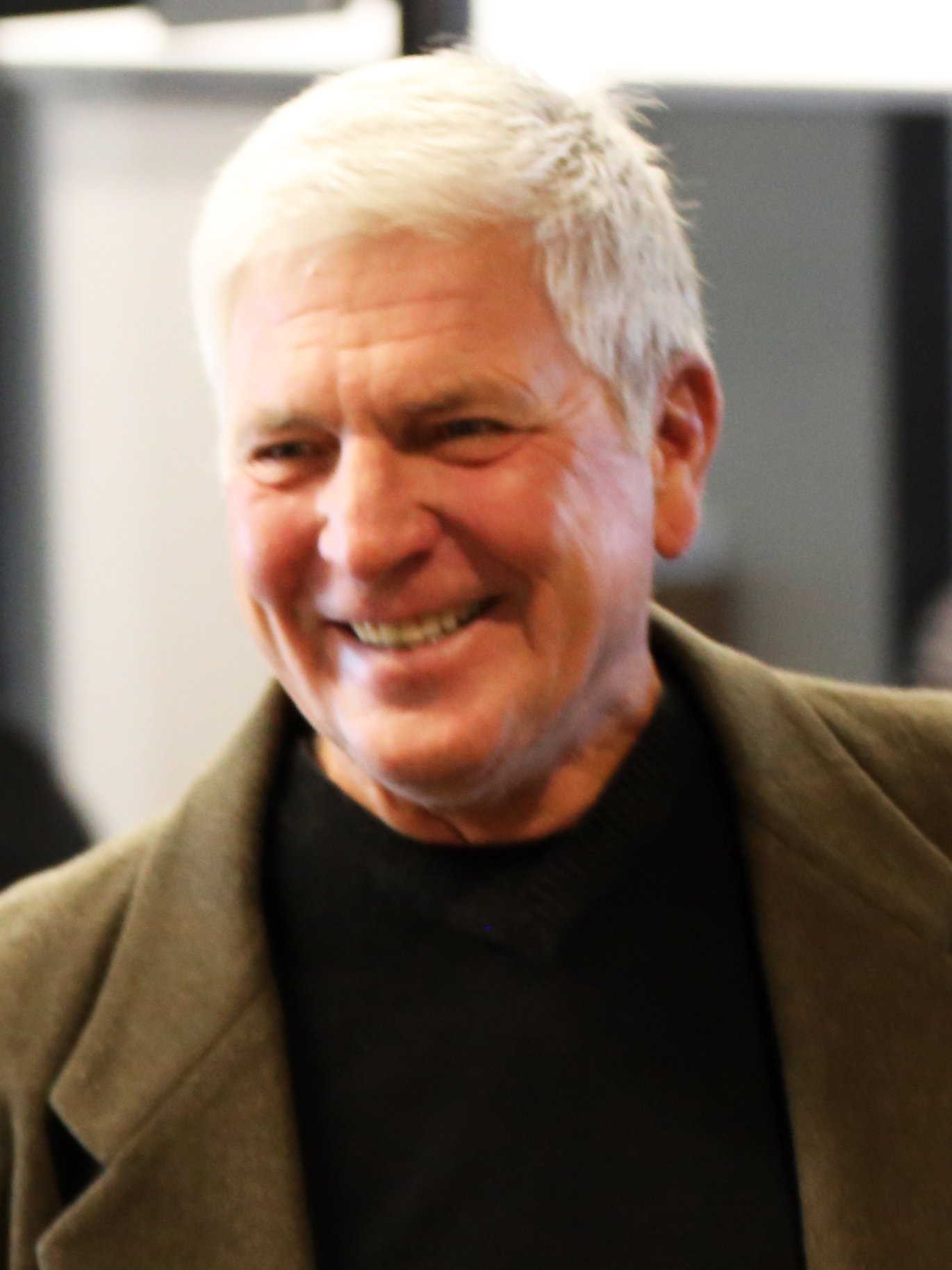

Nominee	Perry Dozier	Kari Isaacson
Party	Republican	Democratic
Popular vote	44,400	25,564
Percentage	63.4%	36.5%
State Senator before election
Perry Dozier
Republican
Elected State Senator
Perry Dozier
Republican

=== Candidates ===
- Perry Dozier (Republican), incumbent state senator
- Kari Isaacson (Democratic), chair of the Walla Walla County Democrats

=== Results ===
Washington's 16th State Senate District, 2024
Primary election
Party	Candidate	Votes	%
Republican	Perry Dozier (incumbent)	22,963	63.8
Democratic	Kari Isaacson	13,012	36.1
Write-in		31	0.1
Total votes		36,006	100.0
General election
Republican	Perry Dozier (incumbent)	44,400	63.4
Democratic	Kari Isaacson	25,564	36.5
Write-in		53	0.1
Total votes		70,017	100.0

== District 17 ==
2024 Washington's 17th legislative district Senate election
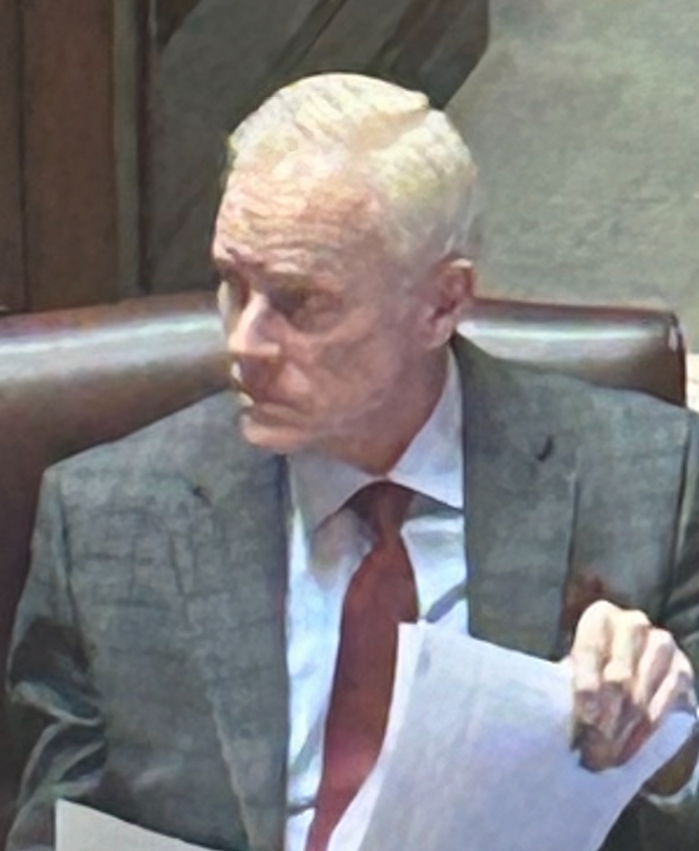

Nominee	Paul Harris	Marla Keethler
Party	Republican	Democratic
Popular vote	44,014	42,003
Percentage	51.1%	48.8%
- Harris: 50–60% 60–70% 70–80% 80–90% Keethler: 50–60% 60–70% 70–80%
State Senator before election
Lynda Wilson
Republican
Elected State Senator
Paul Harris
Republican

The incumbent is Republican Lynda Wilson, who is retiring.

=== Candidates ===
- Paul Harris (Republican), state representative
- Marla Keethler (Democratic), mayor of White Salmon

=== Results ===
Washington's 17th State Senate District, 2024
Primary election
Party	Candidate	Votes	%
Republican	Paul Harris	22,930	50.6
Democratic	Marla Keethler	22,287	49.2
Write-in		84	0.2
Total votes		45,301	100.0
General election
Republican	Paul Harris	44,014	51.1
Democratic	Marla Keethler	42,003	48.8
Write-in		135	0.2
Total votes		86,152	100.0

== District 18 ==
2024 Washington's 18th legislative district Senate election

Nominee	Adrian Cortes	Brad Benton
Party	Democratic	Republican
Popular vote	42,054	41,881
Percentage	50.0%	49.8%
- Results by precinct Cortes: 50–60% 60–70% Benton: 50–60% 60–70% 70–80% Tie: 50% No data
State Senator before election
Ann Rivers
Republican
Elected State Senator
Adrian Cortes
Democratic

The incumbent is Republican Ann Rivers, who is retiring due to redistricting.

=== Candidates ===
- Brad Benton (Republican), sales representative, son of former state senator Don Benton, and candidate for state representative in 2022
- Adrian Cortes (Democratic), Battle Ground city councilor and former mayor

==== Eliminated in the primary ====
- Greg Cheney (Republican), state representative

=== Endorsements ===
Brad Benton (R)

State legislators

- Stephanie McClintock, incumbent state representative from this district

Local officials

- Tricia Davis, Battle Ground City Councilor
- Victoria Ferrer, Battle Ground City Councilor
- Eric Overholser, Battle Ground City Councilor

Organizations

- Washington Council of Police & Sheriffs (WACOPS)
- Vancounver Police Officers Guild

Political parties

- Clark County Republican Party
Adrian Cortes (D)

Statewide executive officials

- Bob Ferguson, Attorney General of Washington

Organizations

- American Federation of Teachers
- Planned Parenthood Alliance Avdvocates
- Washington State Building & Construction Trades Council

=== Results ===
Washington's 18th State Senate District, 2024
Primary election
Party	Candidate	Votes	%
Democratic	Adrian Cortes	20,066	46.2
Republican	Brad Benton	13,783	31.8
Republican	Greg Cheney	9,525	21.9
Write-in		39	0.1
Total votes		43,413	100.0
General election
Democratic	Adrian Cortes	42,054	50.0
Republican	Brad Benton	41,881	49.8
Write-in		189	0.2
Total votes		84,124	100.0

== District 19 ==
2024 Washington's 19th legislative district Senate election
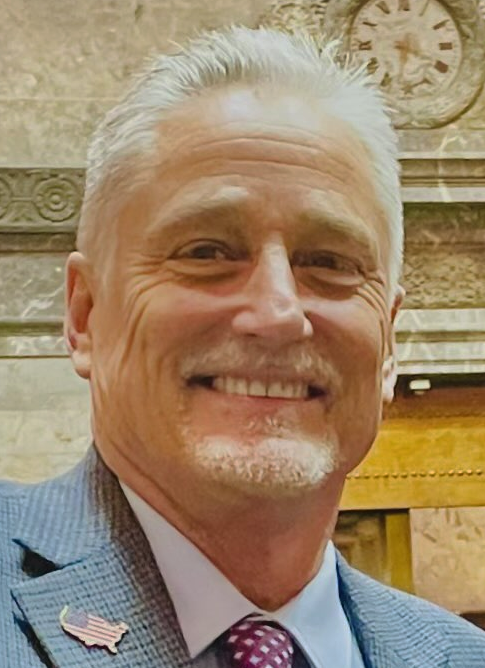

Nominee	Jeff Wilson	Andi Day
Party	Republican	Democratic
Popular vote	48,577	30,686
Percentage	61.2%	38.7%
- Results by preinct Wilson: 50–60% 60–70% 70–80% 80–90% Day: 50–60% 60–70% 70–80% Tie: 40–50% No data
State Senator before election
Jeff Wilson
Republican
Elected State Senator
Jeff Wilson
Republican

=== Candidates ===
- Andi Day (Democratic)
- Jeff Wilson (Republican), incumbent state senator

=== Results ===
Washington's 19th State Senate District, 2024
Primary election
Party	Candidate	Votes	%
Republican	Jeff Wilson (incumbent)	25,826	60.1
Democratic	Andi Day	17,081	39.8
Write-in		65	0.2
Total votes		42,972	100.0
General election
Republican	Jeff Wilson (incumbent)	48,577	61.2
Democratic	Andi Day	30,686	38.7
Write-in		74	0.1
Total votes		79,337	100.0

== District 20 ==
2024 Washington's 20th legislative district Senate election
Nominee	John Braun
Party	Republican
Popular vote	69,075
Percentage	96.5%
State Senator before election
John Braun
Republican
Elected State Senator
John Braun
Republican

=== Candidates ===
- John Braun (Republican), incumbent state senator and Minority Leader of the Washington State Senate

=== Results ===
Washington's 20th State Senate District, 2024
Primary election
Party	Candidate	Votes	%
Republican	John Braun (incumbent)	35,738	95.4
Write-in		1,723	4.6
Total votes		37,461	100.0
General election
Republican	John Braun (incumbent)	69,075	96.5
Write-in		2,485	3.5
Total votes		71,560	100.0

== District 22 ==
2024 Washington's 22nd legislative district Senate election

Nominee	Jessica Bateman	Bob Iyall
Party	Democratic	Democratic
Popular vote	54,875	21,288
Percentage	70.6%	27.4%
State Senator before election
Sam Hunt
Democratic
Elected State Senator
Jessica Bateman
Democratic

The incumbent is Democrat Sam Hunt, who is retiring.

=== Candidates ===
- Jessica Bateman (Democratic), state representative
- Bob Iyall (Democratic), Olympia port commissioner

==== Eliminated in primary ====
- Tela Hogle (Democratic), baker and music teacher

=== Endorsements ===
Jessica Bateman (D)

Federal officials

- Marilyn Strickland, U.S. representative

State executive officials

- Denny Heck, lieutenant governor of Washington

State legislators

- Sam Hunt, incumbent state senator

=== Results ===
Washington's 22nd State Senate District, 2024
Primary election
Party	Candidate	Votes	%
Democratic	Jessica Bateman	29,047	68.3
Democratic	Bob Iyall	8,735	20.5
Democratic	Tela Hogle	3,597	8.5
Write-in		1,146	2.7
Total votes		42,525	100.0
General election
Democratic	Jessica Bateman	54,875	70.6
Democratic	Bob Iyall	21,288	27.4
Write-in		1,618	2.1
Total votes		77,781	100.0

== District 23 ==
2024 Washington's 23rd legislative district Senate election
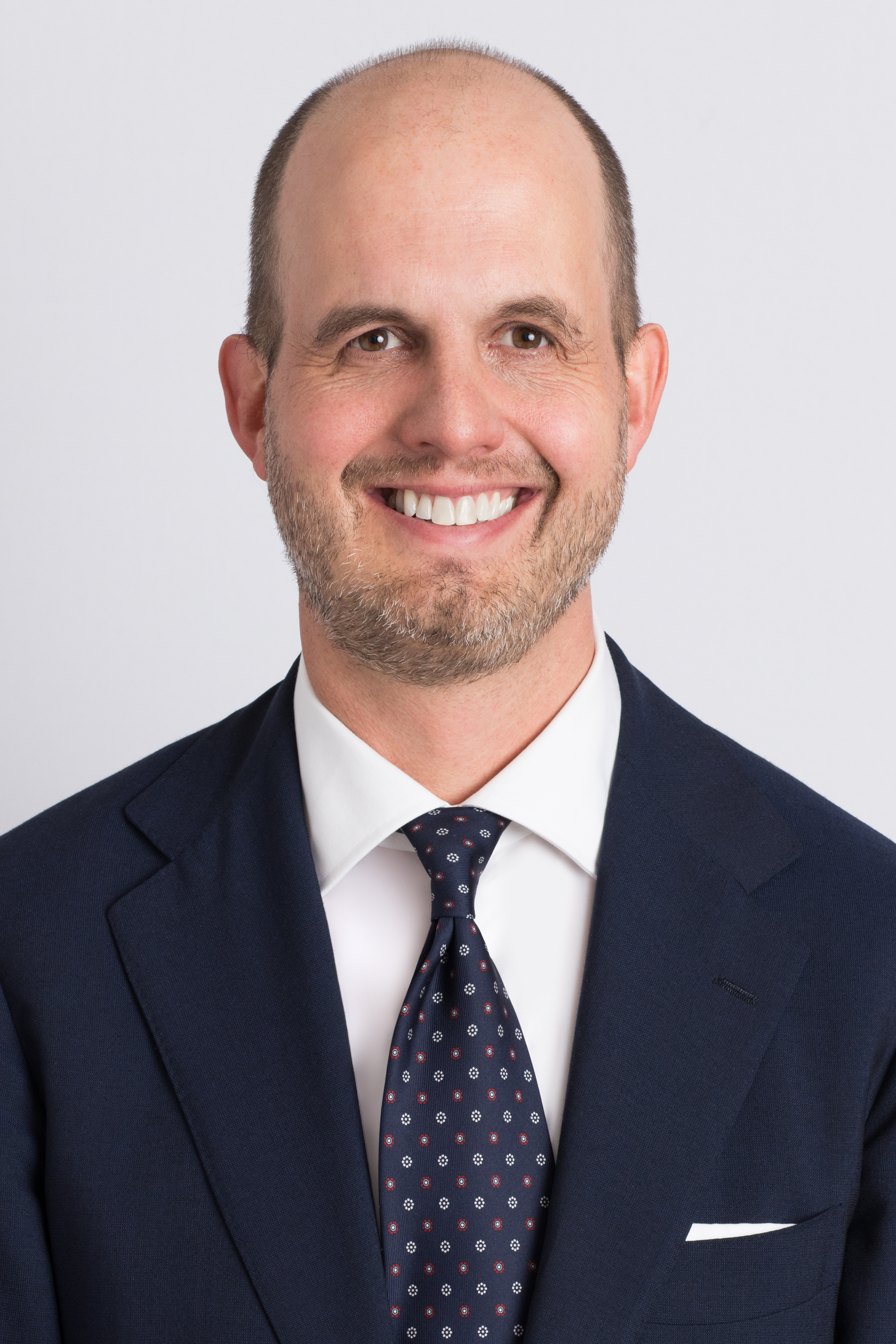

Nominee	Drew Hansen	Lance Byrd
Party	Democratic	Republican
Popular vote	55,296	30,668
Percentage	64.3%	35.6%
- Results by precinct Hansen: 50–60% 60–70% 70–80% 80–90% Byrd: 50–60% 60–70%
State Senator before election
Drew Hansen
Democratic
Elected State Senator
Drew Hansen
Democratic

=== Candidates ===
- Lance Byrd (Republican), senior technical program manager
- Drew Hansen (Democratic), incumbent state senator

==== Eliminated in primary ====
- Ace Haynes (Republican), precinct committee officer

=== Results ===
Washington's 23rd State Senate District, 2024
Primary election
Party	Candidate	Votes	%
Democratic	Drew Hansen (incumbent)	32,553	67.1
Republican	Lance Byrd	14,031	28.9
Republican	Ace Haynes	1,866	3.9
Write-in		55	0.1
Total votes		48,505	100.0
General election
Democratic	Drew Hansen (incumbent)	55,296	64.3
Republican	Lance Byrd	30,668	35.6
Write-in		89	0.1
Total votes		86,053	100.0

== District 24 ==
2024 Washington's 24th legislative district Senate election

Nominee	Mike Chapman	Marcia Kelbon
Party	Democratic	Republican
Popular vote	51,889	42,695
Percentage	54.8%	45.1%
- Results by precinct Chapman: 40–50% 50–60% 60–70% 70–80% 80–90% Kelbon: 40–50% 50–60% 60–70% 70–80% 80–90% No data
State Senator before election
Kevin Van De Wege
Democratic
Elected State Senator
Mike Chapman
Democratic

The incumbent is Democrat Kevin Van De Wege, who retired to run for Washington Public Lands Commissioner.

=== Candidates ===
- Mike Chapman (Democratic), state representative
- Marcia Kelbon (Republican), lawyer

==== Eliminated in primary ====
- James Russell (Democratic)

=== Results ===
Washington's 24th State Senate District, 2024
Primary election
Party	Candidate	Votes	%
Democratic	Mike Chapman	31,244	54.0
Republican	Marcia Kelbon	23,701	41.0
Democratic	James Russell	2,859	4.9
Write-in		36	0.1
Total votes		57,840	100.0
General election
Democratic	Mike Chapman	51,889	54.8
Republican	Marcia Kelbon	42,695	45.1
Write-in		120	0.1
Total votes		94,704	100.0

== District 25 ==
2024 Washington's 25th legislative district Senate election
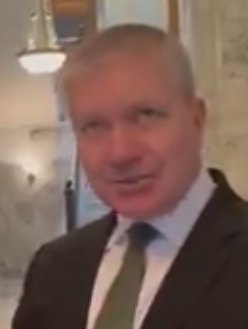

Nominee	Chris Gildon	Kenneth King
Party	Republican	Democratic
Popular vote	41,822	30,551
Percentage	57.7%	42.2%
- Results by precinct Gildon: 50–60% 60–70% 70–80% King: 50–60% 60–70% Tie: 50% No data
State Senator before election
Chris Gildon
Republican
Elected State Senator
Chris Gildon
Republican

=== Candidates ===
- Chris Gildon (Republican), incumbent state senator
- Kenneth King (Democratic)

=== Results ===
Washington's 25th State Senate District, 2024
Primary election
Party	Candidate	Votes	%
Republican	Chris Gildon (incumbent)	20,399	58.9
Democratic	Kenneth King	14,179	41.0
Write-in		29	0.1
Total votes		34,607	100.0
General election
Republican	Chris Gildon (incumbent)	41,822	57.7
Democratic	Kenneth King	30,551	42.2
Write-in		73	0.1
Total votes		72,446	100.0

== District 27 ==
2024 Washington's 27th legislative district Senate election

Nominee	Yasmin Trudeau	Carole Sue Braaten
Party	Democratic	Republican
Popular vote	51,838	20,270
Percentage	71.8%	28.1%
State Senator before election
Yasmin Trudeau
Democratic
Elected State Senator
Yasmin Trudeau
Democratic

=== Candidates ===
- Carol Sue Braaten (Republican)
- Yasmin Trudeau (Democratic), incumbent state senator

=== Results ===
Washington's 27th State Senate District, 2024
Primary election
Party	Candidate	Votes	%
Democratic	Yasmin Trudeau (incumbent)	27,333	73.8
Republican	Carol Sue Braaten	9,585	25.9
Write-in		104	0.3
Total votes		37,022	100.0
General election
Democratic	Yasmin Trudeau (incumbent)	51,838	71.8
Republican	Carol Sue Braaten	20,270	28.1
Write-in		123	0.2
Total votes		72,231	100.0

== District 28 ==
2024 Washington's 28th legislative district Senate election

Nominee	T'wina Nobles	Maia Espinoza
Party	Democratic	Republican
Popular vote	32,120	27,540
Percentage	53.8%	46.1%
- Nobles: 50–60% 60–70% 70–80% Espinoza: 40–50% 50–60% 60–70% 70–80% No data
State Senator before election
T'wina Nobles
Democratic
Elected State Senator
T'wina Nobles
Democratic

=== Candidates ===
- Maia Espinoza (Republican), candidate for Washington Superintendent of Public Instruction in 2020
- T'wina Nobles (Democratic), incumbent state senator

=== Results ===
Washington's 28th State Senate District, 2024
Primary election
Party	Candidate	Votes	%
Democratic	T'wina Nobles (incumbent)	16,724	54.8
Republican	Maia Espinoza	13,759	45.1
Write-in		62	0.2
Total votes		30,545	100.0
General election
Democratic	T'wina Nobles (incumbent)	32,120	53.8
Republican	Maia Espinoza	27,540	46.1
Write-in		86	0.1
Total votes		59,746	100.0

== District 39 ==
2024 Washington's 39th legislative district Senate election
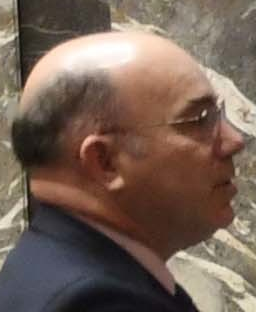

Nominee	Keith Wagoner	John Snow
Party	Republican	Democratic
Popular vote	49,778	32,481
Percentage	60.5%	39.5%
State Senator before election
Keith Wagoner
Republican
Elected State Senator
Keith Wagoner
Republican

=== Candidates ===
- John Snow (Democratic), Navy veteran
- Keith Wagoner (Republican), incumbent state senator

==== Eliminated in primary ====
- Tim McDonald (Democratic), former Arlington School Board member

=== Endorsements ===
John Snow (D)

Political parties

- Skagit County Democratic Party
- Snohomish County Democratic Party
- 39th Legislative District Democratic Party
Keith Wagoner (R)

Political parties

- Skagit County Republican Party

Newspapers

- The Seattle Times

=== Results ===
Washington's 39th State Senate District, 2024
Primary election
Party	Candidate	Votes	%
Republican	Keith Wagoner (incumbent)	24,358	59.7
Democratic	John Snow	12,569	30.8
Democratic	Tim McDonald	3,849	9.4
Write-in		40	0.1
Total votes		40,816	100.0
General election
Republican	Keith Wagoner (incumbent)	49,778	60.5
Democratic	John Snow	32,481	39.5
Write-in		83	0.1
Total votes		82,342	100.0

== District 40 ==
2024 Washington's 40th legislative district Senate election

Nominee	Liz Lovelett	Charles Carrell
Party	Democratic	Republican
Popular vote	61,930	27,038
Percentage	69.5%	30.4%
State Senator before election
Liz Lovelett
Democratic
Elected State Senator
Liz Lovelett
Democratic

=== Candidates ===
- Charles Carrell (Republican), former Snohomish Country Sherriff's Office employee
- Liz Lovelett (Democratic), incumbent state senator

=== Results ===
Washington's 40th State Senate District, 2024
Primary election
Party	Candidate	Votes	%
Democratic	Liz Lovelett (incumbent)	34,724	71.1
Republican	Charles Carrell	14,015	28.7
Write-in		92	0.2
Total votes		48,831	100.0
General election
Democratic	Liz Lovelett (incumbent)	61,930	69.5
Republican	Charles Carrell	27,038	30.4
Write-in		118	0.1
Total votes		89,086	100.0

== District 41 ==
2024 Washington's 41st legislative district Senate election

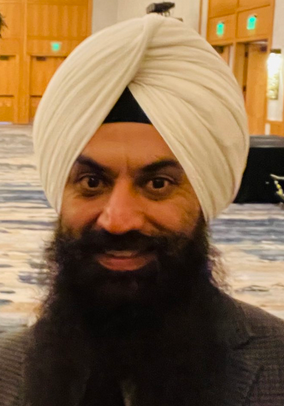
Nominee	Lisa Wellman	Jaskaran Singh Sarao
Party	Democratic	Republican
Popular vote	51,876	23,093
Percentage	69.0%	30.7%
- Results by precinct Wellman: 40–50% 50–60% 60–70% 70–80% 80–90%
State Senator before election
Lisa Wellman
Democratic
Elected State Senator
Lisa Wellman
Democratic

=== Candidates ===
- Jaskaran Singh Sarao (Republican), landlord
- Lisa Wellman (Democratic), incumbent state senator

=== Results ===
Washington's 41st State Senate District, 2024
Primary election
Party	Candidate	Votes	%
Democratic	Lisa Wellman (incumbent)	27,935	73.3
Republican	Jaskaran Singh Sarao	10,059	26.4
Write-in		97	0.3
Total votes		38,091	100.0
General election
Democratic	Lisa Wellman (incumbent)	51,876	69.0
Republican	Jaskaran Singh Sarao	23,093	30.7
Write-in		167	0.2
Total votes		75,136	100.0

== District 49 ==
2024 Washington's 49th legislative district Senate election

Nominee	Annette Cleveland	Lucia Worthington
Party	Democratic	Republican
Popular vote	42,148	25,932
Percentage	61.8%	38.0%
- Results by precinct Cleveland: 50–60% 60–70% 70–80% Worthington: 50–60% 60–70%
State Senator before election
Annette Cleveland
Democratic
Elected State Senator
Annette Cleveland
Democratic

=== Candidates ===
- Annette Cleveland (Democratic), incumbent state senator
- Lucia Worthington (Republican), management consultant and Independent candidate for WA-03 in 2016

=== Results ===
Washington's 49th State Senate District, 2024
Primary election
Party	Candidate	Votes	%
Democratic	Annette Cleveland (incumbent)	20,058	62.7
Republican	Lucia Worthington	11,844	37.0
Write-in		76	0.2
Total votes		31,978	100.0
General election
Democratic	Annette Cleveland (incumbent)	42,148	61.8
Republican	Lucia Worthington	25,932	38.0
Write-in		170	0.3
Total votes		68,250	100.0

== See also ==
- 2024 United States elections
- 2024 United States House of Representatives elections in Washington
- 2024 United States Senate election in Washington
- 2024 Washington gubernatorial election
- 2024 Washington Attorney General election
- 2024 Washington House of Representatives election
