= 2016 Washington State Senate election =

Washington State Senate elections, 2016
- November 8, 2016

26 seats of the Washington State Senate 25 seats needed for a majority
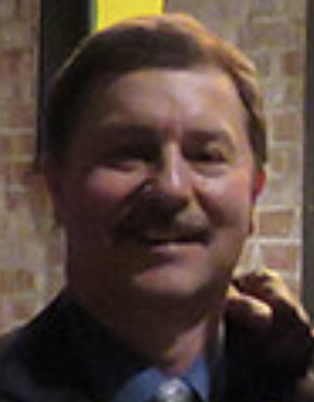

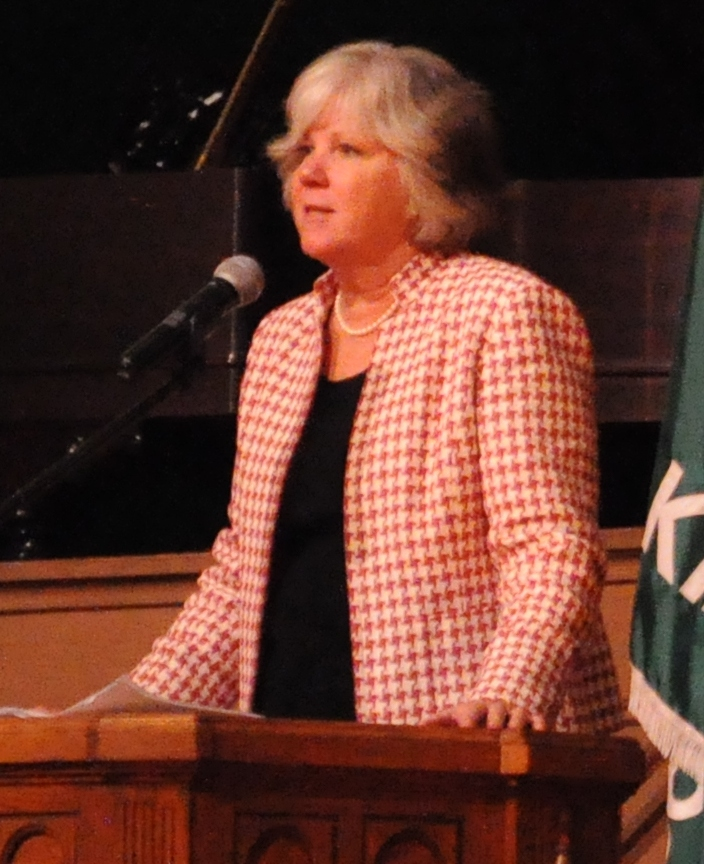
	Majority party	Minority party
Leader	Mark Schoesler	Sharon Nelson
Party	Majority Coalition Caucus (Note: Democrat Tim Sheldon caucused with all 25 Republicans to allow republicans to hold the majority.)	Democratic
Leader's seat	9th-Ritzville	34th-Vashon
Last election	26	23
Seats won	25	24
Seat change	▼1	▲1
Popular vote	787,912	708,898
Percentage	50.86%	45.82%
- Results: Democratic gain Republican hold Democratic hold No election
Majority Leader before election
Mark Schoesler
Republican (Coalition)
Elected Majority Leader
Mark Schoesler
Republican (Coalition)

The 2016 Washington State Senate elections is one of the biennial legislative elections in Washington in which about half of the state's 49 legislative districts choose a state senator for a four-year term to the Washington State Senate. The other half of state senators are chosen in the next biennial election, so that about half of the senators, along with all the members of the Washington State House of Representatives, are elected every two years. 25 seats are regularly scheduled to be up this cycle, along with 1 additional seat holding a special election to fill an unexpired term: the 36th district, currently held by appointed Senator Reuven Carlyle, whose former incumbent Jeanne Kohl-Welles vacated the seat.

A top two primary election on August 9, 2016 determines which candidates appear on the November ballot. Candidates were allowed to declare a party preference. The general election took place on November 8, 2016.

The 2016 election maintained effective Republican control of the Senate, because Democrat Tim Sheldon caucused with the Republicans.

== Overview ==
Washington State Senate election, 2016
Party	Votes	Percentage	Seats	+/–
Republican	787,912	50.86%	25 (Note: Includes Democrat Tim Sheldon (35th-Potlatch) who caucuses with Republicans, allowing them to retain the majority.)	▼1
Democratic	709,898	45.82%	24	▲1
Libertarian	28,405	1.83%	0	0
Independent	22,986	1.48%	0	0
Totals	1,549,201	100.0%	49	—

=== Composition ===
Races by type	Seats
Democratic Incumbent uncontested	5
Democratic Incumbent vs. Democrat	0
Democratic Incumbent vs. Republican	5
Contested, Open Seats (Note: Including open seats with two candidates of the same party competing in the general election.)	6
Republican Incumbent vs. Democrat	5
Republican Incumbent vs. Republican	0
Republican Incumbent uncontested	5

== Predictions ==
Source	Ranking	As of
Governing	Lean R	October 12, 2016

== Results ==
=== District 1 ===
Washington's 1st legislative district election, 2016
Primary election
Party	Candidate	Votes	%
Republican	Mindie Wirth	11,959	40.0
Democratic	Guy Palumbo	9,369	31.3
Democratic	Luis Moscoso	8,568	28.7
Total votes		29,896	100.0
General election
Democratic	Guy Palumbo	40,758	56.9
Republican	Mindie Wirth	30,850	43.1
Total votes		71,608	100.0
Democratic hold			

=== District 2 ===
Washington's 2nd legislative district election, 2016
Primary election
Party	Candidate	Votes	%
Republican	Randi Becker (incumbent)	14,103	58.1
Democratic	Marilyn Rasmussen	6,517	26.8
Democratic	Tamborine Borrelli	3,680	15.1
Total votes		24,300	100.0
General election
Republican	Randi Becker (incumbent)	36,739	61.3
Democratic	Marilyn Rasmussen	23,149	38.7
Total votes		59,888	100.0
Republican hold			

=== District 3 ===
Washington's 3rd legislative district election, 2016
Primary election
Party	Candidate	Votes	%
Democratic	Andy Billig (incumbent)	14,751	73.1
Libertarian	James R. Apker	5,428	26.9
Total votes		20,179	100.0
General election
Democratic	Andy Billig (incumbent)	33,777	67.3
Libertarian	James R. Apker	16,395	32.7
Total votes		50,172	100.0
Democratic hold			

=== District 4 ===
Washington's 4th legislative district election, 2016
Primary election
Party	Candidate	Votes	%
Republican	Mike Padden (incumbent)	21,255	100.0
General election
Republican	Mike Padden (incumbent)	55,715	100.0
Republican hold			

=== District 5 ===
Washington's 5th legislative district election, 2016
Primary election
Party	Candidate	Votes	%
Democratic	Mark Mullet (incumbent)	15,199	50.7
Republican	Chad Magendanz	14,787	49.3
Total votes		29,986	100.0
General election
Democratic	Mark Mullet (incumbent)	37,342	50.3
Republican	Chad Magendanz	36,826	49.7
Total votes		74,168	100.0
Democratic hold			

=== District 9 ===
Washington's 9th legislative district election, 2016
Primary election
Party	Candidate	Votes	%
Republican	Mark Schoesler (incumbent)	16,271	100.0
General election
Republican	Mark Schoesler (incumbent)	41,951	100.0
Republican hold			

=== District 10 ===
Washington's 10th legislative district election, 2016
Primary election
Party	Candidate	Votes	%
Republican	Barbara Bailey (incumbent)	18,860	51.5
Democratic	Angie Homola	13,928	38.0
Democratic	Nick Petrish	3,851	10.5
Total votes		36,639	100.0
General election
Republican	Barbara Bailey (incumbent)	42,309	56.7
Democratic	Angie Homola	32,309	43.3
Total votes		74,618	100.0
Republican hold			

=== District 11 ===
Washington's 11th legislative district election, 2016
Primary election
Party	Candidate	Votes	%
Democratic	Bob Hasegawa (incumbent)	15,283	79.0
Libertarian	Dennis Price	4,058	21.0
Total votes		19,341	100.0
General election
Democratic	Bob Hasegawa (incumbent)	38,785	76.4
Libertarian	Dennis Price	12,010	23.6
Total votes		50,795	100.0
Democratic hold			

=== District 12 ===
Washington's 12th legislative district election, 2016
Primary election
Party	Candidate	Votes	%
Republican	Brad Hawkins	16,723	66.2
Republican	Jon Wyss	8,538	33.8
Total votes		25,261	100.0
General election
Republican	Brad Hawkins	30,882	56.0
Republican	Jon Wyss	24,258	44.0
Total votes		55,140	100.0
Republican hold			

=== District 14 ===
Washington's 14th legislative district election, 2016
Primary election
Party	Candidate	Votes	%
Republican	Curtis King (incumbent)	14,153	69.8
Republican	Amanda Richards	6,132	30.2
Total votes		20,285	100.0
General election
Republican	Curtis King (incumbent)	31,156	61.0
Republican	Amanda Richards (Note: Listed on ballot as an Independent Republican.)	19,900	39.0
Total votes		51,056	100.0
Republican hold			

=== District 16 ===
Washington's 16th legislative district election, 2016
Primary election
Party	Candidate	Votes	%
Republican	Maureen Walsh	16,044	100.0
General election
Republican	Maureen Walsh	40,354	100.0
Republican hold			

=== District 17 ===
Washington's 17th legislative district election, 2016
Primary election
Party	Candidate	Votes	%
Republican	Lynda Wilson	11,603	50.1
Democratic	Tim Probst	11,553	49.9
Total votes		23,156	100.0
General election
Republican	Lynda Wilson	32,766	55.1
Democratic	Tim Probst (Note: Listed on ballot as an Independent Democrat.)	26,686	44.9
Total votes		59,452	100.0
Republican hold			

=== District 18 ===
Washington's 18th legislative district election, 2016
Primary election
Party	Candidate	Votes	%
Republican	Ann Rivers (incumbent)	16,717	60.2
Democratic	Eric K. Holt	11,029	37.8
Total votes		24,300	100.0
General election
Republican	Ann Rivers (incumbent)	45,316	63.8
Democratic	Eric K. Holt	25,699	36.2
Total votes		71,015	100.0
Republican hold			

=== District 19 ===
Washington's 19th legislative district election, 2016
Primary election
Party	Candidate	Votes	%
Democratic	Dean Takko (incumbent)	14,848	57.7
Republican	Sue Kuehl Pederson	10,909	42.3
Total votes		25,757	100.0
General election
Democratic	Dean Takko (incumbent)	30,850	55.2
Republican	Sue Kuehl Pederson (Note: Listed on ballot as an Independent Republican.)	25,064	44.8
Total votes		55,914	100.0
Democratic hold			

=== District 20 ===
Washington's 20th legislative district election, 2016
Primary election
Party	Candidate	Votes	%
Republican	John E. Braun (incumbent)	20,063	100.0
General election
Republican	John E. Braun (incumbent)	49,936	100.0
Republican hold			

=== District 22 ===
Washington's 22nd legislative district election, 2016
Primary election
Party	Candidate	Votes	%
Democratic	Sam Hunt	17,992	55.4
Independent	Steve Owens	6,934	21.4
Democratic	Erik Lee	4,872	15.0
Democratic	Spencer Baldwin	2,662	8.2
Total votes		32,460	100.0
General election
Democratic	Sam Hunt	45,882	66.6
Independent	Steve Owens	22,986	33.4
Total votes		68,868	100.0
Democratic hold			

=== District 23 ===
Washington's 23rd legislative district election, 2016
Primary election
Party	Candidate	Votes	%
Democratic	Christine Rolfes (incumbent)	22,794	100.0
General election
Democratic	Christine Rolfes (incumbent)	51,541	100.0
Democratic hold			

=== District 24 ===
Washington's 24th legislative district election, 2016
Primary election
Party	Candidate	Votes	%
Democratic	Kevin Van De Wege	21,700	60.8
Republican	Danille Turissini	14,016	39.2
Total votes		35,716	100.0
General election
Democratic	Kevin Van De Wege	40,808	56.6
Republican	Danille Turissini (Note: Listed on ballot as an Independent Republican.)	31,342	43.4
Total votes		72,150	100.0
Democratic hold			

=== District 25 ===
Washington's 25th legislative district election, 2016
Primary election
Party	Candidate	Votes	%
Republican	Hans Zeiger	14,492	59.4
Democratic	Karl Mecklenburg	9,912	40.6
Total votes		24,404	100.0
General election
Republican	Hans Zeiger	35,138	59.3
Democratic	Karl Mecklenburg	24,088	40.7
Total votes		59,226	100.0
Republican hold			

=== District 27 ===
Washington's 27th legislative district election, 2016
Primary election
Party	Candidate	Votes	%
Democratic	Jeannie Darneille (incumbent)	15,141	62.1
Republican	Greg Taylor	6,356	26.1
Democratic	Martin Cline	2,882	11.8
Total votes		24,379	100.0
General election
Democratic	Jeannie Darneille (incumbent)	40,241	69.3
Republican	Greg Taylor	17,859	30.7
Total votes		58,100	100.0
Democratic hold			

=== District 28 ===
Washington's 28th legislative district election, 2016
Primary election
Party	Candidate	Votes	%
Republican	Steve O'Ban (incumbent)	14,229	53.6
Democratic	Marisa Peloquin	12,309	46.4
Total votes		26,538	100.0
General election
Republican	Steve O'Ban (incumbent)	30,139	52.9
Democratic	Marisa Peloquin	26,835	47.1
Total votes		56,974	100.0
Republican hold			

=== District 36 ===
Washington's 36th legislative district election, 2016
Primary election
Party	Candidate	Votes	%
Democratic	Reuven Carlyle (incumbent)	34,600	100.0
General election
Democratic	Reuven Carlyle (incumbent)	72,385	100.0
Democratic hold			

=== District 39 ===
Washington's 39th legislative district election, 2016
Primary election
Party	Candidate	Votes	%
Republican	Kirk Pearson (incumbent)	19,810	100.0
General election
Republican	Kirk Pearson (incumbent)	50,942	100.0
Republican hold			

=== District 40 ===
Washington's 40th legislative district election, 2016
Primary election
Party	Candidate	Votes	%
Democratic	Kevin Ranker (incumbent)	21,404	67.4
Republican	Daniel R. Miller	10,377	32.6
Total votes		31,781	100.0
General election
Democratic	Kevin Ranker (incumbent)	47,108	67.1
Republican	Daniel R. Miller	23,081	32.9
Total votes		70,189	100.0
Democratic hold			

=== District 41 ===
Washington's 41st legislative district election, 2016
Primary election
Party	Candidate	Votes	%
Democratic	Lisa Wellman	14,800	48.8
Republican	Steve Litzow (incumbent)	14,344	47.3
Libertarian	Bryan Simonson	1,189	3.9
Total votes		30,333	100.0
General election
Democratic	Lisa Wellman	37,107	51.9
Republican	Steve Litzow (incumbent)	34,446	48.1
Total votes		71,553	100.0
Democratic gain from Republican			

=== District 49 ===
Washington's 49th legislative district election, 2016
Primary election
Party	Candidate	Votes	%
Democratic	Annette Cleveland (incumbent)	12,581	56.9
Republican	Lewis Gerhardt	6,980	31.5
Democratic	Vaughn Gregor Henderson	1,366	6.2
Independent	Justin M. Forsman	1,194	5.4
Total votes		22,121	100.0
General election
Democratic	Annette Cleveland (incumbent)	34,548	62.3
Republican	Lewis Gerhardt	20,943	37.7
Total votes		55,491	100.0
Democratic hold			
