= 2012 Washington State Senate election =

Washington State Senate elections, 2012
- November 6, 2012

26 seats of the Washington State Senate 25 seats needed for a majority
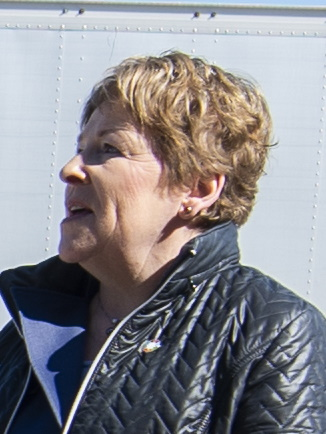

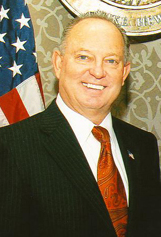
	Majority party	Minority party
Leader	Lisa Brown (retired)	Mike Hewitt
Party	Democratic	Republican
Leader's seat	3rd-Spokane	16th-Walla Walla
Last election	27	22
Seats won	26	23
Seat change	▼1	▲1
- Results: Democratic gain Republican gain Democratic hold Republican hold No election
Majority Leader before election
Lisa Brown
Democratic
Elected Majority Leader
Rodney Tom
Democratic

The 2012 Washington State Senate elections took place on November 6, 2012. Twenty-five of Washington's forty-nine state senators were elected. Each state legislative district has one senator elected to a four-year term, but state senate elections alternate so that about half of the senators are elected in presidential election years (e.g., 2008, 2012) and the other half are elected in non-presidential even numbered election years (e.g., 2010, 2014). A top two primary election on August 7, 2012 determined which candidates appear on the November ballot. Candidates were allowed to self-declare a party preference.

25 seats were regularly scheduled to be up this cycle, along with 1 additional seat holding a special election to fill an unexpired term: the 46th district, held by appointed Senator David Frockt, whose former incumbent Scott White vacated the seat.

Democrats gained the 5th district seat and Republicans gained the 10th and 25th district seats for a net gain of one seat for the Republicans. While the Democratic Party won a majority of the seats in the election, two Democratic senators joined the Republicans to form the Majority Coalition Caucus on December 10, 2012, giving Republicans an effective majority of seats.

== Overview ==
Washington State Senate elections, 2012
Party	Seats	+/–
Democratic	12	▼1
Republican	14	▲1
Independent	0	0
Total	26	

=== Composition ===
Elections	Seats
Democratic Incumbent and Uncontested	2
Races w/ two Democrats in General	1
Republican Incumbent and Uncontested	4
Races w/ two Republicans in General	1
Contested, Open Seats (Note: Including the 27th district, an open seat with two Democrats running against each other in the general election.)	7

On December 10, 2012, two Democratic Senators (Note: On December 10, Democratic Senators Sheldon and Tom announced they would caucus with the Republicans, creating a conservative coalition majority (25-24).) joined in a coalition with the Republican Caucus to form a conservative majority, called the "Majority Coalition Caucus".

Since Dec 10, 2012	Seats
Democratic	24
Mostly Republican "Majority Coalition Caucus"	25
Total	49

== Predictions ==
Source	Ranking	As of
Governing	Tossup	October 24, 2012

== Seats up for election ==
Results as reported by the Secretary of State:

=== District 1 ===
Washington's 1st legislative district election, 2012
Party	Candidate	Votes	%
Democratic	Rosemary McAuliffe (inc.)	37,316	55.49
Republican	Dawn McCravey	29,932	44.51
Total votes		67,248	100
Democratic hold			

=== District 2 ===
Washington's 2nd legislative district election, 2012
Party	Candidate	Votes	%
Republican	Randi Becker (inc.)	31,946	56.81
Democratic	Bruce L. Lachney	24,286	43.19
Total votes		56,232	100.00
Republican hold			

=== District 3 ===
Incumbent Lisa Brown did not seek another term. On November 30, 2012, Brown was selected for Governor-Elect Jay Inslee's transition team.

Washington's 3rd legislative district election, 2012
Party	Candidate	Votes	%
Democratic	Andy Billig	29,609	57.85
Republican	Nancy McLaughlin	21,576	42.15
Total votes		51,185	100.00
Democratic hold			

=== District 4 ===
Washington's 4th legislative district election, 2012
Party	Candidate	Votes	%
Republican	Mike Padden (inc.)	49,593	100.00
Republican hold			

=== District 5 ===
Original incumbent Cheryl Pflug resigned in June 2012 to take a seat on the Washington Growth Management Hearings Board. Former state senator and recurring statewide-office candidate Dino Rossi was appointed to complete her term, but redistricting moved him out of the 5th LD, making him ineligible to run for the seat in 2012.

Washington's 5th legislative district election, 2012
Party	Candidate	Votes	%
Republican	Brad Toft	30,683	45,58
Democratic	Mark Mullet	36,630	54.42
Total votes		67,313	100.00
Democratic gain from Republican			

=== District 9 ===
Washington's 9th Legislative District election, 2012
Party	Candidate	Votes	%
Republican	Mark G. Schoesler (inc.)	39,390	100.00
Republican hold			

=== District 10 ===
Washington's 10th legislative district election, 2012
Party	Candidate	Votes	%
Democratic	Mary Margaret Haugen (inc.)	33,708	47.18
Republican	Barbara Bailey	37,732	52.82
Total votes		71,440	100.00
Republican gain from Democratic			

=== District 11 ===
Incumbent Margarita Prentice was redistricted out of the 11th LD, and declined to run for election in the new district.

Washington's 11th legislative district election, 2012
Party	Candidate	Votes	%
Democratic	Bob Hasegawa	34,301	69.34
Republican	Kristin Thompson	15,170	30.66
Total votes		49,471	100.00
Democratic hold			

=== District 12 ===
Washington's 12th legislative district election, 2012
Party	Candidate	Votes	%
Republican	Linda Evans Parlette (inc.)	44,318	100.00
Republican hold			

=== District 14 ===
Washington's 14th legislative district election, 2012
Party	Candidate	Votes	%
Republican	Curtis King (inc.)	40,394	100.00
Republican hold			

=== District 16 ===
Washington's 16th legislative district election, 2012
Party	Candidate	Votes	%
Republican	Mike Hewitt (inc.)	32,717	69.74
Democratic	Scott Nettles	14,197	30.26
Total votes		46,914	100.00
Republican hold			

=== District 17 ===
Washington's 17th legislative district election, 2012
Party	Candidate	Votes	%
Republican	Don Benton (inc.)	27,542 (Note: Hand recount)	50.07
Democratic	Tim Probst (Note: Hand recount)	27,468	49.93
Total votes		54,864	100.00
Republican hold			

=== District 18 ===
Washington's 18th legislative district election, 2012
Party	Candidate	Votes	%
Republican	Ann Rivers (inc.)	42,924	67.86
Democratic	Ralph Schmidt	20,330	32.14
Total votes		63,254	100.00
Republican hold			

=== District 19 ===
Washington's 19th legislative district election, 2012
Party	Candidate	Votes	%
Democratic	Brian Hatfield (inc.)	34,590	62.16
Republican	Rick Winsman	21,056	37.84
Total votes		55,646	100.00
Democratic hold			

=== District 20 ===
Washington's 20th legislative district election, 2012
Party	Candidate	Votes	%
Republican	Dan Swecker (inc.)	24,075	44.57
Republican	John Braun	29,943	55.43
Total votes		54,018	100.00
Republican hold			

=== District 22 ===
Washington's 22nd legislative district election, 2012
Party	Candidate	Votes	%
Democratic	Karen Fraser (inc.)	50,389	100.00
Democratic hold			

=== District 23 ===
Washington's 23rd legislative district election, 2012
Party	Candidate	Votes	%
Democratic	Christine Rolfes (inc.)	43,305	65.08
Republican	Bret A. Treadwell	23,235	34.92
Total votes		66,540	100.00
Democratic hold			

=== District 24 ===
Washington's 24th legislative district election, 2012
Party	Candidate	Votes	%
Democratic	Jim Hargrove (inc.)	44,417	65.44
Independent	Larry Carter	23,455	34.56
Total votes		67,872	100.00
Democratic hold			

=== District 25 ===
Incumbent Jim Kastama ran for Washington Secretary of State, making him ineligible to run for reelection. He did not win the state position.

Washington's 25th legislative district election, 2012
Party	Candidate	Votes	%
Democratic	Eric Herde	21,517	38.26
Republican	Bruce Dammeier	34,715	61.74
Total votes		56,232	100.00
Republican gain from Democratic			

=== District 27 ===
Incumbent Debbie Regala retired at the end of her term.

Washington's 27th legislative district election, 2012
Party	Candidate	Votes	%
Democratic	Jeannie Darneille	30,939	57.29
Democratic	John R. Connelly	23,068	42.71
Total votes		54,007	100.00
Democratic hold			

=== District 28 ===
Washington's 28th legislative district election, 2012
Party	Candidate	Votes	%
Republican	Mike Carrell (inc.)	32,146	58.40
Democratic	Yoshie Wong	22,896	41.60
Total votes		55,042	100.00
Republican hold			

=== District 39 ===
Incumbent Val Stevens retired at the end of her term.

Washington's 39th legislative district election, 2012
Party	Candidate	Votes	%
Republican	Kirk Pearson	33,449	57.62
Democratic	Scott Olson	24,603	42.38
Total votes		58,052	100.00
Republican hold			

=== District 40 ===
Washington's 40th legislative district election, 2012
Party	Candidate	Votes	%
Independent Republican	John Swapp	23,959	37.07
Democratic	Kevin Ranker (inc.)	40,677	62.93
Total votes		64,636	100.00
Democratic hold			

=== District 41 ===
Washington's 41st legislative district election, 2012
Party	Candidate	Votes	%
Republican	Steve Litzow (inc.)	37,314	54.04
Democratic	Maureen Judge	31,734	45.96
Total votes		69,048	100.00
Republican hold			

=== District 46 ===
Washington's 46th legislative district election, 2012
Party	Candidate	Votes	%
Democratic	David Frockt (inc.)	56,124	100.00
Democratic hold			

=== District 49 ===
Incumbent Craig Pridemore ran for Washington State Auditor, making him ineligible to run for reelection. He did not win the state position.

Washington's 49th legislative district election, 2012
Party	Candidate	Votes	%
Democratic	Annette Cleveland	30,390	58.42
Republican	Eileen Qutub	21,634	41.58
Total votes		52,024	100.00
Democratic hold			
