= Ranker (disambiguation) =

Ranker may refer to:

- Ranker, a digital media company located in Los Angeles
- Gentleman ranker, an enlisted soldier who may have been a former officer
- Last Ranker, a role-playing video game developed by imageepoch and published by Capcom for the PlayStation
- Rankers, soils developed over non-calcareous material, usually rock
- Kevin Ranker, an American politician who is a member of the Democratic Party
