= Adrian Cortes =

Adrian Cortes may refer to:

- Adrián Cortés, Mexican football coach and player
- Adrian Cortes (politician), member of the Washington State Senate
