= Mike Armstrong (politician) =

American politician from Washington

Member of the Washington House of Representatives from the 12th district
- In office January 8, 2001 – January 14, 2013
- Preceded by: Linda Evans Parlette
- Succeeded by: Brad Hawkins

Personal details
- Born: Michael Dean Armstrong; May 24, 1957 (age 69) Wenatchee, Washington, U.S.
- Party: Republican
- Spouse: Mary Ellen (Swaim) Armstrong
- Children: Abe; Cassandra; Maureen
- Education: Wenatchee Valley College (attended)
- Profession: External Affairs Director; Facilities manager Maintenance supervisor
- Website: Official

Michael Dean Armstrong (born May 24, 1957) is an American politician of the Republican Party. He was a member of the Washington House of Representatives, representing the 12th Legislative District from 2001 to 2013.
