= Linda Evans Parlette =

American politician (born 1945)

Member of the Washington Senate from the 12th district
- In office January 8, 2001 – January 9, 2017
- Preceded by: George L. Sellar
- Succeeded by: Brad Hawkins

Member of the Washington House of Representatives from the 12th district
- In office January 13, 1997 – January 8, 2001
- Preceded by: Dale Foreman
- Succeeded by: Mike Armstrong

Personal details
- Born: Linda Rae O'Neal; August 20, 1945 (age 81) Wenatchee, Washington, U.S.
- Party: Republican
- Spouse: Bob Parlette (died 2017)
- Education: Washington State University
- Website: Official

Linda Rae Evans Parlette (née O'Neal, born August 20, 1945) is an American politician of the Republican Party. She was a member of the Washington State Senate, representing the state's 12th Legislative District. She served three four-year Senate terms, after serving four years in the House of Representatives.

Evans did not seek re-election in 2016.

Parlette served as Senate Republican Caucus Chair, was a member of the Health and Long-Term Care; Ways and Means; and Rules committees, and was the ranking Republican on the Capital Budget. She is an honor graduate of Washington State School of Pharmacy, a former graduate and Board of Director of the Washington State Ag-Forestry Leadership Program, a former member of the North Central ESD board and a former Chair of the Lake Chelan School board. Parlette serves as a member of the William D. Ruckelshaus Center's advisory board, is active in Rotary and other community activities, and currently resides in Wenatchee with her husband, Bob. Together they have five grown children and three granddaughters.

== Awards ==
- 2014 Guardians of Small Business award. Presented by NFIB.
