= Ron Muzzall =

American politician from Washington

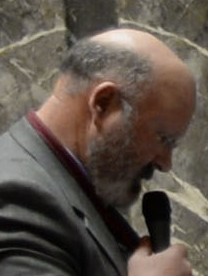

Member of the Washington State Senate from the 10th district
- Incumbent
- Assumed office October 18, 2019
- Preceded by: Barbara Bailey

Personal details
- Born: 1963 (age 62–63)
- Party: Republican
- Education: Washington State University
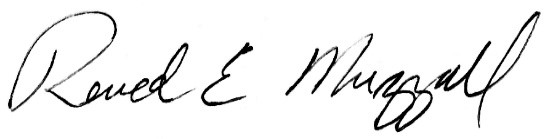
- Signature
- Website: Ron Muzzall

Ronald Edwin Muzzall (born 1963) is an American politician from Washington.

He has served as a Republican member of the Washington State Senate for Washington's tenth legislative district since October 18, 2019. He was appointed unanimously by the Skagit County Commissioners, Island County Commissioners, and Snohomish County Council to replace Barbara Bailey.
