= Brad Hawkins (politician) =

American politician from Washington

Chelan Board of County Commissioners from the 3rd district
- Incumbent
- Assumed office January 6, 2025
- Preceded by: Tiffany Gering

Member of the Washington Senate from the 12th district
- In office January 9, 2017 – January 6, 2025
- Preceded by: Linda Evans Parlette
- Succeeded by: Keith Goehner

Member of the Washington House of Representatives from the 12th district
- In office January 14, 2013 – January 9, 2017
- Preceded by: Mike Armstrong
- Succeeded by: Mike Steele

Personal details
- Born: Bradley Matthew Hawkins; November 16, 1975 (age 50) Wenatchee, Washington, U.S.
- Party: Republican
- Spouse: Shawna Hawkins
- Children: 2
- Education: Central Washington University, George Washington University
- Website: Official

Bradley Matthew Hawkins (born November 16, 1975) is an American politician of the Republican Party currently serving on the Chelan Board of County Commissioners. He was a member of the Washington State Senate from 2017 to 2025 and a former member of the Washington House of Representatives, representing the 12th Legislative District from 2013 until 2017.

== Awards ==
- 2014 Guardians of Small Business award. Presented by NFIB.

== Personal life ==
Hawkins' wife is Shawna Hawkins. They have two children. Hawkins and his family live in East Wenatchee, Washington.
