= Chris Gildon =

American politician (born 1971)

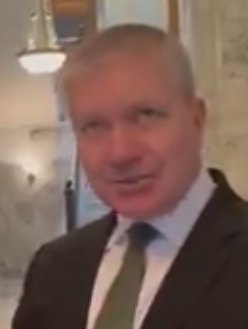
- Gildon in 2025

Member of the Washington State Senate from the 25th district
- Incumbent
- Assumed office January 11, 2021
- Preceded by: Hans Zeiger

Member of the Washington House of Representatives from the 25th district
- In office January 14, 2019 – January 11, 2021
- Preceded by: Joyce McDonald
- Succeeded by: Cyndy Jacobsen

Personal details
- Born: Christopher Don Gildon; August 14, 1971 (age 55) Odessa, Texas, U.S.
- Party: Republican
- Education: University of Texas, Webster University, National Defense University
- Occupation: Real estate broker, politician
- Website: Legislative website

Chris Gildon (born 1971) is a Republican Party politician who is the state senator for Washington's Washington's 25th legislative district. Prior to his service in the Senate, Gildon served one term in the Washington House of Representatives from 2019 to 2021.

== Legislative career ==
In addition to his legislative committee assignments, Gildon is co-chair on the board of directors for the Washington State Institute for Public Policy, which conducts nonpartisan research to inform public policymaking. He also serves on the Joint Committee on Veterans’ and Military Affairs, the Washington State Criminal Sentencing Task Force, and the Legislative-Executive WorkFirst Poverty Reduction Oversight Task Force.

== Personal life ==
Gildon and his wife, Autumn, live in Puyallup, Washington, with their two children.
