= Sharon Nelson =

American politician from Washington

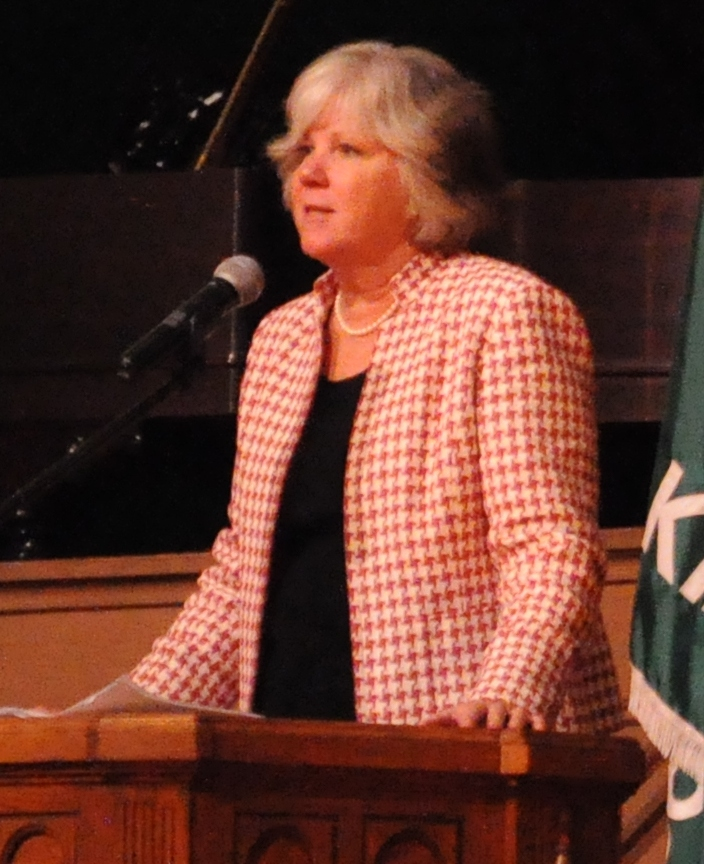
- Sharon Nelson

Majority Leader of the Washington Senate
- In office November 15, 2017 – January 14, 2019
- Preceded by: Mark Schoesler
- Succeeded by: Andy Billig

Minority Leader of the Washington Senate
- In office December 16, 2013 – November 15, 2017
- Preceded by: Ed Murray
- Succeeded by: Mark Schoesler

Member of the Washington Senate from the 34th district
- In office December 2, 2010 – January 14, 2019
- Preceded by: Joe McDermott
- Succeeded by: Joe Nguyen

Member of the Washington House of Representatives from the 34th district
- In office November 6, 2007 – December 2, 2010
- Preceded by: Joe McDermott
- Succeeded by: Joe Fitzgibbon

Personal details
- Born: Sharon Kay Nelson; 1951 (age 74–75) Park Rapids, Minnesota
- Party: Democratic
- Spouse: John R. Nelson
- Children: 2
- Education: Whitman College (BS)
- Website: Official website

Sharon Kay Nelson (born 1951) is an American politician from the state of Washington.

== Background ==
Nelson is the former Chief of Staff to then King County Council Chair Dow Constantine. She has long been a leader in the fight to protect Maury Island from the expansion of a gravel mine on the island's shore. Senator Nelson, a former Bank Executive, has lived on Maury Island since 1994 with her husband John. Sharon and John have two grown daughters, Amy and Lyssa Ann, and they live with their dog, Abby.

== Political career ==
She was first appointed to the State House of Representatives in 2007 following the elevation of Joe McDermott to the Senate. Nelson was elected to State Senate in 2010, and was sworn in on December 2, 2010. In March 2018, Nelson announced that she would retire at the end of her term.

She was the Democratic Leader of the Washington State Senate, elected to that position by her colleagues in 2013.

Nelson represented the 34th Legislative District, which includes West Seattle, Vashon Island, Maury Island, and most of North Highline and Burien.

== Awards ==
- 2009 Fuse Sizzle Award - Intercontinental Smackdown Champion.

for her leadership in the Washington State Legislature and efforts to clean up the lending industry water pollution. Presented by Fuse.

- 2009 Fuse Sizzle Award - Mother Jones. Presented by Fuse.

Washington State Senate
Preceded by Ed Murray	Minority Leader of the Washington Senate; 2013–2017	Succeeded by Mark Schoesler
Preceded by Mark Schoesler	Majority Leader of the Washington Senate; 2017–2019	Succeeded by Andy Billig
