= Perry Dozier =

American politician from Washington

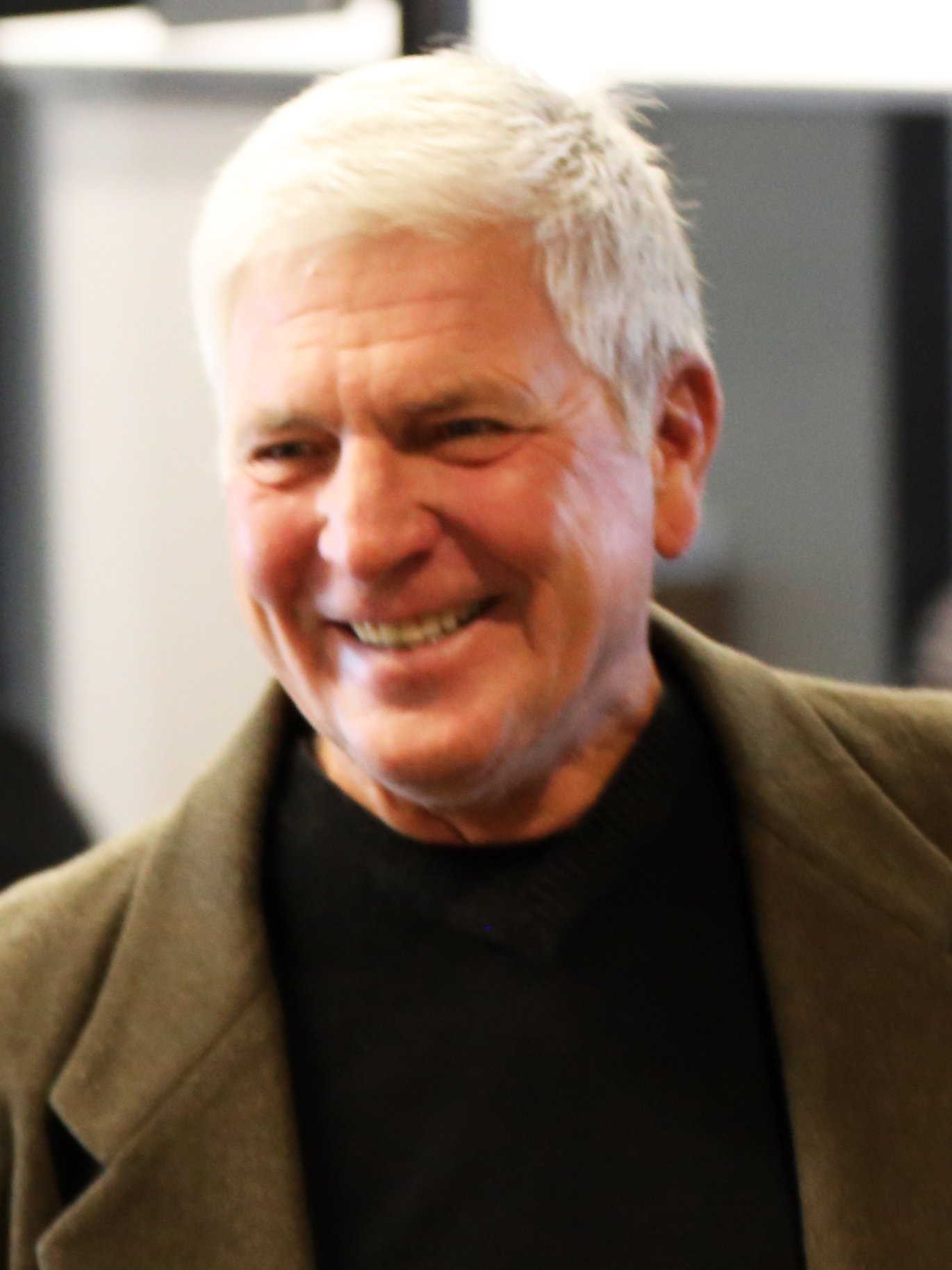

Member of the Washington State Senate from the 16th district
- Incumbent
- Assumed office January 11, 2021
- Preceded by: Maureen Walsh

Personal details
- Born: 1958 or 1959 (age 66–67) Washington, U.S.
- Party: Republican
- Spouse: Darleen Dozier
- Children: 2
- Education: Whitman College
- Occupation: Farmer, politician
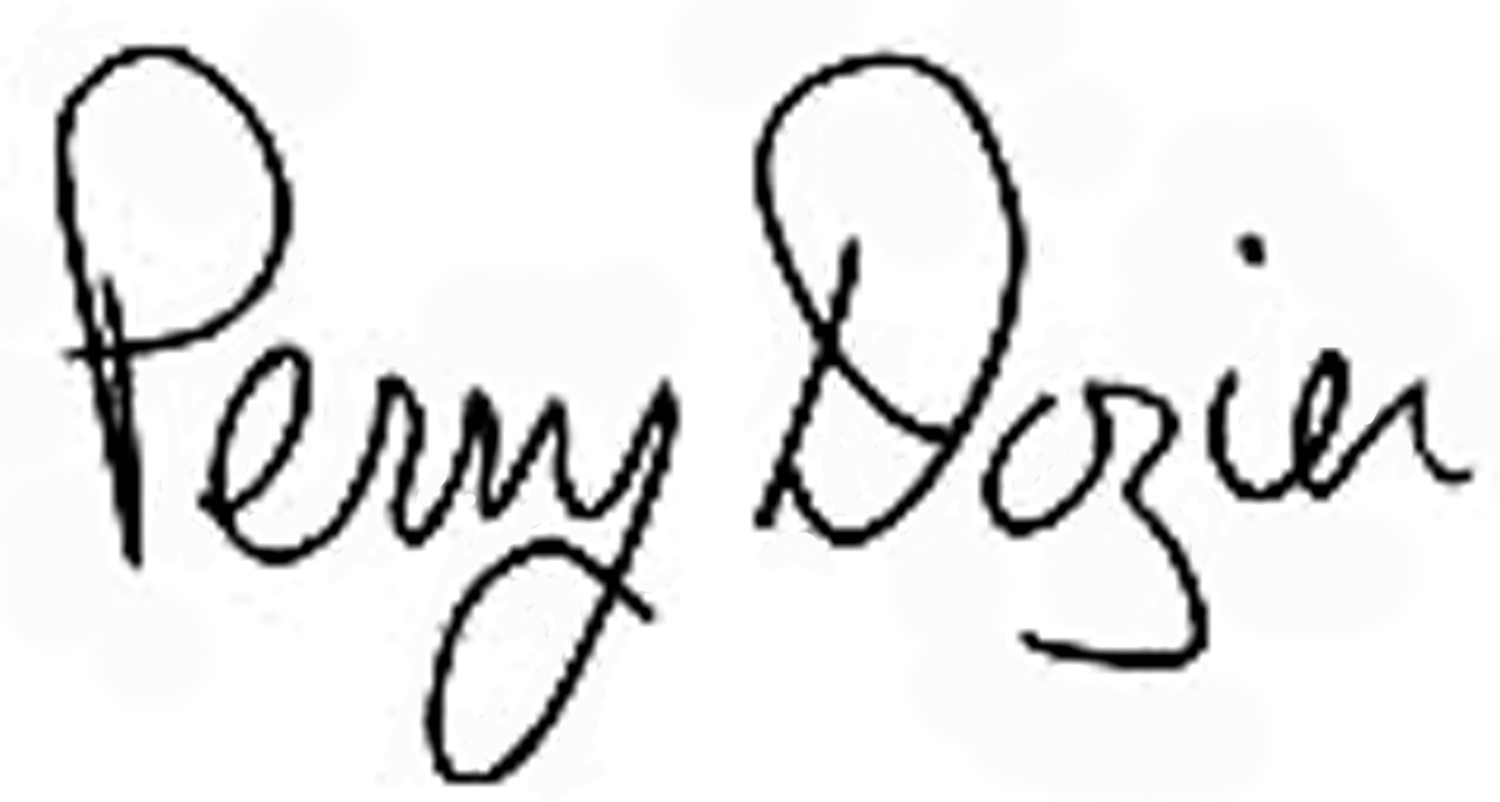
- Signature
- Website: perrydozier.src.wastateleg.org

Perry L. Dozier (born 1958 or 1959) is an American politician from Washington. He is a Republican member of the Washington State Senate from District 16.

== Career ==
Dozier and his father-in-law founded Double D Ranches after graduating from Whitman College. He became president of the Washington Wheat Growers Association in 2001. In 2008, he was elected to the Walla Walla County Commission, and served two four-year terms.

In 2020, Dozier was elected to the Washington State Senate.

== Personal life ==
Dozier's wife is Darleen Dozier. They have two children. Dozier and his family live in Walla Walla, Washington.
