= Adrian Cortes (politician) =

American politician

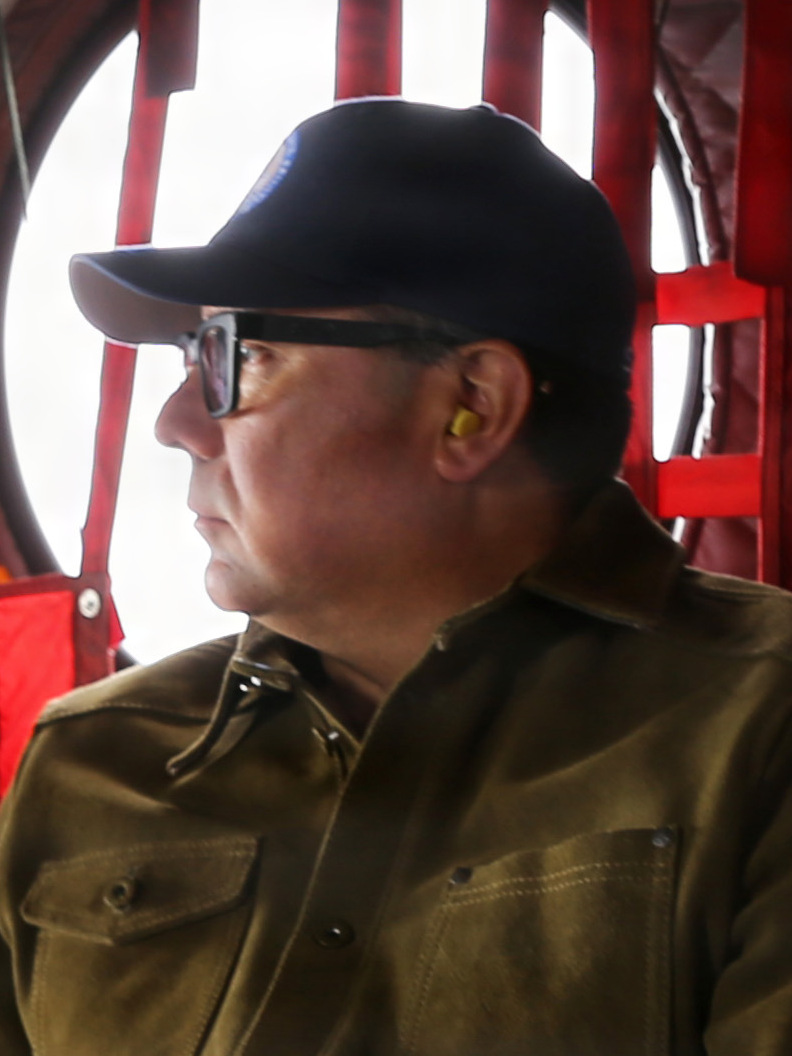

Member of the Washington State Senate from the 18th district
- Incumbent
- Assumed office January 13, 2025
- Preceded by: Ann Rivers

Personal details
- Party: Democratic

Adrian Cortes is an American politician, who is currently in the Washington State Senate from the 18th district. Having won by just 172 votes, Cortes' race was the only one of the 2024 Washington elections to legally require a recount.

Prior to serving in the Washington State Senate, Cortes was a city council member for Battle Ground, Washington and also served as the city's mayor from 2020-2021.
