= San Juan County Council =

Legislative body of San Juan County, Washington, US

- San Juan County, Washington

Type
- Type: County council

Structure
- Seats: 3
- Political groups: Officially nonpartisan Democratic Party (3)
- Length of term: 4 years

Elections
- Last election: November 5, 2024

Meeting place
- San Juan County Legislative Building; 55 Second Street; Friday Harbor, Washington 98250

Website
- San Juan County Council

The San Juan County Council is the legislative body of San Juan County, Washington, United States. As of 2013, the county council consists of three members, all elected at-large, though each candidates must live within a defined area. The council adopts laws, sets policy, and holds final approval over the budget.

== Members ==
District	Councilmember	Party	Term
1	Kari McVeigh	Democratic	January 2025 - December 2028
2	Justin Paulsen	Democratic	January 2025 - December 2028
3	Jane Fuller	Democratic	January 2023 - December 2026

== History ==
The county council was created in 2006 as part of a home rule charter, which replaced the traditional three-member county commission with a six-member council. The council was reduced to three members in January 2013. San Juan County was the sixth county in Washington to adopt a home rule charter.
