= Liz Lovelett =

American politician from Washington

Member of the Washington State Senate from the 40th district
- Incumbent
- Assumed office February 5, 2019
- Preceded by: Kevin Ranker

Personal details
- Born: 1980 (age 45–46) Seattle, Washington
- Party: Democratic
- Education: Skagit Valley College

Elizabeth P. Lovelett (born 1980) is an American politician of the Democratic Party. She is a member of the Washington State Senate, District 40.

Lovelett was a member of the city council of Anacortes, Washington, representing At-Large Position 6. She was first elected to city council in 2013, defeating incumbent Bill Turner, and was re-elected without opposition in 2017. On February 5, 2019, Lovelett was appointed to the Washington State Senate following the resignation of Kevin Ranker. She was married to Jensen C. Lovelett in 2002. Prior to entering politics, Lovelett and her husband operated the historical The Business record store in Anacortes.

In 2024, Lovelett killed a state legislative proposal to require all Washington cities to allow small businesses, such as cafes, in residential neighborhoods. The bill passed unanimously in the Washington House of Representatives, but was blocked by Lovelett in the Senate where she chairs the local government, land use, and tribal affairs committee.
