= Keith Goehner =

American farmer, educator and politician from Washington

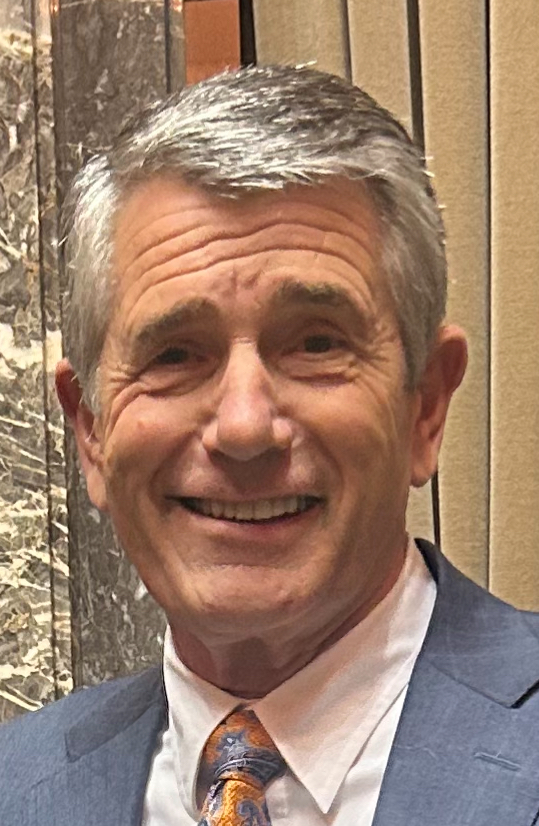
- Goehner in 2025

Member of the Washington State Senate from the 12th district
- Incumbent
- Assumed office January 13, 2025
- Preceded by: Brad Hawkins

Member of the Washington House of Representatives from the 12th district
- In office January 14, 2019 – January 13, 2025
- Preceded by: Cary Condotta
- Succeeded by: Brian Burnett

Personal details
- Born: 1952 (age 73–74) Leavenworth, Washington, U.S.
- Party: Republican
- Spouse: Lisa Goehner
- Children: 3
- Education: Seattle Pacific University
- Occupation: Farmer, Educator, politician
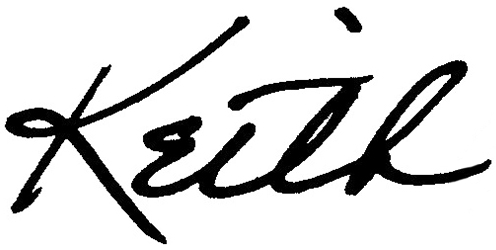
- Signature

Keith W. Goehner (born 1952) is an American farmer, former educator, and politician from Washington. Goehner is a Republican member of the Washington State Senate.

== Education ==
Goehner attended Wenatachee Valley College. Goehner earned a Bachelor of Arts degree in Education from Seattle Pacific University.

== Career ==
Goehner is a former elementary school teacher.

As a fruit farmer, Goehner is a pear grower in the Dryden area in Washington. Goehner is a third-generation orchardist. Goehner is the President of K&L Orchards Inc.

From 2003 to 2019, Goehner served as the County Commissioner for Chelan County. Goehner served 4 terms.

Goehner was elected to the state legislature in 2018, running against independent candidate Ann Diamond.

Goehner represents the 12th Legislative District, which includes Chelan, Douglas, Okanogan, and Grant counties.

== Awards ==
- 2020 Guardians of Small Business. Presented by NFIB.

== Personal life ==
Goehner's wife is Lisa Goehner. They have three children. Goehner and his family live in Dryden, Washington.
