= Hans Zeiger =

American politician in Washington state (born 1985)

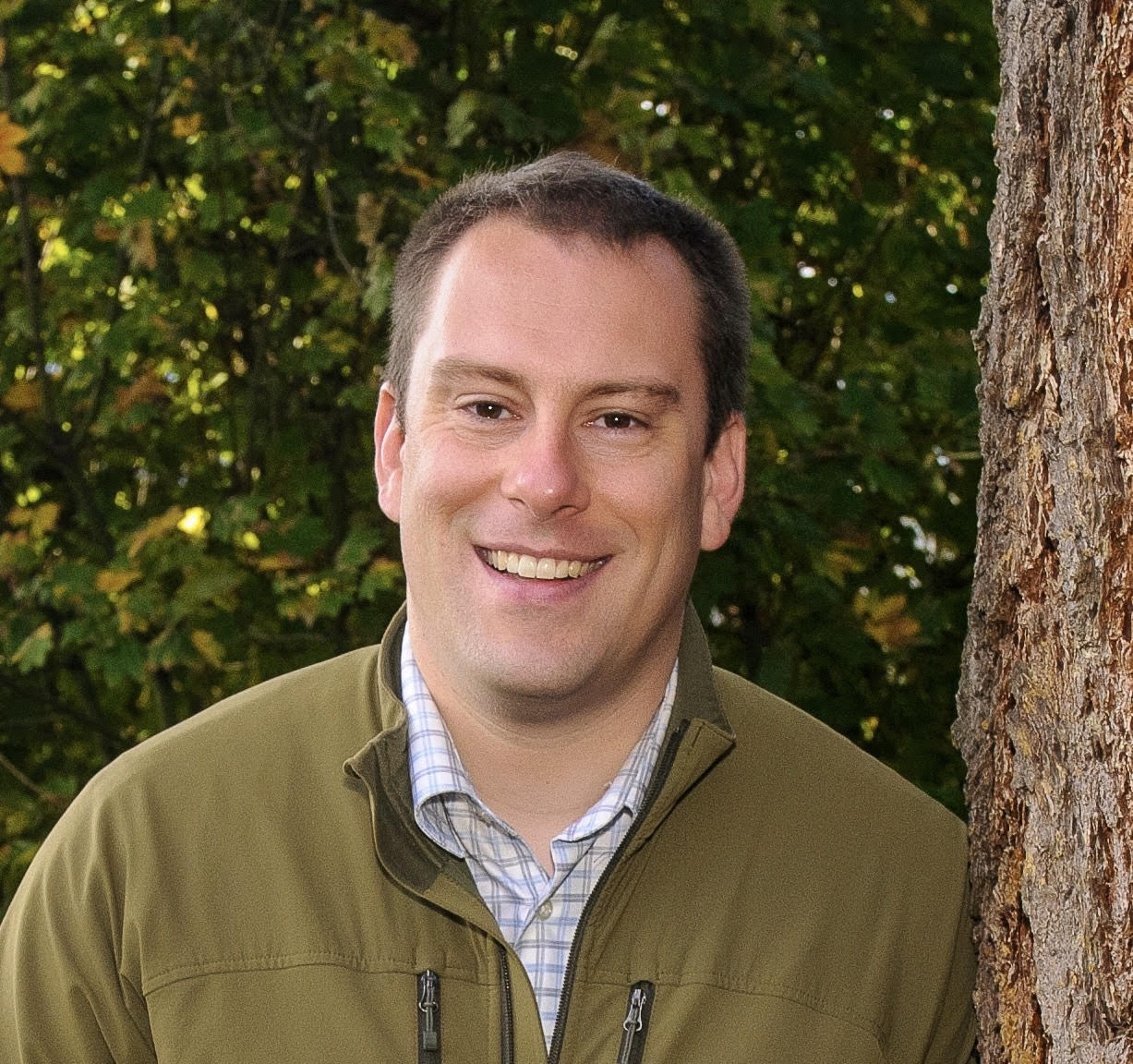

Member of the Pierce County Council from the 2nd District
- In office January 13, 2021 – July 31, 2022
- Preceded by: Pam Roach
- Succeeded by: Paul Herrera

Member of the Washington Senate from the 25th district
- In office January 3, 2017 – January 11, 2021
- Preceded by: Bruce Dammeier
- Succeeded by: Chris Gildon

Member of the Washington House of Representatives from the 25th district
- In office January 10, 2011 – January 3, 2017
- Preceded by: Dawn Morrell
- Succeeded by: Joyce McDonald

Personal details
- Born: Hans Andreas Zeiger; February 20, 1985 (age 41) Tacoma, Washington, U.S.
- Party: Republican
- Spouse: Erin
- Children: 2
- Education: Hillsdale College (BA); Pepperdine University (MPP)
- Website: Official

Military service
- Branch/service: United States Air Force
- Unit: Air National Guard; Washington Air National Guard

Hans Andreas Zeiger (born February 20, 1985) is president of the Jack Miller Center, a US nonprofit network of academic scholars focused on civic education. He served as a member of the Pierce County Council from 2021 to 2022. A member of the Republican Party, he served as a member of the Washington State Senate, representing the 25th district from 2017 to 2021 and as a member of the Washington House of Representatives from 2011 to 2017. Zeiger is an author and editor and served in the Air National Guard.

== Early life and education ==
A native of Puyallup, Washington, Zeiger attended Puyallup High School, graduating in 2003. There he was involved in student government, cross country, and debate. He achieved the rank of Eagle Scout from Troop 174 in Puyallup.

Zeiger earned a Bachelor of Arts degree in American studies from Hillsdale College and a Master of Public Policy from the Pepperdine University School of Public Policy. He began doctoral studies in political science at Claremont Graduate University but withdrew during his first campaign for the state legislature.

== Career ==
Zeiger is an author and editor whose works include "Puyallup in World War II," published in 2018 by History Press. As a college student, he authored two books published by B&H Publishing Group; Get Off My Honor: The Assault on the Boy Scouts of America in 2005, and Reagan's Children: Taking Back the City on the Hill in 2006.

In 2013, he was commissioned as an officer in the Washington Air National Guard.

=== Washington Legislature ===
In 2010, Zeiger was first elected as to the Washington House of Representatives in 2010. He served on the Transportation, Higher Education, and Capital Budget Committees, and he was appointed to the Joint Legislative Audit and Review Committee.

In 2015, Zeiger announced his candidacy for the Washington State Senate in 2016 and was elected in November 2016. He was sworn in six days early, on January 3, 2017, after his predecessor resigned. In the Senate, Zeiger served as the Republican lead on Housing Stability and Affordability Committee and the State Government, Tribal Relations and Elections Committee. He also served as a member of the Human Services, Re-entry and Rehabilitation Committee and the Transportation Committee.

=== Civic involvement ===
In 2007, Zeiger began a project to document the stories of Puyallup's World War II veterans.

His civic and volunteer activities have included the boards of the Washington State Historical Society, the South Hill Historical Society, the William D. Ruckelshaus Center, Mainstream Republicans of Washington, and the Pierce County Developmental Disabilities Advisory Board.

In 2015, Zeiger was awarded the Gabrielle Giffords Award for Civility in State Government at the meeting of the National Conference of State Legislators.
