= Mark Schoesler =

American politician

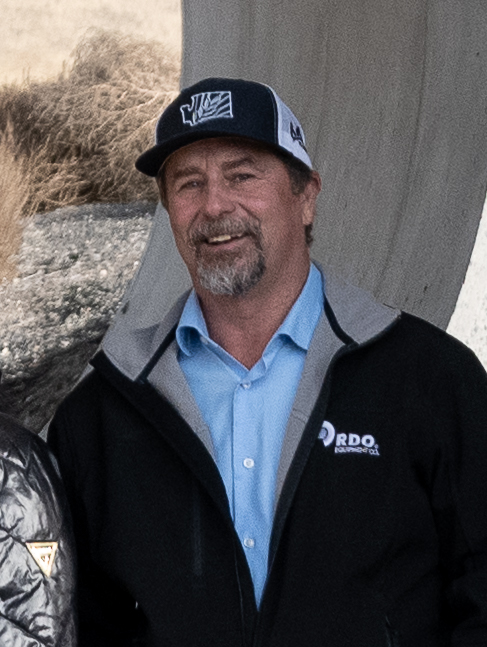
- Schoesler in 2022

Minority Leader of the Washington State Senate
- In office November 15, 2017 – November 30, 2020
- Preceded by: Sharon Nelson
- Succeeded by: John Braun

Majority Leader of the Washington State Senate
- In office December 1, 2014 – November 15, 2017
- Preceded by: Rodney Tom
- Succeeded by: Sharon Nelson

Member of the Washington State Senate from the 9th district
- Incumbent
- Assumed office January 10, 2005
- Preceded by: Larry Sheahan

Member of the Washington House of Representatives from the 9th district
- In office 1993–2005

Personal details
- Born: February 16, 1957 (age 69) Ritzville, Washington
- Party: Republican
- Education: Spokane Community College (AA)
- Website: Official website

Mark G. Schoesler (born February 16, 1957) is an American politician who is a Republican. He is a member of the Washington State Senate. He has represented District 9 since 2005.

Washington State Senate
Preceded by Rodney Tom	Majority Leader of the Washington Senate; 2014-2017	Succeeded by Sharon Nelson
Washington State Senate
Preceded by Sharon Nelson	Minority Leader of the Washington Senate; 2017–2020	Succeeded by John Braun
