= John Braun =

American politician from Washington

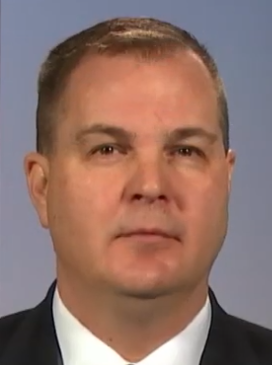
- Braun in 2020

Minority Leader of the Washington State Senate
- Incumbent
- Assumed office November 30, 2020
- Preceded by: Mark Schoesler

Member of the Washington Senate from the 20th district
- Incumbent
- Assumed office July 23, 2017
- Preceded by: Marlo Braun
- In office January 14, 2013 – July 18, 2017
- Preceded by: Dan Swecker
- Succeeded by: Marlo Braun

Personal details
- Born: John Eric Braun; January 16, 1967 (age 59) Columbus, Ohio, U.S.
- Party: Republican
- Spouse: Marlo Braun
- Children: 4
- Education: University of Washington (BS); University of Michigan (MS, MBA)
- Website: State Senate website

John Eric Braun (born January 16, 1967) is an American politician and former Navy captain from Washington. A Republican, Braun is in the Washington State Senate, representing the 20th legislative district. He serves as the Minority Leader of the Washington State Senate.

== Early life, education, and military service ==
John Braun was born on January 16, 1967, in Columbus, Ohio. He grew up in Ohio and attended the University of Washington on a U.S. Naval ROTC scholarship. He graduated in 1989 with a Bachelor's degree in electrical engineering. He then served seven years on active duty with the United States Navy.

Following active service with the Navy, Braun earned his Master of Business Administration degree and Master of Science in manufacturing engineering from the University of Michigan in 1999.

== Business career ==
Braun serves as president of Braun Northwest, a family-owned emergency vehicle manufacturer founded in 1986, which serves emergency response agencies across the western United States.

== Political career ==
In 2012, Braun ran in a three-way all-Republican primary versus the incumbent state senator Dan Swecker and employment specialist and former substitute teacher Rae Lowery. In the primary, Braun received 40.33 percent of the vote to Swecker's 46.97 percent, and went on to defeat Swecker in the general election with 55.43 percent of the vote.

Braun is considered a moderate or conservative Republican, and is affiliated with the Mainstream Republicans of Washington.

=== Legislative leadership and committees ===
Braun was a member of the Senate Ways and Means Committee.

In November 2020, Braun was elected Washington Senate Minority Leader by members of the Republican caucus. Braun has served as the minority leader since the start of the 2021–2022 legislative session. His appointment of former state Senator Joe Fain to the Washington State Redistricting Commission in 2021 attracted controversy due to allegations of sexual assault against the latter.

Lieutenant Governor Denny Heck credited Bruan and Senate Majority Leader Andy Billig with helping to engender a "culture of collaboration" between Democrats and Republicans in the State Senate. He maintains a close friendship with Heck and Billig.

As Minority Leader, Braun supported a primary challenge to right-wing Senator Jim McCune in 2024.

=== 2026 U.S. House campaign ===
In August 2025, Braun announced that he would be running for U.S. House in Washington's 3rd congressional district in 2026.

== Personal life ==
Braun lives on a small farm in rural Centralia with his wife and four children. He is the president of Braun Northwest, a Chehalis-based company that manufactures emergency vehicles that is owned by the family. The company has 300 employees and has been the site of several workplace safety incidents, including the accidental death of an employee in 2024. Braun Northwest was also fined by the Washington State Department of Labor and Industries in 2025 for violations of child labor laws concerning hazardous equipment.

== Awards ==
- 2014 Guardians of Small Business award. Presented by NFIB.

Washington State Senate
Preceded by Mark Schoesler	Minority Leader of the Washington Senate; 2020–present	Incumbent
