= Barbara Bailey (politician) =

American politician from Washington

Member of the Washington Senate from the 10th district
- In office January 14, 2013 – September 30, 2019
- Preceded by: Mary Margaret Haugen
- Succeeded by: Ron Muzzall

Member of the Washington House of Representatives from the 10th district
- In office January 13, 2003 – January 14, 2013
- Preceded by: Kelly Barlean
- Succeeded by: Dave Hayes

Personal details
- Born: Barbara Floyd Bailey; 1944 (age 81–82) Missouri
- Party: Republican
- Spouse: Butch
- Education: University of the State of New York
- Occupation: Politician
- Website: Official

Barbara Floyd Bailey (born 1944) is an American politician of the Republican Party. She was a member of the Washington Senate, representing the 10th district, from 2013 to 2019. She previously represented the 10th district in the Washington House of Representatives.

== Political career ==
Bailey was first elected to the Washington State House of Representatives in 2002, defeating Democrat Eron Berg and Libertarian Brett Wilhelm. She represented district 10 from 2003 to 2013.

In 2012, Bailey ran for State Senate in the 10th district, defeating the incumbent, Senator Mary Margaret Haugen with 52.8%.

Bailey served on the following committees:

- Health & Long Term Care
- Ways & Means
- State Government, Tribal Relations & Elections
- Veterans and Military Affairs Joint Committee.

== Background ==
Bailey holds a B.S. degree in psychology from the State University of New York. She also is a certified marketing executive and certified hotel administrator.

Prior to her work in the legislature, Bailey served as a member on the Oak Harbor Comprehensive Planning Task Force, Island County 2 Percent Lodging Tax Advisory Committee, and the Island County Joint Committee on Tourism.

Bailey lives in Oak Harbor with her husband, Butch Bailey (Capt., USN, Ret.), who taught Navy JROTC in the Burlington-Edison School System. They have four grown children and nine grandchildren.

== Awards ==
- 2014 Guardians of Small Business award. Presented by NFIB.
