= 2024 Washington elections =

2024 Washington Statewide Executive Offices elections
- November 5, 2024

All statewide executive offices
	Majority party	Minority party
Party	Democratic	Republican
Last election	8	1
Seats before	9 (Note: Washington Secretary of State Kim Wyman, a Republican, resigned from the office on November 19, 2021, to become the senior election security lead for the Cybersecurity and Infrastructure Security Agency in the Biden administration's Department of Homeland Security. Washington governor Jay Inslee – a Democrat – appointed Democratic state senator Steve Hobbs to replace her.)	0
Seats won	9	0
Seat change	Steady	Steady
Percentage	55.96%	43.86%
Swing	▼2.27%	▲4.58%

Washington state elections in 2024 were held on November 5, 2024. Primary elections were held on August 6, 2024.

This was the first time since 1965 that Republicans have not held at least one executive office going into the election.

In the early hours of October 28, a ballot drop box in Vancouver was found to be on fire damaging a number of ballots. Police stated that a suspicious device had been found next to the box.

== Federal ==
=== President of the United States ===
Washington has 12 electoral votes for the presidential election, remaining unchanged from 2020. A presidential primary for both parties was held on March 12, 2024.

=== United States Senate ===
Washington's Class 1 U.S. Senate seat was up for election in 2024. Incumbent four-term Democratic Senator Maria Cantwell ran for re-election.

=== United States House of Representatives ===
All of Washington's seats in the United States House of Representatives were up for re-election. Incumbent Representatives Derek Kilmer (D) from the 6th district and Cathy McMorris Rodgers (R) from the 5th district announced they would not seek re-election.

== Statewide executive ==
=== Governor ===
Incumbent three-term governor Jay Inslee (D) announced he would not seek re-election. Democratic attorney general Bob Ferguson won the election over Republican former congressman Dave Reichert.

=== Lieutenant governor ===
Incumbent one-term lieutenant governor Denny Heck (D) won re-election to a second term over Republican candidate Dan Matthews.

=== Attorney general ===
Incumbent three-term attorney general Bob Ferguson (D) announced he would not seek re-election and instead ran for governor. Democratic former U.S. attorney Nick Brown won the election, defeating Republican mayor of Pasco Pete Serrano.

=== Secretary of state ===
Incumbent secretary of state Steve Hobbs (D) was named to replace former secretary of state Kim Wyman (R) who was re-elected to a third term in 2020, but resigned in 2021 to take a position in the Biden administration. Hobbs won a 2022 special election to fill the role, and announced that he would seek re-election to a first full term. Hobbs won the election the election decisively against Republican Dale Whitaker.

=== Public Lands Commissioner ===
Incumbent two-term Public Lands Commissioner Hilary Franz (D) announced that she would not seek re-election and instead ran for the House of Representatives in Washington's 6th congressional district. Democratic King County councilor Dave Upthegrove defeated Republican former congresswoman Jaime Herrera Beutler.

=== State auditor ===
Incumbent two-term state auditor Pat McCarthy (D) filed to run for re-election to a third term, despite there being speculation that she would retire. McCarthy won re-election against Republican Matt Hawkins.

=== State treasurer ===
Incumbent one-term state treasurer Mike Pellicciotti (D) was the only Democrat to defeat a statewide Republican officeholder in Washington in 2020, defeating State Treasurer Duane Davidson (R). Pellicciotti won re-election to a second term against Republican Sharon Hanek.

=== Superintendent of Public Instruction ===
Incumbent two-term state superintendent Chris Reykdal (non-partisan) won re-election to a third term, defeating Peninsula School District board President David Olson.

=== Insurance Commissioner ===
Incumbent six-term insurance commissioner Mike Kreidler (D) announced he will retire at the end of his term. Democratic state senator Patty Kuderer won the election against Republican state senator Phil Fortunato.

== Supreme Court ==
Seats 2, 8, and 9 of the Washington Supreme Court were up for six-year terms. Chief Justice Steven González, and Justice Sheryl Gordon McCloud were up for re-election and were re-elected unopposed. In 2024, Susan Owens reached mandatory retirement and was not eligible to seek re-election.

== Legislative ==
=== State senate ===
Twenty-four of the forty-nine seats in the Washington State Senate were up for election. Democrats won a 30–19 majority in the Senate, a net gain of one seat compared with 2022.

=== State House of Representatives ===
All 98 seats in the Washington House of Representatives were up for election. Democrats won a 59–39 majority in the House, a net gain of one seat compared with 2022.

== See also ==
- Elections in Washington (state)
- 2022 Washington Secretary of State special election

== Notes ==
Partisan clients
