= Ann Rivers =

American politician and educator from Washington

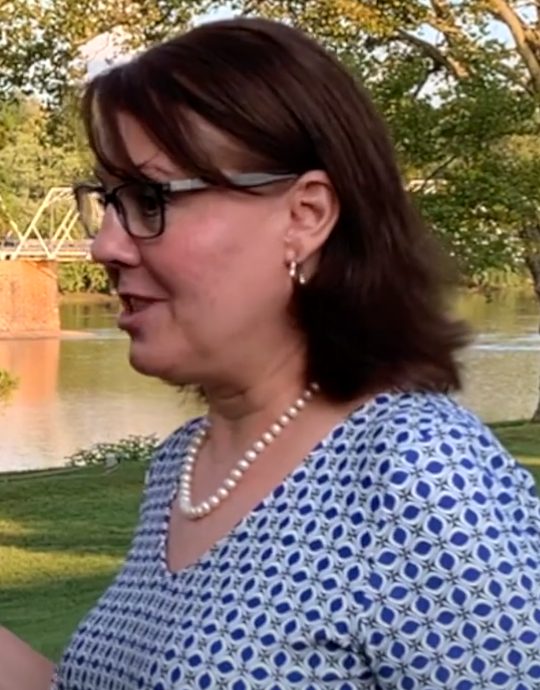

Member of the Washington Senate from the 18th district
- In office June 25, 2012 – January 13, 2025
- Preceded by: Joseph Zarelli
- Succeeded by: Adrian Cortes

Member of the Washington House of Representatives from the 18th district
- In office January 5, 2011 – June 25, 2012
- Preceded by: Jaime Herrera Beutler
- Succeeded by: Liz Pike

Personal details
- Born: 1965 or 1966 (age 59–60) St. Joseph, Michigan, U.S.
- Party: Republican
- Spouse: Fred Rivers
- Children: 2
- Education: Central Michigan University
- Website: Official

Anna M. Rivers (born 1965 or 1966) is an American politician and educator who served as a Republican member of the Washington State Senate from when she was appointed to represent the 18th district in 2012, upon the resignation of Joe Zarelli. Prior to this she was a member of the Washington House of Representatives. In her first full term, a Majority Coalition Caucus was formed, taking control away from the Democrats in the state senate. Rivers was appointed to be majority whip for the session, a rare appointment for a freshman senator. She won re-election for another four-year term in 2012, with 67% of the vote against 32% for her opponent, Ralph Schmidt.

Prior to her holding elected office, Rivers led AMR Consulting, a political consulting firm which aided candidates in their elections for offices, as well as providing political consultation to corporate clients. In 2007, she was on the short list for candidates to be chosen to replace Richard Curtis in the state house, but Jaime Herrera Beutler was chosen instead. Later, Rivers succeeded Herrera Beutler in the house after the latter's election to the United States Congress.

== Early life and career ==
Rivers was born in 1968 in Saint Joseph, Michigan. She earned a bachelor's degree in political science from Central Michigan University. After graduating in 1990, Rivers worked as a 6th grade teacher. In 2002, she returned to school and graduated from Lewis and Clark College with a secondary teaching certificate.

Though she didn't run for office herself until much later, she helped Bill Williams in his election to the Alaska legislature in 1992, and became his chief of staff. During that election, she founded AMR Consulting, a public relations and government affairs consulting firm, which helped in many political campaigns and provided political consultation for corporations. When Representative Richard Curtis resigned from state house in 2007, Rivers was considered by the Clark County and Lewis County commissions to be a replacement but Jaime Herrera Beutler was chosen instead.

== State House of Representatives ==
Rivers was elected to the Washington House of Representatives in 2010 succeeding Herrera Beutler after Beutler's election to the United States Congress. As a state representative, Rivers was the assistant whip for the House Republican Caucus. She also served on the House's Business and Financial Services Committee, Judiciary Committee, Transportation Committee and Rules Committee. Her website listed communication as being vital as a state representative.

In January 2011, Rivers was selected to deliver the Republican response to governor Christine Gregoire's State of the State address. In the address, she listed economic recovery and employment as well as compromise with Gregoire as being the top priorities of her party.

In February, Rivers submitted a bill to provide more funding for food banks and other charitable causes. The bill authorized public utilities to solicit and collect donations from customers to be put towards food programs for the poor. It also made the donations received by utilities separate from gross income, allowing for it to be tax-free. The bill passed in the State House in February 2011 but failed to make it to the Senate floor.

== State Senate ==
=== Appointment and elections ===
In June 2012, about 18 months into her term as a representative, county commissioners appointed Rivers to the state senate to replace Joseph Zarelli, who resigned after 17 years in the senate. Rivers won re-election in the 2012 election to a four-year term, with 67% of the vote, to 32% for her opponent, Ralph Schmidt. She outraised by 30–1, with $150,000, to just $5,000 for Schmidt. Rivers' ideas for improving the economy include making the climate friendlier for business. Her plan includes reducing the burden of worker's compensation costs for businesses, reducing regulations, and reducing permitting fees. Rivers was reelected again in 2016, receiving 63.81% of the vote to Democrat Eric Holt's 36.19%. In 2020, she was reelected with 56.3% of the vote against Democrat Rick Bell.

=== Tenure ===
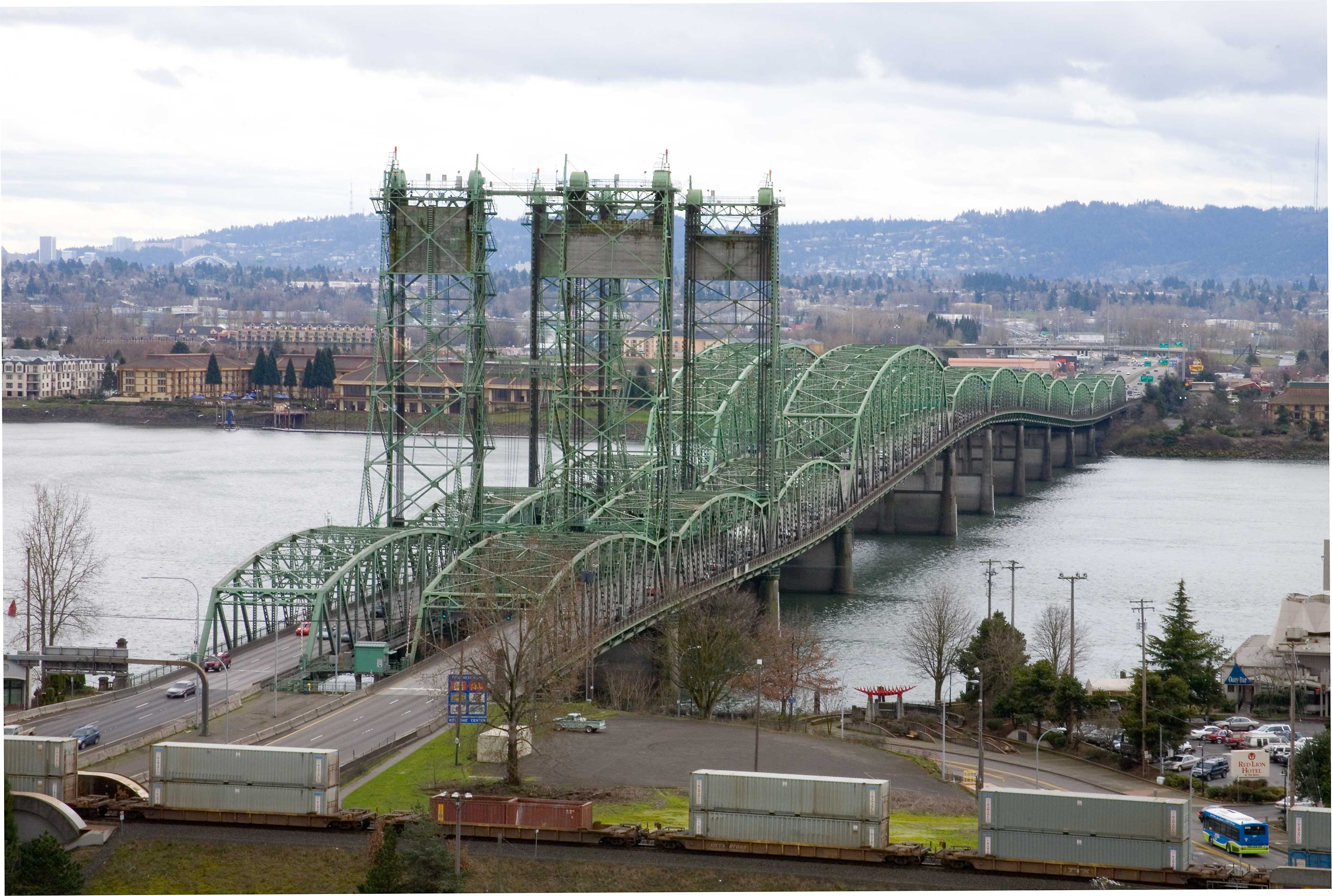
Rivers has strongly spoken against the implementation of plans to replace the Interstate Bridge.

Rivers has spoken strongly about the Columbia River Crossing I-5 bridge replacement, saying that she disagreed with most everything about the current plan, and that it does not do enough to solve the problem. Willamette Week of Portland labeled Rivers "The CRC killer" for her leadership role in the opposition to the proposed megaproject. Due to their opposition to the project, in July 2013, Governor Jay Inslee labeled both Rivers and Senator Don Benton from the neighboring 17th district "a brick wall to economic progress and CRC." Speaking to a group of CRC supports, "The road to this bridge runs through two senators from this region. Those two senators have stymied any progress on this bridge project. … Until that changes, there’s not a lot I or you can do about that."

In early 2012, Rivers was selected for the Council of State Governments for the Western Legislative Academy. Out of 93 applicants, 39, including Rivers, were chosen. The academy is a training institute for lawmakers in their first four years of service.

In November 2012, shortly after entering office, Rivers was appointed to the Republican leadership as the minority whip. When the Majority Coalition Caucus was formed, taking control of the Senate away from the Democrats, Rivers was promoted to majority whip. It is rare for a freshman senator to be appointed to party leadership.

Rivers introduced a bill in February 2013 to exempt nonprofit shooting clubs from paying sales and use taxes when they buy clay pigeons. The bill is cosponsored by Senators Don Benton and Pam Roach. Earlier in February, Rivers also introduced legislation attempting to lower restrictions on initiatives in Washington State, commenting, "If the people take the time to sign their name and say this is something we need to have a look at, we ought to respect that." Along with cosponsors Roach and Benton, Tim Eyman also is cosponsoring the legislation. In March 2013, Rivers reprimanded senate Democrats for taking advantage of Janéa Holmquist Newbry's departure from the senate floor to feed her newborn son, leaving the Democrats in temporary control of the senate floor. Immediately after she left, Democrat David Frockt attempted to pass a bill through the floor. As part of her duties, Rivers has also hosted high-school aged pages for the Washington State Senate Page Program.

Rivers introduced legislation to increase taxes on medical marijuana. Washington is one of only a few states that has legalized marijuana for both medical and recreational use. Recreational marijuana has a 25% tax for consumers. However, medical marijuana does not have any taxes. Rivers' legislation would also force medical marijuana clinics to obtain more permits and waivers.

In June 2013, fellow state senator Don Benton filed a complaint against Rivers, claiming she had broken a senate floor rule by swearing at him during a floor discussion. Benton also claimed that Rivers had screamed at him on one other occasion, during a Republican caucus. He claimed that he had felt physically threatened, saying, "It was a very uncomfortable feeling. I have been on the receiving end of many heated comments over the years, but I have never before felt the threat of physical violence." Rivers responded with an apology; he took issue with some of the wording in the apology and he filed the complaint. Many have come out in support of Rivers, who claims that Benton was harassing her, adding she will, "stand my ground against anyone who attempts to bully, intimidate or threaten me." Some have labeled Benton a hypocrite, as he recently lifted sanctions against Pam Roach, who had been seen screaming on the floor and had mistreated staff. In a January 2014 decision, officials in the Washington State Legislature have decided both senators were at fault for the spat. They determined that Benton had harassed Rivers, which provoked her. On the decision, Rivers stated, "I have to conclude that he was trying to bait me into this reaction, which unfortunately he did.”

At the end of June 2014, Rivers joined lawmakers including Lieutenant Governor Brad Owen on a state trade mission to Taiwan. Rivers' district sells more fishing licenses than any other in the state and she would like “to promote our area as a destination for sport fishing.”

On March 24, 2021, Rivers attended the Senate Health and Long Term Care Committee meeting, during which she used the word "retarded" when she stated, "There’s no way (it) doesn’t get funded this year. We would have to be retarded. Or idiots. Or something if we didn't fund that." In a text message to Oregon Public Broadcasting, Rivers stated she regretted the remark.

=== Clark County Politics ===
==== Freeholder ====
In 2013, Rivers ran for a freeholder position in Clark County's 1st district. The freeholders are responsible for drafting a new county charter that will, with voter's approval, turn Clark County into a Charter County. 123 people filed for the 15 freeholder seats. The primary election, held August 5, was noted for its low turnout (under 20%), although Rivers garnered enough votes to move on to the general election. In the November 6 election, she was elected with 46% of the vote in a 5 candidate field and took office on November 26.

The Board of Freeholders submitted a home rule charter on May 27 which put it on the ballot in the November election. In the November election, the charter was approved with 53% of the vote.

==== Candidacy for Clark County Chair ====
In late 2014 and early 2015, Rivers briefly considered running to be the chair of Clark County, a new position created with the home rule charter that Rivers worked to pass. There is no official rule against serving both as the chair and a state senator, but there were concerns about Rivers' ability to balance the two offices. In December 2014, Rivers officially announced she would run for the office. On March 2, 2015, The Columbian reported Rivers would likely be withdrawing from the race later that week. That was confirmed when Rivers released a statement later that day that said Rivers would not be a candidate. Rivers cited the time commitment and desire to stay in the State Senate as reasons for her withdrawal. She was considered the front runner for the office.

== Personal life ==
Rivers' husband is Fred Rivers, a senior account manager for NALCO. They have two children. Rivers and her family live in La Center, Washington.

== Awards ==
- 2014 Guardians of Small Business award. Presented by NFIB.
- 2020 Guardians of Small Business. Presented by NFIB.
