= Kevin Ranker =

American politician

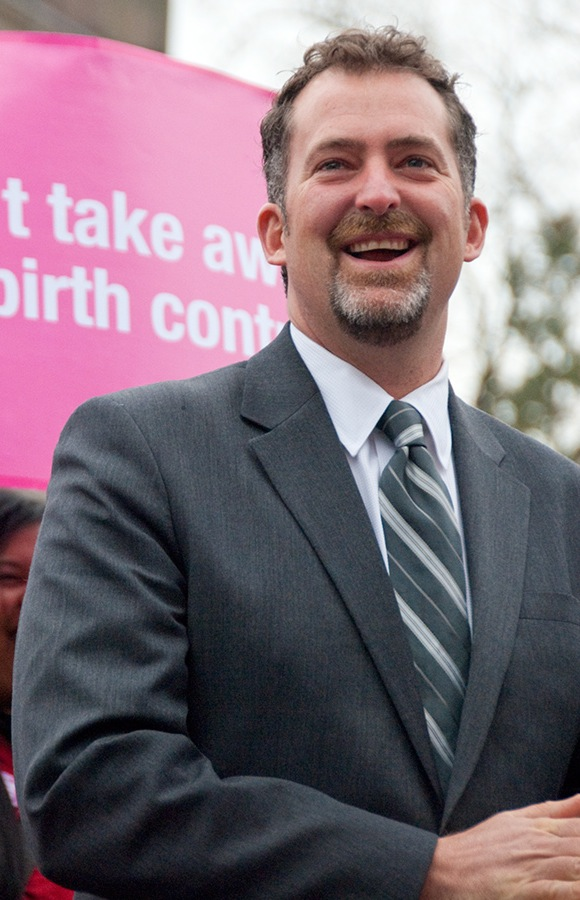
- Ranker in 2011

Member of the Washington Senate from the 40th district
- In office January 12, 2009 – January 9, 2019
- Preceded by: Harriet Spanel
- Succeeded by: Liz Lovelett

Member of the San Juan County Council from the 2nd district
- In office January 1, 2006 – January 12, 2009
- Preceded by: Constituency established
- Succeeded by: Rich Peterson

Personal details
- Born: 1970 (age 55–56) England, United Kingdom
- Party: Democratic
- Education: Evergreen State College (BS); University of Idaho
- Website: kevinranker.org

Kevin M. M. Ranker (born 1970) is an American politician who is a member of the Democratic Party. He represented the 40th District from 2009 to 2019 in the Washington State Senate.

Prior to his election to the Senate, Ranker served as a member of the San Juan County Council. In 2011, he was appointed as an Advisor to President Obama's National Ocean Council. He is also the 2013-2014 President of Pacific Northwest Economic Region, a partnership of ten U.S. states and Canadian provinces.

Ranker was first elected in 2008, winning 58.6% of the vote against Republican Steve Van Luven. He was re-elected in 2012 with 62.9% of the vote, defeating Republican John Swapp.

Ranker resigned from the Senate on 9 January 2019, following sexual harassment and hostile workplace accusations.

Ranker lives on Orcas Island with his wife and daughter; his son serves in the U.S. Navy.
