= Annette Cleveland =

American politician from Washington

Member of the Washington Senate from the 49th district
- Incumbent
- Assumed office January 14, 2013
- Preceded by: Craig Pridemore

Personal details
- Born: Annette M. Forbes; 1962 (age 63–64) Vancouver, Washington, U.S.
- Party: Democratic
- Education: Clark College (AA); Marylhurst University
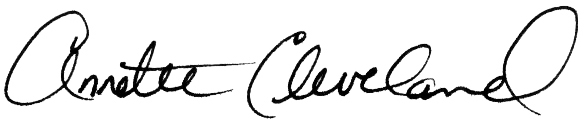
- Signature
- Website: www.annettecleveland.com Campaign

Annette M. Cleveland (née Forbes, born 1962) is an American politician of the Democratic Party. She is a member of the Washington State Senate from the 49th legislative district. She was first elected to that office in November 2012 for a term beginning in January 2013. She was elected with nearly 60% of the vote, against Republican Eileen Qutub.
