= Curtis King (politician) =

American politician (born 1946)

Curtis P. King
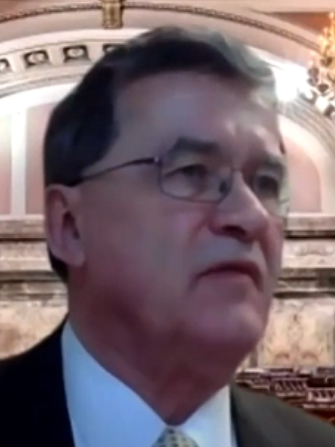

Member of the Washington State Senate from the 14th district
- Incumbent
- Assumed office November 29, 2007
- Preceded by: James Clements

Personal details
- Born: Curtis Paul King; 1946 (age 79–80) Yakima, Washington, U.S.
- Party: Republican
- Education: University of Washington (BS); Clemson University (MBA); Furman University (MBA)
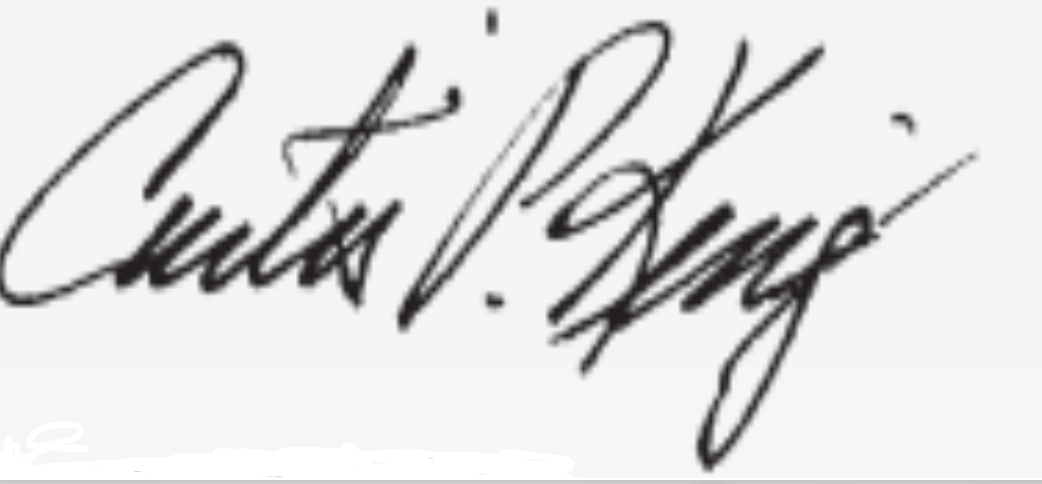
- Signature
- Website: Official

Curtis Paul King (born 1946) is an American businessman and politician of the Republican Party. He is a member of the Washington State Senate. He has represented District 14 since 2007.

He holds B.S. degrees in Physics and Mathematics from the University of Washington. While working for General Electric, he received his M.B.A. from Clemson-Furman Universities.

== Awards ==
- 2014 Guardians of Small Business award. Presented by NFIB.
- 2021 Legislator of the Year award. Presented by Washington Farm Bureau.
