= Washington's 12th legislative district =

American legislative district

Coordinates: 48°N 120°W

Washington's 12th legislative district map

Washington's 12th legislative district is one of forty-nine districts in Washington state for representation in the state legislature.

The rural district in north central Washington contains all of Chelan County and parts of King and Snohomish counties in Western Washington. It was redrawn again in 2024 following a U.S. District Court judge's order to amend 15th district in Yakima County; the 12th district was expanded across the Cascades and lost Wenatchee and East Wenatchee to the 7th district.

As of 2025, the district's legislators are state senator Keith Goehner and state representatives Brian Burnett (position 1) and Mike Steele (position 2), all Republicans. The 2024 redistricting has made the 12th district more competitive for both parties, especially for the Democratic Party, which did not field candidates in some past elections.

== See also ==
- Washington Redistricting Commission
- Washington State Legislature
- Washington State Senate
- Washington House of Representatives
