= 2008 Washington House of Representatives election =

Washington State House elections, 2008
- November 4, 2008

98 seats of the Washington State House of Representatives 50 seats needed for a majority
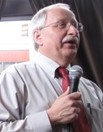

	Majority party	Minority party
Leader	Frank Chopp	Richard DeBolt
Party	Democratic	Republican
Leader's seat	43rd-Seattle	20th-Centralia
Last election	62	36
Seats before	63	35
Seats won	62	36
Seat change	▼1	▲1
Popular vote	3,098,374	2,157,540
Percentage	58.3%	40.6%
Swing	▲2.6%	▼3.6%
- Results: Democratic gain Republican gain Democratic hold Republican hold
House Speaker before election
Frank Chopp
Democratic
Elected House Speaker
Frank Chopp
Democratic

The 2008 Washington State House elections took place on November 4, 2008. Voters in all 49 of Washington's legislative districts voted for their representatives. Washington State Senate elections were also held on November 4.

== Overview ==
Washington State House elections, 2008
Party	Votes	Percentage	Seats	+/–
Democratic	3,098,374	58.33%	62	▼1
Republican	2,157,450	40.62%	36	▲1
Independent	37,323	0.70%	—	—
Green	13,683	0.26%	—	—
Libertarian	5,017	0.09%	—	—
Totals	5,311,847	100.00%	98	—

== Predictions ==
Source	Ranking	As of
Stateline	Safe D	October 15, 2008

== Election results ==
=== District 1 ===
Washington's 1st legislative district House 1 election, 2008
Party	Candidate	Votes	%
Democratic	Al O'Brien	48,791	100.00
Invalid or blank votes			
Total votes		48,791	100.00
Turnout			

Washington's 1st legislative district House 2 election, 2008
Party	Candidate	Votes	%
Democratic	Mark Ericks	47,846	100.00
Invalid or blank votes			
Total votes		47,846	100.00
Turnout			

=== District 2 ===
Washington's 2nd legislative district House 1 election, 2008
Party	Candidate	Votes	%
Republican	Jim McCune	36,417	59.74
Democratic	JeanMarie Christenson	24,540	40.26
Invalid or blank votes			
Total votes		60,957	100.00
Turnout			

Washington's 2nd legislative district House 2 election, 2008
Party	Candidate	Votes	%
Republican	Tom Campbell	35,502	58.27
Democratic	Michael C. Powell	25,424	41.73
Invalid or blank votes			
Total votes		60,926	100.00
Turnout			

=== District 3 ===
Washington's 3rd legislative district House 1 election, 2008
Party	Candidate	Votes	%
Democratic	Alex Wood	28,421	67.36
Republican	Chris Bowen	13,774	32.64
Invalid or blank votes			
Total votes		42,195	100.00
Turnout			

Washington's 3rd legislative district House 2 election, 2008
Party	Candidate	Votes	%
Democratic	Timm Ormsby	27,385	65.14
Republican	Mike Novak	14,655	34.86
Invalid or blank votes			
Total votes		42,040	100.00
Turnout			

=== District 4 ===
Washington's 4th legislative district House 1 election, 2008
Party	Candidate	Votes	%
Democratic	Linda J. Thompson	27,614	43.61
Republican	Larry Crouse	35,703	56.39
Invalid or blank votes			
Total votes		63,317	100.00
Turnout			

Washington's 4th legislative district House 2 election, 2008
Party	Candidate	Votes	%
Democratic	Tim Hattenburg	26,301	41.53
Republican	Matt Shea	37,032	58.47
Invalid or blank votes			
Total votes		63,333	100.00
Turnout			

=== District 5 ===
Washington's 5th legislative district House 1 election, 2008
Party	Candidate	Votes	%
Democratic	Jon Viebrock	28,089	40.29
Republican	Jay Rodne	41,630	59.71
Invalid or blank votes			
Total votes		69,719	100.00
Turnout			

Washington's 5th legislative district House 2 election, 2008
Party	Candidate	Votes	%
Democratic	David Spring	33,712	48.42
Republican	Glenn Anderson	35,913	51.58
Invalid or blank votes			
Total votes		69,625	100.00
Turnout			

=== District 6 ===
Washington's 6th legislative district House 1 election, 2008
Party	Candidate	Votes	%
Democratic	Don Barlow	33,050	47.15
Republican	Kevin Parker	37,050	52.85
Invalid or blank votes			
Total votes		70,100	100.00
Turnout			

Washington's 6th legislative district House 2 election, 2008
Party	Candidate	Votes	%
Democratic	John F. Driscoll	35,107	50.05
Republican	John Ahern	35,033	49.95
Invalid or blank votes			
Total votes		70,140	100.00
Turnout			

=== District 7 ===
Incumbent Representative Bob Sump retired.

Washington's 7th legislative district House 1 election, 2008
Party	Candidate	Votes	%
Republican	Shelly Short	30,356	57.38
Republican	Sue Lani Madsen	22,544	42.62
Invalid or blank votes			
Total votes		52,900	100.00
Turnout			

Washington's 7th legislative district House 2 election, 2008
Party	Candidate	Votes	%
Republican	Joel Kretz	52,900	100.00
Invalid or blank votes			
Total votes		46,486	100.00
Turnout			

=== District 8 ===
Washington's 8th legislative district House 1 election, 2008
Party	Candidate	Votes	%
Democratic	Carol L. Moser	28,278	47.49
Republican	Brad Klippert	31,266	52.51
Invalid or blank votes			
Total votes		59,544	100.00
Turnout			

Washington's 8th legislative district House 2 election, 2008
Party	Candidate	Votes	%
Republican	Larry Haler	33,987	60.18
Republican	Rob Welch	22,493	39.82
Invalid or blank votes			
Total votes		56,480	100.00
Turnout			

=== District 9 ===
Washington's 9th legislative district House 1 election, 2008
Party	Candidate	Votes	%
Democratic	Kenneth E. Caylor	17,195	34.94
Republican	Steve Hailey	32,022	65.06
Invalid or blank votes			
Total votes		49,217	100.00
Turnout			

Washington's 9th legislative district House 2 election, 2008
Party	Candidate	Votes	%
Democratic	Tyana Kelley	18,258	36.61
Republican	Joe Schmick	31,611	63.39
Invalid or blank votes			
Total votes		49,869	100.00
Turnout			

=== District 10 ===
Washington's 10th legislative district House 1 election, 2008
Party	Candidate	Votes	%
Democratic	Tim Knue	33,558	49.64
Republican	Norma Smith	34,038	50.36
Invalid or blank votes			
Total votes		67,596	100.00
Turnout			

Washington's 10th legislative district House 2 election, 2008
Party	Candidate	Votes	%
Democratic	Patricia J. Terry	29,833	44.59
Republican	Barbara Bailey	37,068	55.41
Invalid or blank votes			
Total votes		66,901	100.00
Turnout			

=== District 11 ===
Washington's 11th legislative district House 1 election, 2008
Party	Candidate	Votes	%
Democratic	Zack Hudgins	27,817	72.10
Republican	David M. Morris	10,764	27.90
Invalid or blank votes			
Total votes		38,581	100.00
Turnout			

Washington's 11th legislative district House 2 election, 2008
Party	Candidate	Votes	%
Democratic	Bob Hasegawa	29,289	73.92
Republican	John Potter	10,335	26.08
Invalid or blank votes			
Total votes		39,624	100.00
Turnout			

=== District 12 ===
Washington's 12th legislative district House 1 election, 2008
Party	Candidate	Votes	%
Republican	Cary Condotta	40,662	100.00
Invalid or blank votes			
Total votes		40,662	100.00
Turnout			

Washington's 12th legislative district House 2 election, 2008
Party	Candidate	Votes	%
Republican	Mike Armstrong	28,020	56.25
Republican	Courtney Cox	21,789	43.75
Invalid or blank votes			
Total votes		49,809	100.00
Turnout			

=== District 13 ===
Washington's 13th legislative district House 1 election, 2008
Party	Candidate	Votes	%
Republican	Judy Warnick	39,597	100.00
Invalid or blank votes			
Total votes		39,597	100.00
Turnout			

Washington's 13th legislative district House 2 election, 2008
Party	Candidate	Votes	%
Republican	Bill Hinkle	38,616	100.00
Invalid or blank votes			
Total votes		38,616	100.00
Turnout			

=== District 14 ===
Washington's 14th legislative district House 1 election, 2008
Party	Candidate	Votes	%
Democratic	Vickie Ybarra	20,895	46.64
Republican	Norm Johnson	23,790	53.10
Invalid or blank votes			
Total votes			100.00
Turnout			79.90

Washington's 14th legislative district House 2 election, 2008
Party	Candidate	Votes	%
Democratic	Christopher Ramirez	12,618	28.75
Republican	Charles Ross	31,175	71.02
Invalid or blank votes			
Total votes			100.00
Turnout			79.90

=== District 15 ===
Washington's 15th legislative district House 1 election, 2008
Party	Candidate	Votes	%
Democratic	John (Jobs) Gotts	15,228	39.01
Republican	Bruce Chandler	23,807	60.99
Invalid or blank votes			
Total votes		39,035	100.00
Turnout			

Washington's 15th legislative district House 2 election, 2008
Party	Candidate	Votes	%
Democratic	Tao Berman	14,647	37.28
Republican	Daniel Newhouse	24,637	62.72
Invalid or blank votes			
Total votes		39,284	100.00
Turnout			

=== District 16 ===
Washington's 16th legislative district House 1 election, 2008
Party	Candidate	Votes	%
Democratic	Dante Lee Montoya	13,885	27.45
Republican	Maureen Walsh	36,697	72.55
Invalid or blank votes			
Total votes		50,582	100.00
Turnout			

Washington's 16th legislative district House 2 election, 2008
Party	Candidate	Votes	%
Democratic	Bill Grant	27,648	53.87
Republican	Terry R. Nealey	23,673	46.13
Invalid or blank votes			
Total votes		51,321	100.00
Turnout			

=== District 17 ===
Representative Jim Dunn is retiring.

Washington's 17th legislative district House 1 election, 2008
Party	Candidate	Votes	%
Democratic	Tim Probst	31,791	55.83
Republican	Joseph James	25,147	44.17
Invalid or blank votes			
Total votes		56,938	100.00
Turnout			

Washington's 17th legislative district House 2 election, 2008
Party	Candidate	Votes	%
Democratic	Deb Wallace	35,046	61.31
Republican	Micheline Doan	22,119	38.69
Invalid or blank votes			
Total votes		57,165	100.00
Turnout			

=== District 18 ===
Incumbent Representative Richard Curtis is retiring.

Washington's 18th legislative district House 1 election, 2008
Party	Candidate	Votes	%
Democratic	Vanessa Duplessie	28,226	39.99
Republican	Jaime Herrera	42,355	60.01
Invalid or blank votes			
Total votes		70,581	100.00
Turnout			

Washington's 18th legislative district House 2 election, 2008
Party	Candidate	Votes	%
Democratic	Jonathan Fant	25,196	35.76
Republican	Ed Orcutt	45,268	64.24
Invalid or blank votes			
Total votes		70,464	100.00
Turnout			

=== District 19 ===
Washington's 19th legislative district House 1 election, 2008
Party	Candidate	Votes	%
Democratic	Dean Takko	39,935	100.00
Invalid or blank votes			
Total votes		39,935	100.00
Turnout			

Washington's 19th legislative district House 2 election, 2008
Party	Candidate	Votes	%
Democratic	Brian Blake	39,521	100.00
Invalid or blank votes			
Total votes		39,521	100.00
Turnout			

=== District 20 ===
Washington's 20th legislative district House 1 election, 2008
Party	Candidate	Votes	%
Republican	Richard DeBolt	35,457	57.13
Democratic	Mike Rechner	26,605	42.87
Invalid or blank votes			
Total votes		62,062	100.00
Turnout			

Washington's 20th legislative district House 2 election, 2008
Party	Candidate	Votes	%
Republican	Gary Alexander	38,942	63.27
Democratic	Jim Cutler	22,605	36.73
Invalid or blank votes			
Total votes		61,547	100.00
Turnout			

=== District 21 ===
Washington's 21st legislative district House 1 election, 2008
Party	Candidate	Votes	%
Democratic	Mary Helen Roberts	36,352	67.59
Republican	Brian M. Travis	17,433	32.41
Invalid or blank votes			
Total votes		53,785	100.00
Turnout			

Washington's 21st legislative district House 2 election, 2008
Party	Candidate	Votes	%
Democratic	Marko Liias	34,156	63.94
Republican	Andrew Funk	19,259	36.06
Invalid or blank votes			
Total votes		53,415	100.00
Turnout			

=== District 22 ===
Washington's 22nd legislative district House 1 election, 2008
Party	Candidate	Votes	%
Democratic	Brendan Williams	49,114	100.00
Invalid or blank votes			
Total votes		49,114	100.00
Turnout			

Washington's 22nd legislative district House 2 election, 2008
Party	Candidate	Votes	%
Democratic	Sam Hunt	46,440	70.50
Republican	Don Crawford	19,435	29.50
Invalid or blank votes			
Total votes		65,875	100.00
Turnout			

=== District 23 ===
Washington's 23rd legislative district House 1 election, 2008
Party	Candidate	Votes	%
Democratic	Sherry Appleton	39,835	61.98%
Republican	Larry Cooney	24,479	38.02%
Total votes		64,314	100.00
Turnout			

Washington's 23rd legislative district House 2 election, 2008
Party	Candidate	Votes	%
Democratic	Christine Rolfes	39,130	61.04%
Republican	Mark Lowe	24,973	38.96%
Total votes		64,103	100.00
Turnout			

=== District 24 ===
Washington's 24th legislative district House 1 election, 2008
Party	Candidate	Votes	%
Democratic	Kevin Van De Wege	44,256	65.31%
Republican	Thomas Thomas	23,503	34.69%
Total votes		67,759	100.00
Turnout			

Washington's 24th legislative district House 2 election, 2008
Party	Candidate	Votes	%
Democratic	Lynn Kessler	44,338	64.62%
Republican	Robert (Randy) Dutton	24,274	35.38%
Total votes		68,612	100.00
Turnout			

=== District 25 ===
Incumbent Representative Joyce McDonald is retiring.

Washington's 25th legislative district House 1 election, 2008
Party	Candidate	Votes	%
Democratic	Rob Cerqui	26,467	45.94%
Republican	Bruce Dammeier	31,141	54.06%
Invalid or blank votes			
Total votes		57,608	100.00
Turnout			

Washington's 25th legislative district House 2 election, 2008
Party	Candidate	Votes	%
Democratic	Dawn Morrell	33,451	58.30%
Republican	Ron Morehouse	23,931	41.70%
Invalid or blank votes			
Total votes		57,382	100.00
Turnout			

=== District 26 ===
Incumbent Representative Patricia Lantz is retiring.

Washington's 26th legislative district House 1 election, 2008
Party	Candidate	Votes	%
Democratic	Kim Abel	29,407	46.67%
Republican	Jan Angel	33,602	53.33%
Invalid or blank votes			
Total votes		63,009	100.00
Turnout			

Washington's 26th legislative district House 2 election, 2008
Party	Candidate	Votes	%
Democratic	Larry Seaquist	36,183	58.13%
Republican	Marlyn Jensen	26,059	41.87%
Invalid or blank votes			
Total votes		62,242	100.00
Turnout			

=== District 27 ===
Washington's 27th legislative district House 1 election, 2008
Party	Candidate	Votes	%
Democratic	Dennis Flannigan	30,822	70.72%
Democratic	Jessica Smeall	12,759	29.28%
Invalid or blank votes			
Total votes		43,581	100.00
Turnout			

Washington's 27th legislative district House 2 election, 2008
Party	Candidate	Votes	%
Democratic	Jeannie Darneille	34,533	74.14%
Republican	William Edward Chovil	12,047	25.86%
Invalid or blank votes			
Total votes		46,580	100.00
Turnout			

=== District 28 ===
Washington's 28th legislative district House 1 election, 2008
Party	Candidate	Votes	%
Republican	Dave Dooley	18,096	39.8
Democratic	Troy Kelley	28,591	60.2
Total votes		47,497	100.00

Washington's 28th legislative district House 2 election, 2008
Party	Candidate	Votes	%
Democratic	Tami Green	27,987	58.17
Republican	Denise McCluskey	20,125	41.83
Total votes		48,112	100.00

=== District 29 ===
Washington's 29th legislative district House 1 election, 2008
Party	Candidate	Votes	%
Democratic	Steve Conway	24,672	70.01
Republican	Steven T. Cook	10,568	29.99
Total votes		35,240	100.00

Washington's 29th legislative district House 2 election, 2008
Party	Candidate	Votes	%
Democratic	Steve Kirby	24,749	70.55
Republican	Terry Harder	10,332	29.45
Total votes		35,081	100.00

=== District 30 ===
Washington's 30th legislative district House 1 election, 2008
Party	Candidate	Votes	%
Democratic	Mark Miloscia		
Republican	Michael Thompson		
Invalid or blank votes			
Total votes			100.00
Turnout			

Washington's 30th legislative district House 2 election, 2008
Party	Candidate	Votes	%
Democratic	Carol Gregory		
Republican	Skip Priest		
Invalid or blank votes			
Total votes			100.00
Turnout			

=== District 31 ===
Washington's 31st legislative district House 1 election, 2008
Party	Candidate	Votes	%
Democratic	Ron Weigelt		
Republican	Dan Roach		
Invalid or blank votes			
Total votes			100.00
Turnout			

Washington's 31st legislative district House 2 election, 2008
Party	Candidate	Votes	%
Democratic	Christopher Hurst		
Republican	Sharon Hanek		
Invalid or blank votes			
Total votes			100.00
Turnout			

=== District 32 ===
Washington's 32nd legislative district House 1 election, 2008
Party	Candidate	Votes	%
Democratic	Maralyn Chase		
Republican	Alex Rion		
Invalid or blank votes			
Total votes			100.00
Turnout			

Washington's 32nd legislative district House 2 election, 2008
Party	Candidate	Votes	%
Democratic	Ruth Kagi		
Invalid or blank votes			
Total votes			100.00
Turnout			

=== District 33 ===
Representative Shay Schual-Berke is retiring.

Washington's 33rd legislative district House 1 election, 2008
Party	Candidate	Votes	%
Democratic	Tina L. Orwall		
Republican	Todd Gibson		
Invalid or blank votes			
Total votes			100.00
Turnout			

Washington's 33rd legislative district House 2 election, 2008
Party	Candidate	Votes	%
Democratic	Dave Upthegrove		
Republican	Tan Lam		
Invalid or blank votes			
Total votes			100.00
Turnout			

=== District 34 ===
Washington's 34th legislative district House 1 election, 2008
Party	Candidate	Votes	%
Democratic	Eileen Cody		
Invalid or blank votes			
Total votes			100.00
Turnout			

Washington's 34th legislative district House 2 election, 2008
Party	Candidate	Votes	%
Democratic	Sharon K. Nelson		
Invalid or blank votes			
Total votes			100.00
Turnout			

=== District 35 ===
Washington's 35th legislative district House 1 election, 2008
Party	Candidate	Votes	%
Democratic	Kathy Haigh		
Republican	Marco Brown		
Invalid or blank votes			
Total votes			100.00
Turnout			

Representative William "Ike" Eickmeyer is retiring.

Washington's 35th legislative district House 2 election, 2008
Party	Candidate	Votes	%
Democratic	Fred Finn		
Republican	Randy Neatherlin		
Invalid or blank votes			
Total votes			100.00
Turnout			

=== District 36 ===
Representative Helen Sommers is retiring.

Washington's 36th legislative district House 1 election, 2008
Party	Candidate	Votes	%
Democratic	Reuven Carlyle		
Democratic	John Burbank		
Invalid or blank votes			
Total votes			100.00
Turnout			

Washington's 36th legislative district House 2 election, 2008
Party	Candidate	Votes	%
Democratic	Mary Lou Dickerson		
Republican	Leslie Klein		
Invalid or blank votes			
Total votes			100.00
Turnout			

=== District 37 ===
Washington's 37th legislative district House 1 election, 2008
Party	Candidate	Votes	%
Democratic	Sharon Tomiko Santos		
Invalid or blank votes			
Total votes			100.00
Turnout			

Washington's 37th legislative district House 2 election, 2008
Party	Candidate	Votes	%
Democratic	Eric Pettigrew		
Libertarian	Ruth E. Bennett		
Invalid or blank votes			
Total votes			100.00
Turnout			

=== District 38 ===
Washington's 38th legislative district House 1 election, 2008
Party	Candidate	Votes	%
Democratic	John McCoy		
Independent	Cris Larson		
Invalid or blank votes			
Total votes			100.00
Turnout			

Washington's 38th legislative district House 2 election, 2008
Party	Candidate	Votes	%
Democratic	Mike Sells		
Invalid or blank votes			
Total votes			100.00
Turnout			

=== District 39 ===
Washington's 39th legislative district House 1 election, 2008
Party	Candidate	Votes	%
Democratic	Scott Olson		
Republican	Dan Kristiansen		
Invalid or blank votes			
Total votes			100.00
Turnout			

Washington's 39th legislative district House 2 election, 2008
Party	Candidate	Votes	%
Democratic	David E. Personius		
Republican	Kirk Pearson		
Invalid or blank votes			
Total votes			100.00
Turnout			

=== District 40 ===
Washington's 40th legislative district House 1 election, 2008
Party	Candidate	Votes	%
Democratic	Dave Quall		
Invalid or blank votes			
Total votes			100.00
Turnout			

Washington's 40th legislative district House 2 election, 2008
Party	Candidate	Votes	%
Democratic	Jeff Morris		
Green	Howard Pellett		
Invalid or blank votes			
Total votes			100.00
Turnout			

=== District 41 ===
Washington's 41st legislative district House 1 election, 2008
Party	Candidate	Votes	%
Democratic	Marcie Maxwell		
Republican	Steve Litzow		
Invalid or blank votes			
Total votes			100.00
Turnout			

Washington's 41st legislative district House 2 election, 2008
Party	Candidate	Votes	%
Democratic	Judy Clibborn		
Invalid or blank votes			
Total votes			100.00
Turnout			

=== District 42 ===
Washington's 42nd legislative district House 1 election, 2008
Party	Candidate	Votes	%
Democratic	Mark Flanders		
Republican	Doug Ericksen		
Invalid or blank votes			
Total votes			100.00
Turnout			

Washington's 42nd legislative district House 2 election, 2008
Party	Candidate	Votes	%
Democratic	Kelli Linville		
Republican	Jere Hawn		
Invalid or blank votes			
Total votes			100.00
Turnout			

=== District 43 ===
Washington's 43rd legislative district House 1 election, 2008
Party	Candidate	Votes	%
Democratic	Jamie Pedersen	55,491	100.00
Total votes		55,491	100.00

Washington's 43rd legislative district House 2 election, 2008
Party	Candidate	Votes	%
Democratic	Frank Chopp	55,163	86.85
Republican	Kim Verde	8,353	13.15
Total votes		63,516	100.00

=== District 44 ===
Washington's 44th legislative district House 1 election, 2008
Party	Candidate	Votes	%
Democratic	Hans Dunshee	41,531	60.99
Republican	Larry Countryman	26,561	39.01
Total votes		68,092	100.00

Washington's 44th legislative district House 2 election, 2008
Party	Candidate	Votes	%
Democratic	Liz Loomis	34,319	49.91
Republican	Mike Hope	34,437	50.09
Total votes		68,756	100.00

=== District 45 ===
Washington's 45th legislative district House 1 election, 2008
Party	Candidate	Votes	%
Democratic	Roger Goodman	34,585	54.48
Republican	Toby Nixon	28,898	45.52
Total votes		63,483	100.00

Washington's 45th legislative district House 2 election, 2008
Party	Candidate	Votes	%
Republican	Kevin Haistings	25,000	40.28
Democratic	Larry Springer	37,058	59.72
Total votes		62,058	100.00

=== District 46 ===
Representative Jim McIntire is running for State Treasurer.

Washington's 46th legislative district House 1 election, 2008
Party	Candidate	Votes	%
Democratic	Scott White	42,410	71.58 %
Democratic	Gerry Pollet	16,842	28.42 %
Invalid or blank votes			
Total votes		59,252	100.00
Turnout			

Washington's 46th legislative district House 2 election, 2008
Party	Candidate	Votes	%
Democratic	Phyllis Kenney	50,943	82.86 %
Republican	John Sweeney	10,538	17.14 %
Invalid or blank votes			
Total votes		61,481	100.00
Turnout			

=== District 47 ===
Washington's 47th legislative district House 1 election, 2008
Party	Candidate	Votes	%
Democratic	Geoff Simpson	27,439	52.62%
Republican	Mark Hargrove	24,707	47.38%
Invalid or blank votes			
Total votes		52,146	100.00
Turnout			

Washington's 47th legislative district House 2 election, 2008
Party	Candidate	Votes	%
Democratic	Pat Sullivan	29,949	58.42%
Republican	Timothy Miller	21,319	41.58%
Invalid or blank votes			
Total votes		51,268	100.00
Turnout			

=== District 48 ===
Washington's 48th legislative district House 1 election, 2008
Party	Candidate	Votes	%
Democratic	Ross Hunter	32,586	64.32%
Republican	Charles A. Lapp	18,074	35.68%
Invalid or blank votes			
Total votes		50,660	100.00
Turnout			

Washington's 48th legislative district House 2 election, 2008
Party	Candidate	Votes	%
Democratic	Deborah Eddy	29,560	59.49%
Republican	Ronald G. Fuller	20,128	40.51%
Invalid or blank votes			
Total votes		49,688	100.00
Turnout			

=== District 49 ===
Washington's 49th legislative district House 1 election, 2008
Party	Candidate	Votes	%
Democratic	Jim Jacks	29,721	60.04%
Republican	Debbie Peterson	19,782	39.96%
Invalid or blank votes			
Total votes		49,503	100.00
Turnout			

Washington's 49th legislative district House 2 election, 2008
Party	Candidate	Votes	%
Democratic	Jim Moeller	30,401	62.62%
Independent	Mike Bomar	18,149	37.38%
Invalid or blank votes			
Total votes		48,550	100.00
Turnout			
