= Lynda Wilson =

American politician from Washington

Member of the Washington Senate from the 17th district
- In office January 9, 2017 – January 13, 2025
- Preceded by: Don Benton
- Succeeded by: Paul Harris

Member of the Washington House of Representatives from the 17th district
- In office January 12, 2015 – January 9, 2017
- Preceded by: Monica Stonier
- Succeeded by: Vicki Kraft

Personal details
- Born: 1958 (age 67–68) Spokane, Washington
- Party: Republican
- Education: Clark College (attended)
- Occupation: politician
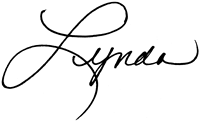
- Signature
- Website: Official

Lynda D. Wilson (born 1958) is an American politician who served in the Washington State Senate representing the 17th legislative district. A member of the Republican Party, she previously served one term Washington State House of Representatives having defeated Democrat and current state representative Monica Stonier in 2014. In 2016, she left the State House to run for a Washington State Senate seat being vacated by Republican Don Benton against Democrat Tim Probst. Wilson represents herself as a strong conservative and has a lifetime rating of 89% from the American Conservative Union (ACU), while outgoing State Senator Don Benton has an ACU rating of 79%.

== Awards ==
- 2020 Guardians of Small Business. Presented by NFIB.
