= 2010 United States House of Representatives elections in Washington =

- November 2, 2010

All 9 Washington seats to the United States House of Representatives
	Majority party	Minority party
Party	Democratic	Republican
Last election	6	3
Seats won	5	4
Seat change	▼1	▲1
Popular vote	1,296,502	1,135,166
Percentage	52.29%	45.78%
Swing	▼6.91%	▲4.98%

Democratic
50–60%
60–70%
80–90%
Republican
50–60%
60–70%
70–80%

Elections were held on November 2, 2010, to determine Washington's nine members of the United States House of Representatives. Representatives were elected for two-year terms to serve in the 112th Congress from January 3, 2011, until January 3, 2013. Nonpartisan blanket primary elections were held on August 17, 2010.

Of the nine elections, the races in the 2nd, 3rd and 8th districts were rated as competitive by CQ Politics, The Rothenberg Political Report and Sabato's Crystal Ball, while The Cook Political Report rated the 2nd, 3rd, 8th and 9th districts as competitive. Every incumbent was re-elected, with the exception of Democrat Brian Baird, the U.S. representative for Washington's 3rd congressional district, who retired rather than seeking re-election. Baird was succeeded by Jaime Herrera Beutler, a Republican.

In total, five Democrats and four Republicans were elected. In the November elections a total of 2,479,409 votes were cast, of which 1,296,502 (52 percent) were for Democratic candidates, 1,135,166 (46 percent) were for Republican candidates, and 47,741 (2 percent) were for an independent candidate.

== Overview ==
Results of the 2010 United States House of Representatives elections in Washington by district:

District	Democratic		Republican		Others		Total		Result
District	Votes	%	Votes	%	Votes	%	Votes	%	Result
District 1	172,642	57.67%	126,737	42.33%	0	0.00%	299,379	100.0%	Democratic hold
District 2	155,241	51.07%	148,722	48.93%	0	0.00%	303,963	100.0%	Democratic hold
District 3	135,654	47.03%	152,799	52.97%	0	0.00%	288,453	100.0%	Republican gain
District 4	74,973	32.36%	156,726	67.64%	0	0.00%	231,699	100.0%	Republican hold
District 5	101,146	36.33%	177,235	63.67%	0	0.00%	278,381	100.0%	Republican hold
District 6	151,873	58.04%	109,800	41.96%	0	0.00%	261,673	100.0%	Democratic hold
District 7	232,649	82.97%	0	0.00%	47,741	17.03%	280,390	100.0%	Democratic hold
District 8	148,581	47.95%	161,296	52.05%	0	0.00%	309,877	100.0%	Republican hold
District 9	123,743	54.85%	101,851	45.15%	0	0.00%	225,594	100.0%	Democratic hold
Total	1,296,502	52.29%	1,135,166	45.78%	47,741	1.93%	2,479,409	100.0%	

Washington's congressional districts in 2010

== District 1 ==
2010 Washington's 1st congressional district election
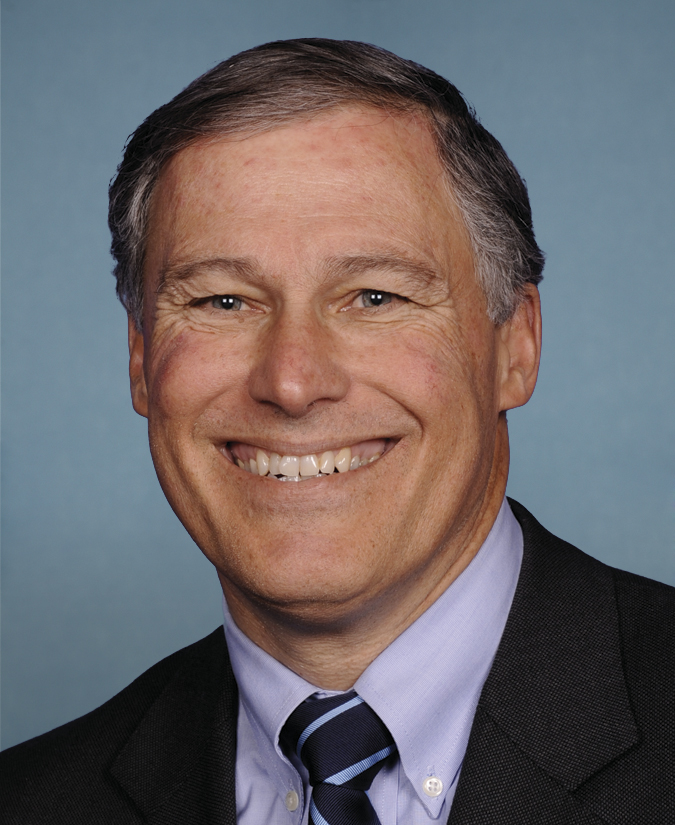

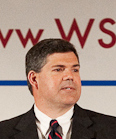
Nominee	Jay Inslee	James Watkins
Party	Democratic	Republican
Popular vote	172,642	126,737
Percentage	57.7%	42.3%
- County results Inslee: 50–60% 60–70%
U.S. Representative before election
Jay Inslee
Democratic
Elected U.S. Representative
Jay Inslee
Democratic

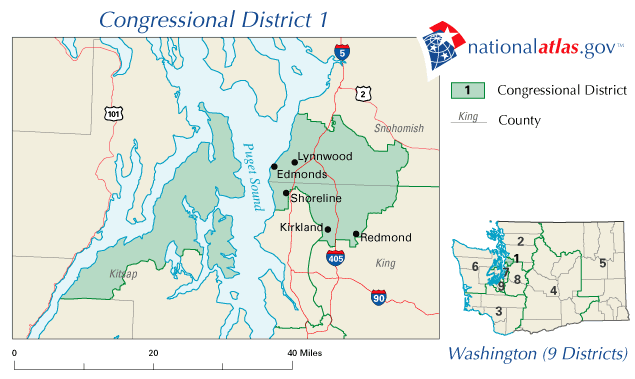
Washington's 1st congressional district in 2010

In 2010 the 1st district included Bothell, Edmonds, Lynnwood and parts of Kirkland, Redmond and Shoreline. The district's population was 77 percent white, 10 percent Asian and 6 percent Hispanic (see Race and ethnicity in the United States census); 94 percent were high school graduates and 41 percent had received a bachelor's degree or higher. Its median income was $73,943. In the 2008 presidential election the district gave 62 percent of its vote to Democratic nominee Barack Obama and 36 percent of its vote to Republican nominee John McCain.

Democrat Jay Inslee, who took office in 1999, was the incumbent. Inslee was re-elected in 2008 with 68 per cent of the vote. In 2010 Inslee's opponent in the general election was James Watkins, a businessman and a member of the Republican Party. Matthew Burke, a financial planner, also ran as a Republican; and David D. Schirle, a former physician and a member of the Washington National Guard, ran as an independent candidate.

Inslee raised $1,403,962 and spent $1,270,456. Watkins raised $351,477 and spent $339,770. Burke raised $51,135 and spent $49,931. Schirle raised $9,602 and spent $12,842.

In a Republican internal poll conducted in March 2010 by Moore Information, with a sample size of 300 registered voters, 41 percent of respondents supported Inslee while 27 percent favored Watkins. Prior to the election FiveThirtyEight's forecast gave Inslee a 100 percent chance of winning, and projected that he would receive 62 percent of the vote to Watkins's 36 percent. On election day Inslee was re-elected with 58 percent of the vote to Watkins's 42 percent.

Inslee resigned in March 2012 in order to run for Governor of Washington. He was elected to that office in November 2012. Watkins unsuccessfully ran for the position of state auditor in 2012.

=== Primary results ===
Washington's 1st congressional district primary, August 17, 2010
Party	Candidate	Votes	%
Democratic	Jay Inslee (incumbent)	90,208	55.85
Republican	James Watkins	44,269	27.41
Republican	Matthew Burke	20,185	12.50
Independent	David D. Schirle	6,864	4.25
Total votes		161,526	100.00

=== General election ===
==== Polling ====
Poll source	Date(s) administered	Sample size (Note: Key: A – all adults RV – registered voters LV – likely voters V – unclear)	Margin of error	Jay Inslee (D)	James Watkins (R)	Undecided
Wenzel Strategies (R) (Note: Poll sponsored by Watkins' campaign)	March 23–24, 2010	400 (RV)	–	41%	27%	32%

==== Predictions ====
Source	Ranking	As of
The Cook Political Report	Safe D	November 1, 2010
Rothenberg	Safe D	November 1, 2010
Sabato's Crystal Ball	Safe D	November 1, 2010
RCP	Safe D	November 1, 2010
CQ Politics	Safe D	October 28, 2010
New York Times	Safe D	November 1, 2010
FiveThirtyEight	Safe D	November 1, 2010

==== Results ====
2010 Washington's 1st congressional district election
Party	Candidate	Votes	%
Democratic	Jay Inslee (incumbent)	172,642	57.67
Republican	James Watkins	126,737	42.33
Total votes		299,379	100.00

==== By county ====
County results
County	Jay Inslee Democratic		James Watkins Republican		Margin		Total votes
County	#	%	#	%	#	%	Total votes
King (part)	65,449	61.19%	41,508	38.81%	23,941	22.38%	106,957
Kitsap (part)	30,506	55.59%	24,374	44.41%	6,132	11.17%	54,880
Snohomish (part)	76,687	55.76%	60,855	44.24%	15,832	11.51%	137,542
Totals	172,642	57.67%	126,737	42.33%	45,905	15.33%	299,379

== District 2 ==
2010 Washington's 2nd congressional district election
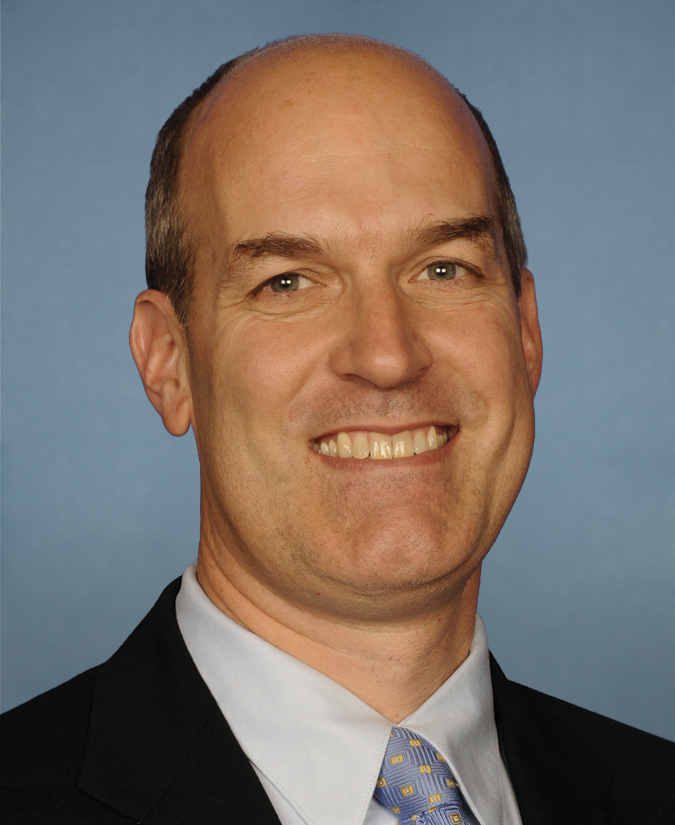

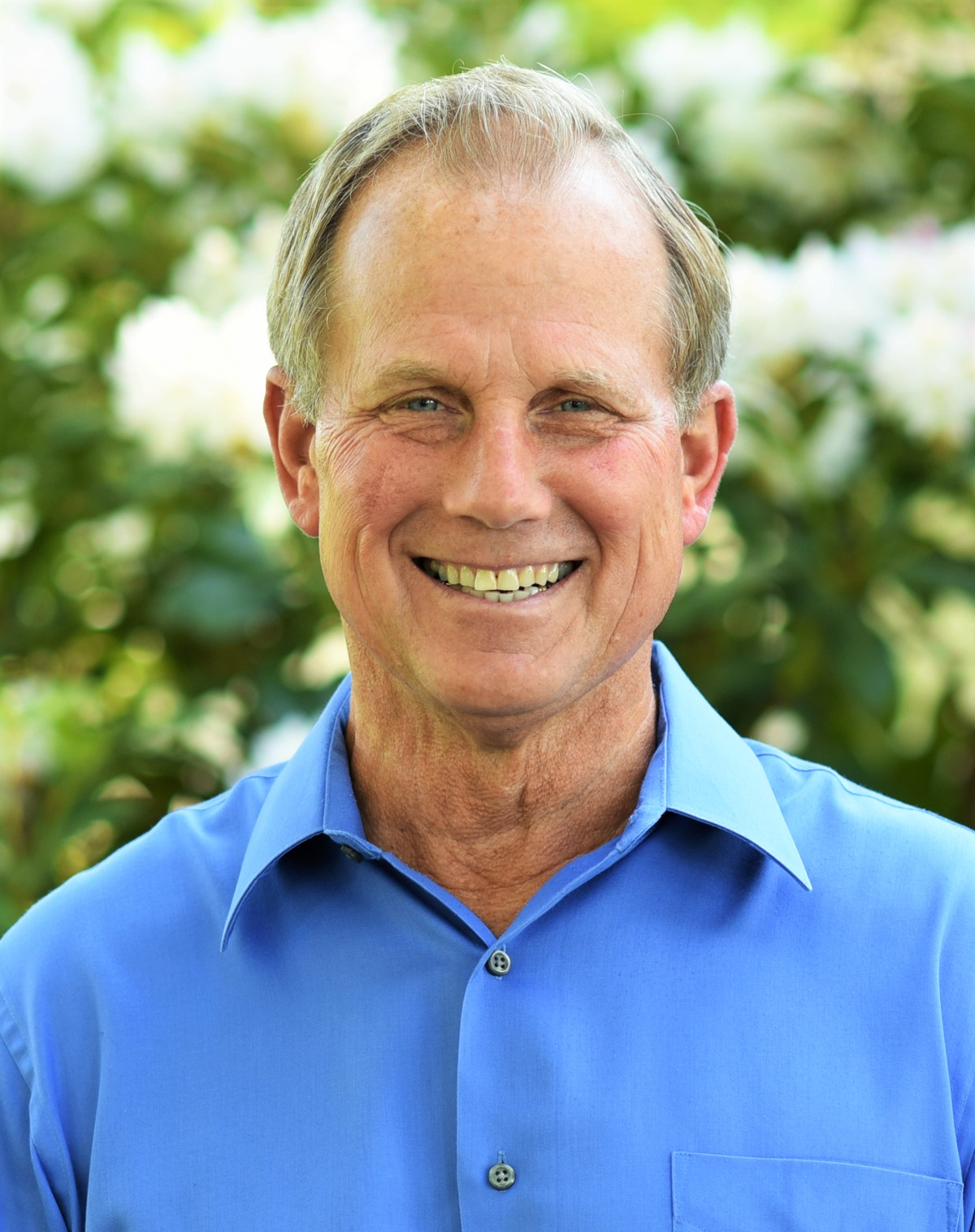
Nominee	Rick Larsen	John Koster
Party	Democratic	Republican
Popular vote	155,241	148,722
Percentage	51.1%	48.9%
- County results Larsen: 50–60% 60–70% Koster: 50–60%
U.S. Representative before election
Rick Larsen
Democratic
Elected U.S. Representative
Rick Larsen
Democratic

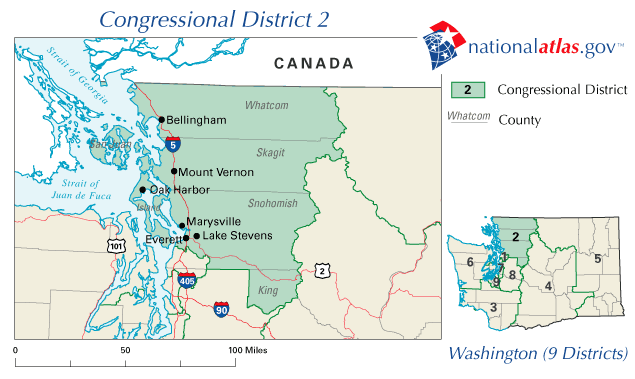
Washington's 2nd congressional district in 2010

The 2nd district included Bellingham, Marysville and parts of Everett. The district's population was 83 percent white and 8 percent Hispanic (see Race and ethnicity in the United States census); 90 percent were high school graduates and 25 percent had received a bachelor's degree or higher. Its median income was $55,887. In the 2008 presidential election the district gave 56 percent of its vote to Democratic nominee Barack Obama and 42 percent to Republican nominee John McCain.

Democrat Rick Larsen, who took office in 2001, was the incumbent. Larsen was re-elected in 2008 with 62 percent of the vote. In 2010 Larsen's opponent in the general election was John Koster, a former member of the Washington House of Representatives and a member of the Republican Party. John Carmack, a structural-mechanical designer and contractor, also ran as a Republican; while Larry Kalb, a member of the Democratic State Committee; and Diana McGinness, a retired fraud investigator, also ran as Democrats.

Larsen raised $2,028,596 and spent $2,080,326. Koster raised $1,100,868 and spent $1,096,191. Kalb raised $22,436 and spent $20,824. McGinness raised $4,922 and spent $4,741.

A Republican internal poll of 300 likely voters conducted by Moore Information in April 2010 found 44 percent of respondents intended to vote for Larsen, while 37 percent favored Koster. In June 2010 Koster's campaign manager cited a poll of 784 respondents conducted for Koster's campaign, in which Koster led Larsen by around 53 percent to 47 percent; however he did not provide a hard copy of the results, which Larsen's campaign manager said were inaccurate. In a poll conducted in August and September 2010 by SurveyUSA, with a sample size of 612 likely voters, 50 percent of respondents supported Koster while 46 percent favored Larsen and 4 percent were undecided. In a SurveyUSA poll of 576 likely voters conducted later in September 2010, Larsen led with 50 percent to Koster's 47 percent, and 3 percent were undecided. In SurveyUSA's final poll of 643 likely and actual voters, conducted in October 2010, Larsen led with 50 percent to Koster's 46 percent, and 3 percent were undecided.

Larsen was re-elected with 51 percent of the vote to Koster's 49 percent. After the initial count Koster led by less than 1,500 votes; however Larsen took the lead on November 3 and was later declared the winner. Larsen was again re-elected in 2012 and in 2014, while Koster unsuccessfully ran in the redrawn 1st district in the 2012 election.

=== Primary results ===
Washington's 2nd congressional district primary election, August 17, 2010
Party	Candidate	Votes	%
Republican	John Koster	74,032	42.18
Democratic	Rick Larsen (incumbent)	73,734	42.01
Democratic	Diana McGinness	10,548	6.01
Republican	John Carmack	9,566	5.45
Democratic	Larry Kalb	7,627	4.35
Total votes		175,507	100.00

=== General election ===
==== Polling ====
Poll source	Date(s) administered	Sample size	Margin of error	Rick Larsen (D)	John Koster (R)	Undecided
SurveyUSA	October 19–21, 2010	643 (LV)	± 3.9%	50%	46%	3%
SurveyUSA	September 26–28, 2010	576 (LV)	± 4.2%	50%	47%	3%
SurveyUSA	August 31 – September 2, 2010	612 (LV)	± 4.0%	46%	50%	4%
Moore Information (R) (Note: Poll sponsored by Koster's campaign)	April 20–21, 2010	300 (LV)	± 6.3%	44%	37%	19%

==== Predictions ====
Source	Ranking	As of
The Cook Political Report	Tossup	November 1, 2010
Rothenberg	Lean D	November 1, 2010
Sabato's Crystal Ball	Lean D	November 1, 2010
RCP	Tossup	November 1, 2010
CQ Politics	Lean D	October 28, 2010
New York Times	Lean D	November 1, 2010
FiveThirtyEight	Likely D	November 1, 2010

==== Results ====
2010 Washington's 2nd congressional district election
Party	Candidate	Votes	%
Democratic	Rick Larsen (incumbent)	155,241	51.07
Republican	John Koster	148,722	48.93
Total votes		303,963	100.00

==== By county ====
County	Rick Larsen Democratic		John Koster Republican		Margin		Total votes cast
County	#	%	#	%	#	%	Total votes cast
Island	17,870	50.01%	17,861	49.99%	9	0.03%	35,731
King (part)	149	57.31%	111	42.69%	38	14.62%	260
San Juan	6,055	66.08%	3,108	33.92%	2,947	32.16%	9,163
Skagit	23,911	49.90%	24,005	50.10%	-94	-0.20%	47,916
Snohomish (part)	61,780	49.12%	63,996	50.88%	-2,216	-1.76%	125,776
Whatcom	45,476	53.43%	39,641	46.57%	5,835	6.86%	85,117
Totals	155,241	51.07%	148,722	48.93%	6,519	2.14%	303,963

== District 3 ==
2010 Washington's 3rd congressional district election
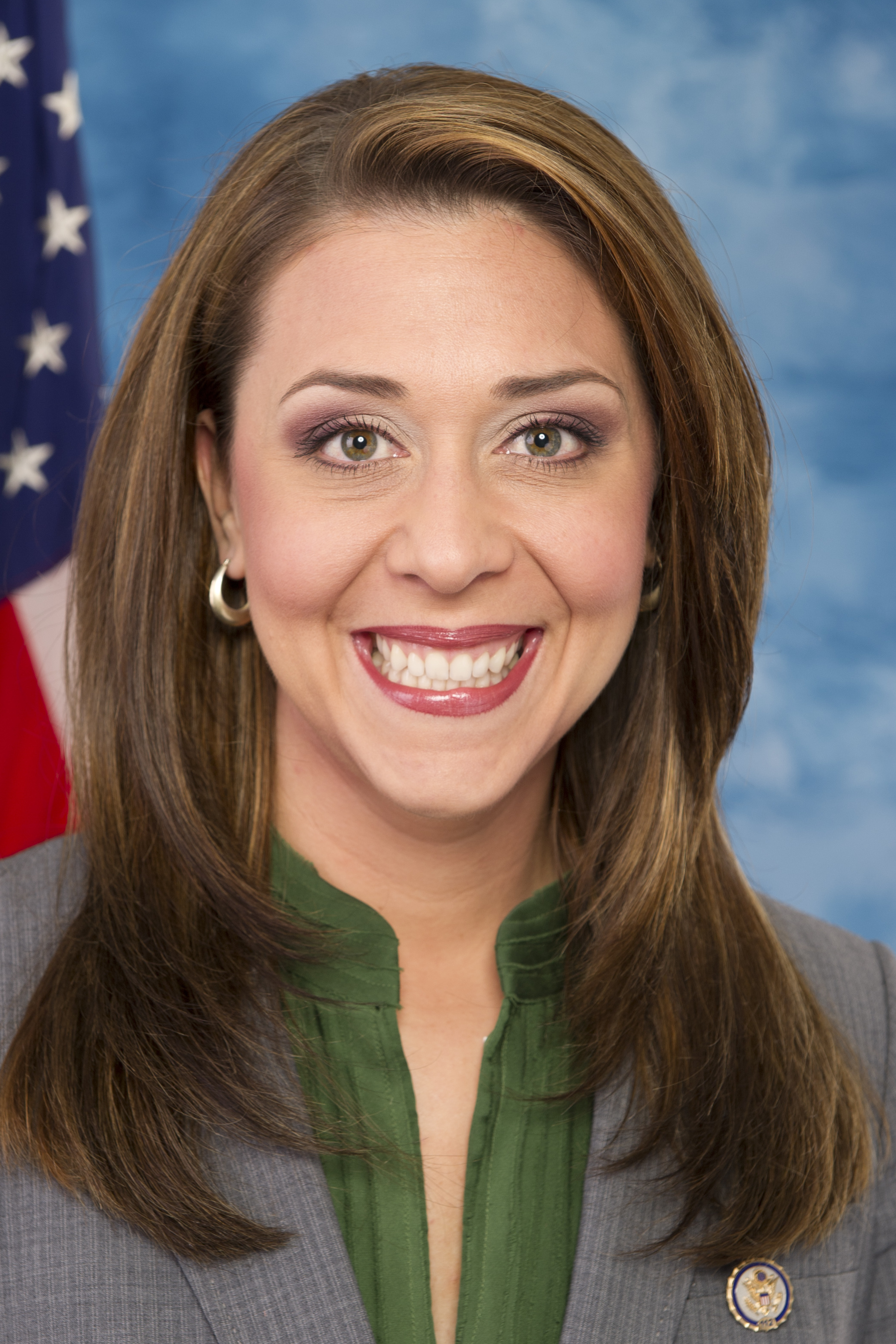

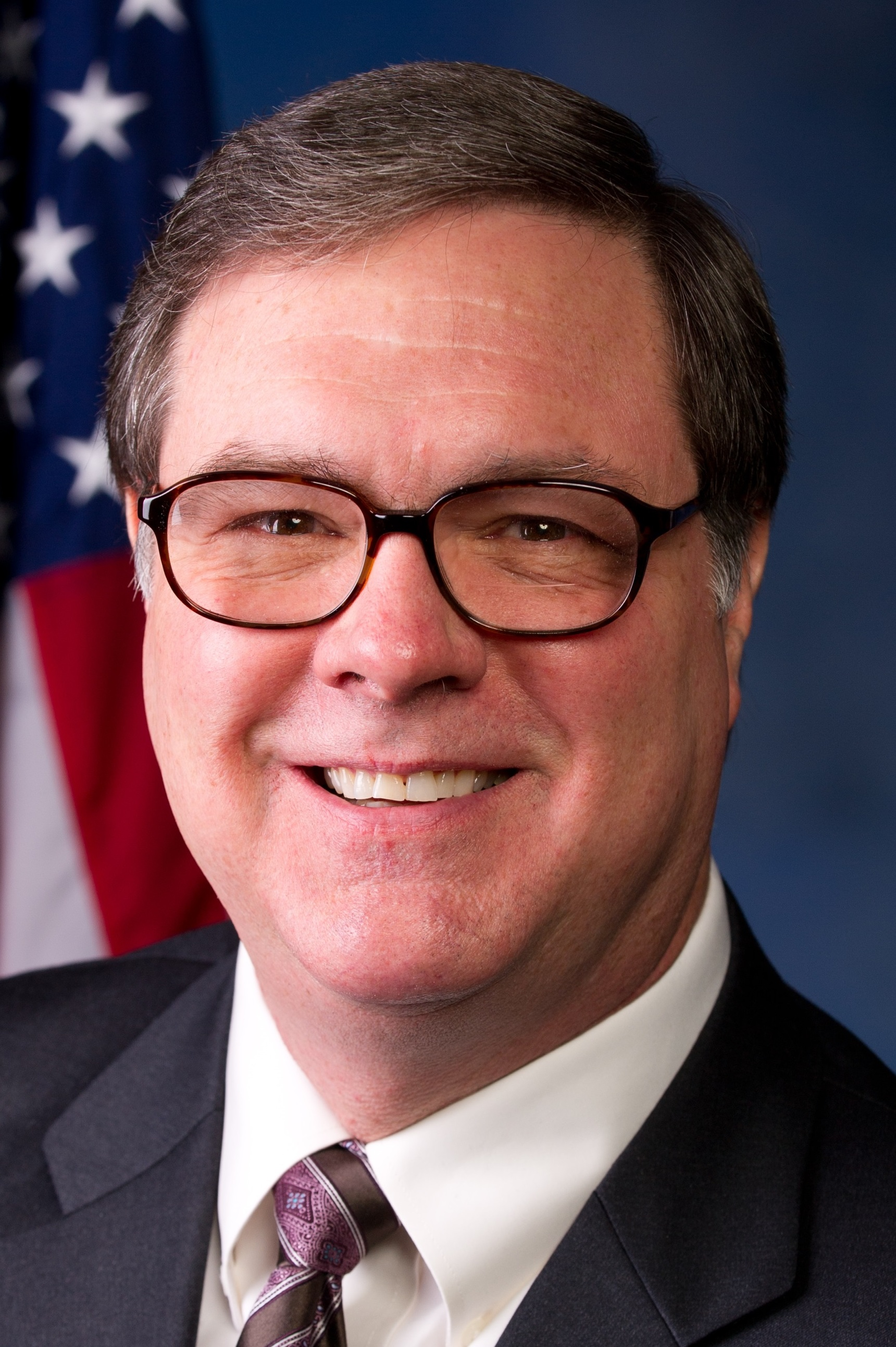
Nominee	Jaime Herrera Beutler	Denny Heck
Party	Republican	Democratic
Popular vote	152,799	135,654
Percentage	53.0%	47.0%
- County results Beutler: 50–60% 60–70% Heck: 50–60%
U.S. Representative before election
Brian Baird
Democratic
Elected U.S. Representative
Jaime Herrera Beutler
Republican

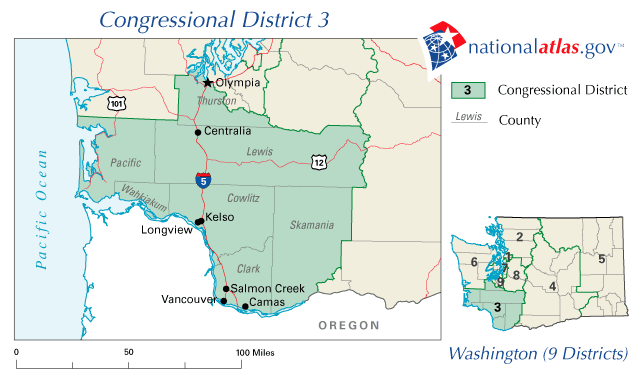
Washington's 3rd congressional district in 2010

The 3rd district included Vancouver and part of Olympia. The district's population was 85 percent white and 6 percent Hispanic (see Race and ethnicity in the United States census); 89 percent were high school graduates and 24 percent had received a bachelor's degree or higher. Its median income was $54,813. In the 2008 presidential election the district gave 53 percent of its vote to Democratic nominee Barack Obama and 45 percent to Republican nominee John McCain.

Democrat Brian Baird, who took office in 1999, was the incumbent. Baird was re-elected in 2008 with 64 percent of the vote. In 2010 Baird retired rather than seeking re-election. The candidates in the general election were Jaime Herrera Beutler, a Republican, and Denny Heck, a Democrat, both of whom were members of the Washington House of Representatives. Cheryl Crist, a Democratic Precinct Committee Officer, also ran as a Democrat; while David B. Castillo, a U.S. Navy veteran, and David W. Hedrick, a management accountant, also ran as Republicans. Norma Jean Stevens, a small business owner, ran as an independent candidate. Deb Wallace, a member of the Washington House of Representatives, Maria Rodriguez-Salazar, a nurse; and Craig Pridemore, a member of the Washington Senate, ran as Democrats but dropped out of the race in February, March and June 2010 respectively. Democrat Brendan Williams, a member of the state House of Representatives, announced in December 2009 that he would not run. Jon Russell, the mayor pro tem of Washougal, ran as a Republican but ended his campaign in February 2010. Richard DeBolt, the leader of the Republican party in the state House of Representatives, announced in January 2010 that he would not run.

Herrera Beutler raised $1,557,221 and spent $1,534,650. Heck raised $1,988,495 and spent $1,965,997. Castillo raised $282,516 and spent £275,436. Crist raised $14,511 and spent $17,141. Hedrick raised $41,358 and spent $27,715. Pridemore raised $114,782 and spent $114,681. Russell raised $30,478 and spent $30,479. Wallace raised $56,907 and spent the same amount.

In a poll of 562 likely voters, conducted in August 2010 by SurveyUSA, 54 percent of respondents supported Herrera Beutler while 41 percent favored Heck and 5 percent were undecided. An internal poll conducted between September 7 and 9, 2010 for Heck's campaign by Greenberg Quinlan Rosner, with a sample size of 502 likely voters, found Herrera Beutler at 47 percent and Heck at 44 percent. In a SurveyUSA poll conducted between September 12 and 14, 2010, with a sample size of 552 likely voters, Herrera Beutler led again with 52 percent to Heck's 43 percent, while 4 percent were undecided. A poll conducted by Penn Schoen Berland from October 2 until October 7, 2010, with a sample size of 400 likely voters, found Herrera leading with 42 percent to Heck's 40 percent. In a SurveyUSA poll conducted from October 10 until October 12, 2010, with a sample size of 597 likely voters, 53 percent of respondents intended to vote for Herrera Beutler while 42 percent favored Heck and 6 percent were undecided. In SurveyUSA's final poll, conducted between October 24 and 25, 2010, with a sample size of 640 likely and actual voters, Herrera Beutler led with 50 percent to Heck's 46 percent, and 4 percent were undecided.

On election day Herrera Beutler was elected with 53 percent of the vote to Heck's 47 percent. Herrera Beutler was re-elected in 2012, when Heck successfully ran in the newly created 10th district; and in 2014.

=== Primary results ===
Results by county Heck: 20–30% 30–40%; Herrera Beutler: 20–30% 30–40%

Washington's 3rd congressional district primary election, August 17, 2010
Party	Candidate	Votes	%
Democratic	Denny Heck	51,895	31.40
Republican	Jaime Herrera Beutler	46,001	27.83
Republican	David W. Hedrick	22,621	13.69
Republican	David B. Castillo	19,995	12.10
Democratic	Cheryl Crist	18,453	11.17
Independent	Norma Jean Stevens	6,309	3.82
Total votes		165,274	100.00

=== General election ===
==== Polling ====
Poll source	Date(s) administered	Sample size	Margin of error	Denny Heck (D)	Jaime Herrera (R)	Undecided
SurveyUSA	October 24–26, 2010	640 (LV)	± 4.0%	46%	50%	4%
SurveyUSA	October 10–12, 2010	579 (LV)	± 4.1%	42%	53%	6%
Penn Schoen Berland (Note: Poll sponsored by The Hill)	October 2–7, 2010	400 (LV)	± 4.9%	40%	42%	15%
SurveyUSA	September 12–14, 2010	552 (LV)	± 4.3%	43%	52%	4%
GQR/Democracy Corps (D) (Note: Poll sponsored by Heck's campaign)	September 7–9, 2010	502 (LV)	± 4.4%	44%	47%	9%
SurveyUSA	August 23–24, 2010	562 (LV)	± 4.2%	41%	54%	5%

==== Predictions ====
Source	Ranking	As of
The Cook Political Report	Lean R (flip)	November 1, 2010
Rothenberg	Tilt R (flip)	November 1, 2010
Sabato's Crystal Ball	Lean R (flip)	November 1, 2010
RCP	Tossup	November 1, 2010
CQ Politics	Lean R (flip)	October 28, 2010
New York Times	Lean R (flip)	November 1, 2010
FiveThirtyEight	Likely R (flip)	November 1, 2010

==== Results ====
2010 Washington's 3rd congressional district election
Party	Candidate	Votes	%
Republican	Jaime Herrera Beutler	152,799	52.97
Democratic	Denny Heck	135,654	47.03
Total votes		288,453	100.00

==== By county ====
County results
County	Denny Heck Democratic		Jaime Herrera Beutler Republican		Margin		Total votes
County	#	%	#	%	#	%	Total votes
Clark	64,853	44.66%	80,368	55.34%	15,515	10.68%	145,221
Cowlitz	17,513	47.97%	18,995	52.03%	1,482	4.06%	36,508
Lewis	10,052	33.06%	20,351	66.94%	10,299	33.87%	30,403
Pacific	5,169	54.25%	4,359	45.75%	-810	-8.50%	9,528
Skamania (part)	1,476	45.39%	1,776	54.61%	300	9.23%	3,252
Thurston (part)	35,677	57.96%	25,878	42.04%	-9,799	-15.92%	61,555
Wahkiakum	914	46.02%	1,072	53.98%	158	7.96%	1,986
Totals	135,654	47.03%	152,799	52.97%	17,145	5.94%	288,453

== District 4 ==
2010 Washington's 4th congressional district election
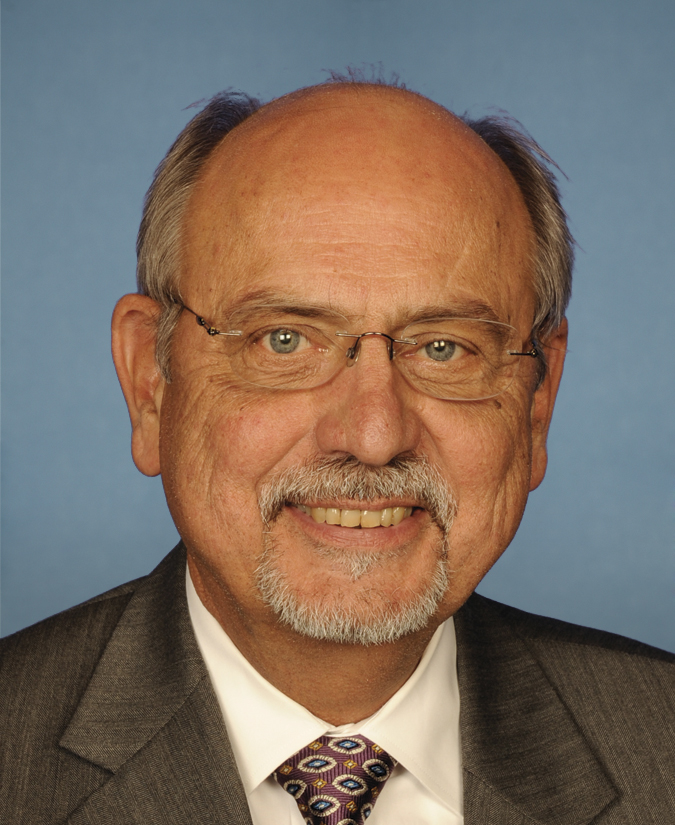

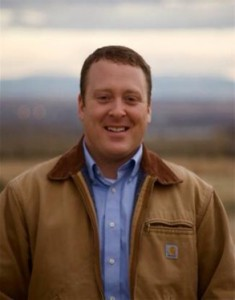
Nominee	Doc Hastings	Jay Clough
Party	Republican	Democratic
Popular vote	156,726	74,973
Percentage	67.6%	32.4%
- County results Hastings: 50–60% 60–70% 70–80%
U.S. Representative before election
Doc Hastings
Republican
Elected U.S. Representative
Doc Hastings
Republican

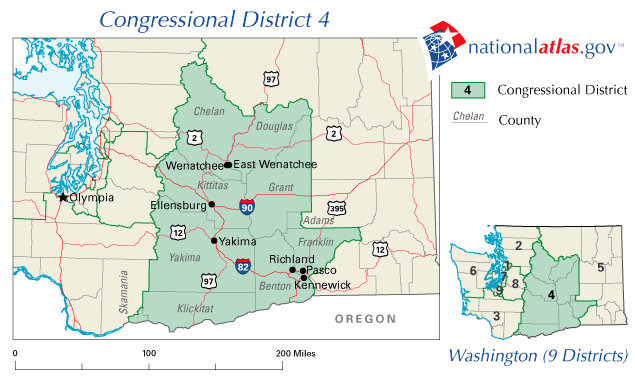
Washington's 4th congressional district in 2010

The 4th district included Kennewick, Pasco, Richland and Yakima. The district's population was 64 percent white and 31 percent Hispanic (see Race and ethnicity in the United States census); 78 percent were high school graduates and 19 percent had received a bachelor's degree or higher. Its median income was $45,616. In the 2008 presidential election the district gave 58 percent of its vote to Republican nominee John McCain and 40 percent to Democratic nominee Barack Obama.

Republican Doc Hastings, who took office in 1995, was the incumbent. Hastings was re-elected in 2008 with 63 percent of the vote. In 2010 Hastings's opponent in the general election was Jay Clough, a member of the United States Marine Corps who ran as a Democrat. Shane Fast, a business owner, also ran as a Republican. Rex A. Brocki, a chapter president of Young Americans for Freedom, ran as a Tea Party movement candidate. Mary Ruth Edwards, a teacher, ran as the Constitution Party candidate. Leland Yialelis, a pastor, ran as an independent candidate.

Hastings raised $1,056,576 and spent $1,089,271. Clough raised $119,993 and spent $118,863. Yialelis raised $5,534 and spent the same amount. Prior to the election FiveThirtyEight's forecast gave Hastings a 100 percent chance of winning, and projected that he would receive 67 percent of the vote to Clough's 30 percent.

On election day Hastings was re-elected with 68 percent of the vote to Clough's 32 percent. Hastings was again re-elected in 2012, while Clough ran for a seat in the Washington House of Representatives. Hastings retired rather than seeking re-election in 2014 and will be succeeded by Republican Dan Newhouse.

=== Primary results ===
Washington's 4th congressional district primary election, August 17, 2010
Party	Candidate	Votes	%
Republican	Doc Hastings (incumbent)	82,909	58.74
Democratic	Jay Clough	31,782	22.52
Tea Party	Rex A. Brocki	9,826	6.96
Republican	Shane Fast	9,214	6.53
Constitution	Mary Ruth Edwards	4,270	3.03
Independent	Leland Yialelis	3,136	2.22
Total votes		141,137	100.00

==== Predictions ====
Source	Ranking	As of
The Cook Political Report	Safe R	November 1, 2010
Rothenberg	Safe R	November 1, 2010
Sabato's Crystal Ball	Safe R	November 1, 2010
RCP	Safe R	November 1, 2010
CQ Politics	Safe R	October 28, 2010
New York Times	Safe R	November 1, 2010
FiveThirtyEight	Safe R	November 1, 2010

=== General election results ===
2010 Washington's 4th congressional district election
Party	Candidate	Votes	%
Republican	Doc Hastings (incumbent)	156,726	67.64
Democratic	Jay Clough	74,973	32.36
Total votes		231,699	100.00

==== By county ====
County results
County	Doc Hastings Republican		Jay Clough Democratic		Margin		Total votes
County	#	%	#	%	#	%	Total votes
Adams (part)	1,310	74.86%	440	25.14%	870	49.71%	1,750
Benton	42,556	68.14%	19,897	31.86%	22,659	36.28%	62,453
Chelan	18,464	67.67%	8,821	32.33%	9,643	35.34%	27,285
Douglas	9,324	71.37%	3,741	28.63%	5,583	42.73%	13,065
Franklin	11,888	69.25%	5,280	30.75%	6,608	38.49%	17,168
Grant	17,928	75.76%	5,736	24.24%	12,192	51.52%	23,664
Kittitas	9,418	63.17%	5,490	36.83%	3,928	26.35%	14,908
Klickitat	5,341	62.21%	3,244	37.79%	2,097	24.43%	8,585
Skamania (part)	711	59.35%	487	40.65%	224	18.70%	1,198
Yakima	39,786	64.56%	21,837	35.44%	17,949	29.13%	61,623
Totals	156,726	67.64%	74,973	32.36%	81,753	35.28%	231,699

=== External links ===
- "Rex A. Brocki campaign website". Archived from the original on July 20, 2010.
- "Mary Ruth Edwards campaign website". Archived from the original on August 12, 2010.

== District 5 ==
2010 Washington's 5th congressional district election
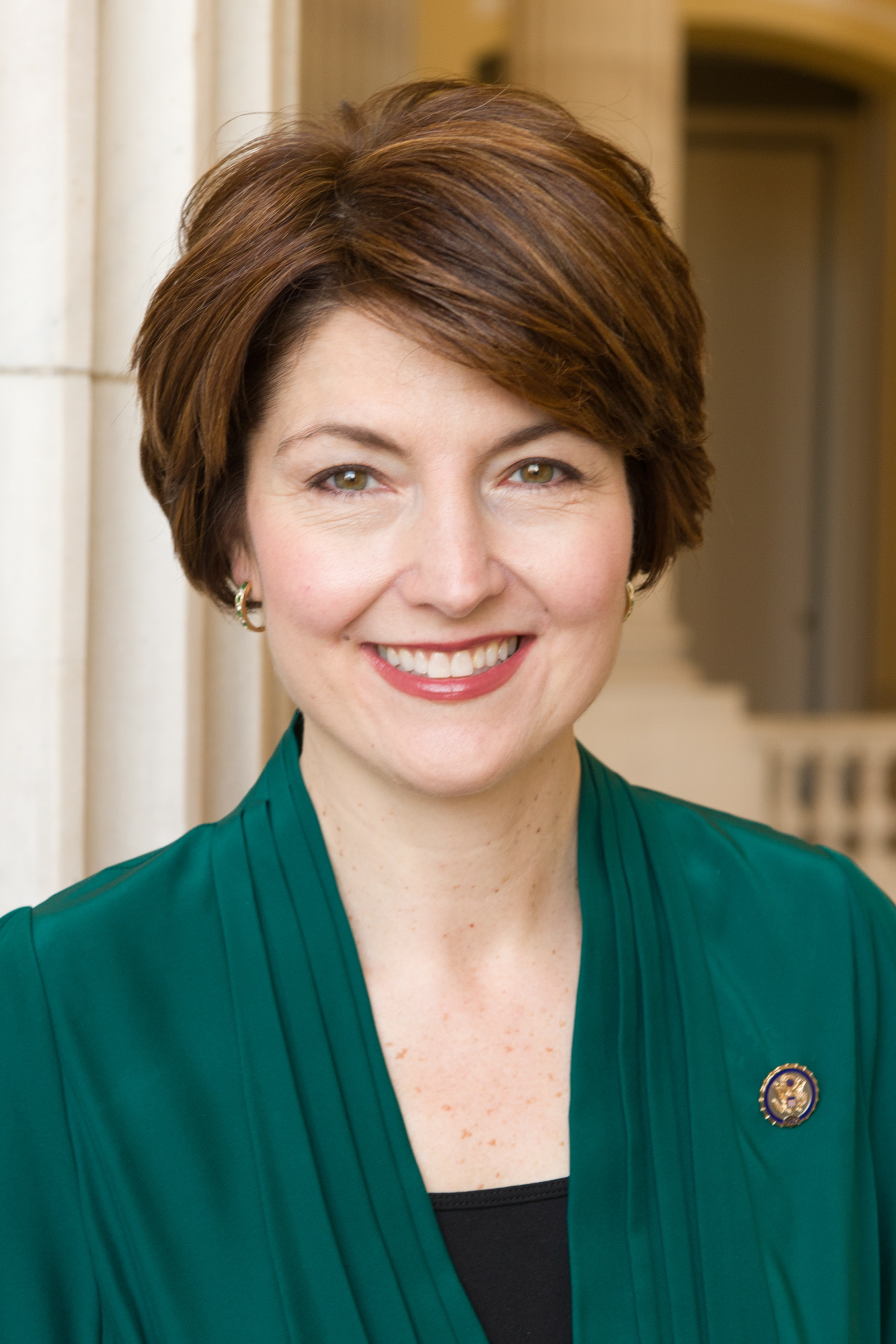

Nominee	Cathy McMorris Rodgers	Daryl Romeyn
Party	Republican	Democratic
Popular vote	177,235	101,146
Percentage	63.7%	36.3%
- County results Rodgers: 60–70% 70–80%
U.S. Representative before election
Cathy McMorris Rodgers
Republican
Elected U.S. Representative
Cathy McMorris Rodgers
Republican

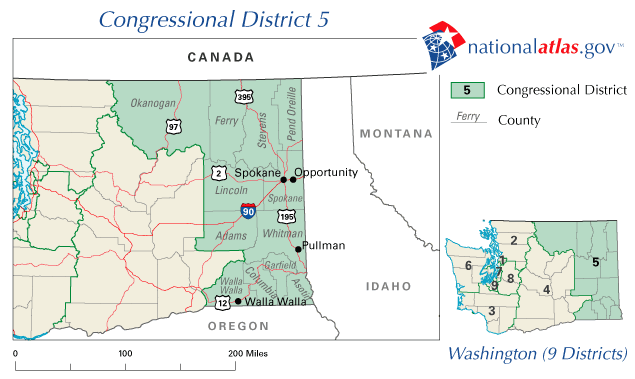
Washington's 5th congressional district in 2010

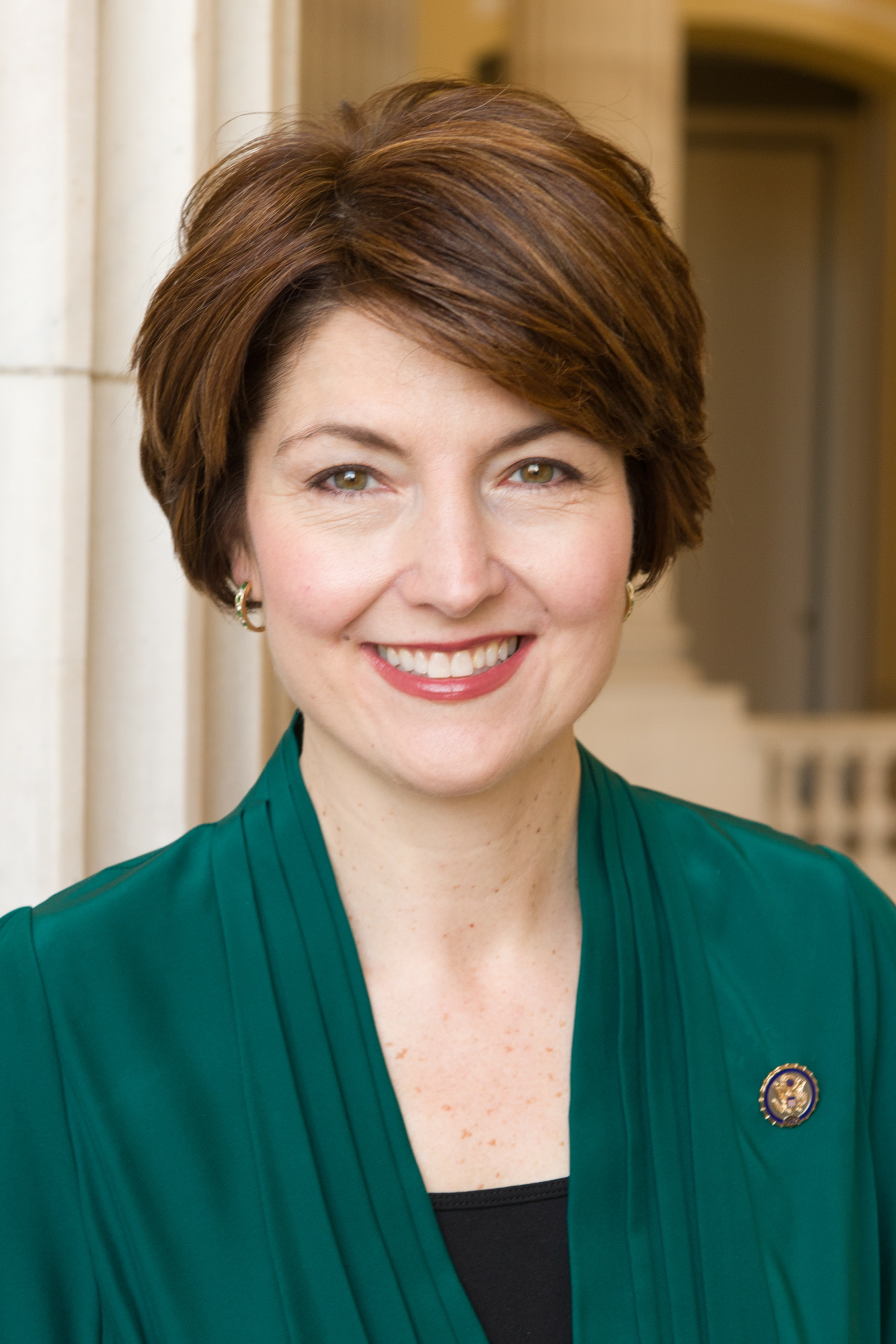
Cathy McMorris Rodgers, who was re-elected as the U.S. representative for the 5th district

The 5th district included Spokane, Spokane Valley and Walla Walla. The district's population was 86 percent white and 6 percent Hispanic (see Race and ethnicity in the United States census); 91 percent were high school graduates and 26 percent had received a bachelor's degree or higher. Its median income was $45,344. In the 2008 presidential election the district gave 52 percent of its vote to Republican nominee John McCain and 46 percent to Democratic nominee Barack Obama.

Republican Cathy McMorris Rodgers, who took office in 2005, was the incumbent. McMorris Rodgers was re-elected in 2008 with 65 percent of the vote. In 2010 McMorris Rodgers's opponent in the general election was Daryl Romeyn, a television presenter and a member of the Democratic Party. Clyde Cordero, a vice president of the American GI Forum; David R. Fox, a lawyer; and Barbara Lampert, a retired nurse's aide, also ran as Democrats. Randall Yearout, an operations engineer and business owner, ran as a Constitution Party candidate.

McMorris Rodgers raised $1,453,240 and spent $1,381,220. Romeyn raised $2,320 and spent $13,318. Cordero raised $18,397 and spent $15,525. Yearout raised $7,644 and spent $10,151.

Prior to the election FiveThirtyEight's forecast gave McMorris Rodgers a 100 percent chance of winning, and projected that she would receive 68 percent of the vote to Romeyn's 30 percent. On election day McMorris Rodgers was re-elected with 64 percent of the vote to Romeyn's 36 percent. McMorris Rodgers was again re-elected in 2012, when Romeyn was elected as a County Commissioner in Spokane County; and in 2014.

=== Primary results ===
Washington's 5th congressional district primary election, August 17, 2010
Party	Candidate	Votes	%
Republican	Cathy McMorris Rodgers (incumbent)	106,191	62.53
Democratic	Daryl Romeyn	21,091	12.42
Democratic	Barbara Lampert	15,538	9.15
Democratic	Clyde Cordero	10,787	6.35
Constitution	Randall Yearout	10,635	6.26
Democratic	David R. Fox	5,569	3.28
Total votes		169,811	100.00

==== Predictions ====
Source	Ranking	As of
The Cook Political Report	Safe R	November 1, 2010
Rothenberg	Safe R	November 1, 2010
Sabato's Crystal Ball	Safe R	November 1, 2010
RCP	Safe R	November 1, 2010
CQ Politics	Safe R	October 28, 2010
New York Times	Safe R	November 1, 2010
FiveThirtyEight	Safe R	November 1, 2010

=== General election results ===
2010 Washington's 5th congressional district election
Party	Candidate	Votes	%
Republican	Cathy McMorris Rodgers (incumbent)	177,235	63.67
Democratic	Daryl Romeyn	101,146	36.33
Total votes		278,381	100.00

==== By county ====
County results
County	Cathy McMorris Rodgers Republican		Daryl Romeyn Democratic		Margin		Total votes
County	#	%	#	%	#	%	Total votes
Adams (part)	1,608	78.59%	438	21.41%	1,170	57.18%	2,046
Asotin	5,665	67.15%	2,771	32.85%	2,894	34.31%	8,436
Columbia	1,689	79.86%	426	20.14%	1,263	59.72%	2,115
Ferry	2,183	68.13%	1,021	31.87%	1,162	36.27%	3,204
Garfield	904	77.13%	268	22.87%	636	54.27%	1,172
Lincoln	3,811	70.37%	1,605	29.63%	2,206	40.73%	5,416
Okanogan	9,865	67.34%	4,785	32.66%	5,080	34.68%	14,650
Pend Oreille	3,575	61.49%	2,239	38.51%	1,336	22.98%	5,814
Spokane	110,557	60.84%	71,146	39.16%	39,411	21.69%	181,703
Stevens	13,422	68.18%	6,263	31.82%	7,159	36.37%	19,685
Walla Walla	15,574	75.07%	5,172	24.93%	10,402	50.14%	20,746
Whitman	8,382	62.58%	5,012	37.42%	3,370	25.16%	13,394
Totals	177,235	63.67%	101,146	36.33%	76,089	27.33%	278,381

== District 6 ==
2010 Washington's 6th congressional district election
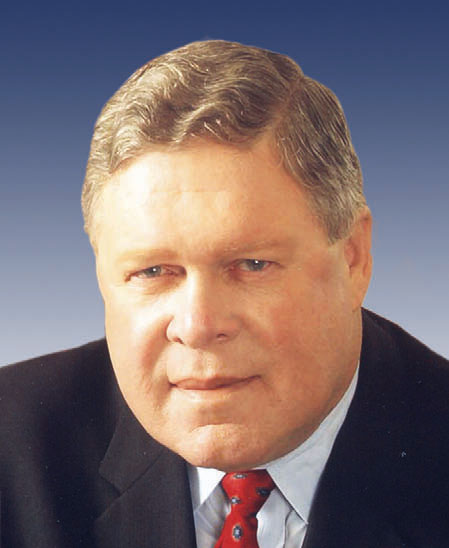

Nominee	Norm Dicks	Doug Cloud
Party	Democratic	Republican
Popular vote	151,873	109,800
Percentage	58.0%	42.0%
- County results Dicks: 50–60% 60–70% Cloud: 50–60%
U.S. Representative before election
Norm Dicks
Democratic
Elected U.S. Representative
Norm Dicks
Democratic

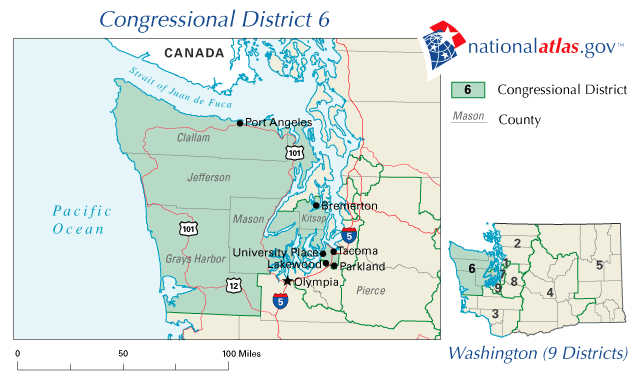
Washington's 6th congressional district in 2010

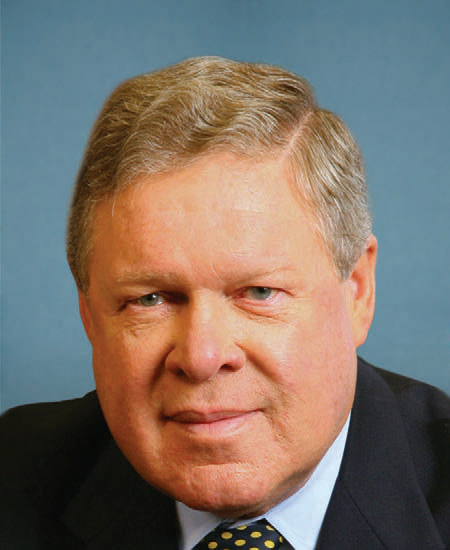
Norm Dicks, who was re-elected as the U.S. representative for the 6th district

The 6th district included Bremerton, University Place and parts of Lakewood, Parkland and Tacoma. The district's population was 76 percent white, 7 percent Hispanic, 5 percent black and 5 percent Asian (see Race and ethnicity in the United States census); 89 percent were high school graduates and 22 percent had received a bachelor's degree or higher. Its median income was $48,170. In the 2008 presidential election the district gave 57 percent of its vote to Democratic nominee Barack Obama and 40 percent to Republican nominee John McCain.

Democrat Norm Dicks, who took office in 1977, was the incumbent. Dicks was re-elected in 2008 with 67 percent of the vote. In 2010 Dicks's opponent in the general election was Doug Cloud, a lawyer and a member of the Republican Party. Jesse Young, a software engineer, also ran as a Republican.

Dicks raised $1,412,760 and spent $1,582,738. Cloud raised $118,128 and spent $116,474. Young raised $35,351 and spent $35,295. In an internal poll with a sample size of 1,262 likely voters, conducted by Wenzel Strategies for Cloud's campaign in October 2010, 609 respondents intended to vote for Cloud while 558 favored Dicks and 95 were unsure.

Prior to the election FiveThirtyEight's forecast gave Dicks a 97 percent chance of winning, and projected that he would receive 57 percent of the vote to Cloud's 43 percent. On election day Dicks was re-elected with 58 percent of the vote to Cloud's 42 percent. In 2012, Dicks retired rather than seeking re-election and was succeeded by Democrat Derek Kilmer, while Cloud ran for the seat again.

=== Primary results ===
Washington's 6th congressional district primary election, August 17, 2010
Party	Candidate	Votes	%
Democratic	Norm Dicks (incumbent)	90,596	56.63
Republican	Doug Cloud	45,959	28.73
Republican	Jesse Young	23,410	14.63
Total votes		159,965	100.00

=== General election ===
==== Polling ====
Poll source	Date(s) administered	Sample size	Margin of error	Norm Dicks (D)	Doug Cloud (R)	Undecided
Wenzel Strategies (R) (Note: Poll sponsored by Cloud's campaign)	October 18–19, 2010	1,262 (LV)	± 2.7%	44%	48%	8%

==== Predictions ====
Source	Ranking	As of
The Cook Political Report	Safe D	November 1, 2010
Rothenberg	Safe D	November 1, 2010
Sabato's Crystal Ball	Safe D	November 1, 2010
RCP	Safe D	November 1, 2010
CQ Politics	Safe D	October 28, 2010
New York Times	Safe D	November 1, 2010
FiveThirtyEight	Safe D	November 1, 2010

==== Results ====
2010 Washington's 6th congressional district election
Party	Candidate	Votes	%
Democratic	Norm Dicks (incumbent)	151,873	58.04
Republican	Doug Cloud	109,800	41.96
Total votes		261,673	100.00

==== By county ====
County results
County	Norm Dicks Democratic		Doug Cloud Republican		Margin		Total votes
County	#	%	#	%	#	%	Total votes
Clallam	15,546	46.71%	17,733	53.29%	-2,187	-6.57%	33,279
Grays Harbor	13,931	55.36%	11,233	44.64%	2,698	10.72%	25,164
Jefferson	11,156	64.79%	6,062	35.21%	5,094	29.59%	17,218
Kitsap (part)	28,643	58.83%	20,047	41.17%	8,596	17.65%	48,690
Mason	13,330	54.07%	11,322	45.93%	2,008	8.15%	24,652
Pierce (part)	69,267	61.48%	43,403	38.52%	25,864	22.96%	112,670
Totals	151,873	58.04%	109,800	41.96%	42,073	16.08%	261,673

== District 7 ==
2010 Washington's 7th congressional district election
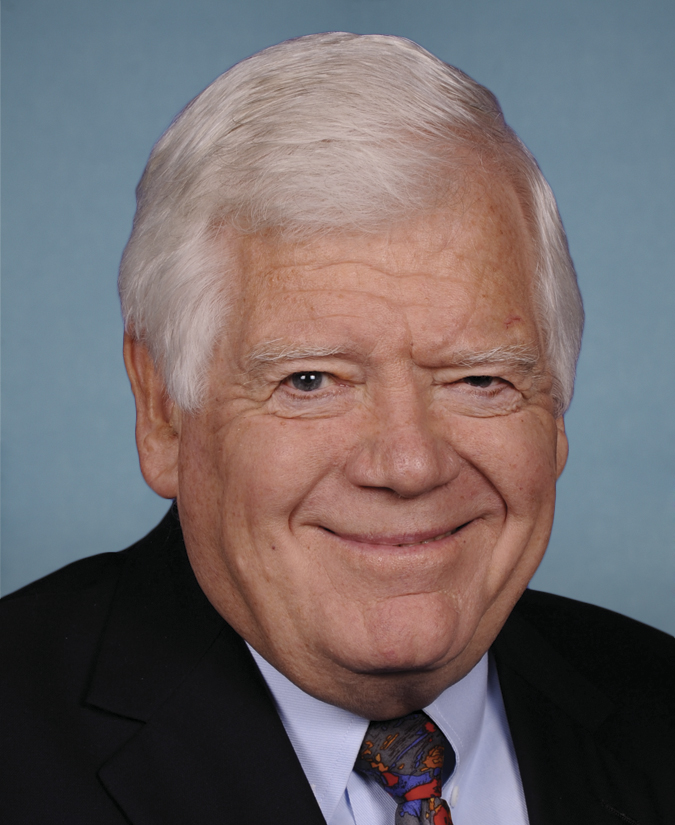

Nominee	Jim McDermott	Bob Jeffers-Schroder
Party	Democratic	Independent
Popular vote	232,649	47,741
Percentage	83.0%	17.0%
- County results Mcdermott: 80–90%
U.S. Representative before election
Jim McDermott
Democratic
Elected U.S. Representative
Jim McDermott
Democratic

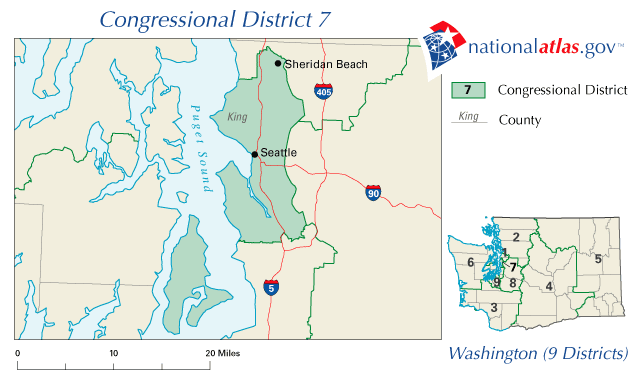
Washington's 7th congressional district in 2010

The 7th district included parts of Seattle and Shoreline. The district's population was 67 percent white, 13 percent Asian, 8 percent black and 7 percent Hispanic (see Race and ethnicity in the United States census); 91 percent were high school graduates and 50 percent had received a bachelor's degree or higher. Its median income was $60,620. In the 2008 presidential election the district gave 83 percent of its vote to Democratic nominee Barack Obama and 15 percent to Republican nominee John McCain.

Democrat Jim McDermott, who took office in 1989, was the incumbent. McDermott was re-elected in 2008 with 84 percent of the vote. In 2012 McDermott's opponent in the general election was Bob Jeffers-Schroder, a member of Citizens' Climate Lobby who ran as an independent candidate. Bill Hoffman, a screenwriter and film producer; Don Rivers, an advisor to elected officials; and Scott Sizemore, the leader of the Seattle Youth and Beauty Brigade, also ran as Democrats. S. Sutherland, a renewable energy researcher, also ran as an independent candidate.

McDermott raised $582,232 and spent $568,649. Hoffman raised $14,856 and spent $14,843. Rivers raised $4,698 and spent $9,623.

Prior to the election FiveThirtyEight gave McDermott a 100 percent chance of winning. On election day McDermott received 83 percent of the vote to Jeffers-Schroder's 17 percent. McDermott was again re-elected in 2012 and in 2014.

=== Primary results ===
Washington's 7th congressional district primary election, August 17, 2010
Party	Candidate	Votes	%
Democratic	Jim McDermott (incumbent)	110,914	79.85
Independent	Bob Jeffers-Schroder	8,860	6.38
Democratic	Bill Hoffman	6,135	4.42
Independent	S. Sutherland	4,999	3.60
Democratic	Don Rivers	4,781	3.44
Democratic	Scott Sizemore	3,220	2.32
Total votes		138,909	100.00

==== Predictions ====
Source	Ranking	As of
The Cook Political Report	Safe D	November 1, 2010
Rothenberg	Safe D	November 1, 2010
Sabato's Crystal Ball	Safe D	November 1, 2010
RCP	Safe D	November 1, 2010
CQ Politics	Safe D	October 28, 2010
New York Times	Safe D	November 1, 2010
FiveThirtyEight	Safe D	November 1, 2010

=== General election results ===
2010 Washington's 7th congressional district election
Party	Candidate	Votes	%
Democratic	Jim McDermott (incumbent)	232,649	82.97
Independent	Bob Jeffers-Schroder	47,741	17.03
Total votes		280,390	100.00

==== By county ====
County results
County	Jim McDermott Democratic		Bob Jeffers-Schroder Independent		Margin		Total votes
County	#	%	#	%	#	%	Total votes
King (part)	232,649	82.97%	47,741	17.03%	184,908	65.95%	280,390
Totals	232,649	82.97%	47,741	17.03%	184,908	65.95%	280,390

== District 8 ==
2010 Washington's 8th congressional district election
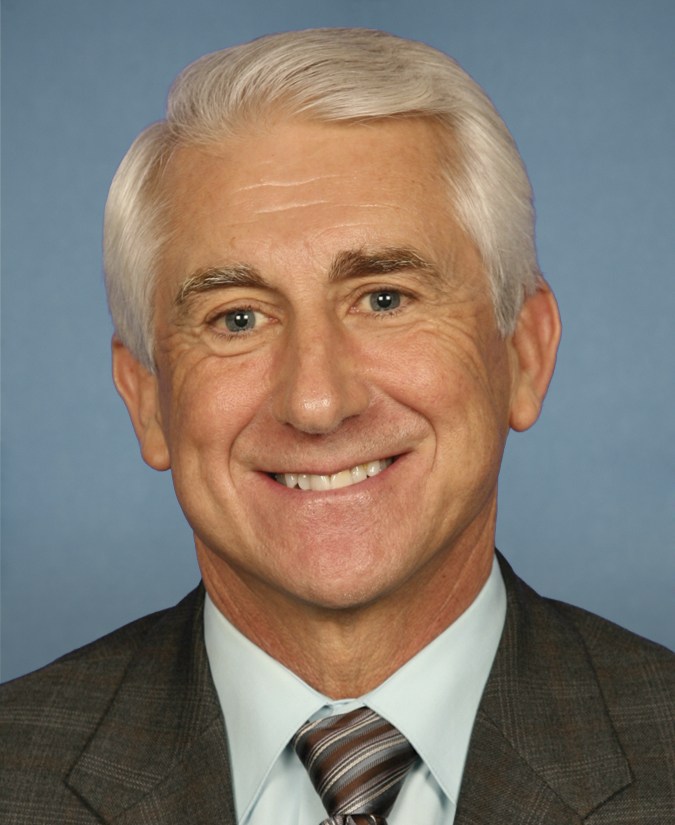

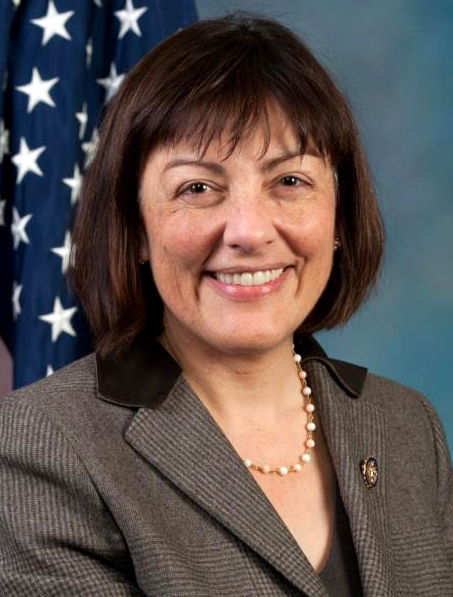
Nominee	Dave Reichert	Suzan DelBene
Party	Republican	Democratic
Popular vote	161,296	148,581
Percentage	52.0%	48.0%
- County results Reichert: 50–60%
U.S. Representative before election
Dave Reichert
Republican
Elected U.S. Representative
Dave Reichert
Republican

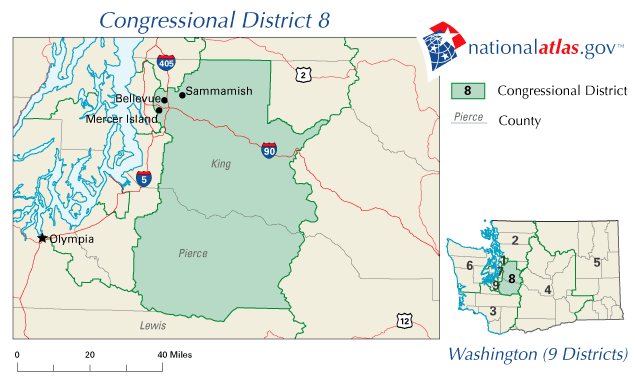
Washington's 8th congressional district

The 8th district included Bellevue, Sammamish, and parts of Auburn, Kent, Renton and South Hill. The district's population was 76 percent white, 11 percent Asian and 6 percent Hispanic (see Race and ethnicity in the United States census); 93 percent were high school graduates and 41 percent had received a bachelor's degree or higher. Its median income was $82,403. In the 2008 presidential election the district gave 56 percent of its vote to Democratic nominee Barack Obama and 42 percent to Republican nominee John McCain.

Republican Dave Reichert, who took office in 2005, was the incumbent. Reichert was re-elected in 2008 with 53 percent of the vote. In 2010 his opponent in the general election was Suzan DelBene, a businesswoman who ran as a Democrat. Keith Arnold, an accounting technician for the federal government; Tom Cramer, a small business owner; and Boleslaw (John) Olinski, a social worker with the Washington Department of Social and Health Services, also ran as Democrats. Tim Dillon, a member of the Yarrow Point town council; and Ernest Huber, a retired lieutenant commander in the United States Navy, also ran as Republicans. Robin Adair, who ran for the U.S. Senate in 2006; and Caleb Love Mardini, a marketing and business consultant, ran as independent candidates.

Reichert raised $2,793,788 and spent $2,770,293. DelBene raised $4,024,786 and spent $3,942,493. Cramer raised $72,140 and spent $72,132. Mardini raised $3,156 and spent $1,813.

In a poll of 657 likely voters conducted by SurveyUSA in August and September 2010, 54 percent of respondents supported Reichert while 41 percent favored DelBene and 5 percent were undecided. In a SurveyUSA poll of 579 likely voters conducted later in September 2010, Reichert led with 52 percent to DelBene's 45 percent with 4 percent undecided. An internal poll by Fairbank, Maslin, Maullin, Metz & Associates for DelBene's campaign, conducted on October 4 and 5, 2010, with a sample size of 400 likely voters, found Reichert leading with 48 percent to DelBene's 44 percent, while 8 percent chose "undecided/other". A poll of 1,036 likely voters by Public Policy Polling for Daily Kos, conducted on October 9 and 10, 2010, found Reichert leading with 49 percent to DelBene's 46 percent, and 5 percent undecided. In a SurveyUSA poll of 639 likely and actual voters conducted between October 18 and 20, 2010, 52 percent supported Reichert, 45 percent supported DelBene, and 3 percent were undecided.

On election day Reichert was re-elected with 52 percent of the vote to DelBene's 48 percent. Reichert was again re-elected in 2012, when DelBene was elected to represent the 1st district; and in 2014.

=== Primary results ===
Washington's 8th congressional district primary election, August 17, 2010
Party	Candidate	Votes	%
Republican	Dave Reichert (incumbent)	76,118	47.23
Democratic	Suzan DelBene	43,272	26.85
Democratic	Tom Cramer	15,313	9.50
Republican	Ernest Huber	9,376	5.82
Republican	Tim Dillon	8,291	5.14
Democratic	Keith Arnold	3,405	2.11
Independent	Robin Adair	2,648	1.64
Democratic	Boleslaw (John) Orlinski	1,761	1.09
Independent	Caleb Love Mardini	987	0.61
Total votes		161,171	100.00

=== General election ===
==== Polling ====
Poll source	Date(s) administered	Sample size	Margin of error	Dave Reichert (R)	Suzan DelBene (D)	Undecided
SurveyUSA	October 18–20, 2010	639 (LV)	± 4%	52%	45%	3%
Public Policy Polling (D)	October 9–10, 2010	1,036 (LV)	–	49%	46%	5%
Fairbank Maslin (D) (Note: Poll sponsored by DelBene's campaign)	October 4–5, 2010	400 (LV)	–	48%	44%	8%
SurveyUSA	September 27–29, 2010	579 (LV)	± 4.2%	52%	45%	4%
SurveyUSA	August 31 – September 2, 2010	657 (LV)	± 3.9%	54%	41%	5%

==== Predictions ====
Source	Ranking	As of
The Cook Political Report	Likely R	November 1, 2010
Rothenberg	Likely R	November 1, 2010
Sabato's Crystal Ball	Lean R	November 1, 2010
RCP	Lean R	November 1, 2010
CQ Politics	Lean R	October 28, 2010
New York Times	Lean R	November 1, 2010
FiveThirtyEight	Likely R	November 1, 2010

==== Results ====
2010 Washington's 8th congressional district election
Party	Candidate	Votes	%
Republican	Dave Reichert (incumbent)	161,296	52.05
Democratic	Suzan DelBene	148,581	47.95
Total votes		309,877	100.00

==== By county ====
County results
County	Dave Reichert Republican		Suzan DelBene Democratic		Margin		Total votes
County	#	%	#	%	#	%	Total votes
King (part)	123,879	50.17%	123,052	49.83%	827	0.33%	246,931
Pierce (part)	37,417	59.44%	25,529	40.56%	11,888	18.89%	62,946
Totals	161,296	52.05%	148,581	47.95%	12,715	4.10%	309,877

== District 9 ==
2010 Washington's 9th congressional district election
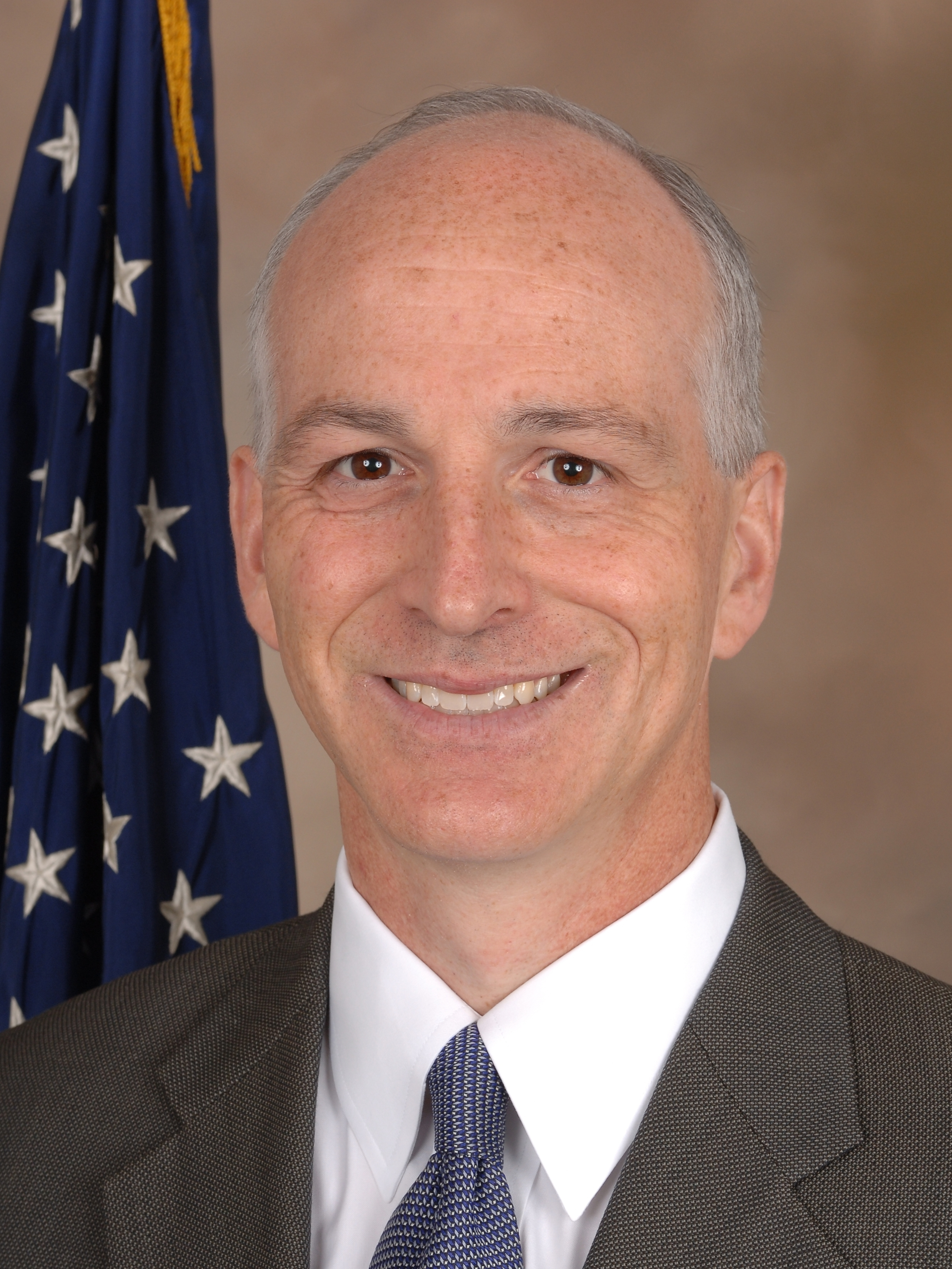

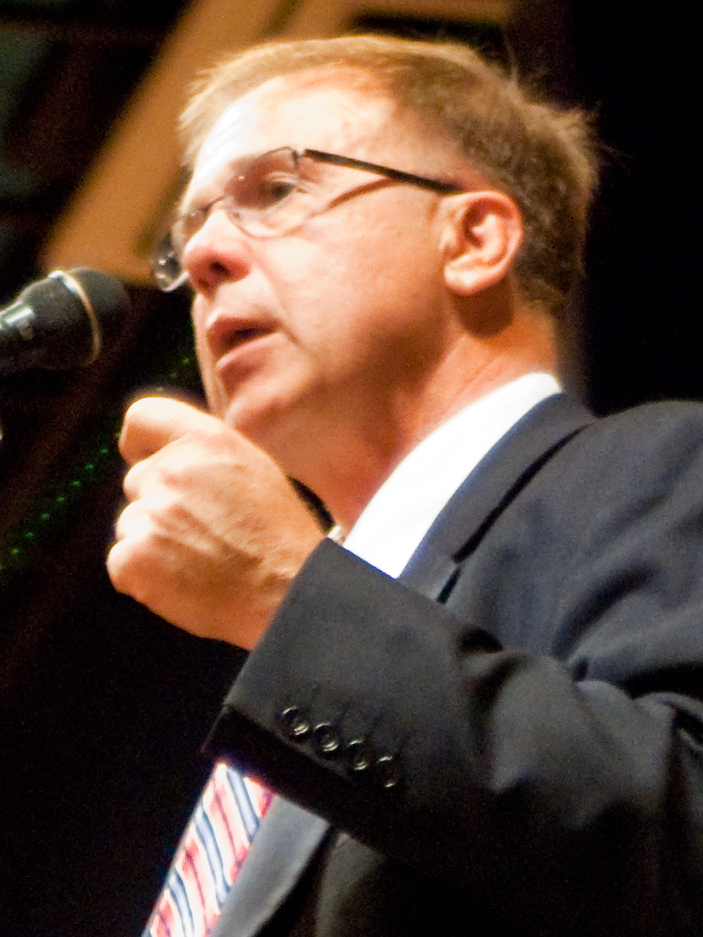
Nominee	Adam Smith	Dick Muri
Party	Democratic	Republican
Popular vote	123,743	101,851
Percentage	54.9%	45.1%
U.S. Representative before election
Adam Smith
Democratic
Elected U.S. Representative
Adam Smith
Democratic

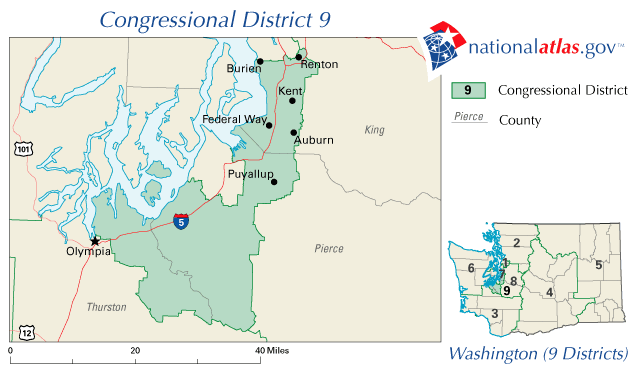
Washington's 9th congressional district in 2010

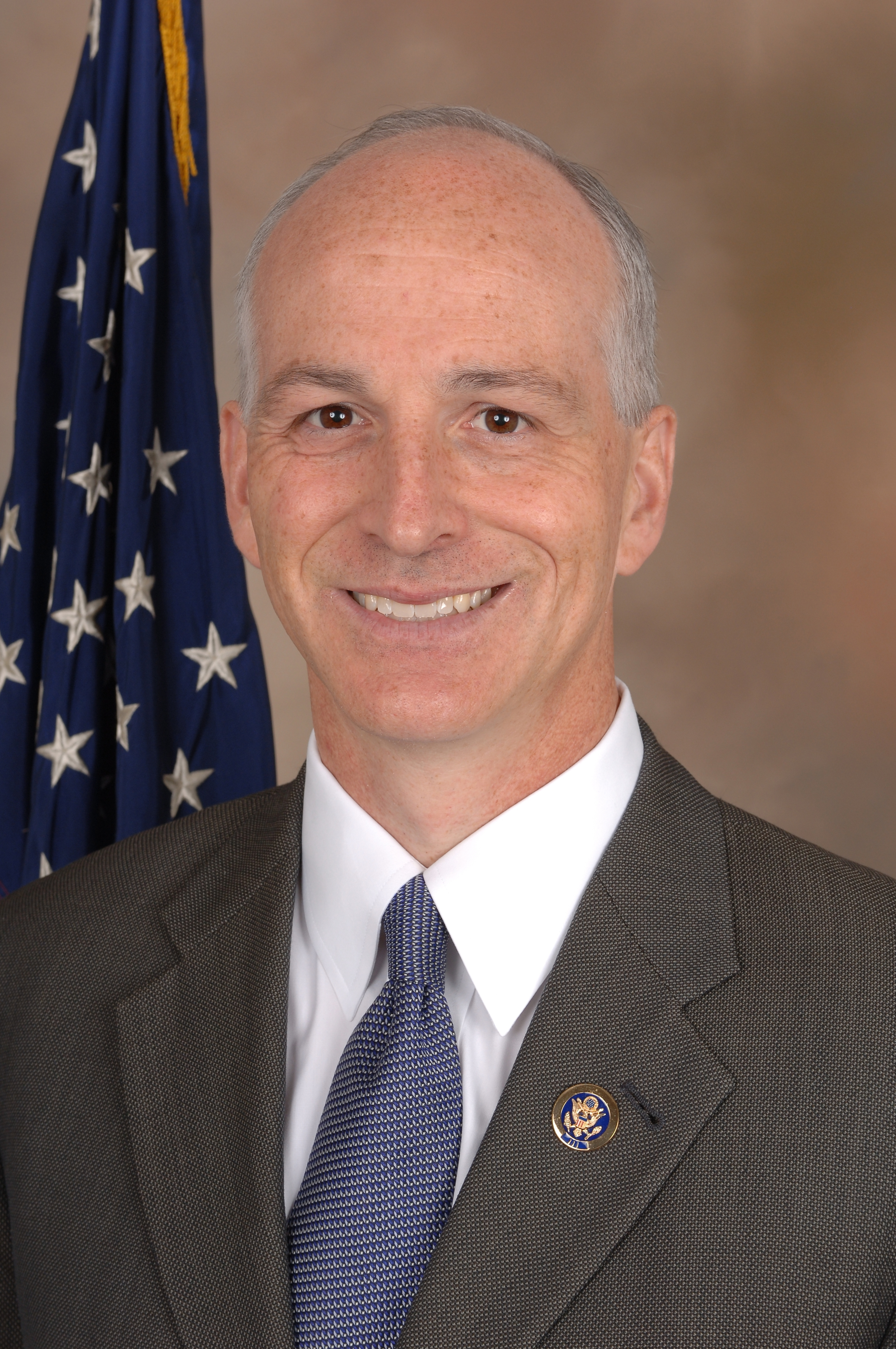
Adam Smith, who was re-elected as the U.S. representative for the 9th district

The 9th district included Federal Way and parts of Kent, Lacey, Lakewood, Puyallup and Renton. The district's population was 68 percent white, 10 percent Hispanic, 9 percent Asian and 7 percent black (see Race and ethnicity in the United States census); 89 percent were high school graduates and 23 percent had received a bachelor's degree or higher. Its median income was $56,522. In the 2008 presidential election the district gave 58 percent of its vote to Democratic nominee Barack Obama and 40 percent to Republican nominee John McCain.

The incumbent was Democrat Adam Smith, who took office in 1997. Smith was re-elected in 2008 with 65 percent of the vote. In 2010 his opponent in the general election was Republican Dick Muri, a member of the Pierce County Council. Jim Postma, a retired engineer and rocket scientist, also ran as a Republican; and Roy Olson, a government actuary, ran as a Green Party candidate. Tom Campbell, a member of the Washington House of Representatives, had planned to seek the Republican nomination but ended his campaign in September 2009.

Smith raised $948,533 and spent $1,355,512. Muri raised $240,210 and spent the same amount. Postma raised $168,744 and spent $114,057. Olson raised $1,941 and spent the same amount.

In a poll of 586 likely voters conducted by SurveyUSA in September 2010, 49 percent of respondents intended to vote for Smith while 46 percent supported Muri and 5 percent were undecided. A poll of 400 likely voters, conducted later that month by the Benenson Strategy Group for Smith's campaign, found Smith leading with 54 percent to Muri's 35 percent, and 11 percent unsure. Another SurveyUSA poll, conducted in October 2010 with a sample size of 590 likely and actual voters, found Smith again leading with 49 percent to Muri's 46 percent, and 5 percent undecided.

=== Primary results ===
Washington's 9th congressional district primary election, August 17, 2010
Party	Candidate	Votes	%
Democratic	Adam Smith (incumbent)	63,866	51.24
Republican	Dick Muri	32,116	25.76
Republican	Jim Postma	24,509	19.66
Green	Roy Olson	4,159	3.34
Total votes		124,650	100.00

=== General election ===
==== Polling ====
Poll source	Date(s) administered	Sample size	Margin of error	Adam Smith (D)	Dick Muri (R)	Undecided
SurveyUSA	October 22–25, 2010	590 (LV)	± 4.1%	49%	46%	5%
Benenson (D) (Note: Poll sponsored by Smith's campaign)	September 18–20, 2010	400 (LV)	± 4.9%	54%	35%	11%
SurveyUSA	September 14–16, 2010	586 (LV)	± 4.1%	49%	46%	5%

==== Predictions ====
Source	Ranking	As of
The Cook Political Report	Likely D	November 1, 2010
Rothenberg	Safe D	November 1, 2010
Sabato's Crystal Ball	Safe D	November 1, 2010
RCP	Tossup	November 1, 2010
CQ Politics	Safe D	October 28, 2010
New York Times	Safe D	November 1, 2010
FiveThirtyEight	Likely D	November 1, 2010

==== Results ====
2010 Washington's 9th congressional district election
Party	Candidate	Votes	%
Democratic	Adam Smith (incumbent)	123,743	54.85
Republican	Dick Muri	101,851	45.15
Total votes		225,594	100.00

==== By county ====
County results
County	Adam Smith Democratic		Dick Muri Republican		Margin		Total votes
County	#	%	#	%	#	%	Total votes
King (part)	59,201	59.82%	39,757	40.18%	19,444	19.65%	98,958
Pierce (part)	41,559	48.80%	43,603	51.20%	-2,044	-2.40%	85,162
Thurston (part)	22,983	55.42%	18,491	44.58%	4,492	10.83%	41,474
Totals	123,743	54.85%	101,851	45.15%	21,892	9.70%	225,594

== See also ==
- List of United States representatives from Washington
- Washington's congressional delegations

== Notes ==
Partisan clients
