= Monica Stonier =

American educator and politician

Member of the Washington House of Representatives from the 49th district
- Incumbent
- Assumed office January 9, 2017 Serving with Sharon Wylie
- Preceded by: Jim Moeller

Member of the Washington House of Representatives from the 17th district
- In office January 13, 2013 – January 12, 2015
- Preceded by: Tim Probst
- Succeeded by: Lynda Wilson

Personal details
- Born: Monica Michelle Jurado; October 5, 1976 (age 49) Edwards, California
- Party: Democratic
- Education: Western Washington University, Washington State University Vancouver
- Occupation: Educator, politician
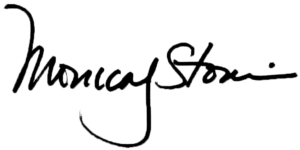
- Signature

Monica Michelle Jurado Stonier (born October 5, 1976) is an American educator and politician serving as a member of the Washington House of Representatives, representing the 49th district since 2017. A member of the Democratic Party, she previously served one term representing the 17th district.

Stonier was born to a Japanese American mother and Mexican American father, and works as a middle school teacher and instructional coach.
