= Shirley Galloway =

American politician from Washington

Member of the Washington Senate from the 17th district
- In office August 6, 1996 – January 13, 1997
- Preceded by: Dean Sutherland
- Succeeded by: Don Benton

Member of the Washington House of Representatives from the 49th district
- In office January 8, 1979 – January 14, 1985
- Preceded by: John McKibbin
- Succeeded by: Busse Nutley

Personal details
- Born: August 20, 1934 (age 91) Postelle, Arkansas
- Party: Democratic

Shirley Galloway (born August 20, 1934) is an American politician who served in the Washington House of Representatives from the 49th district from 1979 to 1985 and in the Washington State Senate from the 17th district from 1996 to 1997.
