= Senator Sutherland =

Senator Sutherland may refer to:

== Members of the United States Senate ==
- George Sutherland (1862–1942), U.S. Senator from Utah from 1905 to 1917
- Howard Sutherland (1865–1950), U.S. Senator from West Virginia from 1917 to 1923

== U.S. state and territorial senate members ==
- Daniel Sutherland (1869–1955), Alaska Territorial Senate
- Dean Sutherland (born 1954), Washington State Senate
- Edmund G. Sutherland (1815–1883), New York State Senate
- George Eaton Sutherland (1843–1899), Wisconsin State Senate
- James Sutherland (Wisconsin politician) (1820–1905), Wisconsin State Senate
- Joel Barlow Sutherland (1792–1861), Pennsylvania State Senate
- Kenneth F. Sutherland (1888–1954), New York State Senate
- Solomon Sutherland (1762–1802), New York State Senate
