= Brendan Williams =

Brendan Williams may refer to:

- Brendan Williams (politician) (born 1968), American politician in Washington State
- Brendan Williams (rugby union) (born 1978), Australian rugby union footballer
