= Holly Myers =

American politician

Member of the Washington House of Representatives from the 17th district
- In office January 9, 1989 – January 9, 1995
- Preceded by: Dean Sutherland
- Succeeded by: Don Benton

Personal details
- Born: May 27, 1955 (age 71) Portland, Oregon, U.S.
- Party: Democratic

Holly Myers (born May 27, 1955) is an American politician who served in the Washington House of Representatives from the 17th district from 1989 to 1995.
