= Sandra Romero =

American politician (born 1948)

Member of the Washington House of Representatives from the 22nd district
- In office January 11, 1993 – January 10, 2005
- Preceded by: Karen Fraser
- Succeeded by: Brendan Williams

Personal details
- Born: May 24, 1948 (age 78) Louisville, Kentucky
- Party: Democratic

Sandra Romero (born May 24, 1948) is an American politician who served in the Washington House of Representatives from the 22nd district from 1993 to 2005.
