= Senator Benton =

Senator Benton may refer to:

== Members of the United States Senate ==
- Thomas Hart Benton (politician) (1782–1858), U.S. Senator from Missouri from 1821 to 1851
- William Benton (politician) (1900–1973), U.S. Senator from Connecticut from 1949 to 1953

== United States state senate members ==
- Don Benton (born 1957), Washington State Senate
- Nathaniel S. Benton (1792–1869), New York State Senate
