= Vicki Kraft =

American politician (born 1969)

Member of the Washington House of Representatives from the 17th district
- In office January 9, 2017 – January 9, 2023
- Preceded by: Lynda Wilson
- Succeeded by: Kevin Waters

Personal details
- Born: Vicki Lynne Caldwell; 1969 (age 56–57)
- Party: Republican
- Education: Michigan State University (BA)
- Website: Official website

Vicki Lynne Caldwell Kraft (born 1969) is an American politician who served as a member of the Washington State House of Representatives for the 17th legislative district from 2017 until 2023. She was reelected in 2018, defeating Democrat Tanisha Harris by a margin of victory of less than 2%. In a 2020 rematch, Kraft beat Harris by approximately 2.2%.

== Early life and education ==
Kraft was raised in Michigan and graduated from Michigan State University with a Bachelor of Arts degree in advertising.

== Career ==
Prior to entering politics, Kraft worked as an account executive for Dell, Pillsbury, and Frigidaire.

Kraft has promoted false claims of election fraud about the 2020 elections. In the summer of 2021, Kraft was one of three Washington legislators who visited South Dakota to attend a symposium organized by My Pillow CEO Mike Lindell, known for promoting false claims of fraud about the 2020 presidential election. She and the two legislators who attended the event used reimbursed funds from the state legislature's annual travel allotment for events "connected to their legislative work".

In August 2021, Kraft and four other state Republican lawmakers held an unofficial hearing with the aim of possibly calling for a "forensic audit" to take place in Washington State similar to the 2021 Maricopa County presidential ballot audit. The group that organized the event invited a speaker who falsely claimed there was voter fraud in the 2020 presidential election. The same month, Kraft wrote to Secretary of State Kim Wyman calling for a "forensic audit" of Washington's 2020 elections, saying that there were "many questions and issues to be addressed regarding our November 2020 elections."

In November 2021, Kraft and 2 other Washington state Republican lawmakers signed a letter calling the 2020 election "corrupted" and demanded that an audit similar to the 2021 Maricopa County presidential ballot audit be conducted in all states. The letter also requested the decertification of state electors from 2020 and inaccurately claimed that the Maricopa audit found evidence of fraud.

After the state's redistricting of Washington's legislative map, Kraft's district was drawn out. In December 2021, Kraft announced her intention to run against Rep. Jaime Herrera Beutler.

== Personal life ==
In 2007, Kraft moved to Washington. She lives in Vancouver, Washington, with her husband.
