= Don Benton =

American politician (born 1957)

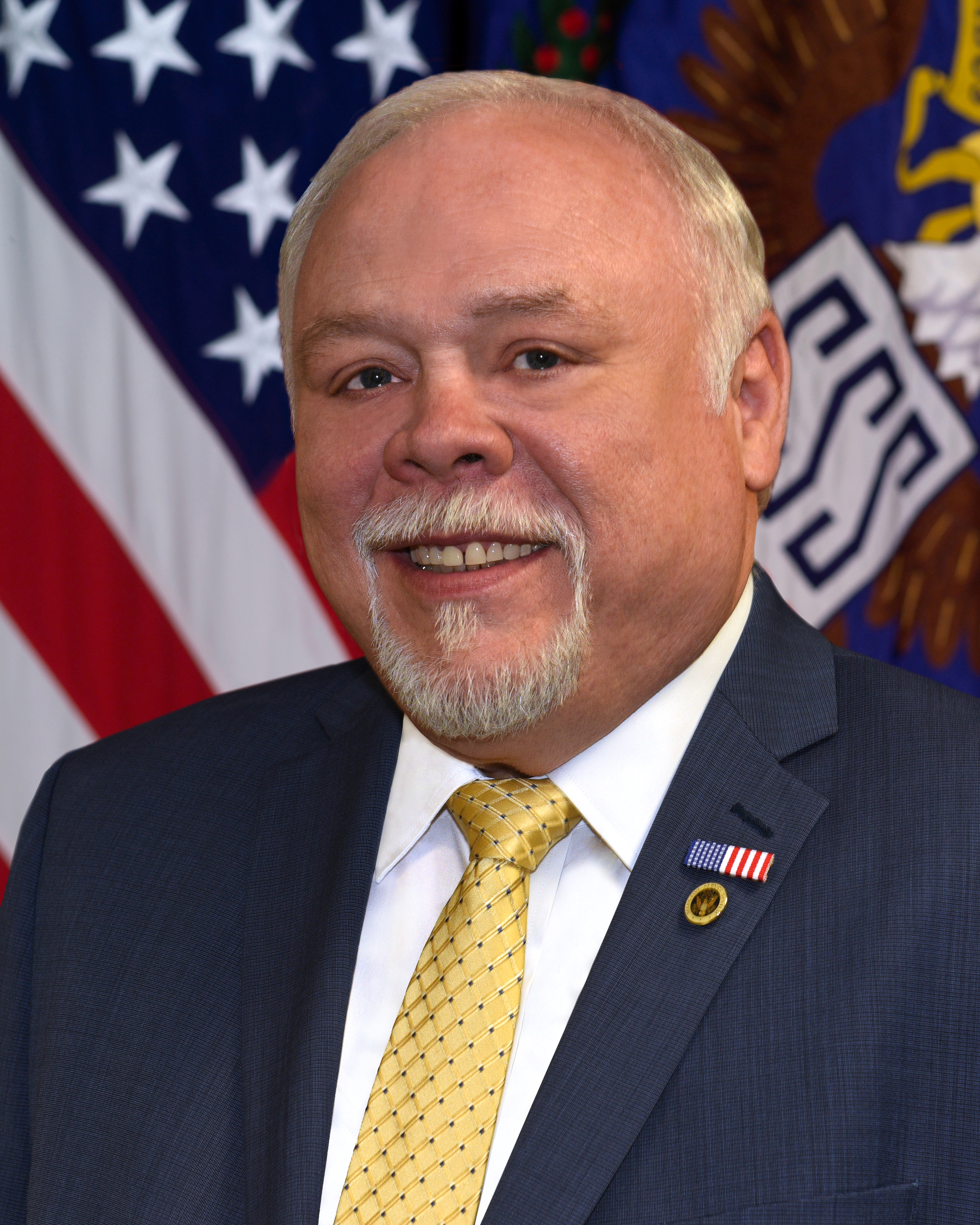

13th Director of the Selective Service System
- In office April 13, 2017 – January 20, 2021
- President: Donald Trump
- Preceded by: Lawrence Romo; Adam J. Copp (acting)
- Succeeded by: Craig T. Brown (acting)

Member of the Washington Senate from the 17th district
- In office December 14, 1996 – January 9, 2017
- Preceded by: Shirley Galloway
- Succeeded by: Lynda Wilson

Member of the Washington House of Representatives from the 17th district
- In office January 9, 1995 – December 14, 1996
- Preceded by: Holly Myers
- Succeeded by: Jim Dunn

Chair of the Washington Republican Party
- In office January 1, 2000 – March 14, 2001
- Preceded by: Dale Foreman
- Succeeded by: Chris Vance

Personal details
- Born: Donald Mark Benton; April 8, 1957 (age 69) Los Angeles, California, U.S.
- Party: Republican
- Children: 4, including Brad
- Education: Concordia University (BS)

Donald Mark Benton (born April 8, 1957) is an American politician. Originally from Santa Clarita, California, he served as a member of the Washington House of Representatives from 1995 to 1996 and the Washington State Senate from 1996 to 2017, representing Washington's 17th legislative district. He served as campaign director for Donald Trump in Washington. In 2016, after Trump was elected, Benton was appointed as a senior White House advisor at the Environmental Protection Agency for a few weeks, but reportedly did not work well with newly appointed agency head Scott Pruitt. In April 2017, Benton was named by President Trump as the 13th Director of the Selective Service System. He served in that position until the inauguration of President Biden.

== Early life and education ==
Benton received an A.A. from College of the Canyons and a B.S. from Concordia University. At age 19, he co-founded, with his sister, Santa Clarita Temporaries, a temporary employment agency. He later was employed as a district manager for Farmers Insurance Group and worked as an advertising consultant in Southwest Washington.

Benton served in the United States Army from December 1975 to February 1976, to be trained for a specific job skill under the Guaranteed Training Enlistment Program. When his training was no longer available, Benton quit the military, receiving an honorable discharge.

== Career ==
=== Washington State legislature ===
Benton was first elected to public office when he won a seat in the Washington state House of Representatives in 1994. In 1996, he won simultaneous special and general elections to the state Senate, and was re-elected four times. In 2012, Benton faced a tight and contentious race, edging Democratic challenger Tim Probst by less than 100 votes. Political scientist James Thurber described Benton as a "shoot from the hip" lawmaker known for a "bombastic" style and a frequent unwillingness to compromise. In the 2012 legislative session, Benton led senate Republicans in introducing a rare procedural motion known as the "ninth order" to push the Republican caucus's budget proposal to a floor vote. The "ninth order" allows any bill to be brought to a vote even if it has not had a public hearing. Democratic lawmakers protested that the maneuver lacked transparency, though three Democratic senators ultimately joined with Benton to help pass the motion. In 2014, Benton and Ann Rivers, another state legislator from Clark County, were admonished by a Senate committee for verbal sparring in which Rivers called Benton a "piece of shit," and Benton responded by referring to Rivers as a "trashy trampy-mouthed little girl." The same year, Benton, along with fellow GOP senator Pam Roach, requested his name be removed from the Republican caucus website. While Benton said he would remain a member of the Republican caucus, he no longer wanted to be publicly associated with it due to the caucus's decision to bring a bill granting illegal immigrants in-state tuition at state colleges to a floor vote.

Benton served on the Transportation, Government Operations, Rules, and Financial Institutions committees. He is a Washington state leader for the American Legislative Exchange Council (ALEC).

=== Washington State Republican Party Chair ===
In 2000, Benton was elected chair of the Washington state Republican Party. His tenure was marked by historical fundraising numbers, though some party members criticized his spending priorities and hiring decisions. After Benton used specific funds he raised to purchase a new headquarters in Olympia without consulting some party leadership, two members of the party's executive board requested his resignation, which he refused to give. The following year Benton lost reelection by three votes.

=== Clark County Director of Environmental Services ===
In 2013 Benton, while still serving in the Senate, was selected as director of environmental services for Clark County. His appointment was controversial as it bypassed standard civil service hiring procedures and Benton had no previous experience in environmental services. Editorials in The Columbian, The Olympian, and The Seattle Times questioned Benton's qualifications and the county was sued for unfair hiring practices by the department's interim director, who claimed she had been denied the opportunity to apply for the position. By November of that year Benton threatened a suit. His attorney contacted Ed Barnes, a Clark County union activist who had declared Benton unqualified for the job, during public comment periods at county commission meetings claiming defamation, though some legal experts questioned whether Benton, as a public figure, could file such a suit. In the midst of the matter, county commissioner David Madore, who had voted for Benton's appointment, declared the hiring was an "accident." The following year, Clark County convened a council of freeholders to rewrite the county's charter. Benton's position with Clark County was eliminated when the Department of Environmental Services was dissolved in July 2016. After the implementation of the county charter, hiring and firing decisions for department heads were shifted to the executive county manager. Benton filed a tort claim, a state requirement before filing suit against the county, in October 2016, seeking two million dollars from Clark County for wrongful termination.

=== Director of the Selective Service System ===
Benton served as campaign director for Donald Trump in Washington state during the 2016 Presidential election. Benton was initially the leader of the EPA "Beachhead" team, which oversaw the transition within the EPA from the Obama Administration to the Trump Administration. However, his approach to implementing the President's policies clashed with incoming EPA Director Scott Pruitt. On April 14, 2017, Trump named Benton as the 13th Director of the Selective Service System, responsible for the United States draft. Benton drew criticism when he reportedly suggested changes to the dress code at the Selective Service System that called for women to wear "conservative tops", pantyhose, and closed-toed shoes while telling men to wear dress shoes with sport coats or a suit and tie. Benton left the position of Director of the Selective Service System on January 20, 2021, the day President Biden was inaugurated. Benton was succeeded by an Acting Director pending President Biden's nomination of a new permanent Director.

== Political positions ==
=== Abortion ===
In 2013, Benton introduced a bill that would require parents to be notified if their minor daughter was having an abortion. Benton stated that "this is a parental rights bill" and not intended to stop abortions. "While minors must have parental permission to get a tattoo or have their ear pierced it is still possible for a young girl to have an abortion without the benefit of their own mother's counseling" said Benton. In a 2012 survey collected by the Life Political Action Committee of Southwest Washington, Benton indicated that he believes life begins at conception, the State has a compelling interest in protecting human life beginning at conception, abortion is never morally permissible, and medical professionals should be allowed to deny service based on their moral, ethical or religious beliefs. In the survey he also said, "To my knowledge, I am the only Senator to ever sponsor and successfully pass parental notification law in the state senate. It was killed in the House."

=== Crime ===
In 2005 Benton introduced the Chelsea Harrison Act, which was eventually enacted and signed into law in 2008. The statute amended the state's three-strikes law to expand the law's repeat offender criteria by including persons convicted of felony sexual assault in other states. Benton has previously introduced legislation to apply the death penalty to cases of premeditated murder where the victim is a child.

=== Gay marriage ===
Benton opposes gay marriage and civil unions, saying on the Senate floor that those laws affect "less than a half of one percent of the population."

=== Higher education ===
In 2010 Benton, who served as a student member of the Board of Trustees at California's College of the Canyons, introduced legislation to create a sixth trustee position at Washington community colleges, which would be filled with a student appointment. Benton has voted against proposed tuition increases at state colleges and universities, but has stated his opposition to offering in-state tuition to undocumented immigrants. In 2008 he broke with the senate Republican caucus and supported legislation to extend collective bargaining rights to research assistants at Washington State University.

=== Taxes ===
Benton supports reducing taxes on small businesses and has also supported efforts to raise the property tax exemption amount for the elderly and disabled. After Washington Initiative 1185 (a measure that required the legislature to submit proposed tax increases to public referendum) was declared unconstitutional by the state supreme court in 2012, Benton stated his support for an amendment to the state constitution that would incorporate the essence of the nullified statute. Benton has said he is in alignment with many members of the Tea Party movement.

=== Transportation ===
Benton has been a vocal opponent of the Columbia River Crossing, calling the proposed bridge an unnecessarily expensive replacement for the existing Interstate Bridge. Benton has also expressed concern at tolling plans outlined for the proposed bridge which, he claimed, could cost Clark County residents – many of whom commute to Portland, Oregon daily – $100 per month or more.

While the legislature ultimately approved partial funding on the project, Democratic governor Jay Inslee vetoed the measure, earning praise from Benton. When Oregon attempted to move ahead on the bridge without Washington's support, Benton introduced a measure in the legislature to block Clark County's public transit agency C-Tran from cooperating with Oregon state agencies on the project. C-Tran had previously suggested it might enact eminent domain on properties on the Washington side of the Washington-Oregon border on behalf of Oregon transportation planners.

=== Trump administration ===
Benton has been described as a Trump loyalist in regards to his support of former president Donald Trump. After Joe Biden defeated Trump in the 2020 election and Trump refused to concede, Benton supported Trump's refusal to concede and challenge the election results.

== Awards ==
- 2014 Guardians of Small Business award. Presented by NFIB.

== Personal life ==
Benton's father was a former member of the Agua Dulce, California school board. Benton has four children with his wife, Mary, who currently runs his former advertising consultancy.

Political offices
Preceded by Lawrence Romo	Director of the Selective Service System; 2017–2021	Incumbent
