= Kevin Waters (politician) =

American politician from Washington

Member of the Washington House of Representatives from the 17th district
- Incumbent
- Assumed office January 9, 2023 Serving with David Stuebe
- Preceded by: Vicki Kraft
- Succeeded by: Ben Christly (elect)

Personal details
- Party: Republican
- Spouse: Jami Waters
- Education: Eastern Washington University

Kevin Waters is an American politician of the Republican Party. He is a member of the Washington State Legislature from the Washington's 17th legislative district.

Waters has been married to his wife Jami for 11 years, and they have two daughters, Lindsey and Avery.

Waters has lived in Southwest Washington his entire life. He is involved in his family's brewery, Backwoods Brewing, which was started by his father in 2012.
