= Busse Nutley =

Washington state Representative (born 1949)

Member of the Washington House of Representatives from the 49th district
- In office January 14, 1985 – January 14, 1991
- Preceded by: Shirley Galloway
- Succeeded by: Val Ogden

Personal details
- Born: January 2, 1949 (age 77)
- Party: Democratic

Busse Nutley (born January 2, 1949) is an American politician who served in the Washington House of Representatives from the 49th district from 1985 to 1991.
