= David Stuebe =

American politician

Member of the Washington House of Representatives from the 17th district
- Incumbent
- Assumed office January 13, 2025 Serving with Kevin Waters
- Preceded by: Paul Harris

Personal details
- Born: David Wayne Stuebe; 1960 (age 65–66)
- Party: Republican
- Children: 4
- Education: University of Redlands

David Wayne Stuebe (born ~1960) is an American politician from Washington.

== Early life and education ==
He earned a degree in political science from the University of Redlands.

== Career ==
Steube served in the U.S. Marine Corps for thirty years, both active duty and reserves. He retired as a Colonel. For twenty years, he worked in management and leadership roles at various pharmaceutical companies.

In March 2021, Stuebe was appointed to the Washougal City Council. He currently serves as mayor of Washougal.

In November 2024, Stuebe was elected to represent the 17th district in the Washington House of Representatives. He won by 807 votes (50.4%) against Democrat Terri Niles.

== Personal life ==
Stuebe has been married to Paige Stuebe since 2017. He has four adult children.

He has lived in Washougal since 2007.
