= Paul Harris (politician) =

American politician from Washington

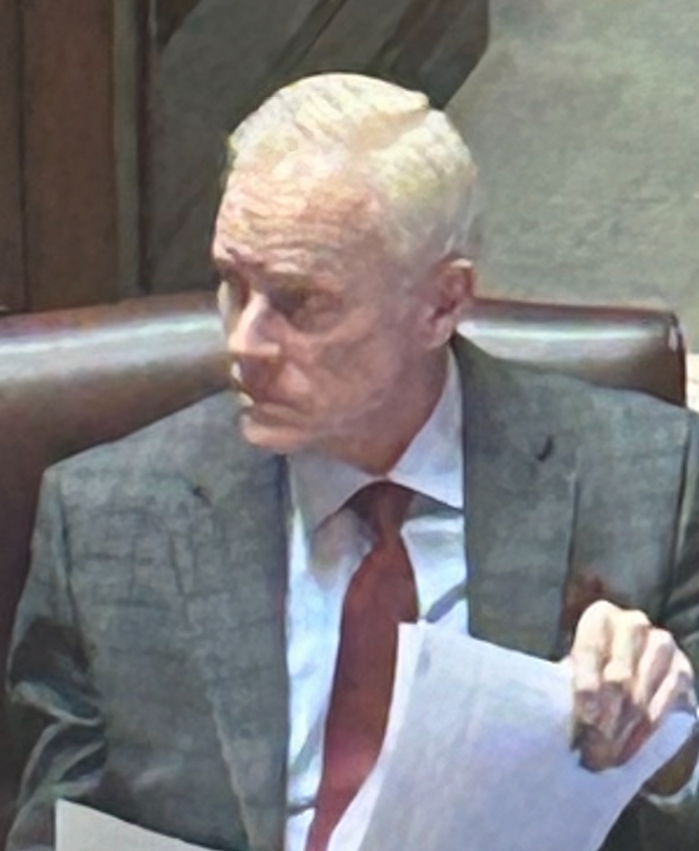
- Harris in 2025

Member of the Washington State Senate from the 17th district
- Incumbent
- Assumed office January 13, 2025
- Preceded by: Lynda Wilson

Member of the Washington House of Representatives from the 17th district
- In office January 10, 2011 – January 13, 2025
- Preceded by: Deb Wallace
- Succeeded by: David Stuebe

Personal details
- Born: April 12, 1953 (age 73) Portland, Oregon, U.S.
- Party: Republican
- Spouse: Lori Harris
- Children: 5
- Education: Brigham Young University

Paul L. Harris (born April 12, 1953) is an American politician of the Republican Party. He has served in both chambers of the Washington State Legislature.

== Career ==
Harris owned Cascade Paint & Supply and was Vice President of Miller Paint Company.

He previously served on the Evergreen School Board of Directors.

In 2010, he was elected to represent Washington's 17th district in the Washington House of Representatives. In 2024, he was elected to the Washington Senate, winning 51.09% of the vote.

== Personal life ==
Harris is married to Lori Harris. They have five children. Harris and his family live in Vancouver, Washington.

He is a member of the Church of Jesus Christ of Latter-Day Saints.

He is a cancer survivor.
