= Dean Sutherland =

American politician

Member of the Washington Senate from the 17th district
- In office January 9, 1989 – July 15, 1996
- Preceded by: George Rohrbacher
- Succeeded by: Shirley Galloway

Member of the Washington House of Representatives from the 17th district
- In office January 10, 1983 – January 9, 1989
- Preceded by: Robert L. Chamberlain
- Succeeded by: Holly Myers

Personal details
- Born: March 24, 1954 (age 72)
- Party: Democratic

Dean Sutherland (born March 24, 1954) is an American politician who served in the Washington House of Representatives from the 17th district from 1983 to 1989 and in the Washington State Senate from the 17th district from 1989 to 1996.
