= Deb Wallace =

Washington State politician

Member of the Washington House of Representatives from the 17th district
- In office January 13, 2003 – January 10, 2011
- Preceded by: Jim Dunn
- Succeeded by: Paul Harris

Personal details
- Born: 1957 (age 68–69) Washington, U.S.
- Party: Democratic
- Spouse: John Wallace
- Education: Central Washington University (B.S.); Marylhurst University (attended)
- Occupation: Transportation planning manager

Deb Wallace (born 1957) is a former American politician who served as a member of the Washington House of Representatives from 2003 to 2011. She represented Washington's 17th legislative district as a Democrat for four consecutive terms. While in the legislature, she served as chair of the House Committee on Higher Education. She ran in the 2010 election to represent Washington's 3rd congressional district in the United States House of Representatives, but dropped out of the race in February.
