= Jim Dunn (Washington politician) =

American politician

Member of the Washington House of Representatives from the 17th district
- In office January 10, 2005 – January 12, 2009
- Preceded by: Marc Boldt
- Succeeded by: Tim Probst
- In office January 13, 1997 – January 13, 2003
- Preceded by: Don Benton
- Succeeded by: Deb Wallace

Personal details
- Born: 1942 (age 83–84) Anchorage, Alaska, U.S.
- Party: Republican
- Spouse: Joan Dunn
- Children: 2
- Education: Louisiana State University
- Website: www.jimdunn.com

Jim Dunn (born 1942) is an American politician and a former member of the Washington House of Representatives. He represented the 17th Legislative District from 1996-2003 and 2006-2009. He is a member of the Republican Party.

== State government ==
Republican State Representative for the 17th Legislative District of Washington from 1996 through 2002; elected State Representative for that district again in 2004 and 2006, again as a Republican. Dunn lost his primary bid for re-election in 2008.

== Personal ==
Dunn and his wife, Joan, have been married since 1964 and have lived in Clark County since 1977. They have two grown children and five grandchildren.

A Vietnam veteran, Representative Dunn served three enlistments in the U.S. Air Force and Reserves. He is also a descendant of pioneer families from the Washington and Alaska territories.

== Community activism ==
- Knights of Columbus
- County Charter Board
- Holy Redeemer Catholic Church
- Loyal Order of Moose
- American Legion
