= Barbara Lampert =

American perennial candidate from Washington

Barbara D. Lampert (born April 25, 1946) is an American perennial candidate from the state of Washington. Lampert, a former nurse's aide from Spokane, has been elected a Democratic Party precinct committee officer but has not had success achieving higher office, despite running for a variety of positions 15 times from 1996 through 2011. Lampert received a B.A. degree in economics from the University of Washington. She has said she intends to run for office until she wins, or until she reaches the age of 70 years.
