= David M. Morris =

American physiotherapist

- Education: University of North Carolina at Chapel Hill; University of Alabama at Birmingham
- Occupation: Physiotherapist

David M. Morris is an American physiotherapist. He is a distinguished professor in the department of physical therapy at the University of Alabama at Birmingham.
