= Tim Probst =

American politician from Washington

Member of the Washington House of Representatives from the 17th district
- In office January 12, 2009 – January 14, 2013
- Preceded by: Jim Dunn
- Succeeded by: Monica Stonier

Personal details
- Occupation: Politician

Timothy P. Probst is an American politician of the Democratic Party. He is a former member of the Washington House of Representatives, where he represented the 17th district from 2009 to 2013.

Tim has published a book "Joe Lake Journal - A Trail Guide to a Better America After the Coronavirus", May 11, 2020, ISBN 9798640114584.
