= Brendan Williams (politician) =

American politician from Washington

Member of the Washington House of Representatives from the 22nd district
- In office January 10, 2005 – January 10, 2011
- Preceded by: Sandra Singery Romero
- Succeeded by: Chris Reykdal

Personal details
- Born: 1968 (age 57–58)
- Party: Democratic

Brendan W. Williams (born 1968) is an American politician who served in the Washington House of Representatives from 2005 to 2011, representing Washington's 22nd legislative district.

== Background ==
Williams served as the executive director of the Washington Health Care Association (WHCA) prior to elective office. He also worked as a private practice attorney and a deputy insurance commissioner in Olympia, Washington.

While the head of WHCA, Williams argued a tax case against the Washington Department of Revenue on behalf of boarding homes and negotiated a settlement ratified by the Legislature in 2004. Under the settlement, estimated to be worth over $31 million in just the first four years, boarding homes pay less than one-fifth of the tax rate the state was looking to impose through a change in regulatory interpretation. During his tenure, nursing home care faced proposed $72 million Medicaid budget cuts each year from 2002 to 2004; the cut proposed in 2002 would have been $14.13 per day for each patient. WHCA defeated those cuts each legislative session and turned them into a $33.1 million funding increase in 2003 and a $19.3 million funding increase in 2004 that boarding homes shared.

Williams is the author of law review articles, with one cited by the Select Committee to Investigate the January 6th Attack on the United States Capitol in the first chapter of its December 2022 report, and dozens of newspaper columns largely advocating for the care of those with disabilities.

== Term as legislator ==
Williams served as a Democratic Party member of the Washington House of Representatives. As a legislator, he promised to serve only three terms in a safe district.

In 2010, he worked to save a correctional facility in a Republican district. The Tacoma News Tribune reported "Republicans backed Democratic Rep. Brendan Williams' amendment, but he couldn't get much help from his own party, and it failed on a 45-52 vote. Williams then became one of a few Democrats to vote against their party's budget." That year Williams also offered a budget amendment to cut legislators' per diem payments equal to any pay cuts to state employees, which was rejected. Following the budget vote, the Associated Press reported that "[I]n a scathing e-mail sent to his constituents . . . Rep. Brendan Williams, D-Olympia, railed against cuts to programs like nursing home care, education and natural resources."

Referred to as "Olympia's iconic liberal state legislator" by The Olympian in 2010, Williams advocated rights for Washington homeowners. Under Washington law those purchasing new homes have no warranty rights and cannot recover for negligence as they can in other states. Quoting a building industry publication that pushed "the no-warranty message," Spokane's Spokesman Review described Williams in 2009 as "the building group's great Satan." He put forward a number of bills in favor of homeowners' rights; while such bills passed the Senate and House Judiciary Committee they were denied House floor votes. They had strong support from Washington newspapers, KOMO TV News investigations, business leaders who suffered negligent construction themselves, and military families in Williams' district.

Williams was the prime sponsor of many laws, such as one protecting churches and health clinics from insurance cancellation when targeted by crimes like arson, which was the first in the nation to do so, a law creating sexual assault protection orders; a law preventing local governments from interfering with churches housing the homeless; and another allowing domestic violence victims to remove pets as part of protection orders.

With 123 state legislative races on the ballot in his final race in 2008, Williams received the 4th-highest vote total of any winning candidate.

== Awards and honors ==
In 2009, Fuse Washington recognized Williams with a "Sizzle" Award for "Favorite Gunslinger." The award recognized Williams for his work to advance consumer protection and campaign finance reforms in Washington State.

He also received recognition from other organizations such as the Autism Society of Washington. Newspapers praised his work for open government.

== Sexual Misconduct Allegations ==
In November 2017, several women accused Williams of inappropriate sexual conduct. Williams has denied any misconduct.
