= Washington's 17th legislative district =

Legislative district in Washington, US

Coordinates: 45°41′N 122°35′W

Washington's 17th legislative district

Washington's 17th legislative district is one of forty-nine districts in Washington state for representation in the state legislature.

The district includes eastern Vancouver and other parts of southwest Clark County east of I-205, as well as parts of Klickitat County including White Salmon and Goldendale.

This urban district is represented state senator Paul Harris and state representatives Kevin Waters (position 1) and David Stuebe (position 2), all Republicans.

== Demographics ==
The 17th Legislative District's population is 156,767 people, 75% white, 9% Hispanic, 6% Asian. Average household income is $99,363. Median home value is $498,400. 93.8% graduated from high school, 37.1% graduated with a bachelor's degree.

== See also ==
- Washington Redistricting Commission
- Washington State Legislature
- Washington State Senate
- Washington House of Representatives
