= 2020 Washington State Senate election =

Washington State Senate elections, 2020
- November 3, 2020

26 of 49 seats in the Washington State Senate 25 seats needed for a majority

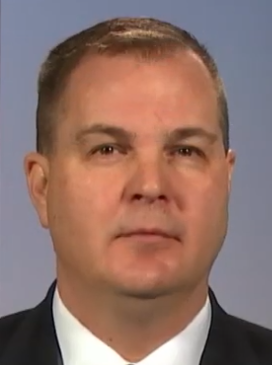
| | Majority party | Minority party |
|---|---|---|
| Leader | Andy Billig | John Braun |
| Party | Democratic | Republican |
| Leader's seat | 33rd | 20th |
| Last election | 28 | 21 |
| Seats won | 28 | 21 |
| Seat change | Steady | Steady |
| Popular vote | 987,057 | 943,884 |
| Percentage | 49.59% | 47.42% |
| Swing | ▼14.96 pp | ▲13.50 pp |
- Results: Democratic gain Republican gain Democratic hold Republican hold No election
Majority Leader before election
Andy Billig
Democratic
Elected Majority Leader
Andy Billig
Democratic

The 2020 Washington State Senate elections took place as part of the biennial 2020 United States elections. Washington voters elected state senators in 26 of the 49 state legislative districts. Elections to the Washington State Senate were held on November 3, 2020.

Following the previous election in 2018, Democrats held a 28-seat majority in the Senate, compared to Republicans' 21 seats. Senators who did not run for re-election were Randi Becker, Maureen Walsh, and Hans Zeiger (all Republicans).

Democrats retained control of the Washington State Senate following the 2020 general election, with the balance of power remaining unchanged: 28 (D) to 21 (R).

== Predictions ==
| Source | Ranking | As of |
|---|---|---|
| The Cook Political Report | Likely D | October 21, 2020 |

== Summary of results by State Senate district ==
- Districts not listed were not up for election in 2020.

| State Senate district | Incumbent | Party | Elected Senator | Party |
|---|---|---|---|---|
| 1st | Derek Stanford | Dem | Derek Stanford | Dem |
| 2nd | Randi Becker | Rep | Jim McCune | Rep |
| 3rd | Andy Billig | Dem | Andy Billig | Dem |
| 4th | Mike Padden | Rep | Mike Padden | Rep |
| 5th | Mark Mullet | Dem | Mark Mullet | Dem |
| 9th | Mark Schoesler | Rep | Mark Schoesler | Rep |
| 10th | Ron Muzzall | Rep | Ron Muzzall | Rep |
| 11th | Bob Hasegawa | Dem | Bob Hasegawa | Dem |
| 12th | Brad Hawkins | Rep | Brad Hawkins | Rep |
| 14th | Curtis King | Rep | Curtis King | Rep |
| 16th | Maureen Walsh | Rep | Perry Dozier | Rep |
| 17th | Lynda Wilson | Rep | Lynda Wilson | Rep |
| 18th | Ann Rivers | Rep | Ann Rivers | Rep |
| 19th | Dean Takko | Dem | Jeff Wilson | Rep |
| 20th | John Braun | Rep | John Braun | Rep |
| 22nd | Sam Hunt | Dem | Sam Hunt | Dem |
| 23rd | Christine Rolfes | Dem | Christine Rolfes | Dem |
| 24th | Kevin Van De Wege | Dem | Kevin Van De Wege | Dem |
| 25th | Hans Zeiger | Rep | Chris Gildon | Rep |
| 27th | Jeannie Darneille | Dem | Jeannie Darneille | Dem |
| 28th | Steve O'Ban | Rep | T'wina Nobles | Dem |
| 38th Special | June Robinson | Dem | June Robinson | Dem |
| 39th | Keith Wagoner | Rep | Keith Wagoner | Rep |
| 40th | Liz Lovelett | Dem | Liz Lovelett | Dem |
| 41st | Lisa Wellman | Dem | Lisa Wellman | Dem |
| 49th | Annette Cleveland | Dem | Annette Cleveland | Dem |

== Detailed results ==
Each party flipped a seat and the composition stayed at 28 D–21 R. Senators Dean Takko (D) and Steve O'Ban (R) lost reelection.

- Note: Washington uses a top two primary system. Official primary results can be obtained here and official general election results here.

=== District 1 ===
Washington's 1st legislative district State Senate election, 2020
Primary election
| Party | Candidate | Votes | % |
|---|---|---|---|
| Democratic | Derek Stanford (incumbent) | 34,445 | 63.5 |
| Republican | Art Coday | 19,778 | 36.5 |
| Total votes | | 54,223 | 100.0 |
General election
| Democratic | Derek Stanford (incumbent) | 55,496 | 63.3 |
| Republican | Art Coday | 32,168 | 36.7 |
| Total votes | | 87,664 | 100.0 |
| Democratic hold | | | |

=== District 2 ===
Washington's 2nd legislative district State Senate election, 2020
Primary election
| Party | Candidate | Votes | % |
|---|---|---|---|
| Democratic | Rick Payne | 14,136 | 29.6 |
| Republican | Jim McCune | 10,158 | 21.3 |
| Republican | Josh Penner | 8,406 | 17.6 |
| Republican | Ronda Litzenberger | 7,153 | 15.0 |
| Republican | Gina Blanchard-Reed | 4,133 | 8.6 |
| Republican | Matthew Smith | 3,812 | 7.9 |
| Total votes | | 47,798 | 100.0 |
General election
| Republican | Jim McCune | 51,941 | 63.8 |
| Democratic | Rick Payne | 29,477 | 36.2 |
| Total votes | | 81,418 | 100.0 |
| Republican hold | | | |

=== District 3 ===
Washington's 3rd legislative district State Senate election, 2020
Primary election
| Party | Candidate | Votes | % |
|---|---|---|---|
| Democratic | Andy Billig (incumbent) | 21,528 | 58.8 |
| Republican | Dave Lucas | 15,058 | 41.2 |
| Total votes | | 36,586 | 100.0 |
General election
| Democratic | Andy Billig (incumbent) | 38,858 | 58.3 |
| Republican | Dave Lucas | 27,848 | 41.7 |
| Total votes | | 66,706 | 100.0 |
| Democratic hold | | | |

=== District 4 ===
Washington's 4th legislative district State Senate election, 2020
Primary election
| Party | Candidate | Votes | % |
|---|---|---|---|
| Republican | Mike Padden (incumbent) | 31,700 | 60.9 |
| Democratic | John Roskelley | 17,232 | 33.1 |
| Independent | Ann Marie Danimus | 3,158 | 6.0 |
| Total votes | | 52,090 | 100.0 |
General election
| Republican | Mike Padden (incumbent) | 56,161 | 62.6 |
| Democratic | John Roskelley | 33,506 | 37.4 |
| Total votes | | 89,667 | 100.0 |
| Republican hold | | | |

=== District 5 ===
Washington's 5th legislative district State Senate election, 2020
Primary election
| Party | Candidate | Votes | % |
|---|---|---|---|
| Democratic | Ingrid Anderson | 24,144 | 50.5 |
| Democratic | Mark Mullet (incumbent) | 23,653 | 49.5 |
| Total votes | | 47,797 | 100.0 |
General election
| Democratic | Mark Mullet (incumbent) | 41,949 | 50.03 |
| Democratic | Ingrid Anderson | 41,892 | 49.97 |
| Total votes | | 83,841 | 100.0 |
| Democratic hold | | | |

=== District 9 ===
Washington's 9th legislative district State Senate election, 2020
Primary election
| Party | Candidate | Votes | % |
|---|---|---|---|
| Republican | Mark G. Schoesler (incumbent) | 26,729 | 67.6 |
| Democratic | Jenn Goulet | 12,783 | 32.4 |
| Total votes | | 39,512 | 100.0 |
General election
| Republican | Mark G. Schoesler (incumbent) | 43,651 | 65.7 |
| Democratic | Jenn Goulet | 22,802 | 34.3 |
| Total votes | | 66,453 | 100.0 |
| Republican hold | | | |

=== District 10 ===
Washington's 10th legislative district State Senate election, 2020
Primary election
| Party | Candidate | Votes | % |
|---|---|---|---|
| Republican | Ron Muzzall (incumbent) | 32,022 | 50.9 |
| Democratic | Helen Price Johnson | 30,943 | 49.1 |
| Total votes | | 62,965 | 100.0 |
General election
| Republican | Ron Muzzall (incumbent) | 47,189 | 51.0 |
| Democratic | Helen Price Johnson | 45,415 | 49.0 |
| Total votes | | 92,604 | 100.0 |
| Republican hold | | | |

=== District 11 ===
Washington's 11th legislative district State Senate election, 2020
Primary election
| Party | Candidate | Votes | % |
|---|---|---|---|
| Democratic | Bob Hasegawa (incumbent) | 29,869 | 100.0 |
| Total votes | | 29,869 | 100.0 |
General election
| Democratic | Bob Hasegawa (incumbent) | 54,606 | 100.0 |
| Total votes | | 54,606 | 100.0 |
| Democratic hold | | | |

=== District 12 ===
Washington's 12th legislative district State Senate election, 2020
Primary election
| Party | Candidate | Votes | % |
|---|---|---|---|
| Republican | Brad Hawkins (incumbent) | 37,449 | 100.0 |
| Total votes | | 37,449 | 100.0 |
General election
| Republican | Brad Hawkins (incumbent) | 58,051 | 100.0 |
| Total votes | | 58,051 | 100.0 |
| Republican hold | | | |

=== District 14 ===
Washington's 14th legislative district State Senate election, 2020
Primary election
| Party | Candidate | Votes | % |
|---|---|---|---|
| Republican | Curtis P. King (incumbent) | 29,157 | 100.0 |
| Total votes | | 29,157 | 100.0 |
General election
| Republican | Curtis P. King (incumbent) | 51,384 | 100.0 |
| Total votes | | 51,384 | 100.0 |
| Republican hold | | | |

=== District 16 ===
Washington's 16th legislative district State Senate election, 2020
Primary election
| Party | Candidate | Votes | % |
|---|---|---|---|
| Democratic | Danielle Garbe Reser | 13,366 | 34.9 |
| Republican | Perry Dozier | 13,318 | 34.8 |
| Republican | William "Bill" Jenkin | 11,618 | 30.3 |
| Total votes | | 38,302 | 100.0 |
General election
| Republican | Perry Dozier | 35,859 | 59.0 |
| Democratic | Danielle Garbe Reser | 24,889 | 41.0 |
| Total votes | | 60,748 | 100.0 |
| Republican hold | | | |

=== District 17 ===
Washington's 17th legislative district State Senate election, 2020
Primary election
| Party | Candidate | Votes | % |
|---|---|---|---|
| Republican | Lynda Wilson (incumbent) | 25,423 | 55.5 |
| Democratic | Daniel Smith | 20,361 | 44.5 |
| Total votes | | 45,784 | 100.0 |
General election
| Republican | Lynda Wilson (incumbent) | 44,671 | 54.6 |
| Democratic | Daniel Smith | 37,196 | 45.4 |
| Total votes | | 81,867 | 100.0 |
| Republican hold | | | |

=== District 18 ===
Washington's 18th legislative district State Senate election, 2020
Primary election
| Party | Candidate | Votes | % |
|---|---|---|---|
| Democratic | Rick Bell | 21,798 | 38.6 |
| Republican | Ann Rivers (incumbent) | 18,401 | 32.5 |
| Republican | John Ley | 16,342 | 28.9 |
| Total votes | | 56,541 | 100.0 |
General election
| Republican | Ann Rivers (incumbent) | 53,269 | 58.2 |
| Democratic | Rick Bell | 38,305 | 41.8 |
| Total votes | | 91,574 | 100.0 |
| Republican hold | | | |

=== District 19 ===
Washington's 19th legislative district State Senate election, 2020
Primary election
| Party | Candidate | Votes | % |
|---|---|---|---|
| Democratic | Dean Takko (incumbent) | 20,948 | 44.4 |
| Republican | Jeff Wilson | 17,454 | 37.0 |
| Republican | Wes Cormier | 8,754 | 18.6 |
| Total votes | | 47,156 | 100.0 |
General election
| Republican | Jeff Wilson | 40,560 | 55.3 |
| Democratic | Dean Takko (incumbent) | 32,773 | 44.7 |
| Total votes | | 73,333 | 100.0 |
| Republican gain from Democratic | | | |

=== District 20 ===
Washington's 20th legislative district State Senate election, 2020
Primary election
| Party | Candidate | Votes | % |
|---|---|---|---|
| Republican | John Braun (incumbent) | 42,604 | 100.0 |
| Total votes | | 42,604 | 100.0 |
General election
| Republican | John Braun (incumbent) | 67,304 | 100.0 |
| Total votes | | 67,304 | 100.0 |
| Republican hold | | | |

=== District 22 ===
Washington's 22nd legislative district State Senate election, 2020
Primary election
| Party | Candidate | Votes | % |
|---|---|---|---|
| Democratic | Sam Hunt (incumbent) | 33,933 | 58.2 |
| Republican | Garry Holland | 18,047 | 31.0 |
| Democratic | Kevin Young | 6,309 | 10.8 |
| Total votes | | 58,289 | 100.0 |
General election
| Democratic | Sam Hunt (incumbent) | 60,806 | 67.3 |
| Republican | Garry Holland | 29,600 | 32.7 |
| Total votes | | 90,406 | 100.0 |
| Democratic hold | | | |

=== District 23 ===
Washington's 23rd legislative district State Senate election, 2020
Primary election
| Party | Candidate | Votes | % |
|---|---|---|---|
| Democratic | Christine Rolfes (incumbent) | 35,727 | 65.7 |
| Republican | Pam Madden-Boyer | 18,692 | 34.3 |
| Total votes | | 54,419 | 100.0 |
General election
| Democratic | Christine Rolfes (incumbent) | 55,170 | 63.9 |
| Republican | Pam Madden-Boyer | 31,107 | 36.1 |
| Total votes | | 86,277 | 100.0 |
| Democratic hold | | | |

=== District 24 ===
Washington's 24th legislative district State Senate election, 2020
Primary election
| Party | Candidate | Votes | % |
|---|---|---|---|
| Democratic | Kevin Van De Wege (incumbent) | 34,751 | 55.1 |
| Republican | Connie Beauvais | 28,279 | 44.9 |
| Total votes | | 63,030 | 100.0 |
General election
| Democratic | Kevin Van De Wege (incumbent) | 49,883 | 54.1 |
| Republican | Connie Beauvais | 42,289 | 45.9 |
| Total votes | | 92,172 | 100.0 |
| Democratic hold | | | |

=== District 25 ===
Washington's 25th legislative district State Senate election, 2020
Primary election
| Party | Candidate | Votes | % |
|---|---|---|---|
| Republican | Chris Gildon | 20,299 | 44.8 |
| Democratic | Julie Door | 19,651 | 43.4 |
| Republican | Emmett Smith | 5,351 | 11.8 |
| Total votes | | 45,301 | 100.0 |
General election
| Republican | Chris Gildon | 41,440 | 53.9 |
| Democratic | Julie Door | 35,476 | 46.1 |
| Total votes | | 76,916 | 100.0 |
| Republican hold | | | |

=== District 27 ===
Washington's 27th legislative district State Senate election, 2020
Primary election
| Party | Candidate | Votes | % |
|---|---|---|---|
| Democratic | Jeannie Darneille (incumbent) | 32,360 | 71.0 |
| Republican | Kyle Paskewitz | 13,236 | 29.0 |
| Total votes | | 45,596 | 100.0 |
General election
| Democratic | Jeannie Darneille (incumbent) | 52,421 | 69.7 |
| Republican | Kyle Paskewitz | 22,785 | 30.3 |
| Total votes | | 75,206 | 100.0 |
| Democratic hold | | | |

=== District 28 ===
Washington's 28th legislative district State Senate election, 2020
Primary election
| Party | Candidate | Votes | % |
|---|---|---|---|
| Democratic | T'wina Nobles | 22,083 | 50.3 |
| Republican | Steve O'Ban (incumbent) | 21,848 | 49.7 |
| Total votes | | 43,931 | 100.0 |
General election
| Democratic | T'wina Nobles | 35,802 | 50.7 |
| Republican | Steve O'Ban (incumbent) | 34,793 | 49.3 |
| Total votes | | 70,595 | 100.0 |
| Democratic gain from Republican | | | |

=== District 38 ===
Washington's 38th legislative district State Senate election, 2020
Primary election
| Party | Candidate | Votes | % |
|---|---|---|---|
| Democratic | June Robinson (incumbent) | 17,822 | 45.3 |
| Republican | Bernard Moody | 16,008 | 40.7 |
| Democratic | Kelly M. Fox | 5,529 | 14.0 |
| Total votes | | 39,359 | 100.0 |
General election
| Democratic | June Robinson (incumbent) | 39,799 | 58.9 |
| Republican | Bernard Moody | 27,818 | 41.1 |
| Total votes | | 67,617 | 100.0 |
| Democratic hold | | | |

=== District 39 ===
Washington's 39th legislative district State Senate election, 2020
Primary election
| Party | Candidate | Votes | % |
|---|---|---|---|
| Republican | Keith L. Wagoner (incumbent) | 32,702 | 67.1 |
| Progressive | Kathryn A. Lewandowsky | 16,065 | 32.9 |
| Total votes | | 48,767 | 100.0 |
General election
| Republican | Keith L. Wagoner (incumbent) | 52,386 | 65.5 |
| Progressive | Kathryn A. Lewandowsky | 27,578 | 34.5 |
| Total votes | | 79,964 | 100.0 |
| Republican hold | | | |

=== District 40 ===
Washington's 40th legislative district State Senate election, 2020
Primary election
| Party | Candidate | Votes | % |
|---|---|---|---|
| Democratic | Elizabeth (Liz) Lovelett (incumbent) | 40,569 | 69.4 |
| Republican | Charles Carrell | 17,890 | 30.6 |
| Total votes | | 58,459 | 100.0 |
General election
| Democratic | Elizabeth (Liz) Lovelett (incumbent) | 60,871 | 69.6 |
| Republican | Charles Carrell | 26,638 | 30.4 |
| Total votes | | 87,509 | 100.0 |
| Democratic hold | | | |

=== District 41 ===
Washington's 41st legislative district State Senate election, 2020
Primary election
| Party | Candidate | Votes | % |
|---|---|---|---|
| Democratic | Lisa Wellman (incumbent) | 36,727 | 71.4 |
| Republican | Mike Nykreim | 14,687 | 28.6 |
| Total votes | | 51,414 | 100.0 |
General election
| Democratic | Lisa Wellman (incumbent) | 58,241 | 70.0 |
| Republican | Mike Nykreim | 24,972 | 30.0 |
| Total votes | | 83,213 | 100.0 |
| Democratic hold | | | |

=== District 49 ===
Washington's 49th legislative district State Senate election, 2020
Primary election
| Party | Candidate | Votes | % |
|---|---|---|---|
| Democratic | Annette Cleveland (incumbent) | 23,540 | 58.0 |
| Independent Republican | Rey Reynolds | 17,078 | 42.0 |
| Total votes | | 40,618 | 100.0 |
General election
| Democratic | Annette Cleveland (incumbent) | 41,424 | 56.6 |
| Independent Republican | Rey Reynolds | 31,803 | 43.4 |
| Total votes | | 73,227 | 100.0 |
| Democratic hold | | | |

== See also ==
- 2020 Washington elections
  - 2020 Washington House of Representatives election
  - 2020 Washington gubernatorial election
  - 2020 Washington lieutenant gubernatorial election
  - 2020 United States presidential election in Washington (state)
  - 2020 United States House of Representatives elections in Washington
