= 2020 Washington lieutenant gubernatorial election =

- November 3, 2020
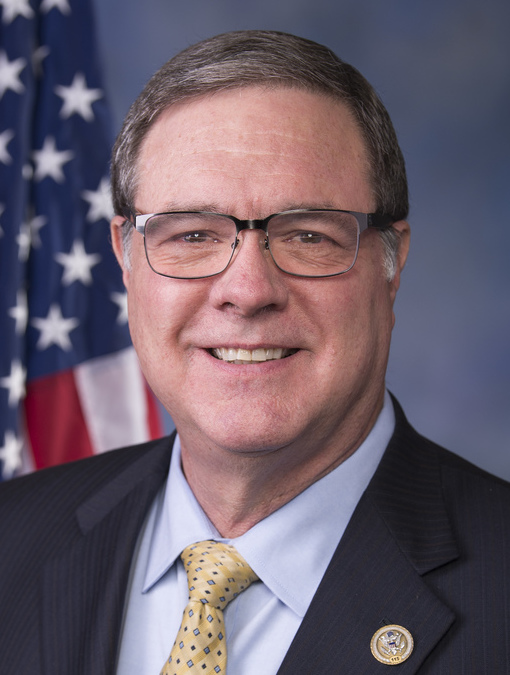

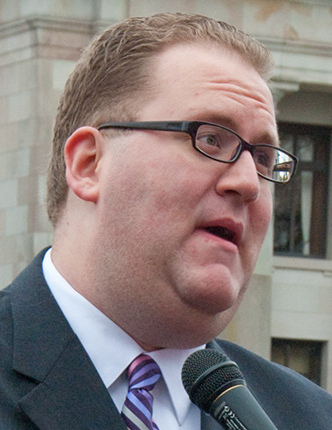

Nominee	Denny Heck	Marko Liias	Write–in (Note: Most Write-ins are thought to be for Joshua Freed, who ran a write-in campaign. However, the election report does not separate the write-in votes by candidate.)
Party	Democratic	Democratic
Popular vote	1,658,405	1,218,548	759,076
Percentage	45.61%	33.51%	20.88%
- Heck: 30–40% 40–50% 50–60% 60–70% 70–80% 80–90% >90% Liias: 30–40% 40–50% 50–60% 60–70% 70–80% 80–90% >90% Write-in: 30–40% 40–50% 50–60% 60–70% 70–80% 80–90% >90% Tie: 30–40% 40–50% 50% No data
Lieutenant Governor before election
Cyrus Habib
Democratic
Elected Lieutenant Governor
Denny Heck
Democratic

The 2020 Washington lieutenant gubernatorial election was held on November 3, 2020, to elect the lieutenant governor of Washington concurrently with the 2020 Washington elections. The top-two primary was held on August 4, and Democrats Denny Heck and Marko Liias advanced to the general election, which Heck won.

Incumbent Cyrus Habib surprised the state by announcing he was foregoing a run for re-election in order to join the Society of Jesus. The position was of special importance due to speculation that the incumbent governor, Jay Inslee, could have been appointed to a position in a Democratic presidential cabinet after winning his third term.

== Background ==
Habib's retirement came after Gov. Inslee dropped out of the presidential election, which caused many potential statewide candidates in Washington to change their plans and drop exploratory bids.

At the time of Habib's announcement former Seattle City Council candidate Ann Davison Sattler and former US House candidate Joseph Brumbles had already been running as Republicans. On the day of his retirement, State Senator Steve Hobbs announced his second campaign for the office of lieutenant governor, after losing in the 2016 primary to then-State Senator Habib.

== Nonpartisan blanket primary ==
=== Democratic Party candidates ===
==== Declared ====
- Denny Heck, U.S. Representative for Washington's 10th congressional district
- Michelle Jasmer, entrepreneur
- Marko Liias, State Senator from Washington's 21st legislative district and candidate for Washington State Treasurer in 2016
- James Rafferty, machinist

==== Withdrew ====
- Steve Hobbs, State Senator from Washington's 44th legislative district

==== Declined ====
- Lisa Brown, Washington Secretary of Commerce, former Congressional candidate, and former State Senate Majority Leader
- Dow Constantine, King County Executive
- Cyrus Habib, incumbent lieutenant governor (endorsed Liias)

==== Endorsements ====
Denny Heck (D)

State politicians

- Christine Gregoire, former governor (2005–2013)

Newspapers

- The Seattle Times
Steve Hobbs (D) (withdrawn)

State politicians

- Gary Locke, former governor (1997–2005)
- Brad Owen, former lieutenant governor (1997–2017)
Marko Liias (D)

State politicians

- Cyrus Habib, incumbent lieutenant governor (2017–2021)

=== Republican Party candidates ===
- Joseph Brumbles, former Congressional candidate
- Ann Davison Sattler, former Seattle City Council candidate, former staffer for John Paul Hammerschmidt
- Marty McClendon, perennial candidate
- Dick Muri, former State Representative from Washington's 28th legislative district
- Bill Penor, candidate for lieutenant governor in 2016

=== Minor party candidates ===
==== Declared ====
- Jared Frerichs (Libertarian), former Candidate for Walla Walla County Commission, consultant
- Mark Greene (Revived Citizens Party), perennial candidate

=== Polling ===
Poll source	Date(s) administered	Sample size (Note: Key: A – all adults RV – registered voters LV – likely voters V – unclear)	Margin of error	Joseph Brumbles (R)	Ann Sattler (R)	Denny Heck (D)	Steve Hobbs (D)	Marko Liias (D)	Other / undecided
SurveyUSA/KING 5	July 22–27, 2020	513 (LV)	± 5.4%	14%	10%	34%	–	14%	29% (Note: "Some other candidate" with 5%; Undecided with 24%)
SurveyUSA/KING 5	May 16–19, 2020	650 (LV)	± 5.6%	10%	9%	15%	10%	6%	50% (Note: Undecided with 50%)

=== Results ===
A top-two primary took place on August 4. All candidates were listed on the same ballot regardless of party affiliation, and the top two advanced to the general election in November.

County results Heck: 10–20%; 20–30%; 30–40%; 40–50%; Liias: 30–40%; Davison: 20–30%; McClendon: 10–20%; 20–30%

Congressional district results Heck: 20–30%; 30–40%; Liias: 40–50%; McClendon: 10–20%; 20–30%

2020 Washington lieutenant gubernatorial election
Party	Candidate	Votes	%
Democratic	Denny Heck	596,289	25.01
Democratic	Marko Liias	441,791	18.53
Republican	Ann Davison Sattler	285,597	11.98
Republican	Marty McClendon	271,995	11.41
Republican	Dick Muri	241,939	10.15
Democratic	Michelle Jasmer	212,387	8.91
Republican	Joseph Brumbles	174,823	7.33
Democratic	James R. Rafferty	57,405	2.41
Republican	Bill Penor	49,225	2.06
Libertarian	Matt Seymour	27,125	1.14
Libertarian	Jared Frerichs	20,847	0.87
Write-in		5,205	0.22
Total votes		2,384,628	100.00

Counties that flipped from Democratic to Republican

- Clark (largest city: Vancouver)
- Cowlitz (largest city: Longview)
- Grays Harbor (largest city: Aberdeen)
- Mason (largest city: Shelton)

==== By congressional district ====
District	Heck	Liias	Davison	McClendon	Muri	Jasmer	Brumbles	Representative
1st	23%	20%	17%	11%	9%	9%	7%	Suzan DelBene
2nd	25%	21%	12%	10%	8%	10%	7%	Rick Larsen
3rd	20%	12%	13%	13%	15%	9%	11%	Jaime Herrera Beutler
4th	11%	7%	15%	22%	12%	9%	13%	Dan Newhouse
5th	14%	10%	13%	20%	10%	10%	10%	Cathy McMorris Rodgers
6th	31%	13%	9%	16%	10%	9%	6%	Derek Kilmer
7th	31%	42%	8%	3%	3%	9%	2%	Pramila Jayapal
8th	22%	14%	15%	12%	14%	8%	8%	Kim Schrier
9th	29%	28%	10%	5%	7%	11%	4%	Adam Smith
10th	38%	9%	10%	8%	17%	6%	8%	Denny Heck

== General election ==
After being eliminated in the August 4th gubernatorial primary, Joshua Freed announced he would be running for lieutenant governor as a write-in candidate. A debate between Heck and Liias was held on October 22.

=== Candidates ===
- Denny Heck (Democratic), U.S. Representative for Washington's 10th congressional district
- Marko Liias (Democratic), State Senator from Washington's 21st legislative district and candidate for Washington State Treasurer in 2016
- Joshua Freed (Republican, write-in), former mayor of Bothell and candidate for Governor in 2020

=== Polling ===
Poll source	Date(s) administered	Sample size	Margin of error	Denny Heck (D)	Marko Liias (D)	Undecided
PPP/NPI	October 14–15, 2020	610 (LV)	± 4%	32%	16%	52%
SurveyUSA/KING-TV	October 8–10, 2020	591 (LV)	± 5.2%	31%	18%	52%

=== Results ===
2020 Washington lieutenant gubernatorial election
Party	Candidate	Votes	%
Democratic	Denny Heck	1,658,405	45.61%
Democratic	Marko Liias	1,218,548	33.51%
Write-in		759,076	20.88%
Total votes		3,636,029	100.00%
Democratic hold			

==== By county ====
County results
County	Denny Heck Democratic		Marko Liias Democratic		Write-in Various		Margin		Total votes
County	#	%	#	%	#	%	#	%	Total votes
Adams	1,745	35.47%	1,263	25.67%	1,912	38.86%	-167	-3.39%	4,920
Asotin	4,787	49.87%	3,024	31.50%	1,788	18.63%	1,763	18.37%	9,599
Benton	31,966	35.60%	25,824	28.76%	32,006	35.64%	-40	-0.04%	89,796
Chelan	14,442	38.00%	9,609	25.28%	13,959	36.72%	483	1.27%	38,010
Clallam	21,018	49.31%	12,018	28.19%	9,589	22.50%	9,000	21.11%	42,625
Clark	104,477	44.29%	77,848	33.00%	53,594	22.72%	26,629	11.29%	235,919
Columbia	737	36.63%	445	22.12%	830	41.25%	-93	-4.62%	2,012
Cowlitz	21,896	41.68%	12,862	24.49%	17,772	33.83%	4,124	7.85%	52,530
Douglas	6,540	34.55%	4,013	21.20%	8,378	44.26%	-1,838	-9.71%	18,931
Ferry	1,417	39.42%	876	24.37%	1,302	36.22%	115	3.20%	3,595
Franklin	9,991	34.80%	8,444	29.41%	10,275	35.79%	-284	-0.99%	28,710
Garfield	450	38.07%	270	22.84%	462	39.09%	-12	-1.02%	1,182
Grant	11,208	34.65%	7,745	23.94%	13,394	41.41%	-2,186	-6.76%	32,347
Grays Harbor	17,540	51.93%	8,184	24.23%	8,053	23.84%	9,356	27.70%	33,777
Island	21,801	45.87%	14,527	30.57%	11,197	23.56%	7,274	15.31%	47,525
Jefferson	12,405	55.12%	6,575	29.22%	3,524	15.66%	5,830	25.91%	22,504
King	528,350	48.48%	450,920	41.37%	110,649	10.15%	77,430	7.10%	1,089,919
Kitsap	67,714	48.33%	45,176	32.25%	27,211	19.42%	22,538	16.09%	140,101
Kittitas	8,721	38.33%	6,271	27.56%	7,761	34.11%	960	4.22%	22,753
Klickitat	4,489	40.31%	3,326	29.87%	3,321	29.82%	1,163	10.44%	11,136
Lewis	14,871	36.97%	7,886	19.60%	17,469	43.43%	-2,598	-6.46%	40,226
Lincoln	1,791	29.12%	933	15.17%	3,427	55.71%	-1,636	-26.60%	6,151
Mason	16,799	50.58%	7,847	23.62%	8,569	25.80%	8,230	24.78%	33,215
Okanogan	7,060	38.68%	4,706	25.78%	6,486	35.54%	574	3.14%	18,252
Pacific	6,582	54.16%	2,984	24.55%	2,588	21.29%	3,598	29.60%	12,154
Pend Oreille	2,691	39.46%	1,859	27.26%	2,269	33.27%	422	6.19%	6,819
Pierce	208,744	49.35%	116,055	27.44%	98,202	23.22%	92,689	21.91%	423,001
San Juan	4,664	40.07%	5,444	46.77%	1,532	13.16%	-780	-6.70%	11,640
Skagit	27,860	44.59%	18,354	29.37%	16,270	26.04%	9,506	15.21%	62,484
Skamania	2,664	43.13%	1,701	27.54%	1,812	29.33%	852	13.79%	6,177
Snohomish	170,585	42.82%	137,233	34.45%	90,571	22.73%	33,352	8.37%	398,389
Spokane	105,859	41.56%	83,458	32.76%	65,401	25.68%	22,401	8.79%	254,718
Stevens	8,207	34.60%	5,191	21.88%	10,322	43.52%	-2,115	-8.92%	23,720
Thurston	82,291	53.83%	41,867	27.39%	28,723	18.79%	40,424	26.44%	152,881
Wahkiakum	1,076	42.97%	598	23.88%	830	33.15%	246	9.82%	2,504
Walla Walla	11,053	41.80%	8,390	31.73%	6,997	26.46%	2,663	10.07%	26,440
Whatcom	51,328	40.28%	42,318	33.21%	33,797	26.52%	9,010	7.07%	127,443
Whitman	7,707	42.44%	6,572	36.19%	3,882	21.38%	1,135	6.25%	18,161
Yakima	34,879	41.64%	25,932	30.96%	22,952	27.40%	8,947	10.68%	83,763
Totals	1,658,405	45.61%	1,218,548	33.51%	759,076	20.88%	439,857	12.10%	3,636,029
