= Sally Flint =

American politician (1931-2020)

Member of the Washington House of Representatives from the 28th district
- In office January 9, 1980 – November 4, 1980 Serving with Shirley Winsley
- Preceded by: Ted Haley
- Succeeded by: Stanley C. Johnson

Personal details
- Born: August 3, 1931 Chicago, Illinois, U.S.
- Died: October 18, 2020 (aged 89) Hood River, Oregon, U.S.
- Party: Republican
- Spouse: Tom
- Children: 3
- Education: University of Colorado (B.A.)

Sally Flint (1931–2020) was an American politician who served in the Washington State House for the 28th district. She was appointed to the seat in January 1980, after Ted Haley was elected to the Washington State Senate, and served until November 4, 1980, when Stanley Johnson was elected to the seat.
