= 2022 Washington Secretary of State special election =

- November 8, 2022
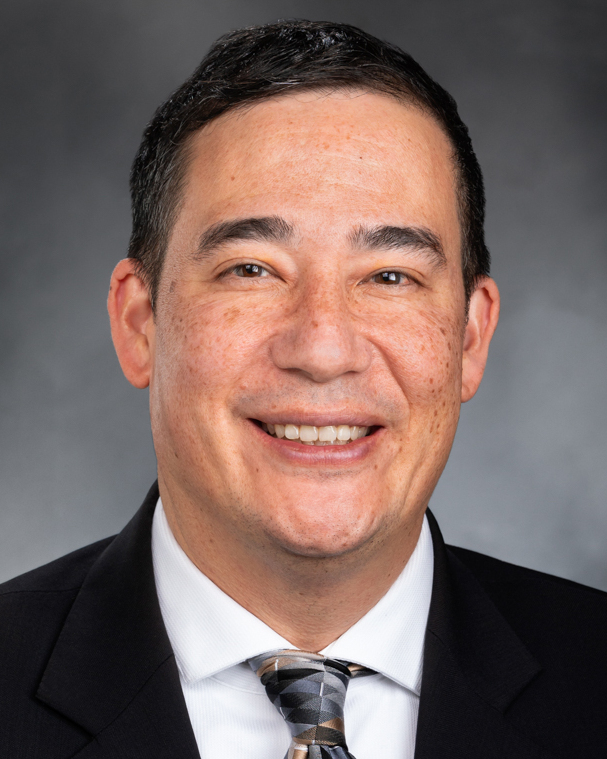

Nominee	Steve Hobbs	Julie Anderson
Party	Democratic	Nonpartisan
Popular vote	1,468,521	1,351,926
Percentage	49.77%	45.82%
- Hobbs: 40–50% 50–60% 60–70% 70–80% 80–90% >90% Anderson: 30–40% 40–50% 50–60% 60–70% 70–80% 80–90% Tie: 40–50% 50% No data
Secretary of State before election
Steve Hobbs
Democratic
Elected Secretary of State
Steve Hobbs
Democratic

The 2022 Washington Secretary of State special election was held on November 8, 2022. Incumbent Kim Wyman, a Republican, resigned from the office on November 19, 2021, to become the senior election security lead for the Cybersecurity and Infrastructure Security Agency in the Biden administration's Department of Homeland Security. Washington governor Jay Inslee, a Democrat, announced he would appoint state senator Steve Hobbs as her replacement, the first Democrat to hold the office in more than fifty years.

In the primary election, Hobbs easily took first place. The race for the second spot in the general election was a close three-way battle between state senator Keith Wagoner and technician Bob Hagglund, both Republicans, and Pierce County Auditor Julie Anderson, an Independent. After a week of tabulation, Anderson was declared to have won second place and moved on to the general election. Brad Klippert, a Republican state representative, ran a write-in campaign in the general election.

Hobbs narrowly won the general election with 49.8% of the vote, over 7% less than the vote share won by Patty Murray in the concurrent U.S. Senate race. This marked the first time since 1960 that a Democrat was elected Washington Secretary of State.

== Primary election ==
=== Democratic Party ===
==== Declared ====
- Steve Hobbs, incumbent Washington Secretary of State
- Marquez Tiggs

=== Republican Party ===
==== Declared ====
- Tamborine Borrelli, (Note: Borrelli listed on the ballot, under the "America First (R)" party designation.) director of the Washington Election Integrity Coalition United and Independent candidate for Washington's 10th congressional district in 2018
- Bob Hagglund, technician
- Mark Miloscia, former state senator (2015–2019)
- Keith Wagoner, state senator (2018–present)

=== Independents and third parties ===
==== Declared ====
- Julie Anderson (nonpartisan), Pierce County auditor
- Kurtis Engle (Union)

=== Forum ===
2022 Washington Secretary of State candidate forum
No.	Date	Host	Moderator	Link	Nonpartisan	Republican	Unity	Republican	Democratic	Republican	Democratic	Republican
Key: P Participant A Absent N Not invited I Invited W Withdrawn												
Key: P Participant A Absent N Not invited I Invited W Withdrawn					Julie Anderson	Tamborine Borrelli	Kurtis Engle	Bob Hagglund	Steve Hobbs	Mark Miloscia	Marquez Tiggs	Keith Wagoner
1	Jul. 14, 2022	League of Women; Voters of Washington; The Spokesman-Review; TVW	Laurel Demkovich	TVW	P	N	N	P	P	P	P	N

=== Endorsements ===
Steve Hobbs (D)

Statewide officials

- Bob Ferguson, Attorney General of Washington (2013–present)
- Gary Locke, 21st Governor of Washington (1997–2005)
- Pat McCarthy, Washington State Auditor (2017–present)

Organizations

- King County Democratic Party

Labor unions

- Washington AFL–CIO

Newspapers

- The Herald
- The News Tribune (co-endorsed with Anderson)
- The Seattle Times
- The Stranger
Julie Anderson (NP)

County officials

- Vicki Dalton, Spokane County auditor (Democrat)
- Greg Kimsey, Clark County auditor (Republican)

Organizations

- National Women's Political Caucus of Washington

Labor unions

- International Association of Fire Fighters Local 31

Newspapers

- The News Tribune (co-endorsed with Hobbs)
Keith Wagoner (R)

Statewide officials

- Ralph Munro, former Secretary of State of Washington (1981–2001)
- Sam Reed, former Secretary of State of Washington (2001–2013)

State legislators

- John Braun, Minority Leader of the Washington State Senate

Organizations

- King County Republican Party

=== Polling ===
Poll source	Date(s) administered	Sample size (Note: Key: A – all adults RV – registered voters LV – likely voters V – unclear)	Margin of error	Steve Hobbs (D)	Julie Anderson (NP)	Tamborine Borrelli (R)	Kurtis Engle (I)	Bob Hagglund (R)	Mark Miloscia (R)	Marquez Tiggs (D)	Keith Wagoner (R)	Undecided
Public Policy Polling (D) (Note: Poll sponsored by the Northwest Progressive Institute)	June 1–2, 2022	1,039 (LV)	± 3.0%	17%	5%	5%	1%	5%	2%	3%	6%	56%
Public Policy Polling (D)	February 17–18, 2022	700 (LV)	± 3.7%	33%	11%	–	–	–	–	–	30%	25%

=== Results ===
County results Hobbs: 20–30%; 30–40%; 40–50%; 50–60%; Wagoner: 20–30%; Hagglund: 20–30%; 30–40%

Congressional district results Hobbs: 20–30%; 30–40%; 40–50%; 50–60%; 60–70%

Blanket primary results
Party	Candidate	Votes	%
Democratic	Steve Hobbs (incumbent)	747,993	39.96%
Nonpartisan	Julie Anderson	240,035	12.82%
Republican	Keith Wagoner	227,842	12.17%
Republican	Bob Hagglund	225,633	12.06%
Republican	Mark Miloscia	187,774	10.03%
Democratic	Marquez Tiggs	148,716	7.95%
Republican	Tamborine Borrelli	86,748	4.63%
Unity	Kurtis Engle	6,887	0.37%
Total votes		1,871,628	100.00%

Counties that flipped from Republican to Democratic

- Clallam (largest city: Port Angeles)
- Island (largest city: Oak Harbor)
- Kitsap (largest city: Bremerton)
- Skagit (largest city: Mount Vernon)
- Snohomish (largest city: Everett)
- Thurston (largest city: Lacey)

==== By congressional district ====
District	Hobbs	Anderson	Wagoner	Hagglund	Miloscia	Tiggs	Representative
1st	47%	12%	11%	10%	9%	7%	Suzan DelBene
2nd	42%	13%	13%	12%	8%	8%	Rick Larsen
3rd	31%	11%	15%	15%	12%	9%	Jaime Herrera Beutler
4th	24%	10%	21%	18%	13%	6%	Dan Newhouse
5th	29%	10%	16%	18%	12%	7%	Cathy McMorris Rodgers
6th	37%	16%	11%	12%	10%	8%	Derek Kilmer
7th	67%	13%	3%	3%	3%	8%	Pramila Jayapal
8th	36%	12%	14%	15%	12%	7%	Kim Schrier
9th	50%	13%	6%	8%	11%	10%	Adam Smith
10th	36%	17%	11%	11%	12%	9%	Marilyn Strickland

== General election ==
=== Predictions ===
Source	Ranking	As of
Sabato's Crystal Ball	Leans D	November 3, 2022
Elections Daily	Leans D	November 7, 2022

=== Candidates ===
- Julie Anderson (nonpartisan), Pierce County Auditor
- Steve Hobbs (Democratic), incumbent Secretary of State
- Brad Klippert (Republican, write-in), state representative, candidate for U.S. Senate in 2004 and 2006, and candidate for Washington's 4th congressional district in 2022

=== Debates ===
A debate was scheduled for October 18 at the University of Puget Sound, but it was canceled.

2022 Washington Secretary of State special election debates
No.	Date	Host	Moderator	Link	Democratic	Nonpartisan
Key: P Participant A Absent N Not invited I Invited W Withdrawn						
Key: P Participant A Absent N Not invited I Invited W Withdrawn					Steve Hobbs	Julie Anderson
1	Aug. 17, 2022	Association of Washington Business	Melissa Santos	AWB	**P**	**P**
2	Oct. 23, 2022	KSPS; League of Women Voters of Washington; The Spokesman-Review; Washington Debate Coalition	Laurel Demkovitch	YouTube	**P**	**P**

=== Endorsements ===
Endorsements in bold were made after the primary election.

Steve Hobbs (D)

Federal officials

- **Maria Cantwell**, U.S. Senator from Washington (2001–present)

Statewide officials

- Bob Ferguson, Attorney General of Washington (2013–present)
- Gary Locke, 21st Governor of Washington (1997–2005)
- Pat McCarthy, Washington State Auditor (2017–present)

State legislators

- **Andy Billig**, Majority Leader of the Washington Senate

Local officials

- **Paddy McGuire**, Mason County auditor
- **Mary Hall**, Thurston County auditor

Organizations

- King County Democratic Party

Labor unions

- **International Association of Sheet Metal, Air, Rail and Transportation Workers Local 55 & 66**
- Washington AFL–CIO

Newspapers

- **The Columbian**
- The Herald
- The News Tribune (co-endorsed with Anderson)
- The Seattle Times
- The Stranger
Julie Anderson (NP)

U.S. Representatives

- Jaime Herrera Beutler, U.S. Representative for Washington's 3rd congressional district (2011–2023) (Republican)

Statewide officials

- **Dan Evans**, former Governor of Washington (1965–1977) (Republican)
- **Rob McKenna**, former Attorney General of Washington (2005–2013) (Republican)
- **Sam Reed**, former Secretary of State of Washington (2001–2013) (Republican)

State legislators

- T'wina Nobles, state senator (Democrat)
- Emily Wicks, state representative (Democrat)

Local officials

- Mike Crowley, former mayor of Tacoma (Republican)
- Vicki Dalton, Spokane County auditor (Democrat)
- **Reagan Dunn**, King County Councillor (Republican)
- Greg Kimsey, Clark County auditor (Republican)
- **Caroline Weikel**, former Snohomish County auditor
- Victoria Woodards, mayor of Tacoma (Democrat)
- **Nadine Woodward**, mayor of Spokane (Republican)

Organizations

- **National Women's Political Caucus**

Labor unions

- **International Association of Fire Fighters Local 31**

Newspapers

- The News Tribune (co-endorsed with Hobbs)
- **Tri-City Herald**
Brad Klippert (R, write-in)

Organizations

- **Washington State Republican Party**

=== Polling ===
Poll source	Date(s) administered	Sample size	Margin of error	Steve Hobbs (D)	Julie Anderson (NP)	Undecided
Public Policy Polling (D)	October 19–20, 2022	782 (LV)	± 3.5%	33%	**34%**	32%
SurveyUSA	October 14–19, 2022	589 (LV)	± 5.0%	**40%**	29%	30%
Strategies 360	September 22–25, 2022	500 (RV)	± 4.4%	35%	**36%**	29%
Strategies 360	September 22–25, 2022	370 (LV)	± 5.1%	**38%**	**38%**	24%
The Trafalgar Group (R)	September 21–24, 2022	1,091 (LV)	± 2.9%	**40%**	37%	23%
Elway Research	September 12–15, 2022	403 (LV)	± 3.0%	**31%**	29%	**40%**

=== Results ===
2022 Washington Secretary of State special election
Party	Candidate	Votes	%
**Democratic**	**Steve Hobbs (incumbent)**	**1,468,521**	**49.77%**
Nonpartisan	Julie Anderson	1,351,926	45.82%
Write-in		129,933	4.40%
Total votes		**2,950,380**	**100.00%**
Democratic **hold**			

==== By county ====
County results
County	Steve Hobbs Democratic		Julie Anderson Nonpartisan		Write-in Various		Margin		Total votes
County	#	%	#	%	#	%	#	%	Total votes
Adams	926	24.06%	**2,721**	**70.69%**	202	5.25%	-1,795	-46.64%	3,849
Asotin	2,863	33.27%	**5,545**	**64.43%**	198	2.30%	-2,682	-31.16%	8,606
Benton	22,626	30.95%	**40,978**	**56.05%**	9,500	13.00%	-18,352	-25.10%	73,104
Chelan	11,885	36.43%	**19,026**	**58.33%**	1,709	5.24%	-7,141	-21.89%	32,620
Clallam	18,111	45.93%	**19,685**	**49.92%**	1,638	4.15%	-1,574	-3.99%	39,434
Clark	91,758	46.03%	**97,354**	**48.84%**	10,224	5.13%	-5,596	-2.81%	199,336
Columbia	505	25.56%	**1,368**	**69.23%**	103	5.21%	-863	-43.67%	1,976
Cowlitz	15,239	35.28%	**25,730**	**59.57%**	2,223	5.15%	-10,491	-24.29%	43,192
Douglas	4,664	30.44%	**9,571**	**62.47%**	1,085	7.08%	-4,907	-32.03%	15,320
Ferry	927	28.87%	**1,876**	**58.42%**	408	12.71%	-949	-29.55%	3,211
Franklin	6,648	31.26%	**12,295**	**57.82%**	2,322	10.92%	-5,647	-26.55%	21,265
Garfield	319	27.64%	**810**	**70.19%**	25	2.17%	-491	-42.55%	1,154
Grant	6,740	26.66%	**17,579**	**69.54%**	959	3.79%	-10,839	-42.88%	25,278
Grays Harbor	12,185	42.56%	**15,115**	**52.80%**	1,328	4.64%	-2,930	-10.23%	28,628
Island	**20,368**	**48.81%**	19,833	47.52%	1,532	3.67%	535	1.28%	41,733
Jefferson	**12,487**	**60.91%**	7,455	36.37%	558	2.72%	5,032	24.55%	20,500
King	**563,207**	**65.14%**	282,355	32.66%	19,028	2.20%	280,852	32.48%	864,590
Kitsap	**59,424**	**49.64%**	55,697	46.52%	4,594	3.84%	3,727	3.11%	119,715
Kittitas	7,199	36.50%	**11,542**	**58.51%**	984	4.99%	-4,343	-22.02%	19,725
Klickitat	4,169	38.37%	**6,156**	**56.66%**	539	4.96%	-1,987	-18.29%	10,864
Lewis	9,560	27.92%	**21,643**	**63.21%**	3,036	8.87%	-12,083	-35.29%	34,239
Lincoln	1,328	23.21%	**3,899**	**68.14%**	495	8.65%	-2,571	-44.93%	5,722
Mason	11,721	41.04%	**15,601**	**54.62%**	1,239	4.34%	-3,880	-13.58%	28,561
Okanogan	5,757	36.77%	**8,862**	**56.60%**	1,037	6.62%	-3,105	-19.83%	15,656
Pacific	4,941	43.66%	**6,155**	**54.39%**	221	1.95%	-1,214	-10.73%	11,317
Pend Oreille	1,772	27.42%	**4,339**	**67.15%**	351	5.43%	-2,567	-39.72%	6,462
Pierce	133,819	41.36%	**175,492**	**54.24%**	14,248	4.40%	-41,673	-12.88%	323,559
San Juan	**6,800**	**62.45%**	3,433	31.53%	656	6.02%	3,367	30.92%	10,889
Skagit	24,604	44.59%	**26,492**	**48.01%**	4,086	7.40%	-1,888	-3.42%	55,182
Skamania	2,219	37.51%	**3,287**	**55.56%**	410	6.93%	-1,068	-18.05%	5,916
Snohomish	**161,102**	**51.38%**	140,031	44.66%	12,427	3.96%	21,071	6.72%	313,560
Spokane	87,052	40.86%	**113,591**	**53.32%**	12,381	5.81%	-26,539	-12.46%	213,024
Stevens	5,350	24.90%	**13,262**	**61.72%**	2,874	13.38%	-7,912	-36.82%	21,486
Thurston	**59,871**	**48.58%**	59,749	48.48%	3,622	2.94%	122	0.10%	123,242
Wahkiakum	886	36.61%	**1,451**	**59.96%**	83	3.43%	-565	-23.35%	2,420
Walla Walla	8,934	38.85%	**12,847**	**55.87%**	1,213	5.28%	-3,913	-17.02%	22,994
Whatcom	**53,022**	**49.62%**	45,671	42.74%	8,153	7.63%	7,351	6.88%	106,846
Whitman	6,681	44.63%	**7,863**	**52.53%**	426	2.85%	-1,182	-7.90%	14,970
Yakima	20,852	34.62%	**35,567**	**59.05%**	3,816	6.34%	-14,715	-24.43%	60,235
Totals	1,468,521	49.77%	1,351,926	45.82%	129,933	4.40%	116,595	3.95%	2,950,380

==== By congressional district ====
Despite losing the state, Anderson won six of ten congressional districts, including four that elected Democrats and two that elected Republicans.

District	Hobbs	Anderson	Representative
1st	**55%**	41%	Suzan DelBene
2nd	**51%**	43%	Rick Larsen
3rd	42%	**53%**	Jaime Herrera Beutler (117th Congress)
3rd	42%	**53%**	Marie Gluesenkamp Perez (118th Congress)
4th	32%	**59%**	Dan Newhouse
5th	38%	**55%**	Cathy McMorris Rodgers
6th	47%	**49%**	Derek Kilmer
7th	**75%**	24%	Pramila Jayapal
8th	44%	**51%**	Kim Schrier
9th	**62%**	35%	Adam Smith
10th	46%	**50%**	Marilyn Strickland

== Notes ==
Partisan clients
