= Art Broback =

American politician (1931–2019)

Member of the Washington House of Representatives from the 28th district
- In office January 14, 1991 – January 11, 1993
- Preceded by: Sally W. Walker
- Succeeded by: Stan Flemming
- In office January 10, 1983 – January 14, 1985
- Preceded by: Shirley Winsley
- Succeeded by: Shirley Winsley

Personal details
- Born: Arthur John Broback; February 2, 1931 Tacoma, Washington, U.S.
- Died: April 10, 2019 (aged 88) Gig Harbor, Washington, U.S.
- Party: Republican

Arthur John Broback (February 2, 1931 – April 10, 2019) was an American politician who served in the Washington House of Representatives from 1983 to 1985 and from 1991 to 1993.

He died on April 10, 2019, in Gig Harbor, Washington at age 88.
