= 2020 Washington elections =

2020 Washington Statewide Executive Offices elections
- November 3, 2020

All statewide executive offices
	Majority party	Minority party
Party	Democratic	Republican
Last election	7	2
Seats won	8	1
Seat change	▲1	▼1
Percentage	58.23%	39.28%
Swing	▲4.56%	▼3.14%

General elections were held in the U.S. state of Washington on November 3, 2020. A primary was held on August 4.

== Federal ==
=== President of the United States ===
Washington has 12 electoral votes for the presidential election, remaining unchanged from 2016. A presidential primary for both parties was held on March 10, 2020, with 13 candidates for the Democrats and one candidate for the Republicans. The 2020 Democratic primary was the first in the state's history to have a binding vote, replacing the caucus system that overrode the nonbinding primary vote.

=== United States House of Representatives ===
All 10 of Washington's seats in the United States House of Representatives were up for re-election. All but one of the incumbents ran for re-election, the exception being Denny Heck (D) of the 10th district.

== Statewide executive ==
=== Governor ===
Incumbent governor Jay Inslee (D) was re-elected to a third term in a landslide.

=== Lieutenant governor ===
Incumbent lieutenant governor Cyrus Habib (D) retired from politics. U.S. Representative Denny Heck won the open seat.

=== Attorney general ===
Incumbent attorney general Bob Ferguson (D) was re-elected to a third term.

2020 Washington Attorney General election
Primary election
Party	Candidate	Votes	%
Democratic	Bob Ferguson (incumbent)	1,356,225	55.8
Republican	Matt Larkin	575,470	23.7
Republican	Brett Rogers	296,843	12.2
Republican	Mike Vaska	199,826	8.2
Write-in		2,372	0.1
Total votes		2,430,736	100.0
General election
Democratic	Bob Ferguson (incumbent)	2,226,418	56.4
Republican	Matt Larkin	1,714,927	43.5
Write-in		3,968	0.1
Total votes		3,945,313	100.0
Democratic hold			

=== Secretary of state ===
Incumbent secretary of state Kim Wyman (R) was re-elected to a third term. State Representative Gael Tarleton (D–Seattle) unsuccessfully challenged Wyman.

2020 Washington Secretary of State election
Primary election
Party	Candidate	Votes	%
Republican	Kim Wyman (incumbent)	1,238,455	50.9
Democratic	Gael Tarleton	1,053,584	43.3
Independent	Ed Minger	87,982	3.6
Washington Progressive Party	Gentry Lange	51,826	2.1
Write-in		1,919	0.1
Total votes		2,433,766	100.0
General election
Republican	Kim Wyman (incumbent)	2,116,141	53.6
Democratic	Gael Tarleton	1,826,710	46.3
Write-in		4,666	0.1
Total votes		3,947,517	100.0
Republican hold			

=== Public Lands Commissioner ===
Incumbent Public Lands Commissioner Hilary Franz (D) was re-elected to a second term. She defeated Republican nominee Sue Kuehl Pederson in the general election by 13.5%.

2020 Washington Commissioner of Public Lands election
Primary election
Party	Candidate	Votes	%
Democratic	Hilary Franz (incumbent)	1,211,310	51.1
Republican	Sue Kuehl Pederson	554,147	23.4
Republican	Cameron Whitney	197,610	8.3
Republican	Steve Sharon	179,714	7.6
Democratic	Frank Wallbrown	122,136	5.2
Libertarian	Kelsey Reyes	77,407	3.3
Republican	Maryam Abasbarzy	24,189	1.0
Write-in		2,504	0.1
Total votes		2,369,017	100.0
General election
Democratic	Hilary Franz (incumbent)	2,212,158	56.7
Republican	Sue Kuehl Pederson	1,686,320	43.2
Write-in		3,799	0.1
Total votes		3,902,277	100.0
Democratic hold			

=== State auditor ===
Incumbent state auditor Pat McCarthy (D) was re-elected to a second term.

2020 Washington State Auditor election
Primary election
Party	Candidate	Votes	%
Democratic	Pat McCarthy (incumbent)	1,134,077	47.4
Republican	Chris Leyba	982,411	41.1
Democratic	Joshua Casey	273,198	11.4
Write-in		2,278	0.1
Total votes		2,391,964	100.0
General election
Democratic	Pat McCarthy (incumbent)	2,260,830	58.0
Republican	Chris Leyba	1,633,956	41.9
Write-in		3,316	0.1
Total votes		3,898,102	100.0
Democratic hold			

=== State treasurer ===
Incumbent state treasurer Duane Davidson (R) ran for a second term. State Representative Mike Pellicciotti (D–Federal Way) defeated Davidson.

2020 Washington State Treasurer election
Primary election
Party	Candidate	Votes	%
Democratic	Mike Pellicciotti	1,279,452	53.2
Republican	Duane Davidson (incumbent)	1,121,885	46.7
Write-in		2,604	0.1
Total votes		2,403,941	100.0
General election
Democratic	Mike Pellicciotti	2,089,159	53.4
Republican	Duane Davidson (incumbent)	1,818,895	46.5
Write-in		3,339	0.1
Total votes		3,911,393	100.0
Democratic gain from Republican			

=== Superintendent of Public Instruction ===
Incumbent state superintendent Chris Reykdal (non-partisan election) was re-elected to a second term.

2020 Superintendent of Public Instruction election
Primary election
Party	Candidate	Votes	%
Nonpartisan	Chris Reykdal (incumbent)	898,951	40.2
Nonpartisan	Maia Espinoza	564,674	25.3
Nonpartisan	Ron Higgins	456,879	20.5
Nonpartisan	Dennis Wick	121,425	5.4
Nonpartisan	David Spring	111,176	5.0
Nonpartisan	Stan Lippmann	71,395	3.2
Write-in		9,571	0.4
Total votes		2,234,071	100.0
General election
Nonpartisan	Chris Reykdal (incumbent)	1,955,365	54.6
Nonpartisan	Maia Espinoza	1,609,643	44.9
Write-in		17,957	0.5
Total votes		3,582,965	100.0
Democratic hold			

=== Insurance Commissioner ===
Incumbent insurance commissioner Mike Kreidler (D) was re-elected to a sixth term. With over 65% of the vote, Kreidler had the best performance of any statewide candidate in this cycle.

2020 Washington Insurance Commissioner election
Primary election
Party	Candidate	Votes	%
Democratic	Mike Kreidler (incumbent)	1,402,650	59.0
Republican	Chirayu Avinash Patel	644,446	27.1
Libertarian	Anthony Welti	324,921	13.7
Write-in		4,220	0.2
Total votes		2,376,237	100.0
General election
Democratic	Mike Kreidler (incumbent)	2,506,693	65.4
Republican	Chirayu Avinash Patel	1,308,292	34.1
Write-in		18,576	0.5
Total votes		3,833,561	100.0
Democratic hold			

== Supreme Court ==
Seats 3, 4, and 7 of the Washington Supreme Court were up for six-year terms. Debra L. Stephens, Charles W. Johnson, and Raquel Montoya-Lewis ran for new terms. Seat 6 Justice Charles Wiggins retired and Governor Inslee's appointee G. Helen Whitener ran for the final two years of the term.

=== Position 3 ===
==== Polling ====
Poll source	Date(s) administered	Sample size (Note: Key: A – all adults RV – registered voters LV – likely voters V – unclear)	Margin of error	Raquel Montoya-Lewis	David Larson	Undecided
Public Policy Polling (D)	October 14–15, 2020	610 (LV)	± 4%	21%	17%	62%
Public Policy Polling (D)	May 19–20, 2020	1,070 (LV)	± 3%	14%	8%	78%

==== Results ====
2020 Washington Supreme Court Position 3 election
Party	Candidate	Votes	%
Nonpartisan	Raquel Montoya-Lewis (incumbent)	2,057,623	58.22%
Nonpartisan	Dave Larson	1,462,764	41.39%
Write-in		13,661	0.39%
Total votes		3,534,048	100.00%

=== Position 4 ===
==== Results ====
2020 Washington Supreme Court Position 4 election
Party	Candidate	Votes	%
Nonpartisan	Charles W. Johnson (incumbent)	2,850,924	97.72%
Write-in		66,407	2.28%
Total votes		2,917,331	100.00%

=== Position 6 ===
==== Polling ====
Poll source	Date(s) administered	Sample size	Margin of error	G. Helen Whitener	Richard S. Serns	Undecided
Public Policy Polling (D)	October 14–15, 2020	610 (LV)	± 4%	22%	12%	66%
Public Policy Polling (D)	May 19–20, 2020	1,070 (LV)	± 3%	13%	6%	81%

==== Results ====
2020 Washington Supreme Court Position 6 election
Party	Candidate	Votes	%
Nonpartisan	G. Helen Whitener (incumbent)	2,263,513	66.12%
Nonpartisan	Richard S. Serns	1,140,338	33.31%
Write-in		19,416	0.57%
Total votes		3,423,267	100.00%

=== Position 7 ===
==== Results ====
2020 Washington Supreme Court Position 7 election
Party	Candidate	Votes	%
Nonpartisan	Debra L. Stephens (incumbent)	2,852,879	97.91%
Write-in		60,808	2.09%
Total votes		2,913,687	100.00%

== Legislative ==
=== State senate ===
Twenty-five of the forty-nine seats in the Washington State Senate were up for election. Democrats kept a 28–21 majority in the Senate. Senators retiring this election were Senators Randi Becker (R-Olympia), Maureen Walsh (R-Walla Walla), and Hans Zeiger (R-Puyallup). Senators Dean Takko (D) and Steve O'Ban (R) lost reelection.

=== State House of Representatives ===
All 98 seats in the Washington House of Representatives were up for election. Democrats kept a 57–41 majority in the House. House members who didn't run for re-election were Representatives Sherry Appleton (D-Poulsbo), Richard DeBolt (R-Chehalis), Beth Doglio (D-Olympia), Chris Gildon (R-Puyallup), Bill Jenkin (R-Prosser), Christine Kilduff (D-University Place), Mike Pellicciotti (D-Federal Way), Eric Pettigrew (D-Seattle), Norma Smith (R-Clinton), and Gael Tarleton (D-Seattle). Representatives Luanne Van Werven (R) and Brian Blake (D) lost reelection.

== Ballot measures ==
No initiatives to the people qualified for the ballot. One referendum was on the ballot, on Senate Bill 5395 regarding sexual education. It passed with 58% in favor. One constitutional amendment was on the ballot, regarding the Family and Medical Leave Insurance Account and the Long-Term Care Services and Supports Trust Account. It failed with 54% against.

== See also ==
- Elections in Washington (state)
