= Dick Muri =

American politician from Washington

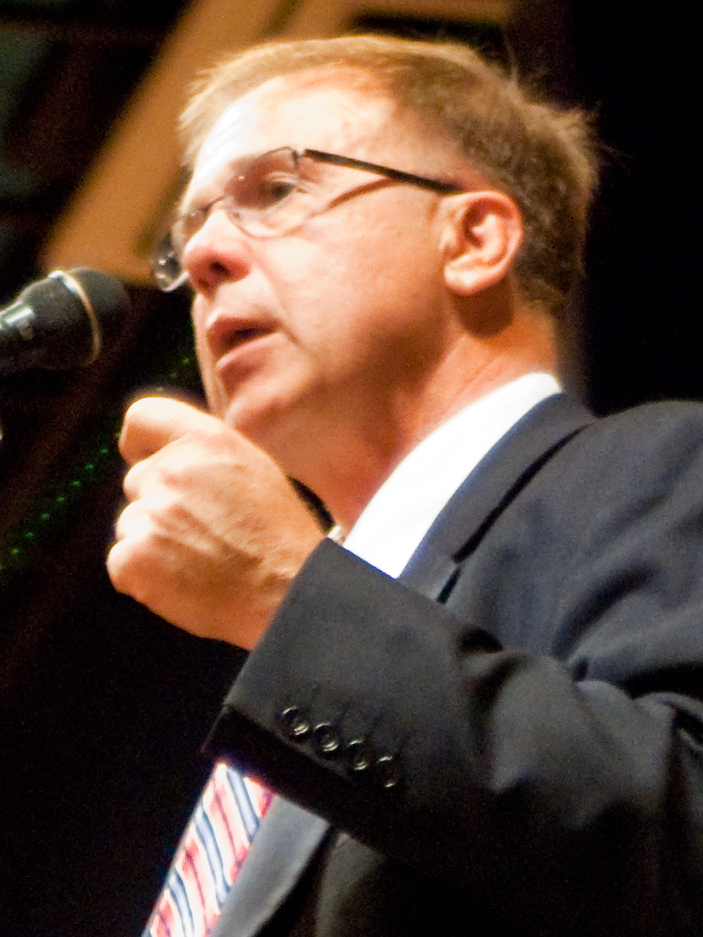
- Speech at Pierce County Kickoff

Mayor of Steilacoom, Washington
- Incumbent
- Assumed office April 7, 2021
- Preceded by: Ron Lucas

Member of the Washington House of Representatives from the 28th district
- In office July 3, 2013 – January 14, 2019
- Preceded by: Steve O'Ban
- Succeeded by: Mari Leavitt

Member of the Pierce County Council from the 6th District
- In office November 19, 2003 – December 31, 2012
- Preceded by: Paul A. Bocchi
- Succeeded by: Douglas G. Richardson

Personal details
- Born: Richard Walter Muri; November 30, 1953 (age 72) Fairbanks, Alaska, U.S.
- Party: Republican
- Spouse: Mary L. (Burns) Muri
- Education: University of Massachusetts Amherst (BS); Golden Gate University (MPA)
- Website: Official

Military service
- Allegiance: United States
- Branch/service: United States Air Force
- Years of service: 1975 – 1997 (22 years)
- Rank: Lieutenant colonel

Richard Walter Muri (born November 30, 1953) is an American politician. He is the appointed Mayor of the Town of Steilacoom after longtime Mayor Ron Lucas stepped down for health reasons in March 2021. He is a Republican former member of the Washington House of Representatives, representing the 28th legislative district. Muri was appointed to the Washington State House of Representatives following (now former) State Representative Steve O'Ban's appointment to the Washington State Senate after State Senator Mike Carrell's death. From 2003 to 2012, he served as a Republican member of the Pierce County Council, representing the 6th District. In 2010, he ran as a Republican candidate for U.S. Congress in Washington's 9th congressional district against incumbent Democratic Congressman Adam Smith, eventually losing to Smith by nearly 10 points. In 2012, he again ran, this time in Washington's 10th congressional district against Denny Heck, losing by 17 points.

Muri, a Gulf War veteran, served 22 years in the United States Air Force. He and his wife are residents of Steilacoom, Washington.

== Personal life and career ==
=== Life and family ===
Town of Steilacoom Mayor Richard "Dick" Walter Muri was born November 30, 1953, in Fairbanks, Alaska. He graduated from Ashland High School in Ashland, Massachusetts in 1971 and received his Bachelor of Science in Environmental Health from the University of Massachusetts Amherst, 1975 and his Masters of Public Administration from Golden Gate University in 1988.

Dick has been married since 1979 to Mary Muri (formerly Mary Burns - Lakes HS '75) and has four children and twelve grandchildren.

=== Military service ===
Dick was commissioned via ROTC at UMass Amherst as an officer in the United States Air Force in 1975. He earned his navigator wings at Mather Air Force Base in 1976 and flew the C-141 Starlifter at McChord Air Force Base as a Navigator in the 8th Military Airlift Squadron (MAS) from 1977 to 1985 and as a member of the 36th Airlift Squadron (AS) from 1991 to 1993. Muri was also assigned to the 62nd Airlift Wing as an Airlift Control Element (ALCE) Operations Officer and a Tactical Airlift Liaison Officer (TALO) from 1982 to 1984. Muri served at Travis Air Force Base from 1984 to 1989 as a member of the 22nd Air Force Staff and a member of the 1702 Mobility Support Squadron. Muri was a member of the Airlift Control Center (ALCC) Cadre and as a manager of the 22nd Air Force area TALOs.

Muri served in the Gulf War from 1990 to 1991 as Director of Airlift Operations of the 628th Military Airlift Support Squadron at Incirlik Airbase, Turkey. As Director of Airlift Operations he initially directed the critical Operation Provide Comfort for the first 48 hours. Initially for the first 48 hours, Operation Provide Comfort was commanded by the local 628th Military Airlift Support Squadron Major Richard (Dick) Muri (acting commander), who after being alerted at 2 AM by the 39th TACG Command Post, with orders from President Bush to drop supplies to the Kurds within 24 hours. Major Muri immediately put two aircrews on Alpha alert, food was procured from the local commissary with squadron funds (later reimbursed), and CDS bundles were ordered from USAFE. That afternoon, 16 CDS bundles with food supplies were air dropped by C-130s in an area with Kurdish refugees. Two days later, Lieutenant General John Shalikashvili took command and said to Major Muri at a command post conference meeting, "Major, you have done good, take care of your squadron".

From 1992 to 1997, Muri was Chief of Quality Management for McChord Air Force Base, directing a program that won numerous awards for excellence from the United States Air Force and Washington state. He retired as a Lt. Colonel with 22 years military experience on 1 January 1998.

=== Governmental leadership ===
Dick Muri took office as Pierce County Councilmember District 6 on November 19, 2003, serving Lakewood, Steilacoom, DuPont, Roy, McKenna, Fort Lewis, McChord AFB, and the island communities of Anderson, McNeil, and Ketron.

Muri served in leadership positions as Chair of the Performance Audit Committee, Vice-chair of both the Tacoma-Pierce County Health Board and Select Committee for Emergency Preparedness, and co-chair of the Criminal Justice Task Force.

Muri was a member of the following county council standing committees: Community Development, Economic Infrastructure & Development, and Public Safety & Human Services.

External Boards and Commissions include the Joint City-Council Open Space Determination Board, Law and Justice Community Oversight Committee, Pierce County Reserve Officers Board of Trustees, Pierce Transit Board, Rainier Communications Commission, Zoo & Trek Authority (ZTA), Safe Streets, and Pierce County Law and Justice Council. Muri ran for his second term for Pierce County Councilmember District 6, promising to continue being the most accessible elected official for the council, and offering a strong record of open, efficient, and responsible County government.

As chairman of the Performance Audit Committee, Muri worked with the Justice Management Institution to improve the processes involved in the Pierce County judicial system.

As a Councilmember, Muri was committed to supporting veterans and protecting their 50,000 family wage jobs at Joint Base Lewis McChord. He is also heavily involved with conservation and land preservation projects around the district, such as protecting the undeveloped 18-acre (73,000 m^{2}) Salter's Point woods in Steilacoom and expanding Lakewood's Wards Lake Park.

=== Community service ===
Muri received the Tacoma-Pierce County Chamber of Commerce John H. Anderson Military Citizen of the Year Award for 1996 and was inducted into the Fort Lewis Civilian Hall of Fame in a ceremony at Fort Lewis in January 2006. Other community recognition includes the 2002 Washington State District Three Middle School Wrestling Coach of the Year Award. He was inducted into the National Wrestling Hall of Fame in 2017. He was selected out of 330 National Drive Electric Week "City Captains" as City Captain of the Year in 2018 by Plug In America. In 2019 Muri was selected by the Steilacoom Kiwanis and Chamber of Commerce as the Steilacoom Citizen of the Year.

A Charter member of the Kiwanis Club of Steilacoom in 1993. He is Past President of the Steilacoom Kiwanis Club - a community partner with the 42nd Military Police Brigade at Fort Lewis; a former member of the Steilacoom Historical School District #1 Board of Directors (1997 to 2004); Pierce County Council District # 6 2003 - 2012, 28th District State Representative Position # 1 2013 - 2018, co-founder and Director of the Steilacoom Lakewood Youth Wrestling Association (1991 to 2005); past member of Bates Management Training Center Board of Directors; and active member of many local Veteran organizations.

== Congressional Campaigns ==
Muri challenged Democratic incumbent Adam Smith for Washington's 9th congressional district. Smith defeated Muri 55% to 45% to remain in office.

In 2012 Muri ran again for Congress, this time in the newly created 10th Congressional District.

Muri was defeated in his bid to become the district's first congressman by former state legislator Denny Heck 58.6% to 41.4%.

== Washington State House of Representatives ==
=== Appointment ===
On May 29, 2013, longtime state legislator Senator Mike Carrell died from complications with myelodysplastic syndrome. On June 5, 2013, Representative Steve O'Ban was appointed by the Pierce County Council to fill the vacant seat in the State Senate.

On July 3, 2013, Muri was unanimously appointed by the Pierce County Council to fill the seat vacated by O'Ban.

=== Legislative Campaigns ===
2014

Muri ran to retain his seat against Democratic challenger Mary Moss. Muri prevailed 57.8% to 42.2%.

=== Tenure ===
In 2018 Muri served as the assistant ranking member of the State of Washington House of Representatives Education Committee and assistant ranking member of the House Judiciary. Muri is also a former member of the House Early Learning and Human Services Committee.

== Awards ==
- 2014 Guardians of Small Business award. Presented by NFIB.
