= Sally W. Walker =

Washington State politician

Member of the Washington House of Representatives from the 28th district
- In office January 14, 1985 – September 28, 1990
- Preceded by: Stanley C. Johnson
- Succeeded by: Art Broback

Personal details
- Born: February 5, 1929 Wilmette, Illinois, U.S.
- Died: August 19, 2004 (aged 75) University Place, Washington, U.S.
- Party: Republican
- Education: William Jewell College (attended)

Sally W. Walker (February 5, 1929 – August 19, 2004) was an American politician who served as a member of the Washington House of Representatives from 1985 to 1990. She represented Washington's 28th legislative district as a Republican, serving as the Republican Caucus Vice Chair in 1989. She resigned on September 28, 1990.
