= Susan Sumner =

Washington State politician

Susan Casey Sumner

Member of the Washington Senate from the 28th district
- In office February 12, 1992 (appointed) – January 11, 1993
- Preceded by: Stanley C. Johnson
- Succeeded by: Shirley Winsley

Personal details
- Born: 1958 (age 67–68) Pennsylvania, U.S.
- Party: Republican
- Occupation: Communications Specialist

Susan Casey Sumner (born 1958) is a former American politician who served as a member of the Washington State Senate from 1992 to 1993. She represented Washington's 28th legislative district as a Republican. She was appointed on February 12, 1992, to serve the unexpired term of Stanley C. Johnson, serving until the seat was taken over by Shirley Winsley, who won election to the seat that November.
