= P. J. Gallagher (politician) =

American politician from Washington

P. J. (Jim) Gallagher
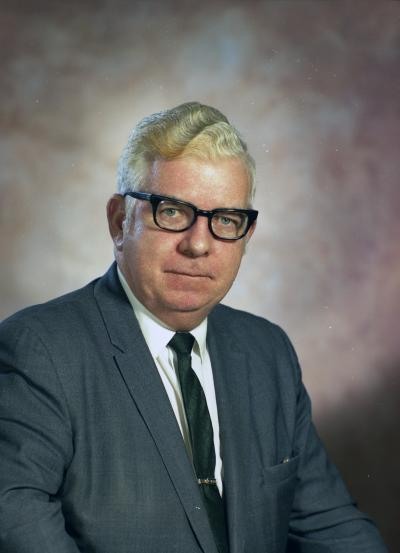
- P.J. Gallagher in 1971

Member of the Washington House of Representatives from the 29th district
- In office 1961–1991
- Succeeded by: Rosa Franklin

Member of the Washington House of Representatives from the 28th district
- In office 1961–1967

Personal details
- Born: June 28, 1915 Taylor, Washington, United States
- Died: October 27, 1991 (aged 76) Tacoma, Washington, United States
- Party: Democratic

Patrick James Gallagher (June 28, 1915 – October 27, 1991) was an American politician in the state of Washington. He served in the Washington House of Representatives from 1961 to 1991.
