= Shirley Winsley =

American politician (born 1934)

President pro tempore of the Washington Senate
- In office January 13, 2003 – June 30, 2004
- Preceded by: Rosa Franklin
- Succeeded by: Rosa Franklin

Member of the Washington Senate from the 28th district
- In office January 11, 1993 – June 30, 2004
- Preceded by: Susan Sumner
- Succeeded by: Mike Carrell

Member of the Washington House of Representatives from the 28th district
- In office January 14, 1985 – January 11, 1993
- Preceded by: Art Broback
- Succeeded by: Gigi Talcott
- In office January 10, 1977 – January 10, 1983
- Preceded by: Helmut L. Jueling
- Succeeded by: Art Broback
- In office April 12, 1974 – January 13, 1975
- Preceded by: Richard J. Kelley
- Succeeded by: Ted Haley

Member of the Pierce County Council from the 6th District
- In office May 1, 1981 – January 1, 1985
- Preceded by: Constituency established
- Succeeded by: Charles F. "Chuck" Gorden

Personal details
- Born: June 9, 1934 (age 92) Fosston, Minnesota, U.S.
- Party: Republican (1976–present)
- Other political affiliations: Democratic (before 1976)

Shirley J. Winsley (born June 9, 1934) is an American politician who served in the Washington House of Representatives from the 28th district from 1974 to 1975, from 1977 to 1983, and from 1985 to 1993, and in the Washington State Senate, representing the 28th district from 1993 to 2004.

Washington State Senate
Preceded by Rosa Franklin	President pro tempore of the Washington Senate; 2003–2004	Succeeded by Rosa Franklin
