= Beverley Vozenilek =

Washington State politician

Member of the Washington Senate from the 28th district
- In office August 2, 1979 – November 30, 1979
- Preceded by: Charles Newschwander
- Succeeded by: Ted Haley

Personal details
- Party: Republican

Beverley Vozenilek is a former American politician who served as a member of the Washington State Senate representing Washington's 28th legislative district as a Republican. She was appointed to the Senate after Charles Newschwander resigned following his appointment to the Board of Tax Appeals. She was sworn in on August 2, 1979. She served until November 30, when she was succeeded by Ted Haley after he won a special election to fill the rest of Newschwander's term.
