= Gigi Talcott =

American politician (born 1944)

Member of the Washington House of Representatives from the 28th district
- In office January 11, 1993 – January 8, 2007
- Preceded by: Shirley Winsley
- Succeeded by: Troy Kelley

Personal details
- Born: December 14, 1944 (age 81) California
- Party: Republican

Georganne "Gigi" Talcott (born December 14, 1944) is an American politician who served in the Washington House of Representatives from the 28th district from 1993 to 2007.
