= Rosa Franklin =

American politician

President pro tempore of the Washington Senate
- In office June 30, 2004 – January 10, 2011
- Preceded by: Shirley Winsley
- Succeeded by: Margarita Prentice
- In office January 8, 2001 – January 13, 2003
- Preceded by: R. Lorraine Wojahn
- Succeeded by: Shirley Winsley

Member of the Washington Senate from the 29th district
- In office January 25, 1993 – January 10, 2011
- Preceded by: A. L. Rasmussen
- Succeeded by: Steve Conway

Member of the Washington House of Representatives from the 29th district
- In office January 14, 1991 – January 25, 1993
- Preceded by: P. J. Gallagher
- Succeeded by: Steve Conway

Personal details
- Born: Rosa Lee Gourdine; April 4, 1927 (age 99) Moncks Corner, South Carolina, U.S.
- Party: Democratic
- Spouse: James Franklin
- Children: 3
- Education: University of Puget Sound (BA); Pacific Lutheran University (MA)

Rosa Lee Franklin (née Gourdine; born April 4, 1927) is an American politician and nurse who served as a member of the Washington State Senate from 1993 to 2011, representing the 29th District. She also served as the President Pro Tempore for the Senate.

== Early life and education ==
Franklin was born Rosa Lee Gourdine on April 4, 1927, the fifth child born to Henrietta Bryant and James Edwin Gourdine. She was born in a house built by her father in Cordesville, an unincorporated community in Berkeley County, South Carolina, historically known for Moncks Corner, South Carolina. The youngest of 12 children, she was raised by her aunt and uncle in Georgetown, South Carolina. After graduating high school, Franklin studied nursing at the Good Samaritan-Waverly Hospital School of Nursing in Columbia, South Carolina. She later worked at a state hospital in New Jersey and at the Brooklyn Jewish Hospital and Medical Center in New York City. Franklin moved to Germany with her husband, James Franklin, a member of the military. They eventually relocated to Tacoma, Washington.

After settling in Tacoma, Franklin earned a Bachelor of Arts degree in Biology and English from the University of Puget Sound. She then earned a Master of Arts in social sciences and human relations from Pacific Lutheran University in Lakewood, Washington. She also holds a women's Health Care Specialist Certificate from the University of Washington Gynecorp Training Program. She was later awarded an honorary doctorate from the University of Puget Sound.

== Career ==
Franklin worked as a registered nurse before becoming an elected representative.

In 1972, Franklin ran for a seat on the Tacoma City Council. Despite losing, she remained active in local politics and served as a Precinct Committee Officer for the Democratic Party and as a member of the League of Women Voters. She was a Washington delegate to the Democratic National Convention in 1976, 1988, and 2008.

Franklin was elected to the Washington House of Representatives in 1990 to represent the 29th District, and she won re-election in November 1992. After the state senator from the 29th district died in January 1993, Franklin was nominated as his successor.

== Personal life ==
Franklin and her husband James have been married for sixty-two years and have three children and five grandchildren.

== See also ==
- Washington State Legislature

Washington State Senate
| Preceded by Shirley Winsley | President pro tempore of the Washington Senate; 2004–2011 | Succeeded by Margarita Prentice |
