= Helen Whitener =

American judge (born 1964)

Justice of the Washington Supreme Court
- Incumbent
- Assumed office April 24, 2020
- Appointed by: Jay Inslee
- Preceded by: Charles K. Wiggins

Personal details
- Born: Grace Helen Whitener; 1964 (age 61–62) Trinidad and Tobago
- Spouse: Lynn Rainey
- Education: Baruch College (BBA); Seattle University (JD)

Grace Helen Whitener (born 1964), known professionally as G. Helen Whitener, is a Trinidadian-American attorney serving as an associate justice of the Washington Supreme Court. Whitener was nominated by Governor Jay Inslee on April 13, 2020, to fill the seat of retiring justice Charles K. Wiggins.

== Early life and education ==
Whitener was born and raised in Trinidad. She moved to the United States when she was 16 to receive medical care. She earned a Bachelor of Business Administration degree in international marketing and trade from Baruch College, followed by a Juris Doctor from the Seattle University School of Law.

== Legal Career ==
After graduating from law school, Whitener worked as a public defender, prosecutor, and private defense attorney.

She served as a judge on the Board of Industrial Insurance Appeals for two years and then as a pro-temp judge on Pierce County District Court as well as on the Pierce County Superior Court from 2015 to 2020, having been appointed by Governor Inslee and elected unopposed in 2015 and 2016.

On April 13, 2020, she was appointed to the Washington Supreme Court by Governor Jay Inslee. She successfully ran for election in 2020 for the remaining two years of Wiggins's term, winning 66% of the vote. Outside of strictly judicial positions, Justice Whitener has served as the co-chair of the Minority and Justice Commission since 2018, the co-chair of the Supreme Court's Disability and Justice Task Force in 2022, and is chair of the state's Annual Judicial Conference Committee. She is also a member of the International Association of Women Judges, the American Judges Association, Washington Women Lawyers, and the Advisory Council of the QLaw Association of Washington.

State v. Jackson (2020)

State v. Jackson was a decision regarding the 5th amendment and the due process clause in regards to inmates being unconstitutionally shackled in court, and in which Justice Whitener wrote the opinion for the case. The case ultimately sides with the Defendant John Jackson Sr., that his due process rights had been violated by being forced to be shackled in court without an “individualized inquiry" for needing such shackles. The decision upheld the decision from the Court of Appeals that “the shackling of Jackson without an individualized inquiry into whether shackles were necessary violated his constitutional rights.” Whitener and the other Washington Supreme Court Justices also found that “this violation was harmless beyond a reasonable doubt, leaving Jackson with a constitutional violation without a remedy.” and they reversed the Court of Appeals “holding that this violation was harmless." The rest of the justices on the supreme court concurred with the decision, and a new trial was set for Jackson.

== Honors & Awards ==
Justice Whitener has a long list of awards that she has won over the course of her career. Justice Whitener received her first major award in 2018 with the Pierce County Washington Women Lawyers Women of the Year Award, and the following year she received the Washington State Bar Association's Charles Z. Smith Excellence in Diversity & Inclusion Award as well the King County Washington Women Lawyers President Award, Seattle University’s School of Law and Women's Law Caucus Woman of the Year Award. In 2020, she received the International Association of LGBTQ+ Judges' Presidents Award and was named as a Distinguished 400 Awardee by the 400 Years of African American History Commission. That year she would also gain the Washington Women Lawyers Chief Justice Mary Fairhurst Passing the Torch Award. In 2021 she would be “recognized as Public Official of the Year by The Evergreen State College's Master of Public Administration Program, and she also received Judge of the Year from The Western Region of the National Black Law Students Association” and in 2022 the University of Puget Sound would grant her an Honorary Law Degree from their law school as well as receiving the American Bar Association Stonewall Award. In 2025 Whitner would receive the “Anshel Ma'asehi Award of Distinction from the Cardozo Society of Washington State.”

== Personal life ==
She is the first African-American, LGBTQ judge in Washington and second African-American member of the Washington Supreme Court after Charles Z. Smith, as well as the fourth immigrant-born justice in the state She is disabled, having a hereditary degenerative back condition that she had reconstructive back surgery for in 2023. Whitener is co-chair of the Washington State Minority and Justice Commission and the Disability Justice Task Force.

Whitener is married to Lynn Rainey, a fellow graduate of the Seattle University School of Law and an LGBTQ activist. Rainy was a part of the U.S. Army medical Service until 2004 where she would go on to obtain her legal degree from Seattle University a few years later in 2007.

== See also ==
- List of African-American jurists
- List of LGBT jurists in the United States
- List of LGBT state supreme court justices in the United States
- List of first women lawyers and judges in Washington

Legal offices
Preceded by Charles K. Wiggins	Justice of the Washington Supreme Court; 2020–present	Incumbent
