= Mike Carrell =

American politician

Member of the Washington Senate from the 28th district
- In office July 6, 2004 – May 29, 2013
- Preceded by: Shirley Winsley
- Succeeded by: Steve O'Ban

Member of the Washington House of Representatives from the 28th district
- In office January 9, 1995 – July 6, 2004
- Preceded by: Stanley Flemming
- Succeeded by: Bob Lawrence

Personal details
- Born: April 10, 1944 Tacoma, Washington, U.S.
- Died: May 29, 2013 (aged 69) Lakewood, Washington, U.S.
- Party: Republican
- Occupation: Teacher

Michael J. Carrell (April 10, 1944 – May 29, 2013) was an American politician and educator.

Born in Tacoma, Washington, Carrell graduated from Pacific Lutheran University with a degree in education. He was a teacher in middle school, high school, and college. Carrell served in the Washington House of Representatives 1995–2004 as a Republican. He then served as member of the Washington State Senate. He served the 28th district from 2004 until his death on May 29, 2013, in Seattle, of complications of myelodysplastic syndrome.
