= Steve Litzow =

American politician

Member of the Washington Senate from the 41st district
- In office December 6, 2010 – January 9, 2017
- Preceded by: Randy Gordon
- Succeeded by: Lisa Wellman

Personal details
- Born: Stephen Robert Litzow; 1961 (age 64–65) Wisconsin, U.S.
- Party: Republican
- Spouse: Jenny Litzow
- Education: Northwestern University (BA)

Stephen Robert Litzow (born 1961) is an American politician who served as a member of the Washington State Senate, representing the 41st district from 2010 to 2017. A liberal Republican, his district includes the affluent Seattle suburbs of Bellevue, Beaux Arts Village, Mercer Island, Newcastle, and parts of Issaquah, Sammamish, and Renton in King County. Litzow is widely seen as a centrist. He was defeated by Democrat Lisa Wellman in the 2016 election.

== Background ==
Litzow resides on Mercer Island and is a graduate of Northwestern University. He was twice elected to the city council before being elected in 2010 to represent Washington's 41st Legislative District in the State Senate. Litzow was a Procter & Gamble executive and a business consultant before being elected to the Senate.

== Committee assignments ==
- Chair, Senate Early Learning and K-12 Education Committee
- Senate Business, Financial Services, & Trade Committee
- Senate Transportation Committee
