= Keith Wagoner =

American politician from Washington

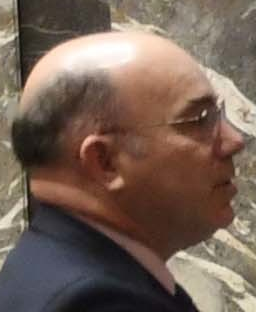
- Wagoner in 2019

Member of the Washington State Senate from the 39th district
- Incumbent
- Assumed office January 3, 2018
- Preceded by: Kirk Pearson

Mayor of Sedro Woolley
- In office January 1, 2016 – January 3, 2018
- Preceded by: Mike Anderson
- Succeeded by: Julia Johnson

Personal details
- Born: Keith Leonard Wagoner; 1961 (age 64–65) Rockledge, Florida, U.S.
- Party: Republican
- Spouse: Wen Wagoner
- Children: 3
- Education: Washington State University; United States Naval Academy (BS); University of San Diego (MA)
- Website: State Senate website

Keith Leonard Wagoner (born 1961) is an American politician currently serving in the Washington State Senate representing Washington's 39th legislative district, He previously served as mayor of Sedro-Woolley, Washington. He is a member of the Republican Party.

== Early life, education, and military career ==
Wagoner grew up on a farm in Alger, Skagit County, Washington and graduated from Burlington-Edison High School in 1979. Following high school graduation, he attended Washington State University until he received an appointment to the U.S. Naval Academy in Annapolis, Maryland. Following his graduation from the USNA in 1984 with a Bachelor of Science degree in physical oceanography, Wagoner was commissioned a second lieutenant in the U.S. Marine Corps. After completing Marine Officer Training at Quantico, Virginia, he took an inter-service transfer for Naval Aviation flight training at NAS Pensacola in Florida. He earned his pilot's wings in 1986.

In addition to his bachelor's degree, Wagoner also has a Master's Degree in Global Leadership from the University of San Diego.

While a Naval Aviator, Wagoner flew the CH-53E Super Stallion helicopter and the CH-46 Sea Knight helicopter. His Navy career spanned 23 years with duty stations in Sicily, Okinawa, Guam, Seoul, Korea and Tokyo, Japan, among others. He retired from the Navy as a Commander in 2007.

== Political career ==
In 2007, Wagoner and his wife returned to Skagit County to live in Sedro Woolley. Not long after their relocation, Wagoner ran for and won a seat on the Sedro Woolley City Council. After five years on the council, he won the town mayoral seat and was in that position for two years before being selected unanimously by a vote of electors to the 39th Legislative District's vacant senate seat on January 3, 2018. The district contains parts of Skagit County, Snohomish County, and King County. Wagoner ran for the same seat in November 2018 and was elected by a 2/3 majority. He won re-election in 2020.

Currently, Wagoner serves on the Early Learning and K-12 Education Committee and the Ways and Means Committee. He is the Republican Whip as well as lead on the Behavioral Health Subcommittee.

Wagoner is on record as a supporter of President Donald Trump. Shortly after the 2020 United States presidential election, Wagoner stated he felt "The process has not played out". He did not claim the election was "stolen" but explained that there are Republicans who do not trust the voting system in the state of Washington or in the country.

On November 30, 2021, Wagoner announced that he would run for Washington Secretary of State, challenging appointed incumbent Democrat Steve Hobbs in 2022. Wagoner lost in the primary to independent Julie Anderson.

== Personal life ==
Wagoner's wife is Wen Wagoner; together they have three adult children, one of whom is a graduate of the US Naval Academy. Wagoner lives with his wife in Sedro Woolley.

== Awards ==
- 2020 Senate Legislator of the Year. Presented by The Washington State Fraternal Order of Police.
- 2021 City Champion Awards. Presented by Association of Washington Cities (AWC).
