= Lisa Wellman =

American politician from Washington

Member of the Washington State Senate from the 41st district
- Incumbent
- Assumed office January 9, 2017
- Preceded by: Steve Litzow

Personal details
- Born: Lisa Zetumer; October 25, 1943 (age 82) New York City, New York, U.S.
- Party: Democratic
- Education: Barat College (BA); Antioch College
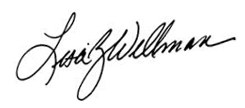
- Signature
- Website: official

Lisa Zetumer Wellman (born October 25, 1943) is an American politician serving as a member of the Washington State Senate representing the 41st district, having defeated incumbent Steve Litzow in the 2016 election. In her spare time, she enjoys bridge.

Wellman is Jewish.
