= Emily Wicks =

American politician from Washington state

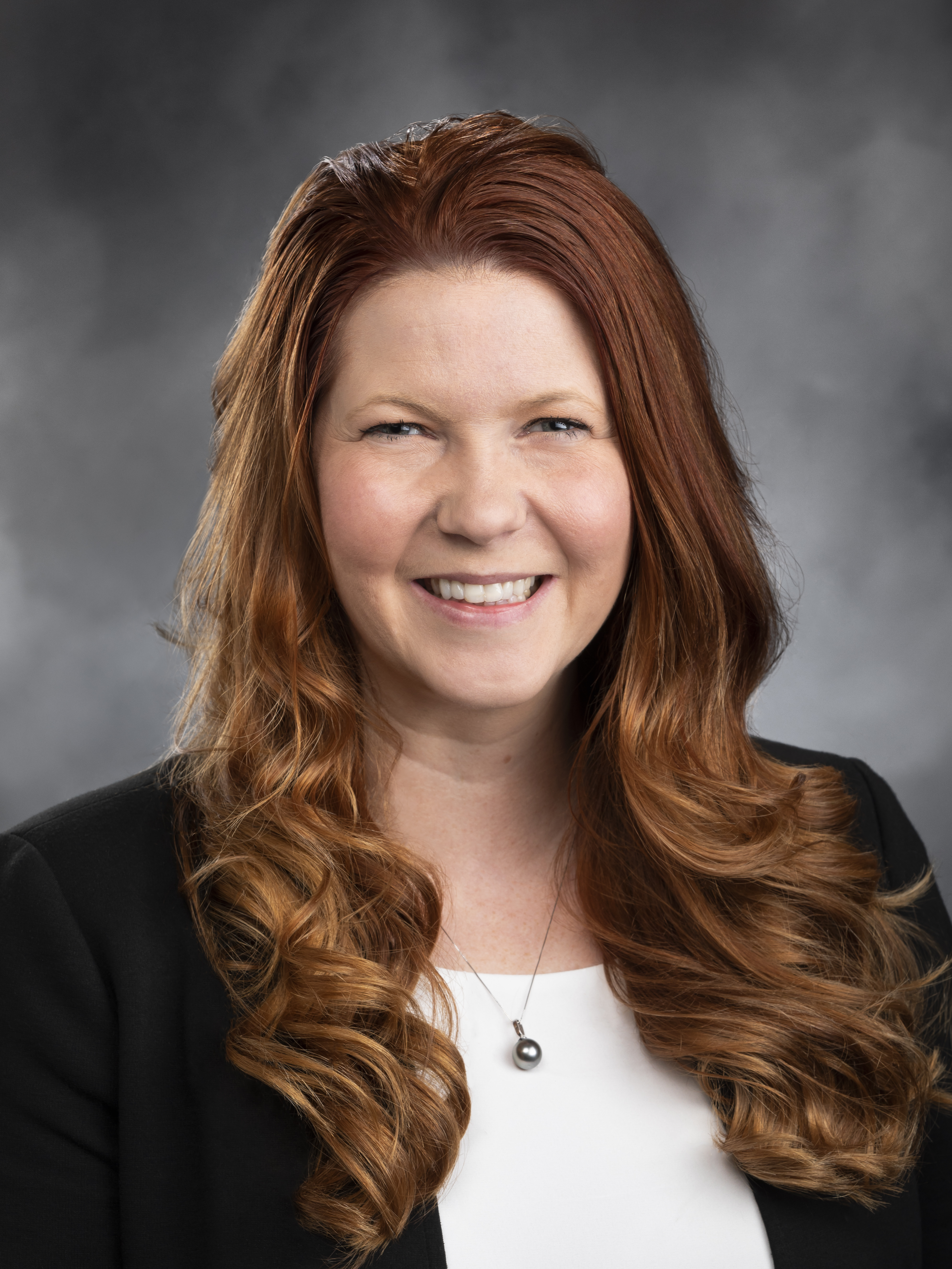

Member of the Washington House of Representatives from the 38th district
- In office May 13, 2020 – January 9, 2023
- Preceded by: June Robinson
- Succeeded by: Julio Cortes

Personal details
- Born: 1985 (age 40–41) Everett, Washington, U.S.
- Party: Democratic
- Education: Washington State University (BA)

Emily M. Wicks (born 1985) is an American politician who served as a member of the Washington House of Representatives for the 38th legislative district from 2020 to 2023.

== Early life and education ==
Wicks was born in Everett, Washington, and raised in Marysville, Washington. She earned a Bachelor of Arts degree in political science and public relations from Washington State University.

== Career ==
Wicks was appointed to the state house in 2020 to fill a vacancy left by June Robinson who had been appointed to fill the seat of retiring state senator John McCoy. On March 21, 2022, Wicks announced she would not seek re-election to the House.

Wicks worked as the communications and community relations coordinator for the Marysville School District. She worked on the 2012 gubernatorial campaign of Jay Inslee, and as a legislative aide for then-representative Cyrus Habib. At the time of appointment to the legislature, Wicks was a consultant for non-profits and small government organizations, and served as president of the Washington chapter of the National Women's Political Caucus.

== Personal life ==
Wicks lives in Everett with her partner, James Day.
