= Ted Haley =

American politician

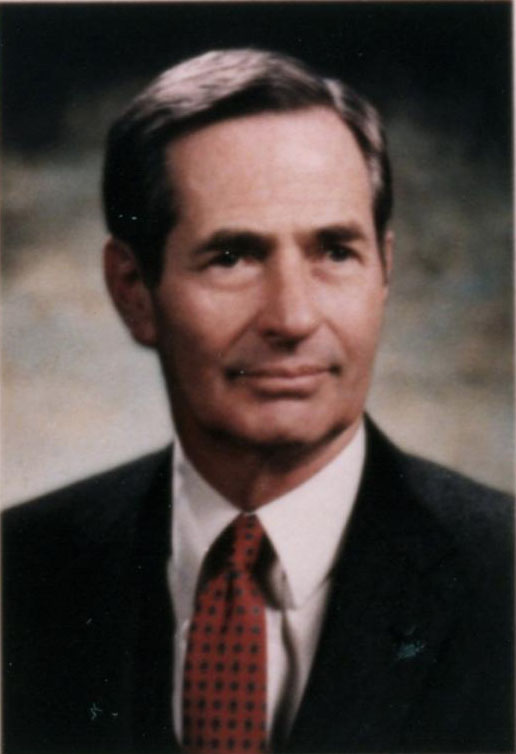
- Haley in 1983

Member of the Washington House of Representatives for the 28th district
- In office 1975–1979
- Preceded by: Beverley Vozenilek
- Succeeded by: Sally Flint

Member of the Washington State Senate for the 28th district
- In office 1979–1985

Personal details
- Born: Theodore Reuben Haley; November 17, 1920 Tacoma, Washington, U.S.
- Died: October 5, 2017 (aged 96) Tacoma, Washington, U.S.
- Party: Republican
- Occupation: doctor

Theodore Reuben Haley (November 17, 1920 – October 5, 2017) was an American politician in the state of Washington. He served in the Washington House of Representatives from 1975 to 1979 and Washington State Senate from 1979 to 1985 as a Republican. He was a political moderate in keeping with the Washington State tradition of electing moderates to public office. He billed himself as a social liberal and a fiscal conservative.

He had always had a libertarian streak and eventually lost patience with the Republican Party at the national level as the right wing gained dominance. Later in life he ran for public office as a Libertarian without expecting to win, but mainly to get his ideas into public discourse. His 2004 platform included a few progressive ideas that by now have become law:

- Give gays equal protection including marriage, adoption, military service.
- Legalize assisted suicide like Oregon.
- Cut fossil fuel use.
- Increase wind, sun, water, nuclear, hybrid energy.
- Enact an income tax, reduce sales tax + eliminate the B&O tax as most experts advise.
- Eliminate corporate welfare, farm subsidies, tax breaks for wealthy.
- Give teachers more pay, smaller classes.
- Enact health care for all, stem cell research, human cloning.
- Spend less on military.
- Allow the UN to have its own military, lessening our policing the world.
- End Cuban embargo.
- Reduce discriminating immigration rules.
- Treat Palestine, Israel equally.
- Require registration, locks on handguns. Sell ammo to permittees only.
- Legalize, tax, sell marijuana in state liquor stores.
- Legalize all drugs. The war on drugs is an expensive, colossal failure.
- Legalize prostitution (let a lady make an honest living the best way she knows how.)
- Provide free birth control, abortion, sterilization, for 3rd world's poor.
- Change to the metric system.
- Create 2nd (phonetic) spelling of English. Help foreigners learn this difficult language.

He died in October 2017 at the age of 96.
