= Charles K. Wiggins =

American judge (1947–2025)

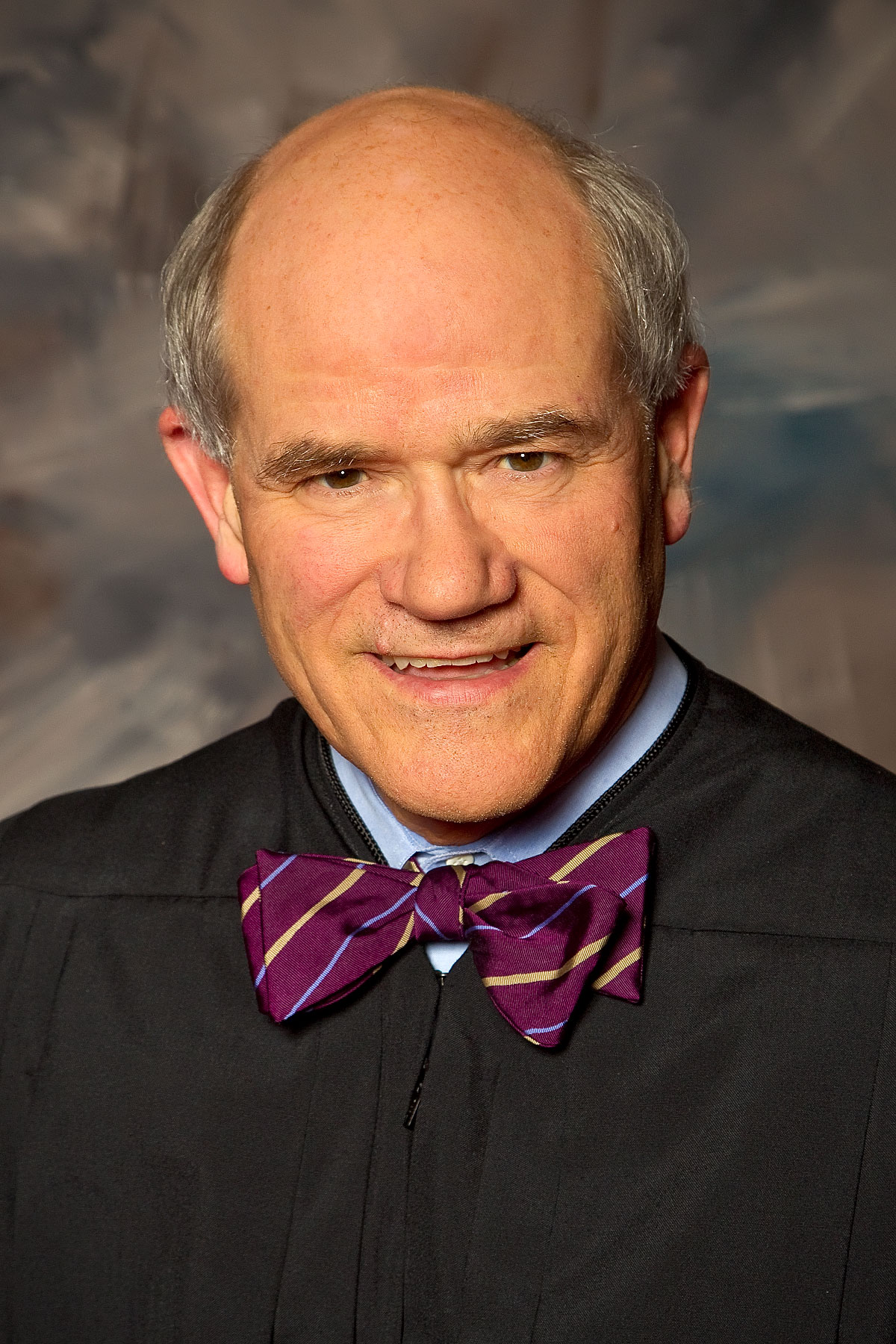

Associate Justice of the Washington Supreme Court
- In office January 7, 2011 – March 31, 2020
- Preceded by: Richard B. Sanders
- Succeeded by: Helen Whitener

Personal details
- Born: September 7, 1947 Fort Bragg, North Carolina, U.S.
- Died: May 27, 2025 (aged 77)
- Education: Princeton University (AB); University of Hawaiʻi (MBA); Duke University (JD)
- Occupation: Lawyer, judge

Charles Kenneth Wiggins (September 7, 1947 – May 27, 2025) was an American judge who was member of the Washington Supreme Court. He was elected to the court in 2010, defeating incumbent Richard B. Sanders.

== Biography ==
=== Early life and education ===
Wiggins was born on September 7, 1947. He grew up the son of a career warrant officer and was a Boy Scout Eagle Scout. Wiggins attended Princeton University on Army Reserve Officers' Training Corps scholarship, graduating magna cum laude and Phi Beta Kappa. He then served in the United States Army Military Intelligence Corps for four years, rising to the rank of Captain and earning his Master of Business Administration in night school. He attended Duke Law School with help from the G.I. Bill and was admitted to the bar in 1976.

=== Career ===
In private practice, Wiggins was a name partner with the firm of Edwards, Sieh, Wiggins & Hathaway, and later where he focused primarily on in appeals, both civil and criminal, in the State Supreme Court, the State Court of Appeals, the Ninth Circuit Court of Appeals, and once as co-counsel in the United States Supreme Court, but also tried cases throughout Washington state. Later he established the firm of Wiggins & Masters PLLC on Bainbridge Island handling exclusively appellate cases. He served as a judge on Division Two of the Washington Court of Appeals,. He also served as a pro-tempore superior court judge in a number of cases in King and Jefferson Counties and as a pro-tempore district court judge in Kitsap County.

Wiggins served on the Washington State Bar Rules Committee, the Disciplinary Board, task forces drafting and revising the rules that govern many aspects of law. He served as president-elect, president, and past president of the Washington Chapter of the American Judicature Society, working to help educate the public about judicial elections and to improve judicial elections generally. He worked with a coalition of lawyers, bar associations and government groups to establish the nonpartisan award-winning website Voting For Judges.

In October 2018, Wiggins joined the majority when the court abolished the state's death penalty because they found its racist imposition violated the Constitution of Washington.

On January 16, 2020, Wiggins announced his retirement, effective at the end of March 2020.

=== Death ===
Wiggins died May 27, 2025, at the age of 77.

Legal offices
Preceded by Richard B. Sanders	Associate Justice of the Washington Supreme Court; 2011–2020	Succeeded by G. Helen Whitener
