= Steve O'Ban =

American politician (born 1961)

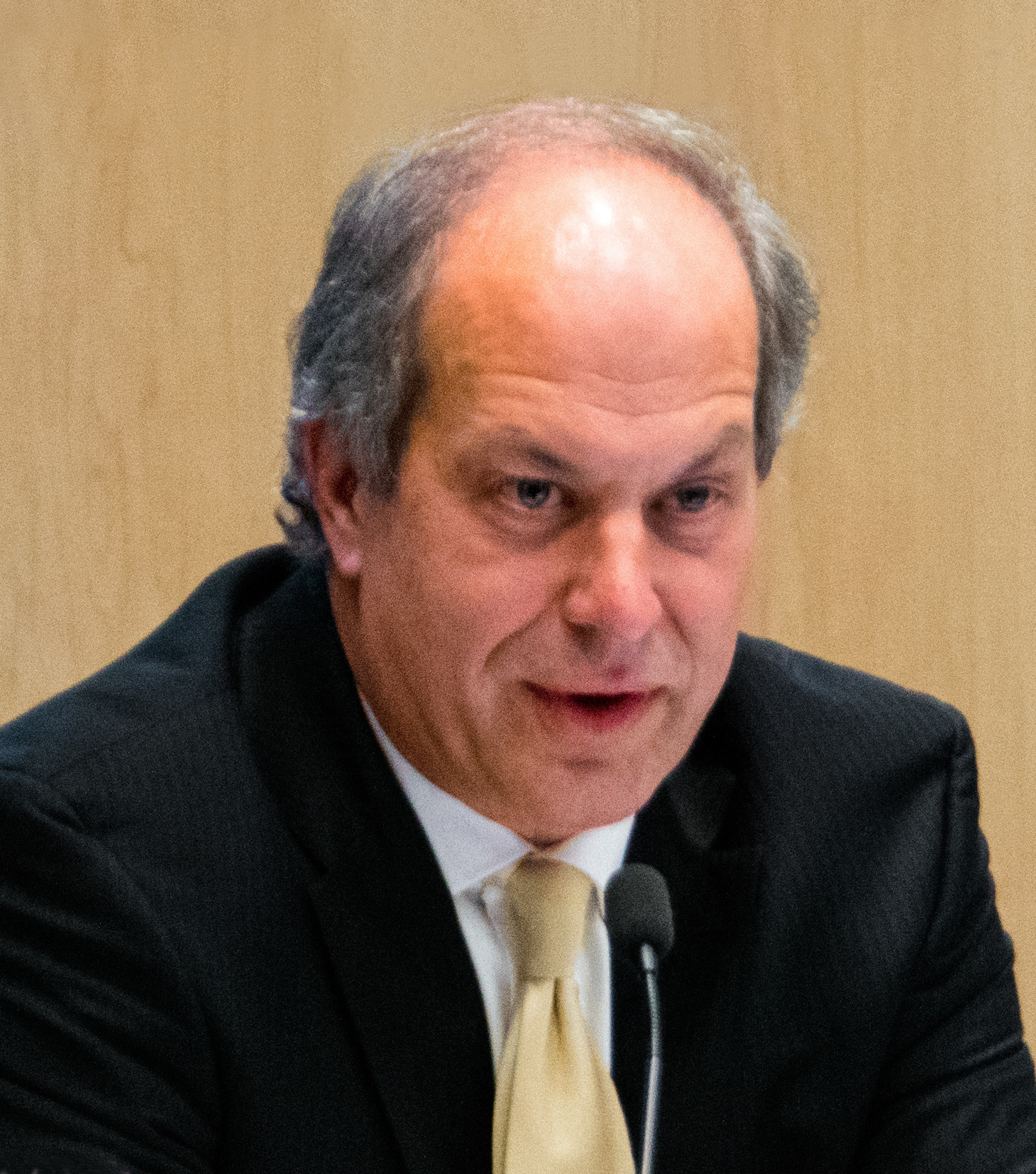
- O'Ban in 2017

Member of the Washington Senate from the 28th district
- In office June 4, 2013 – January 11, 2021
- Preceded by: Mike Carrell
- Succeeded by: T'wina Nobles

Member of the Washington House of Representatives from the 28th district
- In office January 14, 2013 – June 4, 2013
- Preceded by: Troy Kelley
- Succeeded by: Dick Muri

Personal details
- Born: Steven Thomas O'Ban; July 12, 1961 (age 64) California, U.S.
- Party: Republican
- Spouse: Laurie
- Children: 2
- Education: University of Washington (BA); Seattle University Law School (JD)
- Profession: Lawyer
- Website: Official

Steven Thomas O'Ban (born July 12, 1961) is an American politician and attorney who served as a member of the Washington State Senate, representing the 28th district from 2013 to 2021. A member of the Republican Party, he previously served as a member of the Washington House of Representatives in 2013.

== Career ==
A Republican, he represented the 28th Legislative District in Pierce County. He was appointed to the State Senate by the Pierce County Council on June 4, 2013, following the death of State Senator Mike Carrell. On November 3, 2020, O'Ban lost the long-held Republican seat to T'wina Nobles. Preceding his appointment, O'Ban served for less than five months as a member of the Washington State House of Representatives.
