= June Robinson =

American politician from Washington

Member of the Washington State Senate from the 38th district
- Incumbent
- Assumed office May 13, 2020
- Preceded by: John McCoy

Member of the Washington House of Representatives from the 38th district
- In office December 16, 2013 – May 13, 2020
- Preceded by: John McCoy
- Succeeded by: Emily Wicks

Personal details
- Born: June R. Grube; June 27, 1959 (age 67) Lancaster County, Pennsylvania, U.S.
- Party: Democratic
- Spouse: Hilbert Robinson
- Education: University of Delaware (BA); University of Michigan (MPH)
- Profession: Public Health – Seattle & King County Program manager
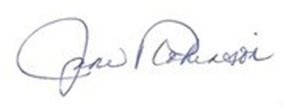
- Signature
- Website: Official

June R. Grube Robinson (born June 27, 1959) is an American Democratic Party politician. She is a member of the Washington State Senate, representing the 38th Legislative District. Robinson was appointed to the Washington House of Representatives by the Snohomish County Council on December 16, 2013, to fill the vacancy left after John McCoy was appointed to the Washington State Senate. In 2012, she fell about 5.5 points short of being elected to an open seat on Everett City Council following the death of Everett City Councilman Drew Nielsen.

Robinson was appointed to the Washington State Senate to fill a vacancy left after McCoy's retirement in 2020.

In 2025, Robinson sponsored the State Senate Bill 5737 that proposed cutting the bonuses for certified Washington state teachers.
