= 2020 Washington Democratic presidential primary =

- March 10, 2020

107 Democratic National Convention delegates (89 pledged, 18 unpledged) The number of pledged delegates won is determined by the popular vote

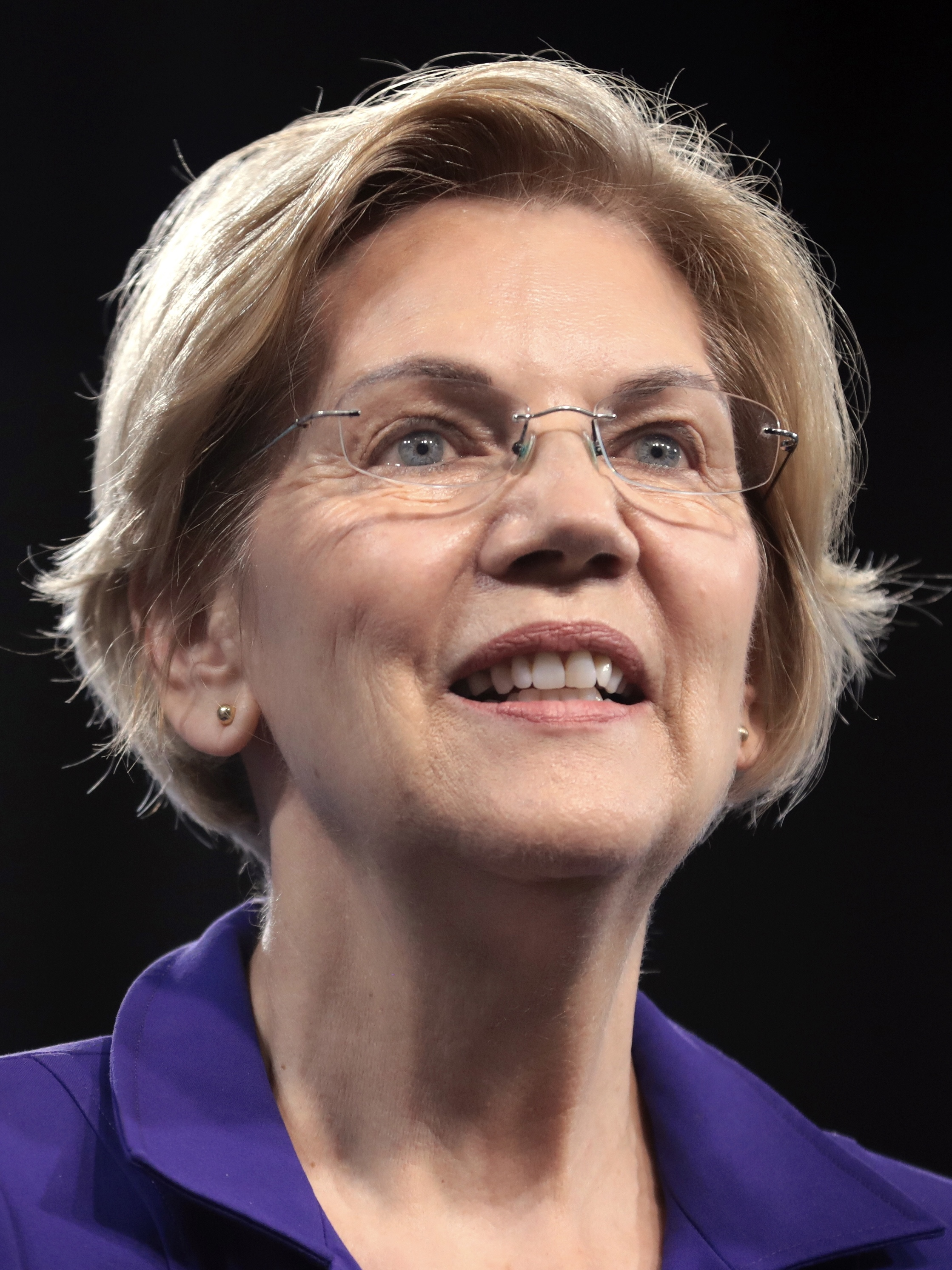

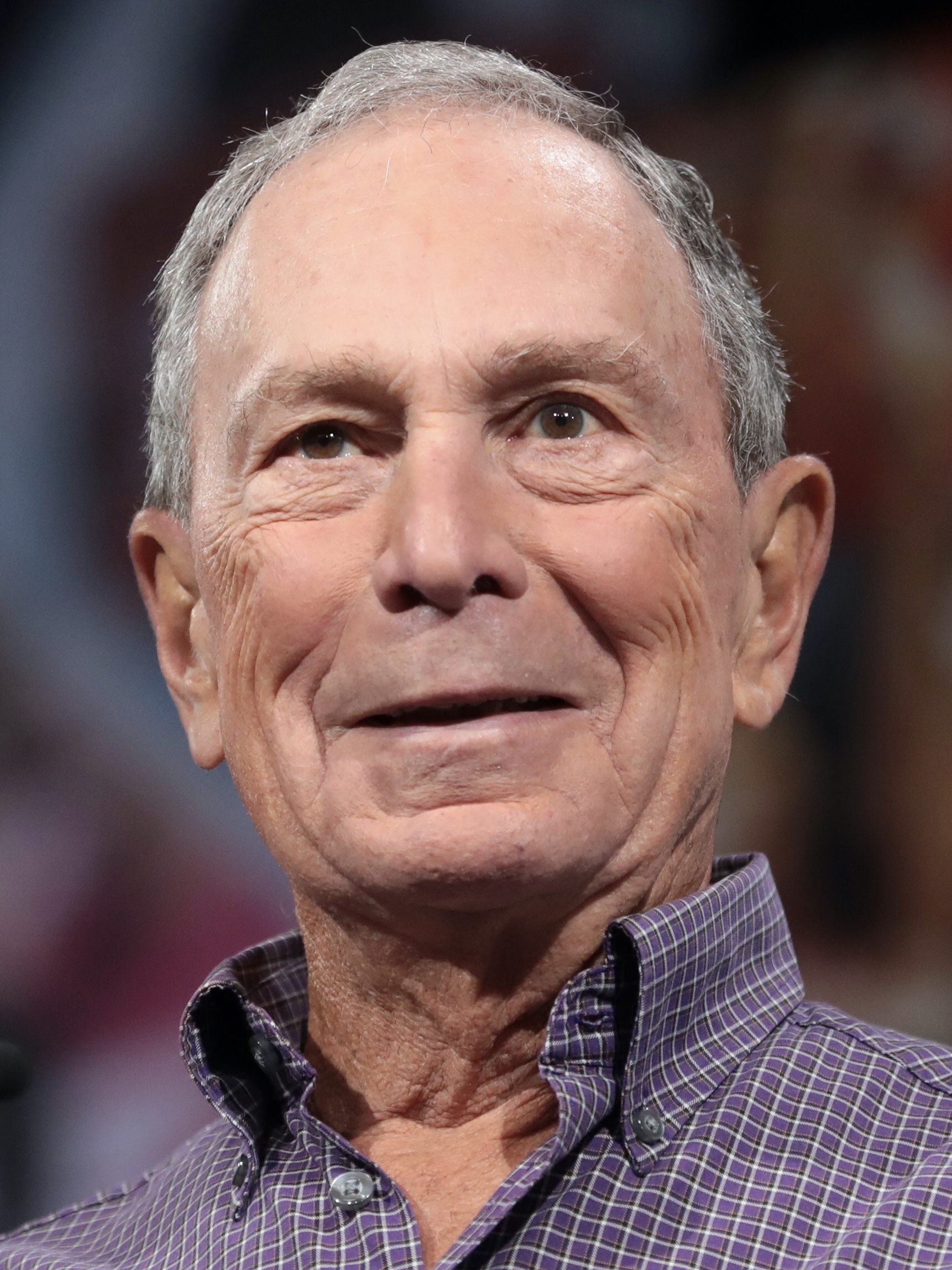
Candidate	Joe Biden	Bernie Sanders
Home state	Delaware	Vermont
Delegate count	46	43
Popular vote	591,403	570,039
Percentage	37.98%	36.60%
Candidate	Elizabeth Warren (withdrawn) (Note: Warren withdrew on March 5, 2020, five days before the primary. Ballots had already been mailed to voters on February 21.)	Michael Bloomberg (withdrawn) (Note: Bloomberg withdrew on March 4, 2020, six days before the primary. Ballots had already been mailed to voters on February 21.)
Home state	Massachusetts	New York
Delegate count	0	0
Popular vote	142,652	122,530
Percentage	9.16%	7.87%
- County results Joe Biden Bernie Sanders

The 2020 Washington Democratic presidential primary took place on March 10, 2020, as one of several states voting the week after Super Tuesday in the Democratic Party primaries for the 2020 presidential election. The state-run semi-open primary, which was used instead of party-run caucuses for the first time by Washington's Democrats, awarded 109 delegates to the 2020 Democratic National Convention, of which 89 were pledged delegates allocated according to the results of the primary.

On March 16, 2020, almost a week after the primary, major news outlets including CNN, NBC, The New York Times, and the Associated Press called the narrow race for former vice president Joe Biden, who won 37.9% of the vote and 46 delegates, around 20,000 votes ahead of senator Bernie Sanders. Sanders reached 36.6% of the vote and received 43 delegates, adding another crucial loss to his campaign, while a win, widely expected in polls, had been seen as vital for him to remain a realistic contender for the presidential nomination. Senator Elizabeth Warren and former mayor Michael Bloomberg, who had already withdrawn from the race, came close to 10% of the vote due to early votes, winning no delegates.

== Procedure ==
Washington was one of six states (along with Democrats Abroad) which held primaries on March 10, 2020, one week after Super Tuesday. As a primary totally done by mail-in voting, it took place from February 21 to March 10, 2020. On March 14, 2019, Governor Jay Inslee had signed a bill moving the state's previously non-binding presidential primary up from May to the second Tuesday in March, roughly the typical time frame Democrats had already been using for their caucuses in the past. A month later, on April 7, 2019, the Washington Democratic Party's central committee historically approved the usage of the hybrid vote-by-mail presidential primary in a 121–40 vote, marking the first time in the state's history that Democrats used a primary.

In Washington, a vote-by-mail state, there was an 18-day voting period and all ballots had to be either dropped off by 8:00 p.m. at a designated ballot box or postmarked by the date of the primary. For people's votes to be counted, they had to select either a Democratic or Republican ballot. Both ballots were distributed to every registered voter, as Washington State did not track party registration; no independent ballots existed. In the primary, candidates had to meet a threshold of 15 percent at the congressional district or statewide level to be considered viable. The 89 pledged delegates to the 2020 Democratic National Convention were allocated proportionally on the basis of the results of the primary. Of these, between 3 and 11 were allocated to each of the state's 10 congressional districts and another 12 were allocated to party leaders and elected officials (PLEO delegates), in addition to 19 at-large delegates. The March primary as part of Stage I on the primary timetable received no bonus delegates, in order to disperse the primaries between more different date clusters and keep too many states from hoarding on a March date.

Following legislative district caucuses on April 26, 2020, to choose delegates to congressional district caucuses and the state convention, or county conventions on May 3, 2020, also to choose delegates to congressional district caucuses and the state convention, the congressional district caucuses met on May 30, 2020, to select national convention district delegates. The state party committee subsequently met at the state convention between June 13 and June 14, 2020, to vote on the 19 at-large and 12 pledged PLEO delegates for the Democratic National Convention. The delegation also included 20 unpledged PLEO delegates: 10 members of the Democratic National Committee, 9 members of Congress (both Senators and 7 representatives), and the governor Jay Inslee.

== Candidates ==
The following individuals qualified for the ballot in Washington:

Running

- Joe Biden
- Tulsi Gabbard
- Bernie Sanders

Withdrawn

- Michael Bennet
- Michael Bloomberg (Note: Candidate withdrew after Super Tuesday when all-mail voting had already begun.)
- Cory Booker
- Pete Buttigieg (Note: Candidate withdrew before Super Tuesday when all-mail voting had already begun.)
- John Delaney
- Amy Klobuchar
- Deval Patrick
- Tom Steyer
- Elizabeth Warren
- Andrew Yang

There was also an uncommitted option on the ballot.

== Polling ==
Polling aggregation
Source of poll aggregation	Date updated	Dates polled	Joe Biden	Bernie Sanders	Tulsi Gabbard	Un- decided (Note: Calculated by taking the difference of 100% and all other candidates combined)
270 to Win	Mar 10, 2020	Feb 15 – Mar 9, 2020	33.5%	34.0%	1.3%	34.7%
RealClear Politics	Mar 9, 2020	No averages at this time				
FiveThirtyEight	Mar 10, 2020	until Mar 9, 2020 (Note: FiveThirtyEight aggregates polls with a trendline regression of polls rather than a strict average of recent polls.)	39.8%	37.1%	1.4%	21.7%
Average			36.65%	36.55%	1.35%	28.2%

Tabulation of individual polls of the 2020 Washington Democratic primary
Poll source	Date(s) administered	Sample size (Note: Key: A – all adults RV – registered voters LV – likely voters V – unclear)	Margin of error	Joe Biden	Michael Bloomberg	Pete Buttigieg	Kamala Harris	Jay Inslee	Amy Klobuchar	Bernie Sanders	Elizabeth Warren	Andrew Yang	Other	Undecided
Swayable	Mar 9, 2020	1,840 (LV)	± 3.0%	39%	–	–	–	–	–	37%	–	–	25% (Note: Gabbard with 1%; Other with 24%)	–
Data for Progress	Mar 7–9, 2020	497 (LV)	± 5.1%	49%	–	–	–	–	–	43%	6%	–	2% (Note: Gabbard with 2%)	–
Survey USA/KING-TV	Mar 4–6, 2020	550 (LV)	± 5.4%	36%	–	–	–	–	–	35%	10%	–	13% (Note: "Some Other Democrat" with 13%)	5%
	Mar 5, 2020	Warren withdraws from the race												
Data for Progress	Mar 4–5, 2020	737 (LV)	± 3.6%	47%	–	–	–	–	–	44%	5% (Note: Estimated early vote share; respondents in the poll who indicated Warren as their first choice but that they had not yet voted were assigned to their indicated second choice.)	–	3% (Note: Gabbard with 3%)	–
	Mar 4, 2020	Bloomberg withdraws from the race												
	Mar 2, 2020	Klobuchar withdraws from the race												
	Mar 1, 2020	Buttigieg withdraws from the race												
Elway Research/Cascade Public Media	Feb 15–18, 2020	404 (LV)	± 5.0%	10%	15%	9%	–	–	11%	21%	11%	0%	2% (Note: Gabbard with 1%; Delaney with 0%; Steyer, Bennet, Patrick, and Booker with no voters; "other" with 1%)	22%
	Feb 11, 2020	Yang withdraws from the race												
Survey USA/KING-TV	Jan 26–28, 2020	536 (LV)	± 6.2%	21%	12%	8%	–	–	3%	26%	16%	4%	2% (Note: Steyer with 2%; Gabbard with 0%; "Some Other Democrat" with 0%)	7%
	Dec 3, 2019	Harris withdraws from the race												
	Aug 21, 2019	Inslee withdraws from the race												
Zogby Analytics	Jul 22 – Aug 1, 2019	1,265 (LV)	± 2.8%	19%	–	5%	9%	6%	1%	18%	14%	2%	11% (Note: Castro, Gillibrand, and O'Rourke with 2%; Booker, Delaney, Gabbard, and Hickenlooper with 1%; Someone else with 1%)	16%

== Results ==
Popular vote share by county Biden—30–40% Biden—40–50% Sanders—30–40% Sanders—40–50%

2020 Washington Democratic presidential primary
Candidate	Votes	%	Delegates
Joe Biden	591,403	37.98	46
Bernie Sanders	570,039	36.60	43
Elizabeth Warren (withdrawn)	142,652	9.16	
Michael Bloomberg (withdrawn)	122,530	7.87	
Pete Buttigieg (withdrawn)	63,344	4.07	
Amy Klobuchar (withdrawn)	33,383	2.14	
Tulsi Gabbard	13,199	0.85	
Andrew Yang (withdrawn)	6,403	0.41	
Tom Steyer (withdrawn)	3,455	0.22	
Michael Bennet (withdrawn)	2,044	0.13	
Cory Booker (withdrawn)	1,314	0.08	
John Delaney (withdrawn)	573	0.04	
Deval Patrick (withdrawn)	508	0.03	
Uncommitted	6,450	0.41	
Total	1,557,297	100.00%	89

=== Results by county ===
2020 Washington Democratic primary (results per county)
County	Joe Biden		Bernie Sanders		Elizabeth Warren		Michael Bloomberg		Pete Buttigieg		Amy Klobuchar		Tulsi Gabbard		Andrew Yang		Tom Steyer		Michael Bennet		Cory Booker		John Delaney		Deval Patrick		Uncommitted		Total write-ins		Total votes cast
County	Votes	%	Votes	%	Votes	%	Votes	%	Votes	%	Votes	%	Votes	%	Votes	%	Votes	%	Votes	%	Votes	%	Votes	%	Votes	%	Votes	%	Votes	%	Total votes cast
Adams	315	34.31	322	35.08	60	6.54	131	14.27	26	2.83	24	2.61	11	1.20	7	0.76	6	0.65	3	0.33	0	0	5	0.54	1	0.11	7	0.76	0	0	918
Asotin	1,148	39.70	730	25.24	203	7.02	414	14.32	177	6.12	91	3.15	41	1.42	20	0.69	19	0.66	4	0.14	4	0.14	3	0.10	2	0.07	28	0.97	8	0.28	2,892
Benton	9,003	38.95	7,458	32.27	1,654	7.16	2,329	10.08	1,165	5.04	619	2.68	343	1.48	121	0.52	85	0.37	41	0.18	31	0.13	20	0.09	10	0.04	167	0.72	67	0.29	23,113
Chelan	4,813	38.41	4,192	33.46	980	7.82	1,171	9.35	663	5.29	359	2.87	134	1.07	50	0.40	47	0.38	29	0.23	12	0.10	3	0.02	5	0.04	64	0.51	8	0.06	12,530
Clallam	7,255	38.91	5,588	29.97	1,789	9.60	1,910	10.24	921	4.94	632	3.39	220	1.18	65	0.35	65	0.35	31	0.17	17	0.09	10	0.05	8	0.04	114	0.61	19	0.10	18,644
Clark	32,525	37.73	30,341	35.20	6,717	7.79	8,296	9.62	4,332	5.03	1,801	2.09	863	1.00	370	0.43	250	0.29	137	0.16	66	0.08	33	0.04	36	0.04	323	0.37	110	0.13	86,200
Columbia	190	37.92	135	26.95	34	6.79	69	13.77	26	5.19	23	4.59	8	1.60	2	0.40	2	0.40	2	0.40	2	0.40	1	0.20	0	0	4	0.80	3	0.60	501
Cowlitz	6,459	39.84	4,924	30.37	1,061	6.54	2,091	12.90	747	4.61	339	2.09	186	1.15	93	0.57	84	0.52	47	0.29	11	0.07	10	0.06	15	0.09	120	0.74	25	0.15	16,212
Douglas	1,905	40.58	1,546	32.94	288	6.14	485	10.33	233	4.96	104	2.22	49	1.04	23	0.49	15	0.32	11	0.23	7	0.15	4	0.09	1	0.02	19	0.40	4	0.09	4,694
Ferry	306	31.74	347	36.00	75	7.78	124	12.86	50	5.19	31	3.22	14	1.45	3	0.31	0	0	0	0	0	0	1	0.10	2	0.21	11	1.14	0	0	964
Franklin	2,477	34.93	2,865	40.40	399	5.63	728	10.27	254	3.58	144	2.03	79	1.11	39	0.55	21	0.30	27	0.38	9	0.13	11	0.16	3	0.04	31	0.44	5	0.07	7,092
Garfield	107	40.23	62	23.31	26	9.77	30	11.28	20	7.52	13	4.89	4	1.50	0	0	2	0.75	1	0.38	0	0	0	0	0	0	0	0	1	0.38	266
Grant	2,276	33.34	2,285	33.47	438	6.42	951	13.93	381	5.58	213	3.12	91	1.33	34	0.50	35	0.51	23	0.34	17	0.25	4	0.06	2	0.03	59	0.86	17	0.25	6,826
Grays Harbor	4,097	35.27	3,865	33.27	853	7.34	1,495	12.87	632	5.44	305	2.63	111	0.96	53	0.46	59	0.51	24	0.21	13	0.11	9	0.08	5	0.04	74	0.64	21	0.18	11,616
Island	8,394	40.20	6,246	29.91	1,991	9.53	1,873	8.97	1,082	5.18	750	3.59	233	1.12	69	0.33	60	0.29	17	0.08	13	0.06	10	0.05	8	0.04	115	0.55	20	0.10	20,881
Jefferson	5,086	36.82	5,163	37.38	1,469	10.64	930	6.73	474	3.43	386	2.79	114	0.83	31	0.22	27	0.20	11	0.08	11	0.08	6	0.04	5	0.04	85	0.62	14	0.10	13,812
King	235,655	38.26	232,575	37.76	67,096	10.89	36,978	6.00	21,278	3.45	12,130	1.97	3,701	0.60	2,370	0.38	814	0.13	560	0.09	459	0.07	128	0.02	149	0.02	1,545	0.25	424	0.07	615,862
Kitsap	23,998	38.96	20,029	32.52	5,713	9.28	5,388	8.75	3,171	5.15	1,715	2.78	594	0.96	258	0.42	177	0.29	65	0.11	45	0.07	19	0.03	22	0.04	341	0.55	59	0.10	61,594
Kittitas	2,561	34.16	2,883	38.46	667	8.90	597	7.96	328	4.38	224	2.99	107	1.43	36	0.48	21	0.28	13	0.17	11	0.15	4	0.05	3	0.04	40	0.53	2	0.03	7,497
Klickitat	1,475	35.50	1,526	36.73	356	8.57	345	8.30	204	4.91	114	2.74	45	1.08	13	0.31	18	0.43	5	0.12	5	0.12	5	0.12	1	0.02	38	0.91	5	0.12	4,155
Lewis	3,512	35.66	3,453	35.06	719	7.30	1,120	11.37	488	4.95	216	2.19	113	1.15	39	0.40	37	0.38	21	0.21	14	0.14	12	0.12	5	0.05	86	0.87	14	0.14	9,849
Lincoln	414	36.32	295	25.88	83	7.28	183	16.05	75	6.58	39	3.42	24	2.11	5	0.44	3	0.26	4	0.35	1	0.09	0	0	0	0	12	1.05	2	0.18	1,140
Mason	4,613	38.20	3,892	32.23	845	7.00	1,442	11.94	618	5.12	307	2.54	135	1.12	39	0.32	60	0.50	20	0.17	10	0.08	4	0.03	3	0.02	73	0.60	15	0.12	12,076
Okanogan	1,996	33.39	2,327	38.93	564	9.43	544	9.10	220	3.68	131	2.19	62	1.04	27	0.45	10	0.17	17	0.28	8	0.13	3	0.05	2	0.03	54	0.90	13	0.22	5,978
Pacific	1,826	38.00	1,433	29.82	404	8.41	589	12.26	269	5.60	119	2.48	47	0.98	24	0.50	18	0.37	11	0.23	6	0.12	5	0.10	1	0.02	48	1.00	5	0.10	4,805
Pend Oreille	684	38.56	560	31.57	101	5.69	208	11.72	97	5.47	42	2.37	22	1.24	10	0.56	13	0.73	4	0.23	2	0.11	1	0.06	2	0.11	23	1.30	5	0.28	1,774
Pierce	61,097	40.23	54,385	35.81	10,938	7.20	13,340	8.78	5,856	3.86	2,489	1.64	1,401	0.92	671	0.44	350	0.23	232	0.15	143	0.09	62	0.04	53	0.03	690	0.45	167	0.11	151,874
San Juan	2,633	35.72	2,780	37.71	874	11.86	422	5.72	305	4.14	211	2.86	79	1.07	16	0.22	14	0.19	5	0.07	4	0.05	3	0.04	3	0.04	23	0.31	0	0	7,372
Skagit	10,145	39.36	8,514	33.03	2,090	8.11	2,371	9.20	1,227	4.76	760	2.95	274	1.06	82	0.32	71	0.28	41	0.16	23	0.09	9	0.03	8	0.03	129	0.50	32	0.12	25,776
Skamania	822	37.83	794	36.54	164	7.55	187	8.61	86	3.96	60	2.76	31	1.43	8	0.37	1	0.05	1	0.05	0	0	2	0.09	0	0	12	0.55	5	0.23	2,173
Snohomish	64,871	39.64	59,779	36.52	12,642	7.72	12,718	7.77	6,580	4.02	3,102	1.90	1,593	0.97	711	0.43	364	0.22	233	0.14	111	0.07	63	0.04	64	0.04	664	0.41	172	0.11	163,667
Spokane	30,618	35.68	29,750	34.67	6,520	7.60	9,880	11.51	4,581	5.34	2,001	2.33	828	0.96	390	0.45	252	0.29	115	0.13	104	0.12	46	0.05	23	0.03	596	0.69	102	0.12	85,806
Stevens	1,954	35.95	1,737	31.95	394	7.25	693	12.75	295	5.43	172	3.16	61	1.12	21	0.39	25	0.46	15	0.28	8	0.15	8	0.15	3	0.06	37	0.68	13	0.24	5,436
Thurston	23,350	35.69	24,833	37.95	6,184	9.45	5,072	7.75	2,776	4.24	1,583	2.42	593	0.91	284	0.43	179	0.27	76	0.12	52	0.08	24	0.04	17	0.03	351	0.54	54	0.08	65,428
Wahkiakum	345	38.33	285	31.67	62	6.89	106	11.78	49	5.44	23	2.56	11	1.22	4	0.44	1	0.11	3	0.33	1	0.11	0	0	0	0	7	0.78	3	0.33	900
Walla Walla	3,547	39.25	2,925	32.37	801	8.86	834	9.23	377	4.17	293	3.24	103	1.14	45	0.50	33	0.37	21	0.23	8	0.09	4	0.04	0	0	45	0.50	0	0	9,036
Whatcom	18,752	31.68	27,295	46.11	5,354	9.04	3,175	5.36	2,068	3.49	1,169	1.97	572	0.97	256	0.43	115	0.19	61	0.10	55	0.09	20	0.03	31	0.05	228	0.39	42	0.07	59,193
Whitman	2,050	30.09	3,040	44.63	727	10.67	383	5.62	291	4.27	144	2.11	72	1.06	37	0.54	12	0.18	5	0.07	3	0.04	0	0	6	0.09	37	0.54	5	0.07	6,812
Yakima	8,129	34.72	8,880	37.93	1,317	5.63	2,928	12.51	922	3.94	505	2.16	230	0.98	77	0.33	90	0.38	108	0.46	28	0.12	21	0.09	9	0.04	150	0.64	18	0.08	23,412
Total	591,403	37.94	570,039	36.57	142,652	9.15	122,530	7.86	63,344	4.06	33,383	2.14	13,199	0.85	6,403	0.41	3,455	0.22	2,044	0.13	1,314	0.08	573	0.04	508	0.03	6,450	0.41	1,479	0.09	1,558,776

== Analysis ==
Joe Biden won the Washington primary by a narrow 1.4 point margin, a regression for Bernie Sanders who in 2016 had beat Hillary Clinton in the state by a large 45 point margin in a caucus. Men made up 42% of the electorate, and Sanders won this group 41–28, while among women, who made up 58% of the electorate, Biden won 36–27. Sanders ran most strongly among voters ages 18–44, as he won this group 59–16. In contrast, Biden won among voters over the age of 45, 39–23.

== See also ==
- 2020 Washington Republican presidential primary
