= Helmut L. Jueling =

American politician

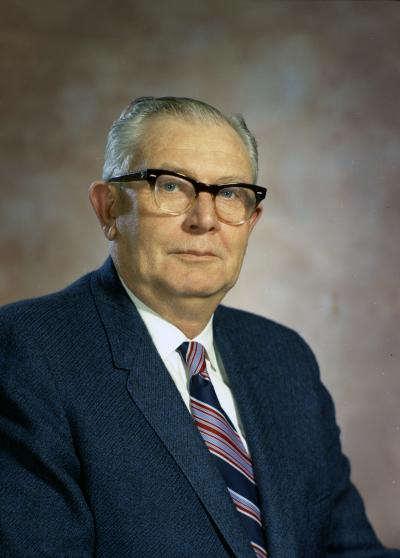
- Jueling in 1971

Member of the Washington House of Representatives for the 29th district
- In office 1967–1977

Member of the Washington House of Representatives for the 28th district
- In office 1961–1967

Personal details
- Born: October 16, 1913 Loup City, Nebraska, United States
- Died: February 8, 1990 (aged 76) Washington, United States
- Party: Republican

Helmut L. Jueling (October 16, 1913 – February 8, 1990) was an American politician in the state of Washington. He served in the Washington House of Representatives from 1961 to 1991.

He represented the Republican party. He graduated from the University of Puget Sound.
