= T'wina Nobles =

American politician (born 1981)

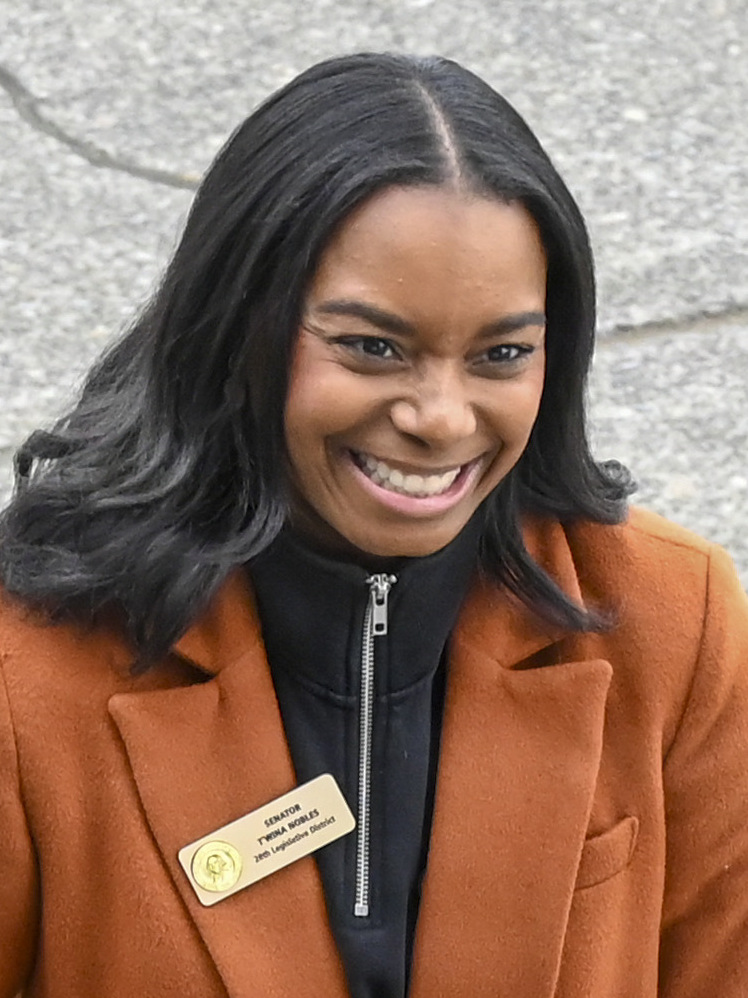

Member of the Washington State Senate from the 28th district
- Incumbent
- Assumed office January 11, 2021
- Preceded by: Steve O'Ban

Personal details
- Born: T'wina T. Fields; 1981 (age 44–45) Frankfurt, West Germany
- Party: Democratic
- Children: 3
- Education: University of Puget Sound (BA, MEd)
- Occupation: Teacher
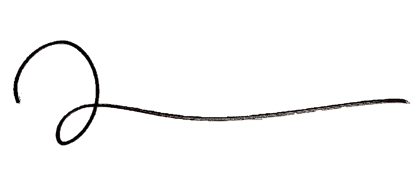
- Signature

T'wina T. Nobles (née Fields, formerly T'wina Franklin, born 1981) is an American politician who is a member the Washington State Senate from the 28th district, elected in 2020.

== Early life and education ==
Nobles was born in a military family in Frankfurt, West Germany. Nobles' mother was a drug user, and the family lived in Monterey, California before settling in the Columbus, Georgia area. Nobles was eventually placed in the foster care system in Phenix City, Alabama and became pregnant when she was 17. She earned a Bachelor of Arts degree in politics and Master of Education in teaching from the University of Puget Sound.

== Career ==
After earning her master's degree, Nobles worked as a teacher at Stadium High School and Lincoln High School in Tacoma, Washington. She served as a member of the University Place, Washington School Board and was the president of the Tacoma Urban League.

In March 2020, Nobles announced her candidacy for the 28th district in the Washington State Senate against incumbent Republican Steve O'Ban. Nobles won the Democratic primary and narrowly defeated O'Ban in the November general election. When she assumed office on January 11, 2021, she became the first black legislator elected to the senate since 2010.

Nobles is the vice chair of both Senate Committee on Higher Education and Workforce Development and the Senate K-12 Education Committee. She is also a member of the Transportation Committee.

== Personal life ==
Nobles and her husband have three children. Nobles's husband is a non-profit executive director and real estate broker in Tacoma.

== Notable legislation ==
Nobles voted in favor of HB 1589, which is described as supporting Washington's clean energy economy and transitioning to a clean, affordable, and reliable energy future by prohibiting the expansion of natural gas services and other regulations on natural gas companies.

Nobles voted in favor of HB 1054, which is described as establishing requirements for tactics and equipment used by peace officers by adding restrictions on vehicular pursuits, as well as prohibiting law enforcement from using chokeholds, the deployment of tear gas, or unleashed police dogs in the arrest or apprehension of suspects.

Nobles cosponsored SB 6346, establishing an income tax on annual income over $1 million and extending the state's working families' tax credit.
