= Washington's 28th legislative district =

American legislative district

Coordinates: 47°5′N 122°34′W

Map of Washington's 28th legislative district

Washington's 28th legislative district is one of forty-nine districts in Washington state for representation in the state legislature. It is in Pierce County, and contains a bit of Tacoma, and the cities of Fircrest, University Place, Lakewood, Steilacoom, and DuPont. It also contains Ketron Island, Anderson Island, and McNeil Island.

The district's legislators are state senator T'wina Nobles and state representatives Mari Leavitt (position 1) and Dan Bronoske (position 2), all Democrats.

== See also ==
- Washington Redistricting Commission
- Washington State Legislature
- Washington State Senate
- Washington House of Representatives
