= 2025 Washington Resolution 8201 =

- November 4, 2025
- Allow Investment of Long-Term Services and Supports Trust Fund in Stocks and Other Equities Amendment

Results
Choice	Votes	%
Yes	1,105,304	57.82%
No	806,299	42.18%
Total votes	1,911,603	100.00%
Yes
70–80%
60–70%
50–60%
No
60–70%
50–60%

SJR 8201, officially the Allow Investment of Long-Term Services and Supports Trust Fund in Stocks and Other Equities Amendment, is a legislatively referred constitutional amendment that appeared on the ballot in the U.S. state of Washington on November 4, 2025, concurrent with the 2025 United States elections. The resolution was approved by voters, with 58% voting in support and 42% voting in opposition.

== Background ==
The Long-Term Services and Supports Trust Fund, also known as the WA Care Fund, is a long-term care insurance program that provides assistance to members of the state workforce as they age. It was signed into law in 2019 and survived an attempt to repeal it in 2024. It is funded as a 0.58% tax on the paychecks of workers in the state.

In 2025, governor Bob Ferguson and John Braun, the Republican leader of the Washington State Senate, joined together to support a ballot measure that would allow the state to invest in the stock market using funds from the WA Care Fund. After the initial announcement, it received support and opposition from both parties.

== Endorsements ==
Yes

Statewide officials

- Bob Ferguson, governor of Washington (2025–present) (Democratic)
- Mike Pellicciotti, state treasurer (2021–present) (Democratic)
- Duane Davidson, former state treasurer (2017–2021) (Republican)

State legislators

- 11 Republican state senators, including:
  - John Braun, minority leader of the Washington State Senate (2020–present) and state senator from the 20th district (2013–present)
- 13 Democratic state senators
- 23 Democratic state representatives

Labor unions

- Service Employees International Union 775
- SEIU 1199NW
- Professional & Technical Employees Local 17
- SEIU6 Property Services Northwest
- United Food and Commercial Workers Local 3000
- Washington State Labor Council
- Washington State Nurses Association

Organizations

- AARP
- Economic Opportunity Institute
- Planned Parenthood Alliance Advocates
- National Organization for Women Seattle
- Snohomish County Indivisible
- Fuse Washington
- ALS Association
- National Multiple Sclerosis Society
- Northwest Progressive Institute

Political parties

- Washington State Democratic Party

Newspapers

- Everett Herald
- The Columbian
- The Seattle Times
- The Stranger
- Tri-City Herald
- Union-Bulletin
No

State legislators

- Peter Abbarno, state senator from the 20th district (2021–present) (Republican)
- Bob Hasegawa, state senator from the 11th district (2013–present) (Democratic)
- Joe Schmick, state representative from the 9th district (2007–present) (Republican)
- Mark Schoesler, state senator from the 9th district (2005–present) (Republican)

== Polling ==
Poll source	Date(s) administered	Sample size (Note: Key: A – all adults RV – registered voters LV – likely voters V – unclear)	Margin of error	Yes	No	Undecided
Emerson College (Note: Poll sponsored by the Northwest Progressive Institute)	October 20–21, 2025	600 (LV)	± 4.0%	47%	33%	21%

== Results ==
The ballot measure was approved by voters.

2025 Washington Resolution 8201
Choice	Votes	%
For	1,105,304	57.82
Against	806,299	42.18
Total	1,911,603	100.00
Source: Washington Secretary of State

=== By county ===
County results
County	Yes		No		Margin		Total votes
County	#	%	#	%	#	%	Total votes
Adams	1,094	42.21%	1,498	57.79%	-404	-15.59%	2,592
Asotin	2,694	44.32%	3,384	55.68%	-690	-11.35%	6,078
Benton	17,884	42.53%	24,169	57.47%	-6,285	-14.95%	42,053
Chelan	8,995	49.16%	9,302	50.84%	-307	-1.68%	18,297
Clallam	12,755	48.78%	13,391	51.22%	-636	-2.43%	26,146
Clark	64,033	53.44%	55,783	46.56%	8,250	6.89%	119,816
Columbia	536	36.44%	935	63.56%	-399	-27.12%	1,471
Cowlitz	10,250	41.39%	14,512	58.61%	-4,262	-17.21%	24,762
Douglas	3,560	39.26%	5,508	60.74%	-1,948	-21.48%	9,068
Ferry	628	32.51%	1,304	67.49%	-676	-34.99%	1,932
Franklin	4,480	41.48%	6,320	58.52%	-1,840	-17.04%	10,800
Garfield	367	39.08%	572	60.92%	-205	-21.83%	939
Grant	5,811	37.64%	9,629	62.36%	-3,818	-24.73%	15,440
Grays Harbor	6,391	41.30%	9,085	58.70%	-2,694	-17.41%	15,476
Island	13,217	50.69%	12,859	49.31%	358	1.37%	26,076
Jefferson	8,689	58.80%	6,088	41.20%	2,601	17.60%	14,777
King	446,401	71.07%	181,699	28.93%	264,702	42.14%	628,100
Kitsap	44,396	53.67%	38,317	46.33%	6,079	7.35%	82,713
Kittitas	5,942	45.82%	7,027	54.18%	-1,085	-8.37%	12,969
Klickitat	2,867	46.51%	3,297	53.49%	-430	-6.98%	6,164
Lewis	7,770	39.23%	12,037	60.77%	-4,267	-21.54%	19,807
Lincoln	1,336	37.09%	2,266	62.91%	-930	-25.82%	3,602
Mason	7,935	44.51%	9,893	55.49%	-1,958	-10.98%	17,828
Okanogan	4,323	43.99%	5,504	56.01%	-1,181	-12.02%	9,827
Pacific	3,409	45.33%	4,111	54.67%	-702	-9.34%	7,520
Pend Oreille	1,394	36.64%	2,411	63.36%	-1,017	-26.73%	3,805
Pierce	98,941	53.16%	87,163	46.84%	11,778	6.33%	186,104
San Juan	5,045	62.42%	3,037	37.58%	2,008	24.85%	8,082
Skagit	17,373	50.52%	17,016	49.48%	357	1.04%	34,389
Skamania	1,347	43.31%	1,763	56.69%	-416	-13.38%	3,110
Snohomish	99,495	54.05%	84,583	45.95%	14,912	8.10%	184,078
Spokane	73,650	51.48%	69,402	48.52%	4,248	2.97%	143,052
Stevens	4,257	32.99%	8,647	67.01%	-4,390	-34.02%	12,904
Thurston	46,252	56.06%	36,249	43.94%	10,003	12.12%	82,501
Wahkiakum	770	42.52%	1,041	57.48%	-271	-14.96%	1,811
Walla Walla	6,802	49.83%	6,848	50.17%	-46	-0.34%	13,650
Whatcom	42,185	61.26%	26,677	38.74%	15,508	22.52%	68,862
Whitman	4,999	50.76%	4,850	49.24%	149	1.51%	9,849
Yakima	17,031	48.45%	18,122	51.55%	-1,091	-3.10%	35,153
Totals	1,105,304	57.82%	806,299	42.18%	299,005	15.64%	1,911,603

== Note ==
Partisan clients
