= Richard Lathim =

American politician

Sheriff of Franklin County
- In office November 1986 – December, 2014
- Succeeded by: James D. Raymond

Personal details
- Born: Richard Wayne Lathim; December 15, 1955 (age 70) Franklin County, Washington, U.S.
- Party: Republican
- Spouse: Mary Gundersen
- Education: Washington State University (Police Science & Administration)

Richard Lathim is an American politician who served as the Sheriff of Franklin County, Washington. Lathim is a veteran of the Franklin County Sheriff's Office, serving seven terms as Sheriff from 1986 to 2014, until being succeeded by James (Jim) Raymond in the 2014 elections.

== Early life and education ==
Lathim is a native of Franklin County, Washington. He attended Washington State University for Police Science & Administration, and he has taken several other police-oriented courses, such as Basic Law Enforcement Academy, the Law Enforcement Command College, and Executive Level Law Enforcement Certification.

== Career ==
Lathim retired December 31, 2014 after 37 years of law enforcement service, the last 28 years as the elected Sheriff of Franklin County. After attending Washington State University and receiving a degree in Police Science & Administration, Lathim worked from 1977 to 1978 as a Police Officer in the Connell Police Department, as a Deputy Sheriff in the Franklin County Sheriff's Office from 1978 to 1986, and as the elected Sheriff of Franklin County from 1986 to 2014. In May, 2015, he announced that he would be seeking appointment to the Washington House of Representatives after Representative Susan Fagan resigned May 1 after allegations that she falsified travel forms. Mary Dye of Pomeroy was selected by 13 of the 17 commissioners to replace Susan Fagan as the new state representative for District 9, over the other candidates Richard Lathim and Patrick Guettner. Lathim decided to run for Representative of District 9 later that year in 2015, running against Rep. Mary Dye. Richard Lathim was defeated by Mary Dye with 35.3 percent of the votes, while Dye won with 64.6 percent of the votes. Richard Lathim is the CEO of Rocking L Land and Livestock, LLC.
