= Pullman, Washington =

City in the United States

- City
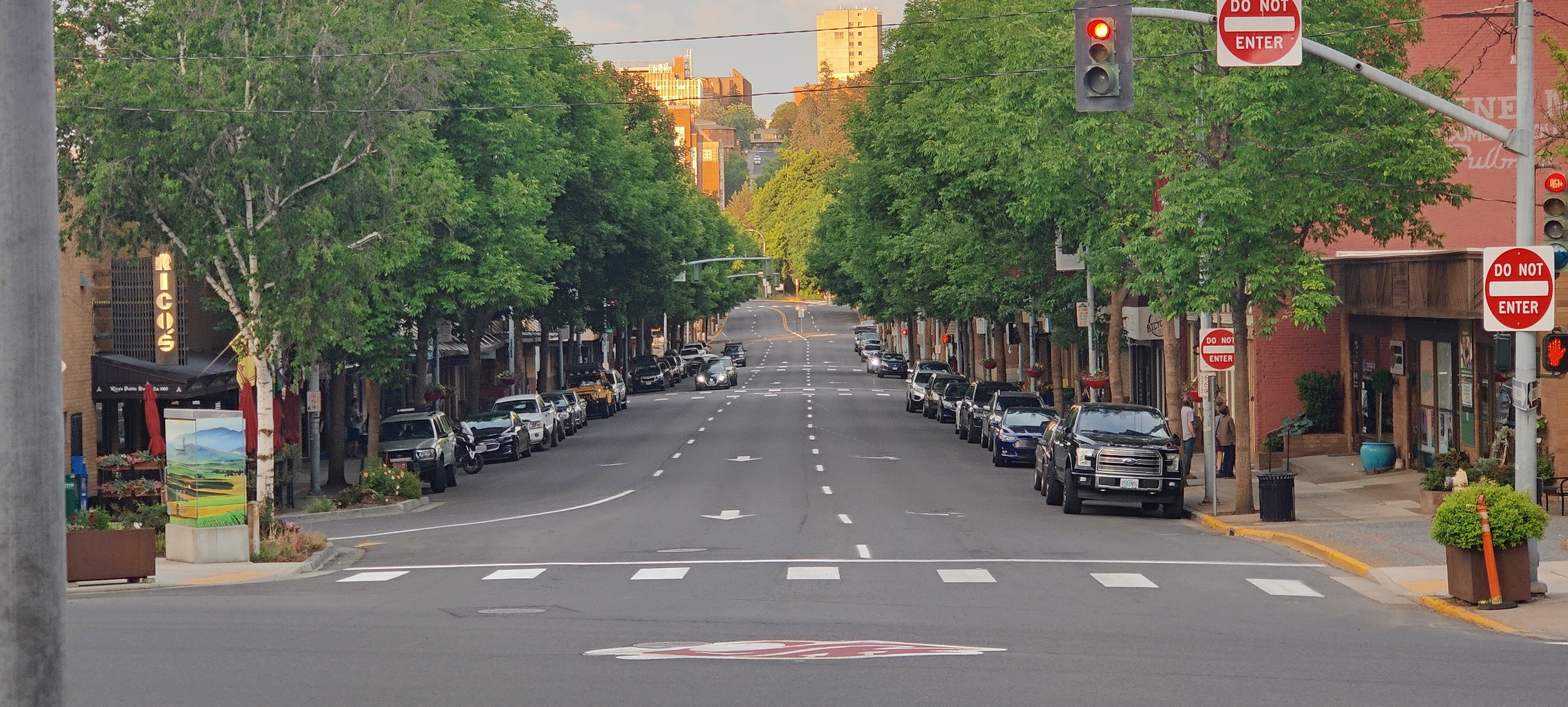
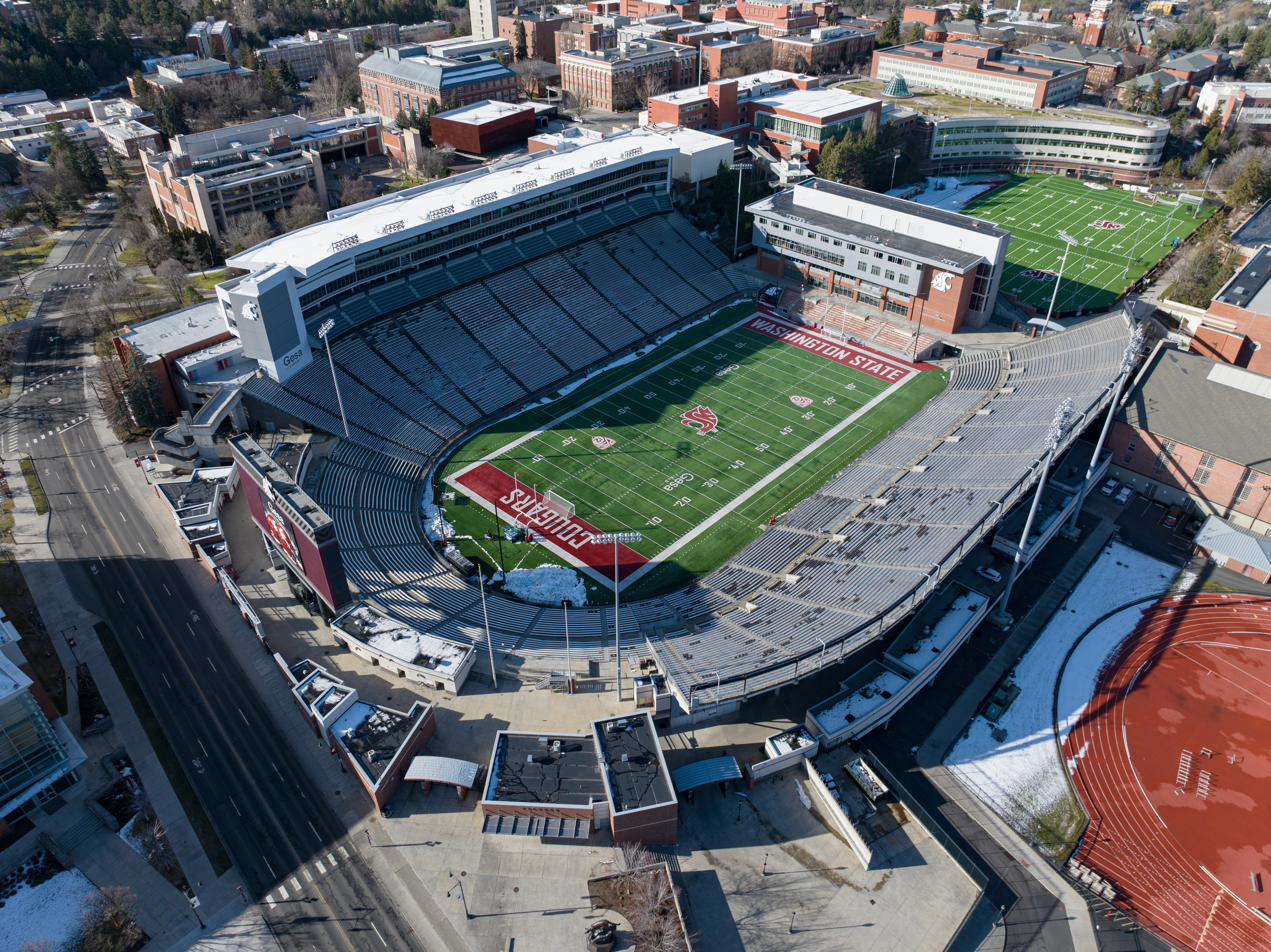
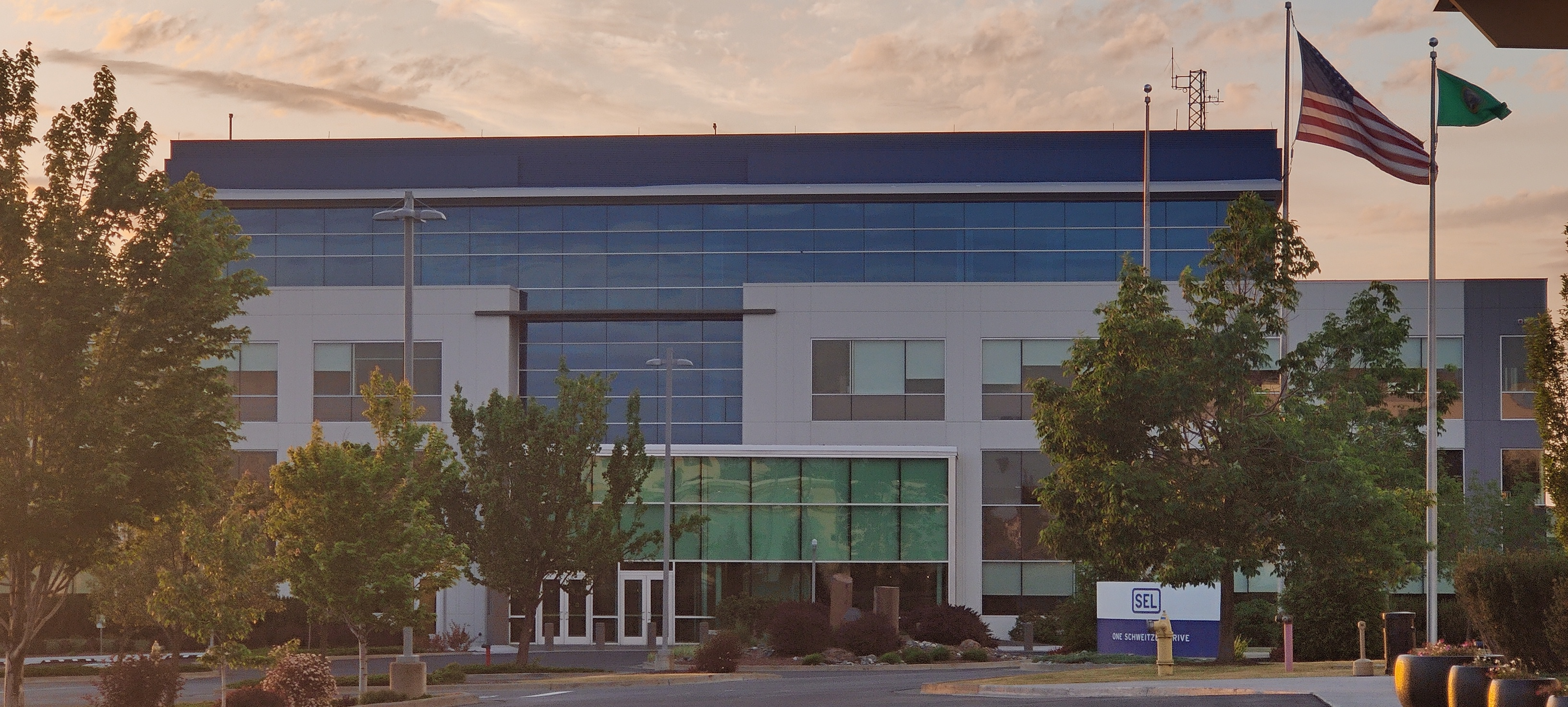
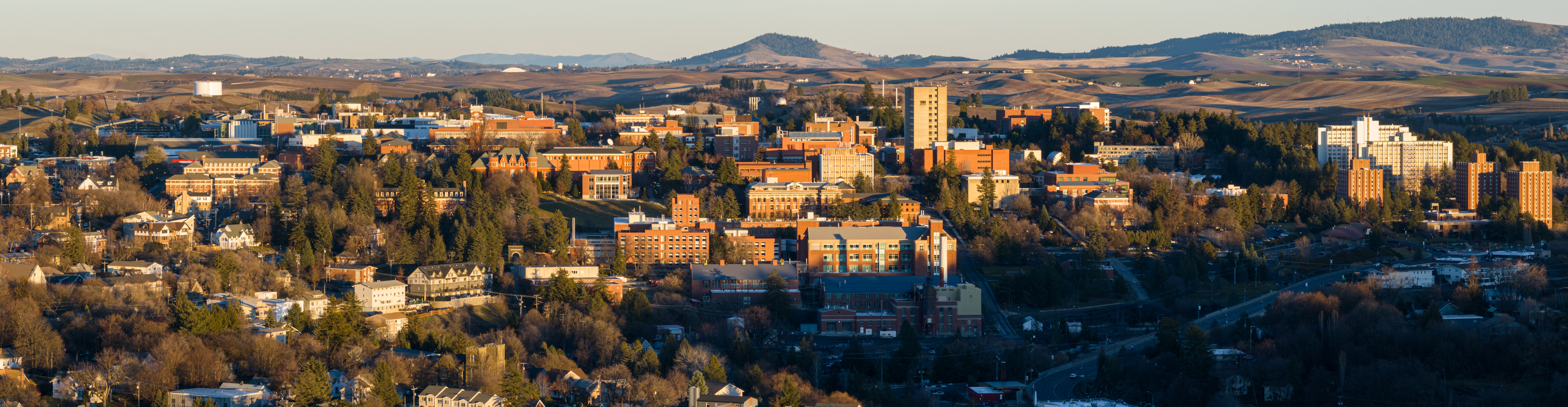
- Main Street Martin Stadium Schweitzer Engineering Laboratories headquarters Washington State University
- Nickname: The Lentil Capital
- Motto: High Tech, Higher Education, Highest Quality of Life
- The location of Pullman in Washington

- Location within the United States
- Coordinates: 46°44′00″N 117°10′07″W
- Country: United States
- State: Washington
- County: Whitman
- Incorporated: April 11, 1888
- Named for: Was named Three Forks, for the three creeks which form South Fork Palouse River. Renamed Pullman in 1881 after the railroad-car manufacturer and engineer George Pullman.

Government
  - Type: Strong Mayor–Council
  - Mayor: Francis Benjamin

Area
  - Total: 11.12 sq mi (28.81 km^{2})
  - Land: 11.12 sq mi (28.81 km^{2})
  - Water: 0 sq mi (0.00 km^{2})
- Elevation: 2,513 ft (766 m)

Population (2020)
  - Total: 32,901
  - Estimate (2024): 33,543
  - Density: 2,920/sq mi (1,128/km^{2})
- Time zone: UTC–8 (Pacific (PST))
  - Summer (DST): UTC–7 (PDT)
- ZIP Codes: 99163, 99164
- Area code: 509
- FIPS code: 53-56625
- GNIS feature ID: 2411502
- Website: pullman-wa.gov

Pullman is the most populous city in Whitman County, located in southeastern Washington within the Palouse region of the Pacific Northwest. The population was 32,901 at the 2020 census, and estimated to be 33,543 in 2024. Originally founded as Three Forks, the city was renamed after industrialist George Pullman in 1881.

Pullman is noted as a fertile agricultural area known for its many miles of rolling hills and the production of wheat and legumes. It is home to Washington State University, a public research land-grant university, and the international headquarters of Schweitzer Engineering Laboratories. Pullman is eight miles (13 km) from Moscow, Idaho, home to the University of Idaho, and is served by the Pullman–Moscow Regional Airport.

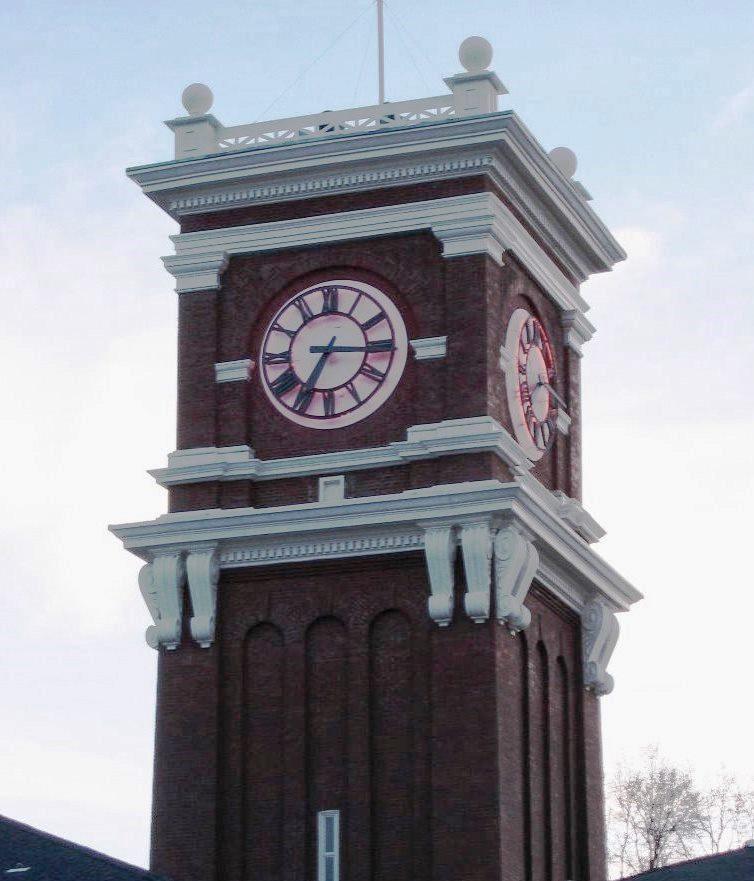
Bryan Tower on the Pullman WSU campus at twilight

== History ==
In 1876, about five years after European-American settlers established Whitman County on November 29, 1871, Bolin Farr arrived in Pullman. He camped at the confluence of Dry Flat Creek and Missouri Flat Creek on the bank of the Palouse River. Within the year, Dan McKenzie and William Ellsworth arrived to stake claims for adjoining land. The location was called Three Forks although this was never an official name for the town. In the spring of 1881, Orville Stewart opened a general store and Bolin Farr platted about 10 acres (4.0 ha) of his land for a town. Daniel McKenzie, Bolin Farr, and Orville Stewart held a session one day to decide upon a name for their trading post, and after a lively discussion, the decision was made unanimous that it should be Pullman, which had been suggested by Orville Stewart. On September 30, 1881, Orville Stewart applied for a Post Office using the name Pullman. On October 28, 1881, the Palouse Gazette in Colfax, WA announced that a new town had been christened with the name Pullman at the location formerly known as Three Forks.

Pullman was incorporated on April 11, 1888, with a population of about 250–300 people. The city's original name, Three Forks, referred to the three small rivers that converge there: Missouri Flat Creek, Dry Fork, and the South Fork of the Palouse River. In 1884, Dan McKenzie and Charles Moore (of Moscow) replatted the site, which had been named for American industrialist George Pullman.

On March 28, 1890, the Washington State Legislature established the state's land grant college, but did not designate a location. Pullman leaders were determined to secure the new college and offered 160 acres (0.65 km^{2}) of land for its campus. Idaho Territory had established its land grant college in 1889; the University of Idaho was to be in neighboring Moscow. On April 18, 1891, the site selection commission appointed by Washington's governor chose Pullman. On January 13, 1892, the institution opened with 59 students under the name Washington Agricultural College and School of Science. It was renamed the State College of Washington in 1905, more commonly known as "Washington State College," and became Washington State University in 1959.

In 1961, Pullman became a non-chartered code city under the mayor–council form of government. The city has an elected mayor with an elected seven-member council and an appointed administrative officer, the city administrator.

== Geography ==
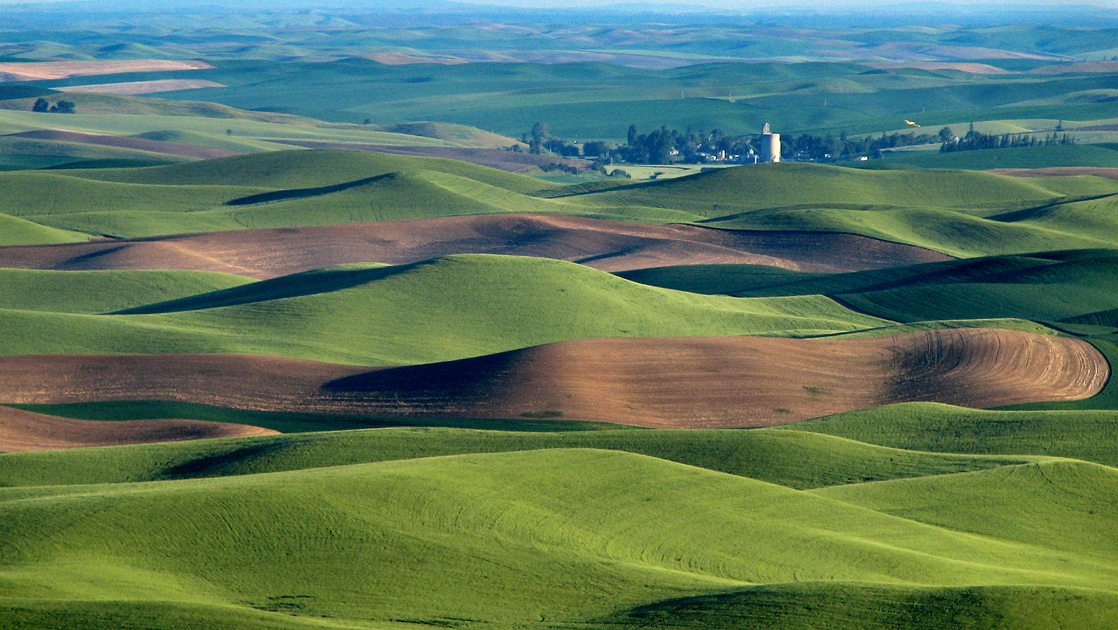
The hilly terrain of the Palouse, which surrounds Pullman

According to the United States Census Bureau, the city of Pullman has a total area of 11.12 square miles (28.8 km^{2}), all land. The city is in the eastern part of Whitman County in southeastern Washington, approximately 65 miles (105 km) south of Spokane and 32 miles (51 km) north of Lewiston, Idaho.

The city is situated across several loess hills which characterize the Palouse Prairie, formed from windblown sediment over an estimated period of over one million years. This prairie region, the Palouse, is noteworthy for its fertile rolling hills where winter and spring wheat, barley, canola, lentils, and peas are grown. These hills provide a variety of elevations across the city, from 2,342 to 2,575 ft (714 to 785 m) above sea level. Downtown Pullman is situated in a valley between these hills. Within the Pullman city limits, the Missouri Flat Creek and Paradise Creek both join the South Fork of the Palouse River. Pullman sits in the watersheds of the Snake River and the Columbia River.

Pullman is situated across four major hills which divide the city into nearly equal quarters. These are:

- Military Hill, north of the Palouse River and west of North Grand Avenue
- Pioneer Hill, south of Main Street and the downtown area, and east of South Grand Avenue
- Sunnyside Hill, south of Davis Way and west of South Grand Avenue
- College Hill, north of Main Street and east of North Grand Avenue

Military Hill is named for the Pullman Military College that opened its doors in 1891 and burned down in 1893.

=== Climate ===
Pullman has a warm-summer Mediterranean climate (Köppen: Csb). This climate is typified by hot, dry summers followed by cold, wet winters with short transitional seasons in between. Due to the rain shadow effect of the Cascade Range to its west, clear skies occur regularly throughout the year and rainfall is drastically less frequent in comparison to cities west of the mountains. Clouds of any variety are especially scant between June and September, which contributes to a diurnal temperature variation that is much higher during the summer compared to winter. Pullman has an annual average of 20.41 inches (518 mm) of precipitation.

Climate data for Pullman–Moscow Regional Airport, Washington (1991–2020 normals, extremes 1893–present (Note: Official records for Pullman were maintained at two locations near the city from January 1893 to June 6, 1998, and, since June 7, 1998, have been kept at Pullman–Moscow Regional Airport. Data coverage at the two pre-airport locations was more sporadic.))
Month	Jan	Feb	Mar	Apr	May	Jun	Jul	Aug	Sep	Oct	Nov	Dec	Year
Record high °F (°C)	59 (15)	66 (19)	75 (24)	88 (31)	94 (34)	106 (41)	104 (40)	110 (43)	100 (38)	90 (32)	73 (23)	64 (18)	110 (43)
Mean maximum °F (°C)	49.8 (9.9)	53.5 (11.9)	63.7 (17.6)	73.6 (23.1)	82.7 (28.2)	88.4 (31.3)	96.3 (35.7)	98.0 (36.7)	91.3 (32.9)	77.5 (25.3)	60.1 (15.6)	49.7 (9.8)	98.8 (37.1)
Mean daily maximum °F (°C)	37.6 (3.1)	41.6 (5.3)	49.3 (9.6)	56.4 (13.6)	65.4 (18.6)	71.9 (22.2)	83.1 (28.4)	83.4 (28.6)	74.2 (23.4)	59.2 (15.1)	44.7 (7.1)	36.6 (2.6)	58.6 (14.8)
Daily mean °F (°C)	32.7 (0.4)	35.4 (1.9)	41.1 (5.1)	46.8 (8.2)	54.5 (12.5)	59.8 (15.4)	67.0 (19.4)	66.9 (19.4)	59.8 (15.4)	48.4 (9.1)	38.6 (3.7)	31.8 (−0.1)	48.6 (9.2)
Mean daily minimum °F (°C)	27.8 (−2.3)	29.2 (−1.6)	32.9 (0.5)	37.2 (2.9)	43.7 (6.5)	47.7 (8.7)	50.9 (10.5)	50.4 (10.2)	45.4 (7.4)	37.6 (3.1)	32.5 (0.3)	26.9 (−2.8)	38.5 (3.6)
Mean minimum °F (°C)	7.4 (−13.7)	11.0 (−11.7)	19.0 (−7.2)	26.3 (−3.2)	30.8 (−0.7)	36.4 (2.4)	40.5 (4.7)	38.7 (3.7)	31.3 (−0.4)	21.5 (−5.8)	15.0 (−9.4)	8.1 (−13.3)	−2.3 (−19.1)
Record low °F (°C)	−29 (−34)	−24 (−31)	−9 (−23)	6 (−14)	23 (−5)	29 (−2)	32 (0)	32 (0)	20 (−7)	4 (−16)	−14 (−26)	−32 (−36)	−32 (−36)
Average precipitation inches (mm)	2.67 (68)	1.94 (49)	2.05 (52)	1.96 (50)	1.81 (46)	1.22 (31)	0.44 (11)	0.48 (12)	0.65 (17)	1.80 (46)	2.62 (67)	2.77 (70)	20.41 (519)
Average snowfall inches (cm)	9.6 (24)	4.8 (12)	2.5 (6.4)	0.7 (1.8)	0.1 (0.25)	0.0 (0.0)	0.0 (0.0)	0.0 (0.0)	0.0 (0.0)	0.1 (0.25)	4.6 (12)	10.3 (26)	32.7 (82.7)
Average precipitation days (≥ 0.01 in)	14.0	11.5	12.3	11.1	9.6	8.3	3.8	3.5	4.6	9.0	13.6	13.9	115.2
Average snowy days (≥ 0.1 in)	4.8	3.4	1.9	0.4	0.1	0.0	0.0	0.0	0.0	0.1	2.6	4.9	18.2
Source 1: NOAA
Source 2: National Weather Service

== Economy ==
Washington State University is the largest employer in both Pullman and Whitman County.

As part of the Palouse Knowledge Corridor, companies associated with an expanding high-tech industry are at the city's north end, anchored by Schweitzer Engineering Laboratories (SEL), the largest private employer in the region. The lab company was founded by Edmund Schweitzer, a Ph.D. graduate of WSU. SEL and other firms are within the 107-acre (0.43 km^{2}) Pullman Industrial Park, run by the Port of Whitman County.

Pullman Regional Hospital opened on Bishop Boulevard in late 2004; its predecessor, Pullman Memorial Hospital, was on the WSU campus and shared facilities with the student health center.

=== Agriculture ===
Pullman is situated within the Palouse region which since the 1980s has been a leading producer of lentils, split peas, and wheat in the United States.

Pullman is also home to the Northwest sustainable Agroecosystems Research Unit that is administered by the USDA Agricultural Research Service. It was established to identify and create solutions for water erosion of agricultural lands.

== Demographics ==
Historical population
Census	Pop.	Note	%±
1890	868		—
1900	1,308		50.7%
1910	2,602		98.9%
1920	2,440		−6.2%
1930	3,322		36.1%
1940	4,417		33.0%
1950	12,022		172.2%
1960	12,957		7.8%
1970	20,509		58.3%
1980	23,579		15.0%
1990	23,478		−0.4%
2000	24,675		5.1%
2010	29,799		20.8%
2020	32,901		10.4%
2024 (est.)	33,543		2.0%
U.S. Decennial Census; 2020 Census

In 2011, Bloomberg Businessweek selected Pullman as the "Best Place to Raise Kids" in Washington. Factors included affordability, safety, a family-friendly lifestyle, the quality of Pullman High School, the presence of Washington State University, and the natural environment of the area.

=== 2020 census ===
As of the 2020 census, there were 32,901 people, 12,185 households, and 4,640 families in Pullman. The median age was 22.7 years; 13.1% of residents were under the age of 18, 45.7% were from 18 to 24, 23.8% were from 25 to 44, 10.6% were from 45 to 64, and 6.7% were 65 years of age or older. For every 100 females, there were 98.7 males, and for every 100 females age 18 and over there were 98.4 males.

The population density was 3,010.4 per square mile (1,162.3/km^{2}). There were 13,645 housing units at an average density of 1,248.5 units per square mile (482.0 units/km^{2}).

Of the 12,185 households, 19.5% had children under the age of 18 living in them, 27.9% were married couples living together, 32.5% had a male householder with no spouse or partner present, and 31.9% had a female householder with no spouse or partner present. About 37.7% of all households were made up of individuals and 5.2% had someone living alone who was 65 years of age or older. The average household size was 2.2 and the average family size was 2.9.

There were 13,645 housing units, of which 10.7% were vacant. The homeowner vacancy rate was 1.6% and the rental vacancy rate was 8.5%.

Pullman, Washington – Racial and ethnic composition Note: the US Census treats Hispanic/Latino as an ethnic category. This table excludes Latinos from the racial categories and assigns them to a separate category. Hispanics/Latinos may be of any race.
Race / Ethnicity (NH = Non-Hispanic)	Pop 2000	Pop 2010	Pop 2020	% 2000	% 2010	% 2020
White alone (NH)	20,070	22,745	22,044	81.34%	76.33%	67.00%
Black or African American alone (NH)	581	662	1,101	2.35%	2.22%	3.35%
Native American or Alaska Native alone (NH)	147	178	164	0.60%	0.60%	0.50%
Asian alone (NH)	2,083	3,328	3,500	8.44%	11.17%	10.64%
Native Hawaiian or Pacific Islander alone (NH)	91	85	122	0.37%	0.29%	0.37%
Other race alone (NH)	33	33	193	0.13%	0.11%	0.59%
Mixed race or Multiracial (NH)	717	1,148	2,221	2.91%	3.85%	6.75%
Hispanic or Latino (any race)	953	1,620	3,556	3.86%	5.44%	10.81%
Total	24,675	29,799	32,901	100.00%	100.00%	100.00%

=== 2010 census ===
As of the 2010 census, there were 29,799 people, 11,029 households, and 3,898 families living in the city. The population density was 3,016.1 inhabitants per square mile (1,164.5/km^{2}). There were 11,966 housing units at an average density of 1,211.1 units per square mile (467.6 units/km^{2}). The racial makeup of the city was 79.3% White, 2.3% African American, 0.7% Native American, 11.2% Asian, 0.3% Pacific Islander, 1.9% from other races, and 4.4% from two or more races. Hispanic or Latino residents of any race were 5.4% of the population.

There were 11,029 households, of which 17.1% had children under the age of 18 living with them, 28.5% were married couples living together, 4.7% had a female householder with no husband present, 2.1% had a male householder with no wife present, and 64.7% were non-families. 34.5% of all households were made up of individuals, and 4.4% had someone living alone who was 65 years of age or older. The average household size was 2.18 and the average family size was 2.88.

The median age in the city was 22.3 years. 11.3% of residents were under the age of 18; 51.8% were between the ages of 18 and 24; 21.7% were from 25 to 44; 10.5% were from 45 to 64; and 4.7% were 65 years of age or older. The gender makeup of the city was 51.3% male and 48.7% female.

== Government and politics ==
The City of Pullman is classified as a code city, organized under a mayor-council form of government.

The longest-serving mayor in Pullman's history was Glenn Johnson who served five terms as mayor. Those 20 years began January 2004, following his election in November 2003. He served through the end of December 2023.

== Culture ==
Since 1989, Pullman has been home to the National Lentil Festival, a major community event celebrating the lentil legume grown in the surrounding Palouse region. The festival includes a lentil cook-off, Friday-night street fair, Saturday parade and music in the park, and more. It is held in Reaney Park on the August weekend before fall semester classes start at WSU.

=== Sports ===
College sports are popular in Pullman; most support is centered on the Washington State Cougars who compete in the Pac-12 Conference in NCAA Division I. The football team plays at Martin Stadium, and their in-state rivals are the Washington Huskies with whom the Cougars play an annual rivalry game, the Apple Cup. The women's and men's basketball teams play at Beasley Coliseum, and the baseball team at Bailey–Brayton Field. Mooberry Track hosts track and field, and historic Bohler Gymnasium (1928) is the home of women's volleyball. The challenging 18-hole Palouse Ridge Golf Club opened in 2008, an overdue upgrade of the nine-hole WSU course.

The Greyhounds of Pullman High School compete in WIAA Class 2A in District Seven. Historic rivals are the Clarkston Bantams to the south and the Moscow Bears, in adjacent Idaho.

=== Theatre ===
- Regional Theatre of the Palouse
- Pullman Civic Theatre

=== Music ===
There are several concert series and performing arts organizations based in Pullman. The Washington Idaho Symphony performs approximately six symphonic concerts each season with three chamber concerts through the Silverthorne Chamber Series. The Palouse Choral Society services the greater Palouse region and has approximately five concerts per year. The Washington State University School of Music provides over 100 concerts throughout the school year that feature guest artists, faculty, and students. The larger events include the Festival of Contemporary Artists in Music, the Holiday Celebration, and the outdoor summer music series Fridays at the Clock.

== Education ==
The Pullman School District consists of the following schools:

- Franklin Elementary School
- Jefferson Elementary School
- Sunnyside Elementary School
- Kamiak Elementary School
- Lincoln Middle School
- Pullman High School

The city's only public high school, Pullman High School (PHS) has about 700 students. It is on Military Hill. Its mascot for its athletic teams is the greyhound. PHS offers honors and advanced placement courses, along with Running Start course work through WSU and Spokane Falls Community College.

=== Washington State University ===
Pullman is the site of the flagship campus of Washington State University (WSU), a member of the Pac-12 Conference (Pac-12) in NCAA Division I. WSU is the second-largest university in the state of Washington, and is well known for its veterinary medicine, business, architecture, engineering, agriculture, pharmacy, and communications schools.

== Transportation ==
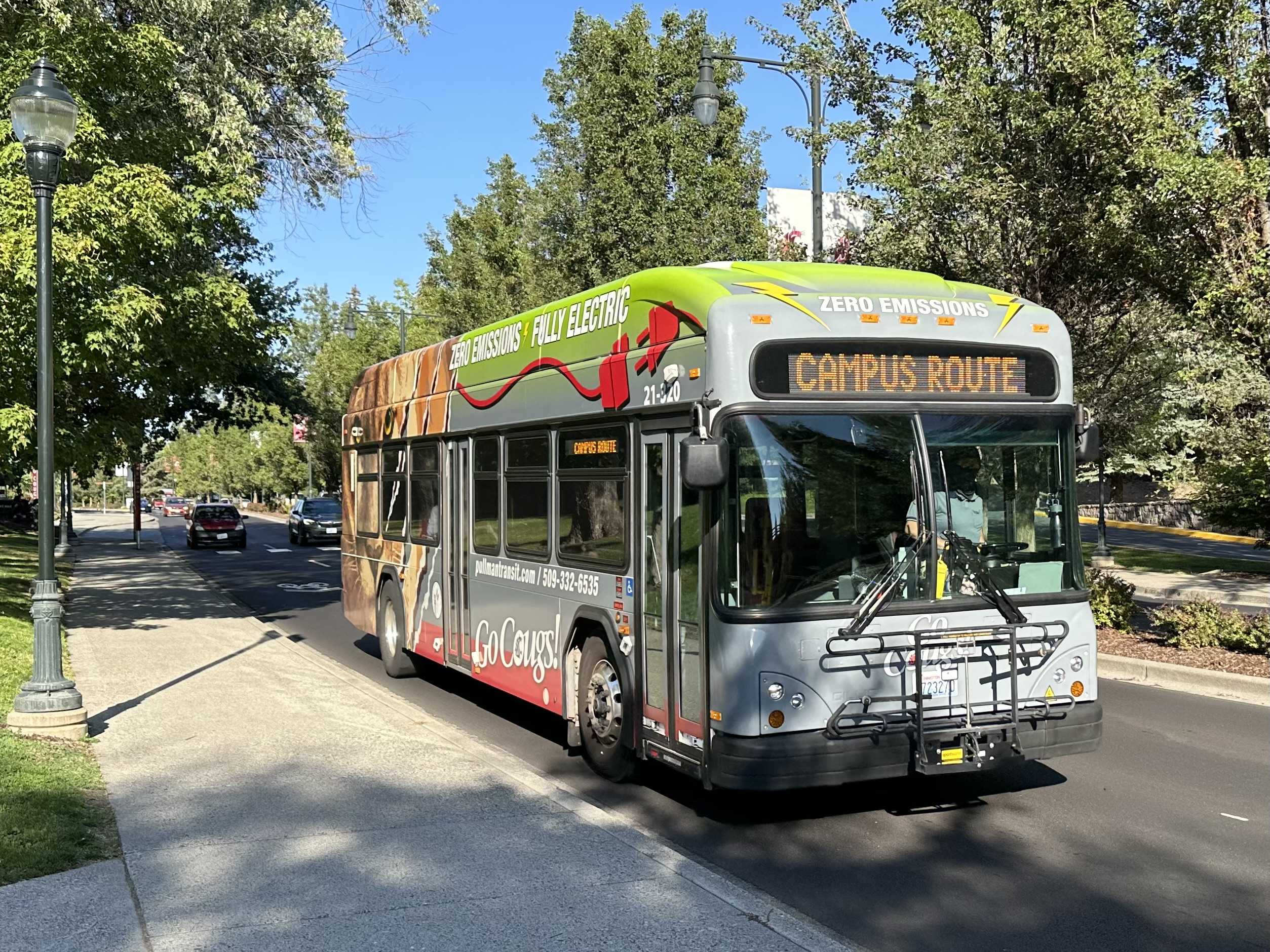
A Gillig Low Floor operated by Pullman Transit

Pullman is located near the junction of U.S. Route 195 (US 195) and State Route 27, which both travel north towards the Spokane area and serve towns in the Palouse. US 195 also continues south towards Lewiston, Idaho. State Route 270 provides east–west connections between Pullman and Moscow, Idaho, and shares the same corridor as the Bill Chipman Palouse Trail.

The city is also served by Pullman Transit, which provides bus service for residents and WSU students who do not live on campus. WSU students are able to ride without fares by presenting their student ID card, as the university includes a transit fee in tuition. The agency has also provided additional shuttle services during major events at the Washington State University campus, including home football games. Pullman is also served by intercity buses to Spokane. An inter-campus shuttle bus between WSU and the University of Idaho in Moscow was operated by a private company until 2011; proposals for a publicly-run replacement have been discussed by Pullman Transit and Smart Transit, the public transit service in Moscow.

Pullman is served by the Pullman–Moscow Regional Airport, situated two miles (3 km) east of Pullman and four miles (6.5 km) west of Moscow. Alaska Airlines has two daily flights from the airport to Seattle–Tacoma year-round and five flights a week to Boise during the school year. The nearest major airport is Spokane International Airport, which is also used by travelers to and from the Pullman area.

== Notable people ==
- Michael Baumgartner, U.S. representative for Washington
- Pat Beach, NFL tight end for eleven seasons for the Baltimore and Indianapolis Colts, Philadelphia Eagles, and Arizona Cardinals
- John Elway, Hall of Fame NFL quarterback for the Denver Broncos, was a resident for four years and attended Pullman High School as a freshman
- John M. Fabian, former NASA astronaut, graduated from Pullman High School and WSU
- Susan Fagan, politician. Member of Washington House of Representatives.
- Jean Hegland, novelist, born and raised in Pullman
- William La Follette, U.S. Congressman, lived in Pullman
- Gary Larson, cartoonist, graduated from Washington State University in Pullman
- Young Jean Lee, playwright, raised in Pullman
- James Mattis, former USMC general and the 26th Secretary of Defense
- Ron C. Mittelhammer, former director of the School of Economic Sciences and former president of the American Agricultural Economics Association
- E. G. Patterson, State representative
- Timm Rosenbach, NFL quarterback for the Arizona Cardinals and New Orleans Saints; played at Pullman High School and Washington State
- Edmund O. Schweitzer III, founder of Schweitzer Engineering Laboratories
- Kirk Triplett, three-time winner on the PGA Tour and member of the 2000 President's Cup team, 1980 graduate of Pullman High School
