= Washington's 9th legislative district =

American legislative district

Coordinates: 46.82°N 118.12°W

Washington 9th legislative district map

Washington's 9th legislative district is one of forty-nine districts in Washington state for representation in the state legislature. The sprawling rural district includes all of Asotin, Columbia, Garfield, Lincoln, and Whitman counties as well as parts of Adams and Spokane counties. The district resides in the extreme southeast of the state, bordering Oregon to the south and Idaho to the east.

The mostly rural district is represented by state senator Mark Schoesler and state representatives Mary Dye (position 1) and Joe Schmick (position 2), all Republicans.

== Past legislators ==
=== Statehood-1932 ===
During this period, the state senate and state house districts were geographically distinct.

| Year | Senate | | House | |
| Year | Senator | Senate District Geography | House Position 1 | House District Geography |
|---|---|---|---|---|
| 1st (1889-1890) | J. M. Snow (R) | Douglas and Yakima counties | | |
| 2nd (1891-1892) | George T. Thompson (R) | Adams, Franklin, and Walla Walla (part) | House District Established | Garfield County |
| 2nd (1891-1892) | George T. Thompson (R) | Adams, Franklin, and Walla Walla (part) | James Palmer (R) | Garfield County |
| 3rd (1893-1894) | John L. Roberts (R) | Adams, Franklin, and Walla Walla (part) | F. W. D. Mays (D) | Garfield County |
| 4th (1895-1896) | John L. Roberts (R) | Adams, Franklin, and Walla Walla (part) | A. E. Allen (P.P) | Garfield County |
| 5th (1897-1898) | John I. Yeend (P.P) | Adams, Franklin, and Walla Walla (part) | James Parker (Pop.) | Garfield County |
| 6th (1899-1900) | John I. Yeend (P.P) | Adams, Franklin, and Walla Walla (part) | Charles M. Baldwin (R) | Garfield County |
| 7th (1901-1902) | Oliver T. Cornwell (R) | Adams, Franklin, and Walla Walla (part) | W. L. Howell (D) | Garfield County |
| 8th (1903-1904) | Oscar E. Hailey (R) | Adams, Franklin, and Walla Walla (part) | G. W. R. Peaslee (R) | Garfield County |
| 9th (1905-1906) | H. M. Boone (R) | Whitman County (part) | H. C. Fulton (R) | Asotin County |
| 10th (1907-1908) | H. M. Boone (R) | Whitman County (part) | H. C. Fulton (R) | Asotin County |
| 11th (1909-1910) | Joseph W. Arrasmith (R) | Whitman County (part) | Elmer Halsey (R) | Asotin County |
| 12th (1911-1912) | Joseph W. Arrasmith (R) | Whitman County (part) | Elmer Halsey (R) | Asotin County |
| 13th (1913-1914) | W. C. McCoy (R) | Whitman County (part) | Elmer Halsey (R) | Asotin County |
| 14th (1915-1916) | W. C. McCoy (R) | Whitman County (part) | Elmer Halsey (R) | Asotin County |
| 15th (1917-1918) | W. W. Brand (D) (Note: Unclear as to the reason he did not serve a full term.) | Whitman County (part) | Elmer Halsey (R) | Asotin County |
| 16th (1919-1920) | W. C. McCoy (R) (Note: Elected to serve unexpired term) | Whitman County (part) | John L. Wormell (D) | Asotin County |
| 17th (1921-1922) | C. A. Couplin (R) (Note: Elected and subsequently resigned without serving) | Whitman County (part) | H. C. Fulton (R) | Asotin County |
| 17th (1921-1922) | Frank J. Wilmer (R) | Whitman County (part) | H. C. Fulton (R) | Asotin County |
| 18th (1923-1924) | Frank J. Wilmer (R) | Whitman County (part) | Elmer Halsey (R) | Asotin County |
| 19th (1925-1926) | Frank J. Wilmer (R) | Whitman County (part) | Elmer Halsey (R) | Asotin County |
| 20th (1927-1928) | Frank J. Wilmer (R) | Whitman County (part) | John F. Worum (D) | Asotin County |
| 21st (1929-1930) | Frank J. Wilmer (R) | Whitman County (part) | Henry C. Hartung (R) | Asotin County |
| 22nd (1931-1932) | Frank J. Wilmer (R) | Whitman County (part) | Henry C. Hartung (R) | Asotin County |

=== 1933-Present ===
After the passage of Initiative 57 and the 1930 redistricting cycle, the state senate and state house districts were geographically similar. While some senate districts would occasionally be broken up into house seats A and B, seats A and B were always contained in the Senate district boundaries.

The 9th Legislative district's state senate was composed of house districts 9-A and 9-B from 1967-1972. The senate and house seats were identical geographically from 1933-66 and from 1973 to the present day.

| Year | Senate | House | | District Geography |
| Year | Senator | House Position 1 | House Position 2 | District Geography |
|---|---|---|---|---|
| 23rd (1933-1934) | George W. Roup (D) | Florence W. Myers (D) | W. E. Thompson (D) | Whitman County (part) |
| 24th (1935-1936) | George H. Gannon (D) | Gordon Klemgard (D) | Florence W. Myers (D) | Whitman County |
| 25th (1937-1938) | Gordon Klemgard (D) | Roscoe Cox (D) | Florence W. Myers (D) | Whitman County |
| 26th (1939-1940) | Gordon Klemgard (D) | William L. La Follette (R) | Fred Miller (R) | Whitman County |
| 27th (1941-1942) | Ernest C. Huntley (R) (Note: Resigned Jan. 24, 1949; Appointed to State Tax Commission) | Asa V. Clark (R) (Note: Resigned house seat; Appointed Jan. 24, 1949; Elected Nov. 7, 1950 to serve unexpired term in the state senate) | Fred Miller (R) | Whitman County |
| 28th (1943-1944) | Ernest C. Huntley (R) | Asa V. Clark (R) | Fred Miller (R) | Whitman County |
| 29th (1945-1946) | Ernest C. Huntley (R) | Asa V. Clark (R) | Fred Miller (R) | Whitman County |
| 30th (1947-1948) | Ernest C. Huntley (R) | Asa V. Clark (R) | Fred Miller (R) | Whitman County |
| 31st (1949-1950) | Ernest C. Huntley (R) | Asa V. Clark (R) | J. Chester Gordon (R) | Whitman County |
| 31st (1949-1950) | Asa V. Clark (R) | Marshall A. Neill (R) (Note: Appointed Jan. 24, 1949 to serve unexpired term) | J. Chester Gordon (R) | Whitman County |
| 32nd (1951-1952) | Asa V. Clark (R) | J. Chester Gordon (R) | Marshall A. Neill (R) | Whitman County |
| 33rd (1953-1954) | Asa V. Clark (R) | J. Chester Gordon (R) | Marshall A. Neill (R) | Whitman County |
| 34th (1955-1956) | Asa V. Clark (R) | J. Chester Gordon (R) | Marshall A. Neill (R) | Whitman County |
| 35th (1957-1958) | Marshall A. Neill (R) (Note: Resigned Apr. 24, 1967; Appointed to Washington State Supreme Court) | Robert F. Goldsworthy (R) | Elmer C. Huntley (R) (Note: Resigned Mar. 26, 1965; Appointed to the Highway Commission) | Whitman County |
| 36th (1959-1960) | Marshall A. Neill (R) | Robert F. Goldsworthy (R) | Elmer C. Huntley (R) | Whitman County |
| 37th (1961-1962) | Marshall A. Neill (R) | Robert F. Goldsworthy (R) | Elmer C. Huntley (R) | Whitman County |
| 38th (1963-1964) | Marshall A. Neill (R) | Robert F. Goldsworthy (R) | Elmer C. Huntley (R) | Whitman County |
| 39th (1965-1966) | Marshall A. Neill (R) | Robert F. Goldsworthy (R) | Elmer C. Huntley (R) | Whitman County |
| 39th (1965-1966) | Marshall A. Neill (R) | Robert F. Goldsworthy (R) | William Howard Finch (R) (Note: Appointed Mar. 26, 1965 to serve unexpired term) | Whitman County |
| 40th (1967-1968) | Marshall A. Neill (R) | House District 9-A | House District 9-B | 1965 Redistricting |
| 40th (1967-1968) | Elmer C. Huntley (R) (Note: Appointed Apr. 24, 1967 to serve unexpired term) | Robert F. Goldsworthy (R) | Otto Amen (R) | District 9-A: Whitman County; District 9-B: Adams and Lincoln counties (Note: Combined, house districts 9-A and 9-B composed the 9th state senate district.) |
| 41st (1969-1970) | Elmer C. Huntley (R) | Robert F. Goldsworthy (R) | Otto Amen (R) | District 9-A: Whitman County; District 9-B: Adams and Lincoln counties |
| 42nd (1971-1972) | Elmer C. Huntley (R) | Robert F. Goldsworthy (R) | Otto Amen (R) | District 9-A: Whitman County; District 9-B: Adams and Lincoln counties |
| 43rd (1973-1974) | Hubert F. Donohue (D) | House Position 1 | House Position 2 | 1972 Redistricting |
| 43rd (1973-1974) | Hubert F. Donohue (D) | Otto Amen (R) | E. G. Patterson (R) | Adams, Asotin, Garfield, Columbia (part), Grant (part), Whitman (part) |
| 44th (1975-1976) | Hubert F. Donohue (D) | Otto Amen (R) | E. G. Patterson (R) | Adams, Asotin, Garfield, Columbia (part), Grant (part), Whitman (part) |
| 45th (1977-1978) | Hubert F. Donohue (D) | Otto Amen (R) | E. G. Patterson (R) | Adams, Asotin, Garfield, Columbia (part), Grant (part), Whitman (part) |
| 46th (1979-1980) | Hubert F. Donohue (D) | Otto Amen (R) | E. G. Patterson (R) | Adams, Asotin, Garfield, Columbia (part), Grant (part), Whitman (part) |
| 47th (1981-1982) | E. G. Patterson (R) | Otto Amen (R) | Eugene A. Prince (R) | Adams, Asotin, Garfield, Columbia (part), Grant (part), Whitman (part) |
| 48th (1983-1984) | E. G. Patterson (R) | Darwin R. Nealey (R) | Eugene A. Prince (R) | Asotin, Columbia, Garfield, Whitman, Adams (part), Franklin (part) |
| 49th (1985-1986) | E. G. Patterson (R) | Darwin R. Nealey (R) | Eugene A. Prince (R) | Asotin, Columbia, Garfield, Whitman, Adams (part), Franklin (part) |
| 50th (1987-1988) | E. G. Patterson (R) | Darwin R. Nealey (R) | Eugene A. Prince (R) | Asotin, Columbia, Garfield, Whitman, Adams (part), Franklin (part) |
| 51st (1989-1990) | E. G. Patterson (R) | Darwin R. Nealey (R) | Eugene A. Prince (R) | Asotin, Columbia, Garfield, Whitman, Adams (part), Franklin (part) |
| 52nd (1991-1992) | E. G. Patterson (R) | Darwin R. Nealey (R) | Eugene A. Prince (R) | Asotin, Columbia, Garfield, Whitman, Adams (part), Franklin (part) |
| 53rd (1993-1994) | Eugene A. Prince (R) (Note: Resigned Jan. 10, 1999; Appointed Chair of the Washington Liquor Control Board) | Larry Sheahan (R) (Note: Resigned house seat; Appointed Jan. 28, 1999 to serve unexpired term in the state senate) | Mark Schoesler (R) | Adams, Whitman, Asotin, (part), Spokane (part) |
| 54th (1995-1996) | Eugene A. Prince (R) | Larry Sheahan (R) | Mark Schoesler (R) | Adams, Whitman, Asotin, (part), Spokane (part) |
| 55th (1997-1998) | Eugene A. Prince (R) | Larry Sheahan (R) | Mark Schoesler (R) | Adams, Whitman, Asotin, (part), Spokane (part) |
| 56th (1999-2000) | Eugene A. Prince (R) | Larry Sheahan (R) | Mark Schoesler (R) | Adams, Whitman, Asotin, (part), Spokane (part) |
| 56th (1999-2000) | Larry Sheahan (R) | Don Cox (R) | Mark Schoesler (R) | Adams, Whitman, Asotin, (part), Spokane (part) |
| 57th (2001-2002) | Larry Sheahan (R) | Don Cox (R) | Mark Schoesler (R) | Adams, Whitman, Asotin, (part), Spokane (part) |
| 58th (2003-2004) | Larry Sheahan (R) | Don Cox (R) | Mark Schoesler (R) | Adams, Asotin, Garfield, Whitman, Franklin (part), Spokane (part) |
| 59th (2005-2006) | Mark Schoesler (R) | Don Cox (R) | David Buri (R) (Note: Resigned Nov. 1, 2007; Named EWU Government Relations Director) | Adams, Asotin, Garfield, Whitman, Franklin (part), Spokane (part) |
| 60th (2007-2008) | Mark Schoesler (R) | Steve Hailey (R) (Note: Deceased Dec. 28, 2008) | David Buri (R) | Adams, Asotin, Garfield, Whitman, Franklin (part), Spokane (part) |
| 60th (2007-2008) | Mark Schoesler (R) | Steve Hailey (R) | Joe Schmick (R) (Note: Appointed Nov. 26, 2007 to serve unexpired term) | Adams, Asotin, Garfield, Whitman, Franklin (part), Spokane (part) |
| 61st (2009-2010) | Mark Schoesler (R) | Steve Hailey (R) | Joe Schmick (R) | Adams, Asotin, Garfield, Whitman, Franklin (part), Spokane (part) |
| 61st (2009-2010) | Mark Schoesler (R) | Don Cox (R) (Note: Appointed January 19, 2009) | Joe Schmick (R) | Adams, Asotin, Garfield, Whitman, Franklin (part), Spokane (part) |
| 61st (2009-2010) | Mark Schoesler (R) | Susan Fagan (R) (Note: Elected Nov. 3, 2009 to serve unexpired term) | Joe Schmick (R) | Adams, Asotin, Garfield, Whitman, Franklin (part), Spokane (part) |
| 62nd (2011-2012) | Mark Schoesler (R) | Susan Fagan (R) | Joe Schmick (R) | Adams, Asotin, Garfield, Whitman, Franklin (part), Spokane (part) |
| 63rd (2013-2014) | Mark Schoesler (R) | Susan Fagan (R) | Joe Schmick (R) | Adams, Asotin, Garfield, Whitman, Franklin (part), Spokane (part) |
| 64th (2015-2016) | Mark Schoesler (R) | Susan Fagan (R) | Joe Schmick (R) | Adams, Asotin, Garfield, Whitman, Franklin (part), Spokane (part) |
| 64th (2015-2016) | Mark Schoesler (R) | Mary Dye (R) (Note: Appointed May 8, 2015 to serve unexpired term) | Joe Schmick (R) | Adams, Asotin, Garfield, Whitman, Franklin (part), Spokane (part) |
| 65th (2017-2018) | Mark Schoesler (R) | Mary Dye (R) | Joe Schmick (R) | Adams, Asotin, Garfield, Whitman, Franklin (part), Spokane (part) |
| 66th (2019-2020) | Mark Schoesler (R) | Mary Dye (R) | Joe Schmick (R) | Adams, Asotin, Garfield, Whitman, Franklin (part), Spokane (part) |
| 67th (2021-2022) | Mark Schoesler (R) | Mary Dye (R) | Joe Schmick (R) | Adams, Asotin, Garfield, Whitman, Franklin (part), Spokane (part) |
| 68th (2023-2024) | Mark Schoesler (R) | Mary Dye (R) | Joe Schmick (R) | Asotin, Columbia, Garfield, Lincoln, Whitman, Adams (part), Franklin (part), Spokane (part) (Note: 2024 court ordered redistricting in Soto Palmer v. Hobbs) |
| 69th (2025-2026) | Mark Schoesler (R) | Mary Dye (R) | Joe Schmick (R) | Asotin, Columbia, Garfield, Lincoln, Whitman, Adams (part), Spokane (part) |

== Key ==
Democratic (D)
Populist (Pop)
Republican (R)

- P.P. is People's Party which was closely associate with the Populist Party.

== See also ==
- Washington Redistricting Commission
- Washington State Legislature
- Washington State Senate
- Washington House of Representatives
- Washington (state) legislative districts
