= Regional Theatre of the Palouse =

- Formation: 2007
- Type: Theatre group
- Location: Pullman, Washington
- Artistic director: John Rich

Regional Theatre of the Palouse (RTOP) is an established non-profit theater company based in Pullman, Washington. It was founded in 2007 by award-winning Managing Artistic Director John Rich. Its mission statement explains its goal: "make a positive difference in the Palouse region by providing an outlet for creative expression through theater arts". RTOP provides theatrical entertainment in the form of play, musicals, and theater workshops. Productions occur primarily in the RTOP Theatre. Past performances have been held at Beasley Performing Arts Coliseum and venues across the Palouse.

== History ==
Regional Theatre of the Palouse divides the presentations with seasons most of them were sold out, during the year 2015 the first show of the year was Little Shop of Horrors, that show like the others was sold out between February 19 to March 1 the time that the show was on available to see, during the year 2015, the theatre had productions like Mary Poppins, The Wizard of Oz, Venus in Fur, Sweeny Todd and finish with Holiday Memories during all December. In 2016, the theater started with the production of the I Do! I Do! on February and finish with Addams Family, but at the beginning of that year the theater could establish and develop a Summer Teen Workshop, but also a short time later the Theater open workshops for Teen and Senior and opened free admissions for seniors of the community for that reason the productions staff had an increase in the number of teens and senior. The rest of the productions as usually were sold out and gave standing ovations. The year 2017 was really important with a lot of changes in the theater, new productions starting with A Funny Things Happened on the Way to the Forum and finishing the year with the musical A Christmas Story, but also the theater created new programs and more sold out productions also the costume and marketing internship program was added to the theater, the summer teen workshop stated to be guided by senior professionals, and for the half of the year the half of the performances included senior patrons. 2018 was a year of growth, change, new programs and productions. RTOP ended the 2018 season with a traditional music theater standard Fiddler on the Roof. The season started in June with summer camp workshops and educational programs that continue to grow. RTOP increased management talent through the ongoing internship program, currently offering internships in costume, marketing, and event planning. Continued with The 39 Steps as the After Dark series followed by Disney's Newsies in November. Auditions were held in November for two shows of the season, Cabaret and Mamma Mia! It continues to grow in hopes of keeping the performing arts alive and thriving on the Palouse. 2019 opened up with Cabaret followed up by the movie musical Mamma Mia! This was a year of growth, and stellar productions! Regional Theatre of the Palouse ended the 2019 season with the dance party musical Mamma Mia! For the theater, 2020 began with high hopes. The theater opened the season with the award-winning Broadway musical, She Loves Me, which boasted a successful pairing of professional and regional talent. The theater were looking forward to their season finale, Thoroughly Modern Millie, which included another star-studded cast, when it was stopped in its tracks by COVID-19. RTOP had to pivot, in order for the theatre to forge ahead.

== RTOP Productions ==
Beasley Performing Arts Coliseum

- The Wizard of Oz by L. Frank Baum; Director: John Rich, musical director: Tina McClure (August 2007)
- Fiddler on the Roof by Jerry Bock; Director: John Rich, musical director: Tina McClure (September 2008)
- Annie get your Gun by Irving Berlin; Director: John Rich, musical director: Tina McClure (September 2009)

RTOP Theatre

- Seussical the Musical by Lynn Ahrens, Stephen Flaherty; Director: John Rich, musical director: Tina McClure (April, 2008)
- I remember Mama by Thomas Meehan; Director: John Rich, musical director: Tina McClure (December 2008)
- Cabaret by Joe Masteroff; Director: John Rich, musical director: Kelly Barnum (March 2009)
- The Trouble with Angels by Jane Trahey; Director: Joseph Monohon (May 2009)
- Willy Wonka by Roald Dahl; Director: John Rich (November 2009)
- Enchanted April by Peter Barnes; Director: AnnaSophia Villeanueva
- Guys and Dolls by Jo Swerling and Abe Burrows; Director: John Rich, musical director: Tina McClure
- Gypsy: A Musical Fable by Jule Styne and Stephen Sondheim; Director: Joseph Monohon, musical director: Tina McClure
- White Christmas by Irving Berlin; Director: John Rich, musical director: Tina McClure
- The Diary of Anne Frank by Frances Goodrich and Albert Hackett; Director: John Rich

2011-12 Season

- Annie by James Whitcomb Riley Music Charles Strouse Lyrics Martin Charnin
- Meet Me in St. Louis by Vincente Minnelli
- The Odd Couple by Neil Simon
- The Secret Garden by Frances Hodgson Burnett

2012-13 Season

- Oliver! (The Musical) by Lionel Bart Music and Lyrics Lionel Bart
- How to Succeed in Business Without Really Trying by Frank Loesser Music and Lyrics Frank Loesser
- Cat on a Hot Tin Roof by Tennessee Williams
- Hello Dolly! by Michael Stewart Music and Lyrics Jerry Herman

2013-14 Season

- The Sound of Music by Howard Lindsay and Russel Crouse Music Richard Rodgers Lyrics Oscar Hammerstein II
- Grease by Jim Jacobs and Warren Casey Music and Lyrics Jim Jacobs and Warren Casey
- Madeline's Christmas by Ludwig Bemelmans
- Barefoot in the Park by Neil Simon
- Les Misérables by Victor Hugo

2014-15 Season

- The Music Man by Meredith Willson and Franklin Lacey Music and Lyrics Meredith Willson
- Oklahoma! by Oscar Hammerstein II Music Richard Rodgers Lyrics Oscar Hammerstein II
- Little Shop of Horrors by Howard Ashman Music Alan Menken Lyrics Howard Ashman
- Mary Poppins by P. L. Travers Music and Lyrics Richard M. Sherman and Robert B. Sherman

2015-16 Season

- The Wizard of Oz by L. Frank Baum
- Venus in Fur by David Ives
- Sweeney Todd
- Holiday Memories
- I Do! I Do! by Tom Jones Music Harvey Schmidt Lyrics Tom Jones
- The Last 5 Years by Jason Robert Brown Music and Lyrics Jason Robert Brown
- Anything Goes by Guy Bolton Music and Lyrics Cole Porter
- Tuesdays With Morrie by Mitch Albom

2016-17 Season

- 13 (musical) Music and Lyrics by Jason Robert Brown
- You're A Good Man Charlie Brown Music and Lyrics by Clark Gesner
- Rabbit Hole written by David Lindsay Abaire
- The Addams Family created by Charles Addams
- A Funny Thing Happened On the Way to the Forum Music and Lyrics by Stephen Sondheim
- Sister Act Directed by Emile Ardolino written by Paul Rudnick musical by Marc Shaiman
- The Birds APR 2017 written by Aristophanes

2017-18 Season

- All Shook Up recorded by Elvis Presley composed by Otis Blackwell
- The Miracle Worker written by William Gibson
- A Christmas Story: The Musical Music and Lyrics by Pasek and Paul
- Legally Blonde directed by Robert Luketic written by Karen McCullah Lutz and Kirsten Smith
- Fiddler on the Roof Music by Jerry Bock Lyrics by Joseph Stein
- God of Carnage by Yasmina Reza

2018-19 Season

- The King and I by Rodgers and Hammerstein Music Richard Rodgers Lyrics Oscar Hammerstein II
- The 39 Steps by John Buchan written by Patrick Barlow
- Newsies Diredted by Kenny Ortega written by Bob Tzudiker and Noni White
- Cabaret
- Mamma Mia! Music and lyrics by Benny Andersson and Bjorn Ulvaeus

Stardust Memories

2019-20 Season

- Funny Girl by Isobel Lennart Music Jule Styne Lyrics Bob Merrill
- Same Time, Next Year by Bernard Slade
- Matilda Music and Lyrics by Tim Minchin
- She Loves Me by Joe Masteroff Music Jerry Bock Lyrics Sheldon Harnick

2020-21 Season

Canceled due to COVID-19

2021-22 Season

- Sunset Boulevard
- Company
- Pippin
- Jerry Herman's Showtune Review

Musical Reviews

- Oktoberfest by Nancy Downen Wexler; Director: John Rich (October 2007)

== RTOP Production Stages ==
=== Beasley Performing Arts Coliseum ===
Previously known as Friel Court, the Beasley Coliseum opened in 1973 in Pullman, Washington. It is a multi-purpose facility on the Washington State University campus. It holds as many as 12,500 people in total, although the seating only allows up to 2,500 during RTOP productions.

=== RTOP Theatre ===
The RTOP Theatre located in the historical downtown district of Pullman, was remodeled in 2007 from a 1920s storefront brick building converting a retail space into a 75-seat venue.

== Working Conditions ==
Several former cast members have anonymously alleged unsafe and unfair working conditions, as well as unprofessional conduct from staff and management.
