= Schweitzer Engineering Laboratories =

Product and service designer and manufacturer

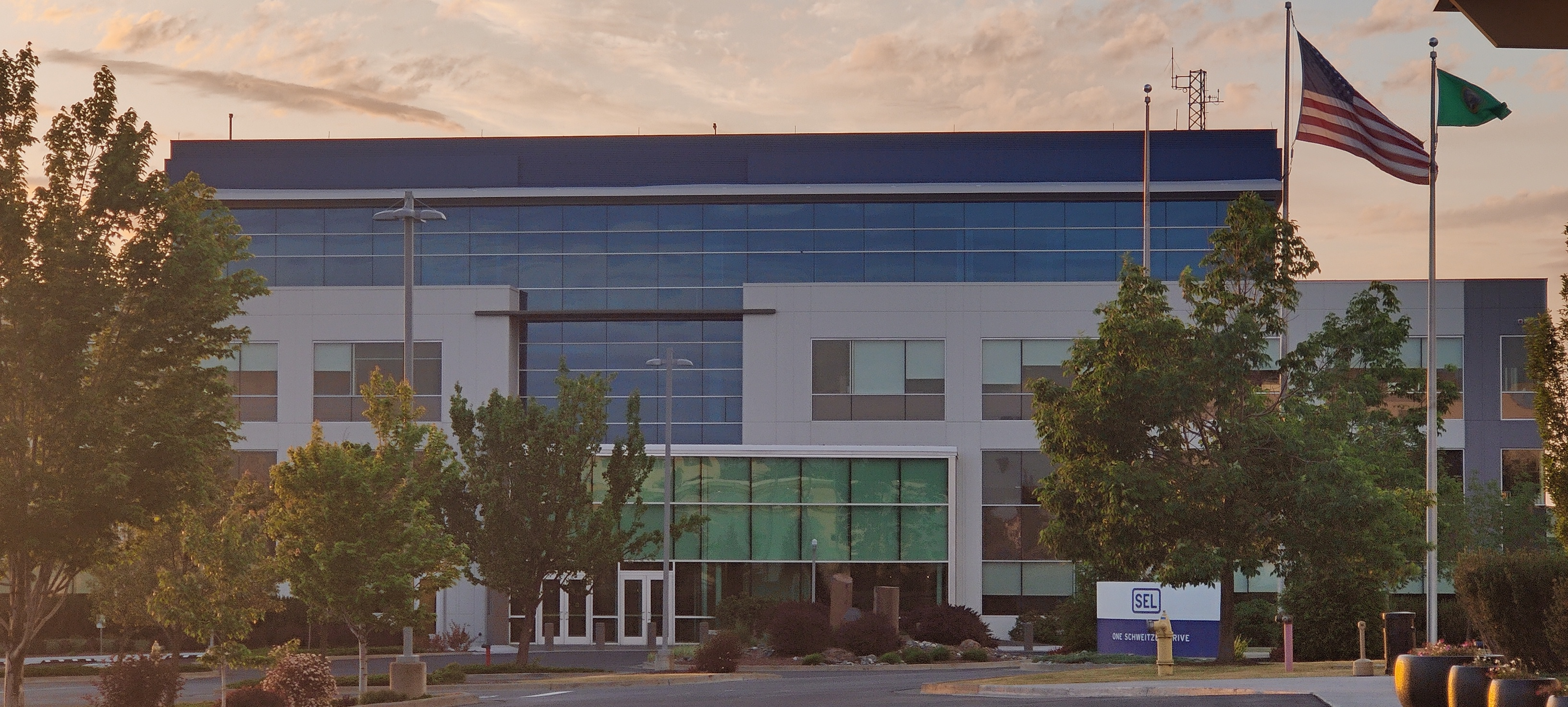
- Headquarters building in Pullman
- Type: Private/employee-owned
- Industry: Electrical equipment
- Founded: 1982
- Founder: Edmund O. Schweitzer III
- Headquarters: Pullman, Washington
- Products: Power system protection & control, fault indicators, electrical enclosures
- Services: Power management Protection and automation services Cybersecurity analysis
- Number of employees: 5,000+
- Website: selinc.com

Schweitzer Engineering Laboratories, Inc. (SEL) designs, manufactures, and supports products and services ranging from generator and transmission protection to distribution automation and control systems. Founded in 1982 by Edmund O. Schweitzer III, SEL shipped the world's first digital protective relay. Presently, the company designs and manufactures embedded system products for protecting, monitoring, control, and metering of electric power systems.

The company serves a variety of industries, including utilities, pulp and paper, transportation, water and wastewater, education, healthcare, government, mission-critical facilities, and oil, gas, and petrochemical operations.

SEL is 100 percent employee owned, headquartered in Pullman, Washington, with about 2,300 based there in addition to 2,700 employees in field offices and other manufacturing facilities in about 60 national locations, in addition to another 50 international.

== History ==
SEL was founded in Pullman, Washington, in 1982 when Dr. Edmund O. Schweitzer III invented and marketed the first all-digital protective relay.

Schweitzer created the relay as a Ph.D. project while at Washington State University. He sold his first product, the SEL-21, to Otter Tail Power Company in Fergus Falls, Minnesota, in 1984. Otter Tail initially used the SEL-21 for its fault location and event recording functions. SEL uses OTTER and TAIL as default passwords for their relays as an homage to their very first customer.

In 1985, SEL built its first building and employed eleven people. In 2009, SEL became 100% employee-owned under an employee stock ownership plan (ESOP).

SEL has five manufacturing facilities in the U.S. located in Pullman, Washington; Moscow Idaho; Lewiston, Idaho; Lake Zurich, Illinois; and West Lafayette, Indiana. In 2003, the company opened its first Regional Integration Center in San Luis Potosí, followed by May 2017 opening in Saudi Arabia city of Dammam with a peak manufacturing ability for 1,200 control panels. With Mexico to build complete panels and PowerMAX for all of North America. The components for the panels are made in Pullman and shipped to Mexico, where they are integrated into panels.

E. O. Schweitzer Manufacturing, a manufacturer of fault indicators and sensors started by Edmund O. Schweitzer, Jr. in 1949, became a division of SEL in 2005.

== Products ==
SEL designs, manufactures and supports products for protection, monitoring, control, automation, and metering of electric power systems, ranging from comprehensive generator and transmission protection to distribution automation and control systems.

== Operations ==
SEL is headquartered in Pullman, Washington. As of December 2016, it had operations in 24 countries and 4,600 employees worldwide. And has sold products and services in roughly 148 countries at that time.

The company operates five manufacturing facilities in the U.S. located in Pullman, Washington, Moscow, Idaho, Lewiston, Idaho, Lake Zurich, Illinois, and West Lafayette, Indiana; with additional Regional Integration Centers located in Charlotte, NC, USA with expansion project in (2017). With International integration centers in San Luis Potosí, Mexico (2003), Campinas, Brazil; Bogota, Colombia; and Khobar, Dammam Saudi Arabia (May 2017).

== Literature ==
In 2010, SEL published its first textbook, Modern Solutions for Protection, Control, and Monitoring of Electric Power Systems. SEL's quarterly Journal of Reliable Power also began in 2010.

The company's other published works include: Line Current Differential Protection: A Collection of Technical Papers Representing Modern Solutions, edited by Héctor J. Altuve Ferrer, Bogdan Kasztenny, and Normann Fischer; Analyzing and Applying Current Transformers, by Stanley Zocholl; and AC Motor Protection, by Stanley Zocholl.

Additionally, hundreds of technical papers, white papers, application notes, and case studies authored by SEL employees are published on the company website.

== Awards ==
2012: Fortune's 100 Best Companies To Work For (SEL ranked #97)

2013: American Red Cross Inland Northwest Chapter 2012-2013 International and National Relief Award

2014: Association of Washington Business 2014 Better Workplace Award

2015: Fortune's 15 Best Workplaces in Manufacturing and Production

2015: United States Energy Association 2015 USEA Corporate Volunteer Award

2016: Fortune's 15 Best Workplaces in Manufacturing and Production

2016: Fortune's 100 Best Workplaces for Millennials

2016: Fortune's 20 Best Workplaces for Baby Boomers

2016: Palouse Knowledge Corridor Entrepreneur of the Palouse Award

For more than a decade, North American electric utilities have ranked SEL as the #1 relay manufacturer in the Newton-Evans Worldwide Study of the Protective Relay Marketplace in Electric Utilities.

== See also ==
- Electric power transmission
- Fault indicator
- Relay
