= Don Cox (politician) =

American politician from Washington (1940–2025)

Member of the Washington House of Representatives from the 9th, Position 1 district
- In office January 19, 2009 – January 3, 2010
- Preceded by: Steve Hailey
- Succeeded by: Susan Fagan

Personal details
- Born: October 3, 1939 Longview, Texas, U.S.
- Died: September 7, 2025 (aged 85) Colfax, Washington, U.S.
- Party: Republican
- Occupation: Educator, politician

Donald Lee Cox (October 3, 1939 – September 7, 2025) was an American educator and politician from Washington. Cox was a Republican member of Washington House of Representatives from District 9.

== Early life and career ==
Cox was born in Longview, Texas on October 3, 1939. From 1963 to 1990, Cox was a teacher, counselor and administrator with Washington Public Schools. In 1990, Cox became a Superintendent with Colfax School District, until 1998.

Following the death of Rep. Steven Hailey, on January 19, 2009, Cox was appointed a member of Washington House of Representatives for District 9.

== Personal life and death ==
Cox's wife was Sherry Cox. They had two children. Cox and his family lived in Colfax, Washington. He died in Colfax on September 7, 2025, at the age of 85.
