= Fault indicator =

Mechanism that indicates a fault in a system

A fault indicator is a mechanism that conveys an indication of a fault, or absence of it, in a system. For example, the purpose of the engine-check light commonly found on the dashboard of motor vehicles is to indicate whether or not there is a fault with the engine.

== Electric power distribution networks ==
In electric power distribution networks, a fault indicator is a device which provides visual or remote indication of a fault on the electric power system. Also called a faulted circuit indicator (FCI), the device is used in electric power distribution networks as a means of automatically detecting and identifying faults to reduce outage time.

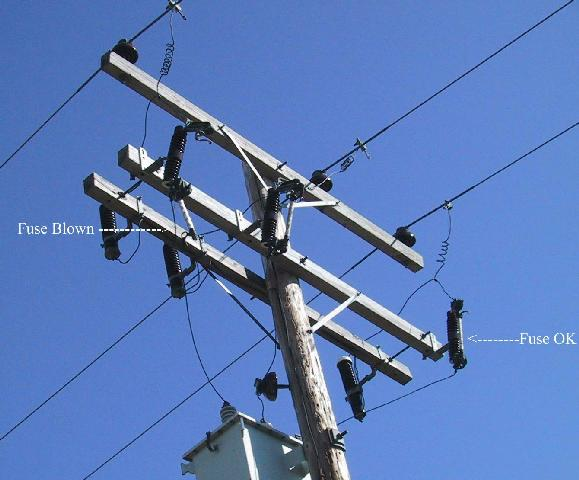
Fuse cutout visual indication

Overhead indicators are used to visualize the occurrence of an electrical fault on an overhead electrical system. Underground indicators locate faults on an underground system. Often these devices are located in an underground vault. Some fault indicators communicate back to a central location using radio or cellular signals.

=== Basic principles ===
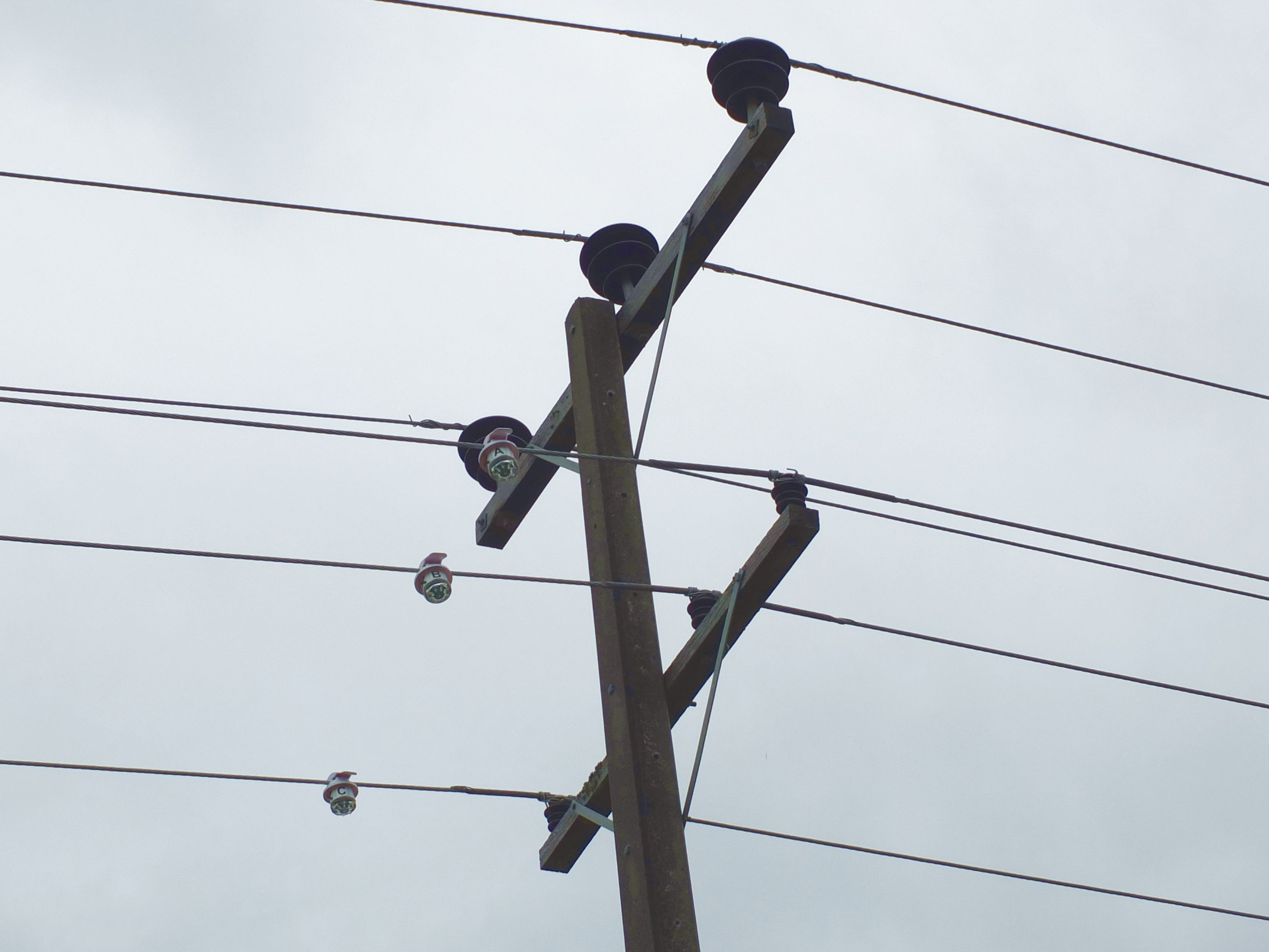
Overhead conductor mounted fault indicator. 11 kV distribution network with compensated neutral at Ataahua, New Zealand

Typically fault indicators sense magnetic field caused by current flows through a conductor or cable. Some of them also use measurement of electric field caused by voltage in conductor.

During an electrical fault on a grounded system, additional current flows through a conductor, inducing a magnetic field, which is detected up by the fault indicator causing a state change on the mechanical target flag, LED, or remote indication device. Ground fault indicators for isolated ground systems sense the vector sum of the current and look for an imbalance indicating a fault on one or more of the three phases.

Systems with earthing through high resistance have low phase-to-ground fault currents so require high sensitivity of fault indication (FI). When there are high load currents and low earth fault levels the line mounted fault indicators should look at the differential increase of the current instead of the absolute value.

In insulated neutral systems and systems with earthing through a Petersen coil, ground faults cannot be located with classical FI's at all. Capacitive current appears in overall faulted system so directional fault location devices are required.

Upon energization of the lines there could be high inrush current which may lead the fault indicators to false operation. Some fault indicators can block inrush current.

Advanced fault indicators should monitor the live line to distinguish fault currents from usual current surges. They operate only after making sure of the feeding circuit breaker/fuse has cut the power flow and the line is de-energized. To monitor the live line, some fault indicators look only at the magnetic field caused by the load current. To be independent from the load current, some FI’s look at the electric field to check the voltage directly. This feature is used to reset the indicator after the line is re-energized too. Such indicators can also distinguish permanent faults from transient faults.

Some modern network protection systems have time to clear a fault as small as possible down to 60 ms so fault indicators must not only be highly sensitive and directional but additionally very fast. Modern fault indicators can detect faults with the duration of one cycle 18–20 ms. In the networks with low earth fault levels the indicators are required to be set to low values. In such cases the user should consider the downstream capacitive discharge current to avoid false operation of the non-directional indicators.

Some overhead line fault indicators called as pole mounted fault indicators can detect the live line and the fault current from 3 to 5 metres (9.8 to 16.4 ft) below the conductors.

High-voltage fuses commonly drop down after operating, making it obvious where the fault is. However, fuses are rarely equipped with remote communication.

=== History ===
The first fault indicators were brought onto the market by Horstmann from Germany in 1946. The E. O. Schweitzer Manufacturing Company (now a division of Schweitzer Engineering Laboratories) introduced a product to the United States in 1948. The first fault indicators were manual reset devices. Later fault indicators automatically reset on system restoration or after a set period of time. More recent fault indicators communicate their status (tripped or reset) via cell signal or radio to a central station, handheld device, or pole-mounted receiver.

Recent developments include a remotely programmable overhead line indicator, fault indication for paper-insulated lead cable, and an overhead fault indicator for mesh networks.

== See also ==
- Power transmission
- Polyphase system
- Electricity distribution
- Overhead powerline
- Power outage
- Three-phase electric power
