= Mary Dye =

American politician from Washington

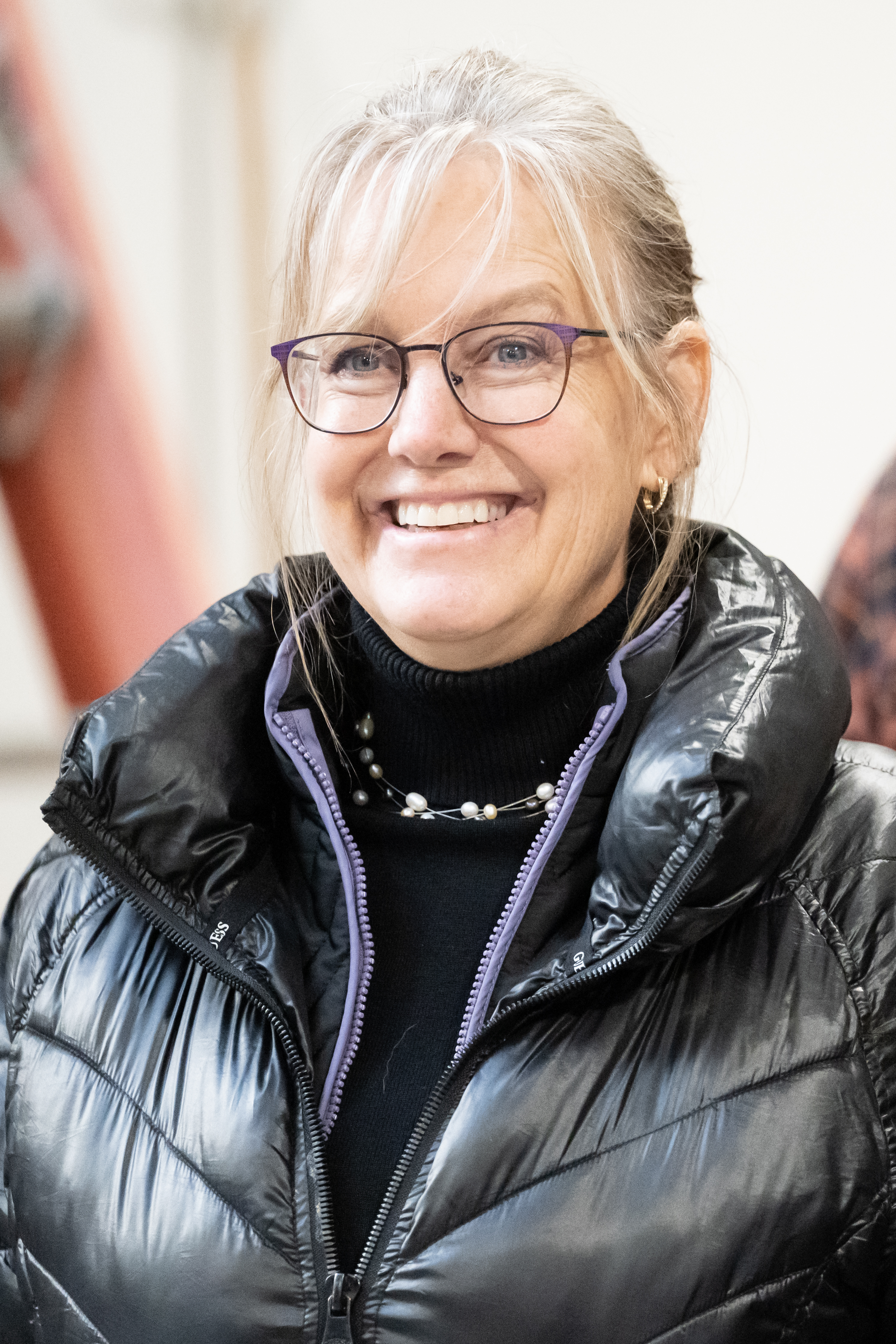
- Dye in 2022

Member of the Washington House of Representatives from the 9th district
- Incumbent
- Assumed office May 8, 2015 Serving with Joe Schmick
- Preceded by: Susan Fagan

Personal details
- Born: Mary Lurintha Maycock; June 15, 1961 (age 65) Idaho, U.S.
- Party: Republican
- Spouse: Roger C. Dye
- Children: 3
- Education: University of Idaho
- Website: Official

Mary Lurintha "Mary Lou" Dye (née Maycock, born June 15, 1961) is an American politician from Washington. She is a Republican member of the Washington House of Representatives from District 9.

== Education ==
In 1983, Dye earned a Bachelor of Science degree in Plant Science/Crop Management from University of Idaho. In 2018, Dye graduated from the Pacific NorthWest Economic Region (PNWER) Foundation's Legislative Energy Horizon Institute.

== Career ==
In 1984, Dye became an agriculture educator for the U.S. Peace Corps in Thailand, until 1986.

Dye and her husband operate a wheat farm near Pomeroy, Washington.

On May 8, 2015, Dye was appointed to the Washington House of Representatives for District 9, despite being the second choice of the Republican Precinct Committee Officers. Dye filled the vacancy left after State Representative Susan Fagan resigned on April 30, 2015. Fagan resigned after facing allegations of fraud and theft for inflating mileage reports to increase taxpayer-funded expense reimbursements.

On November 3, 2015, Dye won the election and became a Republican member of Washington House of Representatives for District 9, Position 1. Dye defeated Richard Lathim with 63.31% of the votes. On November 8, 2016, Dye defeated Jenn Goulet for re-election with 66.51% of the votes. On November 6, 2018, Dye defeated Jenn Goulet for re-election again with 64.22% of the votes. On November 3, 2020, Dye defeated Brett Borden for a fourth election win with 75.05% of the votes.

== Awards ==
- 2020 Guardians of Small Business. Presented by NFIB.

== Personal life ==
Dye's husband is Roger Dye. They have three children. Dye and her family live in Pomeroy, Washington.
