= Joe Schmick =

American politician

Member of the Washington House of Representatives from the 9th district
- Incumbent
- Assumed office November 26, 2007 Serving with Mary Dye
- Preceded by: David Buri

Personal details
- Born: Joseph Scott Schmick; April 7, 1958 (age 68) Colfax, Washington, U.S.
- Party: Republican
- Spouse: Kim Marie (Ziegler) Schmick
- Education: Eastern Washington University (BS)
- Occupation: Farmer, small business owner, politician
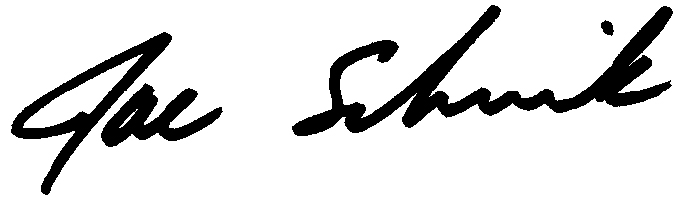
- Signature
- Website: Official

Joseph Scott Schmick (born April 7, 1958) is an American farmer, businessman, and politician from Washington. Schmick is a Republican member of the Washington House of Representatives, representing the 9th Legislative District. Representative Schmick introduced legislation to give away 130 miles of the John Wayne trail back to private landowners effectively closing a large part of the longest Rail-to-Trail in the country. The legislation was nullified as a result of a typo.

== Awards ==
- 2014 Guardians of Small Business award. Presented by NFIB.
- 2020 Guardians of Small Business. Presented by NFIB.
