= Ron C. Mittelhammer =

American economist (born c. 1950)

Ronald Carl Mittelhammer (born c. 1950) is an American economist at Washington State University. He received his Ph.D. from the Washington State University in 1978, with specialisms in econometrics and marketing. In 2008 he commenced consecutive three-year terms as President-Elect, President, and Past-President of the American Agricultural Economics Association.

== Bibliography ==
- Ron C. Mittelhammer (14 March 2013). Mathematical Statistics for Economics and Business (2nd ed.). Springer Science & Business Media. ISBN 978-1-4614-5022-1.
- George G. Judge; Ron C. Mittelhammer (12 December 2011). An Information Theoretic Approach to Econometrics. Cambridge University Press. ISBN 9780521869591.
