= Economic Opportunity Institute =

American public policy think tank

- Established: 1998; 28 years ago
- Budget: Revenue: $1,348,559; Expenses: $916,942 (FYE December 2017)
- Address: 603 Stewart Street Suite 715; Seattle, WA 98101
- Location: Seattle, United States
- Website: www.opportunityinstitute.org

The Economic Opportunity Institute (EOI) is an American public policy think tank based in Seattle, Washington. It is a liberal and non-profit organization. It was founded in 1998.

According to its website, EOI's mission is to build an economy that works for everyone by advancing public policies that promote educational opportunity, good jobs, healthy families and workplaces, and a dignified retirement for all.
