= Edmund O. Schweitzer III =

American electrical engineer and inventor

Edmund O. Schweitzer III (born 1947, Evanston, Illinois) is an electrical engineer, inventor, and founder of Schweitzer Engineering Laboratories (SEL). Schweitzer launched SEL in 1982 in Pullman, Washington. Today, SEL manufacturers a wide variety of products that protect the electric power grid and industrial control systems at its five state-of-the-art U.S. manufacturing facilities in Pullman, Washington; Lewiston, Idaho; Lake Zurich, Illinois; West Lafayette, Indiana, and; Moscow, Idaho. SEL products and technologies are used in virtually every substation in North America and are in operation in 164 countries.

Recognized as a pioneer in digital protection, Schweitzer has been credited with "revolutionizing the performance of electric power systems with computer-based protection and control equipment, and making a major impact in the electric power utility industry."

== Early life and education ==
Schweitzer obtained a B.S. ('68) and M.S. ('71) from Purdue University and a Ph.D. ('77) from Washington State University.

He comes from a family of inventors. His grandfather, Edmund Oscar Schweitzer, earned 87 patents. He invented the first reliable high-voltage fuse in collaboration with Nicholas John Conrad in 1911, the same year the two founded Schweitzer and Conrad, Inc., today known as S&C Electric Company. His father, Edmund O. Schweitzer Jr., earned 208 patents. He invented several different line-powered fault indicating devices and founded E.O. Schweitzer Manufacturing Company in 1949. The company has since become part of Schweitzer Engineering Laboratories.

== Career ==
A prolific writer and inventor, Schweitzer has authored dozens of technical papers in the areas of digital relay design and reliability and holds more than 200 patents worldwide pertaining to electric power system protection, metering, monitoring, and control. In the late 1970s, he served on the electrical engineering faculties for Washington State University and Ohio University. He launched Schweitzer Engineering Laboratories in 1982 from his basement in Pullman, Washington. As of 2023, the employee-owned company has more than 6,000 employees.

== Honors and awards ==
Schweitzer was elected a member of the National Academy of Engineering in 2002 for technical innovation in power system protection and technology transfer leading to the commercialization of products in the electric power industry. He holds the grade of Fellow in the Institute of Electrical and Electronics Engineers (IEEE), a title bestowed on less than one percent of IEEE members, and received the IEEE Medal in Power Engineering in 2012., the highest award given by the IEEE, for his leadership in revolutionizing the performance of electrical power systems with computer-based protection and control equipment.

Schweitzer has been honored by his alma maters with awards including the Outstanding Electrical and Computer Engineer Award (Purdue University), Graduate Alumni Achievement Award, and recognized by WSU Board of Regents as the 45th Distinguished Alumnus. (Washington State University). Additionally, he holds honorary doctorates from the Universidad Autónoma de Nuevo León, in Monterrey, Mexico, and the Universidad Autónoma de San Luis Potosí, in San Luis Potosí, Mexico, for his contributions to the development of electric power systems worldwide.

== Personal ==
Schweitzer and his wife Beatriz are active philanthropists. They support numerous causes related to education and caring for those in need. For example, in 2018, they pledged 3 million dollars to their Alma Mater, Purdue. $1.5 million going to the School of Electrical and Computer Engineering to endow a professorship, and another $1.5 million to support the school's power and energy systems research area.
