= Elmer Halsey =

American politician

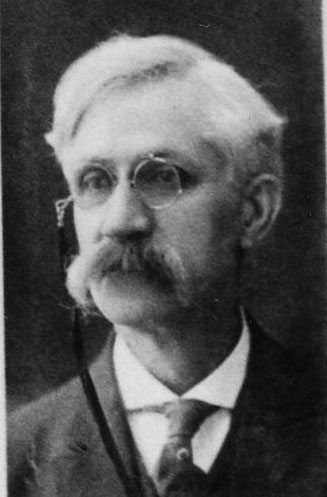
- Halsey in 1917

Member of the Washington House of Representatives for the 9th district
- In office 1909–1919; 1923–1927

Personal details
- Born: January 1861 New Jersey, United States
- Died: March 12, 1943 (aged 82) Clarkston, Washington, United States
- Party: Republican

Elmer E. Halsey (January 1861 – March 12, 1943) was an American politician in the state of Washington. He served in the Washington House of Representatives and Washington State Senate.
