= E. G. Patterson =

American politician

E. G. "Pat" Patterson
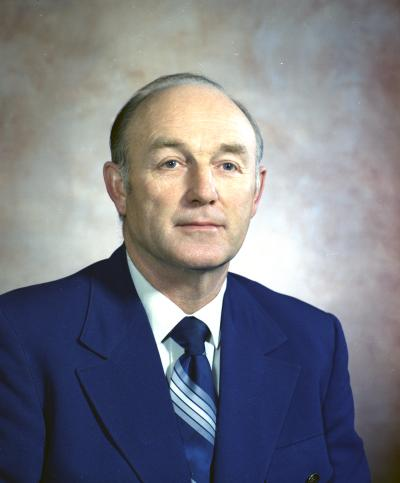
- Patterson in 1973

Member of the Washington House of Representatives for the 9th district
- In office 1973–1981

Member of the Washington State Senate for the 9th district
- In office 1981–1993

Personal details
- Born: October 8, 1919 Pullman, Washington, United States
- Died: February 15, 2004 (aged 84) Pullman, Washington, United States
- Party: Republican

Eugene G. (Pat) Patterson (October 8, 1919 – February 15, 2004) was an American politician in the state of Washington. He served in the Washington House of Representatives from 1973 to 1981 for district 9, and in the Washington State Senate from 1981 to 1993.
