= Susan Fagan =

American politician from Washington

Member of the Washington House of Representatives from the 9th district
- In office November 3, 2009 – May 1, 2015
- Preceded by: Don Cox
- Succeeded by: Mary Dye

Personal details
- Born: December 18, 1947 (age 78) Seattle, Washington, U.S.
- Party: Republican
- Spouse: John Fagan
- Children: 5
- Education: Lewis-Clark State College
- Occupation: Politician

Susan K. Fagan (born December 18, 1947) is an American politician from Washington. Fagan is a former Republican member of the Washington House of Representatives from District 9.

== Early life ==
On December 18, 1947, Fagan was born in Seattle, Washington.

== Education ==
Fagan earned a Bachelor of Science degree in Business Management from Lewis-Clark State College.

== Career ==
Following the death of Rep. Steven Hailey, on November 3, 2009, Fagan won the special election and became a Republican member of Washington House of Representatives for District 9, Position 1. As an incumbent and running unopposed, she won re-elections in 2010, 2012, and 2014.

On May 1, 2015 Fagan resigned following allegations of falsified travel expense forms and pressured her assistants to help with the fraud.

== Awards ==
- 2014 Guardians of Small Business award. Presented by National Federation of Independent Business.

== Personal life ==
Fagan's husband is John Fagan. They have five children. Fagan and her family live in Pullman, Washington.
