= Otto Amen =

American politician

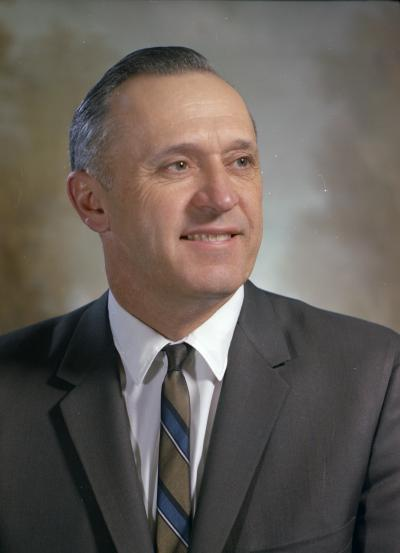
- Amen in 1967

Speaker pro tempore of the Washington House of Representatives
- In office January 8, 1979 – January 10, 1983 Serving with John L. O'Brien (1979–1981)
- Preceded by: John L. O'Brien
- Succeeded by: John L. O'Brien

Member of the Washington House of Representatives for the 9th district
- In office 1967–1983

Personal details
- Born: July 22, 1912 Ritzville, Washington, United States
- Died: April 24, 2011 (aged 98) Spokane, Washington, United States
- Party: Republican

Otto Amen (July 22, 1912 – April 24, 2011) was an American politician in the state of Washington. He served in the Washington House of Representatives from 1967 to 1983 for district 9.
