= Eugene A. Prince =

American politician (1930–2007)

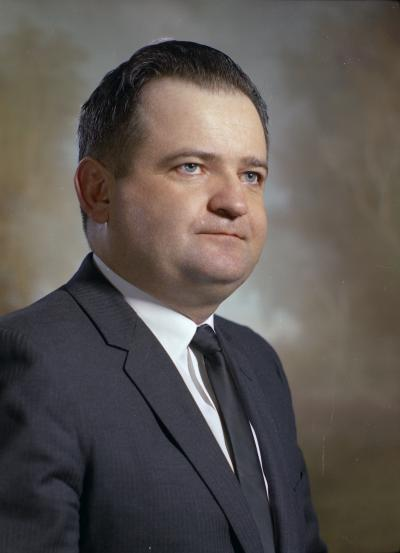
- Prince in 1967

Member of the Washington House of Representatives for the 9th district
- In office 1981–1993

Member of the Washington State Senate for the 9th district
- In office 1993–1999

Personal details
- Born: July 31, 1930 Sunset, Washington, United States
- Died: October 13, 2007 (aged 77) Sunriver, Oregon, United States
- Party: Republican
- Children: Stephen Randall Prince; Suzanne Michelle Prince

Eugene Augustus Prince (July 31, 1930 – October 13, 2007) was an American politician in the state of Washington. He served in the Washington House of Representatives from 1981 to 1993 for district 9, and in the Senate from 1993 to 1999. He was also a wheat farmer and an alumnus of Washington State University.
