= Spokane, Washington =

City in Washington State

Spokane sƛ̓x̌etkʷ
- City
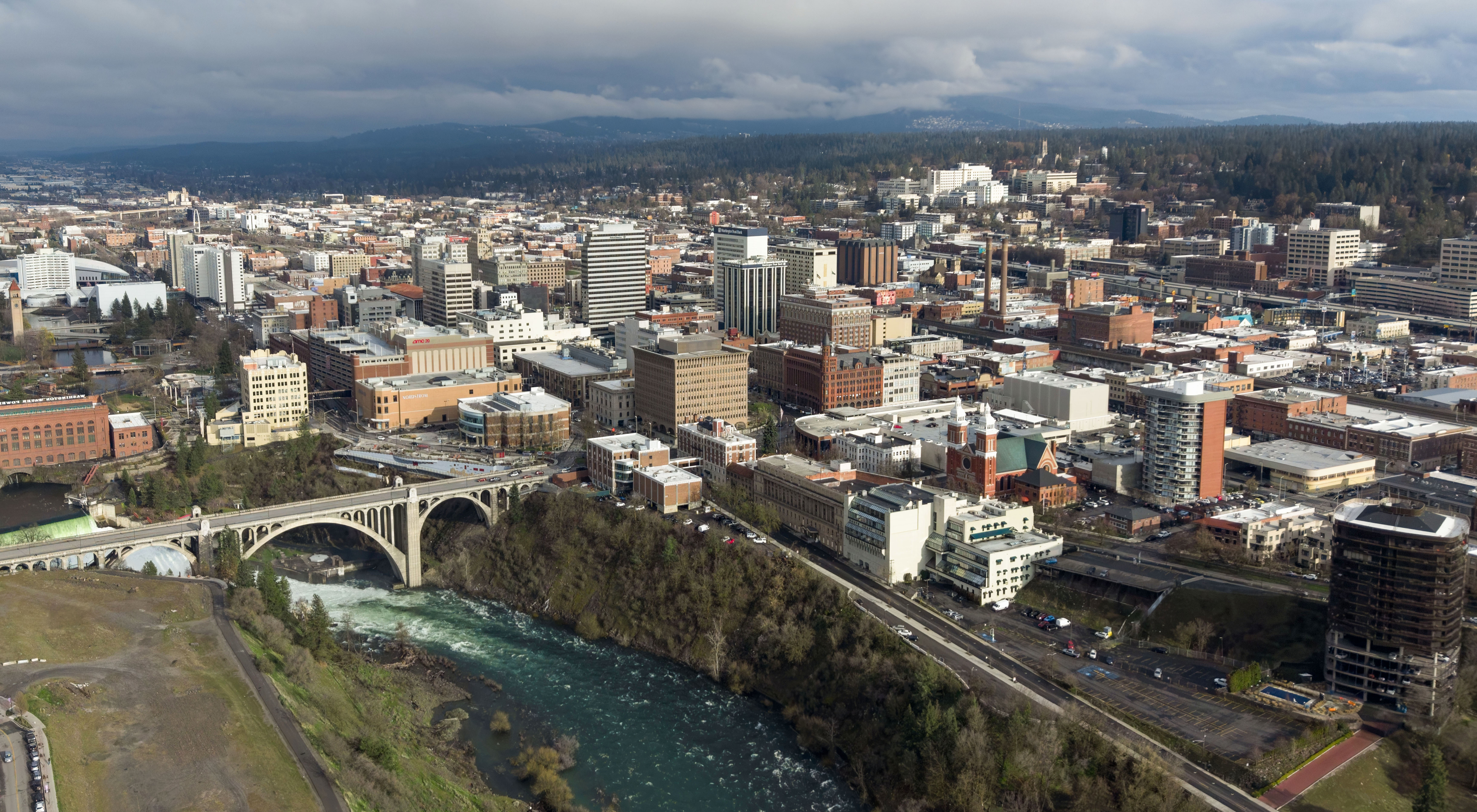
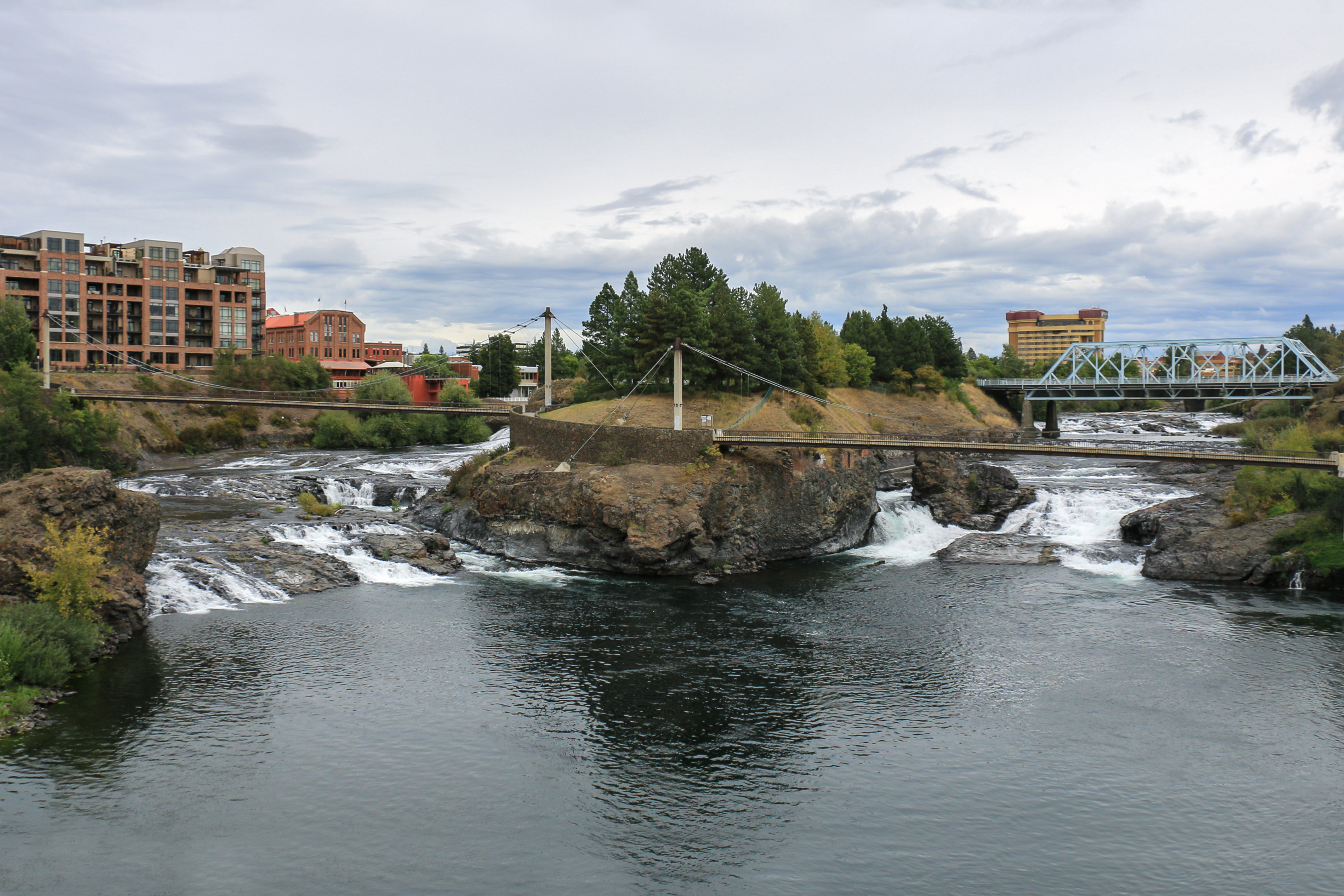
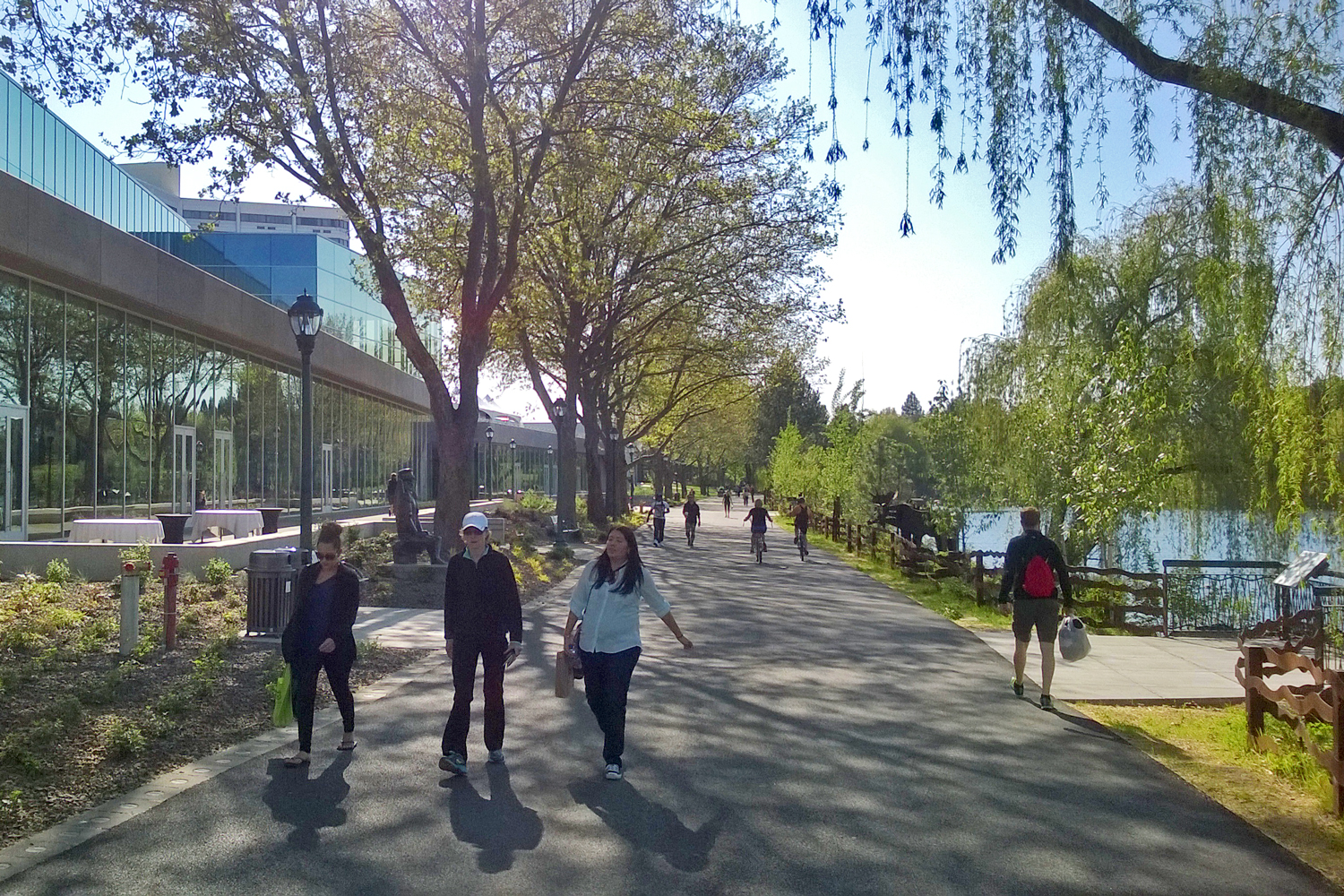
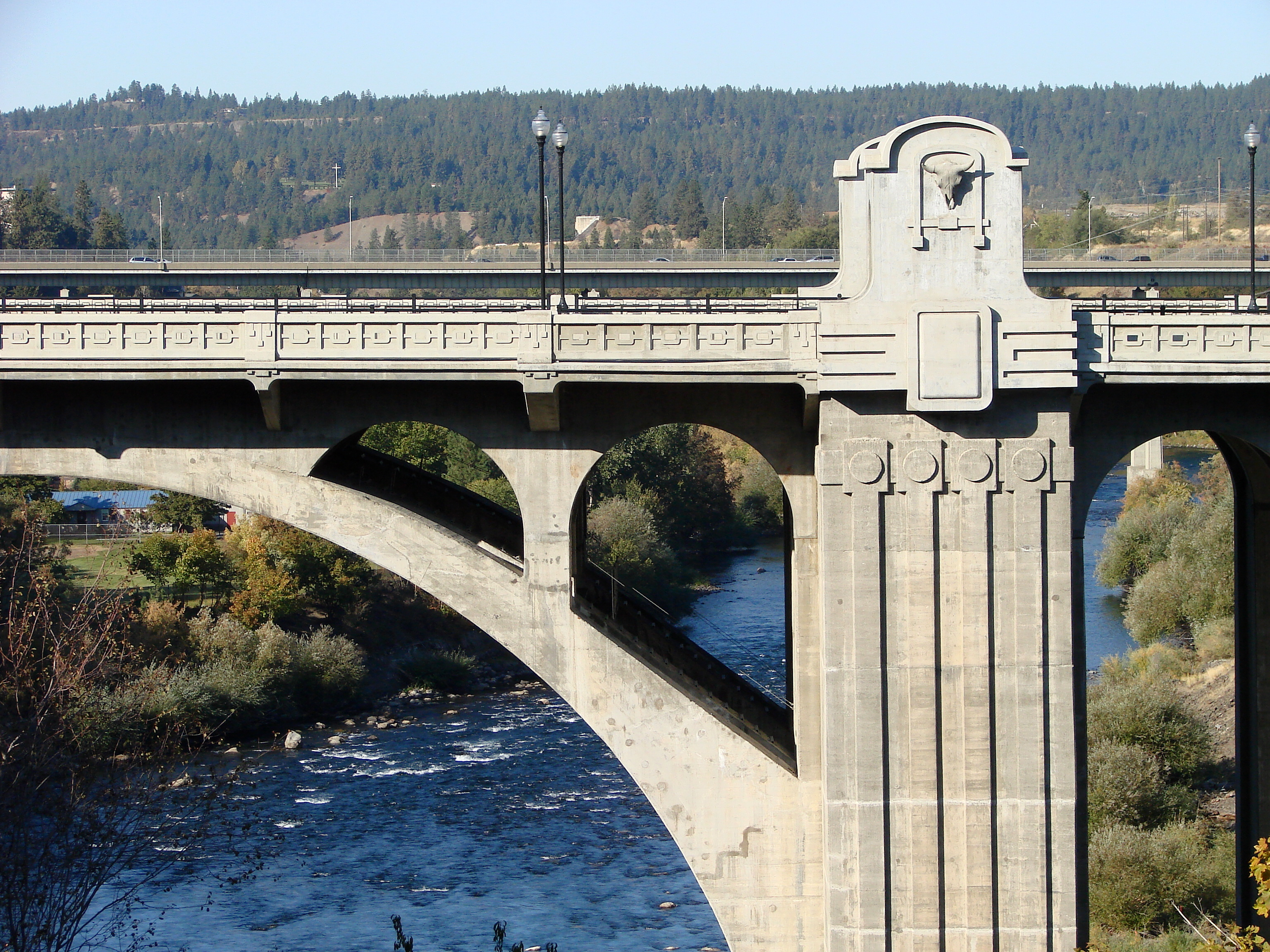
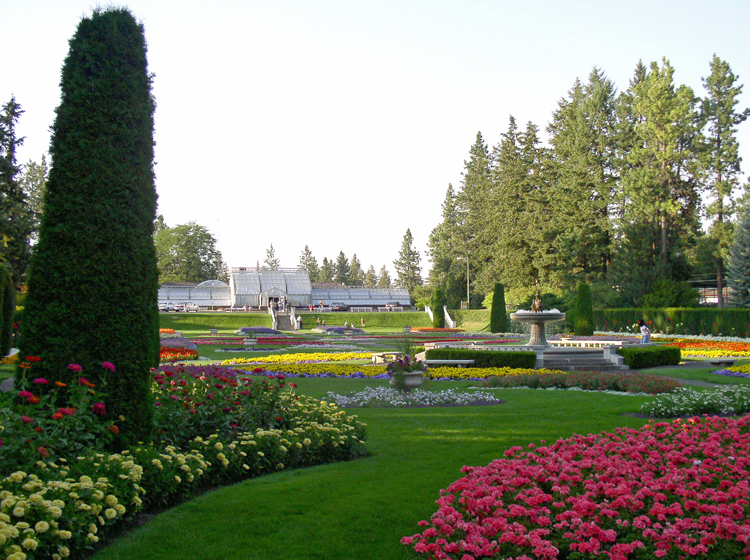
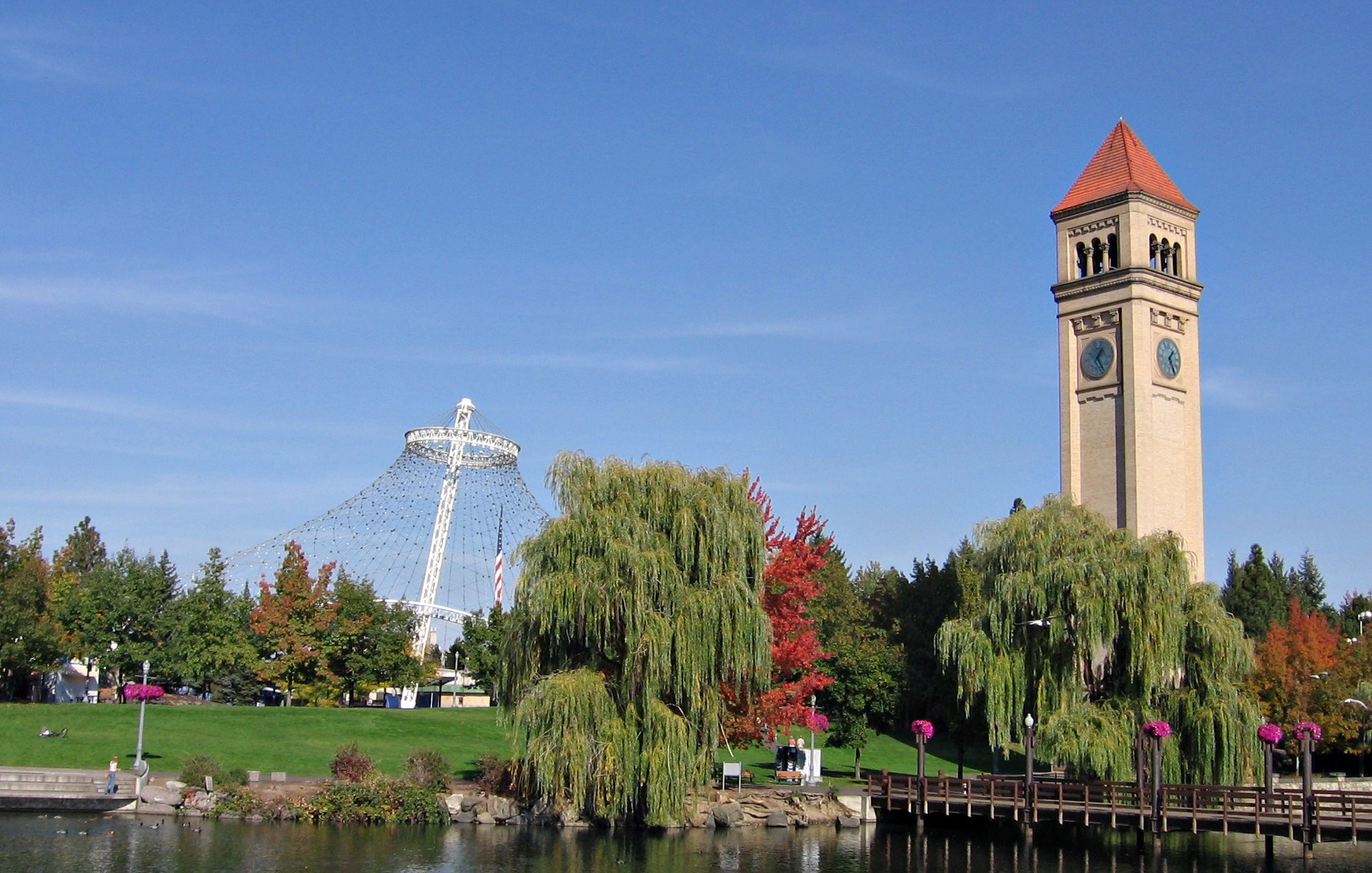
- Aerial view of Downtown Spokane Upper Spokane Falls Spokane River Centennial Trail Monroe Street Bridge Manito Park Riverfront Park

- Flag Logo
- Nickname: The Lilac City
- Motto: Creative by Nature
- Interactive map of Spokane
- Location within Washington (state) Location within the United States
- Coordinates: 47°39′32″N 117°25′30″W
- Country: United States
- State: Washington
- County: Spokane
- Founded: 1873
- Incorporated: November 29, 1881
- Founder: James N. Glover
- Named for: Spokane people

Government
  - Type: Mayor–council
  - Body: Spokane City Council
  - Mayor: Lisa Brown (D)

Area
  - City: 69.49 sq mi (179.99 km^{2})
  - Land: 68.76 sq mi (178.09 km^{2})
  - Water: 0.74 sq mi (1.91 km^{2}) 1.28%
- Elevation: 1,844 ft (562 m)

Population (2020)
  - City: 228,989
  - Estimate (2025): 230,783
  - Rank: US: 101st WA: 2nd
  - Density: 3,330.2/sq mi (1,285.8/km^{2})
  - Urban: 447,279 (US: 90th)
  - Urban density: 2,610/sq mi (1,006/km^{2})
  - Metro: 600,292 (US: 96th)
  - CSA: 785,302 (US: 70th)
- Demonym: Spokanite
- Time zone: UTC-8 (PST)
  - Summer (DST): UTC-7 (PDT)
- ZIP Codes: Zip codes: 99201, 99202, 99203, 99204, 99205, 99206, 99207, 99208, 99209 (PO BOX), 99210 (PO BOX), 99211 (PO BOX), 99212, 99213 (PO BOX), 99214 (PO BOX), 99215 (PO BOX), 99216, 99217, 99218, 99219 (PO BOX), 99220 (PO BOX), 99223, 99224, 99228 (PO BOX), 99251, 99252, 99256, 99258, 99260, 99299
- Area code: 509
- Official tree: Ponderosa Pine
- GNIS feature ID: 2411956
- FIPS code: 53-67000
- Website: my.spokanecity.org

Spokane (/spoʊˈkæn/ spoh-KAN; Spokane: sƛ̓x̌etkʷ) is a city in and the county seat of Spokane County in the U.S. state of Washington. It lies along the Spokane River, adjacent to the Selkirk Mountains and west of the Rocky Mountain foothills, 110 miles (180 km) south of the Canadian border, twenty miles (30 km) west of the Idaho state line, 279 miles (449 km) southwest of Calgary, and 280 miles (450 km) east of Seattle, via I-90.

Spokane is the most populous city in eastern Washington and the second-most populous city in all of Washington (after Seattle), with a population of 228,989 at the 2020 census, while the Spokane metropolitan area has an estimated 605,000 residents.

Spokane is the economic and cultural center of the Inland Northwest. It is known as the birthplace of Father's Day, and locally by the nickname of "Lilac City". Officially, Spokane goes by the nickname of Hooptown USA, due to Spokane's annual hosting of the Spokane Hoopfest, the world's largest 3-on-3 basketball tournament. The city and the wider Inland Northwest area are served by Spokane International Airport, 5 miles (8 km) west of Downtown Spokane, which is located near another airfield at Fairchild Air Force Base.

The first people to live in the area, the Spokane tribe (their name meaning "children of the sun" in Salishan), lived off plentiful game. David Thompson explored the area with the westward expansion and establishment of the North West Company's Spokane House in 1810. This trading post was the first long-term European settlement in Washington. Completion of the Northern Pacific Railway in 1881 brought many settlers from America to the Spokane area. The same year it was officially incorporated as a city under the name of Spokane Falls (it was re-incorporated under its current name ten years later). In the late 19th century, gold and silver were discovered in the Inland Northwest. The local economy depended on mining, timber, and agriculture until the 1980s. Spokane hosted the first environmentally themed World's fair at Expo '74.

Many of the downtown area's older Romanesque Revival-style buildings were designed by architect Kirtland Cutter after the Great Spokane Fire of 1889, which damaged much of the downtown commercial district. The city is also home to the Riverfront and Manito parks, the Smithsonian-affiliated Northwest Museum of Arts and Culture, the Davenport Hotel, and the Fox and Bing Crosby theaters. The Cathedral of Our Lady of Lourdes is the seat of the Roman Catholic Diocese of Spokane, and the Cathedral of St. John the Evangelist serves as that of the Episcopal Diocese of Spokane. The Spokane Washington Temple in the east of the county serves the Church of Jesus Christ of Latter-day Saints. Gonzaga University was established in 1887 by the Jesuits, and the private Presbyterian Whitworth University was founded three years later and moved to north Spokane in 1914.

In sports, the region's professional and semi-professional sports teams include the Spokane Indians in Minor League Baseball, the Spokane Chiefs in the Western Hockey League, the Spokane Velocity in USL League One, and formerly a women's first division team Spokane Zephyr FC in USL Super League. The Gonzaga Bulldogs collegiate basketball team competes at the Division I level. As of 2010, Spokane's major daily newspaper, The Spokesman-Review, had a daily circulation of over 76,000.

== History ==
The first humans to live in the Spokane area were hunter-gatherers that lived off plentiful fish and game; early human remains have been dated to 8,000 to 13,000 years ago. The Spokane tribe, after which the city is named (the name meaning "children of the sun" or "sun people" in the Salish–Spokane–Kalispel language),^{[a]} are believed to be either their direct descendants, or descendants of people from the Great Plains. When asked by early white explorers, the Spokanes said their ancestors came from "up North." Early in the 19th century, the Northwest Fur Company sent two white fur trappers west of the Rocky Mountains to search for fur. These were the first white men met by the Spokanes, who believed they were sacred, and set the trappers up in the Colville River valley for the winter.

=== Trading post ===
The explorer-geographer David Thompson, working as head of the North West Company's Columbia Department, became the first European to explore the Inland Empire (now called the Inland Northwest). Crossing what is now the Canada–US border from British Columbia, Thompson wanted to expand the North West Company further south in search of furs. After establishing the Kullyspell House and Saleesh House trading posts in what are now Idaho and Montana, Thompson then attempted to expand further west. He sent out two trappers, Jacques Raphael Finlay and Finan McDonald, to construct a fur trading post on the Spokane River, which flows west from Lake Coeur d'Alene to the Columbia River, and trade with the local Indians. This post was established in 1810, at the confluence of the Little Spokane and Spokane rivers, becoming the first enduring European settlement of significance in what later became Washington state. Known as the Spokane House, or simply "Spokane", it was in operation from 1810 to 1826. Operations were run by the British North West Company and later the Hudson's Bay Company, and the post was the headquarters of the fur trade between the Rocky and Cascade mountains for 16 years. After the latter business absorbed the North West Company in 1821, the major operations at the Spokane House were eventually shifted north to Fort Colville, reducing the post's significance.

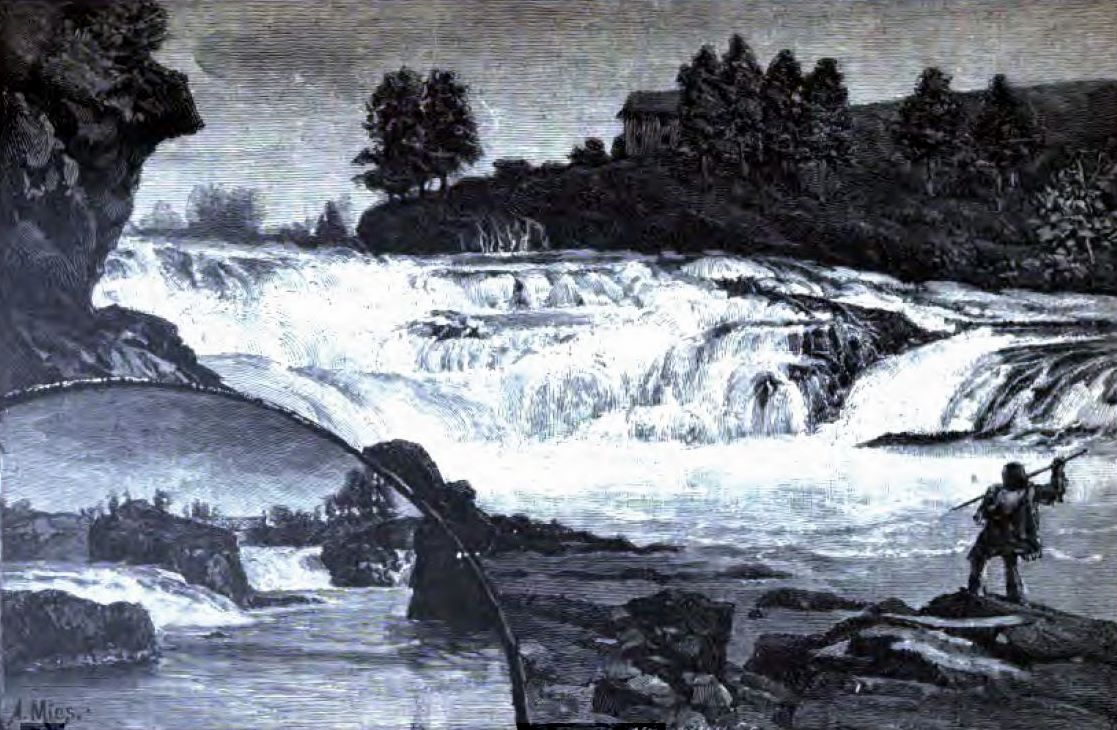
Spokane Falls in 1888

In 1836, Reverend Samuel Parker visited the area and reported that around 800 Native Americans were living in Spokane Falls. A medical mission was established by Marcus and Narcissa Whitman to cater for Cayuse Indians and hikers of the Oregon Trail at Walla Walla in the south. After the Whitmans were killed by Indians in 1847, Reverend Cushing Eells established Whitman College in their memory, also setting up the first church in the Spokane area.

In 1853, two years after the establishment of the Washington Territory, the first governor, Isaac Stevens, made an initial effort to make a treaty with Chief Garry and the Spokanes at Antoine Plantes' Ferry, not far from Millwood. After the last campaign of the Yakima Indian War, the Coeur d'Alene War of 1858 was brought to a close by the actions of Col. George Wright, who won decisive victories against a confederation of tribes in engagements at the battles of Four Lakes and Spokane Plains. The cessation of hostilities opened the inter-mountain valley of the Pacific Northwest to colonial expansion and safe habitation by settlers.

=== American settlement ===
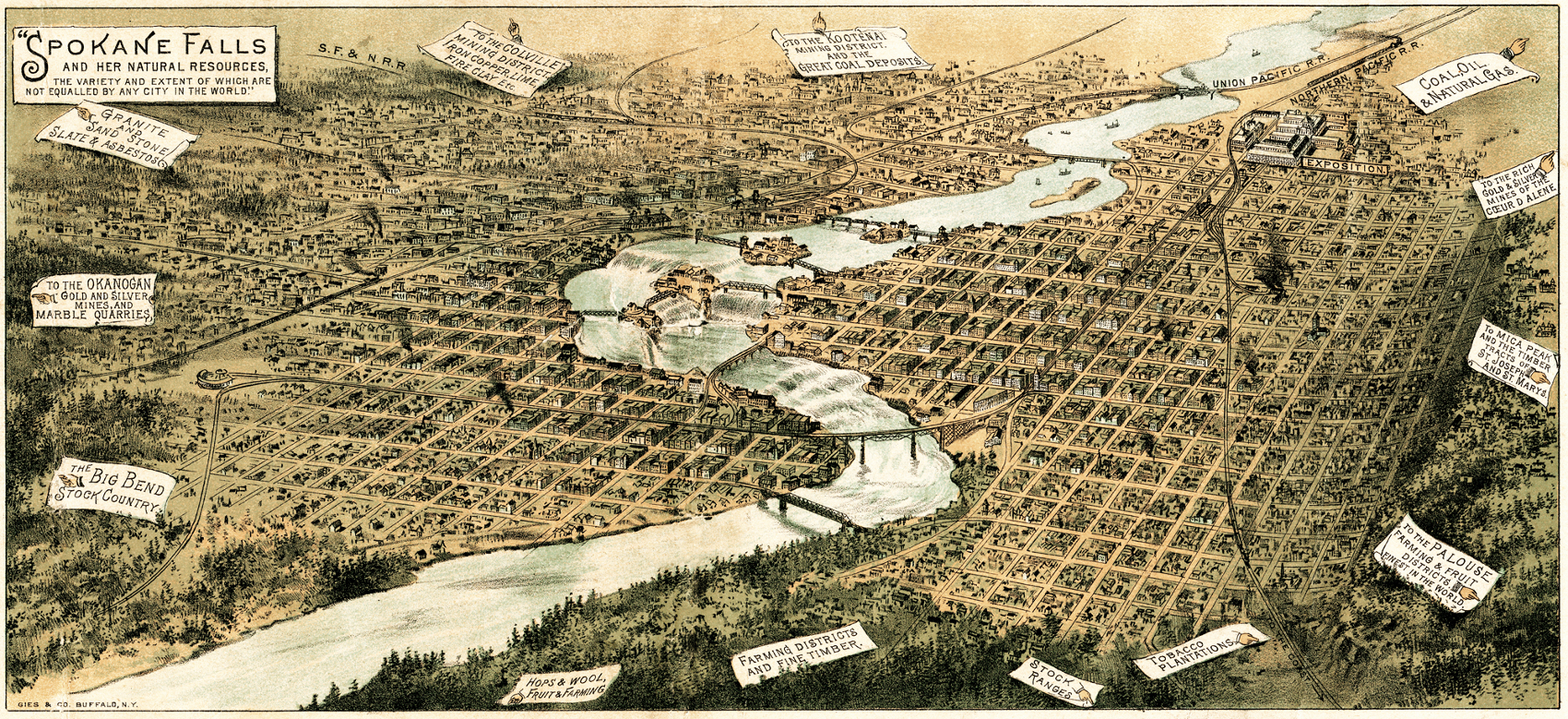
Spokane Falls, 1890

Joint American–British occupation of Oregon Country, in effect since the Treaty of 1818, eventually led to the Oregon boundary dispute after a large influx of American settlers along the Oregon Trail. Great Britain ceded its claims to lands in Puget Sound and the central and lower Columbia Basin by the Oregon Treaty of 1846. The Hudson's Bay Company wound up its operations in the area over the next few years.

In what is now Spokane, the first American settlers were J.J. Downing and S.R. Scranton, cattle ranchers who squatted and established a claim at Spokane Falls in 1871. Together they built a small sawmill on a claim near the south bank of the falls. James N. Glover and Jasper Matheney, Oregonians passing through the region in 1873, recognized the value of the Spokane River and its falls for the purpose of water power. They realized the investment potential and bought the claims of 160 acres (65 ha) and the sawmill from Downing and Scranton for a total of $4,000. Glover and Matheney knew that the Northern Pacific Railroad Company had received a government charter to build a main line across this northern route. Amid many delays in construction and uncertainty over the completion of the railroad and its exact course, Matheney sold his interest in the claim to Glover.^{[b]} Glover confidently held on to his claim and became a successful Spokane business owner and the city's second mayor. He later came to be known as the "Father of Spokane".

In 1880, Fort Spokane was established by U.S. Army troops under Lt. Col. Henry C. Merriam 56 miles (90 km) northwest of Spokane, at the junction of the Columbia and Spokane Rivers, to protect the construction of the Northern Pacific Railway and secure a place for U.S. settlement. By June 30, 1881, the railway reached the city, bringing major European settlement to the area. The city was officially incorporated with a population of about 1,000 residents on November 29, 1881.^{[c]} When Spokane was officially incorporated in 1881, Robert W. Forrest was elected as the first mayor of the city, with a Council of seven, S.G. Havermale, A.M. Cannon, Dr. L.H. Whitehouse, L.W. Rima, F.R. Moore, George A. Davis, and W.C. Gray, all serving without pay. The marketing campaigns of transportation companies with affordable fertile land to sell along their trade routes lured many settlers into the region they dubbed "Spokane Country".

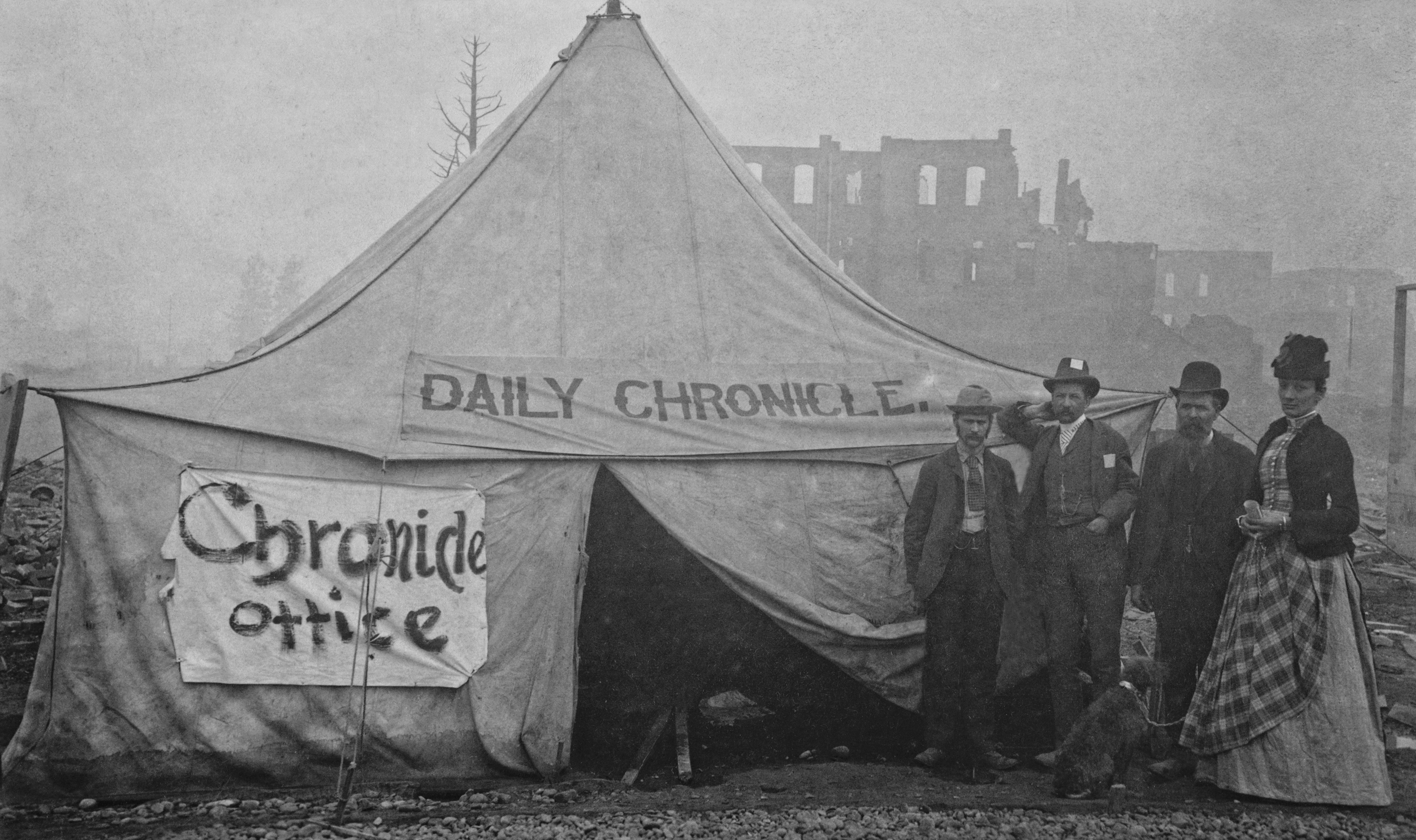
The makeshift Daily Chronicle office after The Great Fire

The 1883 discovery of gold, silver, and lead in the Coeur d'Alene region of northern Idaho lured prospectors. The Inland Empire erupted with numerous mining rushes from 1883 to 1892. Mining and smelting emerged as a major stimulus to Spokane. At the onset of the initial 1883 gold rush in the nearby Coeur d'Alene mining district, Spokane became popular with prospectors, offering low prices on everything "from a horse to a frying pan". It would keep this status for subsequent rushes in the region due to its trade center status and accessibility to railroad infrastructure.^{[d]}

Spokane's growth continued unabated until August 4, 1889, when a fire, now known as The Great Fire (not to be confused with the Great Fire of 1910, which happened nearby), began just after 6:00 p.m., and destroyed the city's downtown commercial district. Due to technical problems with a pump station, there was no water pressure in the city when the fire started. In a desperate bid to starve the fire, firefighters began razing buildings with dynamite. Eventually, the winds and the fire died down; 32 blocks of Spokane's downtown core had been destroyed and one person was killed.

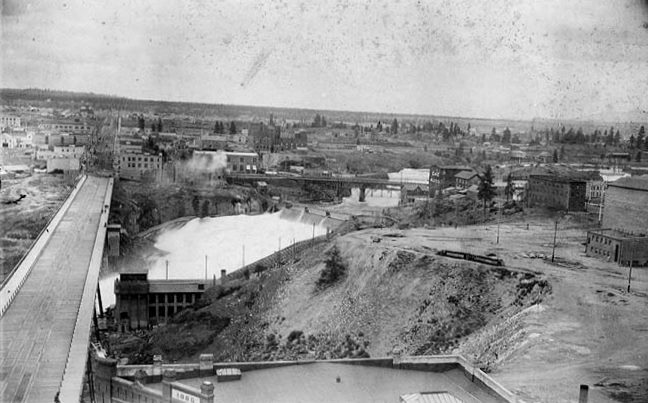
Spokane ca. 1895

Despite this catastrophe, and in part because of it, Spokane experienced a building boom.^{[e]} The downtown was rebuilt, and the city was reincorporated under the present name of "Spokane" in 1891. According to historian David H. Stratton, "From the late 1890s to about 1912, a great flurry of construction created a modern urban profile of office buildings, banks, department stores, hotels and other commercial institutions" which stretched from the Spokane River to the site of the Northern Pacific railroad tracks below the South Hill. Yet the rebuilding and development of the city was far from smooth: between 1889 and 1896 alone, all six bridges over the Spokane River were destroyed by floods before their completion.

In the 1890s, African-Americans from Roslyn migrated to the city; they were looking for work after the closure of the area's mines. Two African-American churches, Calvary Baptist and Bethel African Methodist Episcopal, were founded in 1890. Just three years after the fire, in 1892, James J. Hill's Great Northern Railway arrived in the chosen site for Hill's rail yards, the newly created township of Hillyard (annexed by Spokane in 1924). Spokane became an important rail shipping and transportation hub for the Inland Empire, connecting mines in the Silver Valley with agricultural areas around the Palouse region. The city's population ballooned to 19,922 in 1890, and to 36,848 in 1900 with the arrival of additional railroads.

By 1910 the population had hit 104,000, and Spokane eclipsed Walla Walla as the commercial center of the Inland Empire. In time the city came to be known as the "capital" of the Inland Empire and the heart of a vast tributary region. After the arrival of the Northern Pacific, Union Pacific, Great Northern, and Chicago, Milwaukee, St. Paul and Pacific railroads, Spokane became one of the most important rail centers in the western U.S.

=== Early 20th century ===
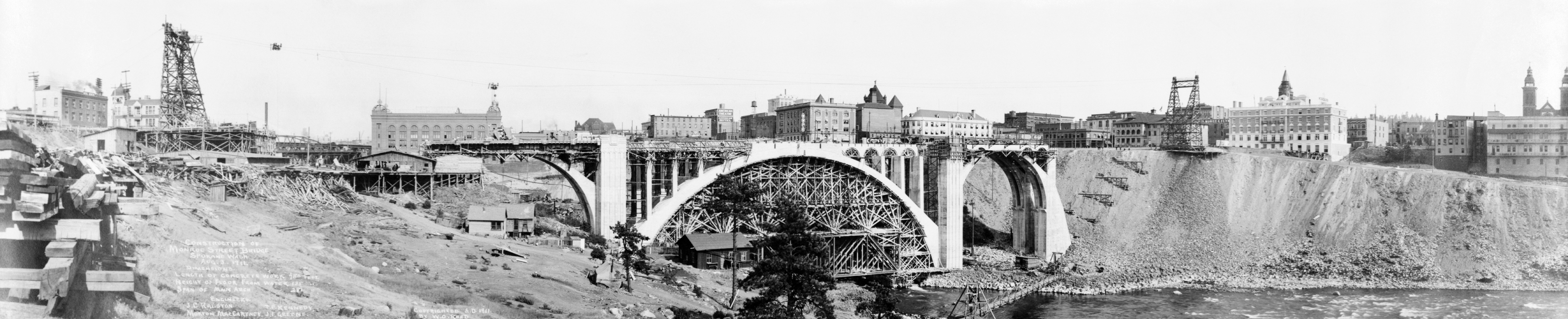
The Monroe Street Bridge, 1911

Expansion abruptly stopped in the 1910s and was followed by a period of population decline, due in large part to Spokane's slowing economy. Control of regional mines and resources became increasingly dominated by national corporations rather than local people and organizations, diverting capital outside of Spokane and decreasing growth and investment opportunities in the city. During this time of stagnation, unrest was prevalent among the area's unemployed, who became victimized by "job sharks", who charged a fee for signing up workers in the logging camps. Job sharks and employment agencies were known to cheat itinerant workers, sometimes paying bribes to periodically fire entire work crews, thus generating repetitive fees for themselves. Crime spiked in the 1890s and 1900s, with eruptions of violent activity involving unions such as the Industrial Workers of the World (IWW), or "Wobblies" as they were often known, whose free speech fights had begun to garner national attention. Now, with grievances concerning the unethical practices of the employment agencies, they initiated a free speech fight in September 1908 by purposely breaking a city ordinance on soapboxing. With IWW encouragement, union members from many western states came to Spokane to take part in what had become a publicity stunt. Many Wobblies were incarcerated, including feminist labor leader Elizabeth Gurley Flynn, who published her account in the local Industrial Worker.

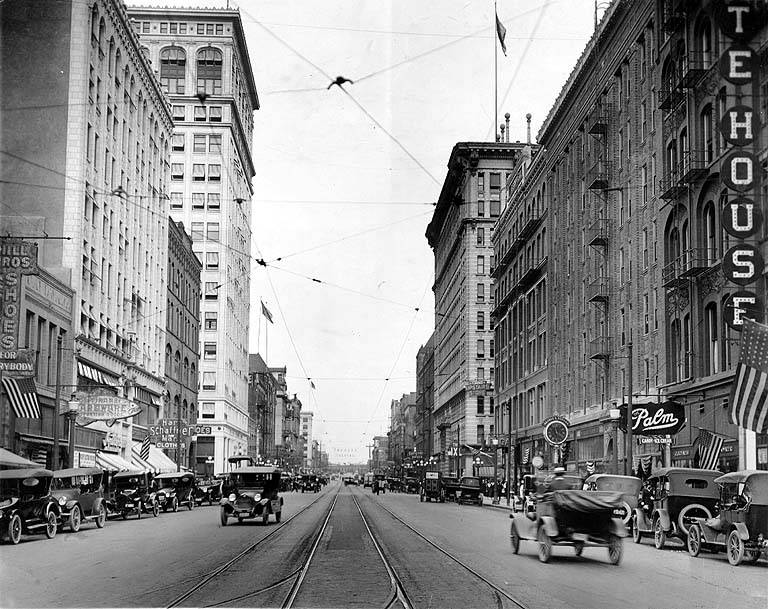
Riverside Avenue c. 1923

After mining declined at the turn of the 20th century, agriculture and logging became the primary influences in the Spokane economy. The population explosion and the building of homes, railroads, and mines in northern Idaho and southern British Columbia fueled the logging industry. Although overshadowed in importance by the vast timbered areas on the coastal regions west of the Cascades, and burdened with monopolistic rail freight rates and stiff competition, Spokane became a noted leader in the manufacture of doors, window sashes, blinds, and other planing mill products. Rail freight rates were much higher in Spokane than the rates in coastal seaport cities such as Seattle and Portland, so much so that Minneapolis merchants could ship goods first to Seattle and then back to Spokane for less than shipping directly to Spokane, even though the rail line ran through Spokane on the way to the coast.^{[f]}

The Inland Northwest region has also long been associated with farming, especially wheat production. Initially, the Palouse was thought to be unsuitable for wheat production due to the hilly terrain, believing wheat could not be cultivated on the tops of the hills, but the region showed great promise for wheat production when it began in the late 1850s in part due to the hilltops. The Palouse was and still is a breadbasket and was able to develop and grow with the completion of several railroad networks as well as a highway system that began to center around the city of Spokane, aiding farmers from around the region in distributing their products to market. Inland Empire farmers exported wheat, livestock and other agricultural products to ports such as New York, Liverpool and Tokyo.

Local morale was affected for years by the collapse of the Division Street Bridge early in the morning on December 15, 1915, which killed five people and injured over 20, but a new bridge was built (eventually replaced in 1994). The 1920 census showed a net increase of just 35 individuals, which actually indicates that thousands left the city when considering the natural growth rate of a population. Growth in the 1920s and 1930s remained slow but less drastically so, forcing city boosters to market the city as a quiet, comfortable place suitable for raising a family rather than a dynamic community full of opportunity. The Inland Empire was heavily dependent on natural resources and extractive goods produced from mines, forests, and farms, which experienced a fall in demand. The situation improved slightly with the start of World War II as aluminum production commenced in Spokane due to the area's cheap electricity (produced from regional dams) and the increased demand for airplanes.

=== Second half of the 20th century ===
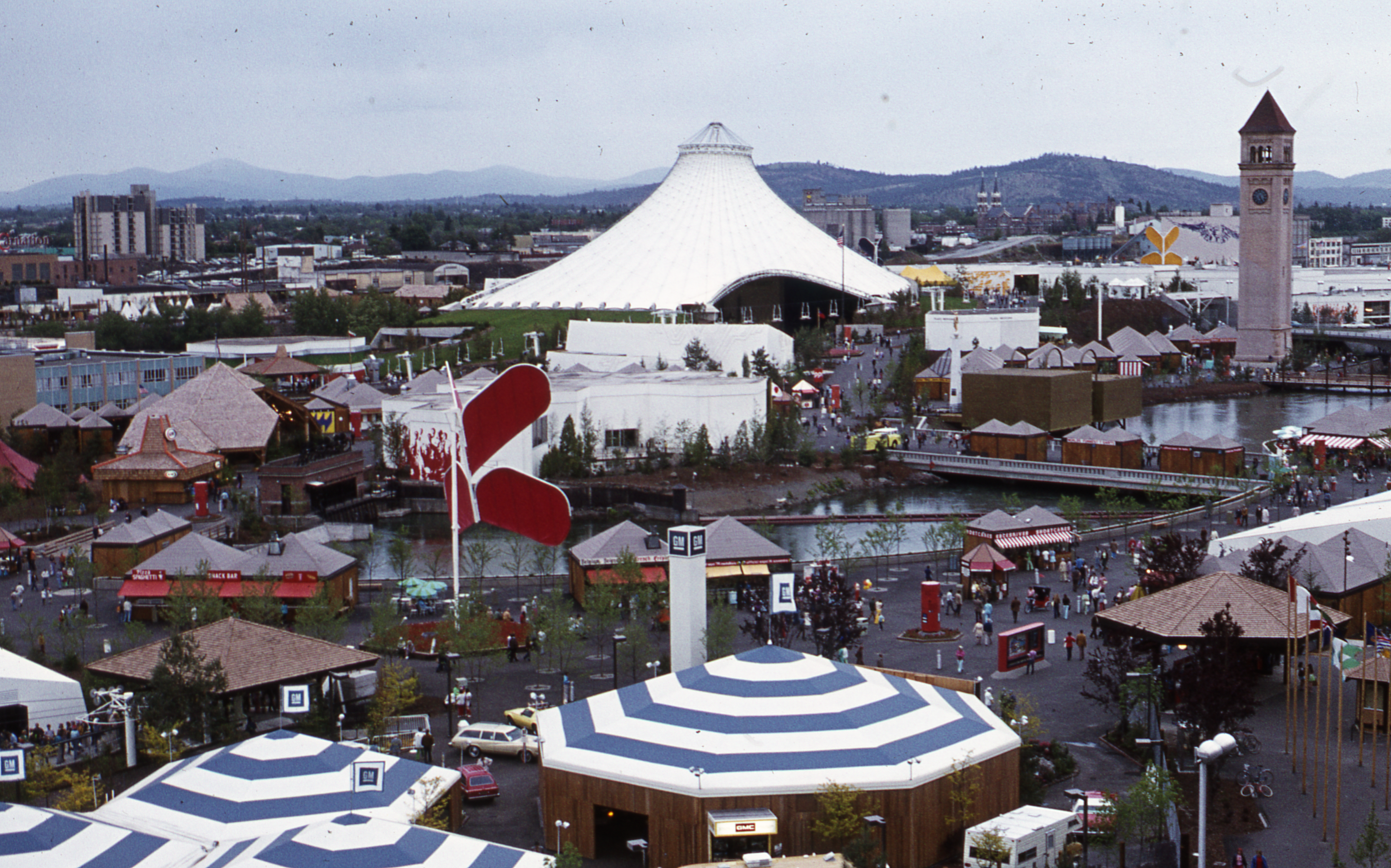
Expo '74 in Riverfront Park

After decades of stagnation and slow growth, Spokane businessmen formed Spokane Unlimited in the early 1960s, an organization that sought to revitalize downtown Spokane. A recreation park showcasing the Spokane Falls was the preferred option, and after successful negotiation to relocate the railroad facilities on Havermale Island, they executed on a proposal to host the first environmentally themed World's Fair in Expo '74 on May 4, becoming the smallest city at the time to host a World's Fair. This event transformed Spokane's downtown, removing a century of railroad infrastructure and re-inventing the urban core. After Expo '74, the fairgrounds became the 100-acre (40 ha) Riverfront Park.

The growth witnessed in the late 1970s and early 1980s was interrupted by another U.S. recession in 1981, in which silver, timber, and farm prices dropped. The period of decline for the city lasted into the 1990s and was also marked by a loss of many steady family-wage jobs in the manufacturing sector. At this time, market forces began to impact the local Kaiser Aluminum plant and layoffs, pension cuts, a 1998–1999 labor strike, and eventually bankruptcy in 2002 followed. Although this was a tough period, Spokane's economy had started to benefit from some measure of economic diversification; growing companies such as Key Tronic and other research, marketing, and assembly plants for technology companies helped lessen Spokane's dependence on natural resources.

=== 21st century ===
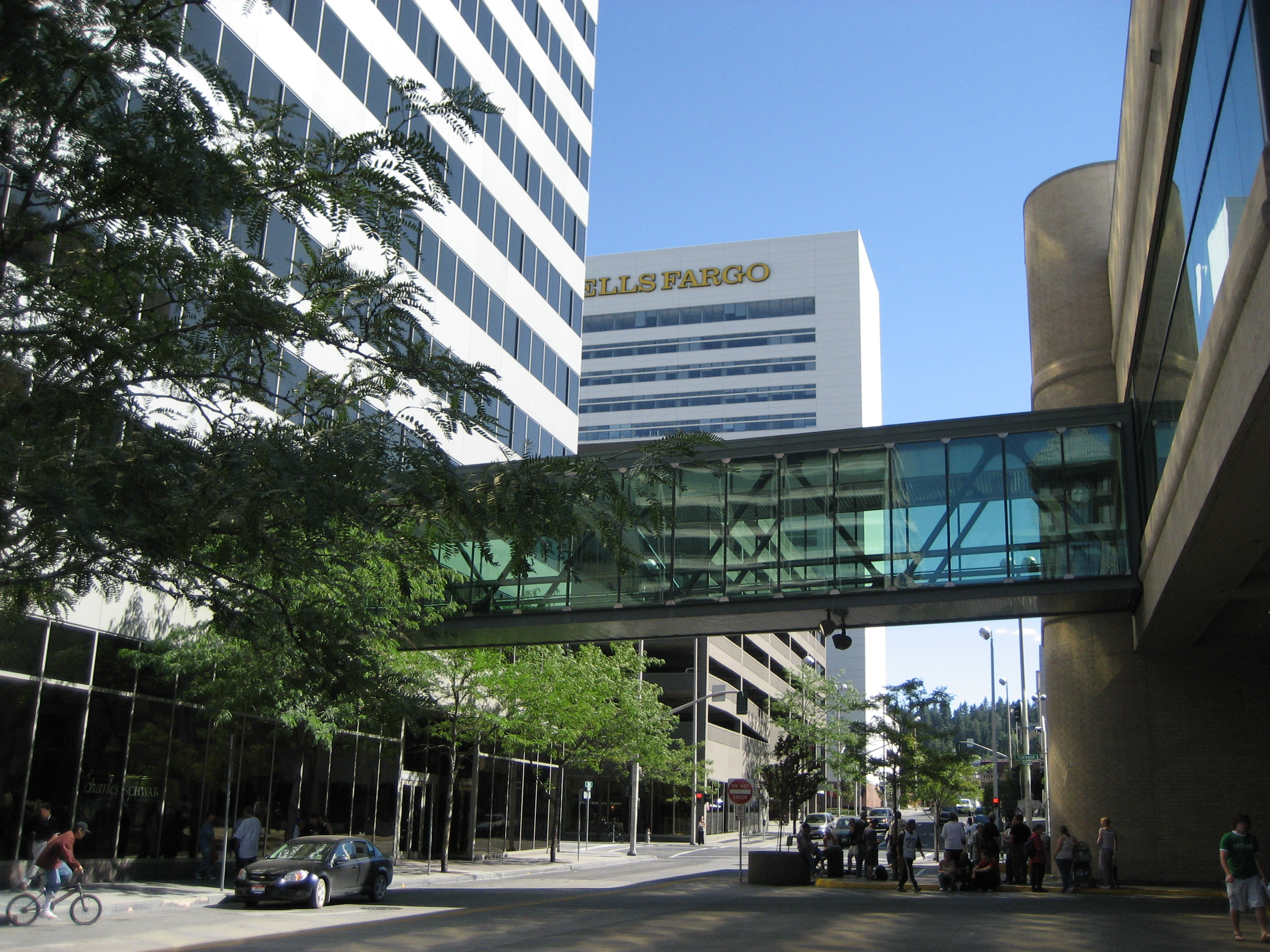
Spokane has an extensive Skywalk network

As of 2014, Spokane is still trying to make the transition to a more service-oriented economy in the face of a less prominent manufacturing sector. Developing the city's strength in the medical and health sciences fields has seen some success, resulting in the expansion of the University District with two medical school branches. The city faces challenges such as a scarcity of high-paying jobs, pockets of poverty, and areas of high crime.

The opening of the River Park Square in 1999 served as a catalyst and sparked a downtown rebirth that included the building of the Spokane Arena and expansion of the Spokane Convention Center. Other major projects include the building of the Big Easy concert house (now the Knitting Factory) and renovation of the historic Montvale Hotel, the Kirtland Cutter-designed Davenport Hotel (after being vacant for over 20 years), the Fox Theater (now home to the Spokane Symphony) as well as the completion of the WSU Pharmaceutical and Biomedical Sciences Building in 2013 and the Davenport Grand Hotel in 2015, Ridpath Hotel in 2018 and the ongoing renovation of Riverfront Park (as of May 2019). The Kendall Yards development on the west side of downtown Spokane is one of the largest construction projects in the city's history. Directly across the Spokane River from downtown, it will blend residential and retail space with plazas and walking trails.

==== 2026 wildfires ====
In early August 2026, the fast-moving, ongoing Old Trails Fire destroyed over 600 buildings, marking the worst disaster in Spokane's history.

== Geography ==
=== Topography ===
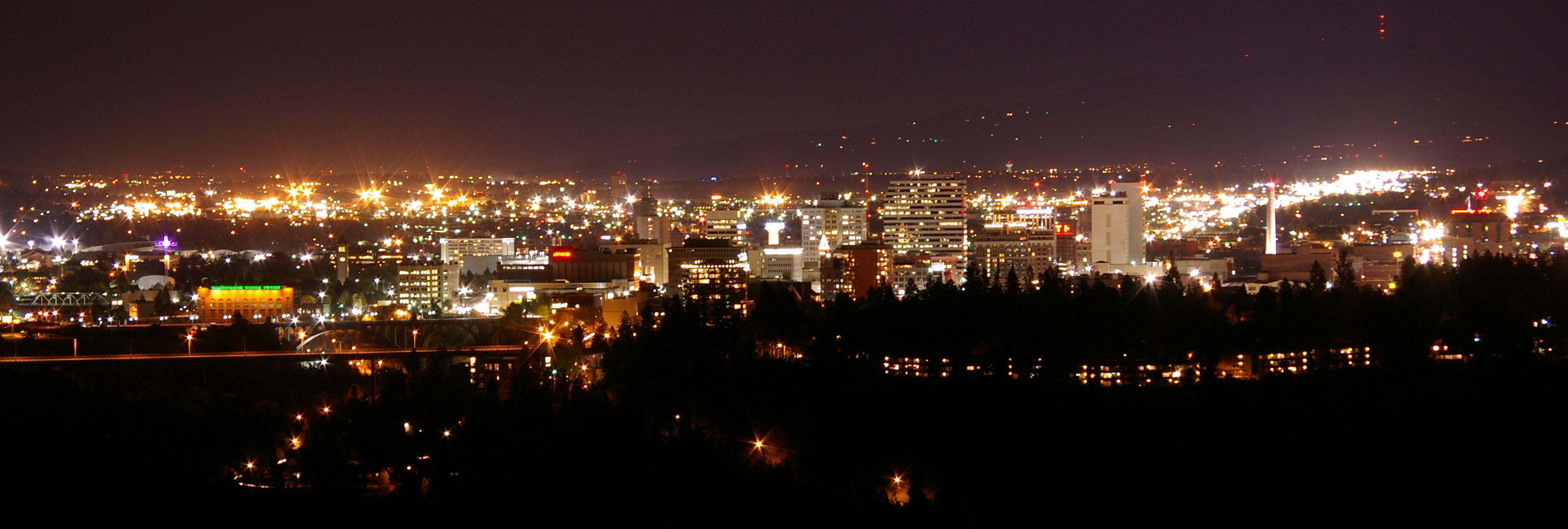
Spokane at night from the west, with Krell Hill silhouetted by radio antennas

Spokane is located on the Spokane River in eastern Washington at an elevation of 1,843 feet (562 m) above sea level, about eighteen miles (29 km) west of the Idaho border, 92 miles (148 km) south of the Canadian border, 229 miles (369 km) due east of Seattle, and 279 miles (449 km) southwest of Calgary, Alberta, Canada. The lowest elevation in the city of Spokane is the northernmost point of the Spokane River within city limits (in Riverside State Park) at 1,608 feet (490 m); the highest elevation is on the northeast side, near the community of Hillyard (though closer to Beacon Hill and the North Hill Reservoir) at 2,591 feet (790 m). Spokane is part of the Inland Northwest region, consisting of eastern Washington, north Idaho, northwestern Montana, and northeastern Oregon. The city has a total area of 60.02 square miles (155.45 km^{2}), of which 59.25 square miles (153.46 km^{2}) is land and 0.77 square miles (1.99 km^{2}) is water.

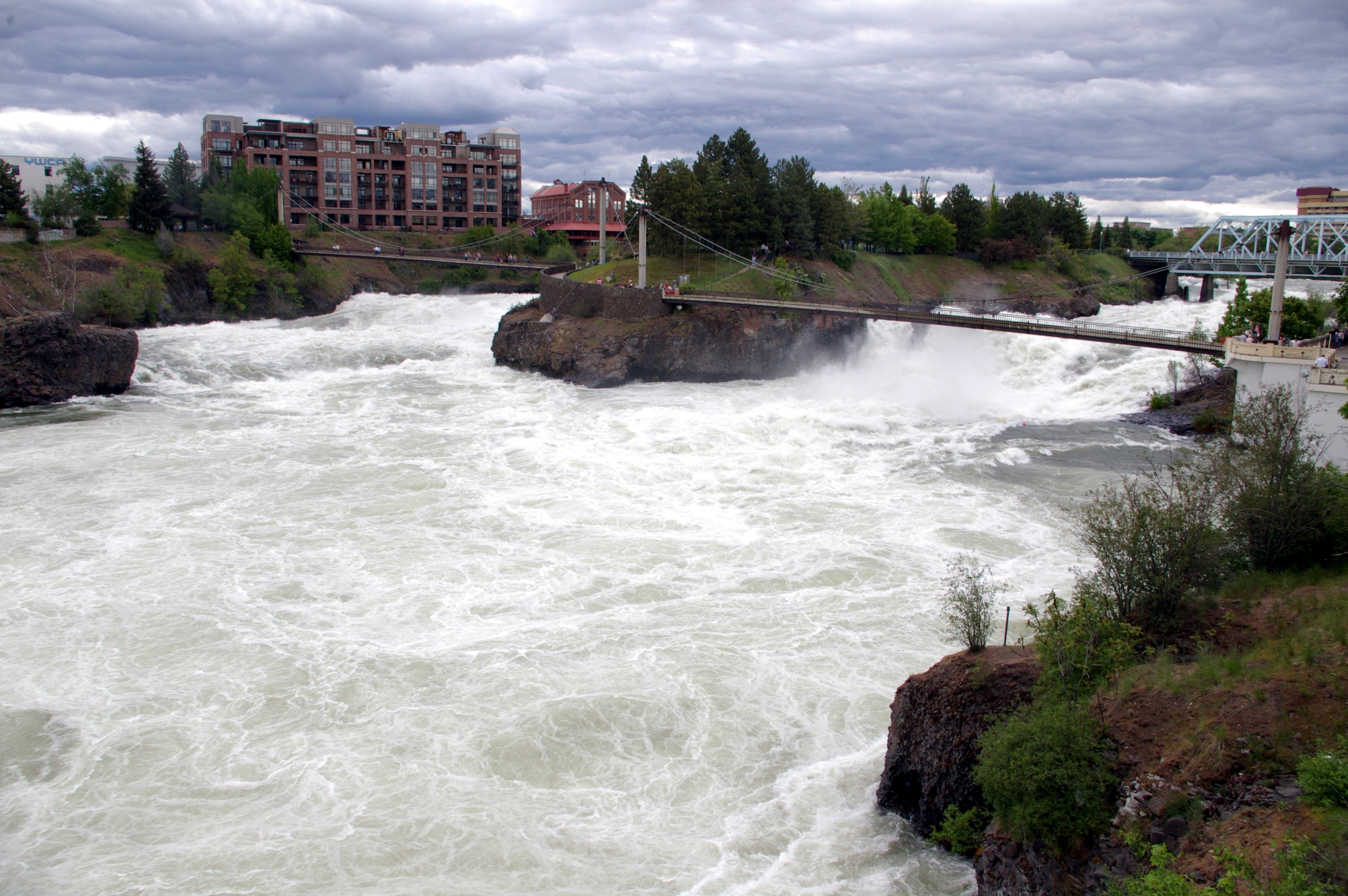
The Upper Spokane Falls of the Spokane River flowing by Canada island

Spokane lies mostly within the Spokane Valley Outwash Plains at the periphery of the North Central Rockies forests ecoregion and partly within the eastern edge of the basaltic Channeled Scablands steppe of the Columbia Plateau ecoregion, a plain that eventually rises sharply to the east towards the rugged, timbered Selkirk Mountains. The foothills of the Rockies—the Coeur d'Alene Mountains—rise about 25 miles (40 km) to the east in north Idaho. The city is in a transition area between the barren landscape of the Columbia Basin and the coniferous forests to the east; to the south are the lush prairies and rolling hills of the Palouse. The highest peak in Spokane County is Mount Spokane, at an elevation of 5,883 feet (1,793 m), on the eastern side of the Selkirk Mountains. The Spokane River is the area's most prominent water feature, a 111-mile (179 km) tributary of the Columbia River, originating from Lake Coeur d'Alene in northern Idaho. The river flows west across the Washington state line through downtown Spokane, meeting Latah Creek, then turns to the northwest, where it is joined by the Little Spokane River on its way to the Columbia River, north of Davenport. The Channeled Scablands and many of the area's numerous large lakes, such as Lake Coeur d'Alene and Lake Pend Oreille, were formed by the Missoula Floods after the ice-dammed Glacial Lake Missoula ruptured at the end of the last ice age. The Turnbull National Wildlife Refuge south of Cheney is the closest natural reserve, the closest National Forest is the Colville National Forest, the closest National Recreation Area is the Lake Roosevelt National Recreation Area and the closest national park is Mount Rainier National Park, approximately a four-and-a-half hour drive from Spokane.

=== Cityscape ===
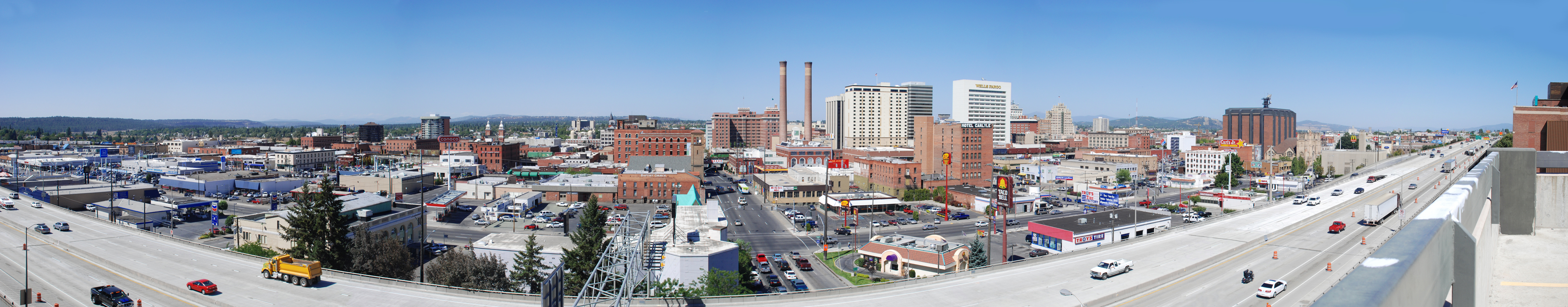
Panorama of Downtown Spokane looking north from the Deaconess Medical Center parking garage.
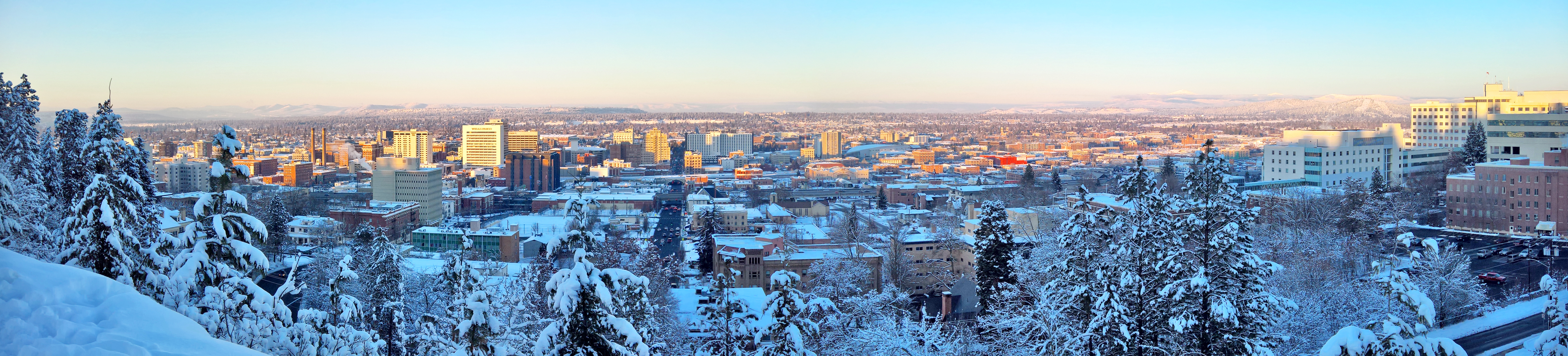
Panorama of Downtown Spokane looking north from Cliff Drive.

==== Neighborhoods ====
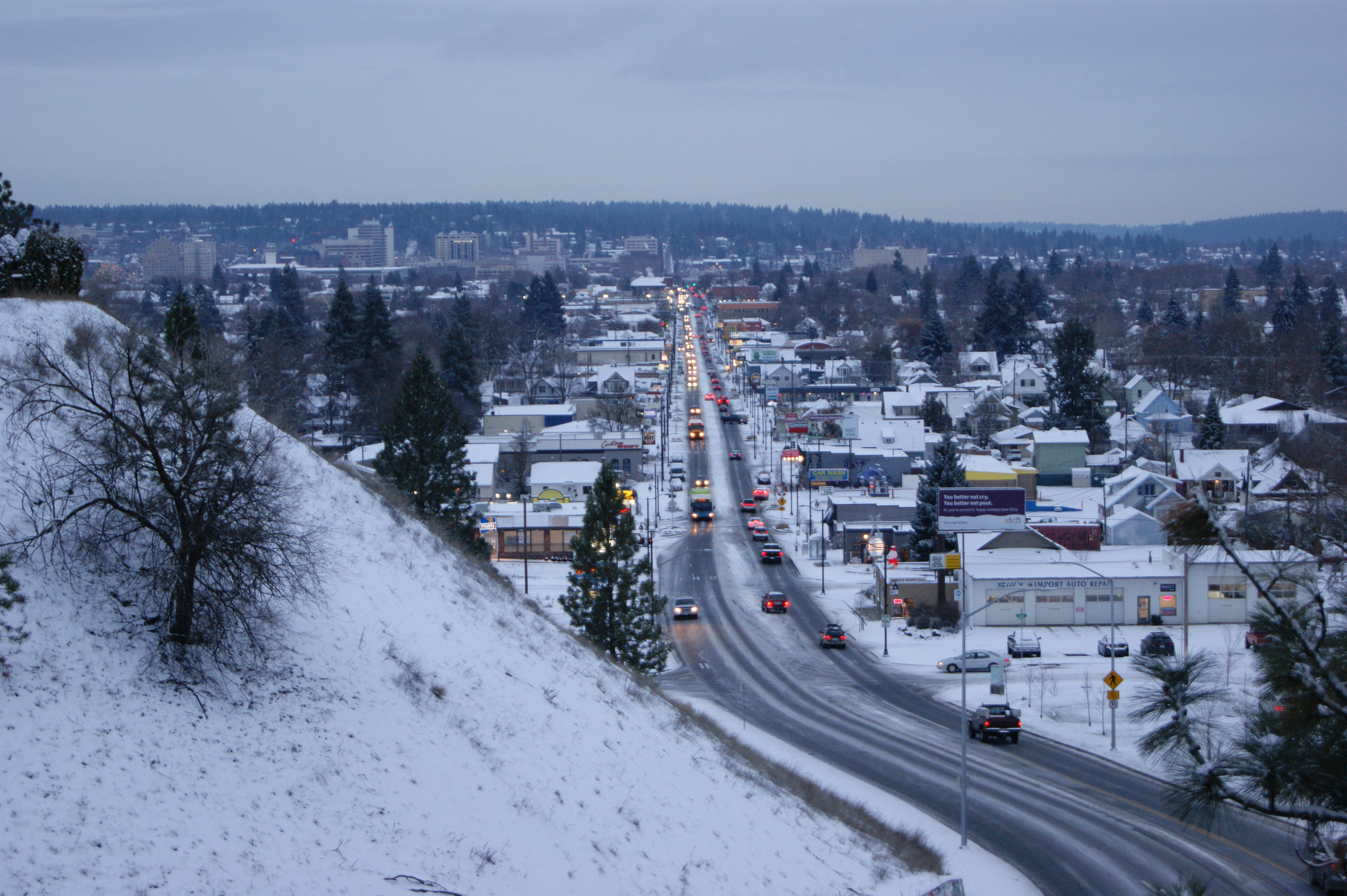
Monroe Street corridor and surrounding Emerson/Garfield neighborhood

Spokane's neighborhoods range from the Victorian-style South Hill and Browne's Addition, to the Davenport District of Downtown, to the more contemporary neighborhoods of north Spokane. Spokane's neighborhoods are gaining attention for their history, as illustrated by the city being home to 18 recognized National Register Historical Districts.

Some of Spokane's best-known neighborhoods are Riverside, Browne's Addition, and Hillyard. The Riverside neighborhood consists primarily of downtown Spokane and is the central business district of Spokane. The neighborhoods south of downtown Spokane are collectively known as the South Hill. Downtown Spokane contains many of the city's public facilities, including City Hall, Riverfront Park (site of Expo '74), and the Spokane Convention Center, First Interstate Center for the Arts and Spokane Arena. The Spokane County Courthouse and public safety campus is adjacent to downtown in the historic West Central neighborhood. To the east of downtown is East Central and the adjacent University District and budding "International District". To the west of downtown is one of Spokane's oldest and densest neighborhoods, Browne's Addition.

A National Historic District west of Downtown, Browne's Addition was Spokane's first prestigious address, notable for its array of old mansions built by Spokane's early elite in the Queen Anne and early American Craftsman styles. The area houses the Northwest Museum of Arts and Culture. In northeast Spokane, the Hillyard neighborhood began in 1892 as the chosen site for James J. Hill's Great Northern Railway yard, placed outside Spokane city limits to avoid "burdensome taxes". The downtown Hillyard Business District, located on Market Street, was the first Spokane neighborhood listed in the National Register of Historic Places. Many of the former town's houses were built to house railroad workers, mainly immigrant laborers working in the local yard, who gave Hillyard an independent, blue-collar character. Hillyard has become a home for much of Spokane's growing Russian, Ukrainian, and Southeast Asian communities.

==== Architecture ====
===== Commercial and public buildings =====
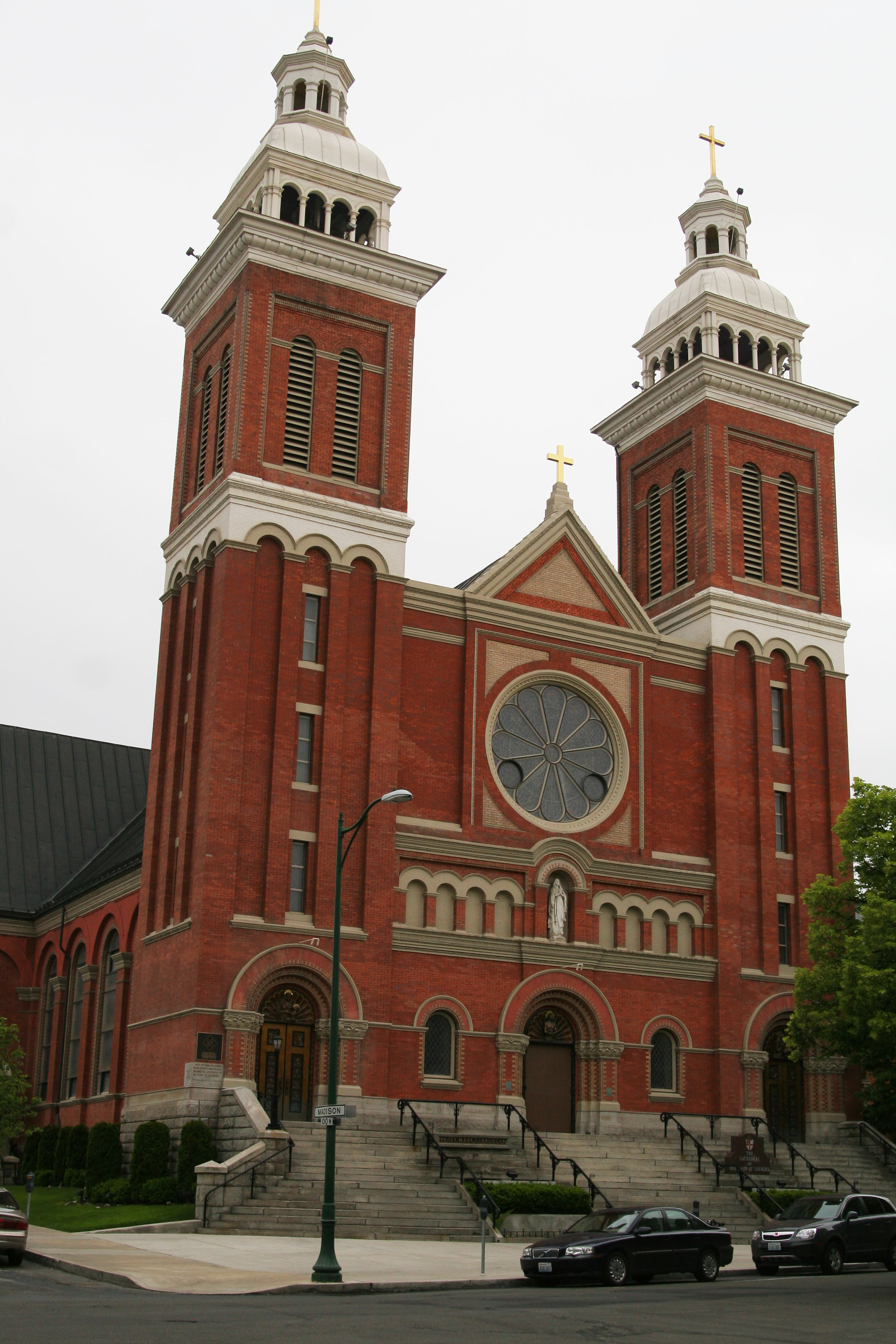
The Romanesque Revival-style Cathedral of Our Lady of Lourdes

Spokane neighborhoods contain a patchwork of architectural styles that give them a distinct identity and illustrate the changes throughout the city's history. Most of Spokane's notable buildings and landmarks are in the Riverside neighborhood and the downtown commercial district, where many of the buildings were rebuilt after the Great Fire of 1889 in the Romanesque Revival style. Examples include the Great Northern clock tower, Review Building, Cathedral of Our Lady of Lourdes, First Congregational Church, Washington Water Power Post Street substation, Peyton Building, and The Carlyle.

The principal architect of many buildings of this period was Kirtland Kelsey Cutter. Self-taught, he came to Spokane in 1886, and began by designing "Chalet Hohenstein" for himself and other residences for his family, while also working as a bank teller. Other structures designed by Cutter include the Spokane Club, Washington Water Power Substation, Monroe Street Bridge (featured in the city seal), the Steam Plant, and the Davenport Hotel. Built in renaissance and Spanish Revival style, the Davenport Hotel cost two million dollars to complete and included new technologies at the time of its opening in September 1914, such as chilled water, elevators, and air cooling.

In the second half of the 20th century, Spokane again became noticed for its architecture, this time by a new generation of architects in the modernist movement, which flourished in the city. During this period which lasted from 1948 to the mid-1970s, prolific architects in the city gave Spokane a great breadth of mid-century architecture. The modernists in Spokane gave the city a new look and were instrumental in the developments, design, and legacy of the Expo '74 World's Fair in what is now Riverfront Park.

During this time, one of the city's foremost and influential architects was Warren C. Heylman. Heylman's career was most productive during the 1960s and 1970s where his main body of work was done in the modernist style, designing numerous residential houses, apartment buildings, and architectural embellishments. Some of his most noteworthy works in Spokane include The Parkade, Spokane International Airport, Spokane Regional Health Building, and the Burlington Northern Latah Creek Bridge over Hangman Valley.

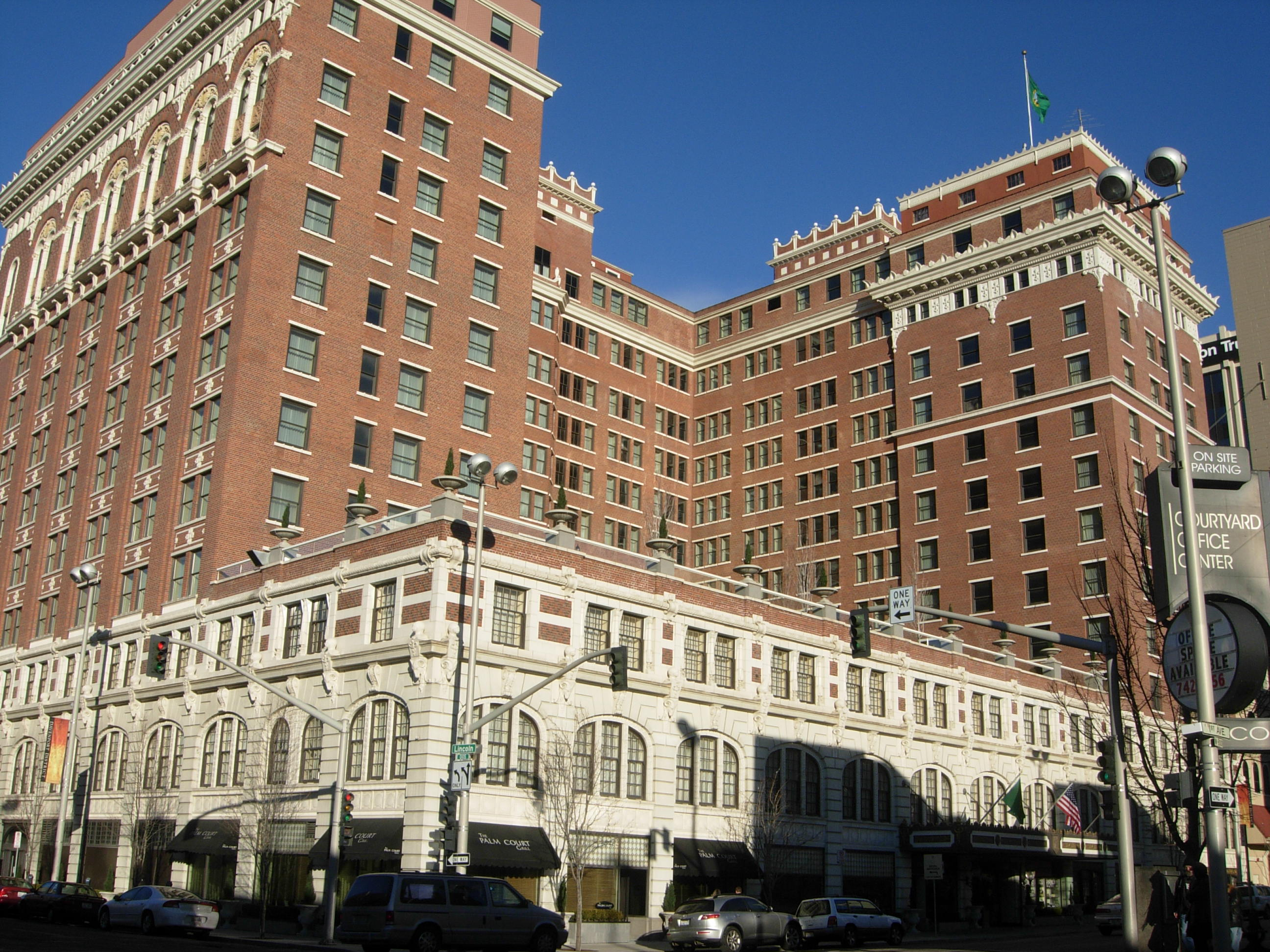
The Renaissance Revival-style Davenport Hotel designed by Kirtland Cutter

Other well-represented architectural styles downtown include Art Deco (Spokane City Hall, Paulsen Center, Fox Theater, John R. Rogers High School, City Ramp Garage), Renaissance Revival (Steam Plant Square, Thomas S. Foley Courthouse, Legion Building, San Marco), Neoclassical (Masonic Center, Hutton Building, Bing Crosby Theater), Chicago School (U.S. Bank Building, Liberty Building, Old City Hall) and Modernist (The Parkade, Ridpath Hotel, Bank of America Financial Center). The tallest building in the city, at 288 feet (88 m), is the Bank of America Financial Center. Also of note is the Spokane County Courthouse in West Central (the building on the seal of Spokane County), the Cathedral of St. John the Evangelist in Rockwood, the Benewah Milk Bottles in Riverside and Garland, Mount Saint Michael in Hillyard, and the Cambern Dutch Shop Windmill in South Perry.

===== Residential =====
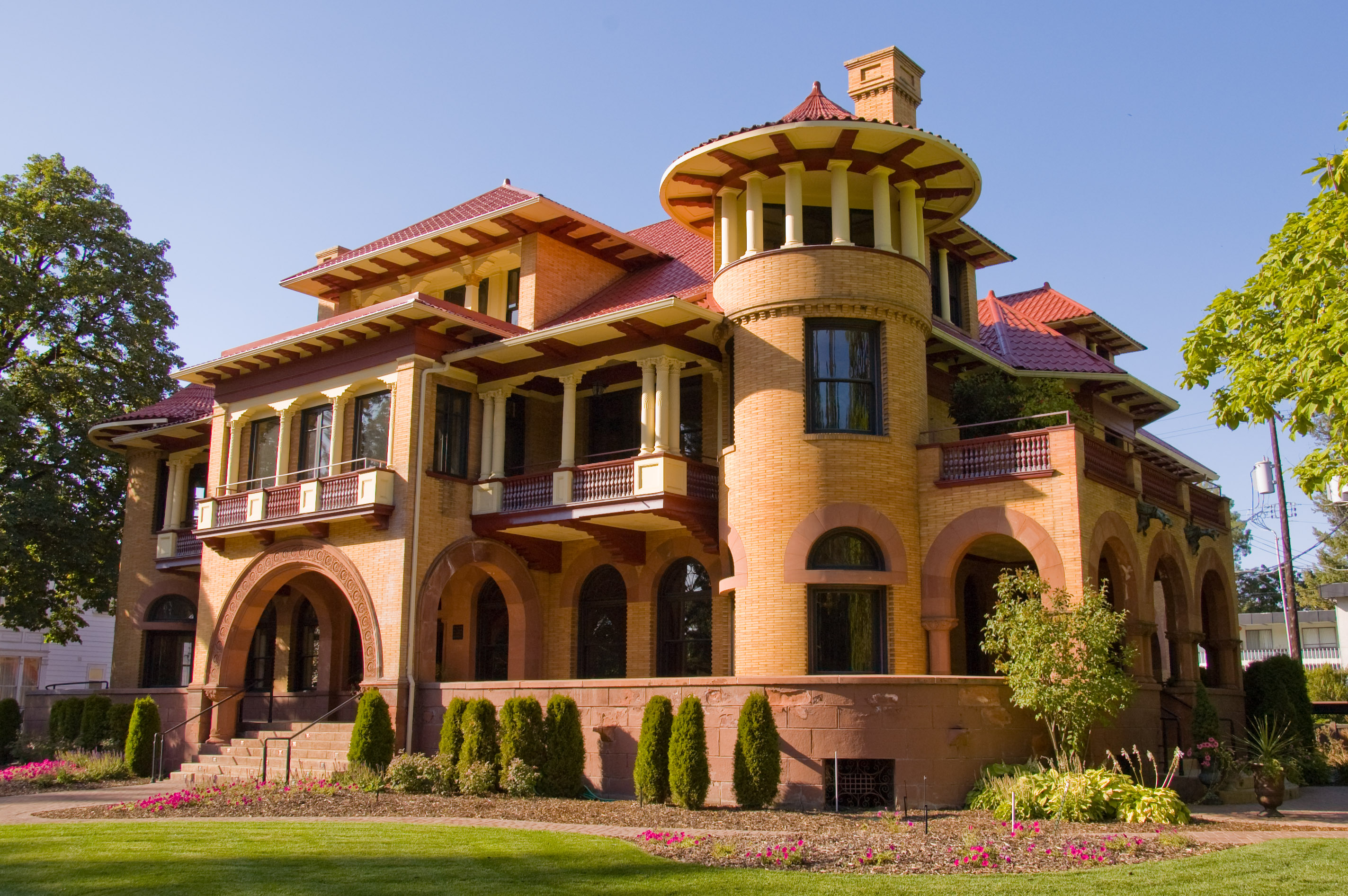
Patsy Clark Mansion in Browne's Addition

As an early affluent Spokane neighborhood, the Browne's Addition neighborhood and residences contain the largest variety of residential architecture in the city. These residences are lavish and personalized, featuring many architectural styles that were popular and trendy in the Pacific Northwest from the late 19th century to 1930, such as the Victorian and Queen Anne styles. In high demand following his firms' design of the Idaho Building at the Chicago World's Fair in 1893, Cutter found work constructing many mansions for mining and railroad tycoons such as Patrick "Patsy" Clark and Daniel C. Corbin and son Austin.

The older neighborhoods of the early 20th century, such as West Central, East Central, Logan, Hillyard, and much of the lower South Hill, feature a large concentration of American Craftsman style bungalows. In Hillyard, the most architecturally intact neighborhood in Spokane, 85 percent of these buildings are historic. As the city expanded mainly to the north in the middle of the 20th century, the bungalows in the "minimal traditional" style commonplace from the 1930s to the 1950s tend to predominate in the Northwest, North Hill, and Bemiss neighborhoods. This architectural style occupies the neighborhoods where the integrity of Spokane's street grid pattern is largely intact (especially the areas north of downtown and south of Francis Ave.), and the houses have backyard alleys for carports, deliveries, and refuse collection. Contemporary suburbs and architecture are prevalent at the north and south edges of Spokane as well as in the new Kendall Yards neighborhood north of downtown.

==== Parks and recreation ====
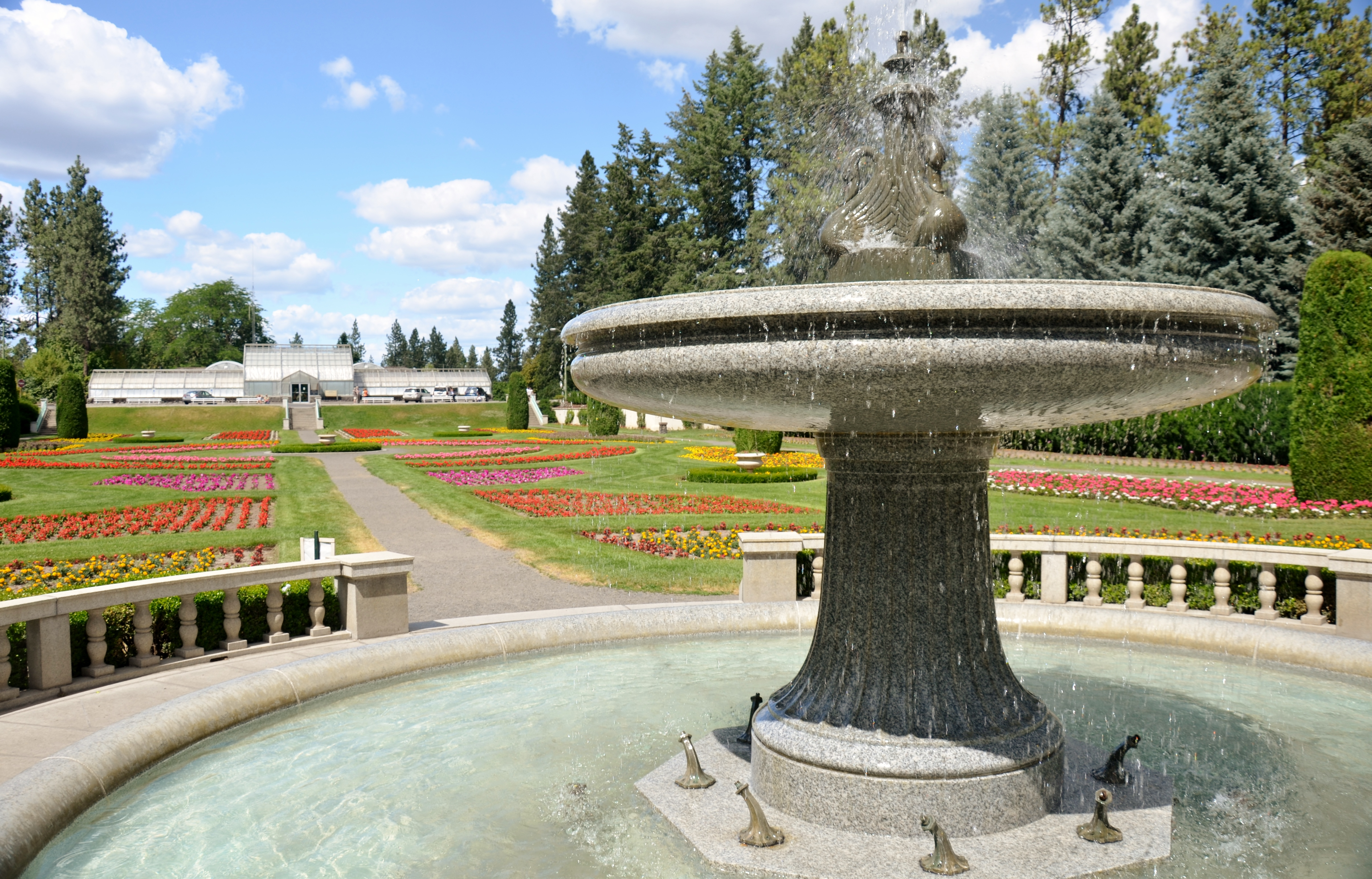
Duncan Garden at Manito Park

In 1907, Spokane's board of park commissioners retained the services of the Olmsted Brothers to draw up a plan for Spokane's parks. Much of Spokane's park land was acquired by the city prior to World War I, establishing it early on as a leader among Western cities in the development of a citywide park system. Spokane has a system of over 87 parks totaling 4,100 acres (17 km^{2}) and includes six neighborhood aquatic centers. Some of the most notable parks in Spokane's system are Riverfront Park, Manito Park and Botanical Gardens, Riverside State Park, Saint Michael's Mission State Park, John A. Finch Arboretum, High Bridge Park and Liberty Park.

Riverfront Park, created after Expo '74 and occupying the same site, is 100 acres (40 ha) in downtown Spokane and the site of some of Spokane's largest events. The park has views of the Spokane Falls and holds a number of civic attractions, including a skyride, a rebuilt gondola lift that carries visitors across the falls from high above the river gorge. The park also includes the historic hand-carved Riverfront Park Looff carousel created in 1909 by Charles I. D. Looff. Riverfront Park is currently being renovated and modernized (as of October 2016). Manito Park and Botanical Gardens on Spokane's South Hill features the Duncan Gardens, a classical European Renaissance-style garden and the Nishinomiya Japanese Garden designed by Nagao Sakurai. Riverside State Park, close to downtown, is a site for outdoor activities such as hiking, mountain biking, and horse riding.

The Spokane area has many trails and rail trails, the most notable of which is the Spokane River Centennial Trail, which features over 37.5 miles (60.4 km) of paved trails running along the Spokane River from Spokane to the Idaho border. This trail continues on towards Coeur d'Alene for 24 miles (39 km) as the North Idaho Centennial Trail and is often used for alternative transportation and recreational use. In the summer, it has long been popular to visit North Idaho's "Lake Country", such as Lake Coeur d'Alene, Lake Pend Oreille, Priest Lake, or one of the other nearby bodies of water and beaches. In the winter, the public has access to five ski resorts within a couple hours of the city. The closest of these is the Mt. Spokane Ski and Snowboard Park, which has trails for cross-country skiing, snowshoeing, snowmobiling, and dog sledding.

Zoological parks in Spokane include Cat Tales Zoological Park, a wildlife sanctuary primarily for big cats and the Blue Zoo an interactive aquarium in the NorthTown Mall.

=== Flora and fauna ===
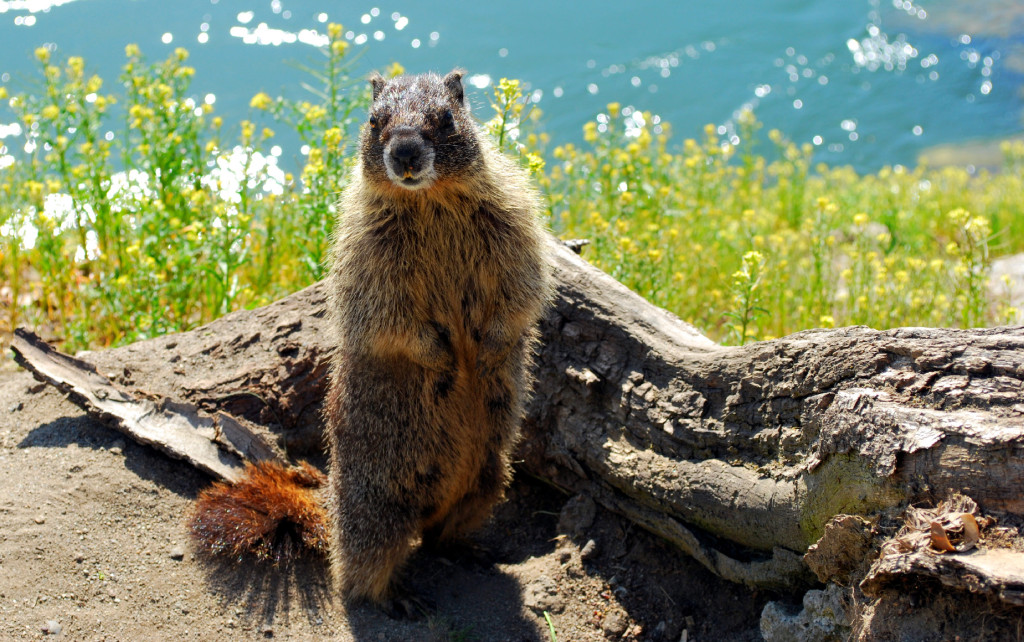
Urban-dwelling yellow bellied marmots are resident in the city, although the rodents typically inhabit remote, mountainous locations.

The area supports an abundance of wildlife in part because of its varied geology and natural history. The area contains a wide range of vegetation, from densely wooded coniferous forests to rolling grassy hills and meadows. Ponderosa pine and Douglas fir are common in the drier and lower elevation areas throughout the region. The ponderosa pine is the official tree of the City of Spokane, which is where specimens were first collected by botanist David Douglas in 1826.^{[g]}

The Canadian Rockies ecoregion supports 70 mammals, 16 reptiles and amphibians, 168 birds, and 41 fish species. There is a high concentration of raptors in the area, bald eagles are a common sight near Lake Coeur d'Alene in December and January when kokanee spawn. The most common fish present in area lakes is the Washington-native rainbow trout, which is the official fish of Washington state. Big game common in eastern Washington include black and grizzly bears, caribou, Rocky Mountain elk, bighorn sheep, and cougar. Whitetail deer, mule deer, and moose are also found in abundance. The gray wolf population has been making a recovery in the Inland Northwest. As of June 2016, there are 16 wolf packs in eastern Washington. In August 2016, photo evidence confirmed a solitary wolf in Mount Spokane State Park.

Although the ecoregion remains ecologically intact, it faces conservation challenges that include the negative effects of certain forestry management and logging practices, higher risks of forest fires due to the alteration of the trees that make up the forest composition, and habitat fragmentation as a result of urban sprawl and development, which endangers the long-term survival of vulnerable species such as mountain caribou and the American goshawk.

=== Climate ===
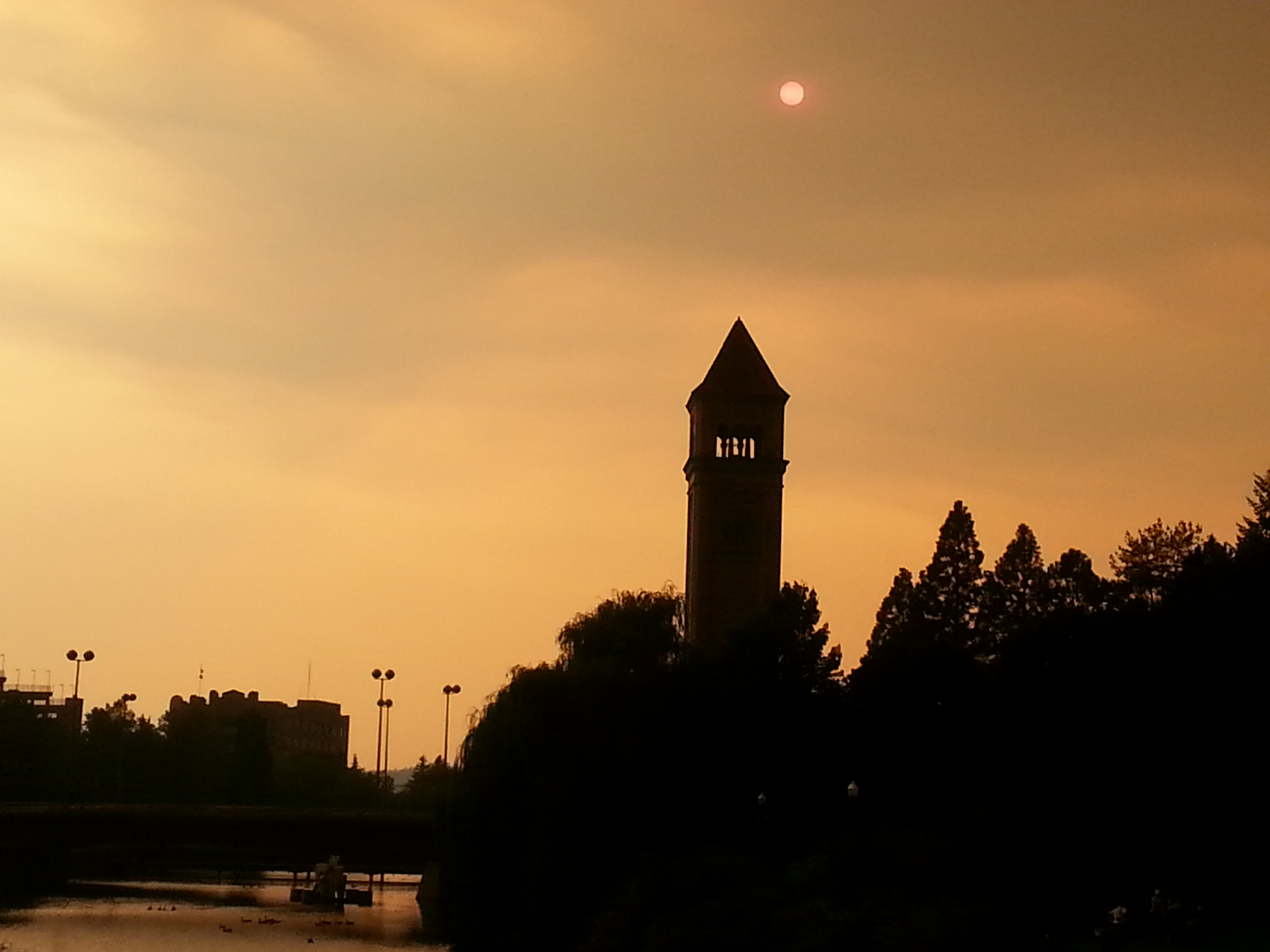
The Great Northern clocktower seen amidst an orange haze from wildfire smoke and Rayleigh scattering

Spokane has a Mediterranean-influenced warm-summer humid continental climate (Dsb under the Köppen classification), a very rare climate globally, due to its relatively cold winters, elevation and dry-summer precipitation pattern.

The area typically has a warm, arid climate during the summer months, bracketed by short spring and fall seasons. On average, the warmest month is July and the coolest month is December; July averages 71.0 °F (21.7 °C), while December averages 29.1 °F (−1.6 °C).^{[h]} Daily temperature ranges are large during the summer, often exceeding 30 °F (17 °C), and small during the winter, with a range just above 10 °F (5.6 °C). The record high and low are 112 °F (44 °C) and −30 °F (−34 °C), but temperatures of more than 100 °F (38 °C) or less than −5 °F (−21 °C) are rare. Temperatures of 90 °F (32 °C)+ occur an average of 21 days annually, temperatures of 100 °F (38 °C)+ occur an average of only 1 day annually, and those at or below 0 °F (−18 °C) average 2.2 days a year.

Climate chart for Spokane

Spokane's location, between the Cascades Range to the west and the Rocky Mountains to the east and north, protects it from weather patterns experienced in other parts of the Pacific Northwest. The Cascade Mountains form a barrier to the eastward flow of moist and relatively mild air from the Pacific Ocean in winter and cool air in summer. As a result of the rain shadow effect of the Cascades, the Spokane area has 16.5 inches (420 mm) average annual precipitation, less than half of Seattle's 39.3 inches (1,000 mm). Precipitation peaks in December, and summer is the driest time of the year. The Rockies shield Spokane from some of the winter season's coldest air masses traveling southward across Canada. In the summer season, Spokane, like much of the western United States, has been experiencing drier conditions and more frequent and larger wildfire events since the late 20th century; the fine particulate matter in the smoke can be carried by the wind and blanket the region in a haze and impact Spokane's air quality.

Climate data for Spokane International Airport, 1991–2020 normals, (Note: Mean maxima and minima (i.e., the highest and lowest temperature readings during an entire month or year) calculated based on data at said location from 1991 to 2020.) extremes 1881–present (Note: Official records for Spokane kept at Spokane Weather Bureau Office from February 1881 to July 1889, and at Spokane International Airport since August 1889.)
Month	Jan	Feb	Mar	Apr	May	Jun	Jul	Aug	Sep	Oct	Nov	Dec	Year
Record high °F (°C)	62 (17)	63 (17)	75 (24)	90 (32)	97 (36)	109 (43)	108 (42)	108 (42)	99 (37)	87 (31)	70 (21)	60 (16)	109 (43)
Mean maximum °F (°C)	48.2 (9.0)	51.1 (10.6)	63.0 (17.2)	73.9 (23.3)	84.0 (28.9)	90.5 (32.5)	97.5 (36.4)	97.0 (36.1)	89.2 (31.8)	74.6 (23.7)	56.4 (13.6)	48.0 (8.9)	99.1 (37.3)
Mean daily maximum °F (°C)	34.5 (1.4)	39.5 (4.2)	48.6 (9.2)	56.9 (13.8)	67.1 (19.5)	73.7 (23.2)	84.4 (29.1)	83.8 (28.8)	73.6 (23.1)	57.7 (14.3)	42.3 (5.7)	33.8 (1.0)	58.0 (14.4)
Daily mean °F (°C)	29.6 (−1.3)	32.9 (0.5)	40.0 (4.4)	47.0 (8.3)	56.0 (13.3)	62.3 (16.8)	71.0 (21.7)	70.3 (21.3)	61.1 (16.2)	47.9 (8.8)	36.3 (2.4)	29.1 (−1.6)	48.6 (9.2)
Mean daily minimum °F (°C)	24.7 (−4.1)	26.3 (−3.2)	31.5 (−0.3)	37.0 (2.8)	44.9 (7.2)	50.8 (10.4)	57.6 (14.2)	56.7 (13.7)	48.6 (9.2)	38.0 (3.3)	30.3 (−0.9)	24.3 (−4.3)	39.2 (4.0)
Mean minimum °F (°C)	4.4 (−15.3)	9.8 (−12.3)	18.5 (−7.5)	26.4 (−3.1)	32.7 (0.4)	40.2 (4.6)	45.9 (7.7)	45.6 (7.6)	35.4 (1.9)	23.2 (−4.9)	14.1 (−9.9)	7.1 (−13.8)	−3.0 (−19.4)
Record low °F (°C)	−30 (−34)	−24 (−31)	−10 (−23)	14 (−10)	24 (−4)	33 (1)	37 (3)	35 (2)	22 (−6)	7 (−14)	−21 (−29)	−25 (−32)	−30 (−34)
Average precipitation inches (mm)	1.97 (50)	1.44 (37)	1.83 (46)	1.25 (32)	1.55 (39)	1.17 (30)	0.42 (11)	0.47 (12)	0.58 (15)	1.37 (35)	2.06 (52)	2.34 (59)	16.45 (418)
Average snowfall inches (cm)	12.3 (31)	7.8 (20)	3.9 (9.9)	0.7 (1.8)	0.1 (0.25)	0.0 (0.0)	0.0 (0.0)	0.0 (0.0)	0.1 (0.25)	0.5 (1.3)	6.2 (16)	13.8 (35)	45.4 (115)
Average extreme snow depth inches (cm)	8.1 (21)	4.9 (12)	2.8 (7.1)	0.2 (0.51)	0.0 (0.0)	0.0 (0.0)	0.0 (0.0)	0.0 (0.0)	0.1 (0.25)	0.4 (1.0)	2.7 (6.9)	6.4 (16)	11.1 (28)
Average precipitation days (≥ 0.01 in)	14.2	10.9	11.8	10.3	9.7	7.8	4.0	3.2	4.7	8.9	13.4	13.8	112.7
Average snowy days (≥ 0.1 in)	9.5	5.7	4.0	1.0	0.3	0.0	0.0	0.0	0.1	0.3	4.3	9.5	34.7
Average relative humidity (%)	82.5	79.1	70.3	61.0	58.2	53.9	44.0	45.0	53.9	66.6	82.7	85.5	65.2
Average dew point °F (°C)	21.9 (−5.6)	26.1 (−3.3)	28.6 (−1.9)	31.6 (−0.2)	37.8 (3.2)	43.0 (6.1)	43.5 (6.4)	43.2 (6.2)	39.6 (4.2)	34.7 (1.5)	30.0 (−1.1)	23.7 (−4.6)	33.6 (0.9)
Mean monthly sunshine hours	78.3	118.0	199.3	242.3	296.7	322.8	382.4	340.4	271.2	191.0	73.8	59.1	2,575.3
Percentage possible sunshine	28	41	54	59	63	68	79	77	72	57	26	22	54
Source: NOAA (relative humidity and sun 1961–1990)

Climate data for Spokane (Felts Field), 1991–2020 normals, (Note: Mean maxima and minima calculated based on data from November 1998 to December 2020 for months and 1999 to 2020 for years.) extremes 1998 (Note: Starting on October 14, 1998.)–present
Month	Jan	Feb	Mar	Apr	May	Jun	Jul	Aug	Sep	Oct	Nov	Dec	Year
Record high °F (°C)	59 (15)	64 (18)	74 (23)	87 (31)	94 (34)	113 (45)	106 (41)	107 (42)	97 (36)	86 (30)	69 (21)	63 (17)	113 (45)
Mean maximum °F (°C)	51.8 (11.0)	53.7 (12.1)	65.0 (18.3)	76.5 (24.7)	86.7 (30.4)	93.0 (33.9)	99.8 (37.7)	99.1 (37.3)	90.7 (32.6)	75.5 (24.2)	59.8 (15.4)	51.9 (11.1)	101.4 (38.6)
Mean daily maximum °F (°C)	37.8 (3.2)	42.5 (5.8)	51.3 (10.7)	59.6 (15.3)	69.7 (20.9)	75.8 (24.3)	87.1 (30.6)	86.2 (30.1)	76.0 (24.4)	60.3 (15.7)	45.1 (7.3)	36.9 (2.7)	60.7 (15.9)
Daily mean °F (°C)	31.8 (−0.1)	34.6 (1.4)	41.5 (5.3)	48.1 (8.9)	56.9 (13.8)	63.1 (17.3)	71.5 (21.9)	70.4 (21.3)	61.4 (16.3)	49.1 (9.5)	37.9 (3.3)	31.3 (−0.4)	49.8 (9.9)
Mean daily minimum °F (°C)	25.8 (−3.4)	26.7 (−2.9)	31.7 (−0.2)	36.6 (2.6)	44.1 (6.7)	50.4 (10.2)	56.0 (13.3)	54.5 (12.5)	46.8 (8.2)	38.0 (3.3)	30.7 (−0.7)	25.7 (−3.5)	38.9 (3.8)
Mean minimum °F (°C)	9.9 (−12.3)	13.5 (−10.3)	19.6 (−6.9)	26.8 (−2.9)	32.5 (0.3)	41.4 (5.2)	46.5 (8.1)	45.7 (7.6)	36.3 (2.4)	25.0 (−3.9)	17.6 (−8.0)	10.3 (−12.1)	3.2 (−16.0)
Record low °F (°C)	−10 (−23)	−3 (−19)	2 (−17)	24 (−4)	28 (−2)	37 (3)	39 (4)	40 (4)	26 (−3)	12 (−11)	−2 (−19)	−10 (−23)	−10 (−23)
Average precipitation inches (mm)	2.00 (51)	1.32 (34)	1.82 (46)	1.50 (38)	1.70 (43)	1.48 (38)	0.67 (17)	0.54 (14)	0.68 (17)	1.46 (37)	2.01 (51)	2.18 (55)	17.36 (441)
Average precipitation days (≥ 0.01 in)	14.6	11.6	13.1	11.0	10.0	8.9	3.0	3.4	5.3	10.4	13.5	14.5	119.3
Source: NOAA

See or edit raw graph data.

== Demographics ==
Historical population
Census	Pop.	Note	%±
1880	350		—
1890	19,922		5,592.0%
1900	36,848		85.0%
1910	104,402		183.3%
1920	104,437		0.0%
1930	115,514		10.6%
1940	122,001		5.6%
1950	161,721		32.6%
1960	181,608		12.3%
1970	170,516		−6.1%
1980	171,300		0.5%
1990	177,165		3.4%
2000	195,629		10.4%
2010	208,916		6.8%
2020	228,989		9.6%
2024 (est.)	230,783		0.8%
U.S. Decennial Census 2020 Census

=== Racial and ethnic composition ===
Spokane, Washington – Racial and ethnic composition Note: the US Census treats Hispanic/Latino as an ethnic category. This table excludes Latinos from the racial categories and assigns them to a separate category. Hispanics/Latinos may be of any race.
Race / Ethnicity (NH = Non-Hispanic)	Pop 2000	Pop 2010	Pop 2020	% 2000	% 2010	% 2020
White alone (NH)	171,918	175,482	176,397	87.88%	84.00%	77.03%
Black or African American alone (NH)	3,898	4,643	5,921	1.99%	2.22%	2.59%
Native American or Alaska Native alone (NH)	3,208	3,663	3,726	1.64%	1.75%	1.63%
Asian alone (NH)	4,343	5,266	6,407	2.22%	2.52%	2.80%
Pacific Islander alone (NH)	348	1,152	2,665	0.18%	0.55%	1.16%
Other race alone (NH)	285	281	1,211	0.15%	0.13%	0.53%
Mixed Race or Multi-Racial (NH)	5,772	7,962	16,604	2.95%	3.81%	7.25%
Hispanic or Latino (any race)	5,857	10,467	16,058	2.99%	5.01%	7.01%
Total	195,629	208,916	228,989	100.00%	100.00%	100.00%

=== 2020 census ===
As of the 2020 census, Spokane had a population of 228,989. The median age was 36.6 years, 21.0% of residents were under the age of 18, and 16.2% of residents were 65 years of age or older. For every 100 females there were 96.8 males, and for every 100 females age 18 and over there were 94.9 males age 18 and over.

According to the 2020 census, 99.9% of residents lived in urban areas and 0.1% lived in rural areas.

There were 94,494 households in Spokane, of which 26.3% had children under the age of 18 living in them, 37.9% were married-couple households, 22.0% were households with a male householder and no spouse or partner present, and 30.6% were households with a female householder and no spouse or partner present. About 34.2% of all households were made up of individuals and 12.9% had someone living alone who was 65 years of age or older.

There were 99,938 housing units, of which 5.4% were vacant. The homeowner vacancy rate was 1.3% and the rental vacancy rate was 5.1%.

Racial composition as of the 2020 census
Race	Number	Percent
White	181,516	79.3%
Black or African American	6,196	2.7%
American Indian and Alaska Native	4,344	1.9%
Asian	6,519	2.8%
Native Hawaiian and Other Pacific Islander	2,712	1.2%
Some other race	5,445	2.4%
Two or more races	22,257	9.7%
Hispanic or Latino (of any race)	16,058	7.0%

=== 2022 American Community Survey ===
As of the 2022 American Community Survey estimates, there were 230,176 people and 101,130 households. The population density was 3,347.5 inhabitants per square mile (1,292.5/km^{2}). There were 105,002 housing units at an average density of 1,527.1 per square mile (589.6/km^{2}). The racial makeup of the city was 80.7% White, 2.9% some other race, 2.5% Black or African American, 2.0% Asian, 0.8% Native American or Alaskan Native, and 0.5% Native Hawaiian or Other Pacific Islander, with 10.5% from two or more races. Hispanics or Latinos of any race were 8.1% of the population.

Of the 101,130 households, 24.5% had children under the age of 18 living with them, 29.8% had seniors 65 years or older living with them, 35.9% were married couples living together, 7.9% were couples cohabitating, 24.8% had a male householder with no partner present, and 31.4% had a female householder with no partner present. The median household size was 2.21 and the median family size was 2.96.

The age distribution was 18.8% under 18, 9.9% from 18 to 24, 30.8% from 25 to 44, 22.9% from 45 to 64, and 17.6% who were 65 or older. The median age was 38.6 years. For every 100 females, there were 101.4 males.

The median income for a household was $62,287, with family households having a median income of $90,205 and non-family households $41,670. The per capita income was $38,173. Males working full-time jobs had median earnings of $57,382 compared to $51,996 for females. Out of the 225,660 people with a determined poverty status, 11.8% were below the poverty line. Further, 14.7% of minors and 8.8% of seniors were below the poverty line.

In the survey, residents self-identified with various ethnic ancestries. People of German descent made up 19.5% of the population of the town, followed by English at 13.1%, Irish at 11.5%, American at 7.6%, Norwegian at 5.5%, Italian at 4.3%, Scottish at 2.7%, Swedish at 2.3%, French at 2.2%, Polish at 2.0%, Welsh at 1.5%, Ukrainian at 1.3%, Dutch at 1.2%, Scotch-Irish at 1.1%, Arab at 1.0%, Russian at 1.0%, Danish at 0.7%, Sub-Saharan African at 0.6%, Czech at 0.6%, and Swiss at 0.6%.

=== 2010 census ===
As of the 2010 census, there were 208,916 people, 87,271 households, and 49,204 families residing in the city. The population density was 3,526.0 inhabitants per square mile (1,361.4/km^{2}). There were 94,291 housing units at an average density of 1,591.4 per square mile (614.4/km^{2}). The racial make-up of the city was 86.7% White, 2.6% Asian, 2.3% African American, 2.0% Native American, 0.6% Pacific Islander, and 1.3% from other races. 5.0% of residents were of Hispanic or Latino heritage, of any race.

There were 87,271 households, of which 28.9% had children under the age of 18 living with them, 38.5% were married couples living together, 12.9% had a female householder with no husband present, 5.0% had a male householder with no wife present, and 43.6% were non-families. In 2010, 34.2% of all households were made up of individuals, and 11% had someone living alone who was 65 years of age or older. The average household size was 2.31 and the average family size was 2.97.

The median age in the city was 35 years. In Spokane, 22.4% of residents were under the age of 18, 12.3% were between the ages of 18 and 24, 27.6% were from 25 to 44, 25.1% were from 45 to 64, and 12.8% were 65 years of age or older. The gender make-up of the city was 48.8% male and 51.2% female.

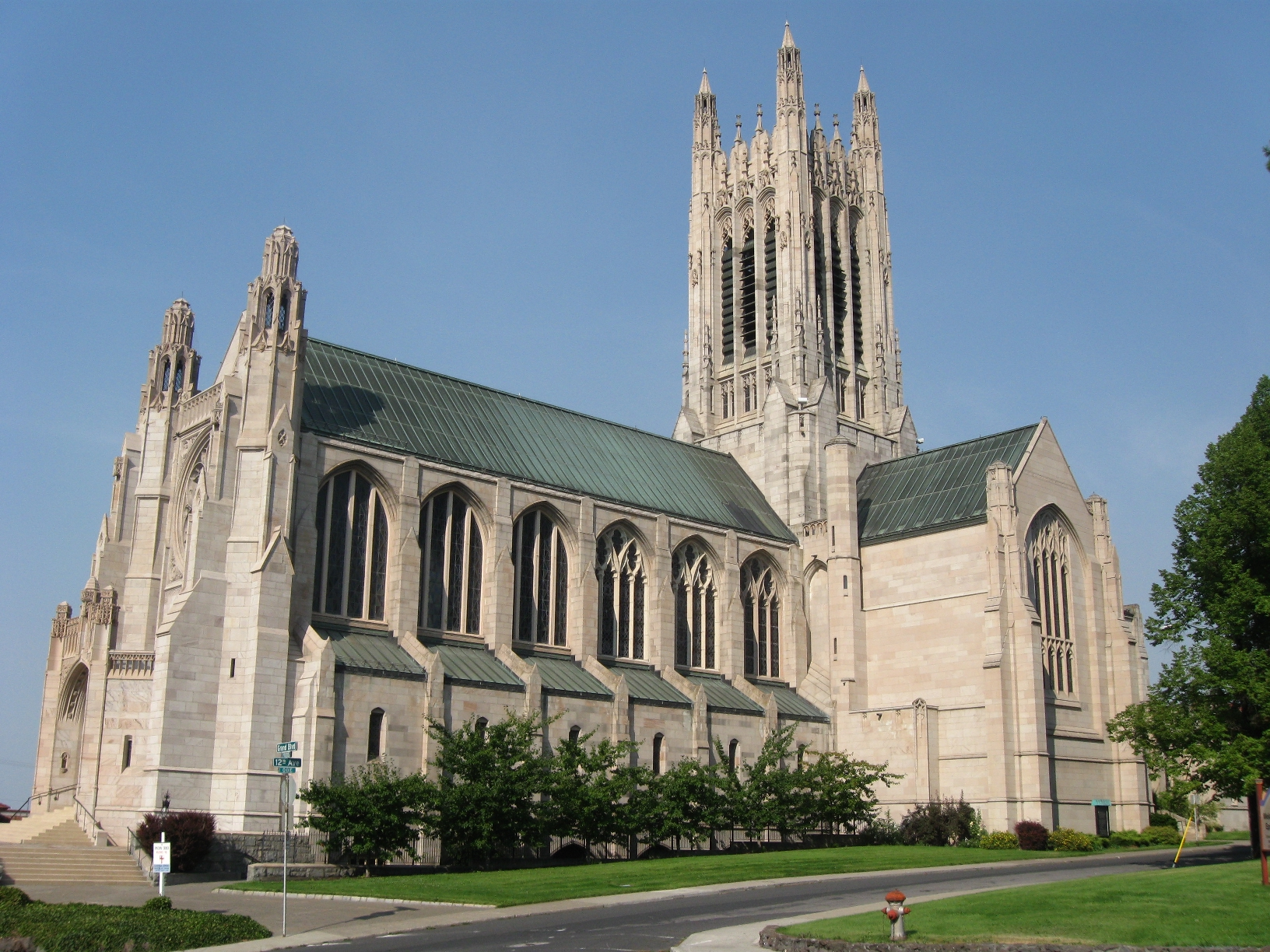
Cathedral of St. John the Evangelist

=== Religion ===
According to the Association of Religion Data Archives' 2010 Metro Area Membership Report, the denominational affiliations of the Spokane MSA are 64,277 Evangelical Protestant, 682 Black Protestant, 24,826 Mainline Protestant, 754 Orthodox, 66,202 Catholic, 31,674 Other, and 339,338 Unclaimed. As of 2016, there are also at least three Jewish congregations.

The Emanu-El congregation erected the first synagogue in Spokane and the state of Washington on September 14, 1892. The city's first mosque opened in 2009 as the Spokane Islamic Center. Spokane, like Washington and the Pacific Northwest region as a whole, is part of the Unchurched Belt, a region characterized by low church membership rates and religious participation. The city serves as the seat of the Roman Catholic Diocese of Spokane, which was established in 1913, and the Episcopal Diocese of Spokane, established in 1929. The Spokane Washington Temple, established in 1999, serves Latter-day Saints from the east of the county.

Spokane has hosted an annual multicultural celebration, Unity in the Community, since 1995. The city has become more diverse in recent decades. People from countries in the former Soviet Union (especially Russians and Ukrainians) form a comparatively large demographic in Spokane and Spokane County, the result of a large influx of immigrants and their families after the dissolution of the USSR in 1991. According to the 2000 Census, the number of people of Russian or Ukrainian ancestry in Spokane County was reported to be 7,700 (4,900 residing in the city of Spokane), amounting to two percent of the county. Among the fastest-growing demographics in Spokane is the Pacific Islander ethnic group, which is estimated to be the third-largest minority group in the county, after the Russian and Ukrainian community and Latinos. Spokane was once home to a sizable Asian community, mostly Japanese, centered in a district called Chinatown from the early days of the city until 1974. As in many western railway towns, the Asian community started off as an encampment for migrant laborers working on the railroads. The Chinatown Asian community thrived until the 1940s and experienced a population boom during WWII as Japanese families fled the exclusion zones along the coast, after which its population decreased and became integrated and dispersed, losing its Asian character; urban blight and the preparations leading up to Expo '74 led to Chinatown's eventual demolition.

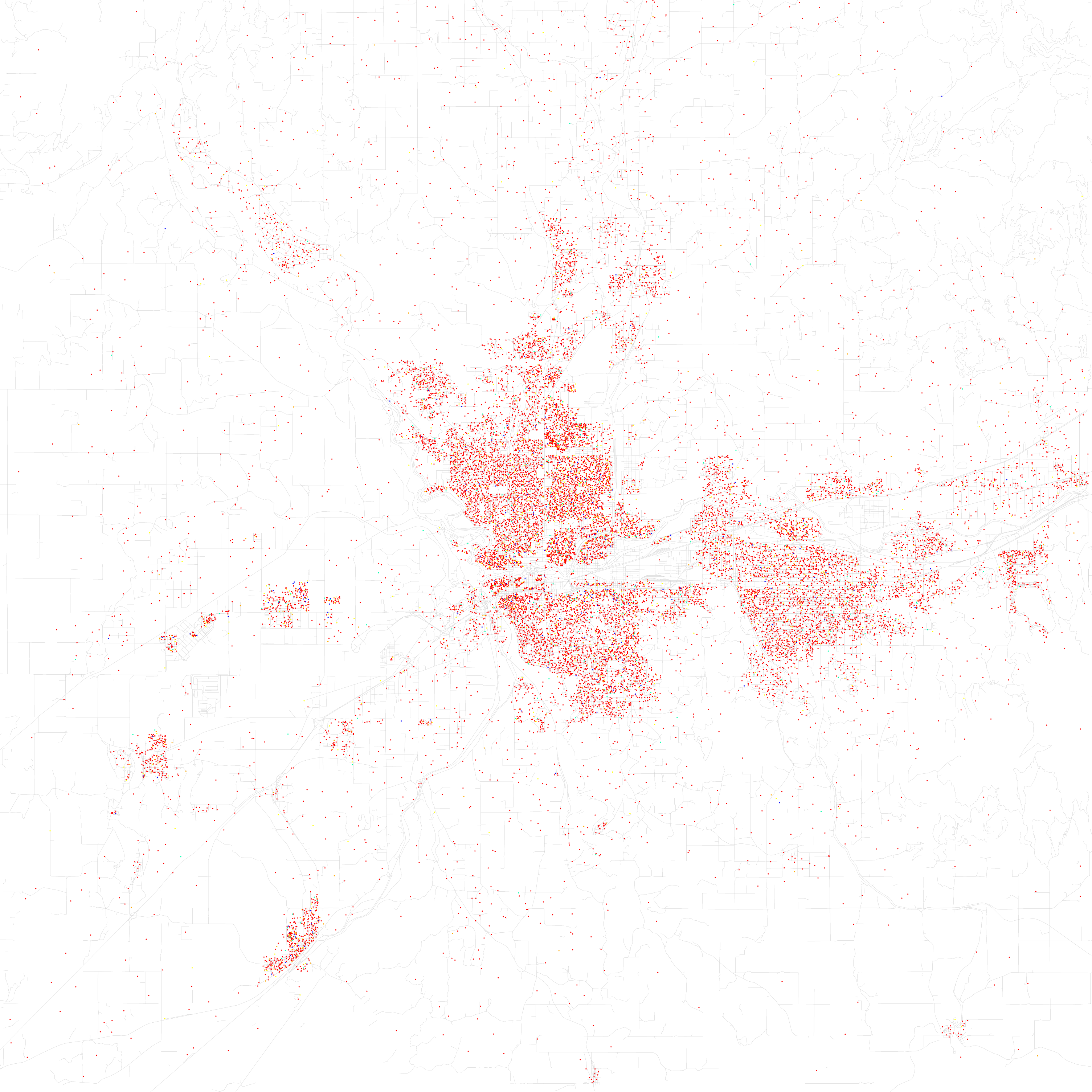
Demographic map of the Spokane metro area. Each dot is 25 people. ⬤ White ⬤ Black ⬤ Asian ⬤ Hispanic ⬤ Other

=== Metropolitan area ===
The Spokane metropolitan area consists of Spokane County. As of the 2022 census estimates, the Spokane metropolitan area had a population of 597,919. Directly east of Spokane County is the Coeur d'Alene Metropolitan Statistical Area, which consists of Kootenai County, Idaho, anchored by the city of Coeur d'Alene. The urban areas of the two MSAs largely follow the path of Interstate 90 between Spokane and Coeur d'Alene. The Spokane area has suffered from suburbanization and urban sprawl in past decades, despite Washington's use of urban growth boundaries; however Smart Growth America in a 2014 study ranked the census defined MSA as the 22nd most compact and connected in the nation using their Sprawl Index factors: development density, land use mix, activity centering, and street accessibility. The Spokane and Coeur d'Alene Metropolitan Statistical Areas (MSA) are now included in a single Combined Statistical Area (CSA) by the Office of Management and Budget. The Spokane–Coeur d'Alene CSA had around 781,497 residents in 2022.

== Economy ==
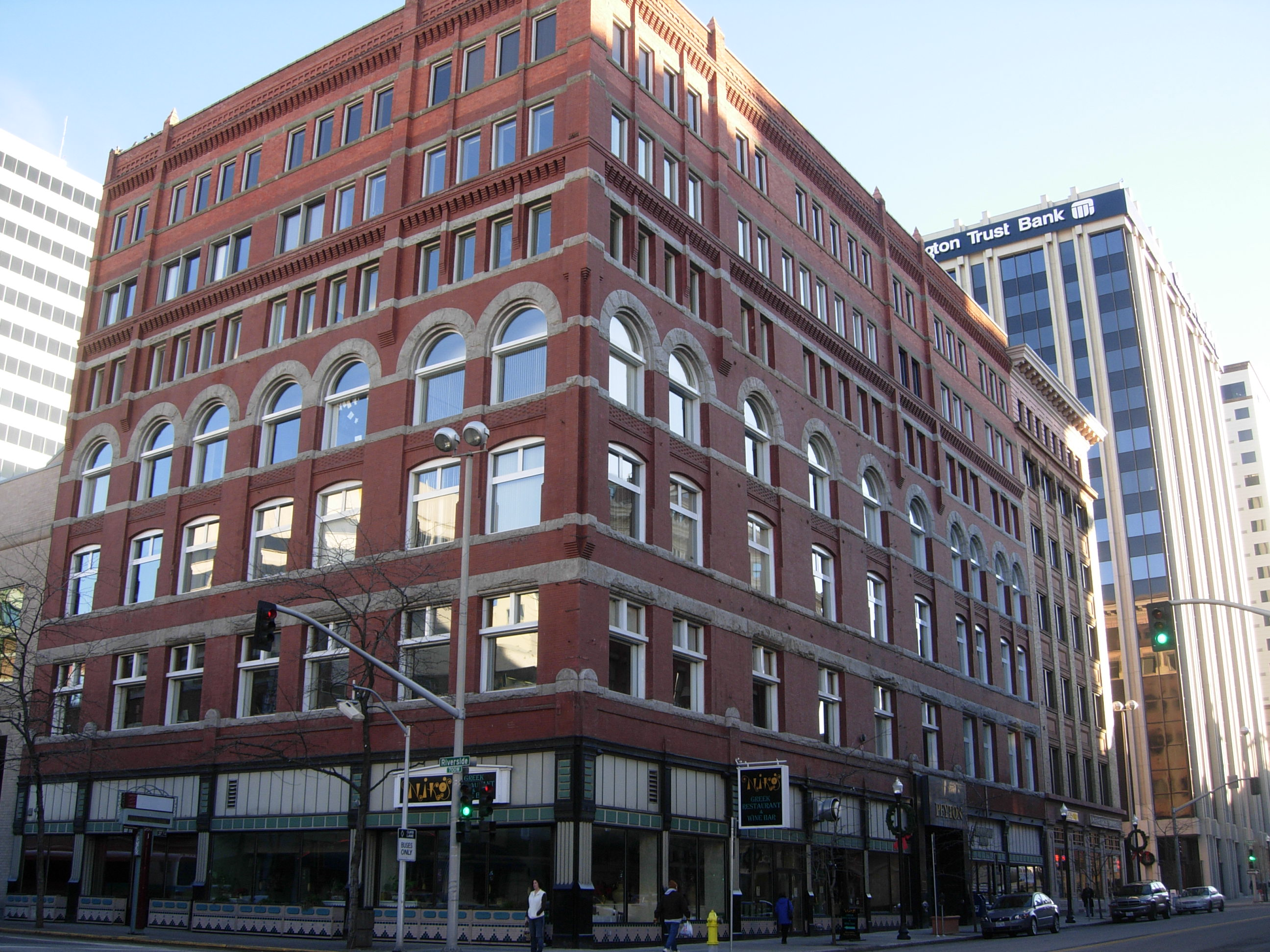
The Spokane Stock Exchange once occupied the Peyton Building

Spokane became an important rail and shipping center because of its location between mining and farming areas. In the early 1880s, gold and silver were discovered in the Inland Empire; as a regional shipping center, the city furnished supplies to the miners who passed through on their way to the mineral-rich Coeur d'Alene, Colville and Kootenay districts. The mining districts are still considered among the most productive in North America.

Natural resources have historically been the foundation of Spokane's economy, with the mining, logging, and agriculture industries providing much of the region's economic activity. After mining declined at the turn of the 20th century, agriculture and logging replaced mining as the primary influences in the economy. Lumberjacks and millmen working in the hundreds of mills along the railroads, rivers, and lakes of northern Washington and Idaho were provisioning themselves in Spokane. Agriculture has always been an important sector in the local economy. The surrounding area, especially to the south is the Palouse, a region that has long been associated with farming, especially wheat production where it is one of the largest wheat producing regions in the United States. As with the mining industry in the late 1880s, Spokane was an important agricultural market and trade center. Inland Empire farmers exported wheat, livestock and other agricultural products to the ports such as New York, Liverpool and Tokyo. Today, a large share of the wheat produced in the region is shipped to Far East markets. The Inland Northwest also supports many vineyards and microbreweries as well. By the early 20th century Spokane was primarily a commercial center rather than an industrial center.

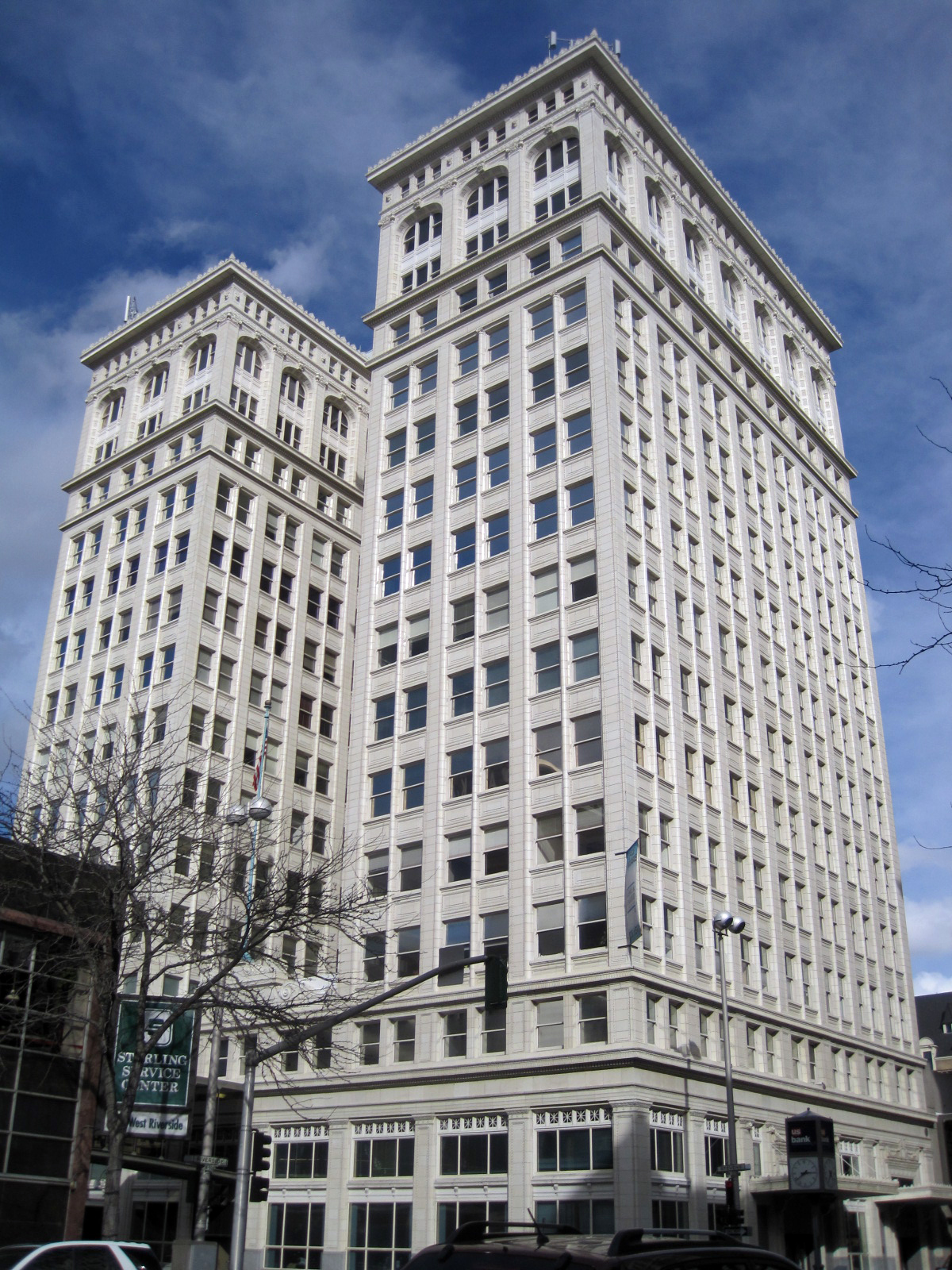
The Old National Bank Building

In Spokane, wood and food processing, printing and publishing, primary metal refining and fabrication, electrical and computer equipment, and transportation equipment are leaders in the manufacturing sector. Gold mining company Gold Reserve, and Fortune 1000 company Potlatch Corporation – a forest products company that operates as a real estate investment trust – are headquartered in the city proper. Mining, forestry, and agribusiness remain important to the local and regional economy, but Spokane's economy has diversified to include other industries, including the high-tech and biotech sectors. Spokane is becoming a more service-oriented economy in the face of a less prominent manufacturing sector which declined in the 1980s, particularly as a medical and biotechnology center; Fortune 1000 technology company Itron, for instance, is headquartered in the area. Avista Corporation, the holding company of Avista Utilities, is the only company in Spokane that has been listed in the Fortune 500, ranked 299 on the list in 2002. Other companies with head offices in the Spokane area include technology company Key Tronic, vacation rental provider Stay Alfred, and microcar maker Commuter Cars. Despite diversification to new industries, Spokane's economy has struggled in recent decades. Spokane was ranked the #1 "Worst City For Jobs" in America in both 2012 and 2015, while also ranking #4 in 2014. Additionally, Forbes named Spokane the "Scam Capital of America" in 2009 due to widespread business fraud. Trends of fraud were noted as far back as 1988, again in 2002, and continuing through 2011.

As of 2013, the top five employers in Spokane are the State of Washington, Spokane Public Schools, Providence Sacred Heart Medical Center and Children's Hospital, the 92d Air Refueling Wing, and Spokane County. The largest military facility and employer, the 92d Air Refueling Wing, was stationed at Fairchild Air Force Base near Airway Heights. The leading industries in Spokane for the employed population 16 years and older were educational services, health care, and social assistance (26.5 percent), retail trade (12.7 percent), and arts, entertainment, recreation, and accommodation food services (10.4 percent). As the metropolitan center of the Inland Northwest, as well as parts of southern British Columbia and Alberta, Spokane serves as a commercial, manufacturing, transportation, medical, shopping, and entertainment hub. In 2017, the Spokane–Spokane Valley MSA had a gross metropolitan product of $25.5 billion while the Coeur d'Alene metropolitan area was $5.93 billion.

As of 2014, economic development in the Spokane area primarily focuses on promoting the following industries: manufacturing (especially aerospace manufacturing), health sciences, professional services, information science and technology, finance and insurance as well as clean technology, and digital media. To aid economic development, the eastern branch of Innovate Washington, a state-supported business incubator was placed in the city.

In recent years, Spokane has become a growing technology hub for both established companies and startups. Fortune 1000 cybersecurity leader, F5, Inc., has two offices in the area with over 250 employees whom are focused on hardware product development, software engineering, global services support, and digital sales. Other established firms are moving to Spokane, such as Remitly, an app-based financial services corporation, which was founded by Josh Hug, a Whitworth University graduate. Ignite Northwest, led by Silicon Valley entrepreneur Tom Simpson, has invested over $100 million through the Spokane Angel Alliance and Ignite to fund and support early stage companies.

== Culture ==
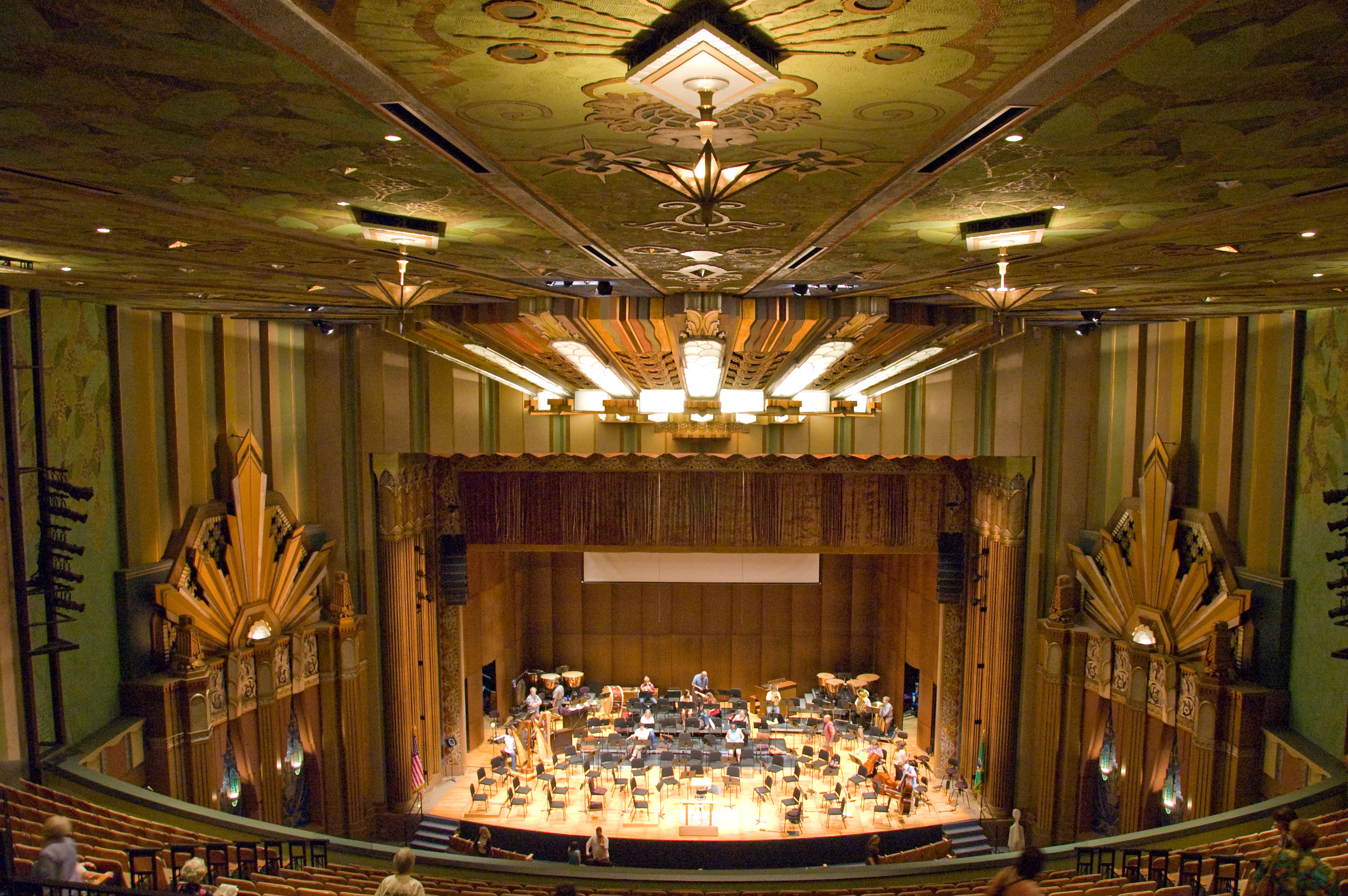
The art deco interior of the Fox Theater

=== Arts and theater ===
Spokane's main art districts are located in the Davenport Arts District, the Garland Business District, and East Sprague. The First Friday Artwalk, which occurs the first Friday of every month, is dedicated to local vendors and performers displaying art around downtown. The two most important Artwalk dates (the first Friday of February and October) attract large crowds to the art districts. The Davenport Arts District has the largest concentration of art galleries and is home to many of Spokane's main performing arts venues, including the Knitting Factory, Fox Theater, and Bing Crosby Theater. The Knitting Factory is a concert house that serves as a setting for many mainstream touring musicians and acts. The Martin Woldson Theater at the Fox, restored to its original 1931 Art Deco state after years of being derelict, is home to the Spokane Symphony Orchestra. The Metropolitan Performing Arts Center was restored in 1988 and renamed the Bing Crosby Theater in 2006 to honor the former Spokanite. Touring stand-up comedians are hosted by the Spokane Comedy Club. Theater is provided by Spokane's only resident professional company, The Modern Theater, though there are also the Spokane Civic Theatre and several other amateur community theaters and smaller groups. The First Interstate Center for the Arts often hosts large traveling exhibitions, shows, and tours. Spokane was awarded the All-America City Award by the National Civic League in 1974, 2004, and 2015.

Spokane offers an array of musical performances catering to a variety of interests. Spokane's local music scene, however, is considered somewhat lacking by the Spokane All-Ages Music Initiative and other critics, who have identified a need for a legitimate all-ages venue for music performances. The Spokane Symphony presents a full season of classical music, and the Spokane Jazz Orchestra, a full season of jazz music. The Spokane Jazz Orchestra, formed in 1962, is a 70-piece orchestra and non-profit organization.

=== Museums ===
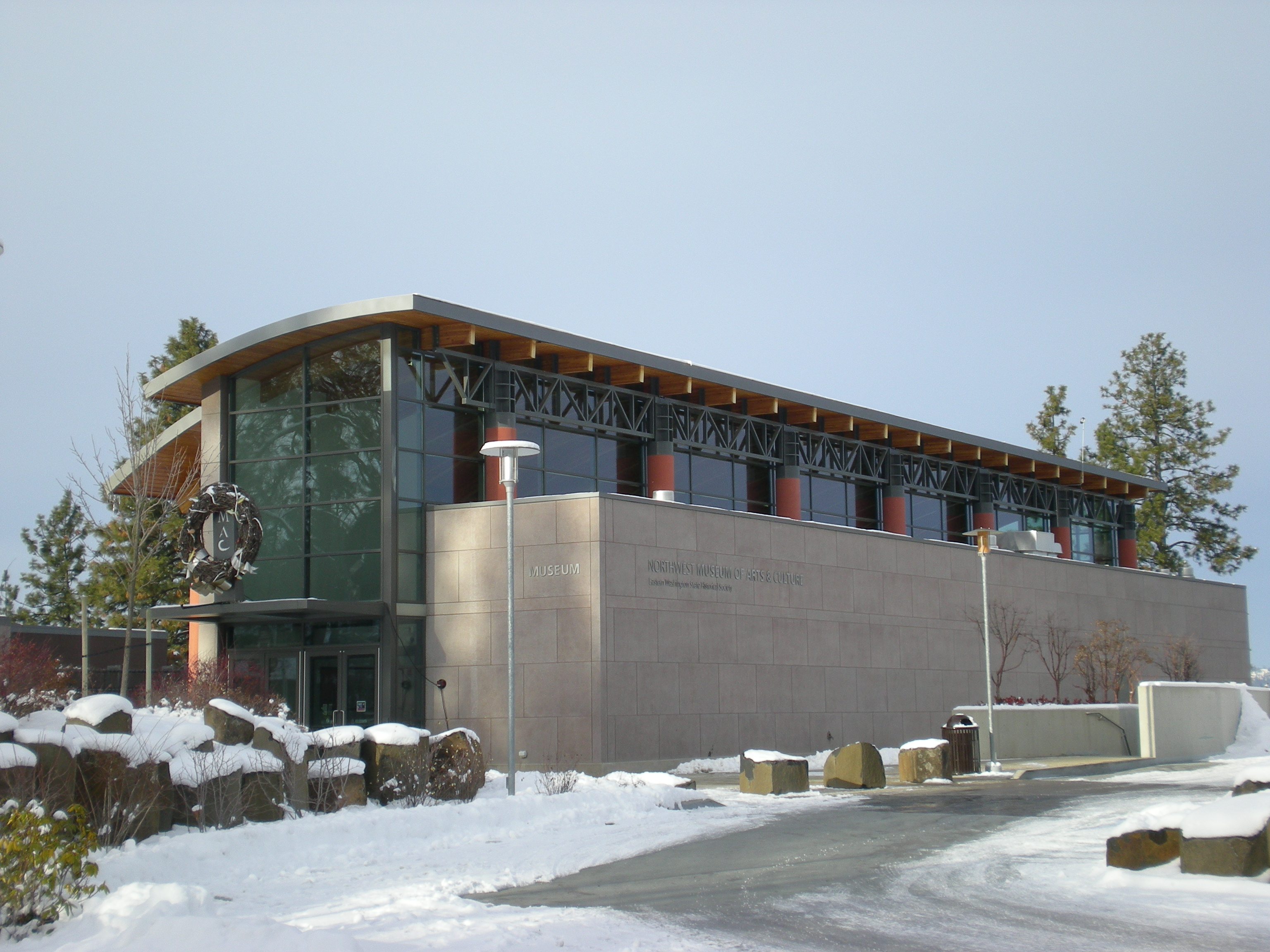
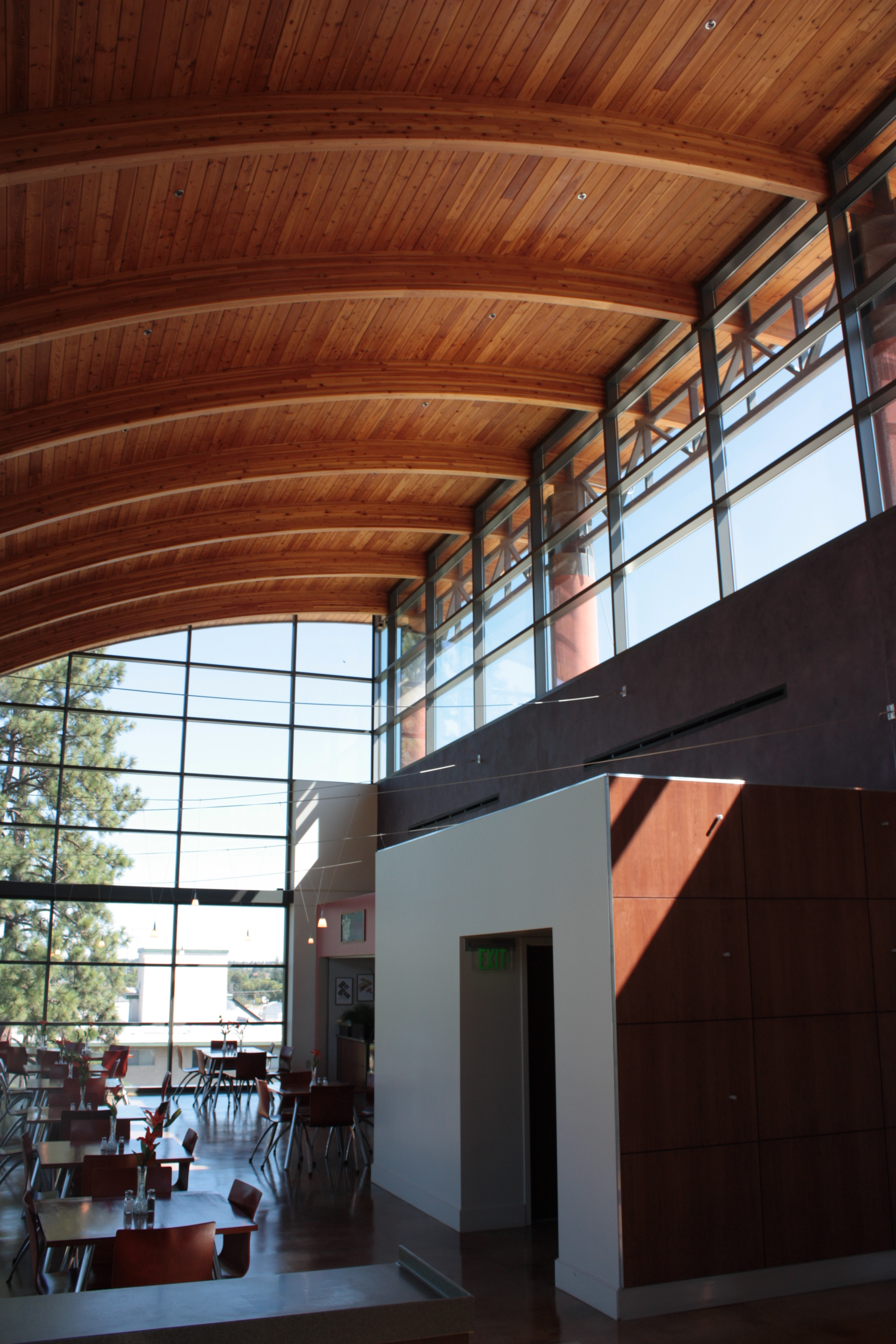
Northwest Museum of Arts in Culture

There are several museums in the city, most notably the Northwest Museum of Arts and Culture, located a few blocks from the center of downtown in Browne's Addition, amid the mansions of Spokane's late 19th-century "Age of Elegance". A Smithsonian affiliate museum, it houses a large collection of Native American artifacts as well as regional and national traveling art exhibits.

The Mobius Science Center and the related Mobius Kid's Museum in downtown Spokane seek to generate interest in science, technology, engineering, and math among the youth in a hands-on experience. The Jundt Art Museum at Gonzaga University features 2,800 square feet (260 m^{2}) of exhibition space and contains sizable collections of prints from the Bolker, Baruch, Jacobs, and Corita Kent collections. The museum houses glass art by Dale Chihuly, bronze sculptures by Auguste Rodin, tapestries, paintings, ceramics, photographs, and a wide range of gifts, including from the Iris and B. Gerald Cantor Foundation and Collections. On the campus of Gonzaga University, the Crosby House, Bing Crosby's childhood home, houses the Bing Crosby Memorabilia Room, the world's largest Crosby collection with around 200 pieces. A museum of flight showcasing historic airplanes and curated by the Historic Flight Foundation is located at Felts Field.

=== Events and activities ===
Spokane is known as the birthplace of the national movement started by Sonora Smart Dodd that led to the proposal and the eventual establishment of Father's Day as a national holiday in the U.S. The first observation of Father's Day in Spokane was on June 19, 1910. Sonora conceived the idea in Spokane's Central Methodist Episcopal Church, while listening to a Mother's Day sermon.

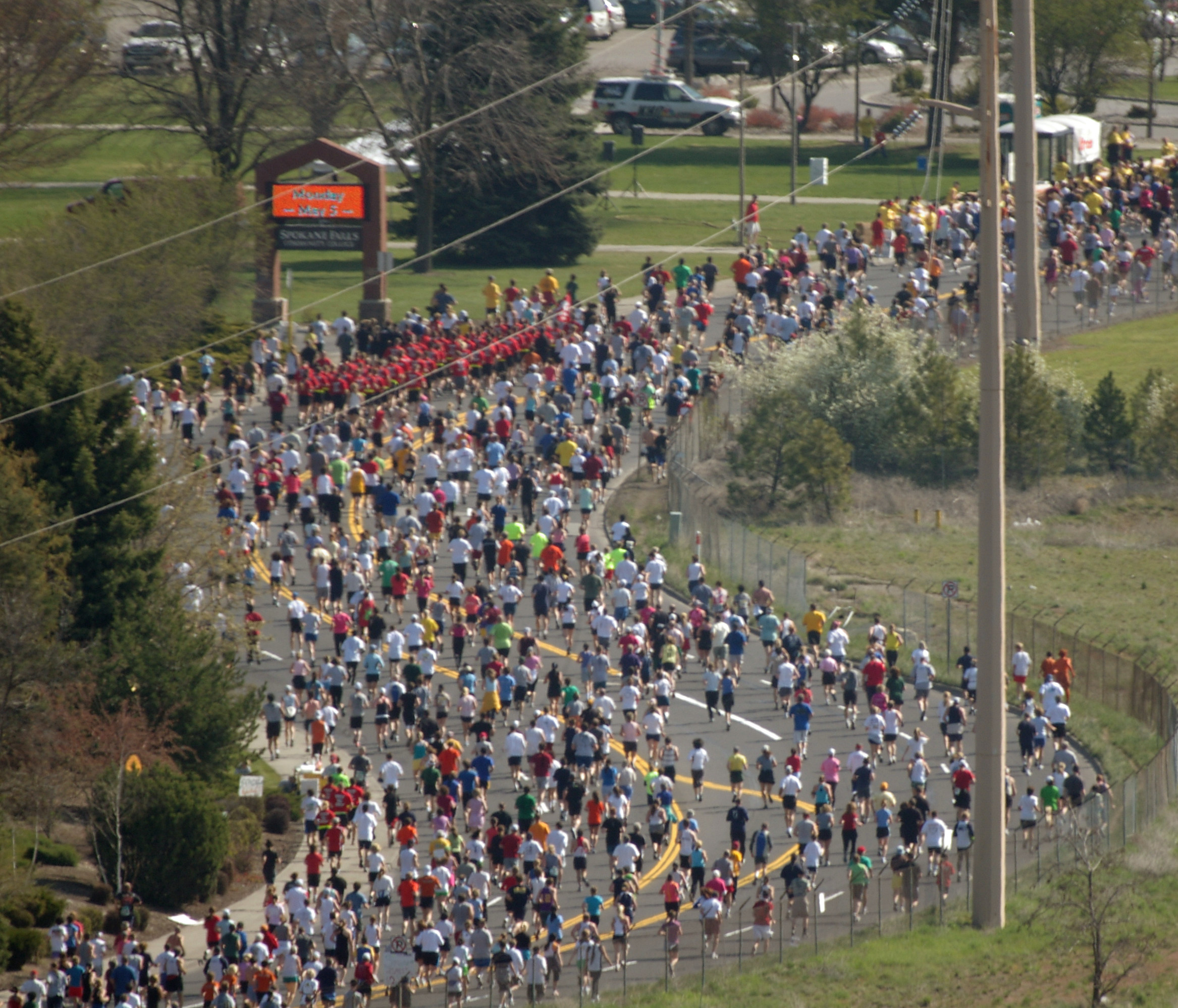
Lilac Bloomsday Run

The Lilac Bloomsday Run, held in the spring on the first Sunday of May, is a 7.46-mile (12.01 km) race for competitive runners as well as walkers that attracts international competition. Also in May is the Lilac Festival which honors the military, celebrates youth, and showcases the region. Spokane's unofficial nickname, the "Lilac City", refers to a flowering shrub that has flourished since its introduction to the area in the early 20th century. In June the city hosts Spokane Hoopfest, a 3-on-3 basketball tournament, among the largest of its kind. One of Spokane's most popular local events is Pig Out in the Park, an annual six-day food and entertainment festival where attendees may eat a variety of foods and listen to free live music concerts featuring local, regional, and national recording artists in Riverfront Park.

The Spokane International Film Festival, held every February, is a small, juried festival that features documentaries and shorts from around the world. The Spokane Gay & Lesbian Film Festival, held every November, features contemporary, independent films of interest to the LGBT community.

Other notable events in the Spokane region include the Spokane County Interstate Fair, Japan Week, Spokane Pride Parade and the Lilac City Comicon. The Spokane County Interstate Fair is held annually in September at the Spokane County Fair and Expo Center in Spokane Valley. Japan Week is held in April and celebrates the sister-city relationship with Nishinomiya, Hyogo, demonstrating the many commonalities shared between the two cities. Students from the Spokane campus of Mukogawa Fort Wright Institute, Gonzaga, Whitworth, and other area schools organize an array of Japanese cultural events. The gay and lesbian Spokane Pride Parade is held each June. There is an annual Renaissance fair and Civil War reenactment as well.

== Government and politics ==
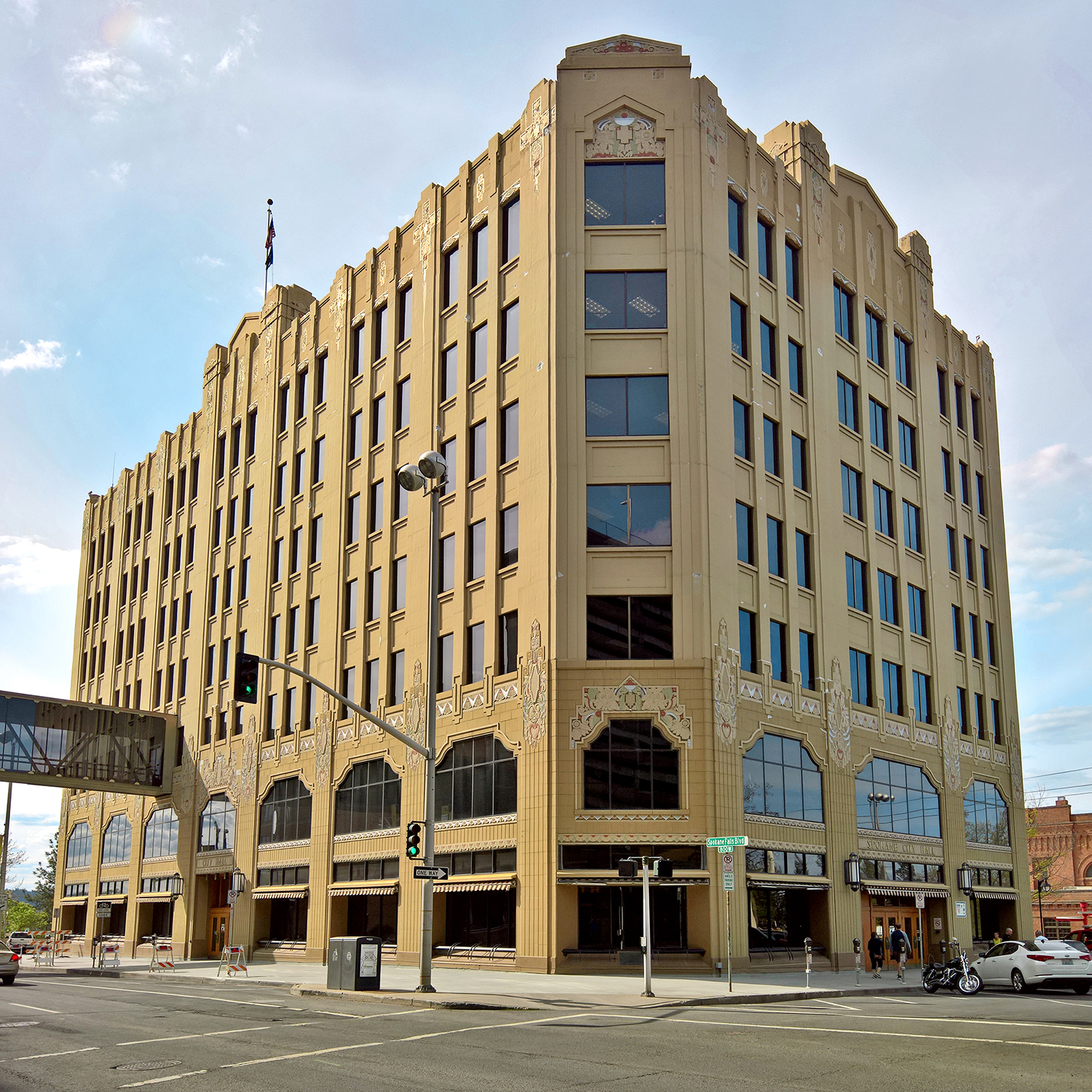
Spokane City Hall

The City of Spokane operates under a mayor–council form of government, with executive and legislative branches that are elected in non-partisan elections. David Condon was elected mayor in November 2011 and took office on the last business day of the year. The previous mayor was Mary Verner, who succeeded Dennis P. Hession who himself succeeded the recalled James "Jim" West. The city elected James Everett Chase as its first African-American mayor in 1981, and after his retirement, elected the city's first woman mayor, Vicki McNeil. Spokane is the county seat of Spokane County, a position it wrested from Cheney in 1886. Spokane is a part of Washington's 3rd legislative district, which is represented in the Washington State Senate by Andy Billig. The 3rd Legislative District is represented in the Washington House of Representatives by Marcus Riccelli and Timm Ormsby.

Federally, Spokane is within Washington's 5th congressional district, and has been represented in the House of Representatives by Republican Michael Baumgartner since 2025. Washington State is represented nationally in the Senate by Democrat Patty Murray and Democrat Maria Cantwell. In the 2012 general election, Spokane County favored Mitt Romney for president over Barack Obama by 51.5 to 45.7 percent; on the state ballot, the county supported the legalization of recreational marijuana ballot measure by 52.2 to 47.9 percent but opposed the legalization of same-sex marriage by 55.9 to 44.1 percent. Spokane native Tom Foley was a Democratic Speaker of the House and served as a representative of Washington's 5th district for 30 years, enjoying large support from Spokane, until his narrow defeat in the "Republican Revolution" of 1994, the only time U.S. voters have turned out a sitting Speaker of the House since 1860.

=== Crime ===
Spokane
- Crime rates* (2022)

Violent crimes
- Homicide: 18
- Rape: 194
- Robbery: 309
- Aggravated assault: 1,039
- Total violent crime: 1,560

Property crimes
- Burglary: 1,786
- Larceny-theft: 9,987
- Motor vehicle theft: 1,843
- Arson: 75
- Total property crime: 13,691
- Note: Reported crimes per 100,000 population Source: 2022 FBI UCR Data

The crime rate per 1,000 people in the Spokane metropolitan area (Spokane County) was 64.8 in 2012, higher than the Washington state average of 38.3; the violent crime rate of 3.8 and property crime rate of 61 also exceed the statewide averages of 2.5 and 35.8, respectively. NeighborhoodScout describes Spokane as "Safer than 2% of U.S. Cities".

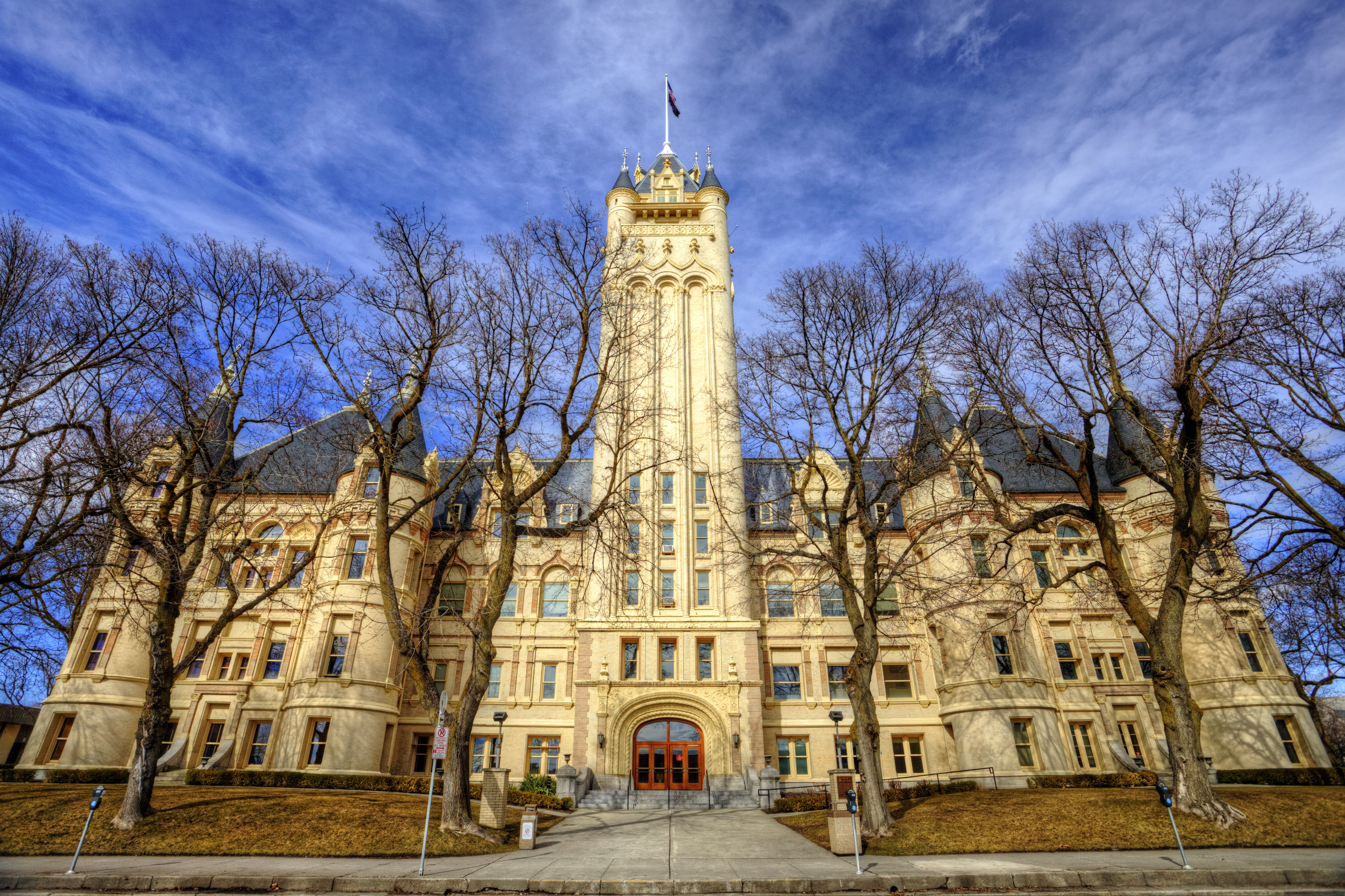
Spokane County Courthouse

Half of all property crimes are localized in about 6.5 percent of the city. Spokane had the fourth-highest rate of auto theft in the U.S. in 2010 and 2011, according to the National Insurance Crime Bureau. Drive-by shootings and drug use, particularly crack cocaine use, became worse in the early 1990s, and four drive-by shootings were recorded in December 1993 alone. In the 1990s, the Spokane Police Department (SPD) established a special gang unit, with an officer "collecting intelligence on gang activity and disseminating it to street officers". The 1990s also saw Spokane's most prolific serial killer, Robert Lee Yates, who killed thirteen prostitutes in Spokane's East Sprague red light district and confessed to two others in Tacoma, Washington. The transition of the Spokane Police Department to a community-policing precinct model has helped curb crime rates since its introduction downtown, and has been expanded citywide. The crime woes are possibly due in part to an imbalance that Spokane County prisons receive of pre-release and work-release prisoners; An investigation by the Tacoma News Tribune found that while Spokane County accounts for 6.21 percent of the inmates in state prisons, it receives a disproportionate 16.73 percent of the inmate population to be released into the general population.

Spokane and the Spokane Police Department have received national publicity and scrutiny in the 2000s and 2010s due to many officer-involved shootings and allegations of excessive force. The most high-profile of these incidents was the 2006 death of Otto Zehm, a mentally challenged man who was initially suspected of theft at a convenience store. Zehm was later found to have committed no crime, but was struck with batons by several officers and tasered. The increased pressure on the SPD prompted an independent review by a commission of the organization's use-of-force policies, an internal culture audit, and the purchase of body cameras.

=== Housing ===
Restrictive zoning regulations were implemented in Spokane in the middle of the 20th century. These zoning regulations were frequently motivated by a desire to keep lower-income families out of certain neighborhoods, in particular racial minorities.

In 2022, Spokane relaxed its zoning regulations to permit on an interim basis duplexes, triplexes, quadplexes and townhomes in all residential zones of Spokane. In 2023, Spokane permanently permitted up to six housing units to be built on any lot in a residential area, as well as allow nonresidential businesses (such as grocery stores) and facilities (such as schools and churches) in residential areas.

== Education ==
=== Public and private schools ===
Spokane Public Schools (District 81) was organized in 1889, and is the largest public school system in Spokane, and the second-largest in the state, as of 2014, serving roughly 30,000 students in six high schools, six middle schools, and thirty-four elementary schools. Other public school districts in the Spokane area include the Mead School District in north Spokane County, outside city limits. A variety of state-approved, independent charter schools and private and parochial elementary and secondary schools augment the public school system. The Roman Catholic Diocese of Spokane manages ten such schools in & around the area.

=== Higher education ===
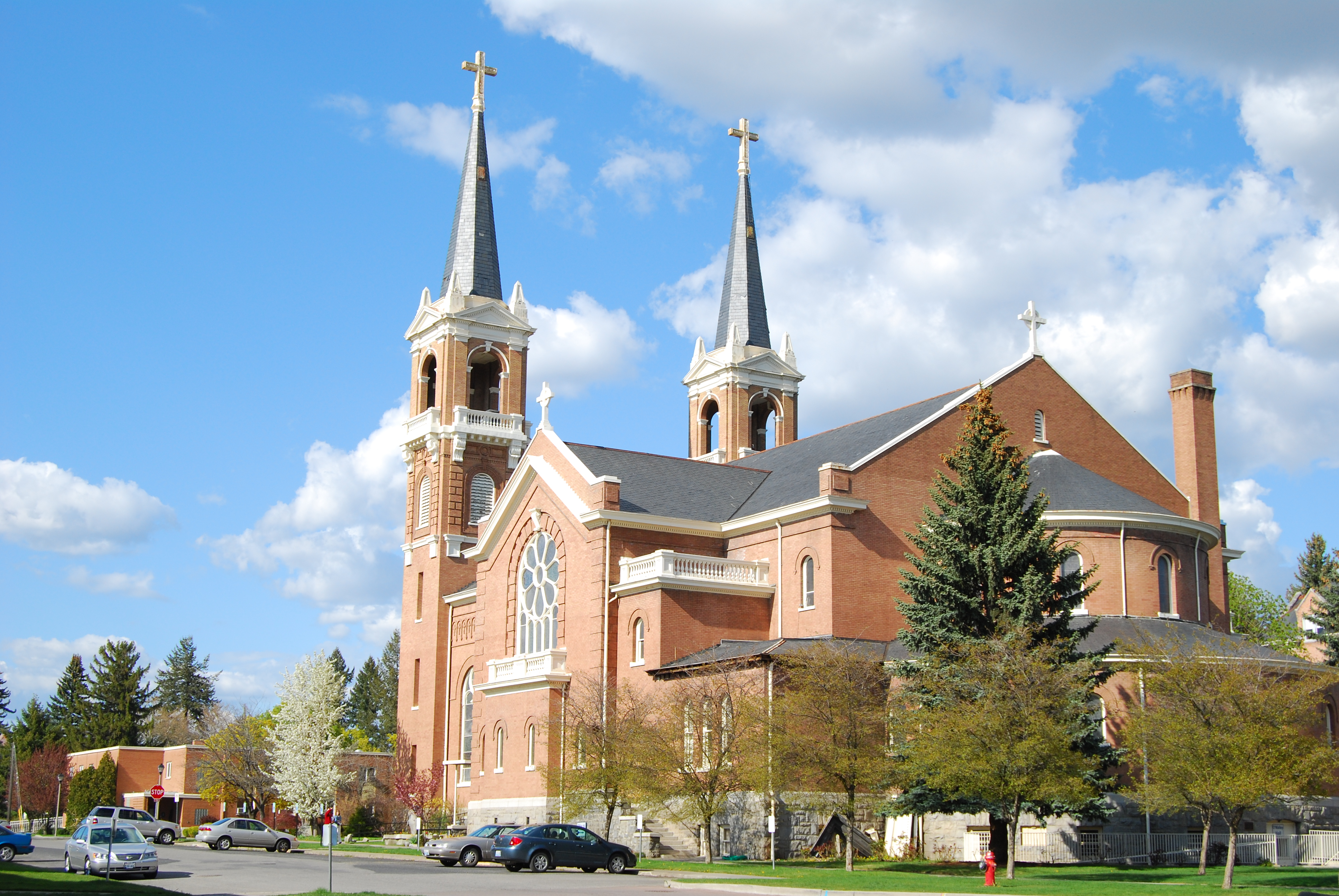
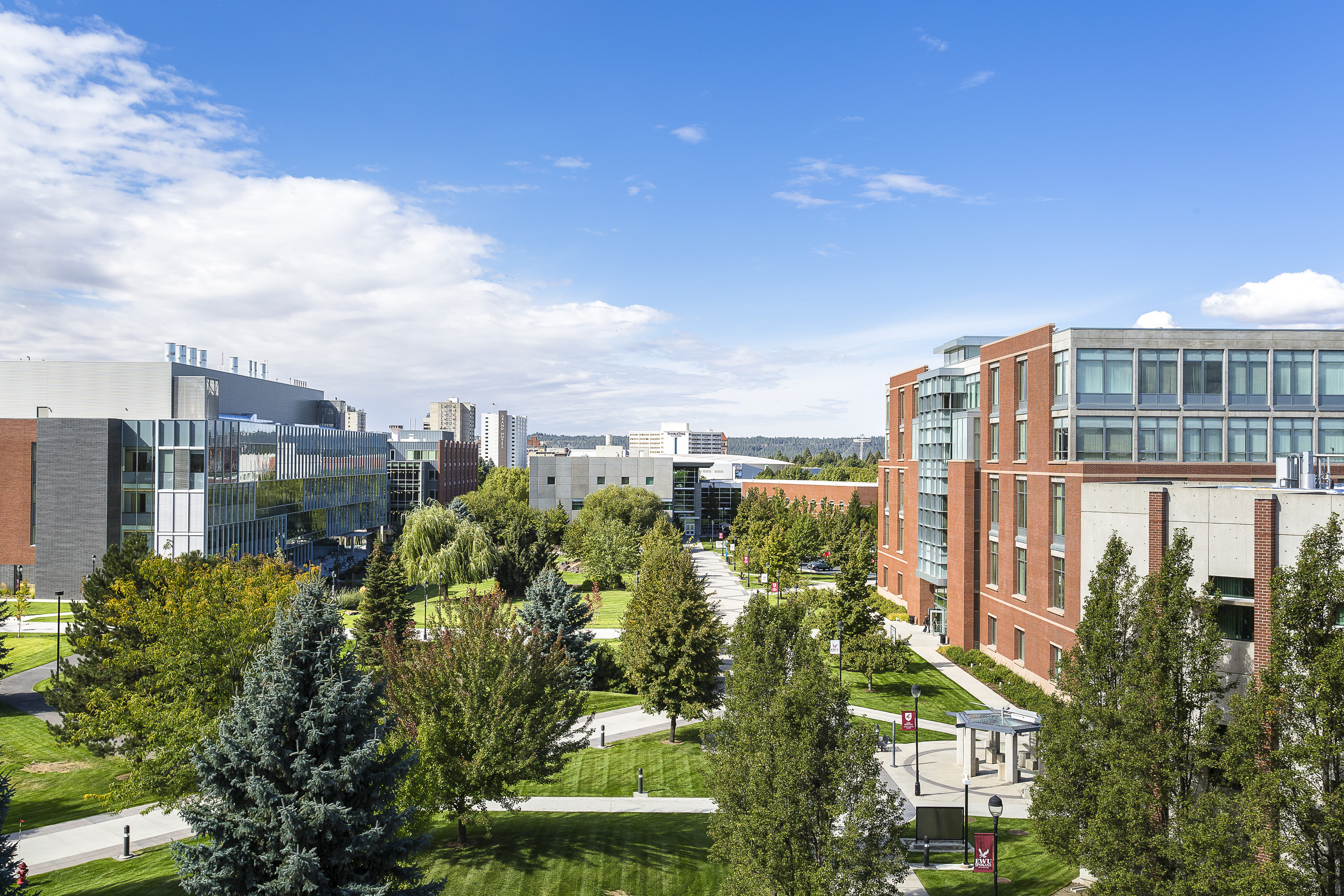
St. Aloysius Church at Gonzaga University and the WSU Health Sciences Spokane campus, located in the University District

Spokane is home to many higher education institutions. They include the private universities Gonzaga and Whitworth, and the public Community Colleges of Spokane system (Spokane Community College and Spokane Falls Community College) as well as a variety of technical institutes. Gonzaga University and Law School were founded by the Italian-born priest Joseph Cataldo and the Jesuits in 1887. Whitworth was founded in Tacoma, Washington in 1890 and moved to its present location in 1914. It is affiliated with the Presbyterian Church and had 2,500 students studying in 53 different undergraduate and degree programs as of 2011. While Spokane is one of the larger cities in the U.S. to lack a main campus of a state-supported university within its city limits, Eastern Washington University (EWU) and Washington State University (WSU) have operations at the Riverpoint Campus in the University District, just adjacent to downtown and across the Spokane River from the Gonzaga campus. Washington State University Spokane is WSU's health sciences campus and houses the school's College of Nursing, College of Pharmacy, and Elson S. Floyd College of Medicine. The main EWU campus is located 15 miles (24 km) southwest of Spokane in nearby Cheney, and WSU is located 65 miles (105 km) to the south in Pullman. In addition to WSU's health science presence in Spokane, there is also a four-year medical school branch affiliated with the University of Washington's WWAMI program. An international branch campus of the Mukogawa Women's University, the Mukogawa Fort Wright Institute, is located in Spokane.

=== Libraries ===
Serving the general educational needs of the local population are two public library districts, the Spokane Public Library (within city limits) and the Spokane County Library District. Founded in 1904 with funding from philanthropist Andrew Carnegie, the Spokane Public Library system comprises a downtown library overlooking the Spokane Falls and five branch libraries. Special collections focus on Inland Pacific Northwest history and include reference books, periodicals, maps, photographs, and other archival materials and government documents.

== Sports ==
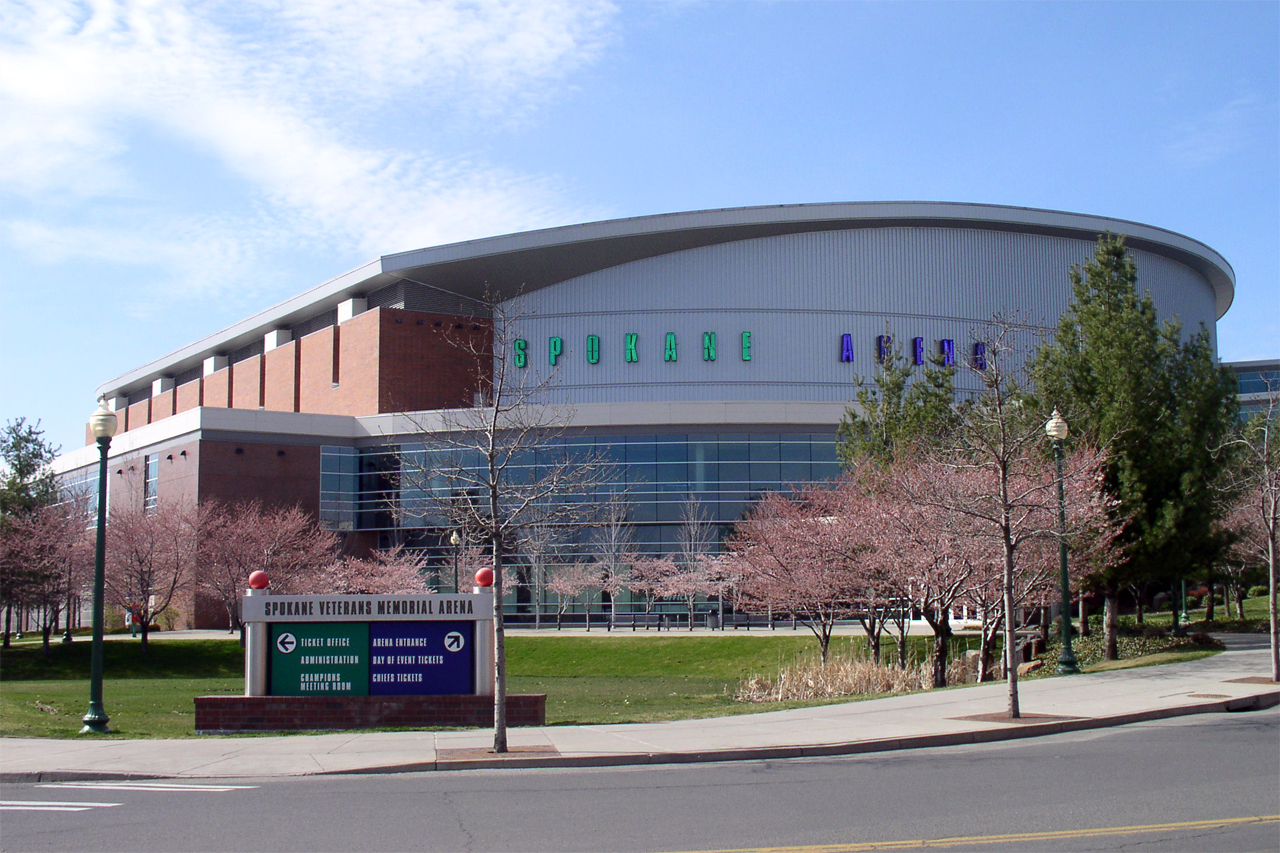
Numerica Veterans Arena

Spokane is close to dozens of lakes and rivers for outdoor sports and recreation. People use these for swimming, boating, kayaking, rafting, and fishing. Nearby mountains provide for skiing, hiking, biking and sightseeing. The Spokane region's professional and semi-professional sports teams include the Spokane Indians in Minor League Baseball and the Spokane Chiefs in junior ice hockey. Collegiate sports in Spokane focus on the local teams such as the Gonzaga Bulldogs who compete in the NCAA's Division I West Coast Conference and the Whitworth Pirates playing in the Division III Northwest Conference and local media covers other regional teams, including the Eastern Washington Eagles, Washington State Cougars, and the Idaho Vandals.

=== Baseball ===
The Spokane Indians located in the suburb Spokane Valley, are a Class High-A baseball team in the Northwest League (NWL) and have been a farm team of the Colorado Rockies since 2021. The Indians play their home games at the 6,803-seat Avista Stadium and have won seven NWL titles since their Short-Season-A debut in 1982. Prior to 1982, the Indians played at the Triple-A level. The team achieved considerable success in the early 1970s, winning the Pacific Coast League championship in 1970, and having a 94–52 record. In the 1920s and 1930s the Spokane City League, a semiprofessional baseball league of teams of the Inland Empire, reached its peak.

=== Hockey ===
The Spokane Chiefs are a junior ice hockey team that play in the Canadian Hockey League's Western Hockey League. They play their home games in the Spokane Arena and have a regional rivalry with the Tri-City Americans. They have won the CHL's top prize, the Memorial Cup, two times in club history, first in 1991 and again in 2008.

=== Soccer ===
Spokane is host to United Soccer League professional men's USL League One (Spokane Velocity FC), a women's pre-professional USL W League team, as well as a women's professional USL Super League team (Spokane Zephyr FC). They play their home games in ONE Spokane Stadium.

=== Major events ===
The Spokane Arena is the city's premier sports venue. In the years since the Spokane Arena opened, it has played host to several major sporting events. The first major event was the 1998 Memorial Cup, the championship game of the Canadian Hockey League. Four years later in 2002, the city hosted the 2002 Skate America figure skating competition and then the 2007 U.S. Figure Skating Championships in the Spokane Arena. The latter event set an attendance record, selling nearly 155,000 tickets. Spokane later hosted the 2010 U.S. Figure Skating Championships – ending eighteen days before the start of the 2010 Winter Olympics in Vancouver, British Columbia and then the 2016 Team Challenge Cup. Spokane is also home to The Podium indoor hydraulic track and event space, and multi-use One Spokane Stadium.

== Media ==
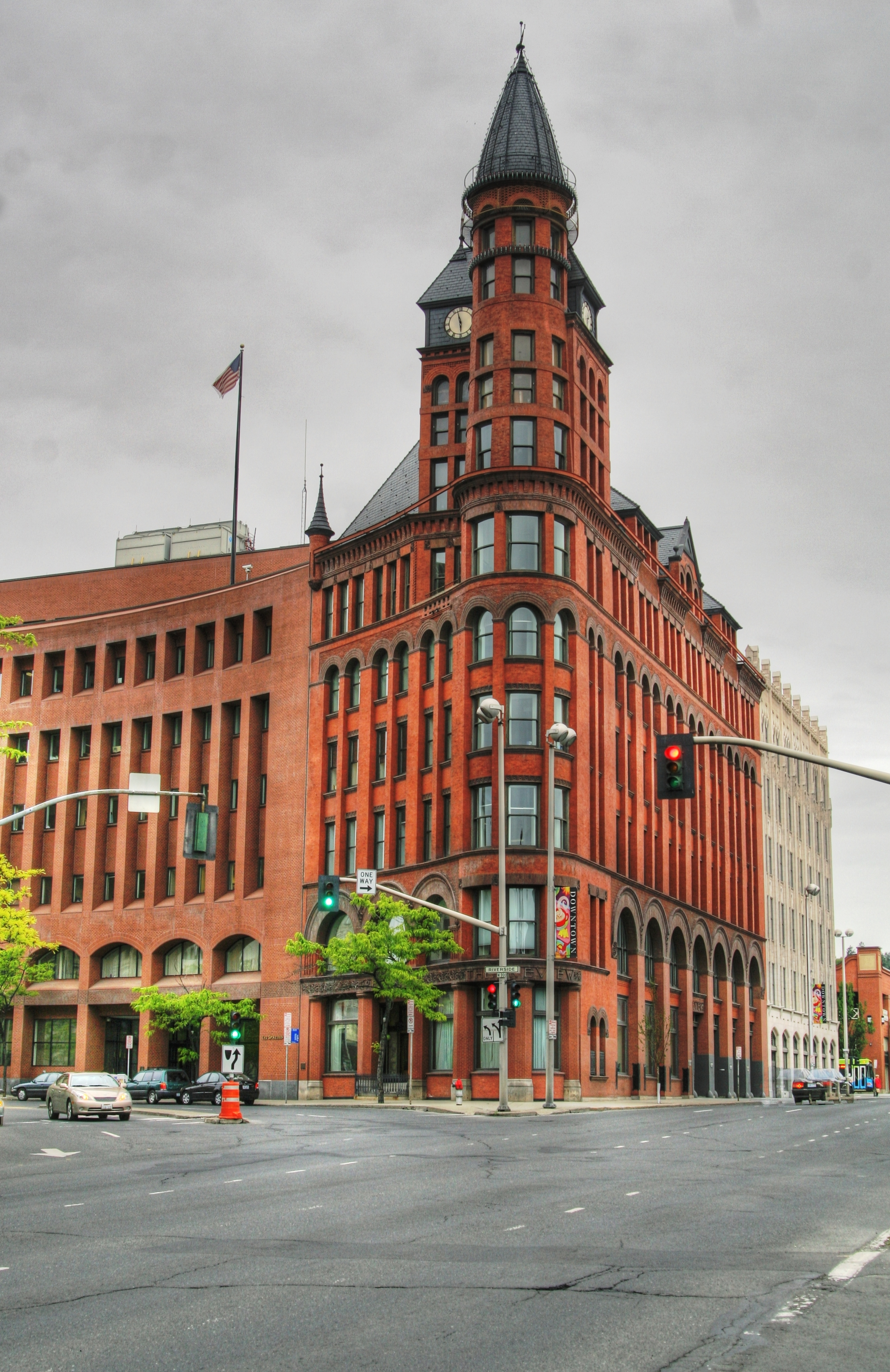
The Review Building

=== Print ===
Newspaper service in Spokane is provided by its only major daily newspaper, The Spokesman-Review, which has a daily circulation of 76,291 and Sunday circulation of 95,939. The Spokesman-Review was formed from the merger of the Spokane Falls Review (1883–1894) and the Spokesman (1890–1893) in 1893 and was first published under the present name on June 29, 1894. It later absorbed the competing afternoon paper The Spokane Daily Chronicle, a significant newspaper that existed from 1881 until 1982 and returned in 2021.^{[j]} More specialized publications include the weekly alternative newspaper Inlander, the bi-weekly Spokane Journal of Business, and the student-run Gonzaga Bulletin. Monthly publications include The Black Lens, an African American community newspaper, a newspaper for parents, Kids Newspaper, and a home and lifestyle magazine, Spokane Coeur d'Alene Living.

=== Radio ===
According to Arbitron, Spokane is the 94th-largest radio market in the U.S., with 532,100 listeners aged 12 and over. There are 28 AM and FM radio stations broadcast in the city. The five most listened-to stations are KKZX-FM (classic rock), KQNT-AM (news/talk), KXLY-FM (country), KISC-FM (adult contemporary),KZBD-FM (Contemporary Hit Radio), and KZZU-FM (Hot AC). Spokane's primary sources of non-commercial and community radio include Spokane's NPR-affiliate station KPBX-FM and KYRS, a full-power community radio station.

=== Television ===
Spokane is the 73rd-largest television market in the U.S., accounting for 0.366% of the total TV households in the U.S. The city has six television stations, representing the major commercial networks and public television. Spokane is the television broadcast center for much of eastern Washington (except the Yakima and Tri-Cities area), northern Idaho, northwestern Montana, northeastern Oregon, and parts of southern Canada (by cable television). Spokane receives broadcasts in the Pacific Time Zone, with weekday prime time beginning at 8 pm. Montana and Alberta, Canada are in the Mountain Time Zone and receive Spokane broadcasts one hour later by their local time. The major network television affiliates include KREM (TV) 2 (CBS), KXLY-TV 4 (ABC), KHQ-TV 6 (NBC; Spokane's first television station, on air on December 20, 1952), KAYU 28 (FOX), KSKN 22 (The CW), KSPS-TV 7 (PBS), and KCDT-TV 26 (PBS; operating out of Coeur d'Alene, Idaho).

== Infrastructure ==
Street layout of Spokane city center

=== Transportation ===
==== City streets ====
Spokane's streets use a grid plan that is oriented to the four cardinal directions; generally, the east–west roads are designated as avenues, and the north–south roads are referred to as streets. Major east–west thoroughfares in the city include Francis, Wellesley, Mission, Sprague, and 29th avenues. Major north–south thoroughfares include Maple–Ash, Monroe, Division, Hamilton, Greene–Market (north of I-90), and Ray–Freya (south of I-90) Streets. Division Street divides the city into East and West, while Sprague Avenue splits the city into North and South. Division Street is Spokane's major retail corridor; Sprague Avenue serves the same purpose in Spokane Valley. With over 40,000 vehicles per day in average daily traffic from I-90 north to the intersection of US 2/US 395, North Division is Spokane's busiest corridor.

Spokane's extensive skywalk system covers thirteen blocks in the downtown area and is among the largest in the United States; it is used for pedestrian travel in cold and inclement weather and retail space as well. Despite this, the city has an average Walk Score of 49 as of 2020, indicating that most errands require a car. Its average Bike Score is 52.

==== Mass transportation ====
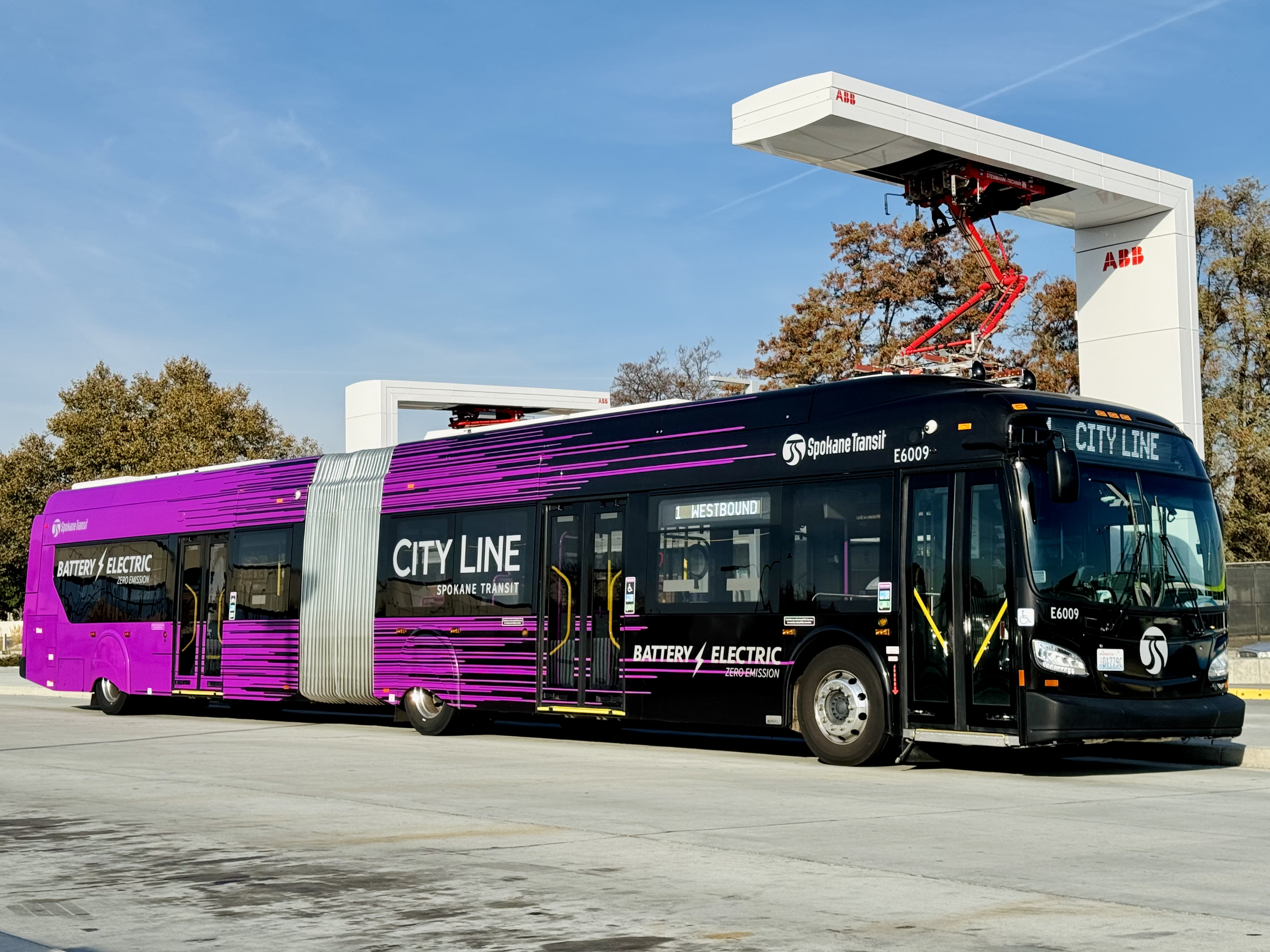
STA City Line battery electric bus charging at Spokane Community College

Before the influx of automobiles, Spokane's electric streetcar and interurban lines played a dominant role in moving people and goods around Spokane. Streetcars were installed as early as 1888, when they were pulled by horses. Many older side streets in Spokane still have visible streetcar rails embedded in them. Streetcar service was reduced due to declining ridership beginning in 1922, and by August 1936, all lines had been abandoned or converted to motor buses.

Spokane has intercity rail and bus service provided by Amtrak, Greyhound, Flixbus and Jefferson Lines via the Spokane Intermodal Center. The city is a stop for Amtrak's Empire Builder on its way to and from Chicago's Union Station en route to Seattle and Portland. Amtrak's through service to Seattle and Portland is a legacy of BNSF Railway's old Spokane, Portland and Seattle Railway trackage. Spokane is a major railway junction for the BNSF Railway and the Union Pacific Railroad and is the western terminus for the Montana Rail Link.

Public transportation throughout the Spokane area is provided by the Spokane Transit Authority (STA), which operates a fleet of 164 buses. Its service area covers roughly 248 square miles (640 km^{2}) and reaches 85 percent of the county's population. The STA Plaza in downtown Spokane acts as the regional hub for most STA routes. As a part of the system's high performance transit network plan, STA introduced Eastern Washington's first bus rapid transit (BRT) route, City Line, in July 2023. STA is also planning a Division Street BRT line from downtown Spokane to Mead that is scheduled to open by 2030.

==== Freeways and highways ====
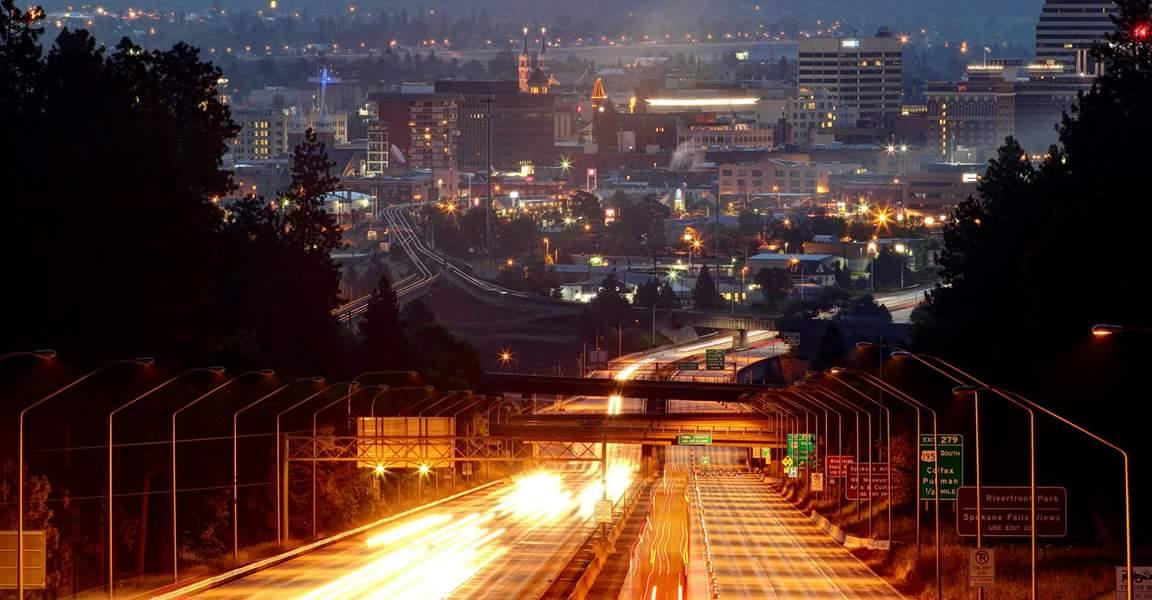
Overlooking Spokane and Interstate 90 from Sunset Hill

I-90 runs east–west from Seattle, through downtown Spokane, and eastward through Spokane Valley, Liberty Lake, and onward to Coeur d'Alene and then Missoula. Although they are not limited access highways like I-90, US 2 and US 395 enter Spokane from the west via I-90 and continue north through Spokane via Division Street. The two highways share the same route until they reach "The Y", a fork where US 395 continues northward to Deer Park, Colville then onward to Canada, and US 2 branches off to the northeast, continuing to Mead, Newport, and Sandpoint. US 195, also known as the Inland Empire Highway, connects to Interstate 90 west of Spokane near Latah Creek and travels south through the Palouse.

The Washington State Department of Transportation is tasked with improving local highways to keep up with the region's growth and to try to prevent congestion problems that plague many larger cities. The WSDOT is constructing the North Spokane Corridor. When completed, the corridor will be a 10.5-mile-long (16.9 km) limited-access highway that will run from I-90, in the vicinity of the Thor/Freya interchange, northward through Spokane, meeting the existing US 395 just south of the Wandermere Golf Course.

==== Airports ====
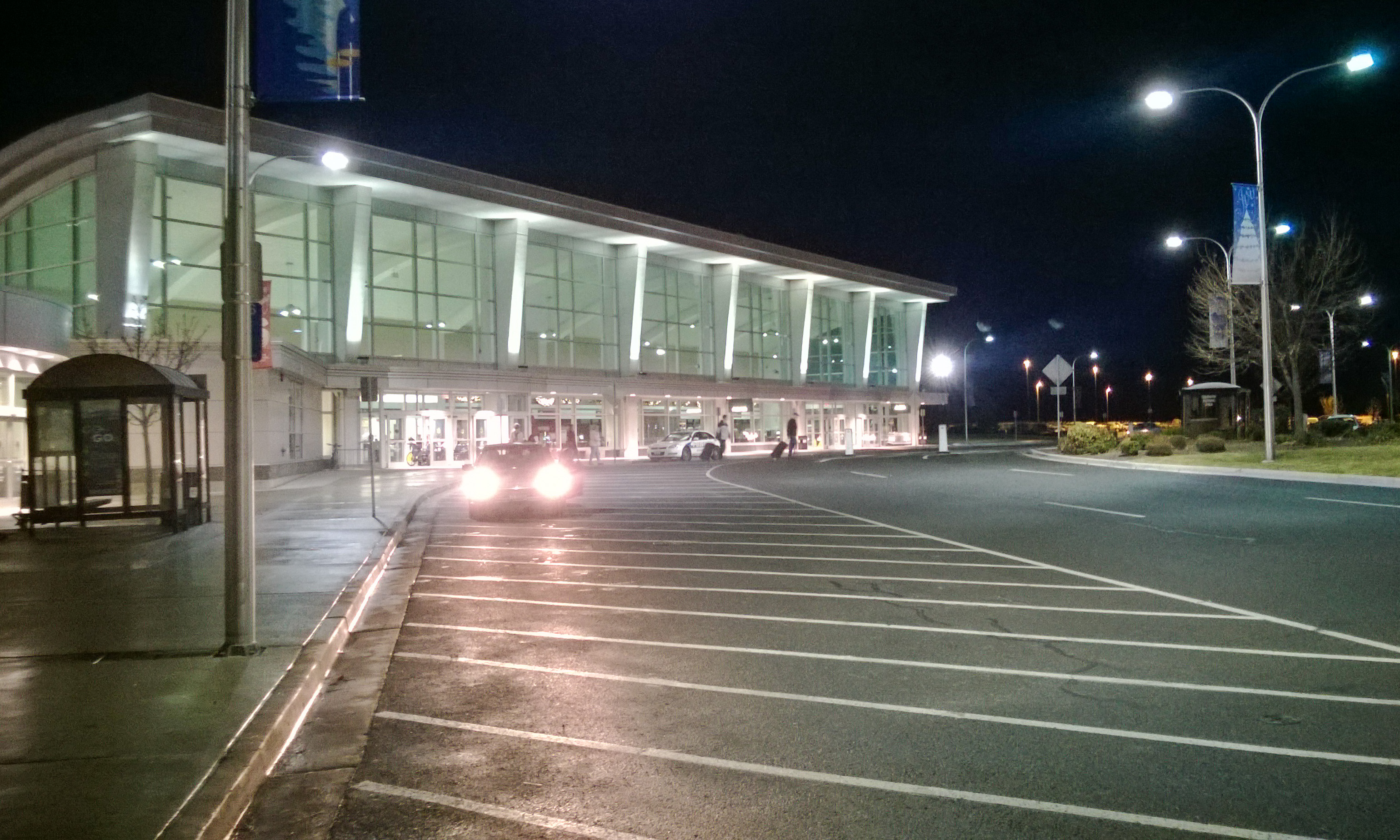
Concourse C, Spokane International Airport

Spokane International Airport (IATA: GEG, ICAO: KGEG) serves as the primary commercial airport for Spokane, Eastern Washington, and Northern Idaho. It is the second-largest airport in the state of Washington, and is recognized by the Federal Aviation Administration as a small hub, with service from nine passenger and five cargo airlines. The 6,140-acre (24.85 km^{2}) airport is located 5 miles (8.0 km) west of downtown Spokane and is approximately a 10-minute drive away. The international airport's three-letter designation is "GEG", a result and legacy of the Geiger Field days prior to 1960, when the airport was named after Army aviator Major Harold Geiger in 1941.

Felts Field is a general aviation airport serving the Spokane area and is located in east Spokane along the south bank of the Spokane River. Aviation at Felts Field dates back to 1913 and the strip served as Spokane's primary airport until commercial air traffic was redirected to Geiger Field after World War II. In 1927, the strip was one of the first in the western U.S. to receive official recognition as an airport by the U.S. Department of Commerce and is now named in honor of James Buell Felts, a Washington Air National Guard pilot.

=== Healthcare ===
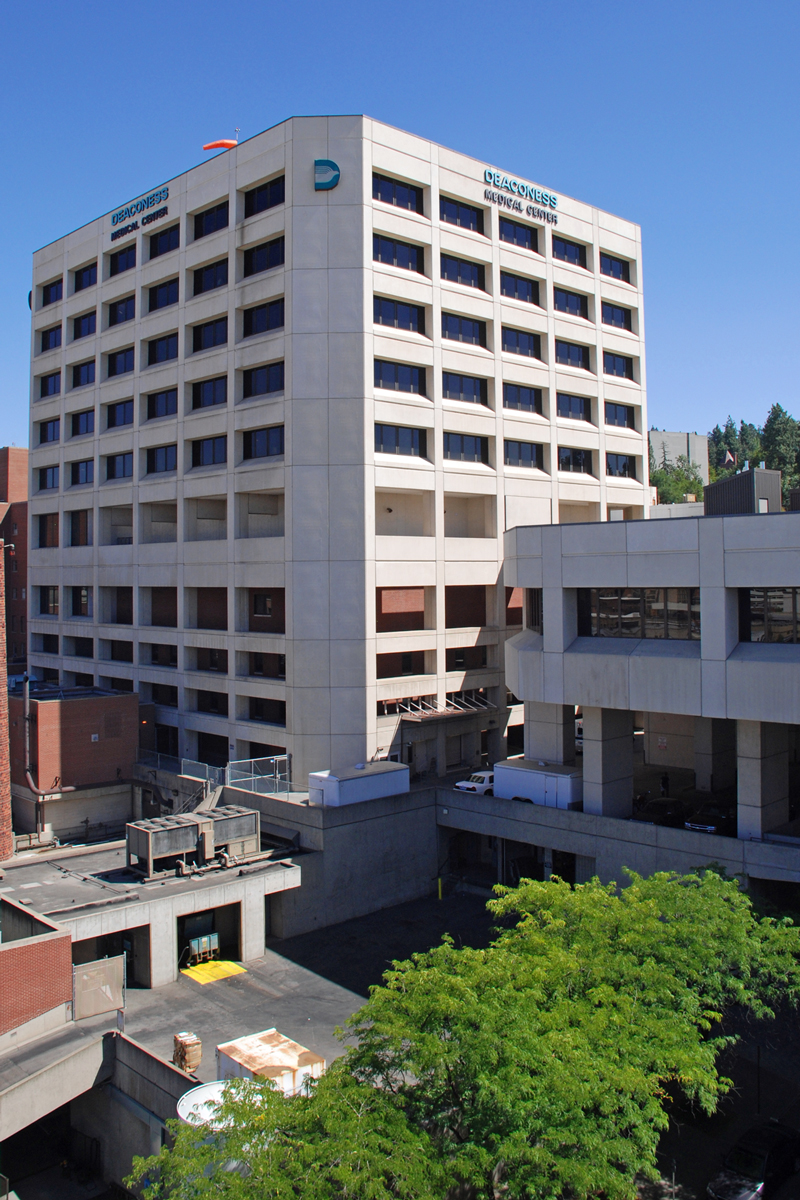
Deaconess Medical Center

The Spokane area has six major hospitals, four of which are full-service facilities. The health-care industry is a large and increasingly important industry in Spokane; the city provides specialized care to many patients from the surrounding Inland Northwest and as far north as the Canada–US border. The city's health-care needs are served primarily by non-profit Seattle-based Providence Health & Services and non-profit Tacoma-based Multicare Health System, which run the two biggest hospitals, Sacred Heart Medical Center, and Deaconess Hospital, respectively. These two hospitals, the 102-bed St. Luke's Rehabilitation Institute, 100-bed Inland Northwest Behavioral Health, and most of Spokane's major health-care facilities, are located on Spokane's Lower-South Hill, just south of downtown, in what is known as the "Medical District" of Spokane. Sacred Heart Hospital opened originally with just 31 beds on Spokane Falls Boulevard on January 27, 1887, but later moved to its present location at 101 West Eighth Avenue. As of 2014 it had 642 beds, with 28,319 admissions, 71,543 emergency room visits, and 2,982 births annually, and a full-time staff of 29 doctors and dentists and 583 registered nurses. Deaconess Medical Center, the smaller of the two main hospitals, had 388 beds as of 2014. Other hospitals in the area include the Spokane Veterans Affairs Medical Center in the northwest part of town, Providence Holy Family Hospital on the north side, and MultiCare Valley Hospital in the Spokane Valley. One of 20 specialty orthopedic Shriners Hospitals in the U.S. is also located in Spokane. One of Washington's two state psychiatric hospitals, Eastern State Hospital, is located 15 miles (24 km) away in Medical Lake.

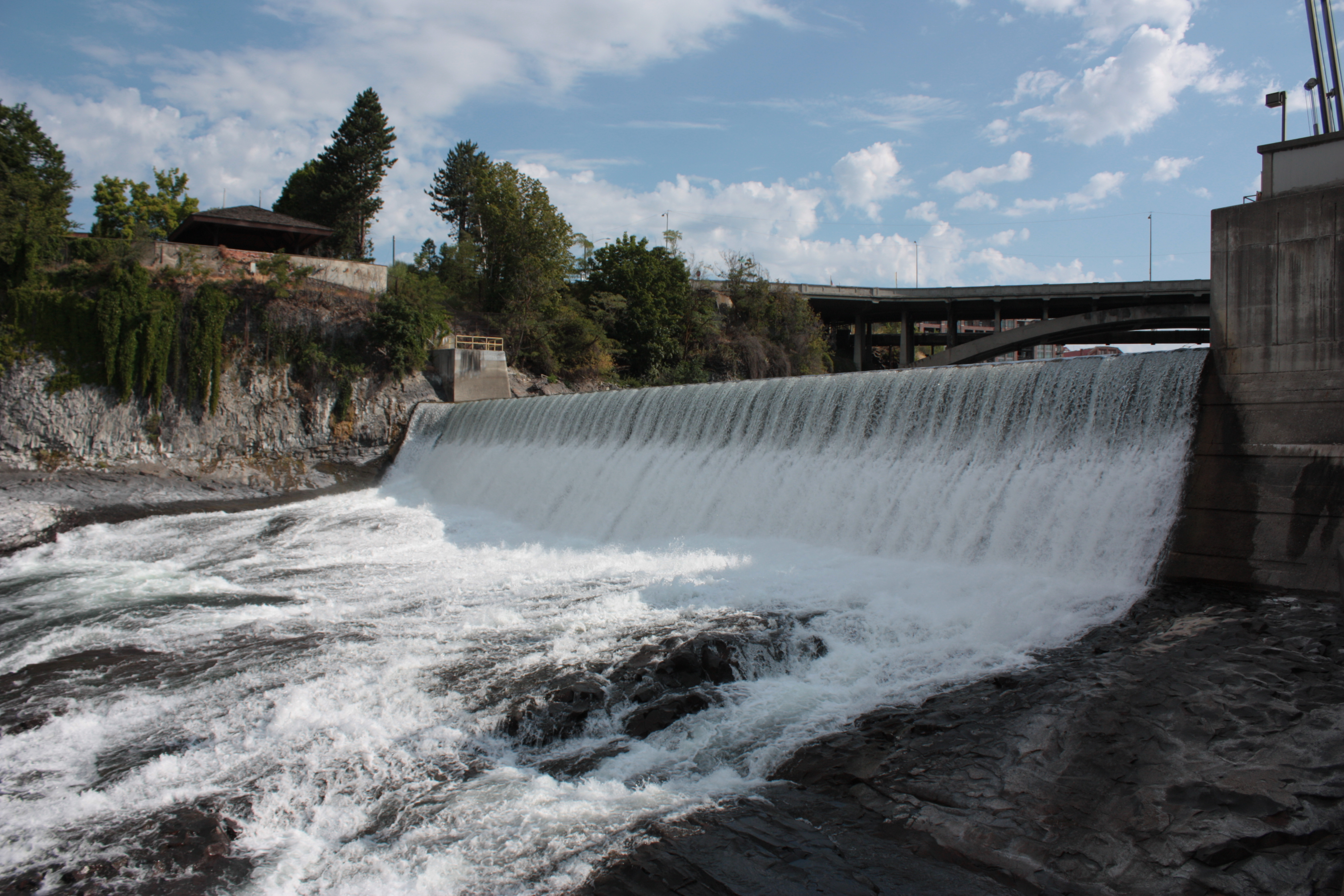
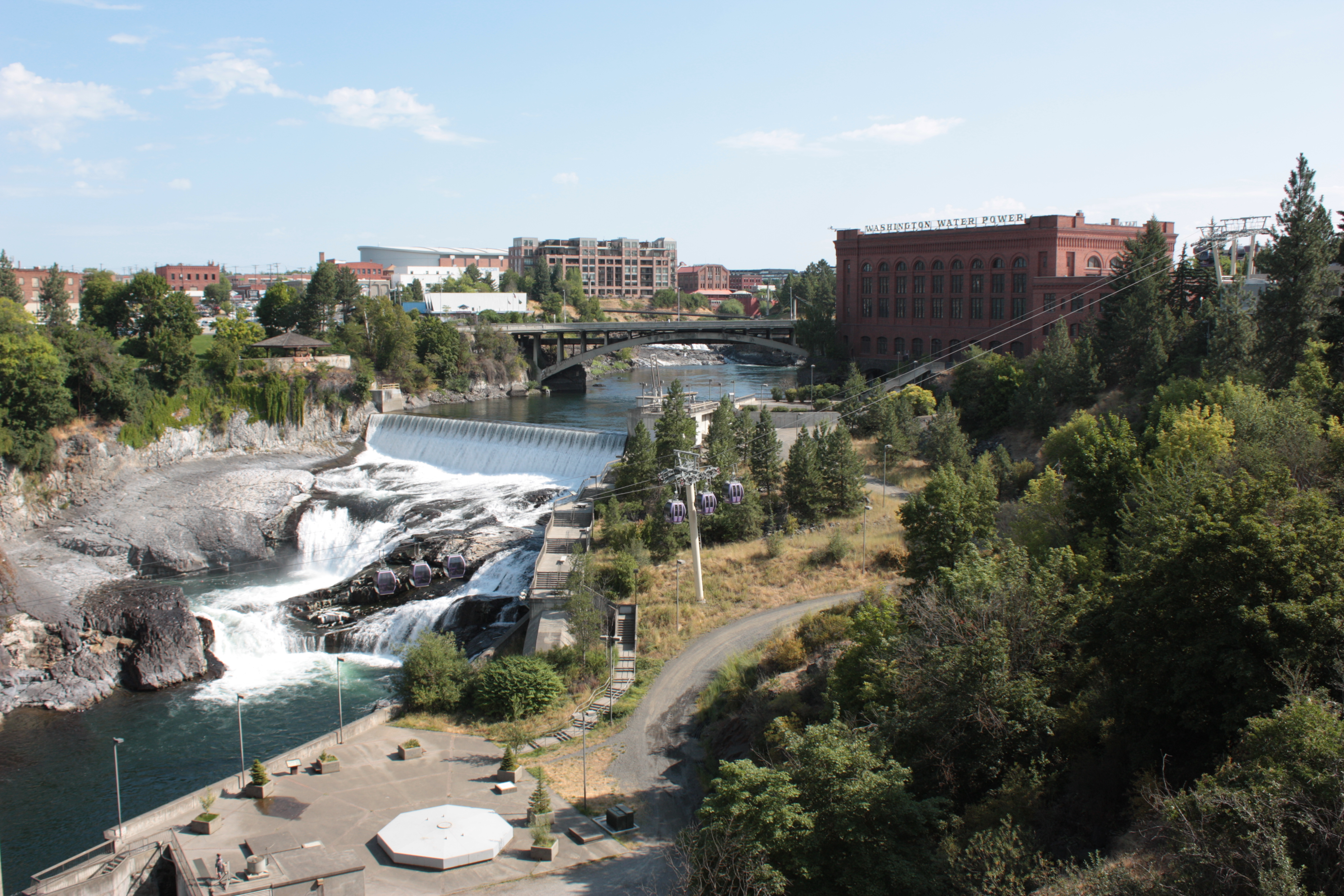
Monroe Street Dam on the Spokane River

=== Utilities ===
The City of Spokane provides municipal water, wastewater management, and solid waste management. Spokane operates Washington's only waste-to-energy plant as well as two solid waste transfer stations as part of the Spokane Regional Solid Waste System, a collaboration between the City of Spokane and Spokane County. Electricity generated by the waste-to-energy plant is used to operate the facility, with excess energy being sold to Puget Sound Energy. Spokane draws its water from the Spokane Valley–Rathdrum Prairie Aquifer; this 370-square-mile (958 km^{2}) "sole source aquifer" is the only water supply for Spokane County in Washington, and for Kootenai and Bonner counties in Idaho. Serving over 500,000 people, the aquifer is distinguished in being one of the largest aquifers in the country at 10 trillion gallons, as well as having one of the fastest flow rates in the country at 60 feet (18 m) per day, and for its purity.^{[i]}

Natural gas and electricity are provided by the local utility, Avista Utilities, while CenturyLink and Comcast provide television, internet, and telephone service. Spokane hosts three hydroelectric generation facilities on the Spokane River: the Upriver Dam, the Upper Falls Dam, and the Monroe Street Dam. The Upriver Dam is owned and operated by the City of Spokane, and generates the electricity needed to operate the municipal water supply's pressure pumps. The power generated in excess of that is sold to Avista Utilities. The Upper Falls and Monroe Street dams are owned and operated by Avista Utilities, and have respective generation capacities of 10 and 15 MW.

== Sister cities ==
Spokane has six current sister cities, as designated by Sister Cities International:

- Nishinomiya, Japan – since September 1961 (Spokane's first sister city)
- Jecheon, South Korea
- Jilin City, China
- Limerick, Ireland
- San Luis Potosí City, Mexico
- Cagli, Italy

== See also ==
- Spokane House
- Fort Colville
- Fort Spokane
- Spokane Falls
- Great Spokane Fire
- Expo '74
- Inland Northwest
- Riverfront Park

== Notes ==
^[a]The name is said to derive from Spukcane, the vocalization of a sound made by a snake which the Chief of the Spokanes came to call "power from the brain" after pondering it made his head vibrate. It is unknown when the present meaning of the word, "Sun People" replaced this earlier meaning.
^[b]Unbeknownst to them, the Spokane Valley was the only area within 200 miles that could provide passage to the Inland Empire through the Rockies at a reasonable grade.
^[c]The present name, set forth by an 1891 charter reincorporated the city under the name "Spokane Falls", stating: "The corporate name of the city is Spokane Falls, and by that name shall have perpetual succession" (Charter, Article I). However, a later article in that same charter which was voted on concurrently changed the name to "Spokane".
^[d]Secretary of the Spokane chamber of commerce, John R. Reavis tells of Spokane's significance to the Inland Northwest region as an entrepôt distributing center (largely the city's raison d'être) in his 1891 Annual Report, writing: "By reason of her geographical position and railroad connections Spokane is fitted as no other city is, or ever can be, to be the distributing center of all that country within a radius of 150 miles, and in some instances territory much farther away. There is no point 150 miles from Spokane that is not at least 225 miles from any other city of 10,000 population. We have about us a territory of 60,000 square miles in extent, to every point of which we are nearer than any other city, to every point of which we have better railroad connections and easier grades than any other city ... We have eight lines of railroad that radiate out in all directions through it, so that shipments made here in the morning can reach any point within its borders by nightfall. We have a telephone system connecting us with almost every shipping town and shipping station within its borders. Goods may be ordered, shipped and received, in most instances, within one day. Never was a city more intimately knit to its surrounding territory than Spokane, and never was one more free from a legitimate rival in trade ..."

^[e]The financing for rebuilding the downtown core came in large part from the infusion of investment from Dutch bankers; this investment was so deep that by 1896, one prominent Dutch mortgage company, the Northwestern and Pacific Hypotheekbank owned a quarter of the city.
^[f]In 1892, the Interstate Commerce Commission agreed with the city after it filed a complaint about these practices, but that decision was struck down by a federal court. In 1906, Spokane sued under the newly passed Hepburn Act, and won on July 24, 1911.
^[g]The exact circumstances and sequence of events regarding the discovery of the tree are obscure due to conflicting accounts.
^[h]Average monthly temperatures obtained by summing the average monthly highs and lows then dividing by 2.
^[i]A study published in The Spokesman-Review on May 6, 1909, by City bacteriologist, Frank Rose found only seven or eight germs per cubic centimeter of water. As a standard, "water that contains 100 germs per cubic centimeter is considered comparatively pure".
^[j]The Spokesman-Review has been a family-owned newspaper since 1894. The Cowles family also owns the city's NBC affiliate, KHQ-TV.
