= 2024 Spokane County elections =

- November 5, 2026

The 2024 Spokane County elections were held on November 5, 2024, in Spokane County, Washington, with primary elections held on August 6. Three of the five seats of the Board of County Commissioners were up for election, as well as two Spokane Superior Court positions.

Judicial positions in Spokane County are officially non-partisan; party affiliations do not appear on the ballot. All other positions are partisan.

== Board of County Commissioners ==
2024 Spokane County Board of Commissioners election
- November 5, 2024

3 of the 5 districts in the Spokane County Board of Commissioners 3 seats needed for a majority
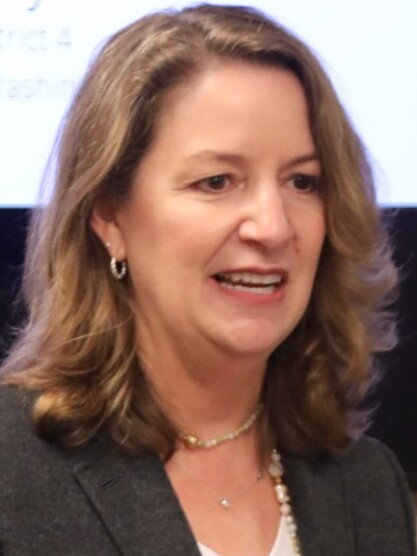

	Majority party	Minority party
Leader	Mary Kuney
Party	Republican	Democratic
Leader since	January 10, 2023
Leader's seat	District 4
Seats before	3	2
Seats after	3	2
Seat change	Steady	Steady
Popular vote	76,640	63,056
Percentage	53.1%	43.7%
Seats up	2	1
Races won	1	1
- Republican: 50–60% >90% Democratic: >90% No election
Chair before election
Mary Kuney
Republican
Elected Chair
Mary Kuney
Republican

Three of the five seats of the Board of County Commissioners were up for election to four-year terms. Incumbent supervisors Chris Jordan and Josh Kerns handily won re-election, but Al French faced a heavily competitive primary and general election, although he ultimately prevailed in re-election.

=== Position 1 ===
Incumbent County Commissioner Chris Jordan was uncontested in the primary. He was re-elected with 92.1% of the vote.

2024 Spokane County Commissioner election, District 1
Party	Candidate	Votes	%
Democratic	Chris Jordan (incumbent)	35,106	92.07
Write-in		2,659	6.97
Total votes		37,765	99.04
Democratic hold			

=== Position 3 ===
Incumbent County Commissioner Josh Kerns was uncontested in the primary. He was re-elected with 95.5% of the vote.

2024 Spokane County Commissioner election, District 3
Party	Candidate	Votes	%
Republican	Josh Kerns (incumbent)	47,155	95.50
Write-in		1,954	3.96
Total votes		49,109	99.46
Republican hold			

=== Position 5 ===
2024 Spokane County Commissioner election, District 5
- November 5, 2024
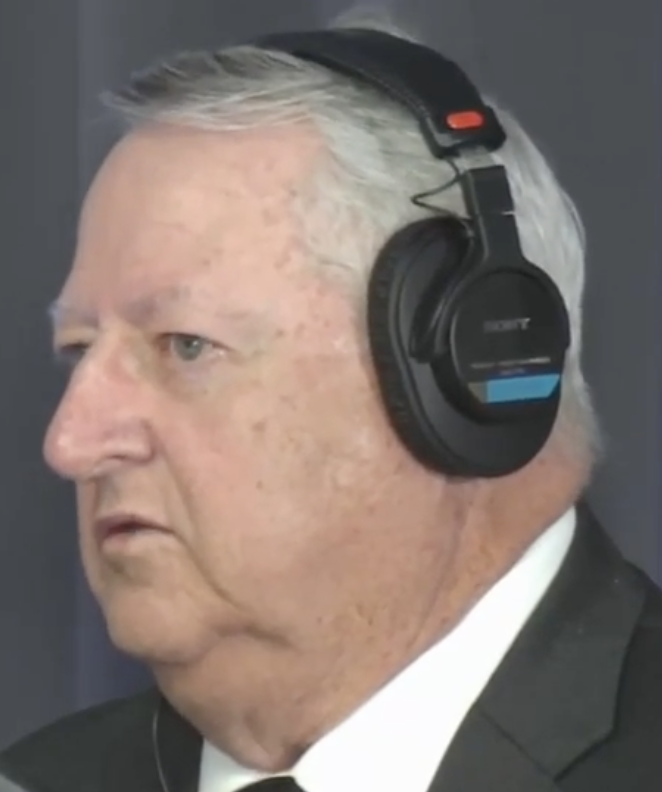

Candidate	Al French	Molly Marshall
Party	Republican	Democratic
Popular vote	29,485	27,950
Percentage	51.2%	48.6%
General election results by precinct
French:
50–60%
60–70%
70–80%
Marshall:
50–60%
60–70%
County Commissioner before election
Al French
Elected County Commissioner
Al French

==== Candidates ====
===== Advanced to general =====
- Al French, incumbent County Commissioner
- Molly Marshall, former Air Force pilot and non-profit founder

===== Endorsements =====
Al French (R)

State legislators

- Leonard Christian, state representative from the 4th district (2014, 2023-present)

Municipal officials

- Nadine Woodward, former Mayor of Spokane (2019-2023)
- Pam Haley, Mayor of Spokane Valley (2022-present)
- Diana Wilhite, former Mayor of Spokane Valley (2005-2007)
- Rod Higgins, Spokane Valley councilman (2013-present)
Molly Marshall (D)

State legislators

- Andy Billig, Majority Leader of the Washington State Senate (2019-present) and state senator from the 3rd district (2013-present)
- Marcus Riccelli, state representative from the 3rd district (2013-2025)
- Timm Ormsby, state representative from the 3rd district (2003-present)

County officials

- Chris Jordan, Spokane County Commissioner from the 1st district (2022-present)
- John Roskelley, former Spokane County Commissioner from the 1st district (1993-2004)
- Amber Waldref, Spokane County Commissioner from the 2nd district (2022-present)

City officials

- Lisa Brown, Mayor of Spokane (2024-present) and former state senator from the 3rd district (1997-2013)
- Paul Dillon, Spokane councilman (2024-present)
- Kitty Klitzke, Spokane councilwoman (2023-present)
- Betsy Wilkerson, Spokane councilwoman (2020-present)
- Zack Zappone, Spokane councilman (2022-present)
- Phyllis Holmes, former Spokane councilwoman (1993-2003)
- Candace Mumm, former Spokane councilwoman (2014-2021)
- Jon Snyder, former Spokane councilman (2009-2016)

Labor unions

- Washington Education Association
- International Association of Fire Fighters District 9

===== Debates =====
2024 Spokane County Commissioner election, District 5 debates
No.	Date	Host	Moderators	Link	Republican	Democratic
Key: P Participant A Absent N Not invited I Invited W Withdrawn						
Key: P Participant A Absent N Not invited I Invited W Withdrawn					French	Marshall
1	October 21, 2024	KSPS-TV (PBS)	Elena Perry; Eliza Billingham	YouTube	P	P

===== Results =====
2024 Spokane County Commissioner election, District 5
Party	Candidate	Votes	%
Republican	Al French (incumbent)	15,480	51.05
Democratic	Molly Marshall	14,744	48.63
Write-in		66	0.22
Total votes		30,290	100.0
Republican hold			
