= 2024 United States House of Representatives elections in Washington =

- November 5, 2024

All 10 Washington seats to the United States House of Representatives
	Majority party	Minority party
Party	Democratic	Republican
Last election	8	2
Seats won	8	2
Seat change	Steady	Steady
Popular vote	2,155,907	1,592,599
Percentage	57.21%	42.26%
Swing	▼0.67%	▲0.56%

Democratic:
50–60%
60–70%
70–80%
80–90%
90–100%
Republican:
50–60%
60–70%
70–80%
90–100%

The 2024 United States House of Representatives elections in Washington were held on November 5, 2024, to elect the ten U.S. representatives from the State of Washington, one from each of the state's 10 congressional districts. The elections coincided with the 2024 U.S. presidential election, as well as other elections to the House of Representatives, elections to the United States Senate, and various state and local elections. The primary elections took place on August 6, 2024 using a top-two primary system where candidates of all parties run against each other and the top two vote-getters advance to the general election.

== District 1 ==
2024 Washington's 1st congressional district election
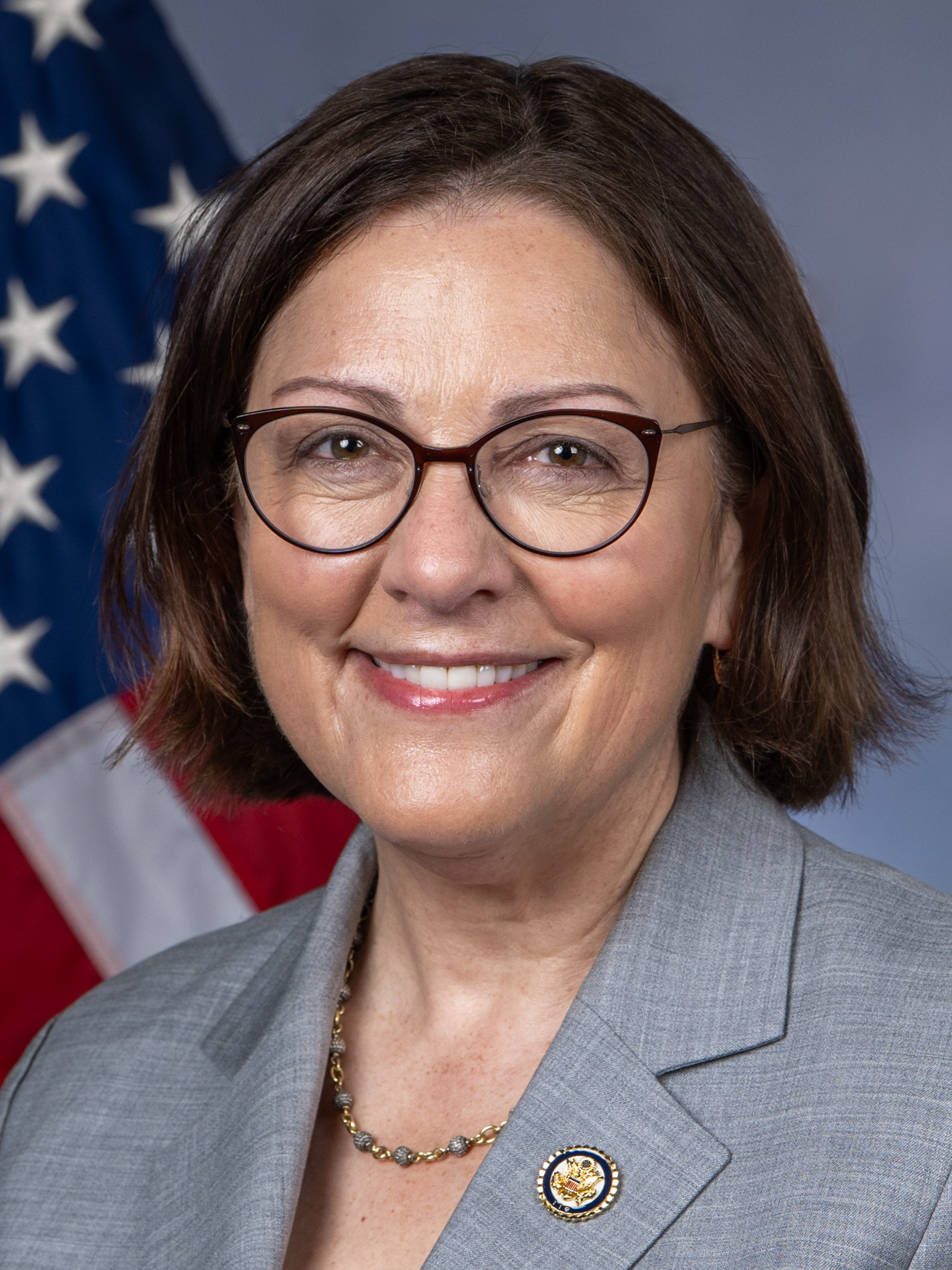

Nominee	Suzan DelBene	Jeb Brewer
Party	Democratic	Republican
Popular vote	227,213	132,538
Percentage	63.0%	36.7%
- DelBene: 40–50% 50–60% 60–70% 70–80% 80–90% >90% Brewer: 50–60% 60–70% >90% Tie: 40–50% 50% No votes
U.S. Representative before election
Suzan DelBene
Democratic
Elected U.S. Representative
Suzan DelBene
Democratic

The incumbent was Democrat Suzan DelBene, who was re-elected with 63.5% of the vote in 2022.

=== Candidates ===
==== Advanced to general ====
- Jeb Brewer (Republican), construction project executive
- Suzan DelBene (Democratic), incumbent U.S. representative

==== Eliminated in primary ====
- Derek Chartrand (Calm Rational GOP (Note: Not an actual political party. In Washington, independent candidates are allowed to choose a ballot label.)), sales executive and Republican candidate for this district in 2020 and 2022
- Matt Heines (Trump Republican), businessman and perennial candidate
- Mary Silva (Republican), audiologist
- Orion Webster (Republican), police officer

=== Endorsements ===
Suzan DelBene (D)

Organizations

- AIPAC
- Democratic Majority for Israel
- Feminist Majority PAC
- Humane Society Legislative Fund
- National Women's Political Caucus
- Planned Parenthood Action Fund
- Population Connection Action Fund

Labor unions

- National Education Association
- Washington State Labor Council

Newspapers

- The Seattle Times
- The Stranger

=== Fundraising ===
Campaign finance reports as of December 31, 2024
Candidate	Raised	Spent	Cash on hand
Suzan DelBene (D)	$3,850,571	$3,466,396	$1,063,721
Jeb Brewer (R)	$14,151	$12,920	$1,231
Mary Silva (R)*	$8,386	$8,147	$246
Derek Chartrand (R)*	$3,981	$4,159	$0
Matt Heines (O)*	$0	$0	$0
Orion Webster (R)*	$0	$0	$0
Source: Federal Election Commission

* Did not advance to the general election

==== Results ====
Results by county DelBene: 50–60% 70–80%

Blanket primary results
Party	Candidate	Votes	%
Democratic	Suzan DelBene (incumbent)	109,456	63.1
Republican	Jeb Brewer	17,675	10.2
Republican	Orion Webster	16,770	9.7
Republican	Mary Silva	11,339	6.5
Trump Republican	Matt Heines	10,815	6.2
Calm Rational GOP	Derek Chartrand	6,980	4.0
Write-in		392	0.2
Total votes		173,427	100.0

=== General election ===
==== Predictions ====
Source	Ranking	As of
The Cook Political Report	Solid D	February 2, 2023
Inside Elections	Solid D	September 15, 2023
Sabato's Crystal Ball	Safe D	February 23, 2023
Elections Daily	Safe D	September 7, 2023
CNalysis	Solid D	November 16, 2023

==== Results ====
2024 Washington's 1st congressional district election
Party	Candidate	Votes	%
Democratic	Suzan DelBene (incumbent)	227,213	63.0
Republican	Jeb Brewer	132,538	36.7
Write-in		907	0.3
Total votes		360,658	100.0
Democratic hold			

==== By county ====
County results
County	Suzan DelBene Democratic		Jeb Brewer Republican		Write-in Various		Margin		Total votes
County	#	%	#	%	#	%	#	%	Total votes
King (part)	99,256	71.75%	38,648	27.94%	439	0.32%	60,608	43.81%	138,343
Snohomish (part)	127,957	57.56%	93,890	42.23%	468	0.21%	34,067	15.32%	222,315
Totals	227,213	63.00%	132,538	36.75%	907	0.25%	94,675	26.25%	360,658

== District 2 ==
2024 Washington's 2nd congressional district election
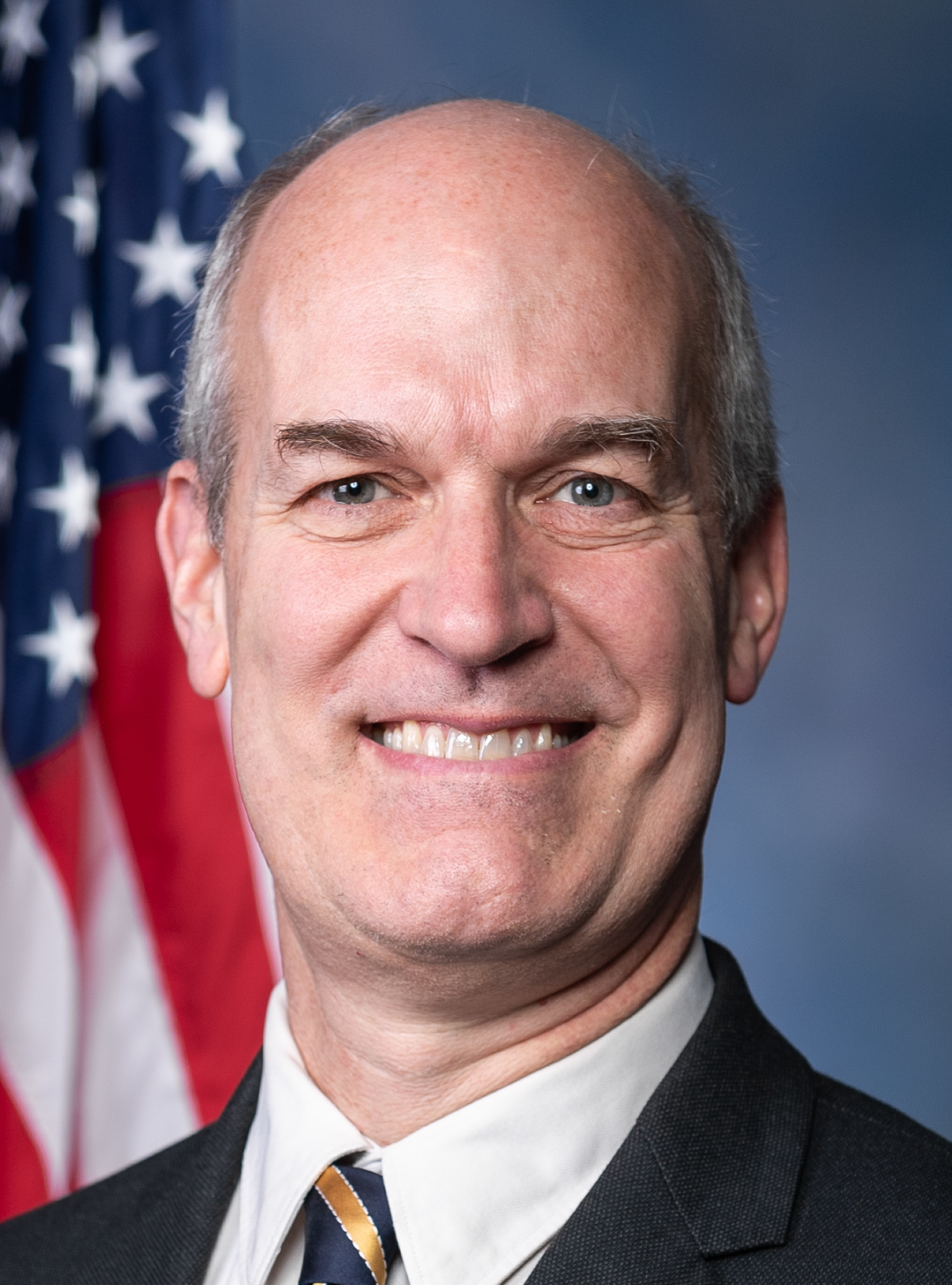

Nominee	Rick Larsen	Cody Hart
Party	Democratic	MAGA Republican
Popular vote	263,750	148,167
Percentage	63.8%	35.9%
- Larsen: 50–60% 60–70% 70–80% 80–90% >90% Hart: 40–50% 50–60% 60–70% 70–80% 80–90% Tie: 50% No votes
U.S. Representative before election
Rick Larsen
Democratic
Elected U.S. Representative
Rick Larsen
Democratic

The incumbent was Democrat Rick Larsen, who was re-elected with 60.2% of the vote in 2022.

=== Candidates ===
==== Advanced to general ====
- Cody Hart (MAGA Republican), engineering firm owner and Republican candidate for this district in 2020 and 2022
- Rick Larsen (Democratic), incumbent U.S. representative

==== Eliminated in primary ====
- Josh Binda (Democratic), Lynnwood city councilor
- Jason Call (Green), teacher, former Marianne Williamson 2024 presidential campaign deputy campaign manager, and Democratic candidate for this district in 2020 and 2022
- Devin Hermanson (Democratic), media consultant
- Leif Johnson (Republican), manufacturing engineer and candidate for this district in 2022
- Daniel Miller (Republican), business manager and perennial candidate
- Edwin Stickle (Democratic), physician

=== Endorsements ===
Jason Call (G)

Individuals

- Howie Klein, former president of Reprise Records (1989–2001) and adjunct professor at McGill University (Democratic)
- Heather Digby Parton, political blogger (Democratic)

Organizations

- Washington State Green Party
Rick Larsen (D)

Labor unions

- Association of Flight Attendants
- International Federation of Professional and Technical Engineers
- National Education Association
- Washington State Labor Council
- SEIU 775

Organizations

- Giffords
- League of Conservation Voters
- AIPAC
- Humane Society Legislative Fund
- National Organization for Women PAC
- Population Connection

=== Fundraising ===
Campaign finance reports as of December 31, 2024
Candidate	Raised	Spent	Cash on hand
Rick Larsen (D)	$2,450,006	$2,462,845	$247,436
Cody Hart (R)	Did Not File		
Jason Call (G)*	$76,694	$79,597	$0
Devin Hermanson (D)*	$30,405	$30,405	$0
Leif Johnson (R)*	$9,220	$9,275	$0
Josh Binda (D)*	$9,118	$7,718	$0
Daniel Miller (R)*	$0	$0	$0
Herbert Stickle (D)^{†}	$4,125	$3,042	$350
Source: Federal Election Commission

* Did not advance to the general election

^{†} Did not file for the primary election

==== Results ====
Results by county Larsen: 40–50% 50–60%

Blanket primary results
Party	Candidate	Votes	%
Democratic	Rick Larsen (incumbent)	106,276	48.1
MAGA Republican	Cody Hart	43,637	19.8
Republican	Leif Johnson	23,340	10.6
Republican	Daniel Miller	11,781	5.3
Democratic	Josh Binda	10,497	4.8
Democratic	Devin Hermanson	9,578	4.3
Green	Jason Call	7,787	3.5
Democratic	Edwin Stickle	7,692	3.5
Write-in		197	0.1
Total votes		220,785	100.0

=== General election ===
==== Predictions ====
Source	Ranking	As of
The Cook Political Report	Solid D	February 2, 2023
Inside Elections	Solid D	September 15, 2023
Sabato's Crystal Ball	Safe D	February 23, 2023
Elections Daily	Safe D	September 7, 2023
CNalysis	Solid D	November 16, 2023

==== Results ====
2024 Washington's 2nd congressional district election
Party	Candidate	Votes	%
Democratic	Rick Larsen (incumbent)	263,750	63.8
MAGA Republican	Cody Hart	148,167	35.9
Write-in		1,303	0.3
Total votes		413,220	100.0
Democratic hold			

==== By county ====
County results
County	Rick Larsen Democratic		Cody Hart MAGA Republican		Write-in Various		Margin		Total votes
County	#	%	#	%	#	%	#	%	Total votes
Island	30,936	60.30%	20,234	39.44%	136	0.27%	10,702	20.86%	51,306
San Juan	9,726	76.78%	2,840	22.42%	101	0.80%	6,886	54.36%	12,667
Skagit	39,052	57.18%	29,095	42.60%	151	0.22%	9,957	14.58%	68,298
Snohomish (part)	97,358	66.59%	48,365	33.08%	488	0.33%	48,993	33.51%	146,211
Whatcom	86,678	64.33%	47,633	35.35%	427	0.32%	39,045	28.98%	134,738
Totals	263,750	63.83%	148,167	35.86%	1,303	0.32%	115,592	27.97%	413,220

== District 3 ==
2024 Washington's 3rd congressional district election
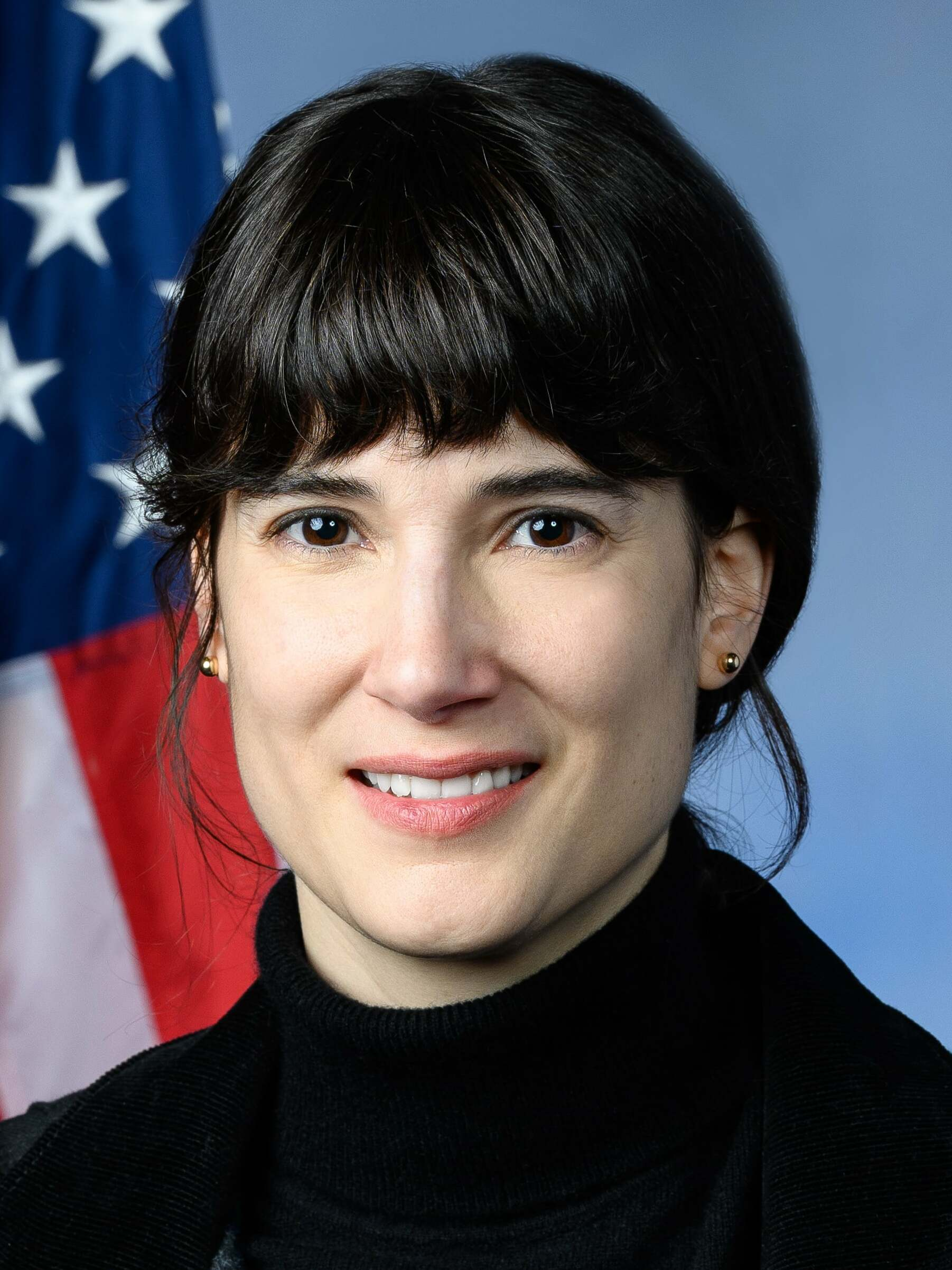

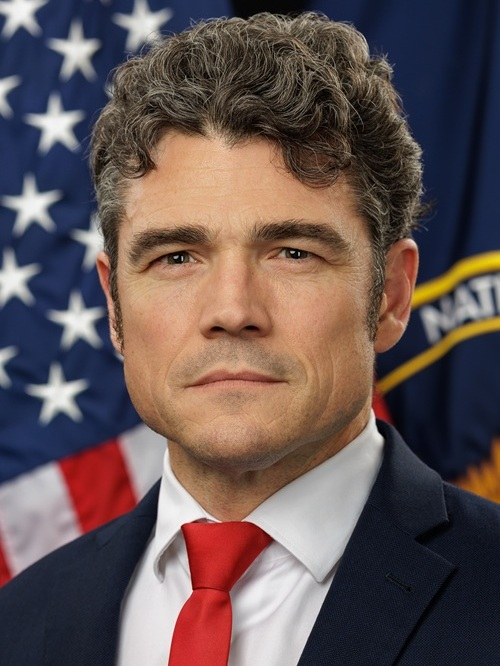
Nominee	Marie Gluesenkamp Perez	Joe Kent
Party	Democratic	Republican
Popular vote	215,177	199,054
Percentage	51.7%	47.9%
- Gluesenkamp Perez: 40–50% 50–60% 60–70% 70–80% 80–90% Kent: 40–50% 50–60% 60–70% 70–80% 80–90% No data
U.S. Representative before election
Marie Gluesenkamp Perez
Democratic
Elected U.S. Representative
Marie Gluesenkamp Perez
Democratic

The incumbent was Democrat Marie Gluesenkamp Perez, who flipped the district and was elected with 50.1% of the vote in 2022 in what was considered to be a major upset. This was a rematch of the 2022 election. Marie Perez was considered to be one of the most vulnerable Democratic Representatives in 2024 due to the district's partisan lean with most polling considering the election to be a toss-up. Perez ultimately won re-election, improving on her narrow victory from 2 years earlier.

President Donald Trump won the district by 3.3% on the same ballot.

=== Candidates ===
==== Advanced to general ====
- Joe Kent (Republican), technology project manager and runner-up for this district in 2022
- Marie Gluesenkamp Perez (Democratic), incumbent U.S. representative

==== Eliminated in primary ====
- Leslie Lewallen (Republican), Camas city councilor
- John Saulie-Rohman (Independent)

=== Endorsements ===
Leslie Lewallen (R)

State executive officials

- Rob McKenna, former Washington Attorney General (2005–2013)
- Sam Reed, former Washington Secretary of State (2001–2013)

State legislators

- Richard DeBolt, former state representative from the 20th district (1997–2021)
- Larry Hoff, former state representative from the 18th district (2019–2023)
- J.T. Wilcox, state representative from the 2nd district (2011–present)

Local officials

- Reagan Dunn, King County councilor (2005–present)

Individuals

- Tiffany Smiley, nurse and runner-up for U.S. Senate in 2022
- Heidi St. John, author and candidate for this district in 2022

Newspapers

- The Columbian (co-endorsement with Perez)
Marie Gluesenkamp Perez (D)

Statewide officials

- Gretchen Whitmer, governor of Michigan (2019–present)

Organizations

- Vote Common Good
- AIPAC
- Democratic Majority for Israel
- EMILY's List
- End Citizens United
- WelcomePAC
- Alliance for Retired Americans
- Climate Hawks Vote
- Feminist Majority Foundation
- Fuse Washington
- Leadership Now Project
- Humane Society Legislative Fund
- Jewish Democratic Council of America
- Latino Victory Fund
- National Women's Political Caucus
- Population Connection
- Washington Farm Bureau
- Indivisible Olympia
- Sierra Club

Labor unions

- American Federation of State, County and Municipal Employees Council 28
- Associated General Contractors Washington
- Communications Workers of America
- International Association of Fire Fighters
- National Education Association
- Washington Association of Police Organizations
- Washington State Labor Council
- International Federation of Professional and Technical Engineers
- International Association of Machinists Local 751
- SEIU 775
- United Food and Commercial Workers Local 3000

Newspapers

- The Columbian (co-endorsement with Lewallen)
Joe Kent (R)

Executive branch officials

- Donald Trump, former President of the United States (2017–2021)

U.S. representatives

- Mike Johnson, Speaker of the United States House of Representatives (2023–present) from LA-04 (2017–present)

Organizations

- House Freedom Fund
- Latinos for Trump
- Republicans for National Renewal

Party chapters

- Clark County Republican Party
- Cowlitz County Republican Party
- Lewis County Republican Party

Political parties

- Washington State Republican Party

=== Fundraising ===
Campaign finance reports as of December 31, 2024
Candidate	Raised	Spent	Cash on hand
Marie Gluesenkamp Perez (D)	$11,856,002	$11,895,854	$26,460
Joe Kent (R)	$2,654,420	$2,708,358	$0
Leslie Lewallen (R)*	$840,313 (Note: $6,610 of this total was self-funded by Lewallen.)	$840,313	$0
John Saulie (I)*	$100	$99	$0
Leslie French (R)^{†}	$6,433 (Note: This total in its entirety was self-funded by French.)	$13,172	$0
Brent Hennrich (D)^{†}	$498	$1,345	$0
Source: Federal Election Commission

* Did not advance to the general election

^{†} Did not file for the primary election

=== Polling ===
Poll source	Date(s) administered	Sample size (Note: Key: A – all adults RV – registered voters LV – likely voters V – unclear)	Margin of error	Marie Gluesenkamp Perez (D)	Joe Kent (R)	Leslie Lewallen (R)	John Saulie- Rohman (I)	Undecided
Cygnal (R) (Note: Poll sponsored by Kent's campaign)	June 20–22, 2024	400 (LV)	± 4.9%	38%	34%	6%	3%	19%

=== Results ===
Results by county Gluesenkamp Perez: 40–50%; 50–60%; Kent: 40–50%; 50–60%

Blanket primary results
Party	Candidate	Votes	%
Democratic	Marie Gluesenkamp Perez (incumbent)	97,274	45.9
Republican	Joe Kent	83,389	39.3
Republican	Leslie Lewallen	25,868	12.2
Independent	John Saulie-Rohman	5,406	2.5
Write-in		186	0.1
Total votes		212,123	100.0

=== General election ===
==== Predictions ====
Source	Ranking	As of
The Cook Political Report	Tossup	February 2, 2023
Inside Elections	Tossup	September 15, 2023
Sabato's Crystal Ball	Lean R (flip)	November 4, 2024
Elections Daily	Lean D	November 4, 2024
CNalysis	Tilt D	November 3, 2024
DDHQ/The Hill	Lean R (flip)	August 26, 2024

==== Debates ====
2024 Washington's 3rd congressional district election debates
No.	Date	Host	Moderators	Link	Democratic	Republican
Key: P Participant A Absent N Not invited I Invited W Withdrawn						
Key: P Participant A Absent N Not invited I Invited W Withdrawn					Perez	Kent
1	October 2, 2024	Cowlitz Civil Dialogue Project	Melanee Green Evans; Stephen Warning	C-SPAN	P	P
2	October 7, 2024	Willamette University	Steve Benham	YouTube	P	P
3	October 14, 2024	KOIN	Lisa Balick; Ken Boddie	YouTube (Part 1); YouTube (Part 2)	P	P
4	October 17, 2024	KGW	Laural Porter	KGW (Part 1); YouTube (Part 2)	P	P

==== Polling ====
Poll source	Date(s) administered	Sample size	Margin of error	Marie Gluesenkamp Perez (D)	Joe Kent (R)	Undecided
Public Policy Polling (D) (Note: Poll sponsored by the Northwest Progressive Institute.)	October 1–2, 2024	624 (LV)	± 3.9%	45%	46%	8%
Cygnal (R)	June 20–22, 2024	400 (LV)	± 4.9%	42%	42%	16%
Public Policy Polling (D)	June 11–12, 2024	649 (RV)	± 3.9%	45%	46%	9%

=== Results ===
2024 Washington's 3rd congressional district election
Party	Candidate	Votes	%
Democratic	Marie Gluesenkamp Perez (incumbent)	215,177	51.7
Republican	Joe Kent	199,054	47.9
Write-in		1,673	0.4
Total votes		415,904	100.0
Democratic hold			

==== By county ====
County results
County	Marie Gluesenkamp Perez Democratic		Joe Kent Republican		Write-in Various		Margin		Total votes
County	#	%	#	%	#	%	#	%	Total votes
Clark	152,388	56.24%	117,380	43.32%	1,203	0.44%	35,008	12.92%	270,971
Cowlitz	25,982	44.63%	31,996	54.97%	233	0.40%	-6,014	-10.33%	58,211
Lewis	17,430	39.08%	27,046	60.64%	123	0.28%	-9,616	-21.56%	44,599
Pacific	7,466	53.46%	6,469	46.32%	31	0.22%	997	7.14%	13,966
Skamania	3,501	48.54%	3,693	51.20%	19	0.26%	-192	-2.66%	7,213
Thurston (part)	6,995	39.03%	10,872	60.67%	54	0.30%	-3,877	-21.63%	17,921
Wahkiakum	1,415	46.81%	1,598	52.86%	10	0.33%	-183	-6.05%	3,023
Totals	215,177	51.74%	199,054	47.86%	1,673	0.40%	16,123	3.88%	415,904

== District 4 ==
2024 Washington's 4th congressional district election

Nominee	Dan Newhouse	Jerrod Sessler
Party	Republican	Republican
Popular vote	153,477	136,175
Percentage	52.0%	46.2%
- Newhouse: 40–50% 50–60% 60–70% 70–80% 80–90% >90% Sessler: 40–50% 50–60% 60–70% 70–80% 80–90% >90% Tie: 40–50% 50% No votes
U.S. Representative before election
Dan Newhouse
Republican
Elected U.S. Representative
Dan Newhouse
Republican

The incumbent was Republican Dan Newhouse, who was re-elected with 66.5% of the vote in 2022.

=== Candidates ===
==== Advanced to general ====
- Dan Newhouse (Republican), incumbent U.S. representative
- Jerrod Sessler (Republican), home repair business founder, former NASCAR driver, and candidate for this district in 2022

==== Eliminated in primary ====
- Mary Baechler (Democratic), stroller company founder and runner-up for this district in 2012
- Benny Garcia (Independent), loan underwriter and candidate for this district in 2022
- Barry Knowles (Democratic), home inspection business owner and former Republican P.C.O. for LD-47
- John Malan (MAGA Democrat), electrician and Democratic candidate for this district in 2016
- Jane Muchlinski (Democratic), photography studio manager
- Tiffany Smiley (Republican), nurse and runner-up for U.S. Senate in 2022

==== Declined ====
- Loren Culp (Republican), former Republic police chief, candidate for this district in 2022, and runner-up for governor in 2020

==== Endorsements ====
Dan Newhouse (R)

U.S. representatives

- Brian Babin, U.S. representative from Texas' 36th district
- Rodney Frelinghuysen, former U.S. representative from New Jersey's 11th district
- Russ Fulcher, U.S. representative from Idaho's 1st district
- Doc Hastings, former U.S. representative from this district (1995–2015)
- Debbie Lesko, U.S. representative from Arizona's 8th district
- Steve Scalise, House Majority Leader and U.S. representative from Louisiana's' 1st district
- Pete Sessions, U.S. representative from Texas's 17th district
- Greg Walden, former U.S. representative from Oregon's 2nd district

State executive officials

- Sam Reed, former Washington Secretary of State

State legislators

- Tom Dent, state representative from the 13th district
- Judy Warnick, state senator from the 13th district
- Alex Ybarra, state representative from the 13th district

Organizations

- AIPAC
- Americans for Prosperity
- ClearPath Action Fund
- Congressional Leadership Fund
- House Freedom Fund
- Mainstream Republicans of Washington
- National Federation of Independent Business
- National Right to Life Committee
- NRA Political Victory Fund
- Republican Jewish Coalition
- Republican Main Street Partnership
- Susan B. Anthony Pro-Life America
- U.S. Chamber of Commerce (post-primary)
- Washington Association of Police Organizations
- Washington Farm Bureau
- Washington Retail Federation

Individuals

- Doug White, farmer and runner-up for this district in 2022 (Democratic)

Political parties

- Benton County Democratic Party (Democratic)
- Douglas County Republican Party
- Franklin County Democratic Party (Democratic)
- Grant County Democratic Party (Democratic)
- Grant County Republican Party
- Klickitat County Democratic Party (Democratic)
- Klickitat County Republican Party

Tribes

- Confederated Tribes of the Colville Reservation

Unions

- United Association Local 598

Newspapers

- Tri-City Herald
Jerrod Sessler (R)

Executive branch officials

- Michael Flynn, 24th United States National Security Advisor (2017) and former Director of the Defense Intelligence Agency (2012–2014)
- Donald Trump, 45th president of the United States (2017–2021) (co-endorsement with Smiley)

Individuals

- Roger Stone, political consultant and lobbyist

Political parties

- Douglas County Republican Party
- Washington State Republican Party

Organizations

- ClearPath Action Fund
- House Freedom Fund
Tiffany Smiley (R)

Executive branch officials

- Donald Trump, 45th president of the United States (2017–2021) (co-endorsement with Sessler)

=== Fundraising ===
Campaign finance reports as of December 31, 2024
Candidate	Raised	Spent	Cash on hand
Dan Newhouse (R)	$2,512,639	$2,422,533	$104,807
Jerrod Sessler (R)	$792,239 (Note: $300,000 of this total was self-funded by Sessler.)	$719,282	$75,003
Tiffany Smiley (R)*	$1,068,852	$1,046,798	$22,062
Birdie Jane Muchlinski (D)*	$12,676 (Note: $1,000 of this total was self-funded by Muchlinski.)	$12,676	$0
Mary Baechler (D)*	$0	$0	$0
Benny Garcia (I)*	$0	$0	$0
John Malan (O)*	$0	$0	$0
Cherissa Boyd (D)^{†}	$5,585	$4,910	$675
Source: Federal Election Commission

* Did not advance to the general election

^{†} Did not file for the primary election

=== Polling ===
Poll source	Date(s) administered	Sample size	Margin of error	Mary Baechler (D)	Barry Knowles (D)	Dan Newhouse (R)	Jerrod Sessler (R)	Tiffany Smiley (R)	Other	Undecided
Newton Health (R) (Note: Poll sponsored by Smiley's campaign)	June 24–26, 2024	400 (LV)	± 5%	9%	9%	21%	11%	30%	6% (Note: Benny Garcia (I), John Malan (I), and Jane Muchlinski (D) with 2%)	19%

==== Results ====
Results by county Sessler: 30–40%

Blanket primary results
Party	Candidate	Votes	%
Republican	Jerrod Sessler	51,020	33.1
Republican	Dan Newhouse (incumbent)	36,073	23.4
Republican	Tiffany Smiley	29,761	19.3
Democratic	Mary Baechler	22,353	14.5
Democratic	Jane Muchlinski	9,593	6.2
Democratic	Barry Knowles	3,329	2.2
Independent	Benny Garcia	1,389	0.9
MAGA Democrat	John Malan	711	0.5
Write-in		98	0.1
Total votes		154,327	100.0

=== General election ===
==== Predictions ====
Source	Ranking	As of
The Cook Political Report	Solid R	February 2, 2023
Inside Elections	Solid R	September 15, 2023
Sabato's Crystal Ball	Safe R	February 23, 2023
Elections Daily	Safe R	September 7, 2023
CNalysis	Solid R	November 16, 2023

==== Results ====
2024 Washington's 4th congressional district election
Party	Candidate	Votes	%
Republican	Dan Newhouse (incumbent)	153,477	52.0
Republican	Jerrod Sessler	136,175	46.2
Write-in		5,400	1.8
Total votes		295,052	100.0
Republican hold			

==== By county ====
County results
County	Dan Newhouse Republican		Jerrod Sessler Republican		Write-in Various		Margin		Total votes
County	#	%	#	%	#	%	#	%	Total votes
Adams (part)	1,259	46.54%	1,387	51.28%	59	2.18%	-128	-4.73%	2,705
Benton	51,153	53.14%	43,717	45.42%	1,391	1.45%	7,436	7.72%	96,261
Douglas (part)	9,845	51.12%	9,113	47.32%	302	1.57%	732	3.80%	19,260
Franklin (part)	13,756	51.87%	12,385	46.70%	381	1.44%	1,371	5.17%	26,522
Grant	16,029	47.18%	17,437	51.33%	505	1.49%	-1,408	-4.14%	33,971
Klickitat	6,936	56.90%	4,928	40.43%	326	2.67%	2,008	16.47%	12,190
Okanogan	10,483	54.12%	8,527	44.02%	361	1.86%	1,956	10.10%	19,371
Yakima	44,016	51.92%	38,681	45.63%	2,075	2.45%	5,335	6.29%	84,772
Totals	153,477	52.02%	136,175	46.15%	5,400	1.83%	17,302	5.86%	295,052

== District 5 ==
2024 Washington's 5th congressional district election
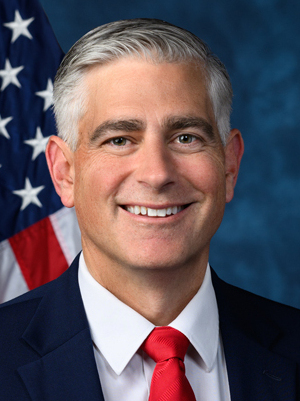

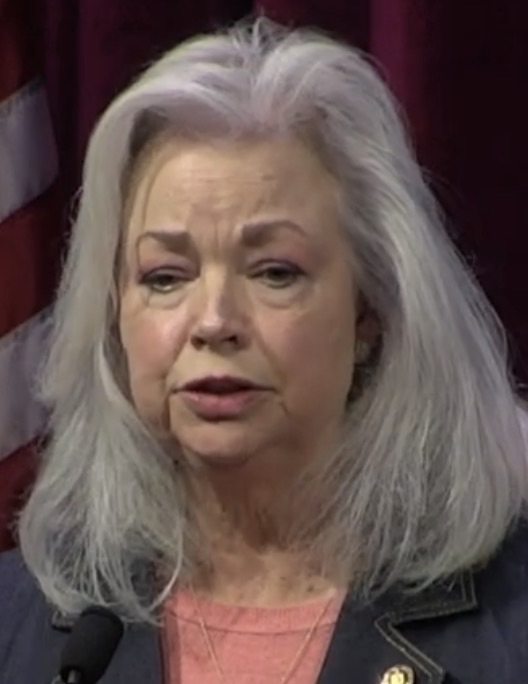
Nominee	Michael Baumgartner	Carmela Conroy
Party	Republican	Democratic
Popular vote	240,619	156,074
Percentage	60.6%	39.3%
- Baumgartner: 50–60% 60–70% 70–80% 80–90% Conroy: 50–60% 60–70% 70–80% 80–90% Tie: 50% No votes
U.S. Representative before election
Cathy McMorris Rodgers
Republican
Elected U.S. Representative
Michael Baumgartner
Republican

The incumbent was Republican Cathy McMorris Rodgers, who was re-elected with 59.1% of the vote in 2022. On February 8, 2024, McMorris Rodgers announced she would not seek re-election after serving 10 terms.

=== Candidates ===
==== Advanced to general ====
- Michael Baumgartner (Republican), Spokane County Treasurer (2019–present), former state senator from the 6th district (2011–2019), and runner-up for U.S. Senate in 2012
- Carmela Conroy (Democratic), former chair of the Spokane County Democratic Party

==== Eliminated in primary ====
- Bernadine Bank (Democratic), obstetrician/gynecologist
- Jonathan Bingle (Republican), Spokane city councilor (2021–present) (endorsed Baumgartner)
- Ann Marie Danimus (Democratic), marketing firm owner and candidate for this district in 2022
- Brian Dansel (Republican), Ferry County commissioner (2011–2013, 2023–present), former special assistant to the U.S. Secretary of Agriculture, and former state senator from the 7th district (2013–2017) (endorsed Baumgartner)
- Rick Flynn (Republican), farmer
- Rene Holaday (Republican), talk radio host and former aide to state representative Matt Shea
- Jacquelin Maycumber (Republican), state representative from the 7th district (2017–present) (endorsed Baumgartner)
- Matthew Welde (Democratic), Kootenai County, Idaho deputy prosecuting attorney

==== Withdrawn ====
- Bobbi Bennett-Wolcott (Democratic), doctor of nursing practice (endorsed Bank, remained on ballot)
- Terri Cooper (Republican), mayor of Medical Lake (2021–present)
- Cathy McMorris Rodgers (Republican), incumbent U.S. representative
- Michael Schmidt, cattle rancher (running for state house)

==== Declined ====
- Andy Billig (Democratic), Majority Leader of the Washington Senate (2019–present) from the 3rd district (2013–present) (endorsed Conroy)
- Lisa Brown (Democratic), mayor of Spokane (2024–present) and runner-up for this district in 2018 (endorsed Conroy)
- Chris Cargill (Republican), Spokane Valley city councilor
- Michael Cathcart (Republican), Spokane city councilor (endorsed Baumgartner)
- David Condon (Republican), former mayor of Spokane (2011–2019) (endorsed Baumgartner)
- Mary Dye (Republican), state representative from the 9th district (2015–present) (endorsed Maycumber)
- Al French (Republican), Spokane County commissioner
- Natasha Hill (Democratic), attorney and runner-up for this district in 2022 (running for state house)
- Jeff Holy (Republican), state senator from the 6th district (2019–present) (endorsed Baumgartner)
- Josh Kerns (Republican), Spokane County commissioner
- Mary Kuney (Republican), chair of the Spokane County Commission (endorsed Maycumber)
- Bob McCaslin (Republican), former state representative from the 4th district (2014–2023)
- Kevin Parker (Republican), former state representative from the 6th district (2009–2017)
- Marcus Riccelli (Democratic), state representative from the 3rd district (2013–present) (endorsed Conroy, running for state senate)
- Ben Stuckart (Democratic), former president of the Spokane City Council and runner-up for mayor of Spokane in 2019 (running for state house)
- Betsy Wilkerson (Democratic), president of the Spokane City Council
- Nadine Woodward (Republican), former mayor of Spokane (2019–2023) (endorsed Baumgartner)

=== Endorsements ===
Bernadine Bank (D)

Political parties

- Spokane County Democratic Party (co-endorsement with Conroy)
Michael Baumgartner (R)

U.S. representatives

- Cathy McMorris Rodgers, incumbent U.S. representative (post-primary)

Executive branch officials

- Ryan Crocker, former U.S. Career Ambassador (2004-2012)
- Brian Dansel, Ferry County commissioner (2011–2013, 2023–present), former special assistant to the U.S. Secretary of Agriculture, former state senator from the 7th district (2013–2017), and candidate for this district (post-primary)
- Morgan Ortagus, former spokesperson for the U.S. State Department (2019-2021)

State executive officials

- Rob McKenna, former Washington Attorney General (2005–2013)
- Scott Walker, former governor of Wisconsin (2011-2019)

State legislators

- John Braun, Washington Senate Majority Leader and state senator from the 20th district
- Jeff Holy, state senator from the 6th district (2018–present)
- Jacquelin Maycumber, state representative from the 7th district (2017–present) and candidate for this district (post-primary)
- Mike Padden, state senator from the 4th district (2011–present)
- Dino Rossi, state senator from the 5th district (1997–2003, 2012, 2016–2017)
- Mike Volz, state representative from the 6th district (2017–present)
- Lynda Wilson, state senator from the 17th district (2017–present)

Individuals

- Brian Heywood, activist
- Susan Hutchison, former chair of the Washington State Republican Party (2013–2018)
- John Stockton, former NBA player
- Jack Thompson, former NFL player

Local officials

- Jonathan Bingle, Spokane city councilor and candidate for this district (post-primary)
- Michael Cathcart, Spokane city councilor
- David Condon, former mayor of Spokane (2011–2019)
- Nadine Woodward, former mayor of Spokane (2019–2023)

Political parties

- Franklin County Republican Party
- Spokane County Republican Party (post-primary)
- Walla Walla County Republican Party
- Washington State Republican Party (post-primary)
- Whitman County Republican Party

Organizations

- AIPAC
- Americans for Tax Reform
- Associated General Contractors of America
- HUCK PAC
- National Federation of Independent Business
- NRA Political Victory Fund
- Washington Association of Police Organizations
- Washington Retail Federation

Tribes

- Confederated Tribes of the Colville Reservation
- Kalispel Indian Community of the Kalispel Reservation
- Spokane Tribe of Indians

Newspapers

- The Spokesman-Review
- Tri-City Herald
Carmela Conroy (D)

State legislators

- Andy Billig, Majority Leader of the Washington Senate (2019–present) from the 3rd district (2013–present)
- Marcus Riccelli, state representative from the 3rd district (2013–present)

Local officials

- Lisa Brown, mayor of Spokane (2024–present) and runner up for this district in 2018
- Elizabeth Spring, nurse and Newport city councilor (2024-present)

Political parties

- Spokane County Democratic Party (co-endorsement with Bank)
- Pend Oreille County Democratic Party

Unions

- National Education Association
- Washington State Labor Council (co-endorsement with Maycumber)
Brian Dansel (R)

Political parties

- Spokane County Republican Party
- Washington State Republican Party
Jacquelin Maycumber (R)

State legislators

- Mary Dye, state representative from the 9th district (2015–present)

County officials

- Ozzie Knezovich, former Spokane County sheriff (2006–2022)

Unions

- International Association of Fire Fighters
- Washington State Labor Council (co-endorsement with Conroy)
Cathy McMorris Rodgers (R) (withdrawn)

Organizations

- Maggie's List
Declined to endorse

U.S. representatives

- Cathy McMorris Rodgers, incumbent U.S. representative (primary only)

==== Fundraising ====
Campaign finance reports as of December 31, 2024
Candidate	Raised	Spent	Cash on hand
Michael Baumgartner (R)	$1,505,190	$1,323,625	$191,565
Carmela Conroy (D)	$604,595	$591,454	$13,142
Bernadine Bank (D)*	$350,038 (Note: $1,249 of this total was self-funded by Bank.)	$350,123	$0
Jacquelin Maycumber (R)*	$341,903 (Note: $15,627 of this total was self-funded by Maycumber.)	$341,903	$0
Ann Marie Danimus (D)*	$211,482 (Note: $9,956 of this total was self-funded by Danimus.)	$211,950	$23
Brian Dansel (R)*	$122,661	$115,561	$1,521
Matthew Welde (D)*	$30,035 (Note: $2,774 of this total was self-funded by Welde.)	$30,035	$0
Jonathan Bingle (R)*	$22,243	$22,167	$76
Bobbi Bennett-Wolcott (D)*	$8,186	$5,249	$2,937
Cathy McMorris Rodgers (R)^{†}	$3,631,602	$4,670,285	$73,010
Terri Cooper (R)^{†}	$47,829	$36,829	$11,000
John Guenther (R)^{†}	$8,368	$8,368	$0
Source: Federal Election Commission

* Did not advance to the general election

^{†} Did not file for the primary election

==== Debates ====
2024 WA-5 primary election debate
No.	Date	Host	Moderator	Link	Republican	Republican	Republican	Republican	Republican	Republican	Democratic	Democratic	Democratic	Democratic	Democratic
Key: P Participant A Absent N Not invited NP Not invited, participated anyway W Withdrawn															
Key: P Participant A Absent N Not invited NP Not invited, participated anyway W Withdrawn					Michael Baumgartner	Jonathan Bingle	Brian Dansel	Rick Flynn	Jacquelin Maycumber	Rene' Holaday	Bernadine Bank	Bobbi Bennett-Wolcott	Carmela Conroy	Ann Marie Danimus	Matthew Welde
1	June 3, 2024	Washington Indivisible Network	Louis Charboneau	TVW	D	D	D	P	D	P	P	D	P	P	P
2	June 4, 2024	Northwest Passages; KPBX-FM	Emry Dinman; Nate Sanford	YouTube	P	P	P	N	P	NP (Note: Holaday was not invited, but threatened to storm and disrupt the debate if she was not allowed in, prompting Northwest Passages to allow her to participate.)	P	N	P	P	P
	August 6, 2024	Primary elections held													
3	September 24, 2024	Whitman College	Samuel Kabot	Vimeo	P	N	N	N	N	N	N	N	P	N	N
4	October 3, 2024	Spokane Rotary Club	N/A	Rotary Spokane	P	N	N	N	N	N	N	N	W	N	N
5	October 8, 2024	Northwest Passages	Emry Dinman	YouTube	P	N	N	N	N	N	N	N	P	N	N
6	October 21, 2024	Washington State University Foley Institute; KHQ-TV	Morgan Ashley; Cornell Clayton	YouTube	P	N	N	N	N	N	N	N	P	N	N
7	October 30, 2024	KREM (TV)	Whitney Ward; Mark Hanrahan	YouTube	P	N	N	N	N	N	N	N	P	N	N

==== Results ====
Results by county Baumgartner: 30–40%; 20–30%; Maycumber: 30–40%; 20–30%; Dansel: 20–30%

Blanket primary results
Party	Candidate	Votes	%
Republican	Michael Baumgartner	55,859	27.5
Democratic	Carmela Conroy	37,227	18.3
Republican	Jacquelin Maycumber	27,717	13.6
Democratic	Bernadine Bank	24,111	11.9
Republican	Brian Dansel	21,983	10.8
Democratic	Ann Marie Danimus	11,306	5.6
Republican	Jonathan Bingle	7,510	3.7
Republican	Rene Holaday	6,180	3.0
Republican	Rick Flynn	4,822	2.4
Democratic	Matthew Welde	4,183	2.1
Democratic	Bobbi Bennett-Wolcott	2,336	1.1
Write-in		175	0.1
Total votes		203,409	100.0

=== General election ===
==== Predictions ====
Source	Ranking	As of
The Cook Political Report	Solid R	February 2, 2023
Inside Elections	Solid R	September 15, 2023
Sabato's Crystal Ball	Safe R	February 23, 2023
Elections Daily	Safe R	September 7, 2023
CNalysis	Solid R	November 16, 2023

==== Results ====
2024 Washington's 5th congressional district election
Party	Candidate	Votes	%
Republican	Michael Baumgartner	240,619	60.6
Democratic	Carmela Conroy	156,074	39.3
Write-in		593	0.1
Total votes		397,286	100.0
Republican hold			

==== By county ====
County results
County	Michael Baumgartner Republican		Carmela Conroy Democratic		Write-in Various		Margin		Total votes
County	#	%	#	%	#	%	#	%	Total votes
Adams (part)	2,034	83.36%	401	16.43%	5	0.20%	1,633	66.93%	2,440
Asotin	7,458	67.21%	3,620	32.62%	19	0.17%	3,838	34.59%	11,097
Columbia	1,857	76.33%	573	23.55%	3	0.12%	1,284	52.77%	2,433
Ferry	2,851	70.43%	1,194	29.50%	3	0.07%	1,657	40.93%	4,048
Franklin (part)	2,680	83.00%	548	16.97%	1	0.03%	2,132	66.03%	3,229
Garfield	1,081	79.90%	272	20.10%	0	0.00%	809	59.79%	1,353
Lincoln	5,609	79.43%	1,442	20.42%	11	0.16%	4,167	59.01%	7,062
Pend Oreille	6,109	72.88%	2,262	26.99%	11	0.13%	3,847	45.90%	8,382
Spokane	162,591	57.88%	117,853	41.96%	452	0.16%	44,738	15.93%	280,896
Stevens	20,984	75.48%	6,761	24.32%	56	0.20%	14,223	51.16%	27,801
Walla Walla	17,178	59.43%	11,712	40.52%	13	0.04%	5,466	18.91%	28,903
Whitman	10,187	51.86%	9,436	48.04%	19	0.10%	751	3.82%	19,642
Totals	240,619	60.57%	156,074	39.29%	593	0.15%	84,545	21.28%	397,286

== District 6 ==
2024 Washington's 6th congressional district election
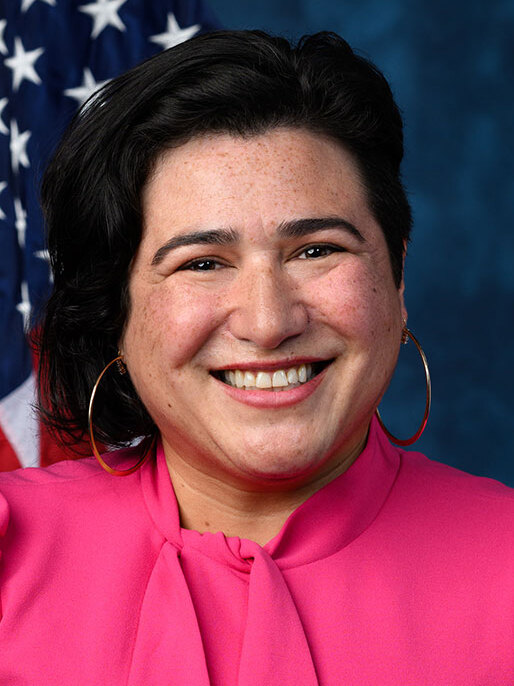

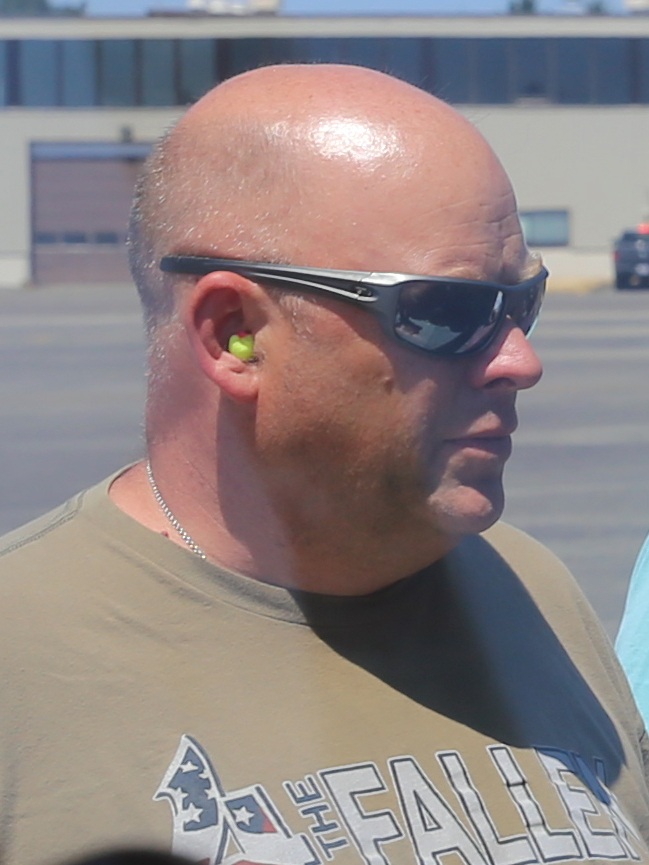
Nominee	Emily Randall	Drew MacEwen
Party	Democratic	Republican
Popular vote	239,687	182,182
Percentage	56.7%	43.1%
- Randall: 50–60% 60–70% 70–80% 80–90% >90% MacEwen: 50–60% 60–70% 70–80% 80–90% >90% Tie: 40–50% No votes
U.S. Representative before election
Derek Kilmer
Democratic
Elected U.S. Representative
Emily Randall
Democratic

The incumbent was Democrat Derek Kilmer, who was re-elected with 60.0% of the vote in 2022. On November 9, 2023, he announced that he would not seek re-election in 2024 after serving 6 terms.

=== Candidates ===
==== Advanced to general ====
- Drew MacEwen (Republican), state senator (2023–present)
- Emily Randall (Democratic), state senator (2019–present)

==== Eliminated in primary ====
- Janis Clark (Republican), nonprofit executive
- Hilary Franz (Democratic), Washington State Commissioner of Public Lands (2017–present) (previously filed to run for Governor)
- Graham Ralston (Independent), attorney

==== Withdrawn ====
- Kate Dean (Democratic), Jefferson County commissioner

==== Declined ====
- Derek Kilmer (Democratic), incumbent U.S. representative (endorsed Franz)
- Ryan Mello (Democratic), Pierce County councilor (endorsed Franz)
- Christine Rolfes (Democratic), Kitsap County commissioner and former state senator (endorsed Franz)
- Victoria Woodards (Democratic), mayor of Tacoma (endorsed Franz)

=== Endorsements ===
Hilary Franz (D)

Federal officials

- Norm Dicks, former U.S. representative for this district (1977–2013)
- Derek Kilmer, incumbent U.S. representative for this district

State legislators

- Brian Blake, former state representative
- Mike Chapman, state representative
- Dean Takko, former state senator

Local officials

- Christine Rolfes, Kitsap County commissioner and former state senator
- Victoria Woodards, mayor of Tacoma

Tribes

- Puyallup Tribal Council

Organizations

- National Organization for Women PAC
- National Women's Political Caucus (co-endorsement with Randall)

Labor unions

- IUPAT DC5
- Joint Council of Teamsters No. 28

Newspapers

- The Seattle Times
Drew MacEwen (R)

Organizations

- Mainstream Republicans of Washington
- Washington Association of Police Organizations
- Washington Farm Bureau
- Washington Retail Federation
Emily Randall (D)

U.S. senators

- Patty Murray, Washington (1993–present)

State officials

- Christine Gregoire, former governor of Washington (2005–2013)
- Steve Hobbs, Washington Secretary of State (2021–present)
- Gary Locke, former governor of Washington (1997–2005)

U.S. representatives

- Marie Gluesenkamp Perez, WA-03 (2023–present)
- Katie Porter, CA-47 (2019–present)
- Linda Sánchez, CA-38 (2003–present)
- Marilyn Strickland, WA-10 (2021–present)
- Mark Takano, CA-39 (2013–present)
- Ritchie Torres, NY-15 (2021–present)

State legislators

- Andy Billig, Majority Leader of the Washington Senate
- Karen Keiser, state senator
- Marko Liias, state senator
- Joe Nguyen, state senator
- T'wina Nobles, state senator

Political parties

- Pierce County Democratic Party

Organizations

- CHC BOLD PAC
- Equality PAC
- Everytown for Gun Safety (post-primary)
- Human Rights Campaign
- Latino Victory Fund
- LGBTQ Victory Fund
- LPAC
- National Women's Political Caucus (co-endorsement with Franz)
- Planned Parenthood Action Fund
- PODER PAC

Labor unions

- Sheet Metal Workers Local 66
- Washington State Labor Council

Newspapers

- The News Tribune
Derek Kilmer (D) (declined to run)

Organizations

- Population Connection Action Fund

=== Fundraising ===
Campaign finance reports as of December 31, 2024
Candidate	Raised	Spent	Cash on hand
Emily Randall (D)	$1,978,943 (Note: $1,000 of this total was self-funded by Randall.)	$1,951,071	$27,872
Drew MacEwen (R)	$255,579	$255,579	$0
Hilary Franz (D)*	$1,531,302 (Note: $6,600 of this total was self-funded by Franz.)	$1,531,302	$0
Janis Clark (R)*	$0	$0	$0
Derek Kilmer (D)^{†}	$1,012,529	$1,522,806	$638,923
Kate Dean (R)^{†}	$22,583	$22,583	$0
Elizabeth Kreiselmaier (R)^{†}	$253	$7,908	$1,365
Source: Federal Election Commission

* Did not advance to the general election

^{†} Did not file for the primary election

=== Polling ===
Poll source	Date(s) administered	Sample size	Margin of error	Hilary Franz (D)	Drew MacEwen (R)	Emily Randall (D)	Undecided
Upswing Research (Note: Poll sponsored by Randall's campaign)	April 16–19, 2024	300 (LV)	± 4.9%	21%	34%	19%	26%

==== Results ====
Results by county Randall: 30–40% 40–50%; MacEwen: 30–40% 40–50%

Blanket primary results
Party	Candidate	Votes	%
Democratic	Emily Randall	80,249	34.3
Republican	Drew MacEwen	70,513	30.2
Democratic	Hilary Franz	57,824	24.7
Republican	Janis Clark	17,665	7.6
Independent	Graham Ralston	7,235	3.1
Write-in		188	0.1
Total votes		233,674	100.0

=== General election ===
==== Predictions ====
Source	Ranking	As of
The Cook Political Report	Solid D	February 2, 2023
Inside Elections	Solid D	September 15, 2023
Sabato's Crystal Ball	Safe D	February 23, 2023
Elections Daily	Safe D	September 7, 2023
CNalysis	Solid D	November 16, 2023

==== Results ====
2024 Washington's 6th congressional district election
Party	Candidate	Votes	%
Democratic	Emily Randall	239,687	56.7
Republican	Drew MacEwen	182,182	43.1
Write-in		753	0.2
Total votes		422,622	100.0
Democratic hold			

==== By county ====
County results
County	Emily Randall Democratic		Drew MacEwen Republican		Write-in Various		Margin		Total votes
County	#	%	#	%	#	%	#	%	Total votes
Clallam	24,222	51.78%	22,492	48.08%	64	0.14%	1,730	3.70%	46,778
Grays Harbor	16,523	45.40%	19,752	54.28%	117	0.32%	-3,229	-8.87%	36,392
Jefferson	17,214	70.73%	7,081	29.09%	43	0.18%	10,133	41.63%	24,338
Kitsap	87,554	57.39%	64,757	42.45%	252	0.17%	22,797	14.94%	152,563
Mason	15,468	43.79%	19,794	56.04%	62	0.18%	-4,326	-12.25%	35,324
Pierce (part)	78,706	61.86%	48,306	37.97%	215	0.17%	30,400	23.89%	127,227
Totals	239,687	56.71%	182,182	43.11%	753	0.18%	57,505	13.61%	422,622

== District 7 ==
2024 Washington's 7th congressional district election
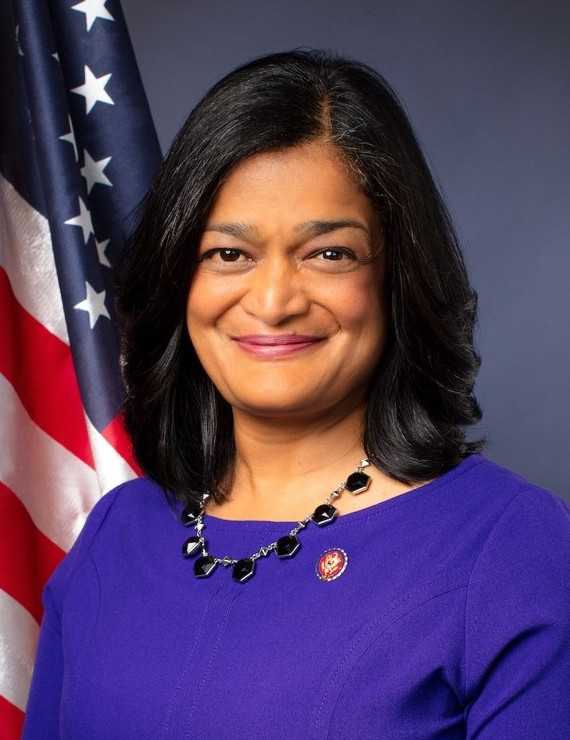

Nominee	Pramila Jayapal	Dan Alexander
Party	Democratic	Republican
Popular vote	352,286	66,220
Percentage	83.9%	15.8%
- Jayapal: 50–60% 60–70% 70–80% 80–90% >90%
U.S. Representative before election
Pramila Jayapal
Democratic
Elected U.S. Representative
Pramila Jayapal
Democratic

The incumbent was Democrat Pramila Jayapal, who was re-elected with 85.4% of the vote in 2022.

=== Candidates ===
==== Advanced to general ====
- Dan Alexander (Republican)
- Pramila Jayapal (Democratic), incumbent U.S. representative

==== Eliminated in primary ====
- Liz Hallock (Democratic), attorney and perennial candidate
- Cliff Moon (Republican), software engineer and runner-up for this district in 2022

=== Endorsements ===
Pramila Jayapal (D)

Organizations

- Bend the Arc
- End Citizens United
- Feminist Majority PAC
- Friends of the Earth Action
- Fuse Washington
- Giffords
- Humane Society Legislative Fund
- Justice Democrats
- League of Conservation Voters
- National Women's Political Caucus
- Natural Resources Defense Council
- Peace Action
- Planned Parenthood Action Fund
- Population Connection Action Fund

Labor unions

- Association of Flight Attendants
- International Federation of Professional and Technical Engineers
- National Education Association
- National Nurses United
- National Union of Healthcare Workers
- United Auto Workers
- Washington State Labor Council

Newspapers

- The Seattle Times
- The Stranger

=== Fundraising ===
Campaign finance reports as of December 31, 2024
Candidate	Raised	Spent	Cash on hand
Pramila Jayapal (D)	$2,824,206	$3,181302	$2,012,725
Dan Alexander (R)	Did not File		
Cliff Moon (R)*	$0	$6,022	$0
Source: Federal Election Commission

* Did not advance to the general election

==== Results ====
Results by county Jayapal: 70–80%

Blanket primary results
Party	Candidate	Votes	%
Democratic	Pramila Jayapal (incumbent)	174,019	79.9
Republican	Dan Alexander	16,902	7.8
Democratic	Liz Hallock	16,494	7.6
Republican	Cliff Moon	10,070	4.6
Write-in		409	0.2
Total votes		217,894	100.0

=== General election ===
==== Predictions ====
Source	Ranking	As of
The Cook Political Report	Solid D	February 2, 2023
Inside Elections	Solid D	September 15, 2023
Sabato's Crystal Ball	Safe D	February 23, 2023
Elections Daily	Safe D	September 7, 2023
CNalysis	Solid D	November 16, 2023

==== Results ====
2024 Washington's 7th congressional district election
Party	Candidate	Votes	%
Democratic	Pramila Jayapal (incumbent)	352,286	83.9
Republican	Dan Alexander	66,220	15.8
Write-in		1,313	0.3
Total votes		419,819	100.0
Democratic hold			

==== By county ====
County results
County	Pramila Jayapal Democratic		Dan Alexander Republican		Write-in Various		Margin		Total votes
County	#	%	#	%	#	%	#	%	Total votes
King (part)	352,286	83.91%	66,220	15.77%	1,313	0.31%	286,066	68.14%	419,819
Totals	352,286	83.91%	66,220	15.77%	1,313	0.31%	286,066	68.14%	419,819

== District 8 ==
2024 Washington's 8th congressional district election
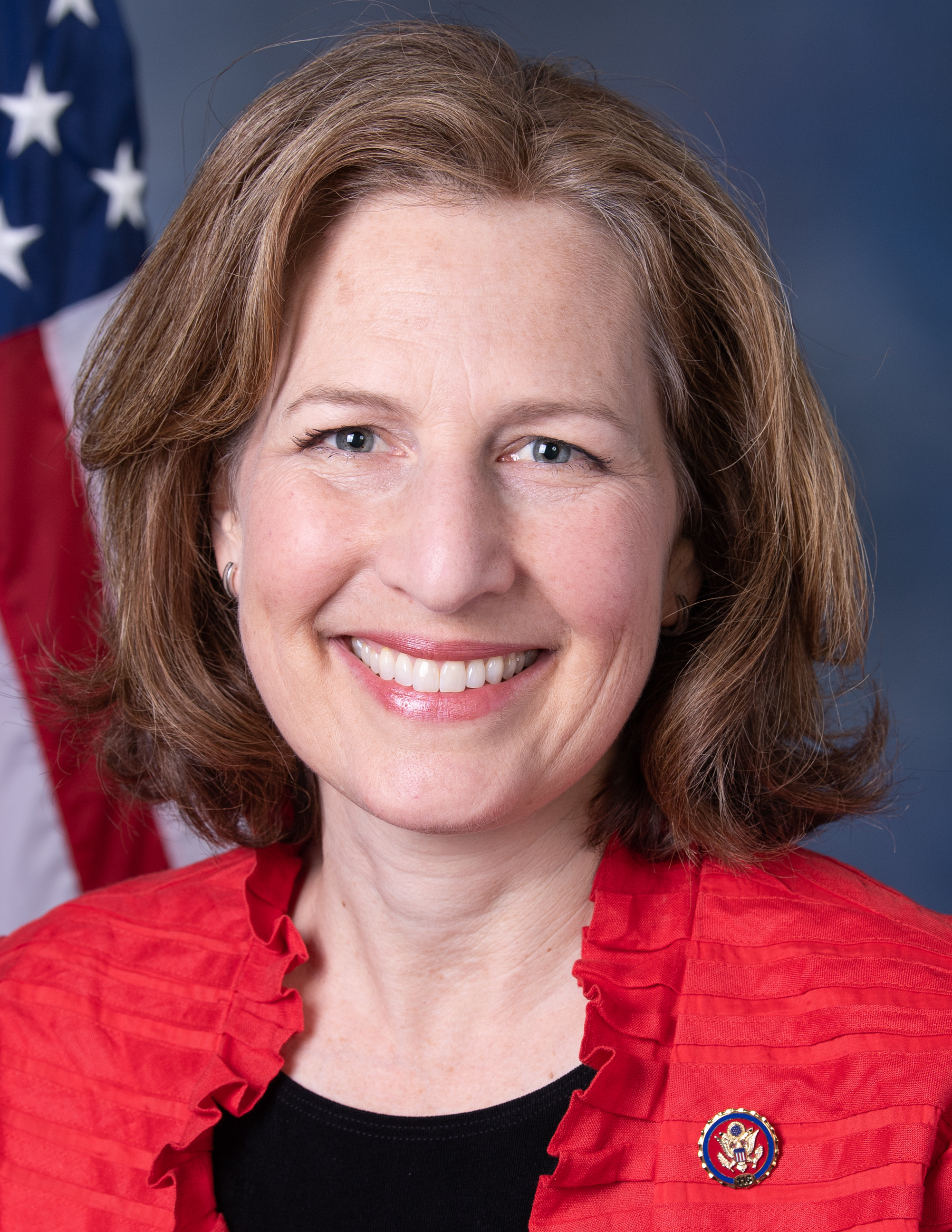

Nominee	Kim Schrier	Carmen Goers
Party	Democratic	Republican
Popular vote	224,607	190,675
Percentage	54.0%	45.8%
- Schrier: 50–60% 60–70% 70–80% 80–90% >90% Goers: 40–50% 50–60% 60–70% 70–80% 80–90% >90% Tie: 50% No votes
U.S. Representative before election
Kim Schrier
Democratic
Elected U.S. Representative
Kim Schrier
Democratic

The incumbent was Democrat Kim Schrier, who was re-elected with 53.3% of the vote in 2022.

=== Candidates ===
==== Advanced to general ====
- Carmen Goers (Republican), banker
- Kim Schrier (Democratic), incumbent U.S. representative

==== Eliminated in primary ====
- Keith Arnold (Democratic), accounting technician and perennial candidate
- Imraan Siddiqui (Democratic), Washington director for the Council on American-Islamic Relations

==== Withdrawn ====
- Nirav Sheth (Republican), restaurant owner (switched to the 10th congressional district)

=== Endorsements ===
Kim Schrier (D)

Organizations

- 314 Action
- Brady PAC
- Democratic Majority for Israel
- EMILY's List
- End Citizens United
- Everytown for Gun Safety Action Fund
- Feminist Majority PAC
- Giffords
- Humane Society Legislative Fund
- J Street PAC
- Jewish Democratic Council of America
- Joint Action Committee for Political Affairs
- League of Conservation Voters
- NARAL Pro-Choice America
- National Women's Political Caucus
- Planned Parenthood Action Fund
- Population Connection Action Fund
- Vote Mama

Labor unions

- National Education Association
- Washington State Labor Council

Newspapers

- The News Tribune
- The Seattle Times
Imraan Siddiqui (D)

Newspapers

- The Stranger

=== Fundraising ===
Campaign finance reports as of December 31, 2024
Candidate	Raised	Spent	Cash on hand
Kim Schrier (D)	$6,530,379	$5,059,146	$1,821,623
Carmen Goers (R)	$258,745 (Note: $104,218 of this total was self-funded by Goers.)	$258,496	$249
Imraan Siddiqi (D)*	$433,720	$433,720	$0
Source: Federal Election Commission

* Did not advance to the general election

==== Results ====
Results by county Schrier: 50–60%; Goers: 50–60%

Blanket primary results
Party	Candidate	Votes	%
Democratic	Kim Schrier (incumbent)	105,069	50.1
Republican	Carmen Goers	94,322	45.0
Democratic	Imraan Siddiqi	7,374	3.5
Democratic	Keith Arnold	2,603	1.2
Write-in		291	0.1
Total votes		209,659	100.0

=== General election ===
==== Predictions ====
Source	Ranking	As of
The Cook Political Report	Likely D	February 2, 2023
Inside Elections	Solid D	August 29, 2024
Sabato's Crystal Ball	Likely D	June 5, 2024
Elections Daily	Likely D	September 7, 2023
CNalysis	Very Likely D	June 15, 2024
RealClearPolitics	Lean D	November 1, 2024

==== Results ====
2024 Washington's 8th congressional district election
Party	Candidate	Votes	%
Democratic	Kim Schrier (incumbent)	224,607	54.0
Republican	Carmen Goers	190,675	45.8
Write-in		995	0.2
Total votes		416,277	100.0
Democratic hold			

==== By county ====
County results
County	Kim Schrier Democratic		Carmen Goers Republican		Write-in Various		Margin		Total votes
County	#	%	#	%	#	%	#	%	Total votes
Chelan	20,000	48.22%	21,383	51.55%	94	0.23%	-1,383	-3.33%	41,477
Douglas (part)	152	41.64%	213	58.36%	0	0.00%	-61	-16.71%	365
King (part)	138,314	62.71%	81,617	37.01%	614	0.28%	56,697	25.71%	220,545
Kittitas	11,803	45.58%	14,032	54.19%	61	0.24%	-2,229	-8.61%	25,896
Pierce (part)	38,831	41.94%	53,611	57.90%	153	0.17%	-14,780	-15.96%	92,595
Snohomish (part)	15,507	43.81%	19,819	55.99%	73	0.21%	-4,312	-12.18%	35,399
Totals	224,607	53.96%	190,675	45.80%	995	0.24%	33,932	8.15%	416,277

== District 9 ==
2024 Washington's 9th congressional district election
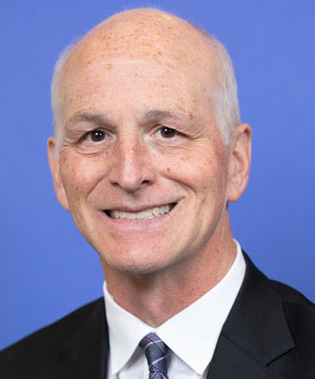

Nominee	Adam Smith	Melissa Chaudhry
Party	Democratic	Democratic
Popular vote	182,780	90,601
Percentage	65.4%	32.4%
- Smith: 40–50% 50–60% 60–70% 70–80% 80–90% Chaudhry: 40–50% 50–60% 60–70% Tie: 40–50% No votes
U.S. Representative before election
Adam Smith
Democratic
Elected U.S. Representative
Adam Smith
Democratic

The incumbent was Democrat Adam Smith, who was re-elected with 71.6% of the vote in 2022.

=== Candidates ===
==== Advanced to general ====
- Melissa Chaudhry (Democratic), nonprofit grant writer
- Adam Smith (Democratic), incumbent U.S. representative

==== Eliminated in primary ====
- Mark Greene (Republican), paralegal, perennial candidate, and Democratic nominee for Alaska's at-large congressional district in 2000 and 2002
- David Ishii (Bipartisan), retired postal worker and perennial candidate
- Paul Martin (Republican), network engineer

=== Endorsements ===
Melissa Chaudhry (D)

Newspapers

- The Stranger
Adam Smith (D)

Organizations

- Humane Society Legislative Fund
- J Street PAC
- Population Connection Action Fund

Labor unions

- International Federation of Professional and Technical Engineers
- National Education Association
- Washington State Labor Council

Newspapers

- The Seattle Times

=== Fundraising ===
Campaign finance reports as of December 31, 2024
Candidate	Raised	Spent	Cash on hand
Adam Smith (D)	$1,677,916	$1,701,114	$570,753
Melissa Chaudhry (D)	$277,468	$108,983	$118,484
Paul Martin (R)*	$1,825	$1,161	$664
Mark Greene (R)*	$0	$0	$0
David Ishii (O)*	$0	$0	$0
Source: Federal Election Commission

* Did not advance to the general election

==== Results ====
Results by county Smith: 50–60%

Blanket primary results
Party	Candidate	Votes	%
Democratic	Adam Smith (incumbent)	78,761	53.8
Democratic	Melissa Chaudhry	30,229	20.7
Republican	Paul Martin	26,646	18.2
Republican	Mark Greene	9,459	6.5
Bipartisan	David Ishii	963	0.7
Write-in		248	0.2
Total votes		146,306	100.0

=== General election ===
==== Predictions ====
Source	Ranking	As of
The Cook Political Report	Solid D	February 2, 2023
Inside Elections	Solid D	September 15, 2023
Sabato's Crystal Ball	Safe D	February 23, 2023
Elections Daily	Safe D	September 7, 2023
CNalysis	Solid D	November 16, 2023

==== Results ====
2024 Washington's 9th congressional district election
Party	Candidate	Votes	%
Democratic	Adam Smith (incumbent)	182,780	65.4
Democratic	Melissa Chaudhry	90,601	32.4
Write-in		5,917	2.1
Total votes		279,298	100.0
Democratic hold			

==== By county ====
County results
County	Adam Smith Democratic		Melissa Chaudhry Democratic		Write-in Various		Margin		Total votes
County	#	%	#	%	#	%	#	%	Total votes
King (part)	182,780	65.44%	90,601	32.44%	5,917	2.12%	92,179	33.00%	279,298
Totals	182,780	65.44%	90,601	32.44%	5,917	2.12%	92,179	33.00%	279,298

== District 10 ==
2024 Washington's 10th congressional district election
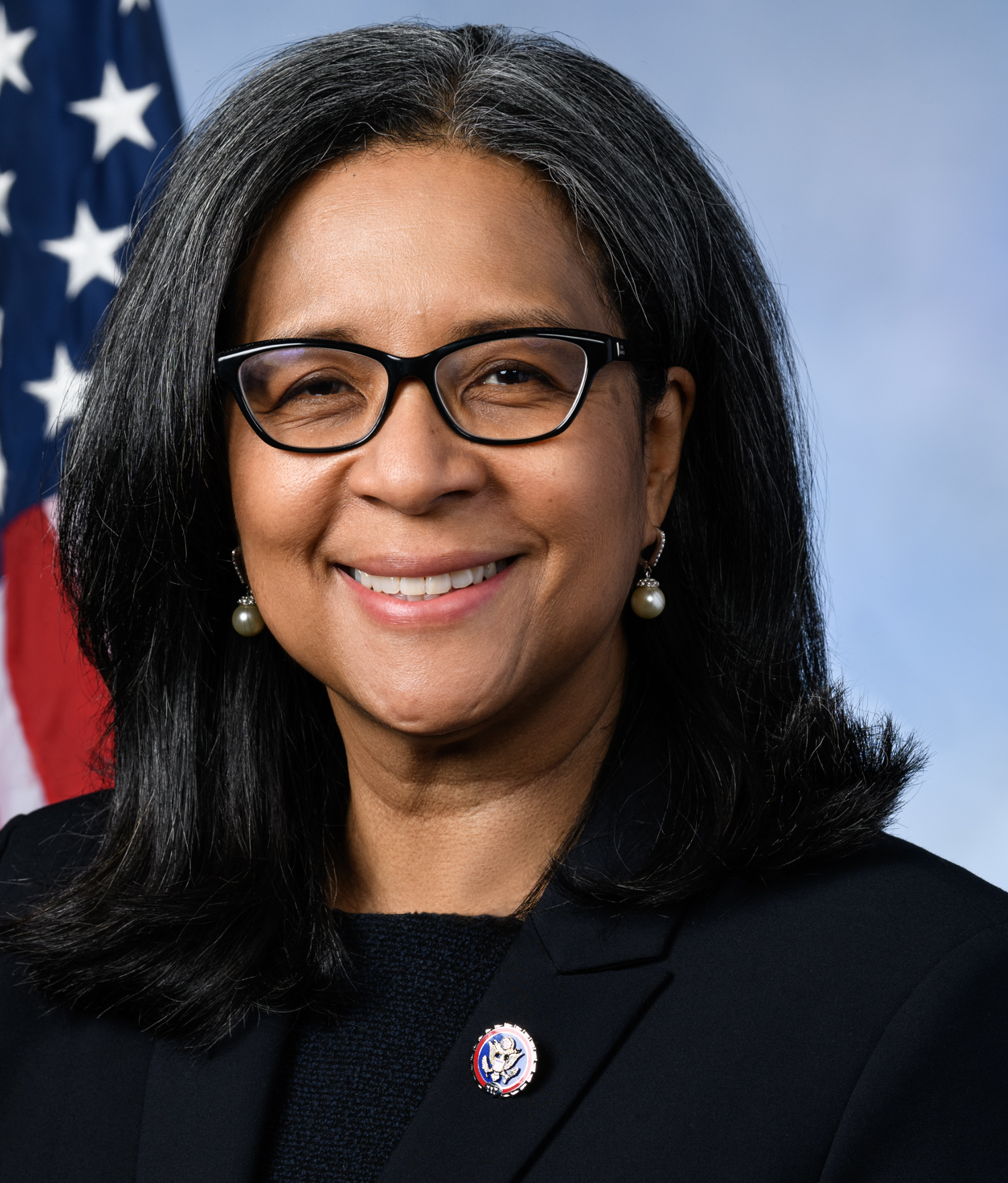

Nominee	Marilyn Strickland	Don Hewett
Party	Democratic	Republican
Popular vote	203,732	143,492
Percentage	58.5%	41.2%
- Strickland: 40–50% 50–60% 60–70% 70–80% 80–90% >90% Hewett: 50–60% 60–70% 70–80% 80–90% >90% Tie: 50% No votes
U.S. Representative before election
Marilyn Strickland
Democratic
Elected U.S. Representative
Marilyn Strickland
Democratic

The incumbent was Democrat Marilyn Strickland, who was re-elected with 57.0% of the vote in 2022.

=== Candidates ===
==== Advanced to general ====
- Don Hewett (Republican), electrical engineer and candidate for this district in 2020 and 2022
- Marilyn Strickland (Democratic), incumbent U.S. representative

==== Eliminated in primary ====
- Richard Boyce (Congress Sucks), retiree and candidate for this district in 2016, 2020 and 2022
- Kurtis Engle (Union), U.S. Navy veteran and candidate for secretary of state in 2022
- Eric Mahaffy (Democratic), blue collar worker and candidate for this district in 2022
- Nirav Sheth (Republican), restaurant owner
- Desirée Toliver (Democratic), Thurston County Democratic Party executive committee member

=== Endorsements ===
Marilyn Strickland (D)

Organizations

- AIPAC
- Democratic Majority for Israel
- Humane Society Legislative Fund
- League of Conservation Voters
- National Women's Political Caucus
- Planned Parenthood Action Fund
- Population Connection Action Fund
- Pro-Israel America

Labor unions

- National Education Association
- Washington State Labor Council

Newspapers

- The News Tribune
- The Seattle Times

=== Fundraising ===
Campaign finance reports as of December 31, 2024
Candidate	Raised	Spent	Cash on hand
Marilyn Strickland (D)	$2,067,308	$1,944,673	$580,588
Don Hewett (R)	$40	$0	$40
Nirav Sheth (R)*	$26,855	$30,401	$3,758
Desirée Toliver (D)*	$3,372	$2,298	$1,075
Eric Mahaffy (D)*	$0	$0	$0
Jay Fratt (R)^{†}	$14,932	$14,932	$0
Source: Federal Election Commission

* Did not advance to the general election

^{†} Did not file for the primary election

=== Results ===
Results by county Strickland: 50–60%

Blanket primary results
Party	Candidate	Votes	%
Democratic	Marilyn Strickland (incumbent)	93,942	54.3
Republican	Don Hewett	46,258	26.7
Republican	Nirav Sheth	20,208	11.7
Democratic	Desirée Toliver	6,424	3.7
Democratic	Eric Mahaffy	3,527	2.0
Congress Sucks	Richard Boyce	2,056	1.2
Union	Kurtis Engle	545	0.3
Write-in		192	0.1
Total votes		173,152	100.0

=== General election ===
==== Predictions ====
Source	Ranking	As of
The Cook Political Report	Solid D	February 2, 2023
Inside Elections	Solid D	September 15, 2023
Sabato's Crystal Ball	Safe D	February 23, 2023
Elections Daily	Safe D	September 7, 2023
CNalysis	Solid D	November 16, 2023

=== Results ===
2024 Washington's 10th congressional district election
Party	Candidate	Votes	%
Democratic	Marilyn Strickland (incumbent)	203,732	58.5
Republican	Don Hewett	143,492	41.2
Write-in		820	0.2
Total votes		348,044	100.0
Democratic hold			

==== By county ====
County results
County	Marilyn Strickland Democratic		Don Hewett Republican		Write-in Various		Margin		Total votes
County	#	%	#	%	#	%	#	%	Total votes
Pierce (part)	115,011	55.82%	90,610	43.98%	408	0.20%	24,401	11.84%	206,029
Thurston (part)	88,721	62.47%	52,882	37.24%	412	0.29%	35,839	25.24%	142,015
Totals	203,723	58.54%	143,492	41.23%	820	0.24%	60,231	17.31%	348,044

== Notes ==
Partisan clients
