= Luc Jasmin III =

American politician

Member-elect of the Washington House of Representatives from the 3rd district
- Assuming office January 2027
- Succeeding: Timm Ormsby

Personal details
- Party: Democratic

Luc Jasmin III is an American politician. A member of the Democratic Party, he is the member-elect for the 3rd district of the Washington House of Representatives.
