= Senator Rand =

Senator Rand may refer to:

- Anne Rand (born 1946), Maine State Senate
- John L. Rand (1861–1942), Oregon State Senate
- Rick Rand (born 1957), Kentucky State Senate
- Tony Rand (born 1939), North Carolina State Senate
- Walter Rand (1919–1995), New Jersey State Senate
- E. M. Rands (1856–1922), Washington State Senate

== See also ==
- Rand Paul (born 1963), U.S. Senator from Kentucky since 2011
