= Margaret Leonard =

American tax consultant and politician from Washington

Member of the Washington House of Representatives from the 3rd, Position 2 district
- In office January 3, 1981 – January 3, 1983
- Preceded by: William J.S. May
- Succeeded by: Dennis Dellwo

Personal details
- Born: May 27, 1916 Thorp, Washington
- Died: March 10, 2004 (aged 87) Spokane, Washington
- Party: Republican
- Occupation: Tax consultant, Politician
- Known for: First woman elected to the city council of Spokane, Washington

Margaret Leonard (May 27, 1916 – March 10, 2004) was an American tax consultant and politician from Washington. Leonard was a former Republican member of Washington House of Representatives for District 3, from 1981 to 1983.

== Early life ==
On May 27, 1916, Leonard was born in Thorp, Washington.

== Education ==
Leonard attended University of Washington and the Ellensburg Normal School.

== Career ==
In 1967, Leonard was the first woman elected to the city council of Spokane, Washington, where she served until 1977. In 1969, she narrowly defeated James Everett Chase, who would go on to become both the first African American member of the city council and also the first African American mayor of Spokane.

On November 4, 1980, Leonard won the election and became a Republican member of Washington House of Representatives for District 3, Position 2. Leonard defeated William J.S. May with 50.26% of the votes.

== Personal life ==
On March 10, 2004, Leonard died in Spokane, Washington.
