= Bernard Gallagher (disambiguation) =

Bernard Gallagher (1929–2016) was a British actor.

Bernard Gallagher may also refer to:

- Bernard J. Gallagher (1912–1995), American politician in state of Washington
- Bernard David Gallagher (1925–2003), Canadian politician in Saskatchewan
- Benny Gallagher (born 1945), Scottish musician

== See also ==
- Bernard Gallacher (born 1949), Scottish former golfer
- Bernie Gallacher (1967–2011), Scottish footballer
