= Agnes Kehoe =

American politician (1874–1959)

Member of the Washington House of Representatives from the 3rd district
- In office 1939–1947

Personal details
- Born: 1874 Iowa
- Died: November 17, 1959 (aged 84–85) Spokane, Washington
- Party: Democratic

Agnes M. Kehoe (1874 – November 17, 1959) was an American politician. She was a Democrat, who represented District 3 in the Washington House of Representatives which included parts of Spokane County, from 1939 to 1947.

== Political career ==
Agnes Kehoe was born on a farm near Mason City, Iowa. Kehoe was owner of a Hillyard hardware store and civic activist. At the time of the Great Depression, a group of Democrats and Republicans urged Kehoe to run for the state government. She resisted from doing so largely because her husband felt that "a woman’s place was in the home". At the time of her election she was one of only eight women in the 145-member legislature. Kehoe served four terms in the legislature. She resigned following her husband's death in 1947. Holy Names College recognized her contributions to the neighbourhood of Hillyard in 1951 with the Marian Award.
