= Augustus High =

American politician

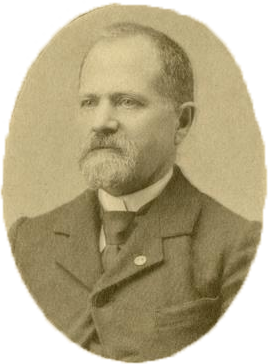
- High in 1899

President pro tempore of the Washington Senate
- In office January 9, 1899 – January 14, 1901
- Preceded by: W. H. Plummer
- Succeeded by: Joseph George Megler

Member of the Washington Senate from the 13th district
- In office January 11, 1897 – January 14, 1901
- Preceded by: B. F. Shaw
- Succeeded by: E. M. Rands

Personal details
- Born: September 7, 1844 Columbia, Pennsylvania, U.S.
- Died: September 22, 1927 (aged 83) Vancouver, Washington, U.S.
- Party: Democratic (1899–1927)
- Other political affiliations: Populist (until 1899)

Augustus High (September 7, 1844 – September 22, 1927) was an American politician in the state of Washington. He served in the Washington State Senate from 1897 to 1901. From 1899 to 1901, he was president pro tempore of the Senate.
