= Margaret Hurley (Washington politician) =

American politician (1909–2015)

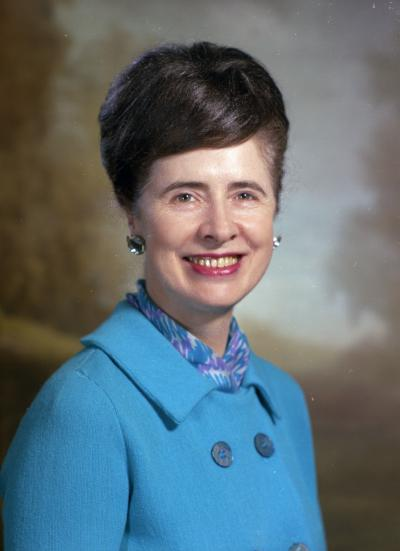
- Hurley in 1967

Member of the Washington House of Representatives for the 3rd district
- In office 1953–1979

Member of the Washington State Senate for the 3rd district
- In office 1979–1984
- Preceded by: Katherine Reid
- Succeeded by: Lois Stratton

Personal details
- Born: Margaret Ellen Morse; September 10, 1909 Winnebago, Minnesota, U.S.
- Died: August 29, 2015 (aged 105) Tacoma, Washington
- Party: Democratic
- Spouse: Joseph E. Hurley (m. 1935; died. 1968)
- Occupation: Teacher

Margaret Ellen Hurley (née Morse; September 10, 1909 – August 29, 2015) was an American politician in the state of Washington. Hurley served in the Washington House of Representatives as a Democrat from the 3rd district from 1953 to 1979, succeeding her husband, Joseph E. Hurley. She served in the Washington State Senate from 1979 to 1984, to replace the unexpired term of Katherine Reid. On both occasions, she was succeeded by Lois Stratton.

== Early life ==
Hurley was born Margaret Ellen Morse on September 10, 1909, in Winnebago, Minnesota. She was the youngest of eight children of David Hall Morse and Margaret Morse. Her mother was second generation Irish Catholic and the children were raised very religiously. When she was two, her father moved the family to Spokane, Washington, where he founded a business that sold lumber and firewood, before the family relocated to an alfalfa and apple farm in the Methow Valley three years later. The farm did not have electricity or running water and the family was often poor. Her brother, Maynard, died when Hurley was ten and a year later, the house burned down when a kerosene lamp blew over. The family relocated to her brother's house while it was rebuilt but her father left for months, leaving the children with their mother.

When Hurley was thirteen, her father sold the farm on the urging of her and her mother and they moved to Spokane so she could attend Holy Names Academy instead of her previous one-room school. She initially felt like an outsider, having moved from the country and having to wait tables in the dining hall to pay her way through school but she excelled academically, becoming an honors student. She was elected class president and in her senior year, she took additional night courses in shorthand and typing but ultimately decided to stay at the school to receive her teacher's certificate after two years, with her sister paying her tuition.

After graduation, she began teaching at the Palouse in Uniontown. Shortly after, she began dating Joseph E. Hurley and when she moved to Lind for work, they continued to travel on weekends to see each other. She worked in a number of small schoolhouses around Spokane before joining the Mead School, where she taught first and second grade. She was also involved with organizing an annual Christmas operetta and a rhythm band. In 1935, she married Hurley but as schools would not employ married women, they kept the marriage a secret for two years until the school ultimately found out. The Mead allowed her to retain her job for one more year, while her husband passed the Washington bar exam and was hired by state senator Fred S. Duggan as a law clerk.

Her husband decided to run for office in the Washington House of Representatives in 1938, contesting the 3rd district as a Democrat, and Hurley ran his campaign. She previously campaigned for judges in Tekoa and Spokane and a candidate for State Supervisor of Public Instruction and had enjoyed it. Her husband won and the couple moved to Olympia, where she ran his successful re-election campaign in 1940, although he chose not run again in 1942. The couple had five children between 1939 and 1947, a daughter who did not survive and then Patrick, John, Steve and Mary Margaret. Their relationship was straining however as her husband developed a drinking problem and then in 1950, chose to return to the state legislature, leaving her to raise the children.

== Political career ==
In 1952, her husband chose not to seek re-election and instead encouraged Hurley to run for office. A family friend agreed to come to Olympia as a live-in babysitter so she agreed and began campaigning on the platform of "A balanced budget without additional taxation". Her sister-in-law, Loretta Little, was also running for the same district, at a time when each district elected two representatives and the women printed joint campaign brochures. Hurley was identified on the ballet as Mrs. Joseph E. Hurley which assisted with name recognition. She won the primary, beating Little, and the general election on November 4, 1952. She was elected alongside incumbent Democrat Bernard J. Gallagher with a margin of 600 votes. Hurley was one of nine female legislators during her first term in office.

She ran for re-election in 1954, finishing first in the general election, and was voted into a state house where the Democrats only held a one vote majority. As her husband was driving the family to Olympia, they were in a head-on collision leading to hospitalization. Hurley had a broken leg but continued to the capital, where she cast the deciding vote to elect John L. O'Brien as Speaker of the House; he gave her his "undying gratitude" in his acceptance speech. After a few weeks off to care for her family, she returned to the legislature where she was named chair of the banks and banking committee and introduced a new bill to require drivers in the state to have mandatory auto insurance as the man who had hit their car did not have enough coverage. Her bill was opposed by the insurance lobby and ultimate failed. During her second term, she was honored for her dedication following the accident and for her work on the budget and taxation, being named Spokane's Outstanding Citizen of the Year by the Central Committee of Civic Clubs.

As her husband's income became increasingly erratic due to his drinking, Hurley returned to university and graduated from Holy Names College in 1959 with a bachelor of arts degree in education. Two years later, she began to teach again, at the Trent School outside of Spokane. Her husband died of cancer in 1968.

Throughout her time in the legislature, she was unwilling to follow the Democratic Party line, voting against their bills if they raised taxes or catered to the interests of the party leaders, who were mostly from Western Washington. On one collective bargaining bill, she ran out of the House chambers to delay the proceedings. Things came to a head in 1963 with the re-election of O'Brien as speaker. He had previously refused to bring her bill, which would have required a public vote before private power companies could be taken over by the government, to a vote. In response, she worked with fellow Democratic legislator William S. Day to assemble a group of eight Democrats who would vote with Republicans to remove O'Brien as speaker in favor of Day. At the re-opening of the legislature on January 14, 1963, O'Brien, a Republican candidate and Day were each nominated as speaker. There were two inconclusive ballots before the Republicans switched their votes with the eight Democrats, leading to Day being elected on the third ballot. Widely considered a coalition session, Hurley was appointed as a floor leader but she was not popular with her party, who would not eat lunch with her. She faced opposition in the Democratic primary but was easily re-elected. She was invited to join the Republican caucus but she declined.

In 1971, she fought against a proposal by the Washington State Department of Transportation to build a north-south freeway through her district. She introduced various bills to block the construction, including a requirement for freeway plans to be submitted to the Department of Ecology to assess air quality and ground pollution impacts, but she found them all countered by opposing bills. She wrote a formal remonstrance in which she alleged that the department was "consuming huge sums of tax money, rooting up whole communities and covering them with concrete and asphalt", although it was ruled to be out of order by the Republican speaker. Her bill passed and the project was delayed by decades, finally breaking ground in 2001, with the route changing to avoid the Hamilton-Nevada street corridor, which she particularly opposed.

=== Washington State Senate ===
She was easily re-elected by her district but, frustrated with fellow Democrats, she considered leaving the House. In 1979, the death of state senator James Keefe led to Hurley contesting the state senate in the 3rd district. She was endorsed by The Spokesman-Review in the 1979 by-election and received 75 percent of the vote on November 6, 1979. She resigned from the House on November 28, 1979. She was re-elected the following year in the general election. In the senate, she became involved with environmental activism as a member of the ecology and energy committees, including opposing clear-cutting. She spoke about a scandal at the Washington Public Power Supply System in Hanford, where whistleblowers had reported dangerous construction and the potential release of radioactive materials. She also opposed the construction of a nuclear waste dump in Hanford, which was never built.

== Later life ==
In 1984, she decided not to run for re-election and left public life, retiring to Spokane. She met Leonard Peterson on a cruise and the couple married in 1991. The stare senate passed resolution 1991-8701 to wish them the best. They were together until Peterson's death in 2012. She moved to a retirement home in Tacoma, where she turned 100 in 2009. She died on August 29, 2015, at the age of 105. She received a number of honors, including the Marian Medal, the highest honor of her alma mater.
