= Lois Stratton =

American politician (1927–2020)

Member of the Washington Senate from the 3rd district
- In office January 14, 1985 – January 11, 1993
- Preceded by: Margaret Hurley
- Succeeded by: John A. Moyer

Member of the Washington House of Representatives from the 3rd district
- In office January 2, 1980 – January 14, 1985
- Preceded by: Margaret Hurley
- Succeeded by: William S. Day Jr.

Personal details
- Born: Lois Jean Stratton; January 5, 1927 Springdale, Washington, U.S.
- Died: September 11, 2020 (aged 93) Spokane, Washington, U.S.
- Party: Democratic
- Spouse: Allen Stratton
- Children: 5 including Karen
- Occupation: secretary

Lois Jean Stratton (January 5, 1927 – September 11, 2020) was an American politician in the state of Washington. Stratton served in the Washington House of Representatives as a Democrat from the 3rd district from 1979 to 1985, succeeding Margaret Hurley. She also served in the Washington State Senate from 1985 to 1993, succeeding Hurley once again. A member of the Spokane Tribe, Stratton was the first female enrolled tribal member in the Washington State Legislature.

== Career ==
She worked as a secretary, and is an alumnus of Kinman Business University.

Stratton unsuccessfully ran for mayor of Spokane in 1993.

== Personal life ==
She was married with five children, including Spokane City Councilmember Karen Stratton.

She died on September 11, 2020, in Spokane, Washington at age 93.

== See also ==
- List of Native American politicians
- Native American women in politics
