= Joseph E. Hurley =

American politician

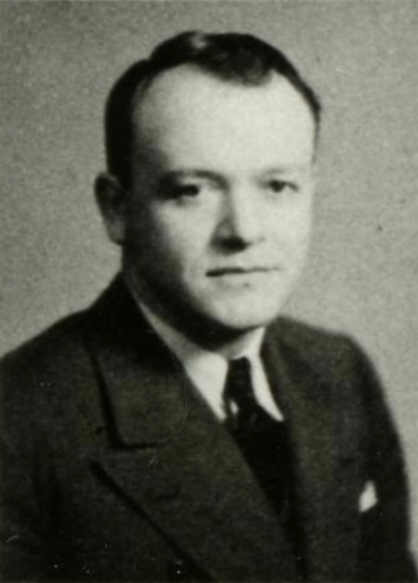
- Hurley in 1941

Member of the Washington House of Representatives from the 3rd district
- In office 1939–1943
- In office 1951–1953

Personal details
- Born: May 29, 1910
- Died: October 8, 1968 (aged 58)
- Party: Democratic
- Spouse: Margaret Hurley (m. 1935)

Joseph E. Hurley (May 29, 1910 – October 8, 1968) was an American politician. He served as a Democratic member for the 3rd district of the Washington House of Representatives.

== Life and career ==
Hurley was a Spokane attorney.

Hurley served in the Washington House of Representatives from 1939 to 1943 and again from 1951 to 1953.

Hurley died on October 8, 1968, at the age of 58.
