= John A. Moyer =

American politician

Member of the Washington House of Representatives from the 6th district
- In office 1987–1993

Member of the Washington State Senate from the 3rd district
- In office 1993–1997
- Preceded by: Lois Stratton
- Succeeded by: Lisa Brown

Personal details
- Born: February 25, 1922
- Died: August 27, 2014 (aged 92)
- Party: Republican

John Arthur Moyer (February 25, 1922 – August 27, 2014) was an American physician and politician in the state of Washington. Moyer served in the Washington House of Representatives from 1987 to 1993 and the Washington State Senate from 1993 to 1997.

== Early life ==
Moyer was born on February 25, 1922, in Glendive, Montana. His parents were Arthur Moyer, a farmer and owner of a feedlot business, and Nora Moore Moyer. His mother died of pneumonia in 1927 and Moyer and his two siblings were raised by housekeepers hired by his father until his father remarried Elvera Howell, a teacher, just before Moyer began high school. The family moved to Fargo, North Dakota, where he worked in his father's feedlot shop, studied woodwork and learned to play his stepmother's Colin saxophone. He was a good student and was selected as first chair of the state band in 1936. Despite his father's opposition, he decided to study medicine at North Dakota State University, graduating with a bachelor of science degree in pre-med in 1943. Instead of attending medical school, he was drafted into the U.S. Army during World War II.

== Medical career ==
The army offered him a chance to go to medical school if he could pass an exam and in 1943, he was sent to Washington and Lee University in Lexington, Virginia. After six months, he went to the University of North Dakota School of Medicine in Grand Forks, where he stayed until 1945, when he transferred to the University of Illinois School of Medicine, graduating with his medical degree two years later. Between 1947 and 1949, he completed general and surgical internships at Garfield Park Community Hospital before specializing in obstetrics and gynecology. He completed a specialized preceptorship supervised by professor George H. Rezek at the University of Illinois for two years and completed his residency at Cook County Hospital between 1951 and 1953.

He then returned to the army, where he served as a doctor at Fort Huachuca in Arizona. He had married Caroline Atkinson, a fellow student at the University of North Dakota, in 1946 and the couple had ten children. In 1955, Moyer left the military and, on the recommendation of friends from medical school, moved to Spokane, Washington. He initially joined a partnership with a few other doctors before starting his own practice, Gynob Northwest. He became well known in the area and estimated that he had delivered about 7,500 babies during his career. He looked for innovative approaches to medicine, introducing Lamaze childbirth courses, allowing fathers into the delivery room and hiring the first licensed nurse-midwife in Spokane.

Moyer supported the American Medical Association and became president of the Spokane County Medical Society in 1971. He often spoke about politics, publicly criticizing Senator Edward M. Kennedy's proposal of a health insurance bill, instead proposing a plan to protect patients from "catastrophic" medical bills. He aimed to encourage doctors to help low income patients. He was elected president of the Washington State Medical Association in 1977, serving as president-elect until he officially took office on September 24, 1978. He focused on doctors working as humanists.

== Political career ==
These experiences encouraged his interest in politics and he was approached by Mike Padden about running for office with the Republican Party. Moyer decided to focus on his medical practice, claiming he did not know which political party he would join. On January 4, 1986, his wife died of emphysema and the same year, he closed his practice and joined the Group Health Cooperative part-time. He decided to run for office in the Washington House of Representatives for the 6th district to replace Dick Bond on June 2, 1986, branding himself as a conservative Republican. He challenged Democrat Jan Polek in the 6th district, a constituency that had not sent a Democrat to the legislature since 1934. His platform focused on improving healthcare policy. He was unopposed in the September primary but he received only 7,522 votes, compared to Polek's 6,481, proving the race would be tighter than expected.

Polek's campaign accused Moyer of failing to pay property taxes and pledged her opposition to a proposal to make Hanford a nuclear waste dump, prompting Moyer to express his own opposition. There was a focus on women's issues, although Moyer had a strong backing from his former patients who formed a group called Moms for Moyer. Polek was pro-choice whereas Moyer believed it was a moral issue and that although he opposed abortion, he did not believe it should be illegal. He faced criticism for not appearing for a debate at the Eastern Washington University Women's Center on October 21, 1986, as he had scheduled a last minute surgery on the same day. Polek received an endorsement from The Spokesman-Review and on election night, she had received 13,401 votes to Moyer's 13,275. Both candidates waited a week for absentee ballots to be counted and after a recount, Moyer had won the election with a lead of 86 votes, receiving 14,102 votes while Polek received 14,016 votes.

During his first term, Moyer joined the Eastern Washington caucus and became known as an expert on medical issues. He was a strong supporter of a bill to mandate helmets on motorcycles. He was a member of the human services committee, the judiciary committee, the trade and economic development committee, and the agriculture and rural development committee. He was nominated by Governor Booth Gardner to an AIDS task force, where he created an informational booklet and a bill addressing the issue.

When he ran for re-election in 1988, he focused on bridging the economic disparities between the eastern and western halves of the state, tougher drug laws to prevent the spread of AIDs and raising taxes to fund healthcare, childcare and education. He was unopposed in the primary and ran against Democrat James McAuley in the general, winning with almost 66 percent of the vote, prompting McAuley to joke, "How do you run against a fellow who has delivered half the population of the district?"

Moyer was elected unanimously in 1989 to replace Lois Stratton as chair of the Eastern Washington caucus, although fractures began to appear in the group and he ultimately resigned from the position after two years. During his second term, he worked to pass the Maternity Care Access Act, establishing the First Steps program which improved infant mortality in the state. He also encouraged 20 fellow Republicans to support the House Democrats in increasing welfare payments, leading to the bill passing the House although it failed in the state senate.

He was re-elected again in 1990 with no challengers but a round of redistricting meant he would instead be running in the heavily Democratic 3rd district in 1992. He decided instead to run for the Washington State Senate, challenging Democrat Bill Day Jr. for an open seat. Day won the September primary by 3,000 votes but he was involved in a scandal involving campaign expenditure and with the backing of prominent Democratic state senators Stratton and Margaret Hurley, he became the first Democrat to win the seat in 60 years.

In the senate, Moyer focused again on healthcare reform. He worked with the Democrats to pass a healthcare reform bill, after requesting a number of amendments, although the majority of its provisions were repealed or changed after two years. Moyer assisted in creating the new version in 1995, which was known as the state Basic Health Plan. He also sponsored a bill to create a public education program on shaken baby syndrome. He also took a new job with the Columbia Basin Health Clinic, working on rural healthcare in Othello.

During his 1996 re-election campaign, he ran against Democrat Lisa Brown. He ran on the slogan "For Our Children". During the primary, Brown received 57 percent of the votes and Moyer began negative campaigning, planning radio ads to imply that she was a supporter of communism and was too lenient on sex offenders. In response, his offices were picketed by her supporters bearing signs stating "Dr. Moyer and Mr. Hyde!" He lost the election on November 5, 1996, receiving only 44 percent of the vote.

== Personal life ==
He began dating Joanne Halstead, a registered nurse at his practice during his first term in office and the couple married on January 10, 1988, in Spokane.

== Later life ==
After losing re-election, Moyer began to serve on the board of local Spokane organizations, including the Northwest Museum of Arts and Culture, the Interplayers Ensemble theatre and Allegro: Baroque and Beyond. He was actively involved with preventing demolition of the Davenport Hotel and with the Friends of the Falls group, which was founded in spring 1997 to protect the Spokane Falls. The name John Moyer Plaza was considered for the new plaza near the waterfalls, although it ultimately became the Spokane Tribal Gathering Place. Moyer was diagnosed with Parkinson's disease in 2001 and had a stroke in 2009. He died on August 27, 2014, from complications due to Parkinson's at the age of 92.
