= W. H. Plummer =

American politician

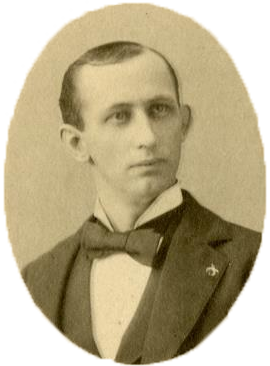
- Plummer in 1899

President pro tempore of the Washington Senate
- In office January 11, 1897 – January 9, 1899
- Preceded by: B. C. Van Houten
- Succeeded by: Augustus High

Member of the Washington Senate from the 3rd district
- In office January 11, 1897 – January 14, 1901
- Preceded by: B. C. Van Houten
- Succeeded by: Warren W. Tolman

Personal details
- Born: August 19, 1860 Westboro, Massachusetts, U.S.
- Died: December 22, 1926 (aged 66) Los Angeles, California, U.S.
- Party: Democratic (1899–1926)
- Other political affiliations: Populist (before 1899)

William H. Plummer (August 19, 1860 – December 22, 1926) was an American politician in the state of Washington. He served in the Washington State Senate from 1897 to 1901. From 1897 to 1899, he was President pro tempore of the Senate.

Born in Boston, Massachusetts, he became "one of the best known attorneys of Eastern Washington". He served as prosecuting attorney of Spokane County prior to his election to the state senate. While serving in the senate, he "fathered the bill that banned gambling in the State of Washington". He moved to Santa Ana, California around 1920, then returned to Spokane, Washington, and then moved to Los Angeles, California, around 1922, setting up a successful law practice there.

Plummer died in his home in Arcadia, California, at the age of 66, following a month-long illness. He was survived by his wife, Ella, and was interred at Pasadena, California.
