= Karen Stratton =

American politician, cannabis farmer and business person

- Born: 1958 (age 67–68)
- Education: Eastern Washington University
- Political party: Democratic
- Spouse: Chris Wright
- Parents: Allen Stratton (father); Lois Stratton (mother)

Karen Stratton (born 1958 or 1959 (age 67–68)) is an American politician, cannabis farmer, and businessperson in the cannabis industry. She served as a Spokane City Councilperson. from 2014 to December 31, 2023. She graduated from Marycliff High School in Spokane, and earned a bachelor's degree from Eastern Washington University.

Stratton was appointed to the Spokane City Council in 2014, then won election in 2015. She won an election to keep her seat on the City Council in 2019.
