= Michael C. Ormsby =

American lawyer (born 1957)

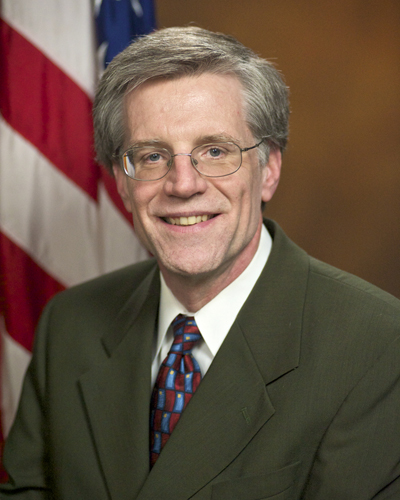

United States Attorney for the Eastern District of Washington
- In office October 15, 2010 – March 10, 2017
- President: Barack Obama; Donald Trump
- Preceded by: James A. McDevitt
- Succeeded by: Joseph Harrington (acting)

Personal details
- Born: 1957 (age 68–69) Spokane, Washington, U.S.
- Children: 4
- Education: Gonzaga University (BA, JD)
- Profession: Attorney

Michael C. Ormsby (born 1957) is a former United States Attorney for the Eastern District of Washington. He was appointed in 2010 by President Barack Obama upon the recommendation of Senator Patty Murray, replacing James A. McDevitt with whom he served at K&L Gates. As one of the 93 US Attorneys nationwide, he represents the United States in all civil and criminal cases within his district.

Before his appointment as US Attorney, Ormsby was an attorney in private practice. From 1981 to 1988, he was an associate at the eastern Washington law firm, Lukins & Annis—the same firm where he clerked and interned as a law student. From 1988 to 2010, he was a partner at K&L Gates, where he specialized in municipal finance and involved in the fraudulent River Park Square transaction. Throughout this time, he was heavily involved in Spokane politics.

Ormsby is a 1975 graduate of North Central High School (Spokane, Washington), a 1979 graduate of Gonzaga University, and a 1981 graduate of Gonzaga University School of Law. He is a self-reported baseball enthusiast, and was a partial owner of a Minor League Baseball team (the Yakima Bears). His brother, Timm, is a member of the Washington House of Representatives.

== See also ==
- 2017 dismissal of U.S. attorneys

Political offices
Preceded by James A. McDevitt	United States Attorney for the Eastern District of Washington; 2010–2017	Succeeded by Joseph Harrington (Acting)
