= Washington's 3rd legislative district =

American legislative district

Coordinates: 47.67°N 117.41°W

Washington 3rd legislative district map

Washington's 3rd legislative district is one of forty-nine districts in Washington state for representation in the state legislature. The district comprises most of inner Spokane. All but one of its 84 precincts are within the Spokane city limits (precinct 3000, with 8 voters, is just outside them).

The district's legislators are state senator Marcus Riccelli and state representatives Natasha Hill (position 1) and Timm Ormsby (position 2), all Democrats.

== Past legislators ==
=== Statehood-1932 ===
During this period, the state senate and state house districts were geographically distinct.

Year	Senate		House		
Year	Senator	Senate District Geography	House Position 1	House Position 2	House District Geography
1st (1889-1890)	H. W. Fairweather (R)	Lincoln County			
2nd (1891-1892)	B. C. Van Houten (R)	Spokane County (part)	House District Established		Spokane County (part)
2nd (1891-1892)	B. C. Van Houten (R)	Spokane County (part)	E. L. Powell (R)	A. V. Ragsdale (R)	Spokane County (part)
3rd (1893-1894)	B. C. Van Houten (R)	Spokane County (part)	G. W. Temple (R)	O. B. Nelson (R)	Spokane County (part)
4th (1895-1896)	B. C. Van Houten (R)	Spokane County (part)	G. W. Temple (R)	J. E. Foster (R)	Spokane County (part)
5th (1897-1898)	W. H. Plummer (Pop.) (Note: Changed party affiliation from Populist to Democratic in 1899)	Spokane County (part)	James M. Geraghty (Pop.)	Charles H. Wolf (Silver Rep.)	Spokane County (part)
6th (1899-1900)	W. H. Plummer (D)	Spokane County (part)	Wallace Mount (R)	Joseph Scott (R)	Spokane County (part)
7th (1901-1902)	Warren W. Tolman (D)	Spokane County (part)	C. G. Brown (R)	H. D. Merritt (D)	Spokane County (part)
8th (1903-1904)	Warren W. Tolman (D)	Spokane County (part)	W. A. Stark (R)	Walker A. Henry (R)	Spokane County (part)
9th (1905-1906)	C. G. Brown (R)	Spokane County (part)	W. D. Scott (R)	D. P. Bowers (R)	Spokane County (part)
10th (1907-1908)	C. G. Brown (R)	Spokane County (part)	J. B. Gilbert (R)	Richard A. Hutchinson (R)	Spokane County (part)
11th (1909-1910)	Jesse Huxtable (R)	Spokane County (part)	George L. Denman (R)	Morton Cogswell (R)	Spokane County (part)
12th (1911-1912)	Jesse Huxtable (R)	Spokane County (part)	George L. Denman (R)	Dalbert E. Twitchell (R)	Spokane County (part)
13th (1913-1914)	Harve H. Phipps (Prog.)	Spokane County (part)	Thomas J. Corkery (Prog.)	J. B. Oakes (Prog.)	Spokane County (part)
14th (1915-1916)	Harve H. Phipps (Prog.)	Spokane County (part)	Charles Timblin (R)	Albert A. Kelly (R)	Spokane County (part)
15th (1917-1918)	Harve H. Phipps (R)	Spokane County (part)	Albert A. Kelly (R)	David Porter Reid (R)	Spokane County (part)
16th (1919-1920)	Harve H. Phipps (R)	Spokane County (part)	J. B. Gilbert (R)	Albert A. Kelly (R)	Spokane County (part)
17th (1921-1922)	Linneus Lincoln Westfall (R) (Note: Deceased Jan.31, 1927)	Spokane County (part)	S. A. Mann (R)	Albert A. Kelly (R)	Spokane County (part)
18th (1923-1924)	Linneus Lincoln Westfall (R)	Spokane County (part)	Alvin H. Collin (R)	Daniel Morgan (R)	Spokane County (part)
19th (1925-1926)	Linneus Lincoln Westfall (R)	Spokane County (part)	Alvin H. Collin (R)	Marcus R. Morton (R)	Spokane County (part)
20th (1927-1928)	Linneus Lincoln Westfall (R)	Spokane County (part)	M. G. Martindale (R)	Alvin H. Collin (R)	Spokane County (part)
20th (1927-1928)	D. B. Heil (R) (Note: Served last 20 days of ’27 Session)	Spokane County (part)	M. G. Martindale (R)	Alvin H. Collin (R)	Spokane County (part)
21st (1929-1930)	Arthur L. True (R)	Spokane County (part)	Albert A. Kelly, Jr (R)	J. B. Gilbert (R)	Spokane County (part)
22nd (1931-1932)	Arthur L. True (R)	Spokane County (part)	M. G. Martindale (R)	Amos Hill (R)	Spokane County (part)

=== 1933-Present ===
After the passage of Initiative 57 and the 1930 redistricting cycle, the state senate and state house districts were geographically similar. While some senate districts would occasionally be broken up into house seats A and B, seats A and B were always contained in the Senate district boundaries.

The 3rd Legislative district's state senate and house seats are identical geographically from 1933 to the present day.

Year	Senate	House		District Geography
Year	Senator	House Position 1	House Position 2	District Geography
23rd (1933-1934)	Don Cary Smith (D) (Note: Redistricted out of district)	P. C. Shine (D)	Robert F. Waldron (D) (Note: Elected Speaker of the House for the 24th legislative session (1935-36))	Spokane County (part)
24th (1935-1936)	William R. Orndorff (D)	Paul J. Huetter (D)	Robert F. Waldron (D)	Spokane County (part)
25th (1937-1938)	William R. Orndorff (D)	Paul J. Huetter (D)	Robert F. Waldron (D)	Spokane County (part)
26th (1939-1940)	William R. Orndorff (D)	Joseph E. Hurley (D)	Agnes Kehoe (D)	Spokane County (part)
27th (1941-1942)	William R. Orndorff (D)	Joseph E. Hurley (D)	Agnes Kehoe (D)	Spokane County (part)
28th (1943-1944)	William R. Orndorff (D)	Agnes Kehoe (D)	T. J. Meenach (R)	Spokane County (part)
29th (1945-1946)	William R. Orndorff (D)	Agnes Kehoe (D)	Robert F. Waldron (D)	Spokane County (part)
30th (1947-1948)	William R. Orndorff (D)	Emmett S. Hennessey (R)	Walter J. Peters (R)	Spokane County (part)
31st (1949-1950)	James E. Keefe (D) (Note: Deceased June 15, 1979)	W. O. Allen (D)	Bernard J. Gallagher (D)	Spokane County (part)
32nd (1951-1952)	James E. Keefe (D)	Bernard J. Gallagher (D)	Joseph E. Hurley (D)	Spokane County (part)
33rd (1953-1954)	James E. Keefe (D)	Bernard J. Gallagher (D)	Margaret Hurley (D)	Spokane County (part)
34th (1955-1956)	James E. Keefe (D)	Bernard J. Gallagher (D)	Margaret Hurley (D)	Spokane County (part)
35th (1957-1958)	James E. Keefe (D)	Bernard J. Gallagher (D)	Margaret Hurley (D)	Spokane County (part)
36th (1959-1960)	James E. Keefe (D)	Bernard J. Gallagher (D)	Margaret Hurley (D)	Spokane County (part)
37th (1961-1962)	James E. Keefe (D)	Margaret Hurley (D) (Note: Elected senator Nov. 6, 1979; Sworn in Nov. 28, 1979 to serve unexpired term)	William; J. S. May (D)	Spokane County (part)
38th (1963-1964)	James E. Keefe (D)	Margaret Hurley (D)	William; J. S. May (D)	Spokane County (part)
39th (1965-1966)	James E. Keefe (D)	Margaret Hurley (D)	William; J. S. May (D)	Spokane County (part)
40th (1967-1968)	James E. Keefe (D)	Margaret Hurley (D)	William; J. S. May (D)	1965 Redistricting
40th (1967-1968)	James E. Keefe (D)	Margaret Hurley (D)	William; J. S. May (D)	Spokane County (part)
41st (1969-1970)	James E. Keefe (D)	Margaret Hurley (D)	William; J. S. May (D)	Spokane County (part)
42nd (1971-1972)	James E. Keefe (D)	Margaret Hurley (D)	William; J. S. May (D)	Spokane County (part)
43rd (1973-1974)	James E. Keefe (D)	Margaret Hurley (D)	William; J. S. May (D)	1972 Redistricting
43rd (1973-1974)	James E. Keefe (D)	Margaret Hurley (D)	William; J. S. May (D)	Spokane County (part)
44th (1975-1976)	James E. Keefe (D)	Margaret Hurley (D)	William; J. S. May (D)	Spokane County (part)
45th (1977-1978)	James E. Keefe (D)	Margaret Hurley (D)	William; J. S. May (D)	Spokane County (part)
46th (1979-1980)	James E. Keefe (D)	Margaret Hurley (D)	William; J. S. May (D)	Spokane County (part)
46th (1979-1980)	Katherine Reid (D) (Note: Appointed Aug. 13, 1979)	Margaret Hurley (D)	William; J. S. May (D)	Spokane County (part)
46th (1979-1980)	Margaret Hurley (D)	Lois Stratton (D)	William; J. S. May (D)	Spokane County (part)
47th (1981-1982)	Margaret Hurley (D)	Lois Stratton (D)	Margaret Leonard (R)	Spokane County (part)
48th (1983-1984)	Margaret Hurley (D)	Lois Stratton (D)	Dennis Dellwo (D) (Note: Resigned July 1, 1996)	Spokane County (part)
49th (1985-1986)	Lois Stratton (D)	Bill Day, Jr. (D)	Dennis Dellwo (D)	Spokane County (part)
50th (1987-1988)	Lois Stratton (D)	Bill Day, Jr. (D)	Dennis Dellwo (D)	Spokane County (part)
51st (1989-1990)	Lois Stratton (D)	Bill Day, Jr. (D)	Dennis Dellwo (D)	Spokane County (part)
52nd (1991-1992)	Lois Stratton (D)	Bill Day, Jr. (D)	Dennis Dellwo (D)	Spokane County (part)
53rd (1993-1994)	John A. Moyer (R)	Lisa Brown (D)	Dennis Dellwo (D)	Spokane County (part)
54th (1995-1996)	John A. Moyer (R)	Lisa Brown (D)	Dennis Dellwo (D)	Spokane County (part)
54th (1995-1996)	John A. Moyer (R)	Lisa Brown (D)	Lonnie Sparks (D) (Note: Appointed July 16, 1996 to serve unexpired term)	Spokane County (part)
55th (1997-1998)	Lisa Brown (D)	Alex Wood (D)	Jeff Gombosky (D) (Note: Resigned Aug. 10, 2003)	Spokane County (part)
56th (1999-2000)	Lisa Brown (D)	Alex Wood (D)	Jeff Gombosky (D)	Spokane County (part)
57th (2001-2002)	Lisa Brown (D)	Alex Wood (D)	Jeff Gombosky (D)	Spokane County (part)
58th (2003-2004)	Lisa Brown (D)	Alex Wood (D)	Jeff Gombosky (D)	Spokane County (part)
58th (2003-2004)	Lisa Brown (D)	Alex Wood (D)	Timm Ormsby (D) (Note: Elected Nov 2, 2010. Sworn in Dec 3, 2010 to serve unexpired term)	Spokane County (part)
59th (2005-2006)	Lisa Brown (D)	Alex Wood (D)	Timm Ormsby (D)	Spokane County (part)
60th (2007-2008)	Lisa Brown (D)	Alex Wood (D)	Timm Ormsby (D)	Spokane County (part)
61st (2009-2010)	Lisa Brown (D)	Alex Wood (D)	Timm Ormsby (D)	Spokane County (part)
62nd (2011-2012)	Lisa Brown (D)	Andy Billig (D)	Timm Ormsby (D)	Spokane County (part)
63rd (2013-2014)	Andy Billig (D)	Marcus Riccelli (D)	Timm Ormsby (D)	Spokane County (part)
64th (2015-2016)	Andy Billig (D)	Marcus Riccelli (D)	Timm Ormsby (D)	Spokane County (part)
65th (2017-2018)	Andy Billig (D)	Marcus Riccelli (D)	Timm Ormsby (D)	Spokane County (part)
66th (2019-2020)	Andy Billig (D)	Marcus Riccelli (D)	Timm Ormsby (D)	Spokane County (part)
67th (2021-2022)	Andy Billig (D)	Marcus Riccelli (D)	Timm Ormsby (D)	Spokane County (part)
68th (2023-2024)	Andy Billig (D)	Marcus Riccelli (D)	Timm Ormsby (D)	Spokane County (part)
69th (2025-2026)	Marcus Riccelli (D)	Natasha Hill (D)	Timm Ormsby (D)	Spokane County (part)

== Key ==
Democratic (D)
Populist (Pop)
Progressive (Bull Moose) (Prog)
Republican (R)
Silver Republican (SvR)

== See also ==
- Washington Redistricting Commission
- Washington State Legislature
- Washington State Senate
- Washington House of Representatives
- Washington (state) legislative districts
