= Katherine Reid =

Washington State politician

Member of the Washington Senate from the 3rd district
- In office August 13, 1979 (appointed) – November 28, 1979
- Preceded by: James E. Keefe
- Succeeded by: Margaret Hurley

Personal details
- Party: Democratic

Katherine Reid is a former American politician who served as a member of the Washington State Senate in 1979. She represented Washington's 3rd legislative district as a Democrat. She was appointed to serve the unexpired term of James E. Keefe upon his death, and served for less than three months until her successor Margaret Hurley won special election and was sworn in to serve the remainder of the term.
