= Natasha Hill =

American politician

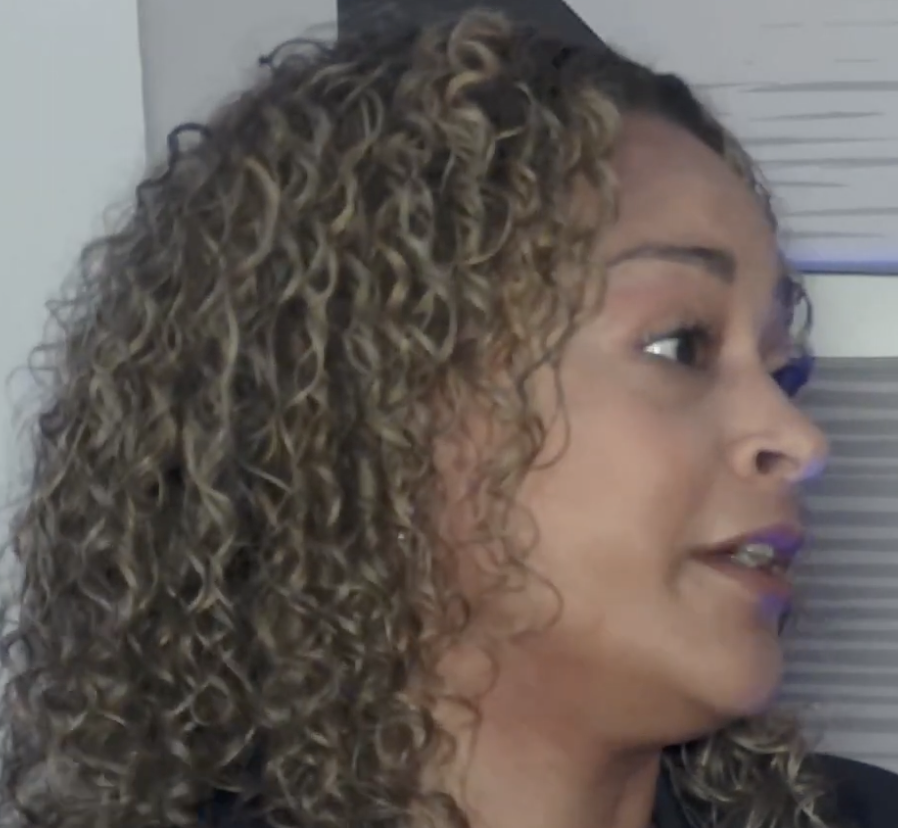
- Hill in 2024

Member of the Washington House of Representatives from the 3rd district
- Incumbent
- Assumed office January 13, 2025 Serving with Timm Ormsby
- Preceded by: Marcus Riccelli

Personal details
- Born: c. 1981 (age c. 44) Spokane, Washington, United States
- Party: Democratic
- Children: 2
- Education: University of Washington (BA); Southwestern Law School (JD)
- Occupation: Attorney, civil rights advocate

Natasha Hill (born c. 1981) is an American politician, attorney, and civil rights advocate who is a member of the Washington House of Representatives representing the state's 3rd district from Position 1. A member of the Democratic Party, Hill took office on January 13, 2025, succeeding Marcus Riccelli.

== Early life and education ==
Hill grew up in the Hillyard neighborhood, a low-income neighborhood on Spokane's North Side. Growing up in Hillyard informed her political views saying, "I experienced firsthand the ways that smart investments into social services, education and labor can positively impact communities and what residents experience when those investments aren't made." Hill graduated from Rogers High School and earned a Bachelor of Arts degree in sociology from the University of Washington in 2003. She then moved to Southern California to attend Southwestern University School of Law in Los Angeles, graduating in 2006. While in school, Hill worked for the Children's Law Center while at Southwestern.

== Career ==
After graduating from law school, Hill joined the Kaufman Law Firm and was recognized for bringing a diverse perspective as an attorney. She moved back to Spokane in 2015, working at different family law practices until she established her practice, Natasha L. Hill PS. Hill is an adjunct law professor at Gonzaga University, coaching the civil and human rights moot court teams.

Hill is a community activist and was a prominent voice in Spokane's Black Lives Matter protests in 2020. She has worked with the Spokane Community Against Racism (SCAR) and was involved in a potential case against the city of Spokane on behalf of SCAR to protect free speech and the right to peaceful protest. She has served as the interim editor for The Black Lens, a monthly newspaper focused on Spokane's Black community and local justice issues, since November 2023.

She is also a licensed realtor and a member of the Spokane Realtors Association.

== Political career ==
=== 2022 congressional campaign ===
In 2022, Hill ran as the Democratic nominee for Washington's 5th congressional district against incumbent Cathy McMorris Rodgers. She received 40.2% of the vote to McMorris Rodgers' 59.5%.

=== Washington House of Representatives ===
==== 2024 election ====
Hill announced her run for the Washington House of Representatives in March 2024 after Marcus Riccelli decided to run for state Senate. She faced Republican insurance agent Tony Kiepe and Democrat former Spokane city council member Ben Stuckart in the primary. During a June Pride event, Hill got into a confrontation with Stuckart, yelling disparaging remarks toward him, which led to Spokane County Democrats Chair Naida Spencer threatening to call security on Hill. Hill promptly accused Spencer of racism for attempting to intervene and claims that she was only trying to highlight policy differences between herself and Stuckart. The Spokane County Democrats announced they would investigate the incident, but it was delayed until after the election.

In the August 6 primary election, Kiepe came in first with 35.5% of the vote, with Hill narrowly coming in second with 32.47%, defeating Stuckart by 270 votes.

Hill focused her campaign on economic issues such as rent stabilization, affordable childcare, progressive taxes, and ending corporate subsidies. During the campaign, Hill received endorsements from the Spokane County Democrats, State Representative Timm Ormsby, Washington State Labor Council, and Planned Parenthood Action Fund.

In the November 5 general election, Hill defeated Kiepe with 58.6% of the vote to his 41.1%. Hill indicated that affordable housing, child care and access to healthcare and retirement benefits would be several priorities during the 2025 legislative session. Hill is a proponent of instituting an income tax in the state of Washington.

== Personal life ==
Hill is a single mother of two children.
