= E. M. Rands =

American politician

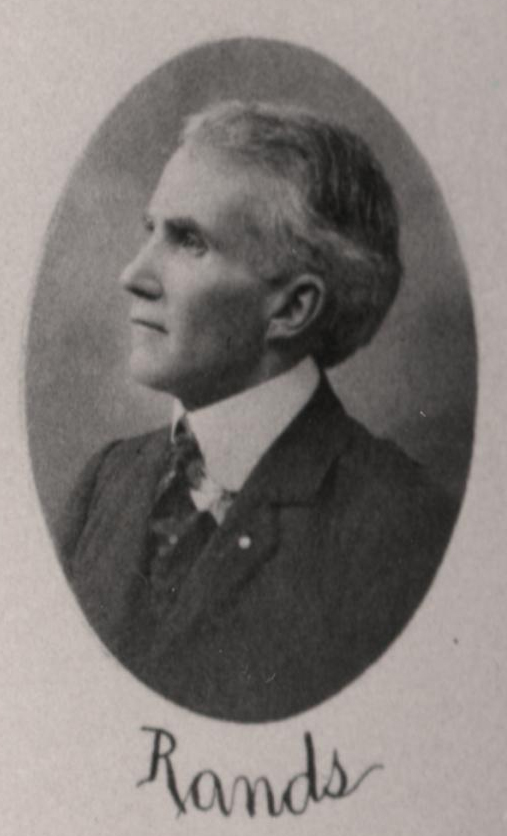
- Rands in 1901

Member of the Washington State Senate
- In office January 12, 1903 – January 11, 1909
- Preceded by: Grant C. Angle
- Succeeded by: A. B. Eastham
- Constituency: 17th
- In office January 14, 1901 – January 12, 1903
- Preceded by: Augustus High
- Succeeded by: John P. Sharp
- Constituency: 13th

Personal details
- Born: Edward McKeever Rands; June 2, 1856 Marshalltown, Iowa, U.S.
- Died: April 13, 1922 (aged 65) Vancouver, Washington, U.S.
- Party: Republican

Edward McKeever Rands (June 2, 1856 – April 13, 1922) was an American politician in the state of Washington. He served in the Washington State Senate from 1901 to 1909 (1901 to 1903 for district 13, 1903 to 1909 for district 17).
