= Timm Ormsby =

American politician (born 1959)

Member of the Washington House of Representatives from the 3rd district
- Incumbent
- Assumed office September 30, 2003 Serving with Natasha Hill
- Preceded by: Jeff Gombosky
- Succeeded by: Luc Jasmin III (elect)

Personal details
- Born: Timothy Sean Ormsby; June 17, 1959 (age 67) Spokane, Washington, U.S.
- Party: Democratic
- Spouse: Kimberly "Kim" Ormsby
- Education: North Central High School
- Profession: Cement Mason; Union President
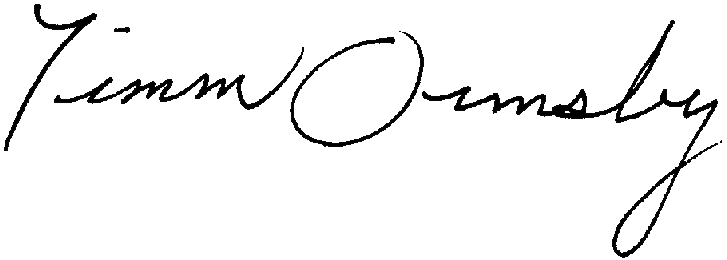
- Signature
- Website: Official

Timothy Sean Ormsby (born June 17, 1959) is an American politician. He is a Democratic member of the Washington House of Representatives, and represents Washington's third district since 2003.

Ormsby went to North Central High School in Spokane, Washington. His brother, Michael C. Ormsby, was the US Attorney for the Eastern District of Washington.

In 2018, Ormsby was charged with a DUI after rolling his Jeep, however that charge was dropped in exchange for his guilty plea to reckless driving. The next year he blocked a bill that would have made receiving four DUIs in a fifteen year period a felony offense.

In 2025, Ormsby, along with Rep. Mia Gregerson(D-Seatac), sponsored House Bill 1475 proposing to cut the bonuses for certified Washington state teachers.

== Awards and honors ==
Ormsby was one of four recipients of the 2009 Fuse "Sizzle" Awards Mother Jones Award. The award honored the lawmakers for their leadership of a coalition of conservation and labor legislators.
