= Bill May (Washington politician) =

American politician (1902–1989)

William J. S. May
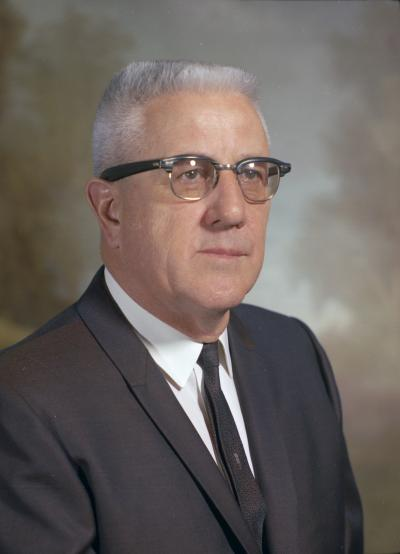
- William J. S. May in 1967

Member of the Washington House of Representatives for the 3rd district
- In office 1979–1981
- Succeeded by: Margaret Leonard

Personal details
- Born: April 6, 1902 England
- Died: June 1, 1989 (aged 87) Spokane, Washington, United States
- Party: Democratic

William J. S. May (April 6, 1902 – June 1, 1989) was an American politician in the state of Washington. He served in the Washington House of Representatives from 1961 to 1981.
