= Dennis Dellwo =

American politician from Washington

Member of the Washington House of Representatives from the 3rd, Position 2 district
- In office January 10, 1983 – January 3, 1997
- Preceded by: Margaret Leonard
- Succeeded by: Jeff Gombosky

Personal details
- Born: August 31, 1945 (age 80) Washington, D.C.
- Party: Democratic
- Spouse: Lynnette Dellwo
- Children: 6
- Occupation: Politician

Dennis Dellwo (born August 31, 1945) is an American politician who served in the Washington House of Representatives from the 3rd district from 1983 to 1996.

On November 6, 2012, Dellwo unsuccessfully ran for Washington House of Representatives for District 6. Dellwo was defeated by Jeff Holy. Dellwo received 45.16% of the votes.

== Personal life ==
Dellwo's wife is Lynnette Dellwo. They have six children. Dellwo and his family live in Spokane, Washington.
