= Andy Billig =

American politician

Majority Leader of the Washington Senate
- In office January 12, 2019 – January 13, 2025
- Preceded by: Sharon Nelson
- Succeeded by: Jamie Pedersen

Member of the Washington Senate from the 3rd district
- In office January 14, 2013 – January 13, 2025
- Preceded by: Lisa Brown
- Succeeded by: Marcus Riccelli

Member of the Washington House of Representatives from the 3rd district
- In office January 10, 2011 – January 14, 2013
- Preceded by: Alex Wood
- Succeeded by: Marcus Riccelli

Personal details
- Born: Andrew Swire Billig; May 1, 1968 (age 58) New York, U.S.
- Party: Democratic
- Education: Georgetown University (BA)
- Website: State Senate website

Andrew Swire Billig (born May 1, 1968) is an American politician of the Democratic Party and co-owner of the Spokane Indians minor league baseball team. On November 6, 2012, Billig was elected to the Washington State Senate, representing the 3rd Legislative District until his retirement in 2025. He served as the Senate Majority Leader from 2019 to 2025.

== Personal life ==
Billig grew up in Chevy Chase, Maryland. Billig graduated cum laude from Georgetown University in 1990 with a degree in government. He has two children, Isabella "Bella" and Samuel, and is an active runner and triathlete, having completed the Coeur d’Alene Ironman Triathlon in 2004.

== Political positions ==
In 2011, Billig received the Inter-Continental Smackdown Champion Award from Fuse Washington for his work against phosphorus pollution in Washington's lakes and rivers. He has expressed support for gun control, including a bill that would ban possession of high-capacity magazines.

== Washington House of Representatives ==
After he was elected to the House of Representatives in 2010, Billig immediately assumed a transportation leadership position in the House, serving as vice-chair of the House Transportation Committee. In that role, he helped write the state's two-year transportation budget. Billig also served on the Education, Environment, and Technology & Economic Development committees.

== Washington Senate ==
In 2012, Billig was elected to the Senate, where he was given a leadership position as the Minority Whip. In 2015, he was chosen to represent the caucus as the Deputy Leader and served as the Senate Majority Leader from 2018 to 2024. During the 2018 legislative session, he served on the Early Learning & K-2 Education, Ways & Means, and Rules committees. One of his primary achievements of the 2018 session was the DISCLOSE Act, which increases transparency of campaign contributions and closes campaign finance disclosure loopholes. In 2024, Billig announced he would not seek reelection for a fourth term.

== Spokane Indians Baseball Team ==
In 1992, Billig became general manager of the Spokane Indians Baseball Team. He later became president and co-owner of the team and remains active in management and ownership. Billig is currently the CEO of Brett Sports, the umbrella organization that operates the Spokane Indians Baseball Club and the Spokane Chief Hockey Club.

=== Awards ===
Billig has been recognized repeatedly for his leadership with the Spokane Indians, being voted Northwest League Executive of the Year in both 1994 and 2004. He was also nominated for the Larry MacPhail Award for promotional excellence several times and won the Joe Martin Award for Service to Baseball and the Community in 2007.

== Sustainabile Aviation Fuel ==
Billig has been a leader in the field of Sustainable Aviation Fuels (SAF). In the Senate, he prime-sponsored multiple bills on SAF and was the founding chair of the Washington State Alternative Jet Fuels Workgroup, a position he held for 12 years. He continues to work on advancing SAF production and use as a Senior Advisor for SkyNRG and as a featured speaker at SAF meetings and conferences.

Washington State Senate
Preceded by Sharon Nelson	Majority Leader of the Washington Senate; 2019–2025	Succeeded by Jamie Pedersen
