= Marcus Riccelli =

American politician from Washington

Member of the Washington State Senate from the 3rd district
- Incumbent
- Assumed office January 13, 2025
- Preceded by: Andy Billig

Member of the Washington House of Representatives from the 3rd district
- In office January 14, 2013 – January 13, 2025
- Preceded by: Andy Billig
- Succeeded by: Natasha Hill

Personal details
- Born: Marcus Michael Riccelli; June 7, 1978 (age 48) Spokane, Washington, U.S.
- Party: Democratic
- Spouse: Amanda Marie Riccelli
- Education: Gonzaga University; University of Washington
- Occupation: Politician
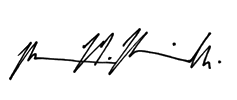
- Signature
- Website: Official website

Marcus Michael Riccelli (born June 7, 1978) is an American politician of the Democratic Party. He won election to the Washington State Senate in November 2024, defeating Republican Jim Wilson with 60.54% of the vote. He previously served in the State House of Representatives, representing the 3rd district from 2013 to 2025.

== Early life and education ==
Riccelli is a graduate of Mead High School in Spokane. He received a Bachelor of Business Administration degree from Gonzaga University in 2000, and a Master of Public Administration degree in 2007 from the Daniel J. Evans School of Public Affairs at the University of Washington.

== Career ==
Riccelli worked as U.S. Senator Maria Cantwell’s Eastern Washington director and as senior policy adviser to the former state Senate majority leader Lisa Brown. He was elected to the Washington State House of Representatives in 2012. From 2016 – 2022, he served as the Majority Whip. He chaired the House Health Care and Wellness committee during the 2023 – 2024 legislative biennium. Outside of the Legislature, he works as a Community Relations Manager for the Community Health Association of Spokane.

== Personal life ==
Riccelli is married with two children.
