= Bernard J. Gallagher =

American politician

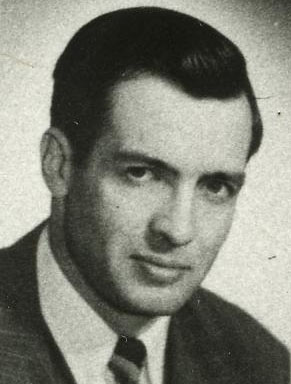
- Bernard Gallagher in 1949

Member of the Washington House of Representatives from the 5th district
- In office 1941–1943

Member of the Washington House of Representatives from the 3rd district
- In office 1949–1961

Personal details
- Born: February 27, 1912 Prosser, Washington, United States
- Died: August 3, 1995 (aged 83) Washington, United States
- Party: Democratic

Bernard J. Gallagher (February 27, 1912 – August 3, 1995) was a politician from Washington. Gallagher was a Democratic member of Washington House of Representatives from 1941 to 1943 and from 1949 to 1961.
