= 2019 Spokane mayoral election =

- November 5, 2019
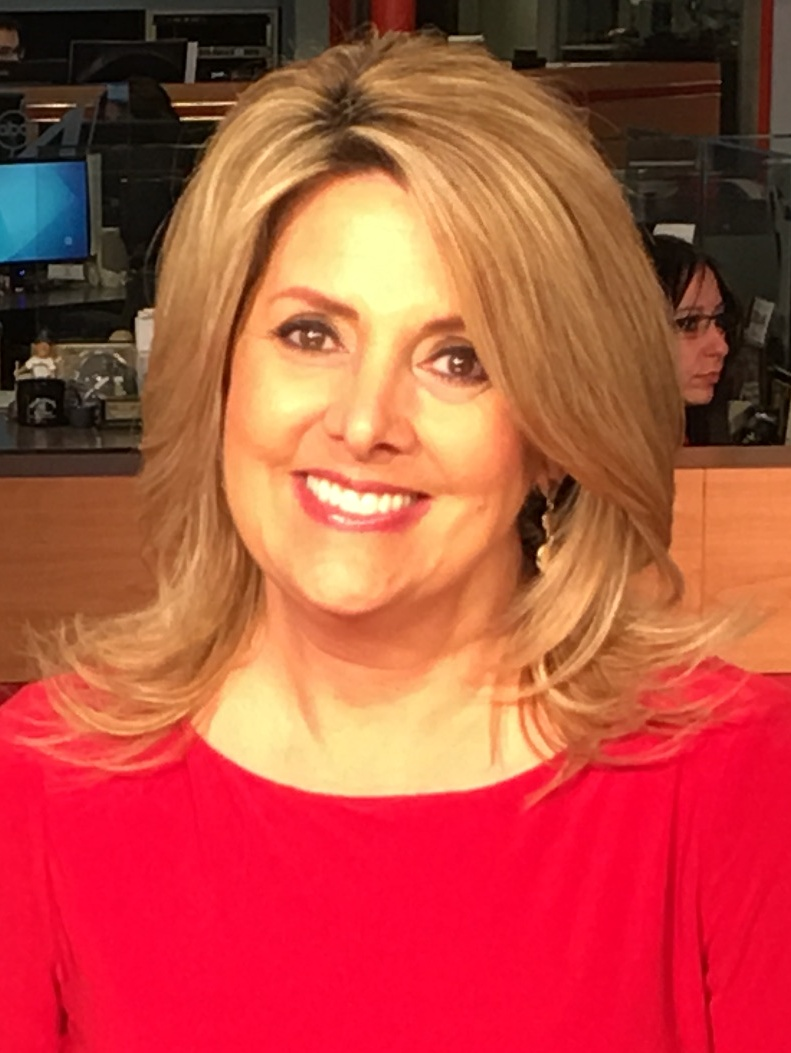

Candidate	Nadine Woodward	Ben Stuckart
Popular vote	34,540	33,692
Percentage	50.3%	49.1%
- Precinct results Woodward: 40–50% 50–60% 60–70% 70–80% Stuckart: 40–50% 50–60% 60–70% 70–80% Tie: 50%
Mayor before election
David Condon
Republican
Elected Mayor
Nadine Woodward
Nonpartisan (Note: Although Woodward has been supported by and shares beliefs with Republicans, Woodward has never explicitly affiliated with the Republican Party.)

The 2019 Spokane mayoral election took place on November 5, 2019, to elect the mayor of Spokane, Washington. The previous mayor, David Condon was unable to run due to term limits. It saw former local news anchor Nadine Woodward defeat former Spokane City Council president Ben Stuckart by a margin of just over one percentage point.

== Background ==
While both general election candidates officially listed themselves as non-partisan, each represented one side of the right-left political divide in the United States with Woodward on the right-wing and Stuckart on the left-wing.

Despite sitting in a long-time Republican-held Congressional district, the City of Spokane itself had become Democrat-leaning in the years leading up to the 2019 mayoral election. Stuckart led a city council with a liberal super-majority — which persisted after the election — and the Democratic challenger to congresswoman Cathy McMorris-Rodgers won the city by 17 percentage points in the prior year's election. Woodward's ability as a right-wing candidate to win the left-leaning city was due in large part to her popularity as a nearly three-decade presence on local TV news at both KREM and KXLY as well as her ability to turn the race into a referendum on homelessness and crime.

== Primary election ==
Washington has a nonpartisan blanket primary system. The top two finishers in the primary face each other in the general election.

The primary election was held on August 6, 2019.

=== Candidates ===
==== Advanced to general ====
- Ben Stuckart, former city council president
- Nadine Woodward, former news anchor

==== Eliminated in primary ====
- Jonathan Bingle, former pastor
- Kelly P. Cruz, chairman of Spokane C.O.P.S.
- Shawn Poole, firefighter and veteran

==== Declined ====
- Lisa Brown, former Majority Leader of the Washington Senate (2005–2013), and Democratic candidate for Washington's 5th congressional district in 2018

Blanket primary results by precinct Woodward: 30–40%; 40–50%; 50–60%; 60–70%; Stuckart: 30–40%; 40–50%; 50–60%; 60–70%; Woodward/Stuckart Tie: 30–40%

=== Results ===
Primary results
Candidate	Votes	%
Nadine Woodward	19,366	40.11
Ben Stuckart	18,353	38.02
Shawn Poole	6,122	12.68
Jonathan Bingle	3,157	6.54
Kelly P. Cruz	1,080	2.24
Under votes	622	1.27
Write-in	200	0.41
Over votes	17	0.04
Total votes	48,917	100.00

== General election ==
=== Endorsements ===
Nadine Woodward

State legislators

- Michael Baumgartner, former state senator from the 6th district (2011-2019)

Local officials

- David Condon, outgoing mayor of Spokane
- Ozzie Knezovich, sheriff of Spokane County

Labor unions

- Inland Northwest Associated General Contractors
- Spokane Association of Realtors
- Spokane Home Builders Association
- Spokane Police Union

Newspapers

- The Spokesman-Review

Tribes

- Kalispel Tribe of Indians
Ben Stuckart

Statewide officials

- Jay Inslee, Governor of Washington

State legislators

- Andy Billig, Washington State Senate majority leader from the 3rd district
- Timm Ormsby, state representative from the 3rd district
- Marcus Riccelli, state representative from the 3rd district

Local officials

- Karen Stratton, city councilmember (2014-present)
- Sheri Barnard, former mayor of Spokane (1990-1994)
- Jack Geraghty, former mayor of Spokane (1994-1998)
- Joe Shogan, former Spokane City Council president

=== Results ===
General election results
Candidate	Votes	%
Nadine Woodward	34,540	50.32
Ben Stuckart	33,692	49.08
Under votes	881	1.27
Write-in	409	0.60
Over votes	7	0.01
Total votes	69,529	100.00
