= 2023 Spokane mayoral election =

- November 7, 2023
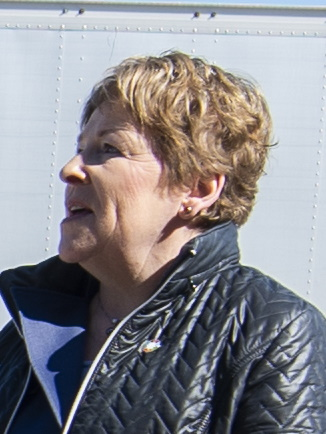

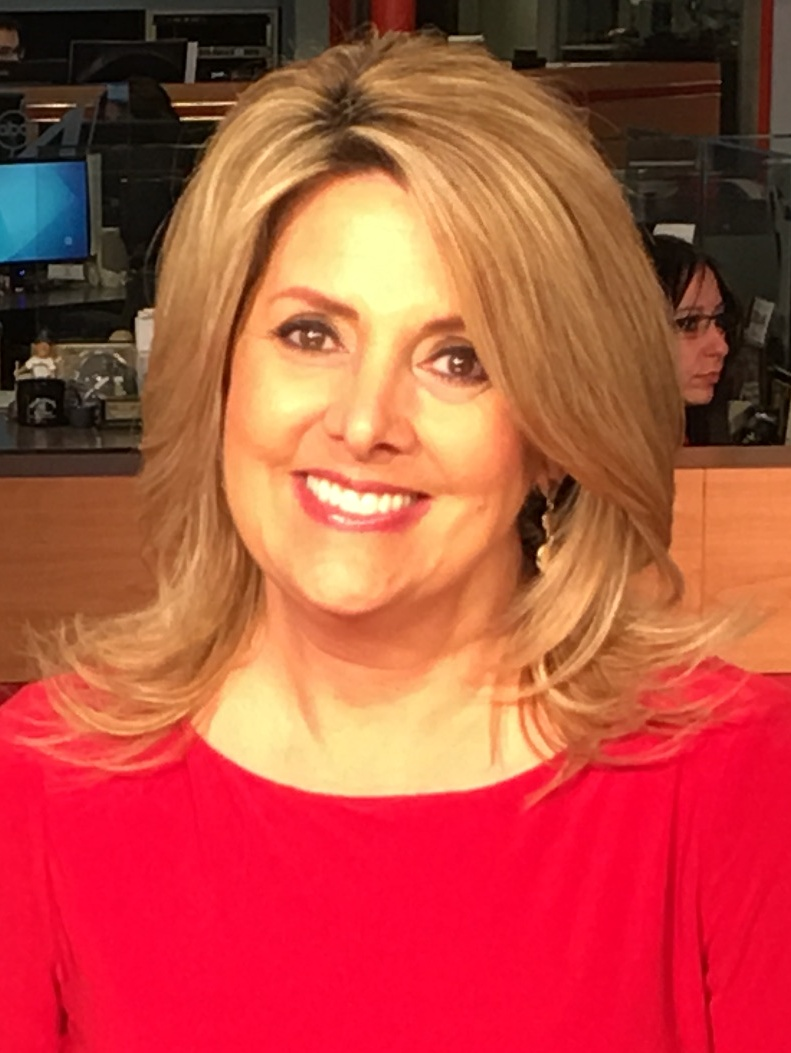
Candidate	Lisa Brown	Nadine Woodward
Popular vote	36,601	33,748
Percentage	51.74%	47.71%
- Precinct results Brown: 40–50% 50–60% 60–70% 70–80% Woodward: 40–50% 50–60% 60–70% 70–80% Tie: 40–50%
Mayor before election
Nadine Woodward
Republican
Elected Mayor
Lisa Brown
Democratic

The 2023 Spokane mayoral election was held on November 7, 2023, to elect the mayor of Spokane in the U.S. state of Washington. The election was officially nonpartisan. Incumbent Republican mayor Nadine Woodward, who ran for a second term, and former Senate Majority Leader Lisa Brown advanced to the general election as the top two candidates in the top-two primary on August 1, 2023. On November 10, three days after the general election, Brown was declared the winner.

== Primary election ==
=== Candidates ===
==== Declared ====
- Tim Archer, former president of International Association of Fire Fighters Local 29
- Lisa Brown, former director of the Washington State Department of Commerce, former majority leader of the Washington Senate, and runner-up for WA-05 in 2018 (Democratic)
- Patrick McKann, yurt builder and former wildlife biologist
- Kelly Stevens, pothole fixer
- Nadine Woodward, incumbent mayor (Republican)

==== Withdrawn ====
- Deece Casillas, comedian
- Keith Kleven
- Jonathan Legault, commercial real estate appraiser (Green)

==== Declined ====
- Breean Beggs, president of the Spokane City Council
- Natasha Hill, attorney and runner-up for WA-05 in 2022 (Democratic)
- Ben Stuckart, former president of the Spokane City Council and runner-up for mayor in 2019 (endorsed Brown)
- Amber Waldref, Spokane County commissioner
- Vanessa Waldref, U.S. attorney for the Eastern District of Washington
- Chud Wendle, businessman
- Zack Zappone, city councilor

=== Endorsements ===
Tim Archer

Organizations

- Spokane County Republican Party
Lisa Brown

Local officials

- Ben Stuckart, former president of the Spokane City Council and runner-up for mayor in 2019 (Democratic)

Labor unions

- AFL–CIO Spokane Regional Labor Council
- Spokane National Association of Realtors

Organizations

- Fuse Washington

Party chapters

- Spokane County Democratic Party
Nadine Woodward

Local officials

- John Nowels, sheriff of Spokane County (Republican)

Blanket primary results by precinct Brown: 30–40%; 40–50%; 50–60%; 60–70%; 70–80%; Woodward: 30–40%; 40–50%; 50–60%; Archer: 30–40%; Brown/Woodward Tie: 30–40%

=== Results ===
2023 Spokane mayoral primary election
Candidate	Votes	%
Lisa Brown	24,756	47.52
Nadine Woodward (incumbent)	19,072	36.61
Tim Archer	6,697	12.85
Patrick McKann	1,082	2.08
Kelly Stevens	438	0.84
Write-in	46	0.09
Total votes	52,091	100.00

== General election ==
=== Candidates ===
- Lisa Brown, former director of the Washington State Department of Commerce, former majority leader of the Washington Senate, and runner-up for WA-05 in 2018 (Democratic)
- Nadine Woodward, incumbent mayor (Republican)

=== Campaign ===
In August, Woodward appeared on stage at the same event as Matt Shea, a Republican former state legislator who was ousted from the party's caucus due to accusations that he belonged to a far-right militia group planning to overthrow the government. During his speech, Shea praised Woodward and endorsed her for re-election; when Woodward took the stage later, she thanked him for his support. This led the Spokane City Council to formally denounce Woodward. Woodward's campaign released a statement saying, "I did not seek, nor do I accept any support from Matt Shea. I am opposed to his political views as they are a threat to our democracy, and I regret my public appearance with him."

=== Post-primary endorsements ===
Lisa Brown

Labor unions

- SEIU 775
- Service Employees International Union
Nadine Woodward

State legislators

- Matt Shea, former state representative from the 4th district (2009–2021) (Republican) (Note: Woodward rejected Shea's endorsement)

Local officials

- Ozzie Knezovich, former sheriff of Spokane County (2006–2022) (Republican)
Declined to endorse

Individuals

- Tim Archer, former president of International Association of Fire Fighters Local 29 and primary candidate

=== Results ===
2023 Spokane mayoral general election
Candidate	Votes	%
Lisa Brown	36,601	51.74
Nadine Woodward (incumbent)	33,748	47.71
Write-in	380	0.5
Total votes	70,729	100.00
