= 2015 Spokane mayoral election =

- November 4, 2015
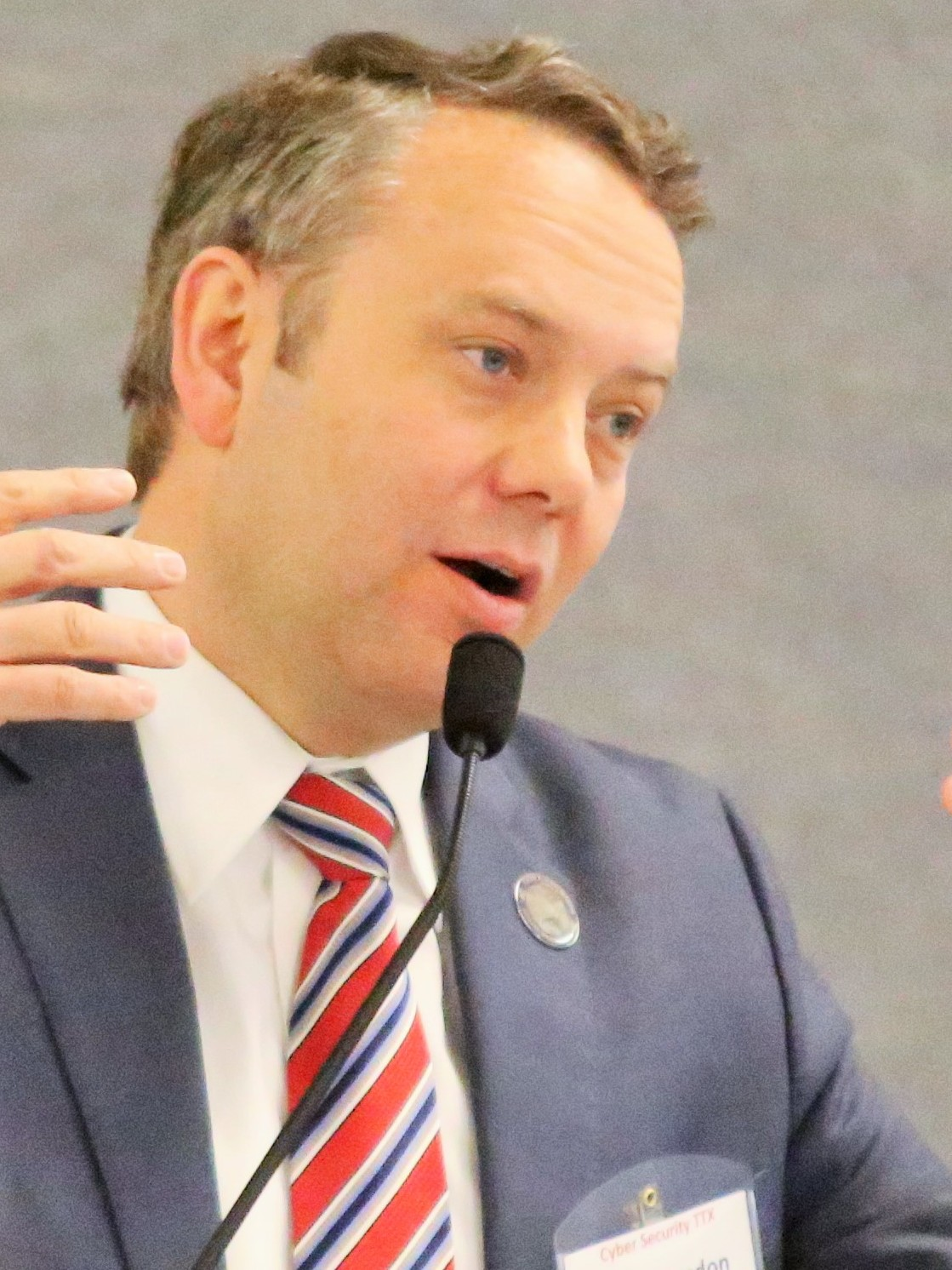

| Candidate | David Condon | Shar Lichty |
| Party | Nonpartisan | Democratic |
| Popular vote | 20,414 | 12,172 |
| Percentage | 62.65% | 37.35% |
Mayor before election
David Condon
Nonpartisan
Elected Mayor
David Condon
Nonpartisan

The 2015 Spokane mayoral election took place on November 4, 2015, to elect the mayor of Spokane, Washington. David Condon won a second term. No mayor had won a second term since David Rodgers in 1973.

== Results ==
=== Primary ===
Washington has a nonpartisan blanket primary system. The top two-finishers in the primary face each other in the general election.

The primary was held on August 4, 2015.

Primary results
| Candidate | Votes | % |
|---|---|---|
| David Condon (incumbent) | 17,078 | 66.36 |
| Shar Lichty | 6,216 | 24.15 |
| Michael J. Noder | 2,442 | 9.49 |
| Total votes | 25,736 | 100 |

=== General election ===
General election results
| Candidate | Votes | % |
|---|---|---|
| David Condon | 20,414 | 62.65% |
| Shar Lichty | 12,172 | 37.35% |
| Total votes | 32,586 | 100 |

=== Endorsements ===
David Condon

Newspapers

- The Spokesman-Review
