= James M. Geraghty =

American judge

Hon. James M. Geraghty

Washington State Supreme Court
- In office 1933–1940
- Appointed by: Governor Clarence D. Martin

Personal details
- Born: February 2, 1870 County Mayo, Ireland
- Died: April 29, 1940 (aged 70) Spokane, Washington
- Relations: Jack Geraghty, grandson

James M. Geraghty (February 2, 1870 – April 29, 1940) was an Irish American politician. He is known as a former member of the Washington State House of Representatives, elected in 1897 to represent the 3rd legislative district from Spokane, Washington. An attorney by trade, he served as Spokane's city attorney from 1905 to 1907, and again from 1916 to 1932. In 1933, he was appointed to the Washington State Supreme Court, by Governor Clarence D. Martin.

== Personal background ==
James M. Geraghty was born on February 2, 1870, in County Mayo, Ireland. He is the son of Patrick and Bridget (née Haley) Geraghty. In 1880, the family immigrated to the US, arriving in New York and establishing a farm in Indiana. He attended school in Rush County, Indiana. After relocating to Spokane in 1892, he initially worked as a teamster, before attending business school. In 1908, Geraghty married Nora Toolen. Together, they raised nine children in Spokane. They were members of the Catholic Church, known for supporting Catholic interests throughout the Pacific Northwest.

In December 1939, Geraghty began experiencing symptoms from a recurring kidney disease and died on April 29, 1940, in Spokane.

== Professional background ==
Following his graduation from business school, Geraghty joined the staff of the City of Spokane's Corporate Counsel, William H. Plummer, where he worked as a stenographer. During this time, he was drawn to the legal profession and began studying law, under the guidance of Plummer. In 1896, running as a Conservative, under the Fusion ticket, Geraghty was elected as the youngest member of the Washington House of Representatives. In 1897, he passed the state bar in Olympia and began practicing law.

When the state legislature elected George Turner as US Senator, Geraghty joined him as his private secretary. While in Washington D.C., Geraghty attended classes at the Georgetown University Law Center. After three years, he returned to Spokane and joined the law practice of John P. Judson. After Turner's term in the senate ended, Geraghty joined a law practice with him in Spokane.

In 1905, Geraghty was appointed under a Democratic administration to serve a two-year term as city attorney in Spokane in the same office where he previously worked as a stenographer. In 1916, under a nonpartisan city administration, he returned to the same office, serving until 1910, when he was selected to serve as a member of Governor Martin's cabinet.

== Family ==
Geraghty is the grandfather of Jack Geraghty (b. 1934), who served as the 39th Mayor of Spokane, Washington. Coincidentally, while Geraghty served as Spokane's City Attorney during the first decade of the 20th century, his grandson served as the mayor of the city during the last decade.
