= Flag of Spokane, Washington =

Spokane, Washington
- Use: Civil flag
- Adopted: June 14, 2021
- Designed by: Derek Landers

The flag of Spokane, Washington, comprises a sun in the canton on a white-and-green field separated by a stylized blue river. The flag was adopted in 2021 and is the fourth to be used by the city government.

Spokane's first city flag, a navy blue field with a white stripe, was adopted in 1912 following a public contest with more than 500 entries. It was replaced in 1958 with a new lilac flag designed by a local businessman. A third flag was adopted in October 1975, shortly after Spokane hosted the World's Fair and was named an All-America City; its design included a simple black ring and two bands of chartreuse green and aqua blue running diagonally across a white field. The third flag was rarely used and was replaced in 2021 following a public contest and vote overseen by a city-appointed flag commission.

== Design ==
The Spokane flag comprises a split field of white and green, the latter representing the land, separated by a series of blue lines that reference the Spokane River and Spokane Falls. A stylized yellow sun sits in the canton to represent the city's name, originally sp̓q̓n̓iʔ in the Salish language (meaning "sun"), and the indigenous Spokane people. The flag was designed by graphic designer Derek Landers, initially for a 2019 contest hosted by the Inlander, and omitted visible landmarks due to his personal preference for a simple and versatile design.

== History ==
=== First flag: 1912–1958 ===
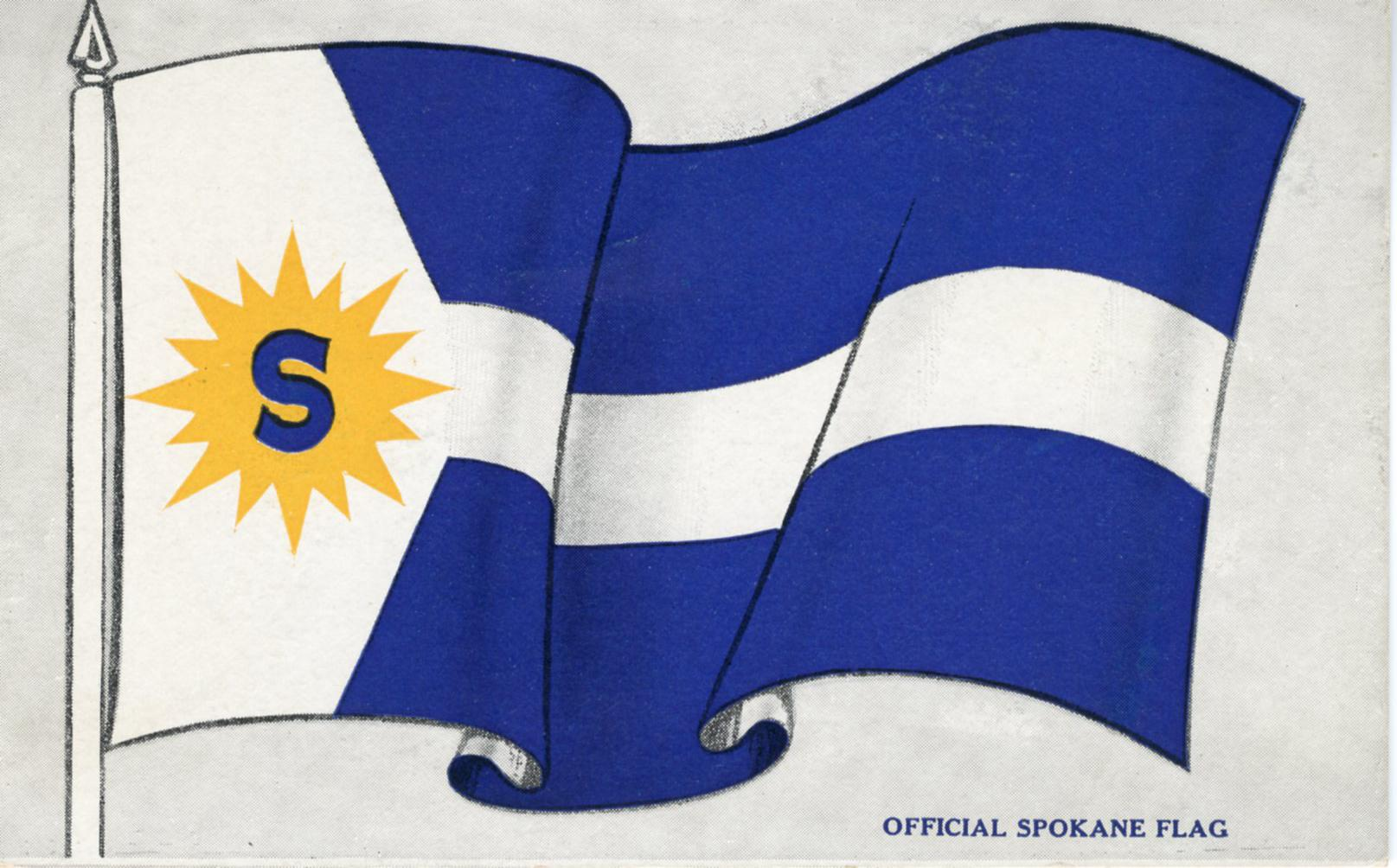
A 1920 postcard depicting the first city flag of Spokane

Spokane's first city flag was created through a public contest held by the Spokane Ad Club in July 1912, following the creation of a flag commission by the city government. The contest was opened to residents of Spokane and the Inland Empire and offered a $25 prize for the winning design. More than 500 entries were submitted during the month-long contest, including drawings, sewn flags, and pennants. Ad Club president R. E. Bigelow had desired a rectangular design that would complement the national flag's shape and colors, but said that any design would be accepted for consideration by the judges.

The winning entry, designed by Spokane residents W. J. Kommers, J. Frank Robbins, and Mrs. Herman Peterson, was unveiled on August 1, 1912. It consisted of a navy blue field with a white stripe that splits into a pentagon at the left side, where a sixteen-pointed sun with a blue "S" was placed. The first flag was produced by John Graham & Company and displayed at the 1912 Interstate Fair. The flag was used unofficially by the Ad Club to represent Spokane at national conventions and for viewings by other cities interested in designing their own flags, including Chicago. It was officially adopted by the city government in 1915, following a lobbying campaign by the Ad Club. The last remaining reproduction of the city flag is stored in the collections of the Northwest Museum of Arts and Culture.

=== Second flag: 1958–1975 ===
A new city flag was proposed in 1958 by local businessman S. Luther Essick, who also served as president of the Spokane chamber of commerce and the Lilac Festival Association. Essick was inspired during his work in Vienna after World War II, where he saw citizens using their city flag as a source of civic pride. His design was adopted by the city council on July 25, 1958, to celebrate the Lilac Festival, and installed at the city hall on September 9. The first flag was later donated to the Expo '74 organizing committee in 1974 after being used as part of the World's Fair ceremonies.

The second city flag consisted of a lilac purple field with four white lines extending from the corners towards the center, where several images were displayed. The center's design included the city skyline, the Monroe Street Bridge above Spokane Falls, and a spray of lilac blossoms. The outline of Mount Spokane sits above the center skyline and below a yellow sun, referencing the city's namesake, the Spokane people. An evergreen tree in blue sits to the left side and a five-pointed star sits opposite to the right. The text "Spokane" is written below in stylized script between two sections of an arrow.

=== Third flag: 1975–2021 ===
The third flag of Spokane, used from 1975 to 2021

At a city council briefing in June 1975, mayor David H. Rodgers displayed the then-current lilac flag and requested a new design. He described the lilac flag as being a "good design for its day", but "not suitable for Spokane's new status as an All-America City". The city adopted a new flag on October 6, 1975, which was designed by art director Lloyd L. Carlson of a local advertising company that had previously worked on the Expo '74 logo. The first flag to be produced with the new design was completed in March 1976 by two members of the St. John's Episcopal Church and presented two months later to a delegation from Nishinomiya, Spokane's sister city in Japan.

A second flag was made by members of the Spokane Falls Needlework Guild over a two-month period before an annual stitchery convention in March 1977. The city flag was rarely displayed for several decades, with occasional use at city hall and at the Avista headquarters in the 1990s. A banner with the flag and a secondary design for the city's centennial was taken in 1981 to Mount Everest by Chris Kopczynski, who was the first Spokanite to climb the mountain. The city flag was moved from storage to the city hall's conference room in 2012 by Spokane mayor David Condon shortly after he took office.

The 1975 flag consisted of a white field with diagonal bands of chartreuse green and aqua blue that run from the hoist to bottom center. The two colors were derived from the Expo '74 logo and are unusual in flags, according to the North American Vexillological Association. At the center is a black ring with four children, rendered as stick figures, captioned with "Children of the Sun", the meaning of "Spokane" in the indigenous Salish language. The center ring is joined by a golden sun in the top right corner, and the text "City of Spokane" is to the bottom right in all capital letters.

=== Fourth flag: 2021–present ===
In a 2004 survey of city flags in the United States by members of the North American Vexillological Association, the Spokane flag ranked 111th out of 150 overall, with an average score of 3.15 out of 10 points. A resolution sponsored by city councilmember Kate Burke proposing the creation of a task force for designing a new flag was passed unanimously by the city council in June 2019. The Spokane Flag Commission was formed in December 2019 and consists of ten local residents representing the city government, Spokane tribal government, arts commission, and vexillologists.

In September 2020, the Spokane Flag Commission began a month-long contest to solicit flag designs from the public for review and a later public vote among selected finalists. The contest allowed for three submissions per person and required a simple design meeting basic criteria set by vexillologists on the flag commission. Over 400 designs were submitted during the contest, which were ranked by the public in a December 2020 survey, and a field of 12 finalists were selected by the Flag Commission. The finalists were announced in March 2021 and a month-long online ranked-choice vote was opened the following month for Spokane Public Library cardholders and members of the Spokane Tribe of Indians.

The winning design, announced by the Spokane Flag Commission on May 10, was submitted by local graphic designer Derek Landers and features white and green field separated by a representation of the Spokane River. A total of 2,110 votes were cast in the online vote, which took ten rounds until the winning design earned a 56 percent majority. The city council passed a resolution to adopt the new flag on June 14 (Flag Day) ahead of an official unveiling the following day.
