= List of mayors of Spokane =

Mayor of Spokane
- Flag of Spokane, Washington

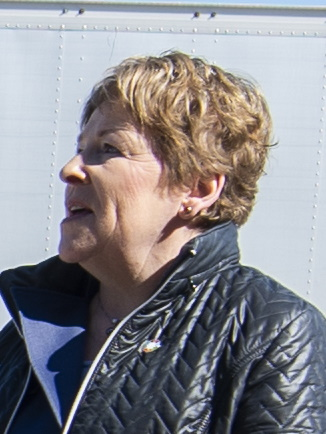
- Incumbent; Lisa Brown since January 2, 2024
- Status: Her Honor; The Honorable

The mayor of Spokane is the chief executive of city government in Spokane, Washington, the 96th largest city in the United States. The mayor oversees the management and administration of various local government departments. Historically, the mayor of Spokane has had different powers under different forms of government. From its founding until 1960, Spokane used a commission system. On March 8, 1960, voters overwhelmingly approved the adoption of a city manager system, which gave the role of city manager most powers. In 2001, Spokane switched to the currently used strong mayor form of government, giving more power to the mayor as chief executive.

== List ==
=== Pre-strong mayor system (1881–2001) ===
#	Photo	Mayor	Term start	Term end
1		Robert W. Forrest	1881	1882
2		James N. Glover	1883	1884
3		Anthony M. Cannon	1885	1886
4		William H. Taylor	1887	1888
5		Jacob Hoover	1888	1889
6		Francis M. Tull	1889	1889
7		Isaac S. Kaufman	1889	1889
8		Fred Furth	1889	1890
9		Charles F. Clough	1890	1891
10		David B. Fotheringham	1891	1892
11		Daniel M. Drumheller	1892	1893
12		Edward L. Powell	1893	1894
13		Horatio N. Belt	1894	1896
14		Elmer D. Olmsted	1897	1898
15		James M. Comstock	1898	1901
16		Patrick S. Byrne	1901	1903
17		L. Frank Boyd	1903	1905
18		Floyd L. Daggett	1905–1907	
19		C. Herbert Moore	1907	1909
20		Nelson S. Pratt	1909	1911
21		William J. Hindley	1911	1913
22		Charles M. Fassett	1914	1916
23		Charles A. Fleming	1916	1917
24		Charles M. Fassett	1918	1920
25		Charles A. Fleming	1920	1929
26		Leonard Funk	1929	1935
27		Arthur W. Burch	1935	1937
28		Frank G. Sutherlin (Sr.)	1937	1945
29		Otto A. Dirkes	1945	1946
30		Arthur Meehan	1945	1955
31		Willard Taft	1955	1958
32		Frank G. Sutherlin (Jr.)	1958	1960
33		Kenneth Lawson	1960	1960
34		Neal R. Fosseen	1960	1967
35		David H. Rodgers	1967	1978
36		Ron Bair	1978	1982
37		James Everett Chase	1982	1986
38		Vicki McNeill	1986	1990
39		Sheri S. Barnard	1990	1994
40		Jack Geraghty	1994	1998
41		John Talbott	1998	2000

=== Strong mayor system (2001–present) ===
Spokane adopted the "strong mayor" form of government in January 2001.

#	Photo	Mayor	Term	Party (Note: Per the Washington State Constitution, mayors are technically nonpartisan, but mayors still often associate with political parties.)	Election	Notes
42		John Powers	December 28, 2000 – December 23, 2003	Democratic	2000	Elected to a truncated term of three years due to the switch to the strong mayor system.
43		James E. West	December 23, 2003 – December 16, 2005	Republican	2003	Recalled in 2005 over allegations of sexual abuse.
44		Dennis P. Hession	December 16, 2005 – November 27, 2007	Democratic	—	Appointed by the city council as mayor following West's recall in 2005.
45		Mary Verner	November 27, 2007 – December 30, 2011	Democratic	2007	
46		David Condon	December 30, 2011 – December 30, 2019	Republican	2011	
46		David Condon	December 30, 2011 – December 30, 2019	Republican	2015	
47		Nadine Woodward	December 30, 2019 – January 2, 2024	Republican	2019	
48		Lisa Brown	January 2, 2024 – present	Democratic	2023	

== See also ==
- City government in Washington (state)
