= 2011 Spokane mayoral election =

- November 8, 2011
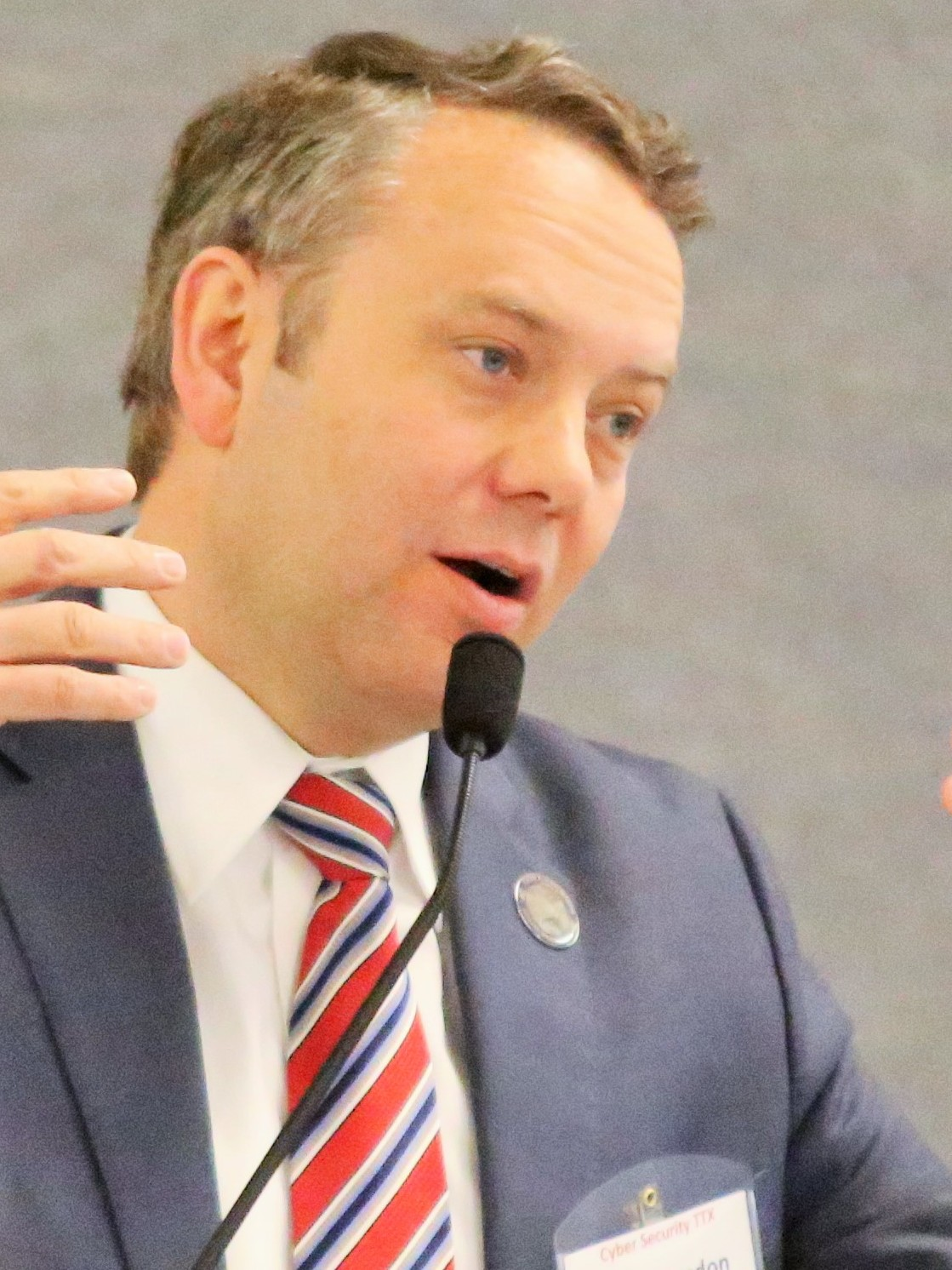

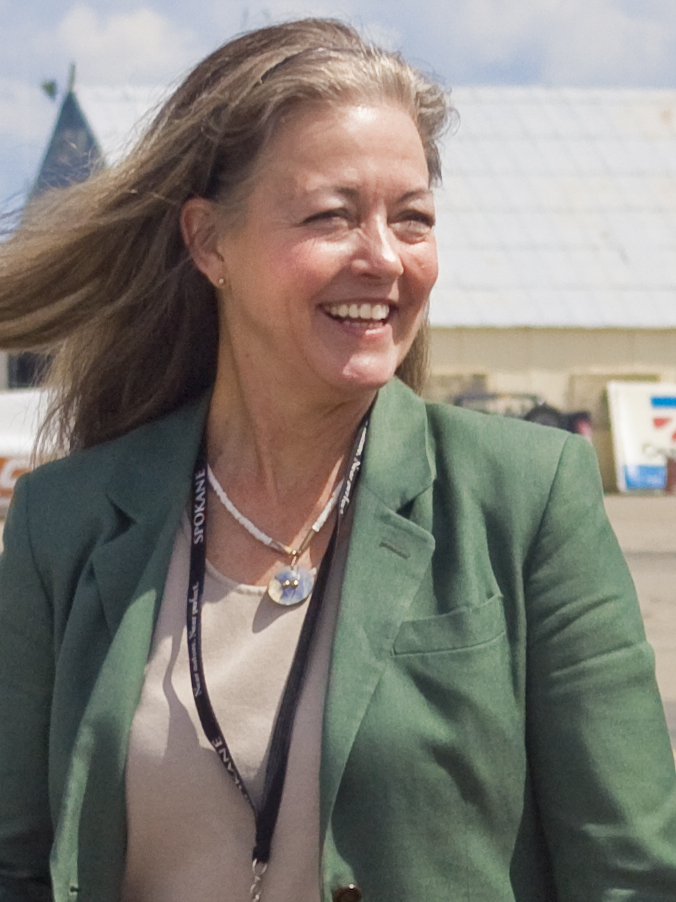
Candidate	David Condon	Mary Verner
Party	Nonpartisan	Nonpartisan
Popular vote	31,926	29,025
Percentage	52.38%	47.62%
Mayor before election
Mary Verner
Democratic
Elected Mayor
David Condon
Republican

The 2011 Spokane mayoral election took place on November 8, 2011, to elect the mayor of Spokane, Washington. It saw David Condon unseat incumbent mayor Mary Verner.

== Results ==
=== Primary ===
Washington has a nonpartisan blanket primary system. The top two-finishers in the primary face each other in the general election.

The primary was held on August 16, 2011.

Primary results
Candidate	Votes	%
Mary Verner (incumbent)	20,480	59.27
David Condon	11,595	33.56
Michael J. Noder	1,225	3.55
Barbara Lampert	869	2.51
Robert A. Kroboth	384	1.11
Total votes	34,553	

=== General election ===
General election results
Candidate	Votes	%
David Condon	31,926	52.38
Mary Verner (incumbent)	29,025	47.62
Total votes	60,951	
