= Vernon L. Grose =

American aerospace engineer

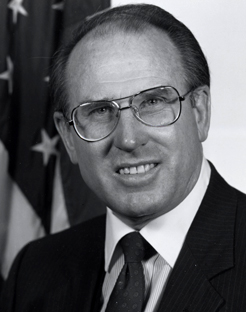
- Born: June 27, 1928; Spokane, Washington, U.S.
- Died: April 14, 2025 (aged 96)
- Education: Whitworth University (B.S.); University of Southern California (M.S.); Vanguard University (Honorary D.Sc.)
- Occupations: Safety and Risk Management Consultant
- Years active: 1952–?
- Employer(s): Omega Systems Group (Founder and Chairman)
- Known for: Member of the National Transportation Safety Board, NASA's Safety Advisory Group for Space Flight, and National Highway Safety Advisory Committee; and providing testimony before the California State Board of Education regarding the California Science Framework
- Political party: Republican
- Board member of: National Transportation Safety Board
- Spouse: Phyllis Jean Heine
- Children: 6
- Parent(s): Wesley Grose; Pearl Quantz
- Awards: NASA's Silver Snoopy Award (1974)

Vernon Leslie Grose (born June 27, 1928) was an American author, academic, aerospace engineer, air disaster analyst, risk management expert, and former member of the National Transportation Safety Board (NTSB). In 1969, he was appointed to NASA's Safety Advisory Group for Space Flight. In 1974, he was honored with NASA's Silver Snoopy Award, presented by Brigadier General Thomas P. Stafford, veteran astronaut of the Gemini 6A, Gemini 9A, and Apollo 10 space programs.

In 1983, he was appointed by President Ronald Reagan to the National Transportation Safety Board, where he pioneered the concept of multiple causation of accidents. Following his appointment to the NTSB, he was appointed to serve as a member of the National Highway Safety Advisory Committee. In 1997, Vice President Al Gore requested his assistance and expertise on the White House Commission on Aviation Safety and Security. Following the September 11 attacks on the World Trade Center and the crash of United Airlines Flight 93 in Pennsylvania, Grose testified before the US Congress on behalf of the NTSB, presenting findings of the Board's formal investigation into the attacks.

Grose served as an executive and consultant with several organizations and corporations. As of 2013, he served as the Chairman of Omega Systems Group in Arlington, Virginia. He provided keynote addresses and lectured in academic, government, and religious settings for over 50 years. He also served as a member of the faculty, adjunct professor, and guest lecturer at universities throughout the world, including Germany, Mexico, China, Spain, and the US. In 1969, he garnered national press when he addressed the California State Board of Education regarding science guidelines for teaching science and evolution in the public school system. He successfully proposed academic guidelines that supported teaching creation as a scientific theory, alongside the teaching of evolution. As a result of the Board of Education's decision to incorporate alternative scientific theories into their curriculum, other states throughout the US followed suit and revised their academic guidelines accordingly.

== Personal background ==
Vernon Leslie Grose was born on June 27, 1928, in Spokane, Washington. He was the son of Wesley and Pearl (née Quantz) Grose. His father was an automobile mechanic, while his mother was a telephone operator for the Pacific Northwest Bell Telephone Company. His siblings include sister, Lois, and brother, Gerald. Grose was raised in northwest Spokane, graduating from North Central High School in 1946. In 1997, Grose was honored as an inaugural recipient of the North Central High School Distinguished Alumnus Award. Fellow recipients included Spokane Mayor, Jack Geraghty; US Congressman, George Nethercutt; Jerry Sage, WWII prisoner of war portrayed by Steve McQueen in the movie, the Great Escape; and musician Don Eagle, who toured with the USO during WWII and appeared in A Connecticut Yankee in King Arthur's Court (with fellow-Spokanite Bing Crosby), Night Has a Thousand Eyes (with Edward G. Robinson), and The Strip (with Mickey Rooney).

Following high school, Grose enrolled at Whitworth University in north Spokane, earning a Bachelor of Science degree in Physics in 1950. He served as a member of Whitworth's Alumni Association Board of Directors from 1968 to 1970. Whitworth University honored him with the 2013 Distinguished Alumni Award. He earned the Master of Science degree in Systems Management in 1967, from the University of Southern California.

In 1973, Grose received an honorary Doctor of Science degree from Southern California College, for his work in "forcing re-examination of scientific objectivity regarding the origin of the universe, life and man". In conferring the degree, the school president, Emil A. Balliet stated of Grose, "He has the rare and unusual ability to discern the broad issues in the world at many levels and he has the skill to go directly to the heart of the problem. Most impressive has been his leadership role in establishing the case for design as opposed to the case for chance in the study of origins in California State public school textbooks."

Grose graduated from Whitworth University three weeks before North Korea's invasion of South Korea. In 1951, following his graduation, he began serving with the United States Air Force. In 1952, he was commissioned as an Electronics Officer, later serving in Technical Intelligence with the Air Force Reserve. He retired in 1972 with the rank of captain.

He married Phyllis Jean Heine in Spokane on April 14, 1951, at the First Assembly of God church. Together, they had six children, Rhonda Susan Chumley, Brenda Ruth Tutmarc, Lynnda Lorelle Owens, Wesley Paul Grose, Bradley Wayne Grose, and Nanette Jill Shotwell. In 1959, Grose moved to California, where they lived through 1983. They relocated to the Washington D.C. area in 1983, when he was sworn into public office with the National Transportation Safety Board. As of 2013, Grose and his wife resided in Arlington, Virginia.

== Professional background ==
=== Aerospace engineering ===
In 1952, following his graduation from Whitworth University, Grose joined the staff at Boeing, working with the Applied Physics department. While at Boeing, he wrote the test documentation for the Minuteman intercontinental ballistic thermonuclear missile. He was also responsible for Boeing's initial testing, which utilized three separate and dynamic environments at the same time. He remained with Boeing through 1959. After working with Boeing, Grose joined the staff of Litton Industries in Woodland Hills, California, where he served as the Director of Reliability and Program Manager of Project SPARR, an Air Force program designed to address general and applied research problems related to space systems. He was responsible for overseeing an applied research space systems risk management program on behalf of the United States Air Force.

Grose joined the staff of Northrop Ventura in Rancho El Conejo, California, in 1962, serving as the Director of Applied Technology. In this role, he was responsible for test activities for the engineering department. He participated in the Mercury, Gemini, and Apollo projects of the National Aeronautics Space Administration (NASA), overseeing the chemistry, metallurgy, reliability, configuration management, and value engineering of the program. In 1964, he transferred to Rocketdyne, which was a division of Rockwell International. At Rocketdyne, located in Van Nuys, Grose was named the Chief of Reliability, where he continued to focus on North American aviation, specifically participating in the development of the Gemini and Apollo space programs.

=== Academia and public speaking ===
Grose has provided keynote addresses and lectured in academic, government, and religious settings for over 50 years. In 1967, he was named the Vice President of Tustin Institute of Technology (now known as Technical Training, Inc.), located in Santa Barbara, California. He was responsible for the development of management curricula and system technology studies. While serving as Vice President of the school through 1981, Grose provided training for management of eight NASA field centers, including Kennedy Space Center, Marshall Space Flight Center, Ames Research Center, Dryden Flight Research Center at Edwards Air Force Base, Lewis Research Center, Langley Research Center, Goddard Space Flight Center, and the Lyndon B. Johnson Space Center in Houston, Texas.

He has served as a member of the faculty, adjunct professor, and guest lecturer at universities throughout the world, including Germany, China, Spain, and the US. He served as an adjunct professor with USC in Los Angeles from 1967–1969. He taught Physics and Chemistry of Aircraft & Missile Propulsion at the University of Southern California (USC) Graduate School at Ramstein Air Base in Germany, in 1967. He then taught Space Technology and Management of Research, Development, Test & Evaluation from 1968 to 1969, at Torrejón Air Base in Madrid and Morón Air Base in Seville, Spain, again on behalf of USC's Graduate School.

In 1968, Grose began teaching Continuing Education courses in the School of Engineering and Applied Science at George Washington University in Washington, D.C., remaining there for 15 years. During this time, he taught classes in Risk Management, System Safety, Medical Risk, Systems Management. In 1981, he was invited to lecture students in Systematic Management of Risk at the Chinese Academy of Sciences in the People's Republic of China.

He taught for UCLA in its Mexican Institute of Development course in Mexico City in 1976.

As California governor, Ronald Reagan, appointed Grose to several state government committees, councils, and boards focusing on a range of issues from the implementation of technology to addressing and resolving socio-economic and judicial problems. Appointments were made to the Governor's Select Committee on Law Enforcement Problems, serving from 1972 to 1973; the California Council on Criminal Justice, serving from 1971 to 1973; and the Board of Directors of the California Crime Technological Research Foundation, serving from 1972 to 1975. In 1972, he was appointed to the California Curriculum Development Commission, which is responsible for approving textbooks and curriculum for public schools throughout the state. He served on the Commission through 1975.

From 1980 to 1991, Grose served as an expert consultant and lecturer on behalf of the American Society of Safety Engineers of Des Plaines, Illinois.

In addition to academic settings, Grose spoke at local and regional religious conferences on behalf of the Assemblies of God, International Church of the Foursquare Gospel, and the Full Gospel Businessmen's Fellowship International.

=== Safety and risk management ===
As a result of his background and expertise in aeronautical and aerospace risk management and analysis, Grose has received presidential and federal appointments to various panels and committees addressing risk and safety measures related to aircraft and maritime disasters. In 1969, Wernher von Braun, director of the Marshall Space Flight Center, appointed Grose to serve a two-year term on NASA's Safety Advisory Group for Space Flight in Huntsville, Alabama. Under von Braun's leadership, he served as a member of the team that designed the Saturn V booster rocket, which served as the launching vehicle on the Apollo spacecraft, enabling the first landing of men on the Moon.

Grose was appointed to the Panel on Human Error in Merchant Marine Safety in 1972, by the National Academy of Sciences. Six years later, in 1978, he was appointed to the Committee on Research Needs to Reduce Maritime Collisions, Rammings, and Groundings. That same year, he was also appointed to the Panel on Causes and Prevention of Grain Elevator Explosions.

He was honored with NASA's Silver Snoopy Award in 1974, in recognition of professional service related to spaceflight safety and mission success, specifically for providing "interesting and highly motivational insight into the management aspects of system safety as applied to space programs". The certificate awarded additionally thanks Grose for support provided to the NASA astronauts through his lectures and was presented at the Lyndon B. Johnson Space Center, by Brigadier General Thomas P. Stafford, veteran astronaut of the Gemini 6A, Gemini 9A, and Apollo 10 manned spaceflights, as well as the Apollo–Soyuz joint US-Soviet space mission.

In 1983, President Ronald Reagan appointed Grose to a two-year term as a member of the National Transportation Safety Board (NTSB), in recognition of his professional background and comprehensive knowledge of air, land, and sea modes of travel and transportation. As a member of the NTSB, he oversaw the organization's investigation of major accidents. From 1984 to 1985, he served through the White House as an expert consultant assigned to NASA's chief engineer in Washington D.C. In 1985, he was assigned to serve as a consultant to the EPA Associate Administrator for Research and Development. In 1986, President Reagan appointed Grose to the National Highway Safety Advisory Commission, which serves under the direction of the National Highway Traffic Safety Administration.

Grose founded Omega Systems Group in 1995. He served as the chairman of the organization from 1981–83, and again from 1986 to the present. The organization offers consulting in risk management and loss prevention, along with providing expertise witness services. Omega Systems Group is known for developing management risk methodology for use by organizations in a variety of fields. Under the guidance of Grose, the organization designed and developed a risk management methodology, known as SMART (Systems Methodology Applied to Risk Termination). The technique is a corporate budget system for addressing and mitigating legal, political, social, economic, and technological loss. The system has been used by AT&T, Exxon, NASA, and the Washington Metropolitan Area Transit Authority. (need details and independent source) In 1984, SMART was successfully utilized to combat terrorism at the Summer Olympics in Los Angeles. (details and need independent source)

In 1997, Vice President Al Gore requested his assistance and expertise on the White House Commission on Aviation Safety and Security, which was established by President Bill Clinton following the TWA Flight 800 disaster over the Atlantic Ocean on July 17, 1996. Also known as the Gore Commission, the study was organized and designed to review and implement strategies to improve civil aviation safety, ensure aviation security, and modernize air traffic control policies, standards, and technologies. After gathering recommendations, which primarily focused on increasing security measures, the Commission finalized its report and forwarded it to President Clinton, eight months after the disaster. As a result of the study, Congress earmarked over $400 million to enhance commercial airlines with improved security measures and new explosives detection technology. (need independent source)

== California Science Framework ==
Another wave of controversy occurred during this period, and that was the teaching of evolution in the public schools, and other science concepts and ideas that touched on beliefs, religion, values and morals (e.g. teaching human sexuality, human reproduction, and birth control in biology classes, for example). But it was Darwin's evolutionary theory that resulted in court cases, and laws being passed to regulate the teaching of evolution (such as giving equal time to "creation science" if "evolution science" was presented in a science class.

A phenomenon that reached its pinnacle during this time was the general scrutiny of textbooks, especially in biology, Earth science, social studies, and literature. In the 1960s, when BSCS, whose textbooks emphasized Darwin's theory of evolution (in contrast to many high school biology texts as the time), submitted its books for state adoption in the lucrative market of Texas, serious trouble surfaced. The Reverend Ruel Lemmons led a protest (that reached the Texas Governor's office) to the get the BSCS textbooks banned claiming the books were pure evolution, completely materialistic and atheistic. The books were not banned, but there were changes made to lighten their evolutionary emphasis. Nelkin reports that BSCS had to specify that evolution theory was a theory, not a fact, and that it had been modified, not strengthened by recent research.

Further, a group of fundamentalists began to develop a world view of creation based on the story in Genesis in the Holy Bible. The creationists rejected the notion of a 5 billion year old Earth, instead claiming that biological life began approximately five to six thousand years ago. One of the forceful voices in the creation science movement was Henry Morris. In an article published in the American Biology Teacher, he set out the differences, from his point of view, between the creation model and the evolution model. Essentially the creationists "theorized" that all living things were brought about by the acts of a Creator. The evolutionary model proposed that all living things were brought about by naturalistic processes due to properties inherent in inanimate matter. The creationists, in their literature, set the creation model alongside the evolutionary model, and insisted that good science education would provide alternative views on the same topic, and let the students evaluate them to form their own position.

In 1969, the California State Advisory Committee on Science Education, appointed by the California State Board of Education, compiled and presented a set of recommendations and proposed curriculum guidelines for public school science courses. This report was entitled "The Science Framework for California Schools". The Science Framework on Science for California Schools sets forth the guidelines for the adoption of science textbooks (currently over $40 million are spent on science books in California during the science adoption year). Grose wrote and presented a document arguing that evolutionary theory was biased and should be taught only if alternative views were presented. He convinced the board of education to modify its position on the teaching of evolution. The Board modified the Science Framework on Science for California Schools so that the theory of creation would be included in textbooks. The board inserted the following statement into the framework:

The "evolutionists were incredulous that creationists could have any influence." A number of individuals and groups such as National Association of Biology Teachers (NABT), the National Academy of Science, and the Academic Senate of the University of California protested and lobbied against the state board's ruling. The solution to the creation - evolution issue resulted only after the state board had received numerous complaints about the earlier decision. In 1972 the California Board of Education decided to approve a statement prepared by its curriculum committee by proposing neutrality in science textbooks. Dogmatic statements in science books would be removed, and replaced with conditional statements. Textbooks dealing with evolution would have printed in them a statement indicating that science cannot answer all questions about origins, and that evolution is a theory, not a fact. Some textbooks, even in the 1990s, contain statements to this effect, usually printed on the inside cover. The effect of this policy change prevented textbook publishers from having to include in science books, a section on "creation science." The board's decision, which was called the Antidogmatism Statement, caused publishers to rethink the way they were presenting science information in textbooks.

Grose spoke before the California State Board of Education in 1969, addressing science guidelines for teaching science and evolution in the public school system, specifically in regards to teaching evolution as fact, while failing to consider or include other theories within the curriculum. In response to the encounter and resulting publicity, he established The Alpha Foundation, which serves families and the academic community by researching and publishing scientific materials in correlation with teaching creation as a scientific theory, alongside the teaching of evolution. As a result of the California State Board of Education's decision to incorporate alternative scientific theories within the student curriculum, other states throughout the US followed suit and revised their academic guidelines. In accordance with the Board's decision, the following content was added to the California Science Framework, affecting the teaching of science in K-12 classrooms in public schools throughout the US:

All scientific evidence to date concerning the origin of life implies at least a dualism or the necessity to use several theories to fully explain the relationships between established data points. This dualism is not unique to this field of study, but is also appropriate in other scientific disciplines such as the physics of light. While the Bible and other philosophical treatises also mention creation, science has independently postulated the various theories of creation. Therefore creation in scientific terms is not a religious or philosophical belief. Also note that creation and evolutionary theories are not necessarily mutual exclusives. Some of the scientific data, for example the regular absence of transitional forms, may be best explained by a creation theory, while other data, for example transmutation of species, substantiate a process of evolution.

In order to recoup its position as an active force in science education, the NSF prepared a report in 1980 entitled Science and Engineering Education for the 1980s and Beyond to the Carter administration. Unfortunately (for NSF) Carter was defeated, and the new president, Ronald Reagan rejected the reports recommendations, and tried to eliminate the science education section of NSF, and during the early 80s, the influence of NSF in science education was limited to college faculty improvement and graduate student fellowships in the basic sciences.

== Board and association memberships ==
- 1966–1968: National Aviation Show and Aerospace Exhibition
- 1968–1970: Whitworth University Alumni Association
- 1972–1975: Southern California College of Costa Mesa

== Honors, appointments, and awards ==
- 1969: Appointment to the NASA Safety Advisory Group for Space Flight by Wernher von Braun
- 1971: Appointment to the California Council on Criminal Justice by Governor Ronald Reagan
- 1972: Appointment to the Panel on Human Error in Merchant Marine Safety by the National Academy of Sciences
- 1972: Appointment to the California Crime Technological Research Foundation by Governor Ronald Reagan
- 1972: Appointment to the Governor's Select Committee on Law Enforcement Problems by Governor Ronald Reagan
- 1972: Appointment to the California Curriculum Development Commission by Government Ronald Reagan
- 1973: Recipient of an honorary Doctor of Science degree from Southern California College.
- 1974: Recipient of NASA's Silver Snoopy Award, presented by Brigadier General Thomas P. Stafford
- 1978: Appointment to the Committee on Research Needs to Reduce Maritime Collisions, Rammings, and Groundings by the National Academy of Sciences
- 1978: Appointment to the Panel on Causes and Prevention of Grain Elevator Explosions by the National Academy of Sciences
- 1981: Addressed the Academy of Sciences in Beijing at the invitation of the People's Republic of China
- 1983: Appointment to the National Transportation Safety Board by President Ronald Reagan
- 1986: Appointment to the National Highway Safety Advisory Commission by President Ronald Reagan
- 2005: Delivered the keynote address at NASA Marshall Space Flight Center's Safety Day
- 2013: Recipient of Whitworth University's 2013 Distinguished Alumni Award

== Professional fellowships ==
- Center for Infrastructure Protection and Homeland Security
- American Institute of Aeronautics and Astronautics

== Media appearances ==
Grose regularly appeared on various news media programs, providing commentary pertaining to current events in relation to risk and analysis of aviation crashes, terrorist attacks, and major domestic and international disasters. He gave over 100 interviews on CNN, providing commentary as their Risk and Aviation Analyst. He was a featured guest on the NBC morning television program, Today, Good Morning America, Prime Time Live, NBC Nightly News, Hardball with Chris Matthews, ABC 20/20, CTV News Channel, BBC News (London), and The O'Reilly Factor on the Fox News Channel. Overall, he appeared in over 300 interviews, providing analysis and reports current events and disasters, including the 1996 explosion of TWA Flight 800, Air France Flight 447, Swissair Flight 111, Egyptair Flight 990, AIRES Colombia Flight 8250, Garuda Indonesia Flight 152, and the crash that killed John F. Kennedy Jr. and his passengers. On September 11, 2001, his interview with Fox News was being televised at the moment that United Airlines Flight 175 flew into the World Trade Center Tower 2. Articles presenting his analysis of current events and disasters have been published in Time Magazine, USA Today, U.S. News & World Report, the Chicago Tribune, the Los Angeles Times, the Washington Post, and the Christian Science Monitor.

== Filmography ==
- 2004: Conspiracy? (TV series documentary reporting on the crash of TWA Flight 800) as himself/former National Transportation Safety Board Member
- 2007: Best Evidence (TV series documentary reporting on the crash of TWA Flight 800) as himself/former National Transportation Safety Board Member

== Published works ==
- Grose, Vernon L. (1987). Managing Risk: Systematic Loss Prevention for Executives, Prentice Hall, 404 pages. ISBN 978-0135511107
- Grose, Vernon L. (2006). Science But Not Scientists, AuthorHouse, 740 pages. ISBN 978-1425969929
- Grose, Vernon L. (2012). Purpose in a Random World, Amazon Digital Services, ASIN B00AB85LT6
