= Dennis P. Hession =

American attorney and adjunct professor of law

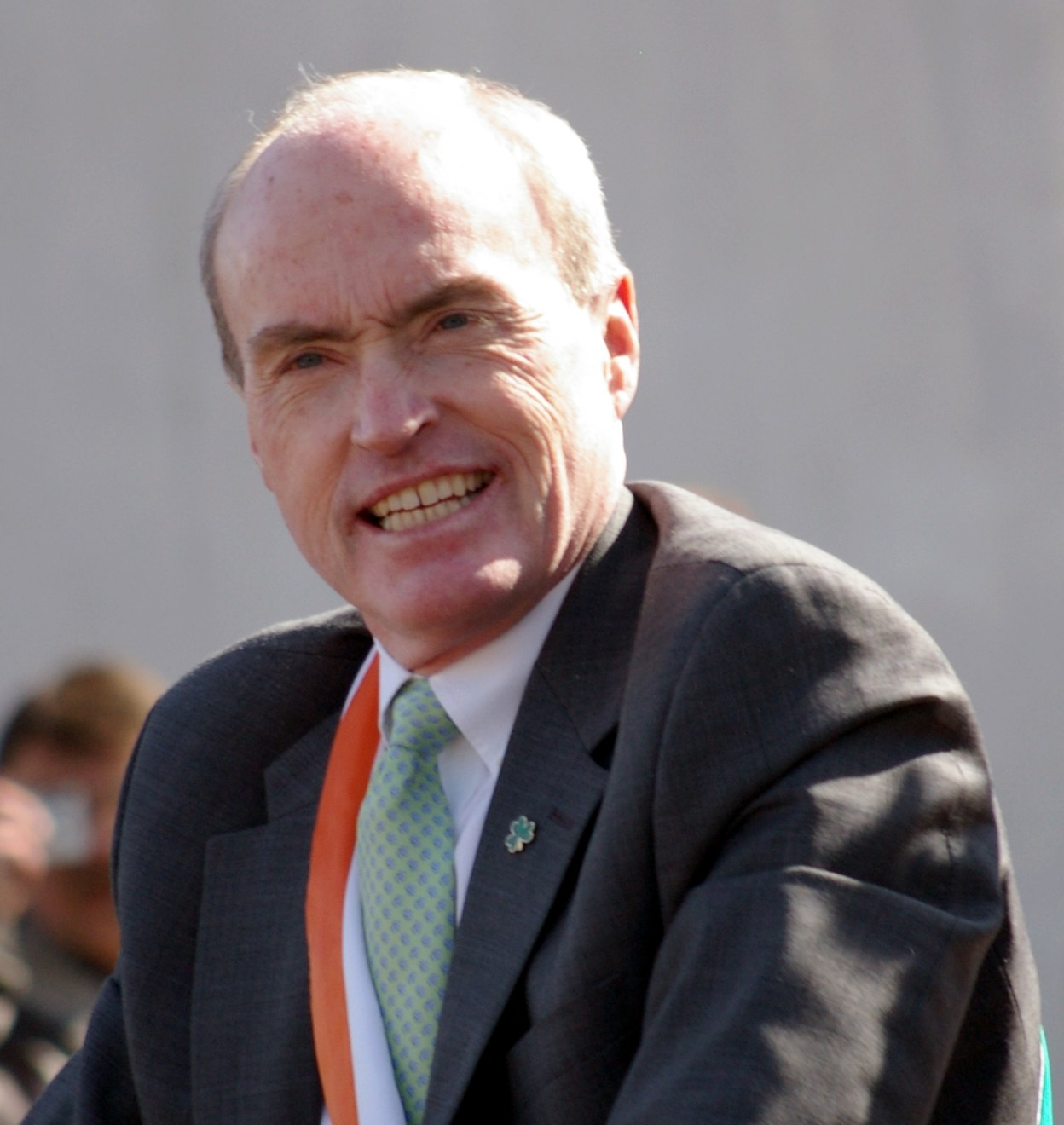

44th Mayor of Spokane
- In office December 16, 2005 – December 30, 2007
- Preceded by: James E. West
- Succeeded by: Mary Verner

Personal details
- Born: 1950 (age 75–76) Salt Lake City, Utah, U.S.
- Party: Democratic
- Education: Gonzaga University (J.D.)
- Profession: Attorney

Dennis P. Hession (born 1950, Salt Lake City, Utah) is an American attorney and adjunct professor of law at Gonzaga University School of Law, who was appointed mayor of Spokane, Washington for nearly two years. He became mayor pro tem on December 16, 2005, when a special election to recall Mayor James E. West was certified (West having been recalled after involvement in a sex scandal).

Hession was officially appointed mayor by the City Council on January 3, 2006, to serve the remainder of West's term in office. He unsuccessfully sought election to the appointed position, conceding the election to city council member, Mary Verner, on the evening of November 9, 2007. Prior to becoming mayor pro tem he had served for four years on the Spokane City Council. In 2004 he was elected City Council President.

Preceded by James E. West	Mayor of Spokane, Washington; 2005–2007	Succeeded by Mary Verner
