= Women's and Gender Education Center (Eastern Washington University) =

Center at Eastern Washington University

The Women's and Gender Education Center at Eastern Washington University was established in 1977 as the EWU Women's Center, and has continued to serve students at EWU since that time. The center is part of the Women's and Gender Studies Program.

== Creation of the Center ==
Eastern Washington University's Women's and Gender Education Center, or WAGE, opened officially on October 5, 1977 in Monroe Hall on the Cheney campus. Then called the Women's Center, its first director was Dr. Pat Coontz. The Center was part of the Women's Program, which coordinated the activities of an academic program for Women's Studies with the Center's programming for Eastern Washington University students, faculty, staff, and the greater Cheney community. Pat Coontz also created the Women's Center to break the stigma of women being viewed in the role of wife and mother, and to create an empowering environment to be recognized as a powerful leader in her community.

== History of the Center ==
As the name of the Center suggests, its intention was to support research in women's studies. In addition to supporting scholarship, discussions, counseling, and lectures were on the agenda. In the student newspaper's "Faculty Forum" column on January 19, 1978, Pat Coontz shot down the "Women's Libber" stereotype, noting that extremist views were not characteristic of the majority of feminists. She then called out her male colleagues for contributing to a sexist campus culture. These colleagues, were "good union men, interested in a better future for everyone" yet referred to their "Farrah Fawcett-looking students" as "chicks" and "dolls." The Center's name has changed over time: originally the Women's Center from the fall of 1977 until about June 1989, it was renamed the EWU Women Studies Center in September 1989. It received its current name, the Women's and Gender Education Center, in the fall of 2017.

The main objective of the center is to provide an area for women and non-binary identities with resources and the opportunity to promote in-depth academic and scholarly research on issues relating to women and gender. Ultimately a main goal of the WAGE Center is to educate people about women's status, lend assistance in cases of discrimination, and support the strengthening of women's ideals.

== Programs and activities ==
Annually, the Women's & Gender Studies Program hosts Contemporary Issues in Feminist Research presentation series in which faculty present research in their discipline from a feminist perspective. The Women's Studies Challenge to Tradition was a four day conference, starting May 4, 1978 to May 7, 1978, that brought together members of the general public and scholars from the Northwest to discuss research and developments in women's studies. The keynote speaker for the symposium was Fanny Howe, who spoke on the need to reexamine curricula biased toward a male perspective. There were 15 panels and workshops that discussed different topics such as women under stress, women and work in a technological age, women and politics, history's lost achievements, women in the arts and sciences, the language of sexism, single parent families and the impact of feminism on the church.

In 1986 from October 17–19, Eastern hosted the Northwest Women's Studies Association Conference, featuring keynote speaker and contemporary feminist Nawal El-Saadawi.

The H.O.M.E. (Helping Ourselves Means Education) Program is a self-help network that provides resources for students who are typically low-income parents. H.O.M.E. connects students to a network of volunteer staff, faculty, and administrators.

On October 17–19, 1986, a conference was held and it dealt with the energy of women in building and giving birth to their communities on a local level, as well as nationally and internationally.

Programs offered in the spring quarter of 1977 were sexism in counseling, women in art, racism and sexism, and women and social reform.

Currently, The Women's and Gender Education Center offers a bi-annual leadership seminar to the students of Eastern Washington University. This one day seminar, including local community leaders, celebrates the successes and challenges of women in and around Spokane. This seminar allows ideas to bloom in a safe environment and vital connections are made. The WAGE Center continually connects women to resources within the University and out in the local area.

== Directors of Women's Studies and Women's and Gender Studies Program and Managers of the Center ==
=== Directors of Women's Studies and Women's and Gender Studies ===
- Pat Coontz (1977-1983)
- Joan Niemann, Interim Director during Coontz's sabbatical (1980-1981)
- Lisa Brown, Acting Director (1983)
- Lee Swedberg (1983-1998)
- Sally Winkle (1998-2018)
- Judy Rohrer (2018-)

=== Managers ===
- Sherrie Holland (1983)
- Margaret Craford (1983-1984)
- Chris Jacox (1984-1990)
- Carol Vines (1990-2015)
- Lisa Logan (2015-)
