= John Powers (mayor) =

American politician

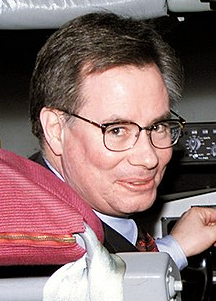
- Powers in 2002

42nd Mayor of Spokane
- In office December 28, 2000 – December 30, 2003
- Preceded by: John Talbott
- Succeeded by: James E. West

Personal details
- Born: 1952 (age 73–74) Wisconsin, U.S.
- Party: Democratic
- Spouse: Bonnie Powers
- Children: 4
- Education: Gonzaga University

John Powers is an American politician who served as the 42nd mayor of Spokane, Washington from 2000 to 2003. He was the first mayor to serve under the strong mayor form of government.

He beat incumbent John Talbott in 2000, and served as mayor until losing in the 2003 mayoral primary to journalist Tom Grant and future mayor Jim West. Powers finished third in the primary and was unable to continue to the general election. Though the position of mayor is officially non-partisan, Powers is considered a Democrat.

== Early life and education ==
Powers is originally from Wisconsin, before moving to Spokane in 1980. He studied law at Gonzaga University and worked as a bankruptcy lawyer prior to becoming mayor.

== Tenure ==
Heading into the 2000 election, the major three candidates for the primary were incumbent mayor John Talbott, Powers, and then-state senator Jim West. Talbott and West were expected to move to the general election, however Powers had a surprising upset, garnering over 40% of the vote. In the general, Powers was elected as the first strong mayor of Spokane, a position that was created by popular vote a year earlier. The center focus of the election was on the construction of River Park Square in downtown Spokane. Talbott's aggressive stance against the project compared to Power's approach of mediation was seen as a major reason for his victory in the general election.

By 2003, Powers had still been unable to resolve the River Park Square development, and his inexperience was seen as a drag on his ability to govern. Powers was ousted as mayor in the primary among a crowded field including former mayor Sheri Bernard, newscaster Tom Grant, and state senator Jim West. Grant and West continued to the general, with West becoming the next mayor.

Powers was a speculative candidate to run against U.S. Representative George Nethercutt in 2002 or 2004, but he never ran in either election.

== Personal life ==
After leaving office, Powers moved to Seattle to become president of the Economic Development Council of Seattle and King County from 2004 to 2007. From 2011 to 2020, he served the executive director of the Kitsap Economic Development Alliance. In 2020, Powers retired and returned to Spokane.

Preceded by John Talbott	Mayor of Spokane, Washington; 2000–2003	Succeeded by James E. West (politician)
