= James E. West (politician) =

American politician (1951–2006)

Jim West
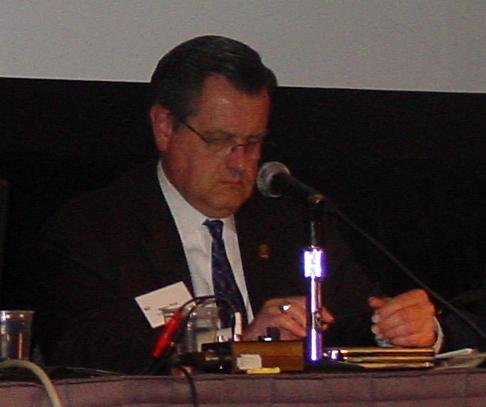

Mayor of Spokane
- In office December 30, 2003 – December 16, 2005
- Preceded by: John Powers
- Succeeded by: Dennis P. Hession

Majority Leader of the Washington Senate
- In office January 13, 2003 – December 23, 2003
- Preceded by: Sid Snyder
- Succeeded by: Bill Finkbeiner

Minority Leader of the Washington Senate
- In office January 10, 2000 – January 13, 2003
- Preceded by: Dan McDonald
- Succeeded by: Lisa Brown

Member of the Washington Senate from the 6th district
- In office January 12, 1987 – December 23, 2003
- Preceded by: Sam C. Guess
- Succeeded by: Brian Murray

Member of the Washington House of Representatives from the 6th district
- In office January 10, 1983 – January 12, 1987
- Preceded by: Michael McGinnis
- Succeeded by: Duane Sommers

Personal details
- Born: James Elton West; March 28, 1951 Salem, Oregon, U.S.
- Died: July 22, 2006 (aged 55) Seattle, Washington, U.S.
- Party: Republican
- Spouse: Ginger Marshall (m. 1990; div. 1995)
- Education: Spokane Community College (attended); Gonzaga University (BA)

Military service
- Branch/service: United States Army
- Years of service: 1971–1974
- Unit: 82nd Airborne Division
- Battles/wars: Cold War

James Elton "Jim" West (March 28, 1951 – July 22, 2006) was an American politician from Spokane, Washington. While mayor of Spokane in 2005, he was the target of allegations of the sexual abuse of boys twenty years earlier. These allegations became public after West became a target of a sting operation conducted by his hometown newspaper, The Spokesman-Review. Some journalists and academics criticized the paper for what they saw as a form of entrapment. West admitted engaging in homosexual behavior with adults, despite an earlier record of supporting "anti-gay" legislation. Though never charged, he was removed from office by recall in 2005. The Federal Bureau of Investigation (FBI) eventually closed its investigation and took no action for lack of evidence.

== Early years ==
Born in Salem, Oregon, West was raised in Spokane and graduated from Lewis and Clark High School in 1969. He attended the University of Nevada in Reno, joined ROTC, then served in the U.S. Army as a paratrooper with the 82nd Airborne Division. Honorably discharged in late 1974, West returned to Spokane to pursue a career in law enforcement, with the Medical Lake police department and later as a deputy sheriff for Spokane County. He concurrently attended Spokane Community College and graduated from Gonzaga University with a degree in criminal justice in 1978.

== Legislative career ==
After a failed bid for sheriff in 1978, West was elected to the Spokane city council in 1980. In 1982, he was elected to the state legislature as a Republican representing the 6th legislative district in the house. West was elected to the state senate in 1986, serving until his resignation to become mayor of Spokane in 2003. In the senate, he chaired several powerful committees (health, ways and means) and was majority leader.

During his years in the legislature, West developed a record as an opponent of homosexual rights. He supported several "anti-gay" bills, including one that would have banned gays and lesbians from working in schools and day care centers. He unsuccessfully proposed a law banning all sexual activity among unmarried persons under the age of 18. In 1995, when West was a state senator, he advocated the impeachment of Gov. Mike Lowry for alleged sexual harassment.

He served as mayor of Spokane from 2003 to 2005.

== Investigation ==
In June 2003, The Spokesman-Review began a series of investigative reports into sexual abuse incidents that had occurred in Spokane during the 1970s and 1980s, but went unreported at the time. Reporter Bill Morlin worked on the story for more than a year but failed to find a link between West and the crimes committed by his friend David D. Hahn twenty years earlier.

The newspaper nevertheless targeted West in a sting operation. In 2004, Morlin received a tip about West from a source that has never been publicly identified. The source claimed that the real identity of the persona on the gay.com website named "Cobra82" was West. The Spokesman-Review then hired a professional investigator to create a false online persona on Gay.com named "Motobrock." This tactic was then used by the newspaper to arrange a meeting between the two. When West turned up for the meeting on a Spokane golf course the newspaper editor was also present and concluded that Cobra82 was the mayor.

In 2005, sex-abuse charges against West surfaced in The Spokesman-Review. Robert J. Galliher claimed that West had committed sexual abuse against him while a member of West's Boy Scout troop. These charges about events two decades old could not be confirmed by other witnesses and Galliher's long criminal record tended to discredit him. West called the molestation allegations "flat lies," but admitted to having private online relationships in the past year through the Gay.com website. It was alleged that he offered unpaid internships to young gay men, none under the age of 18, though some were just graduating from high school. West denied charges that he had sought out minors.

Calls for his resignation spread. West defended himself on the Today Show on May 30, 2005. He explained his support for laws unfavorable to gays in this way: "If someone hires you to paint their house red, then you paint it red. Even if you think it would look better green." In a Spokane City Council meeting immediately afterward, a resolution requesting that he step down passed unanimously, yet West announced he intended to continue on as mayor.

On June 2, the Spokane County Republican Party, Washington State Republican Party, and Spokane County Democratic Chairwoman Katie Kirking called for West's resignation. The FBI conducted its own investigation and a special city commission was set up to investigate and determine if any laws or policies had been broken In early August, 2005, the FBI searched West's home and seized his personal computers as part of its public corruption investigation.

Organizers of a recall gathered a sufficient number of signatures, and a special mail-in election was held on December 6, 2005, to determine whether West would remain in office. West was recalled by the voters with 65% in favor of ousting him to 35% in favor of keeping him as mayor. His term ended on December 16, 2005, the day the final votes were certified by the Spokane County Auditor's office. West's ousting was first time a Spokane sitting mayor was recalled out of office.

On February 16, 2006, the Federal Bureau of Investigation issued its report closing its investigation of West. In the FBI report, Attorney Mark Bartlett said, "We did not find facts that would justify initiating federal criminal charges."

== Personal life ==
Jim West proposed to Ginger Marshall from the Floor of the Washington State Senate. They were married for five years.

Ginger Marshall said this about Jim West: "He cared about Spokane. He cared about the people. He cared about the infrastructure, that Spokane be and continue to be a vibrant city. He always wanted more for Spokane. He served Spokane from the time he graduated from college. He started his career as a deputy sheriff and was a City Council member. Was a member of the House of Representatives and then the State Senate. He had ambitions to do good things for Spokane, and it grew into ambitions for doing good work for the state as a whole."

== Later years ==
In the final days of his life, West was mulling over another opportunity to run for office. He also told KREM 2 in his last TV interview that during his tenure in the state legislature he only regretted one vote: for a bill that would have banned gays from working in schools and day-care centers.

West was diagnosed with colon cancer in 2003. By the early fall of 2005 West's isolation from the Spokane community was nearly complete. He had only a few friends and family to turn to for support during his illness. He joined the conservative Bethel African Methodist Episcopal Church of Spokane. He received support there and attended services regularly until his death from complications from cancer on July 22, 2006.

== Election results ==
List of votes from all of West's elections.

Year	Office/Issue	Candidate	Party	City	Outside	Total
2005	Recall Election For					40,014
2005	Recall Election Against					21,518
2003	Mayor of Spokane	Jim West				26,577
2003	Mayor of Spokane	Tom Grant				23,688
2002	State Senate 6	Jim West (Incumbent)	Republican	14,364	9,657	24,021
2002	State Senate 6	Laurie Dolan	Democrat	14,838	7,878	22,716
1998	State Senate 6	Jim West (Incumbent)	Republican	15,921	5,680	21,601
1998	State Senate 6	Judy Personett	Democrat	15,691	4,260	19,951
1994	State Senate 6	Jim West (Incumbent)	Republican	23,871	7,858	31,729
1994	State Senate 6	Andy Kelly	Democrat	11,245	2,769	14,014
1990	State Senate 6	Jim West (Incumbent)	Republican	10,117	5,363	15,480
1990	State Senate 6	Jan Polek	Democrat	8,920	4,293	13,213
1986	State Senate 6	Jim West	Republican	9,584	4,780	14,364
1986	State Senate 6	Tony Anderson	Democrat	9,379	4,426	13,805
1984	Rep 6-1	Jim West (Incumbent)	Republican	14,232	7,286	21,518
1984	Rep 6-1	Joseph Lynch	Democrat	10,050	5,147	15,197
1982	Rep 6-1	Jim West	Republican	10,285	4,355	14,640
1982	Rep 6-1	Mary Springer	Democrat	8,686	4,856	13,542
1979	Council 3	Jim West				20,823
1979	Council 3	Marilyn M Stanton				15,917
1978	Sheriff	Larry V Erickson	Democrat	31,894	23,116	55,010
1978	Sheriff	Jim West	Republican	16,381	13,729	30,110
1978	Sheriff	Alfred J Teeples	Independent	5,027	4,896	9,923

Washington State Senate
Preceded by Dan McDonald	Minority Leader of the Washington Senate; 2000–2003	Succeeded by Lisa Brown
Preceded by Sid Snyder	Majority Leader of the Washington Senate; 2003	Succeeded by Bill Finkbeiner
Political offices
Preceded by John Powers	Mayor of Spokane; 2003–2005	Succeeded by Dennis P. Hession
