= John Talbott (mayor) =

Mayor of Spokane

41st Mayor of Spokane
- In office 1998–2000
- Preceded by: Jack Geraghty
- Succeeded by: John Powers

Personal details
- Born: November 25, 1933 (age 92)
- Party: Republican
- Spouse: Claudia

John Talbott is a former Mayor of Spokane, Washington, United States.

Talbott served in the United States Air Force from 1953 to 1982, first as an airborne radio and radar repairman in post-World War II Japan in a variety of capacities including planning, maintenance, and operations, including seven years of enlisted experience. After his original assignment, he returned home to Spokane where he worked at Fairchild Air Force Base and married his wife, Claudia. He later went on to a six-year career at the Pasadena Jet Propulsion Laboratory through the eighties.

Talbott was elected Mayor of Spokane in 1997, and the last mayor to serve under the council-manager form of Government. He served one term in office, ran for re-election in 2000, but retired after losing his re-election bid to lawyer John Powers. Though the position of Mayor wasn't political, Talbott is a Republican.

In December 2010 Talbott was elected State Committeeman of the Franklin County Republican Central Committee.
