= Lisa Brown (Washington politician) =

American politician (born 1956)

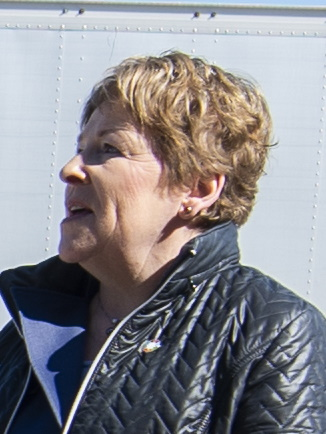
- Brown in 2020

48th Mayor of Spokane
- Incumbent
- Assumed office January 2, 2024
- Preceded by: Nadine Woodward

Director of the Washington State Department of Commerce
- In office February 11, 2019 – March 3, 2022
- Governor: Jay Inslee
- Preceded by: Brian Bonlender
- Succeeded by: Kendrick Stewart (acting)

Chancellor of Washington State University Spokane
- In office January 14, 2013 – August 31, 2017
- Preceded by: Brian Pitcher
- Succeeded by: Daryll DeWald

Majority Leader of the Washington Senate
- In office January 10, 2005 – December 10, 2012
- Preceded by: Bill Finkbeiner
- Succeeded by: Rodney Tom

Minority Leader of the Washington Senate
- In office January 13, 2003 – January 10, 2005
- Preceded by: James E. West
- Succeeded by: Bill Finkbeiner

Member of the Washington Senate from the 3rd district
- In office January 13, 1997 – January 14, 2013
- Preceded by: John A. Moyer
- Succeeded by: Andy Billig

Member of the Washington House of Representatives from the 3rd, Position 1 district
- In office January 11, 1993 – January 13, 1997
- Preceded by: William Day
- Succeeded by: Alex Wood

Personal details
- Born: October 9, 1956 (age 69) Robinson, Illinois, U.S.
- Party: Democratic
- Spouse: Brian McClatchey (m. 2017)
- Children: 1
- Education: University of Illinois, Urbana-Champaign (BA); University of Colorado, Boulder (MA, PhD)
- Website: Campaign website

Lisa Jo Brown (born October 9, 1956) is an American politician and educator who is the current mayor of Spokane, Washington. She previously served as the director of the Washington State Department of Commerce. A member of the Democratic Party, Brown has served in both houses of the Washington State Legislature, including eight years as the first Democratic female majority leader of the Washington State Senate. She has also served as the chancellor of Washington State University Spokane, a position she stepped down from in order to mount an unsuccessful campaign for the U.S. House.

Born and raised in Illinois, she received her undergraduate education from the University of Illinois Urbana-Champaign and a Ph.D. in economics from the University of Colorado Boulder. Brown spent over three decades in higher education teaching economics at Eastern Washington University and in the organizational leadership program at Gonzaga University. She was appointed the first female Chancellor of Washington State University Spokane in 2013 and served in that role until 2017.

Brown first entered politics in 1992 when she was elected to the Washington State House of Representatives. She was elected to the state senate in 1996 and elected as the first female Democratic Majority Leader of that body in 2005. She returned to politics in 2018, running to represent Washington's 5th congressional district against Republican incumbent Cathy McMorris Rodgers. Brown was considered a dark horse candidate and the race received national attention, though Brown lost. In 2019, Governor Jay Inslee appointed her director of the Washington State Department of Commerce. She declined a run for Mayor of Spokane in 2019. In 2023, Brown resigned from the Washington State Department of Commerce to launch a campaign for Mayor of Spokane in that year's election, which she won against the incumbent, Nadine Woodward.

== Early life and education ==
Lisa Jo Brown was born October 9, 1956, in Robinson, Illinois. She graduated from the University of Illinois with a bachelor's degree in economics. She earned a master's degree and a Ph.D. in economics from the University of Colorado, Boulder.

== Career ==
Outside of politics, Brown worked in higher education and public leadership positions as a professor, a university administrator and she is currently the director of the Washington State Department of Commerce. Brown began working as an associate professor of economics at Eastern Washington University in 1981, a position she would hold until 2001. She served briefly as the interim director of the university's Women's Center in 1983.

While on sabbatical from Eastern Washington University in 1990, Lisa traveled to Nicaragua where she participated as an election observer at a Nicaraguan election and studied and taught an economics class at Central American University in Managua. When the conservative National Opposition Union won power in 1990, Brown expressed worry that the new leaders would walk back the partially state-run command economy, replacing it with a more conservative, market-based economy.

Brown also worked as a professor in organizational leadership at Gonzaga University from 2001 until 2012. She became the Chancellor of Washington State University Spokane in 2013 after leaving the state senate. As chancellor, Brown oversaw the creation of the Elson S. Floyd College of Medicine, the first medical school in the Washington State University system and the second public medical school in the state. The school opened in 2015 and its inaugural class was seated in the fall of 2017.

In 2016, Brown accompanied former Lieutenant Governor of Washington Brad Owen to Cuba on a fact-finding trip concerning healthcare. Upon return, Brown praised aspects of the community-based Cuban healthcare system in an interview. In the same interview, Brown stated that aspects of the Cuban model should be used in the United States.

Washington Governor Jay Inslee appointed Brown as director of the Department of Commerce on January 29, 2019. Her term began on February 11. On February 13, 2023, Brown announced she would step down as director on March 3 of the same year. Following her resignation, she announced her campaign for Mayor of Spokane, challenging incumbent Nadine Woodward in the 2023 election. Brown won the election.

== Washington State Legislature ==
=== House of Representatives ===
Brown was first elected to the state legislature in 1992. She received 46.51% of the vote out in a field of five candidates (which included four fellow Democrats) during the September primary election. In the November general election, she defeated Republican Chuck Potter by receiving 64.48% of the vote to Potter's 35.52%. She was reelected in 1994, receiving 64.55% to Republican John G. Titchenal's 35.45%. Brown was named minority floor leader at the start of her second term.

==== Committee assignments ====
First term:

- Committee on Transportation, Vice-Chair
- Committee on Revenue
- Committee on Human Services

Second term:

- Committee on Transportation
- Committee on Children and Family Services
- Rules Committee

=== State senate ===
Brown announced she would challenge one-term incumbent John A. Moyer in the 1996 election on April 22, 1996. In her announcement, she named education and welfare as her two major priorities for the campaign and her tenure. Due to Moyer's perceived vulnerability and the potential for the seat to swing the balance of power in the state senate, the race was expected to be one of the most competitive and expensive in the state. Brown went on to win the election, receiving 57.65% of the vote in the September primary and 55.3% of the vote in the general election. Brown was unopposed in 2000. She won over 60% of the vote in 2004 and almost 75% of the vote in 2008.

== Political positions ==
=== Tax policy ===
At a candidates' debate in Spokane in 1996, State Senator John A. Moyer, whom Brown was challenging, questioned why Brown voted in 1993 for what he called the biggest tax increase in state history. Brown replied that Moyer mischaracterized the vote, and said she supported the tax increase to balance the budget.

In 1995, when the state had a budget surplus, Brown criticized Republicans for not offering tax breaks to middle-class families. Brown supported using the surplus to lower the state sales tax and property taxes for low- and middle-income families. She opposed a Republican-supported measure to raise the gas tax.

In 2005, Brown voted against a $258 million property tax cut. Washington law, passed by voter initiative I-960, requires that a two-thirds majority be reached in the legislature on bills which raise taxes. As State Senate Majority Leader, Brown initiated a lawsuit in 2009 challenging the measure, which the state supreme court rejected unanimously. Later, in 2010, Brown voted yes on S.B. 6843 and S.B. 6130 to suspend the two-thirds threshold required by state law to raise taxes. In 2005, Brown had advocated for the legislature to be given the authority to raise taxes without having to meet the two-thirds threshold.

=== Welfare policy ===
Brown's time in the House coincided with a national movement for welfare reform, a large part of President Bill Clinton's agenda. Brown was opposed to welfare reform that involved making any cuts to the program, specifically those which cut programs for parents and children. She opposed a welfare bill that would end benefits for teenage parents and put a two-year cap on benefits for everyone. Approximately 40% of the citizens in Spokane relied on public assistance programs during Brown's tenure.

=== Health care policy ===
Brown, during her 2018 campaign for the House of Representatives, proposed the U.S. federal government provide a public option for health insurance, the lowering of the age of eligibility for Medicare, and the expansion of Medicaid. She has explicitly declined to endorse a full overhaul of the U.S. health care system stating "I don't think it’s realistic to expect that we’re going to create an entire public system, and then tell everyone they have to give up their current system to go into it."

== 2018 U.S. House candidacy ==
After months of speculation, Brown announced her candidacy for United States House of Representatives on August 31, 2017. She challenged Republican incumbent Cathy McMorris Rodgers in Washington's 5th congressional district, which has not had a Democratic representative since former House Speaker Tom Foley lost reelection to George Nethercutt in 1994 during the Republican Revolution.

During a December 20, 2017, town hall, Brown opposed the Tax Cuts and Jobs Act of 2017, Republican-supported legislation which had been passed earlier that month, which lowered personal and corporate tax rates, and repealed the individual mandate of the Affordable Care Act. McMorris Rodgers, as the Chair of the Republican House Caucus, was one of the major proponents of the legislation. Brown criticized the bill, saying it was unfairly beneficial to wealthier Americans, increased the deficit, and forced tax cuts to programs such as health care and agriculture.

In the August blanket primary, Brown received 45.36% of the vote to 49.29 percent for McMorris Rodgers. As of early August 2018, Brown had raised about $2.4 million and McMorris Rodgers had raised about $3.8 million for their campaigns.

In the November general election, Brown was defeated by McMorris Rodges, garnering 45.26% of the vote to McMorris Rodgers' 54.74%. This was the best showing for a Democrat in the district in over two decades.

Though she had been mentioned as a potential candidate for Mayor of Spokane in 2019, she denied she had any intention of running.

== Mayor of Spokane ==
Brown is the current mayor of the City of Spokane. She received 51.7% of the vote versus incumbent Nadine Woodward. Woodward conceded and Brown was sworn into office on January 1, 2024.

== Personal life ==
Brown married Spokane City Council policy adviser Brian McClatchey on October 9, 2017. The two had met in 2010 while campaigning for Spokane Mayor Mary Verner's re-election campaign. Brown has one child from a previous relationship.

Washington State Senate
| Preceded by Bill Finkbeiner | Majority Leader of the Washington Senate; 2005–2012 | Succeeded by Rodney Tom |
