= Nadine Woodward =

American politician (born 1962)

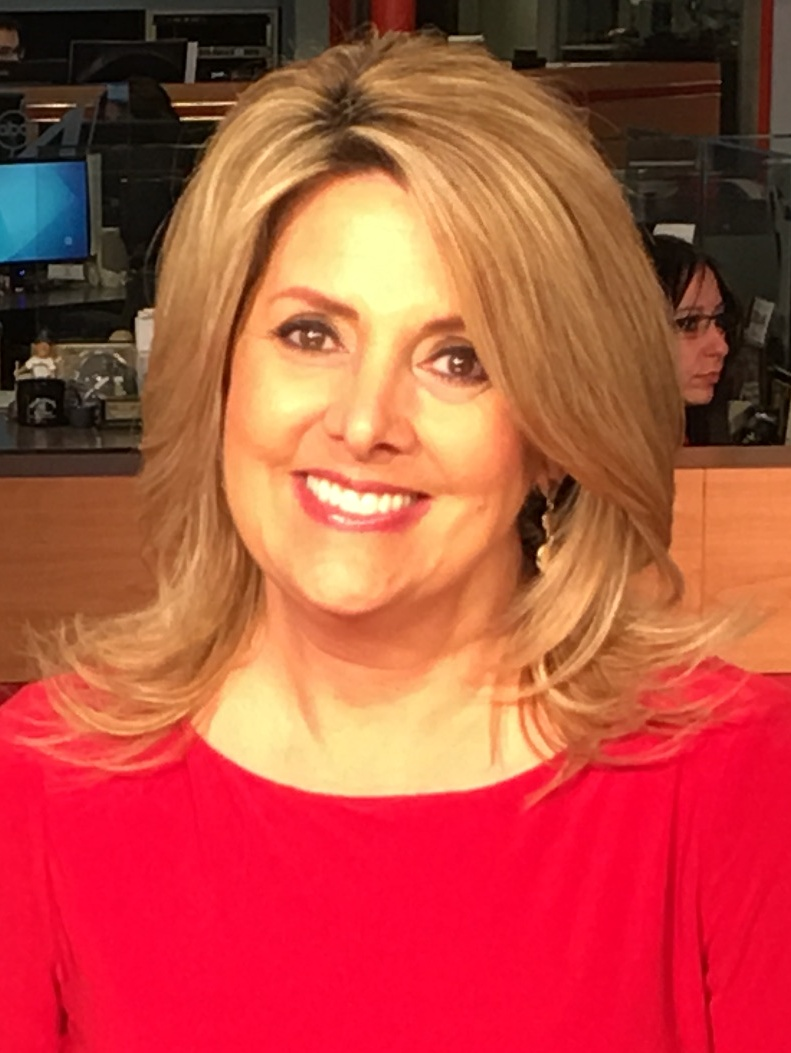
- Woodward anchoring KXLY-TV news

47th Mayor of Spokane
- In office December 30, 2019 – December 31, 2023
- Preceded by: David Condon
- Succeeded by: Lisa Brown

Personal details
- Born: January 27, 1962 (age 64) Vancouver, Washington, U.S.
- Party: Republican
- Education: University of Portland (Bachelor's degree)

Nadine Woodward (born January 27, 1962) is an American politician who served as the mayor of Spokane, Washington from December 30, 2019 to January 1, 2024. She succeeded David Condon in December 2019. Prior to her election, Woodward worked as a news anchor. Woodward lost her bid for reelection in 2023 and was succeeded by former Washington State Department of Commerce Director Lisa Brown.

== Early life and education ==
Raised in Vancouver, Washington, Woodward graduated from Hudson's Bay High School in 1980 before attending the University of Portland, graduating in 1985 with a Bachelor's degree in Communications Management.

== Career ==
After working at television stations in Idaho, Woodward moved to Spokane, Washington in 1990, where she worked for KREM and KXLY-TV.

Woodward's campaign for mayor was initially managed by Eleanor Baumgartner, wife of Republican politician Michael Baumgartner, and supported by incumbent mayor David Condon. Despite being nonpartisan, Woodward was supported by a number of Republican-leaning groups, and she stated her opposition to Hillary Clinton in the 2016 United States presidential election.

On August 20, 2023, during her reelection campaign and after the primary election for the 2023 Spokane mayoral election, Woodward appeared on stage alongside Sean Feucht and former state representative Matt Shea at a Christian nationalist prayer event hosted at The Podium in downtown Spokane, which was part of Feucht's national tour of the United States. Woodward prayed alongside Feucht and Shea, and was prayed for while on stage by Feucht and Shea, which led to nationwide coverage as Feucht is a self-described Christian nationalist who has been criticized for anti-LGBT rhetoric and Shea is controversial far-right figure who was expelled from the state Republican Party after an independent investigation found him to have been engaged in domestic terrorism. Woodward subsequently claimed she was unaware of who Feucht was prior to the event, and that she did not know Shea would be involved in the event. The fallout from Woodward's appearance at the event led to calls for her resignation and a push for censure from members of the Spokane City Council. On September 8, Woodward gave an interview to KHQ-TV in which she stated her intention to "get ahead of [the controversy]" in which she denied knowing Shea would be part of the event and stated she did not previously know who Feucht was. Woodward stated she attended the event to pray for those affected by wildfires like the Oregon Road and Gray Fire which had been burning around Spokane County at the time.

During her time as mayor, Woodward was an advocate for increased housing supply in Spokane. In 2021, she stated that Spokane was in a housing emergency. In 2022, she supported to relax zoning regulations in Spokane on an interim basis, permitting duplexes, triplexes, quadplexes and townhomes in all residential zones of Spokane. In 2023, she supported legislation to permanently allow up to six units per lot in residential areas, as well as allow nonresidential businesses (such as grocery stores) and facilities (such as schools and churches) in residential areas.

Woodward lost her bid for re-election in the 2023 Spokane mayoral election and officially conceded on November 13, 2023.

On July 19, 2024, Woodward filed a lawsuit against the city of Spokane seeking upwards of $1.4 million in damages, claiming that the Spokane City Council interfered in the 2023 mayoral election and violated her right to free speech by passing a resolution condemning her for her appearance on stage with Feucht and Shea.

Political offices
Preceded by David Condon	Mayor of Spokane, Washington; 2019–2023	Succeeded by Lisa Brown
