= Jack Geraghty =

American civic politician

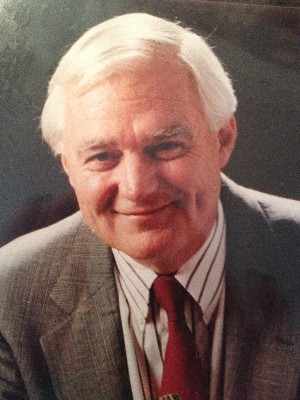

40th Mayor of Spokane
- In office December 30, 1994 – December 30, 1998
- Preceded by: Sheri S. Barnard
- Succeeded by: John Talbott

Personal details
- Born: John Vincent Geraghty, Jr. February 23, 1934 Seattle, Washington, U.S.
- Died: December 7, 2023 (aged 89) Spokane, Washington, U.S.
- Party: Democratic
- Spouse(s): Marlene Curtis (1958–1997); Kerry Lynch (2001–2023)
- Relations: James M. Geraghty (grandfather)
- Children: 4
- Education: BA in Journalism from the University of Washington
- Occupation: Jack Geraghty & Associates (founder); Alliance Pacific Inc. (VP)
- Profession: Public relations consultant

Military service
- Branch/service: United States Army; Air Force Reserve; Air National Guard
- Years of service: 1956–1966
- Rank: Lieutenant

John Vincent Geraghty Jr. (February 23, 1934 – December 7, 2023) was an American civic politician, journalist, and public relations consultant from Spokane, Washington. In 1964, he was elected to the Spokane County Board of Commissioners, while simultaneously serving in the Air National Guard and working as a staff journalist with the Spokane Daily Chronicle. He resigned as county commissioner in 1971, when the City of Spokane began preparing to host the 1974 World's Fair. While he was initially named as the director of public relations, he was later appointed to serve as the vice president of exhibitor and guest relations. At that time, he established the public relations consulting firm of Jack Geraghty and Associates. In 1975, he founded the short-lived weekly newspaper, known as The Falls. In 1992, he was elected as the 40th mayor of the city, serving from 1993 to 1998. In 2011, he was honored as a member of the University of Washington Department of Communication's Alumni Hall of Fame.

== Personal background ==
=== Early life and family ===
John Vincent Geraghty Jr. was born on February 23, 1934, in Seattle, Washington and raised in Spokane. He is the son of John Vincent and Gladys Ida (née Johnson) Geraghty, Sr. His father worked in advertising as art director and account executive on staff with Spokane-area agencies for over 45 years. He was also a commercial water color artist and a member of the Spokane Water Color Society. Geraghty's siblings include brothers Michael and Thomas, and sisters Kathleen Whitbeck and Mary Sturm.

Geraghty was a third-generation Irish American. His great grandparents immigrated to the US from County Mayo, Ireland in 1880, when his grandfather, James M. Geraghty, was ten years old. His grandfather served as Spokane's City Attorney and member of the Washington State House of Representatives from the 3rd legislative district. Ironically, while Geraghty's grandfather served as Spokane's City Attorney during the first decade of the 20th century, Geraghty served as the mayor of the city during the last decade. In 1933, his grandfather was appointed to the Washington State Supreme Court, by Governor Clarence D. Martin.

=== Education ===
Geraghty attended North Central High School, graduating in 1952. His extracurricular activities included participating in writing, editing, and producing the North Central News student newspaper. In 1997, he was honored as an inaugural recipient of the North Central High School Distinguished Alumnus Award. Fellow recipients included former member of the National Transportation Safety Board and NASA's Safety Advisory Group for Space Flight, Vernon L. Grose; US Congressman, George Nethercutt; Jerry Sage, WWII prisoner of war portrayed by Steve McQueen in the movie, The Great Escape; and musician Don Eagle, who toured with the USO during WWII and appeared in A Connecticut Yankee in King Arthur's Court (with fellow-Spokanite Bing Crosby), Night Has a Thousand Eyes (with Edward G. Robinson), and The Strip (with Mickey Rooney).

After high school, Geraghty enrolled at the University of Washington, where he was a member of the Beta Theta Pi fraternity. He graduated in 1956 with a bachelor's degree in journalism. While attending the University of Washington, he served as president of the school's student body and worked on the staff of The Daily of the University of Washington student newspaper. He is a lifetime member of the University of Washington's Alumni Association. In 2011, the Department of Communication honored him with a membership to the Alumni Hall of Fame.

=== Military ===
Immediately following his graduation from college, Geraghty was drafted into the US Army and sent to boot camp at Fort Ord in California. He was then sent to Washington D.C., where he utilized his journalism degree by editing the Service Stripe military newspaper at Walter Reed Army Medical Center. After two years in the Army, Geraghty returned to Spokane, serving another two years in the Air Force Reserves. He was a Lieutenant, assigned to a post as the Public Information Officer in the Air National Guard.

=== Marriage ===
On April 19, 1958, Geraghty married Marlene Curtis at St Paschal's Catholic Church in Spokane. Together, they had four daughters, Marcella Maile, Sheila Geraghty, Brigid Krause, and Nora Boyle; and seven grandchildren. Two of his grandsons are graduates of the University of Washington, while another graduated from the Air Force Academy. While daughter Sheila is the business administrator for the Salvation Army in Spokane, Brigid serves as the volunteer services manager for Catholic Charities. Geraghty and his wife were separated in 1994 and divorced in 1997.

In 2001, Geraghty and Kerry Lynch were married by Father Gerard O'Leary at St Joseph's Church, located in the countryside outside Limerick, Ireland. Geraghty and his wife share a common Irish heritage. They have visited Ireland more than a dozen times and Limerick city every two years. They have worked together in establishing and strengthening Spokane's Sister City relationship with Limerick. They co-founded the Spokane Limerick Sister City Society and established the Friendly Sons of St Patrick together. As of 2013, Lynch continues to serve as the president of the Spokane-Limerick Sister City Society. She is also the founder and president of the public relations consulting firm of Alliance Pacific, Inc. and former communications director for Spokane Public Schools. He is the stepfather of her daughters, Kaitlin Larson (BA: Gonzaga University, Masters of Communications and Organizational Leadership: Gonzaga University) and Meghan Johnson (BA: Oregon State University, MBA: Gonzaga University). He had three grandchildren through Kaitlin and her husband, Wes Larson. Geraghty and his wife resided in southwest Spokane. He died there on December 7, 2023, at the age of 89.

== Professional background ==
=== Journalism ===
Following completion of his service with the Air National Guard, Geraghty was hired as a reporter for the Spokane Daily Chronicle newspaper, which later merged with The Spokesman-Review. During his work on staff at the Chronicle, he reported on news, events, activities, and the judicial process at the Spokane County Courthouse. In 1975, following the success of Expo '74, Geraghty established and began publishing a weekly newspaper known as The Falls, referring to the Spokane River, which prominently passes through Riverfront Park and the central business district, flowing over the Spokane Falls, just under the Monroe Street Bridge. After two years, the newspaper shut down, when it was proven to be unsuccessful. Geraghty said of the venture, "That was really a tough go because we were fighting the [daily newspaper in Spokane]. We were trying to emulate David Brewster and the Seattle weekly he had. We didn't really have the base population to make it work. That's probably one of my biggest disappointments."

=== County politics ===
In 1964, Geraghty was elected to the Spokane County Board of Commissioners. Just 29 years old, he was the youngest county commissioner ever elected. During his time in office, he focused on restructuring county departments. Following the 1953 demolition of the Public Health Building, which was adjacent to the Spokane County Courthouse, the County built a modernized four-story annex to house various departments. During this time, Geraghty successfully championed the consolidation of the County Sheriff's department with the city's police and corrections functions in the new Public Health Building.

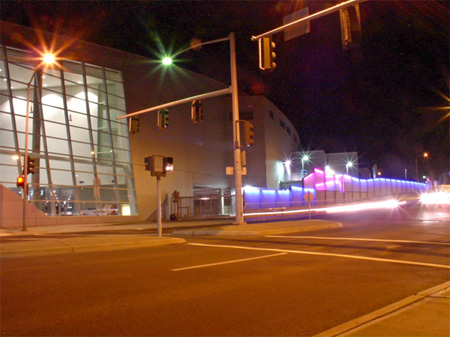
Group Health Exhibit Hall at night

=== Public relations ===
In 1971, Geraghty resigned his membership on the Spokane County Board of Commissioners, when he established the corporate firm of Jack Geraghty and Associates, which provides consulting services focusing on public relations, community studies, and public affairs. In preparation for Spokane's hosting of the 1974 World's Fair, Geraghty was named as the director of Public Relations of the organizing committee. He was later appointed to serve as the vice president of Exhibitor and Guest Relations. In preparation for the fair, the local government demolished the downtown business district, which was previously dominated by the Great Northern Railroad Depot. In addition to serving as the founder of Jack Geraghty and Associates, Geraghty has served as Vice President and senior advisor of Alliance Pacific, Inc., which was founded by his wife, Kerry Lynch. In his role with both firms, he spearheaded several bond issues, which have resulted in the development of public libraries; renovation and construction of local high schools; and improving city parks and street projects. He was also instrumental in expanding the Spokane Convention Center, Group Health Exhibit Hall, and the Agricultural Trade Center, which had been the Washington State Pavilion during the World's Fair.

=== City politics ===
On November 4, 1993, Geraghty was elected to serve as the 39th mayor for the City of Spokane. During his term in office, he focused his efforts on public safety, economic development, streamlining city government, and improving the infrastructure of the city streets, transportation system, and traffic corridors. He also began working on reviving the local economy, by revitalizing the city's central business district with the development of River Park Square and restoration of the historic Davenport Hotel. He also hired 30 additional police officers and established nine neighborhood centers throughout the city, which have served reduce crime and empower citizens to improve and strengthen the voice of neighborhoods in city decision-making. In 1997, he ran for a second term in office to commence in 1998, but was defeated for re-election by John Talbott.

== Community involvement ==
Geraghty was involved in public and private organizations throughout the Spokane since 1964. As a prominent civic leader, he has worked with the Sister Cities Society and the City of Spokane to establish and maintain international relationships with the cities of Nishinomiya, Japan and Limerick. In honor of his Irish heritage, Geraghty and his wife co-founded the Spokane Limerick Sister City Society and established the Friendly Sons of St. Patrick. In 1996, Geraghty's wife, Kerry, was named as the Irish Woman of the Year. In 1997, Geraghty served as Grand Marshal of Spokane's St. Patrick's Day parade, established by the Friendly Sons of St. Patrick. In 1999, he served as the parade chairman. He was named as president of the Friendly Sons of St. Patrick in 2000 and 2001. In 2013, he was named Irish Man of the Year, while his daughter, Sheila, was named as the Irish Woman of the Year.

Geraghty was the founder of the Citizen's League of Greater Spokane that championed the election of Freeholders and established a charter to unify city and county government in Spokane. He served as President and Vice President of Programs of the Public Relations Society of America. He also served as the president of the Manito Golf and Country Club, Spokane Press Club, and Spokane Public Relations Council. He was chairman of the board of trustees at Eastern Washington University, just west of Spokane.

== Board and committee memberships ==
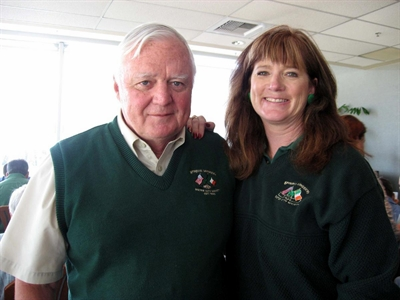
Jack Geraghty and his wife, Kerry Lynch, at Irish Day at the Races at Emerald Downs in Auburn, Washington, 2007

- Citizen's League of Greater Spokane Founder
- Community Action Council Steering Committee Member
- Eastern Washington University Member of the board of trustees
- Eastern Washington University Chairman of the board of trustees (twice)
- Expo '74 World's Fair Vice President of Exhibitor and Guest Relations
- Friendly Sons of St. Patrick President (2000–2001)
- FutureSpokane Board President
- Manito Golf and Country Club President
- Public Relations Society of America Vice President of Programs
- Public Relations Society of America President
- Spokane Press Club President
- Spokane Public Relations Council President
- Spokane Community Mental Health Center Board of Trustees
- Spokane–Limerick Sister City Society Founding Member

== Honors and awards ==
- 1997: North Central High School Distinguished Alumnus Award
- 1997: Grand Marshal of Spokane's St. Patrick's Day parade
- 1999: Parade Chairman of Spokane's St Patrick's Day parade
- 2011: University of Washington Department of Communication Alumni Hall of Fame
- 2013: Irish Man of the Year of the Friendly Sons of St Patrick

Preceded by Sheri S. Barnard	Mayor of Spokane, Washington	Succeeded by John Talbott
