= David H. Rodgers =

American politician

35th Mayor of Spokane
- In office 1967–1978
- Preceded by: Neal Randolph Fosseen
- Succeeded by: Ron Bair

Personal details
- Born: August 10, 1923 New Albany, Indiana, U.S.
- Died: April 18, 2017 (aged 93) Spokane, Washington, U.S.
- Party: Republican
- Spouses: Dorothy Rodgers (died 1964) Naomi Fowle Rodgers (m. 1965; died 2016)
- Children: 6
- Occupation: Insurance agent

David H. Rodgers (August 10, 1923 – April 18, 2017) was an American politician and Mayor of Spokane, Washington, from 1967 until 1978.

Rogers was born in New Albany, Indiana, and attended Purdue University. After serving in World War II as a Navy UDT communications officer, he came to Spokane in 1949. Among many political and community activities, Rodgers was a member of the local YMCA and Boy Scouts boards, along with city and county Republican committees.

Rodgers was appointed to Spokane City Council in 1966 to fill an unexpired term of council Luke Williams. After incumbent mayor Neal Fosseen announced his resignation in 1967, Rodgers declared his candidacy for the position in July of that year. He was elected on November 7, 1967, defeating Ralph Rosenberry, another prominent Spokane citizen, in an election that was described by a local newspaper as having an "unexpected low vote". He was re-elected to another term in 1973 and served as mayor until retiring in 1978. After retiring, Rodgers, who had formerly worked in the insurance business, served as Washington's Deputy State Insurance Commissioner. One of Rodgers' sons, Brian Rodgers, is married to Cathy McMorris Rodgers, who has served as the United States representative for Washington's 5th congressional district since 2005.

Rodgers died on April 18, 2017, at age 93. He was preceded in death by his wife, Naomi Fowle Rodgers, whom he was married to from 1965 until her death in 2016.
