= Mary Verner =

American politician

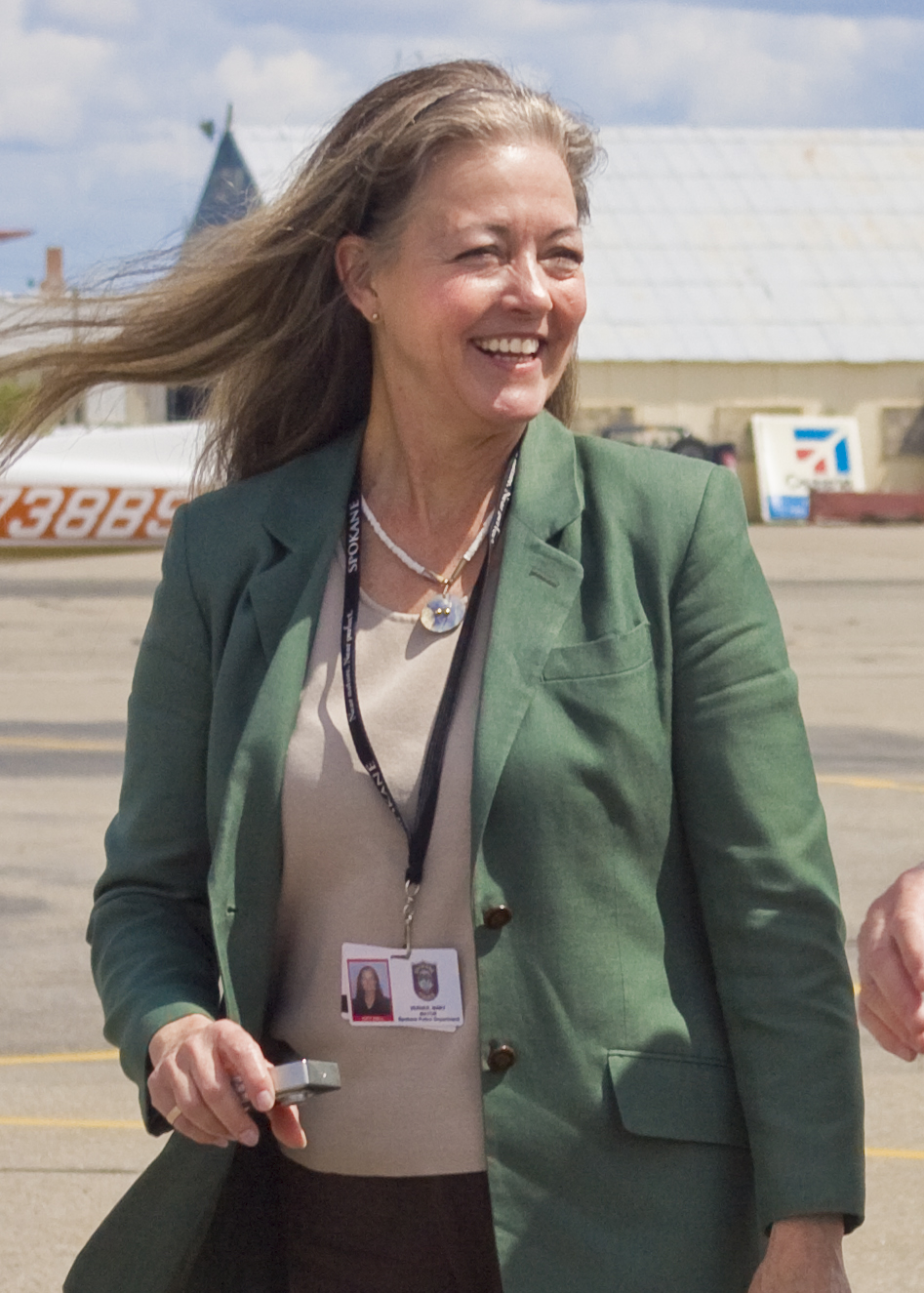

45th Mayor of Spokane
- In office December 30, 2007 – December 30, 2011
- Preceded by: Dennis P. Hession
- Succeeded by: David Condon

Personal details
- Born: August 13, 1956 (age 68); Fitzgerald, Georgia, U.S.
- Political party: Democratic
- Education: Davidson College (BA); Yale University (MA); Gonzaga University (JD)

Mary B. Verner (born August 13, 1956) is an American politician who served as the 45th Mayor of Spokane, Washington from 2007 to 2011.

== Early life and education ==
Originally from Fitzgerald, Georgia, Verner received a Bachelor of Arts degree in Anthropology from Davidson College, earned her Master of Arts degree in environmental management from Yale University, and a Juris Doctor degree from Gonzaga University School of Law.

== Career ==
She has served as Executive Director of the Upper Columbia United Tribes. She was the third woman to become mayor of Spokane and the first woman since a mayor–council government program was instituted in the place of a previous council–manager government system.

A Democrat, Verner served on the City Council for four years before becoming mayor. Originally appointed to the council, Verner was subsequently elected to the position from which she ran for Mayor against an incumbent, Dennis Hession in 2007. Verner won with 53% of the vote, becoming Spokane's 43rd mayor on November 27, 2007.

Verner was defeated for reelection in the 2011 Spokane mayoral election.

Political offices
Preceded by Dennis P. Hession	Mayor of Spokane, Washington; 2007–2011	Succeeded by David Condon
