= David Condon =

American politician

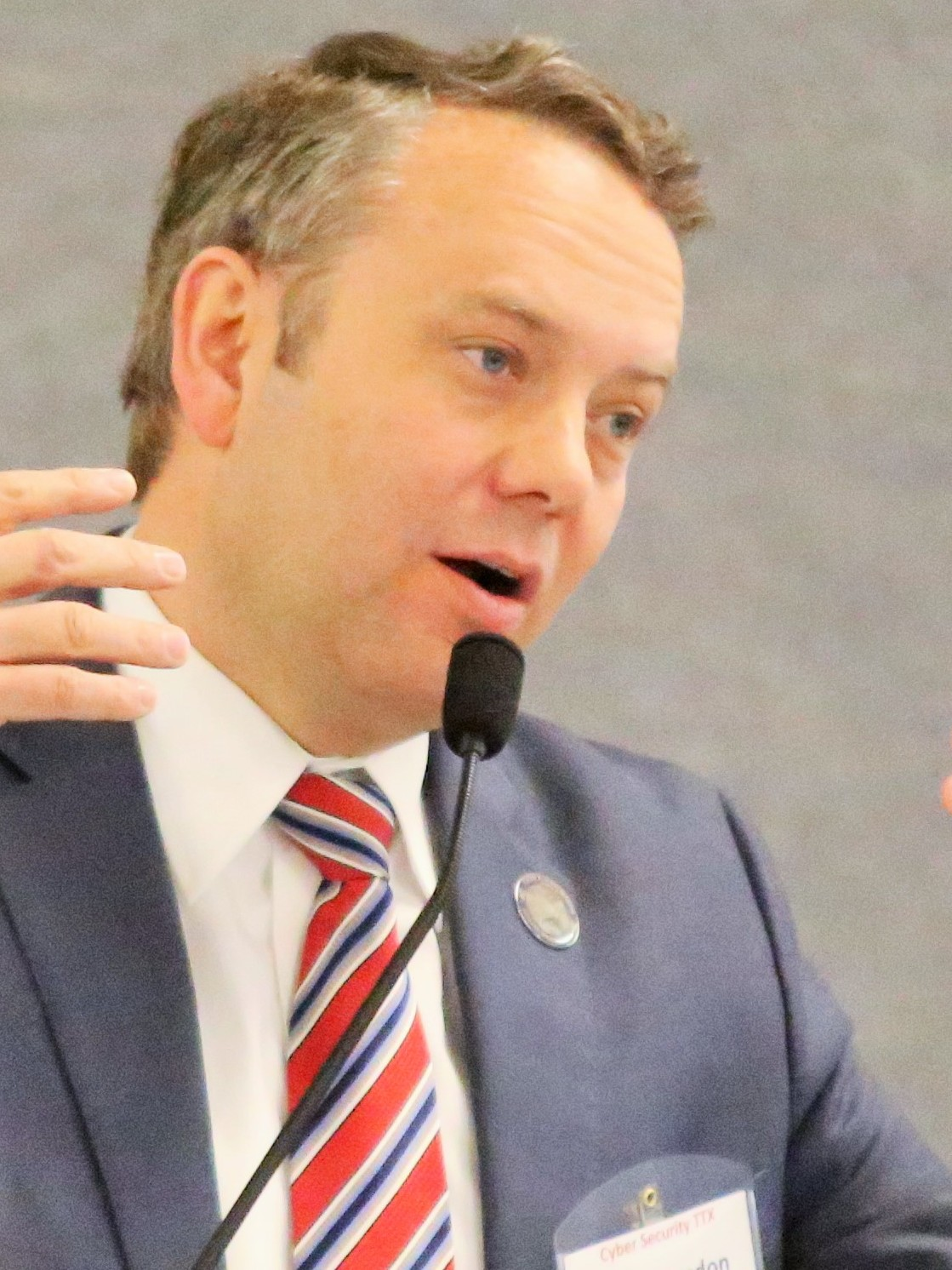

46th Mayor of Spokane
- In office December 30, 2011 – December 30, 2019
- Preceded by: Mary Verner
- Succeeded by: Nadine Woodward

Personal details
- Born: February 9, 1974 (age 52) Spokane, Washington, U.S.
- Party: Republican
- Spouse: Kristin Condon
- Children: 3
- Education: Gonzaga Preparatory School; Boston College (BA)

Military service
- Allegiance: United States
- Branch/service: United States Army
- Years of service: 1996–2005
- Rank: Captain

David A. Condon (born February 9, 1974) is an American politician who served as the mayor of Spokane, Washington from 2011 to 2019. Prior to his election as mayor, Condon was the deputy chief of staff for U.S. Congresswoman Cathy McMorris Rodgers.

A Spokane native, Condon graduated from Gonzaga Preparatory School in 1992 and then enrolled at Boston College, where he received a B.A. degree in Finance and Military Science. He immediately entered the U.S. Army where he rose to the rank of captain. He retired from military service in 2005, briefly working in small business before being hired by McMorris Rodgers. He rose to become her deputy chief of staff.

In May 2011, Condon announced he would challenge incumbent Spokane mayor Mary Verner in that year's mayoral election. Though he claimed to have a positive working relationship with Verner, he disagreed with her policies regarding taxation, vehicle registration and criminal justice. Condon went on to defeat Verner in a close race.

As mayor, Condon focused on reforming the Spokane Police Department, improving the city's financial situation and building up the city's infrastructure and parks. He was reelected in 2015, becoming the first Spokane mayor to be elected to a second term since 1973. However, he was term-limited and thus ineligible to run for reelection in 2019. Nadine Woodward won the election to succeed him and took office at the end of that year.

== Mayoral tenure ==
Crime and use-of force incidents were reported to have declined during Condon's tenure as mayor of Spokane. Use of force by the Spokane Police Department was down by 22% while violent crime was down by 19.72% and overall crime down by 8.36% as of early 2015.

Despite campaigning against utility rate and property tax increases, Condon proposed 2.9% utility rate increases to be used for capital projects to reduce the amount of raw sewage flowing into the Spokane River due to major storm events. He also proposed a 2% property tax increase to purchase police and fire equipment. He also pledged to tie all future utility rate increases to inflation. The Condon Administration's Integrated Clean Water Plan was one of the first integrated plans to be developed under the Environmental Protection Agency's integrated plan framework. Costs for the plan were estimated up to $310 million. In late 2014, the city issued $200 million in "green" bonds to pay for part of the Integrated Clean Water Plan. It was the largest amount of debt assumed in the city's history.

In December 2013 Hoyt Larison, a businessman who had contributed to Condon's reelection campaign and political action committee, was nominated by Condon to serve on the Spokane International Airport Board. Mayor Condon withdrew Larison's name from consideration after members of the City Council and The Spokesman-Review began inquiring into the timing of Larison's donations to his campaign.

In 2014, Condon announced that the City of Spokane would join the nationwide Ban the box movement by removing questions relating to criminal history on city applications. In August that year, Condon announced San Luis Potosi, San Luis Potosi, Mexico, as Spokane's newest sister city.

The following month, officials from the Washington State Auditor's office released a report showing the City of Spokane had multiple rules violations in the handling of Federal grants. This was the third year in a row that the City of Spokane showed an increase in audit findings.

Mayor Condon's proposed 2015 budget included a $7,000 raise for himself, bringing his salary to nearly $180,000. Condon later announced that he would be donating his salary increase to local charities. In 2015 the City of Spokane's Salary Review Commission voted unanimously to decrease the Mayor's salary to $163,000 effective from the following year.

=== Spokane Home Builders Association ===
In 2014, Condon vetoed an ordinance sponsored by Jon Snyder that would have prohibited the City from supplying water and sewer services to areas challenged under the Washington State Growth Management Act. The Spokane Home Builders Association, a major contributor to Condon's campaign, lobbied hard for the veto.

=== Spokane Fire Department ===
In 2013, when conservatives held the Council majority, Condon created a new organizational structure for the Spokane Fire Department which increased the number of political appointees to 14. The Spokane Firefighters Labor Union Local 29 filed a lawsuit against the city. In the November 2013 elections, the Spokane City Council majority shifted and passed a repeal of the previous ordinance expanding the political appointments. Superior Court Judge Kathleen O'Connor sided with Spokane Firefighter Labor Union Local 29, calling the city's justification for the expansion "ludicrous". Condon announced in May 2014 that he had chosen to appeal this Superior Court ruling. The case was eventually dismissed.

Political offices
Preceded by Mary Verner	Mayor of Spokane, Washington; 2011–2019	Succeeded by Nadine Woodward
